= Cateran Trail =

Walking route in central Scotland

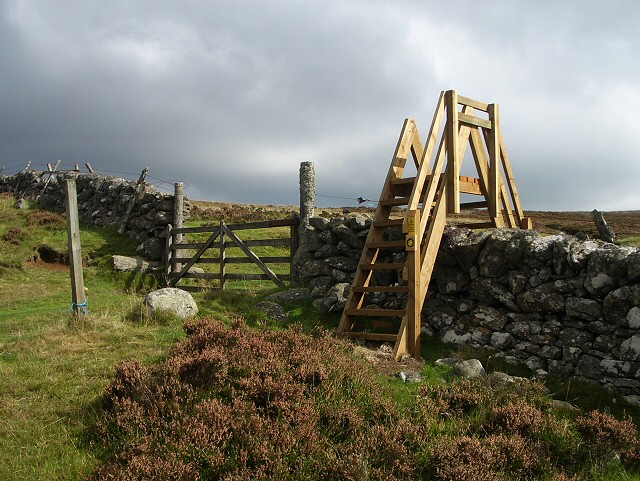
- Stile on Cateran Trail
- Length: 103 km (64 mi)
- Location: Perth & Kinross and Angus, Scotland
- Designation: Scotland's Great Trails
- Trailheads: Circular, usually Blairgowrie; 56.5919°N 3.3361°W
- Use: Hiking
- Elevation gain/loss: 2,470 metres (8,100 ft) gain
- Highest point: 653 metres (2,144 ft)
- Lowest point: 59 metres (195 ft)
- Difficulty: Moderate
- Season: All year
- Hazards: Weather
- Website: https://www.pkct.org/cateran-trail

The Cateran Trail is a 103-kilometre (64 mi) circular long-distance walking route in central Scotland. The trail has no official beginning or end and can be joined at any stage. The route was established, way-marked and is now maintained by, the Perth & Kinross Countryside Trust. A variety of terrain is covered by the trail including farmland, mountains and forest. The path itself follows old drovers' roads, minor paved roads and farm tracks and can be walked in 4 or 5 days. It is now designated as one of Scotland's Great Trails by NatureScot. As of 2018 it was estimated that around 8,000 people were using the trail each year.

== Route ==
The Cateran Trail is typically walked in 5 stages, with the stopping points being determined by the availability of accommodation and the walker's fitness. Generally, the trail is started at Blairgowrie and the clockwise direction is taken towards Kirkmichael, Spittal of Glenshee, Kirkton of Glenisla then Alyth. Throughout the walk, the path is well marked. Some waymark posts feature the gnarled faces of drovers (or alternatively caterans, cattle raiders for whom the Trail is named) carved into the edge of the post while most display the Cateran trail logo; a green ring enclosing a red heart on a white background. Due to the large number of stiles, the trail is mostly unsuitable for cyclists, and dogs must be kept on a short lead or under control where the path crosses fields with young livestock.

The Cateran Trail has been linked with the hobby of geocaching: each of the "drover's face" posts is numbered, and further information about each one can be obtained by entering the number into the www.geocaching.com website. Additionally, a "passport" is available for walkers to record geocaches found along the way, with points available for visiting each one, or getting a stamp from participating businesses along the way. Small commemorative coins are awarded depending on the number of points scored.

=== Blairgowrie to Kirkmichael ===
Starting from the centre of Blairgowrie, the trail follows the River Ericht before climbing onto the wide expanse of Cochrage moor. After descending close to Bridge of Cally, the path comes to a T-junction where walkers can opt to travel towards Kirkmichael or Alyth. Following the signs to Kirkmichael, the trail enters Blackcraig forest and offers some fine views over Strathardle. This section is 24.9 kilometres (15.5 mi) in length.

=== Kirkmichael to Spittal of Glenshee ===
Although this section is, at 13.7 kilometres (8.5 mi), the shortest section in terms of length, it includes the trail's highest point. Skirting Kindrogan Wood on the West side of Strathardle, the path passes Tullochcurran Loch before crossing the river into Enochdhu. From here, the trail begins its long ascent through forest and open hillside to the col (An Lairig) between Ben Earb and Meall Uaine. On the ascent there is a wooden shelter known as the Dirnanean Estate upper lunch hut. After the mountain pass, the path quickly descends into Spittal of Glenshee.

=== Spittal of Glenshee to Kirkton of Glenisla ===
This leg of the journey begins with a leisurely walk down Glen Shee. Just after Westerton of Runavey, there is an alternative route to the left which climbs through some rough terrain to Loch Beanie and rejoins the main trail at Forter. The main route continues to follow Shee Water to the grounds of the superb Dalnaglar Castle. Now the route follows the B951 to Forter. Another side path climbs Mount Blair, which offers commanding views of the surrounding countryside on a clear day. Between Forter and Kirkton of Glenisla, the trail loops around Auchintaple Loch and descends by Loch Shandra. This section is 23.5 kilometres (14.6 mi) long.

=== Kirkton of Glenisla to Alyth ===
Over this stage the scenery mellows as the path returns toward Strathmore. This section can be walked by going west on the road from the Glenisla Hotel until the primary school, turning left, and crossing the iron bridge. Here the path climbs rapidly over moorland before passing by a string of farms. Many walkers take a short diversion to Reekie Linn. The trail then passes between Hill of Alyth and Hill of Loyal prior to reaching the village of Alyth, a distance of 17.4 kilometres (10.8 mi) from the Kirkton.

=== Alyth to Blairgowrie ===
North of the village, the trail climbs Hill of Alyth and passes through the extensive Bamff estate. From here, the route follows a quiet country road and passes through some mixed woodland before descending into Bridge of Cally. The final section of the Cateran Trail follows the same track as the very first stage, this time returning to Blairgowrie for a total distance of 24.1 kilometres (15.0 mi). A much shorter alternate route exists between Alyth and Blairgowrie. The trail progresses through the wooded Den of Alyth before passing the Tullyfergus farms and through Drimmie woods into Blairgowrie.
