= Ben Gulabin =

Coordinates: 56.833°N 3.476°W

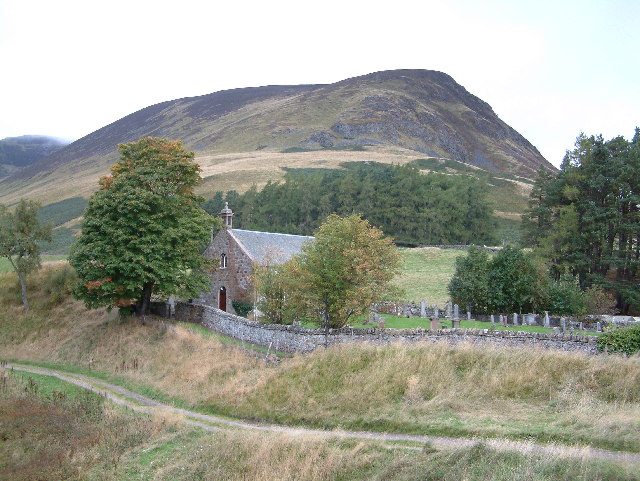
- Ben Gulabin from the Spittal of Glenshee

Highest point
- Elevation: 806 m (2,644 ft)
- Prominence: 203 m (666 ft)
- Listing: Corbett, Marilyn

Geography
- Location: Perthshire, Scotland
- Parent range: Grampian Mountains
- OS grid: NO100722
- Topo map: OS Landranger 43

Ben Gulabin (806 m) is a mountain in the Mounth area of the Grampian Mountains in Scotland. It is located on the eastern side of the main A93 road between Blairgowrie and Braemar in upper Glen Shee.

Rising steeply from the small settlement of the Spittal of Glenshee, Ben Gulabin is one of the simplest Corbetts to climb due to the high level start and short distance from the road.
