= Finegand =

Coordinates: 56.779398°N 3.409002°W

Finegand: Scottish Gaelic: Fèith nan Ceann
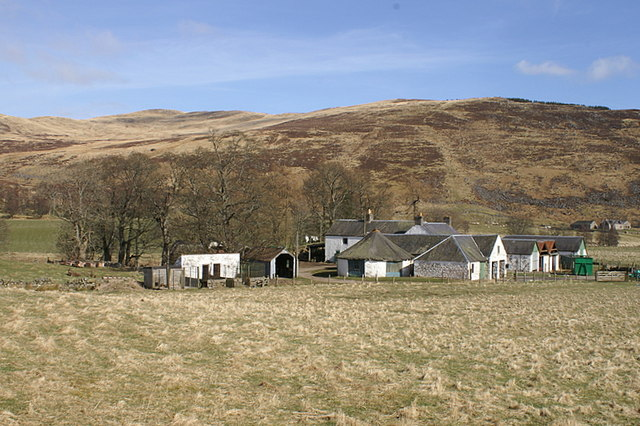
- Finnegand farm

- Location within Perth and Kinross
- OS grid reference: NO140662
- Council area: Perth and Kinross
- Lieutenancy area: Perth and Kinross
- Country: Scotland
- Sovereign state: United Kingdom
- Post town: BLAIRGOWRIE
- Postcode district: PH10
- Dialling code: 01250
- Police: Scotland
- Fire: Scottish
- Ambulance: Scottish
- UK Parliament: Angus and Perthshire Glens
- Scottish Parliament: Perthshire North

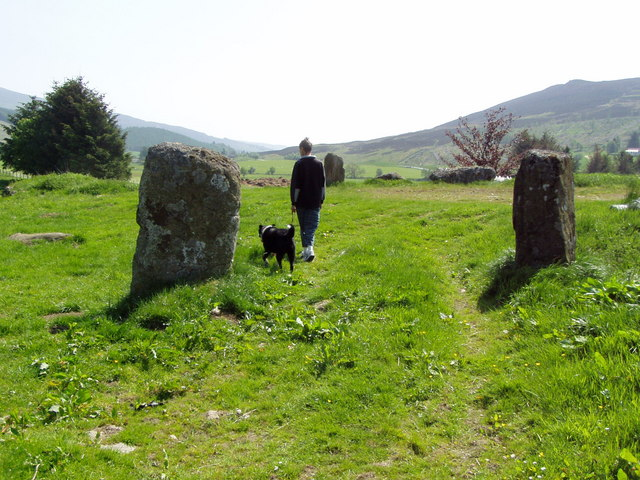
Broughdearg stones, near Finegand

Finegand is a farming hamlet located in eastern Perth and Kinross, Scotland and also refers historically to the portion of lands surrounding the hamlet. Finegand is located in Glen Shee and encompasses the lands east of the Shee Water adjacent to a burn which joins it about 4 miles (6 kilometres) below the Spittal and about 18 miles (29 kilometres) north of Blairgowrie.

The name is a corruption of the Gaelic Fèith nan Ceann, meaning "the burn of the heads" and takes its name from an event, which according to legend, took place sometime in the 15th century. Local history tells of 15th century tax collectors sent repeatedly to Glenshee, probably by the oppressive Earl of Atholl, to collect ever-increasing tax from the highlanders "in whatever manner they deemed most effective", usually at the point of a sword. On one occasion, the glensmen having become so enraged at the tax collectors' pillaging, not only killed them all, but cut off their heads and threw them into the burn.

Finegand and the surrounding lands were long associated with the Clan MacThomas although few clansmen remain in the glen, having fled or been forcibly disbursed after supporting the Jacobite cause.
