= Kirkton of Glenisla =

Coordinates: 56.729514°N 3.286187°W

Kirkton of Glenisla: Scottish Gaelic: Clachan Ghlinn Ìle
- Location within Angus
- OS grid reference: NO214605
- Council area: Angus
- Lieutenancy area: Angus
- Country: Scotland
- Sovereign state: United Kingdom
- Post town: BLAIRGOWRIE
- Postcode district: PH11
- Dialling code: 01575
- Police: Scotland
- Fire: Scottish
- Ambulance: Scottish
- UK Parliament: Angus
- Scottish Parliament: Angus South

Kirkton of Glenisla consists of a church and graveyard, a hotel, hall and several homes forming the largest concentration of habitation in Glenisla, Angus, Scotland. It is situated on the River Isla, eleven miles north-west of Kirriemuir and ten miles north of Blairgowrie, on the B951 road. The kirkton is situated adjacent to the 64 mile waymarked Cateran Trail. There is a suspension footbridge that was built in 1824 over the River Isla.

== The Small Monument ==
The Patrick Small Monument is located across the ford on the west bank of the River Isla opposite the Kirkton of Glenisla. This imposing obelisk stands on elevated ground and can be seen from around the village. Erected by the community, it stands in honor of Patrick William Small, a local land owner who died in 1870.

== Gallery ==
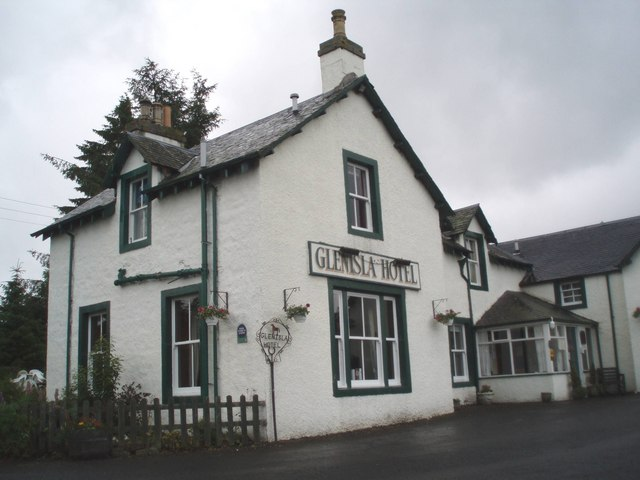
The Glenisla Hotel

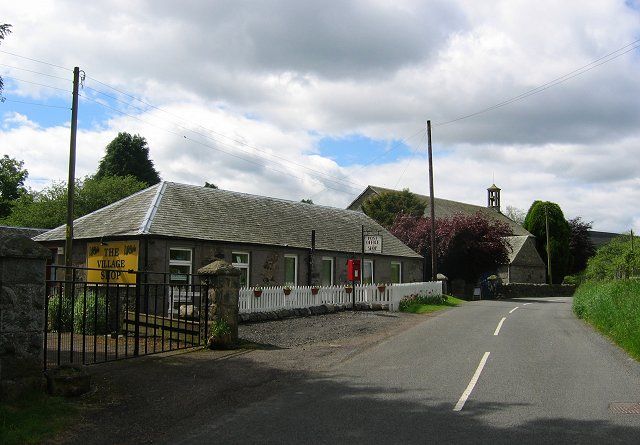
Former Village Shop and Kirk

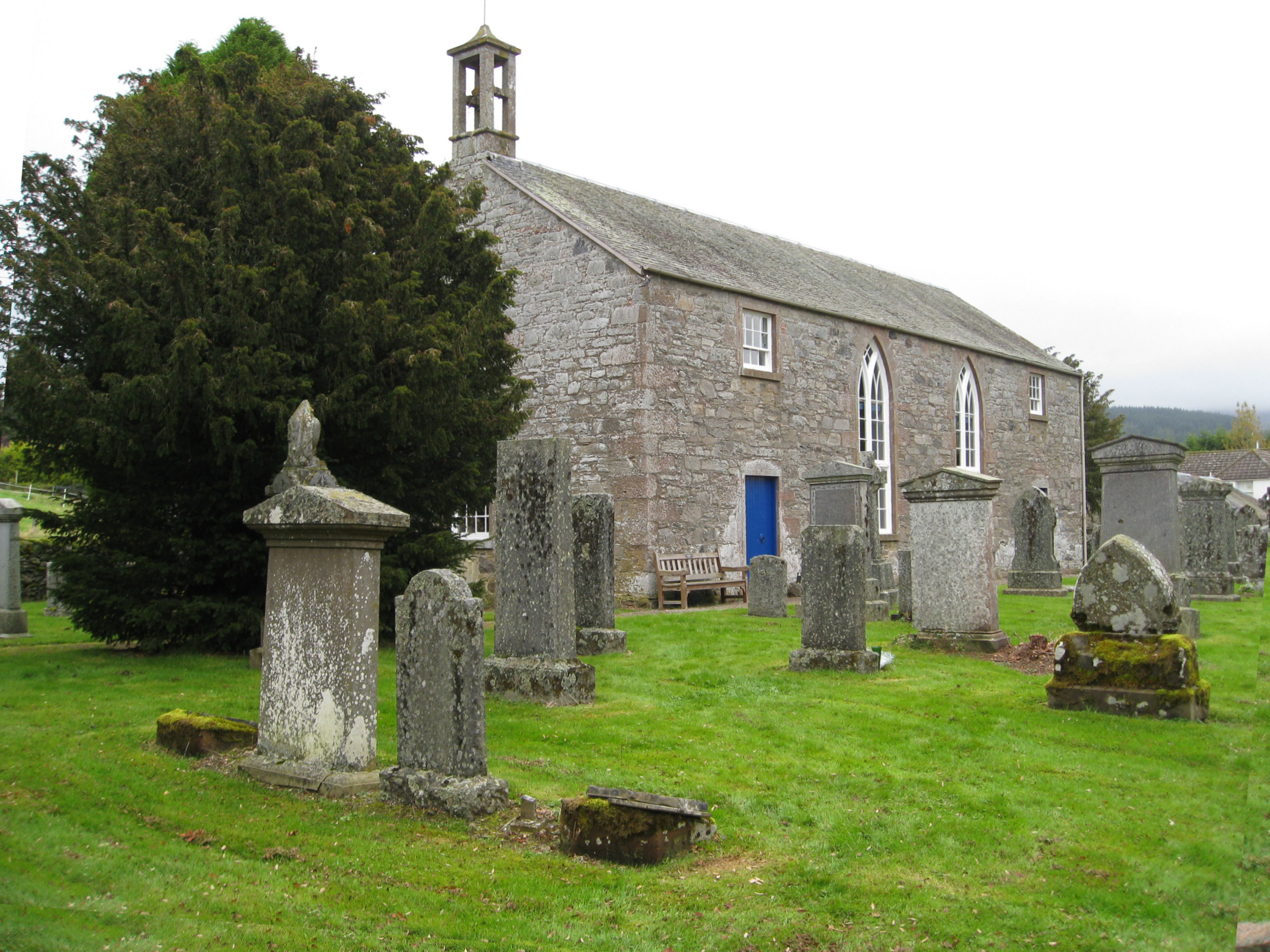
Kirk and Cemetery

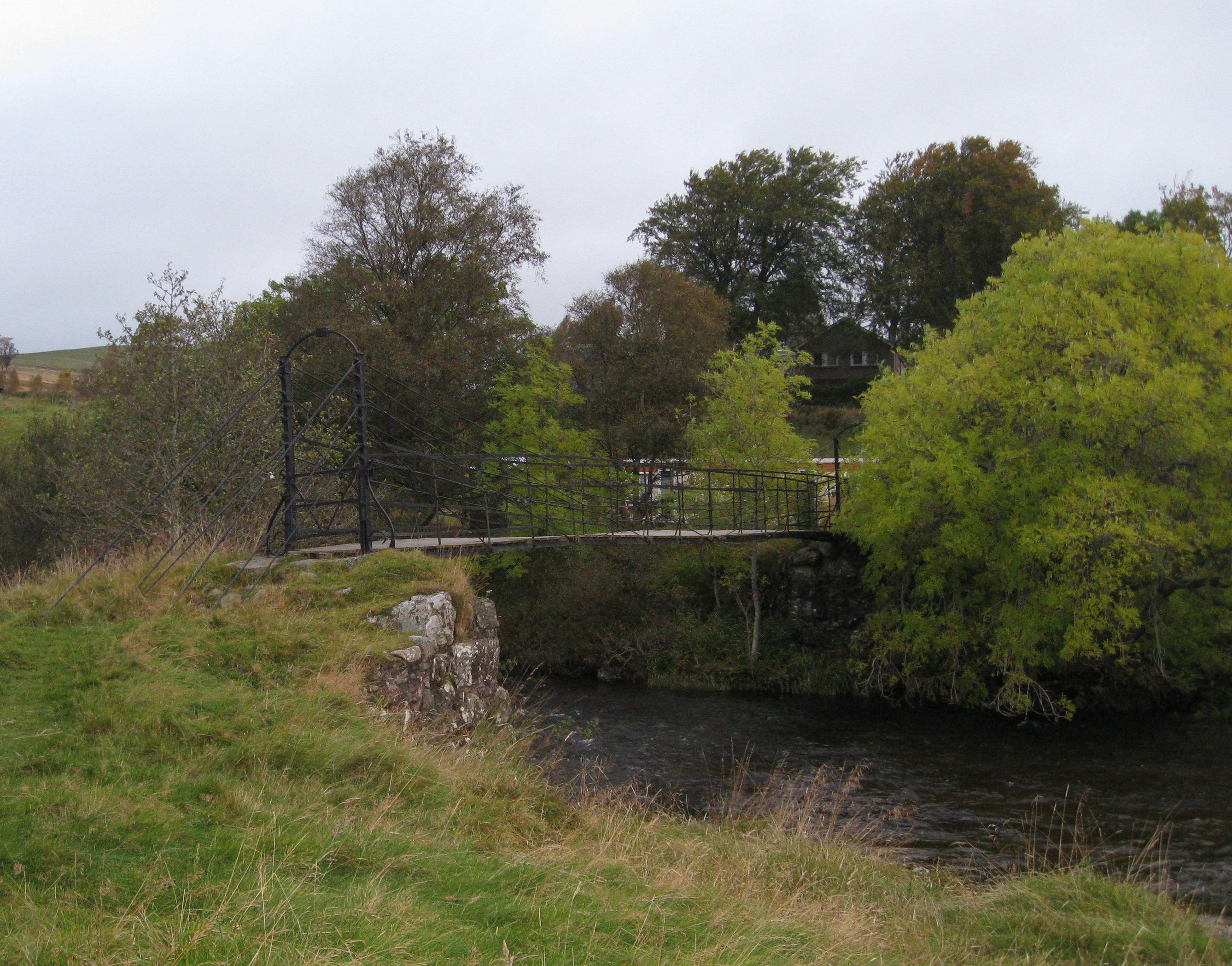
Swinging Bridge Over River Isla

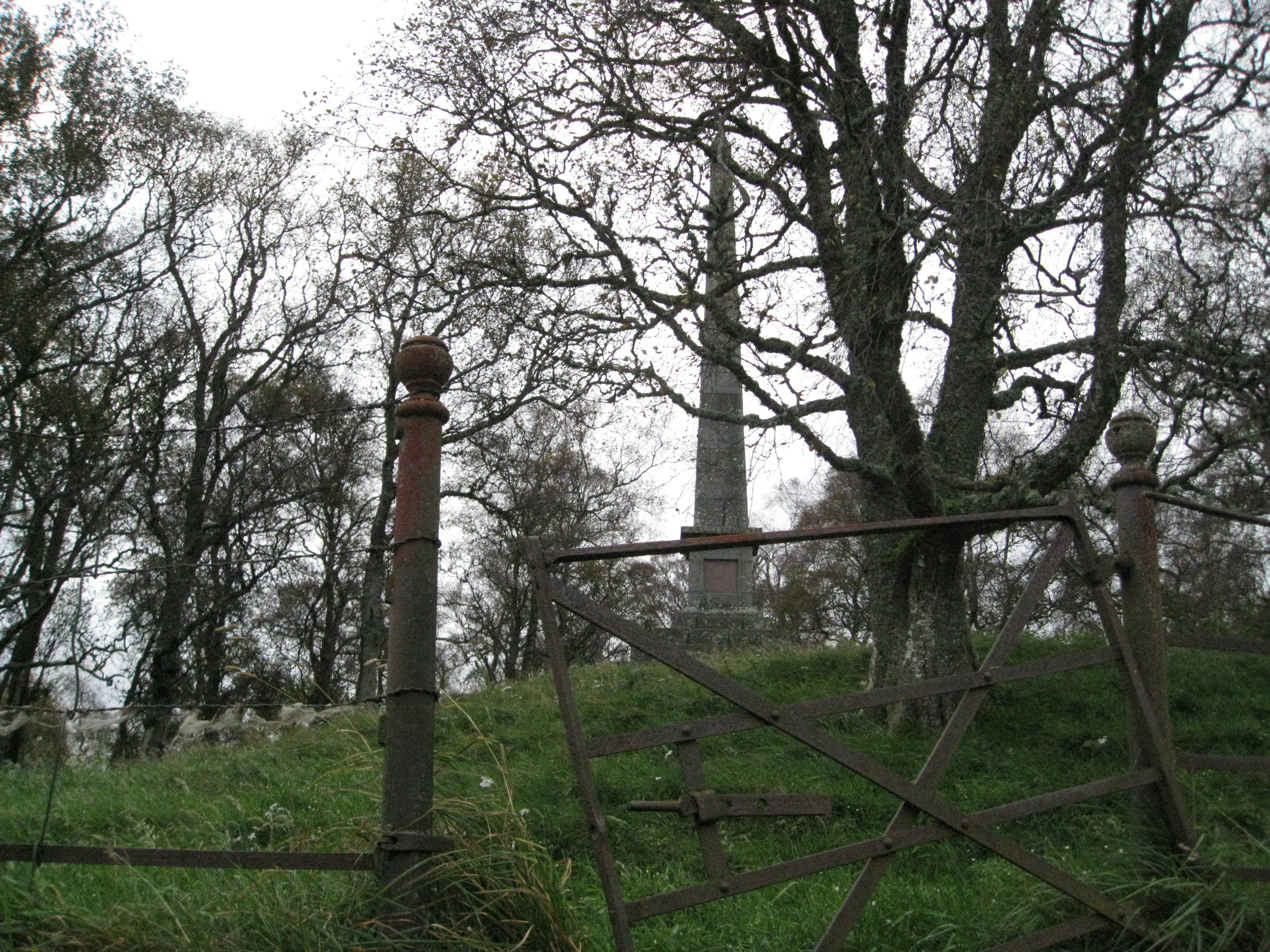
Patrick Small Monument
