= Clan MacThomas =

Highland Scottish clan

- Crest: A demi-cat-a-mountain rampant guardant Proper, grasping in his dexter paw a serpent Vert, langued Gules, its tail environing the sinister paw
- Motto: Deo juvante invidiam superabo (Latin: God help overcome envy)

Profile
- Region: Highland
- District: Perthshire

Chief
- Andrew Patrick MacThomas of Finegand,
- The Chief of Clan MacThomas. (MacThomaidh Mhor.)
Septs of Clan MacThomas
Combie, MacOmie, MacOmish, McColm, McComas, McComb, McCombe, McCombie, McComie, McComish, Tam, Thom, Thoms, Thomas, **Thomson
NOTE: ** signifies name could be of Clan MacTavish
Allied clans
Chattan Confederation
Clan Mackintosh
Clan Macpherson
Clan MacPhail
Clan MacBean
Clan Shaw of Tordarroch
Clan MacGillivray
Clan Davidson
Clan MacQueen
MacIntyres of Badenoch
Macleans of the North
Rival clans
Clan Farquharson
Clan Gregor

Clan MacThomas is a Highland Scottish clan, whose Lord Lyon recognized chief, Andrew Patrick MacThomas of Finegand, is a member of the Standing Council of Scottish Chiefs. They are also a member of the Clan Chattan Confederation.

== History ==
=== Origins of the clan ===
The progenitor of the Clan MacThomas was Thomas, who was a Scottish Gaelic speaking Highlander. He was known as Tomaidh Mòr and it is from him that the clan takes its name. He was a grandson of William Mackintosh, 7th chief of Clan Mackintosh and 8th chief of the Chattan Confederation. Thomas lived in the fifteenth century when the Clan Chattan had become so large that it was unmanageable, so Thomas took his clan from Badenoch, across the Grampian Mountains to Glen Shee where they re-settled. Here they flourished and became known as McComie, McColm and McComas which are phonetic forms of the Gaelic. The Clan MacThomas was described in a roll of the clans, in the Acts of Parliament of 1587 and 1595, and they were known to the government in Edinburgh as Macthomas.

=== 16th to 17th centuries ===
The early chiefs of the Clan MacThomas ruled from the Thom, which was opposite the Spittal of Glenshee on the east bank of the Shee Water. This is also believed to be the site of the tomb of Diarmid, of the Fingalian saga. In about 1600 Robert Mccomie of Thom, the fourth chief was murdered and the chiefship then passed to his brother John Mccomie of Finegand. The settlement of Finegand was about three miles down the glen and became the new seat of the chiefs. The name Finegand is a corruption of the Gaelic, feith nan ceann which means burn of the heads. This is said to be a reference to some tax collectors who were killed and whose heads were thrown into the burn.

The seventh chief was John Mccomie (Iain Mòr) who has passed into the folklore of Perthshire. Tax collectors, particularly those of the Earl of Atholl seem to have been offensive to him. The Earl employed a champion swordsman from Italy to slay Mccomie but the swordsman was himself slain by Mccomie.

During the Scottish Civil War of the 17th century the Clan MacThomas supported Charles I. Iain Mor MacThomas joined James Graham, 1st Marquess of Montrose in 1644 at Dundee. When the royalists captured Aberdeen, Iain Mor himself captured Sir William Forbes who was sheriff of Aberdeen and commander of the Covenanter cavalry. However the chief of Clan MacThomas withdrew his support from Montrose after he was defeated at the Battle of Philiphaugh and instead devoted his time to extending his lands which included purchasing the Barony of Forter from the Earl of Airlie.

After the Restoration of 1660 Macthomas was fined heavily by Parliament and the Earl of Airlie set about trying to recover some of his lands. Airlie's legal action was successful but the chief of Clan MacThomas refused to recognize this and continued to pasture his cattle on the disputed land. In response Airlie used his legal right to lease the land to men of the Clan Farquharson which led to a feud. On 28 January 1673 Farquharson of Broughdearg was killed along with two sons of Iain Mor MacThomas. The lawsuits that followed crippled the MacThomas chief and when he died in 1676 his remaining sons were forced to sell the lands.

The MacThomas chief is mentioned again in 1678 and 1681 in Government proclamations but the clan had begun to drift apart. Some moved south to the Tay valley where they became known as Thomson and others to Angus in Fife where they are known as Thomas, Thom or Thoms. The tenth chief took the name Thomas and then later Thoms. He settled in northern Fife and successfully farmed.

=== 18th century to date ===
The chiefly family fled to Fife where they became successful farmers before moving back across the Tay to Dundee where the family, with interests in property and insurance, prospered as the population of Dundee doubled in the 18th century. Other clansfolk moved to Aberdeenshire where one William McCombie of Tillyfour MP, became famous for breeding Aberdeen-Angus cattle. Patrick, the 16th chief, became Provost of Dundee in 1847 purchasing the Aberlemno Estate in Angus. His son, George, became one of Scotland's youngest Sheriffs (Judges) in 1870. When he died George left his fortune (£7.0 million in today's terms) to St Magnus Cathedral in Orkney, together with the Aberlemno Estate. His heir, Alfred, the 17th chief, contested the will in a famous court case in Edinburgh in 1905 but lost to the shocked dismay of his family. In 1954, the Clan MacThomas Society was founded by Patrick, 18th chief, who married a third cousin of Elizabeth II. His son, Andrew, the 19th and current chief, has dedicated much time to his clan with a result that you cannot be in Glenshee without being aware of the historic connection with Clan MacThomas.

Members of the clan from across the world gather every three years at the clan's land, "Clach Na Coileach" (The Cockstane), in Glenshee.

== Clan profile ==
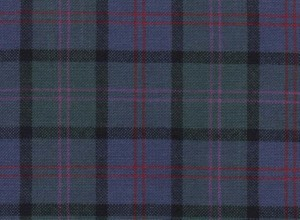
"Ancient" version of the MacThomas Tartan

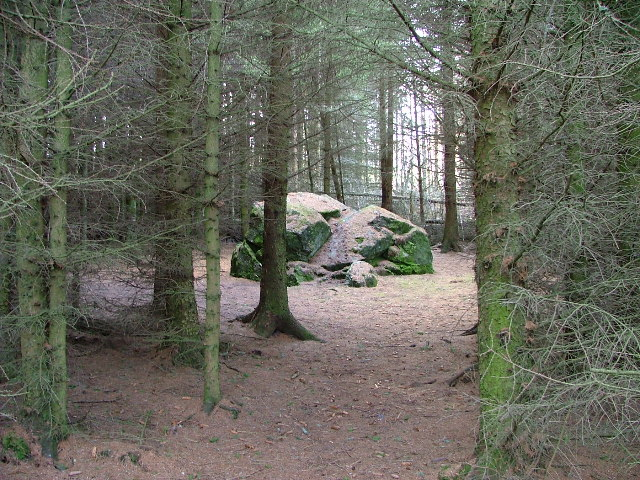
Clach na Coileach or Cockstane. Meeting place of the Clan MacThomas. They built their first settlement at Finegand

=== Motto and current chief ===
- Clan Motto: Deo juvante invidiam superabo (Latin) (With God's help, I will overcome envy).
- Clan Chief: Andrew MacThomas of Finegand, 19th Chief of Clan MacThomas.

=== Clan Septs ===
Sept names of Clan MacThomas (recognized by the Clan MacThomas Society):

- Combie
- MacOmie
- MacOmish
- McColm
- McComas
- McCombe
- McComb
- McCombie
- McComie
- McComish
- Tam
- Thom
- Thoms
- Thomas
- Thomson

Note: Prefixes Mac and Mc are interchangeable.

=== List of clan chiefs ===
| Chief | Name | Dates | Notes |
|---|---|---|---|
| 1st | Thomas (Tomaidh Mòr) | 15th century | Seated at the Thom, East bank of the Shee Water. |
| 2nd | John MacThomaidh of the Thom | Early 16th century | Son or Grandson of Tomaidh Mòr. |
| 3rd | Adam MacThomaidh of the Thom | mid-16th century | Son of John. |
| 4th | Robert MacThomaidh of the Thom | Murdered 1600 | The Thom was lost when his only daughter married a Farquharson. |
| 5th | John McComie of Finegand | 1600–1610 | Robert's brother; moved seat to Finegand. |
| 6th | Alexander McComie of Finegand | 1610–1637 | Married a Farquaharson and gained more land at Benzian Mor in Glenshee. |
| 7th | John McComie (Iain Mor) | 1637–1676 | Alexander's son; known as "McComie Mòr", greatly expanded territory and prestige of the clan; acquired lands and Barony of Forter in Glenisla (1651); rose to support Montrose in 1644 |
| 8th | James McComie | 1674–1676 | 3rd son of Iain Mor. |
| 9th | Thomas McComie | 1676–1684 | 5th son of Iain Mor. |
| 10th | Angus Thomas | 1684–1708 | Aka "Mr. Angus" educated at St. Andrew University, Fife; 6th son of Iain Mòr, anglicized surname, (dejure Chief). |
| 11th | Robert Thomas | 1708–1740 | Large estate at Cullarnie, later moved to Belhelvie; son of Angus, (dejure). |
| 12th | David Thomas of Belhelvie | 1740–1751 | Eldest son of Robert. Died Young. |
| 13th | Henry Thomas of Belhelvie | 1751–1797 | Second son of Robert. Continued to farm at Belhelvie. |
| 14th | William Thoms | 1797–1843 | Eldest son of Henry, became a merchant in St. Andrews, further Anglicized surname, died with no children. |
| 15th | Patrick Hunter MacThomas Thoms | 1843–1870 | Son of George Thoms (a son of Henry and half-brother of William). Provost of Dundee. Purchased estate of Aberlemno in Angus. |
| 16th | George Hunter MacThomas Thoms | 1870–1903 | Son of Patrick; Sheriff of Caithness, Orkney and Shetland. Bequeathed his vast fortune and lands to St. Magnus Cathedral in Kirkwall. |
| 17th | Alfred MacThomas Thoms | 1903–1958 | Writer to the Signet. |
| 18th | Patrick MacThomas of Finegand | 1958–1970 | Great-grandnephew of Patrick, the first Chief known to be officially recognized by the Lyon Court since Thomas McComie in 1676. Army Officer. Married a 3rd cousin of Her Majesty the Queen. |
| 19th | Andrew MacThomas of Finegand (MacThomaidh Mòr) | 1970-date | Current Clan Chief, Retired Banker. |

== See also ==
- Clan MacTavish of Dunardry for Thomson's from the Western Highlands
