= Bridge of Cally =

Coordinates: 56°38′48″N 3°24′17″W

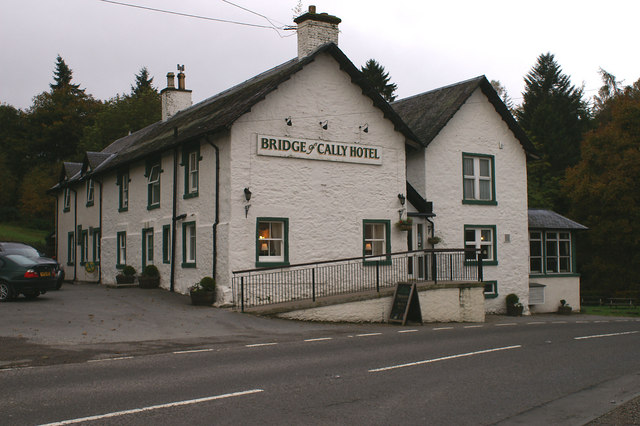
- Bridge of Cally hotel

- Location within Perth and Kinross
- OS grid reference: NO139514
  - Edinburgh: 49 mi (79 km)
  - London: 379 mi (610 km)
- Council area: Perth and Kinross
- Lieutenancy area: Perth and Kinross
- Country: Scotland
- Sovereign state: United Kingdom
- Post town: BLAIRGOWRIE
- Postcode district: PH10
- Police: Scotland
- Fire: Scottish
- Ambulance: Scottish
- UK Parliament: Angus and Perthshire Glens
- Scottish Parliament: Perthshire North

Bridge of Cally is a small village in Kirkmichael parish, Perth and Kinross, Scotland. It includes the smaller settlements of Strone of Cally and Netherton.

The village sits at the junction of three glens, Glenshee, Strathardle and Glenericht and is centred round the bridge over the River Ardle 200 m (220 yd) before it joins the Black Water (which drains Glen Shee as Shee Water) to form the River Ericht. The A93 road from Perth to Aberdeen crosses the bridge where it forms a junction with the A924 road to Kirkmichael and Pitlochry. The village is on the Cateran Trail long-distance path, and is popular in winter as it is near the Glen Shee skiing area.

The village has a hotel, a post office / general store, an angling book shop, a village hall and a large holiday park.

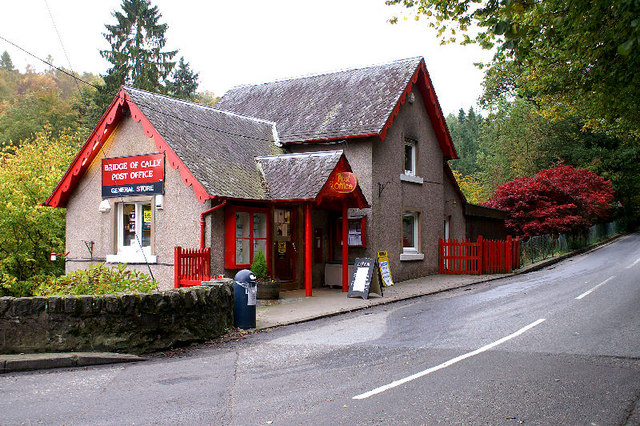
The Post Office and general store

The hotel was originally a temperance establishment with alcohol being served for the first time in the 1960s. Until that time it served as the local petrol station and the proprietor operated a daily bus service along the A93 from Blacklunans to Blairgowrie.

The local one-teacher school, known as Strone of Cally School, closed in 2011 and the site has been sold for house building. Pupils now attend school in Kirkmichael.

The bridge, for which the village is named, is a Category B listed building and nearby Cally House, an early 19th-century house, is Category C listed.

The village is in two parts with Bridge of Cally strictly comprising the hotel, post office and the houses and holiday park on the Kirkmichael road and Strone of Cally the houses and old school on the ridge above the bridge. A third settlement called Netherton lies 1/2 mile (800 m) away on the Drimmie road around a bridge over the Blackwater beside which is the old water powered wool mill. This closed in the 1950s and is now a house. The local parish church was built here in 1890 as part of the United Free Church of Scotland which amalgamated with the church of Scotland in 1928. Falling numbers led to a linkage with Glenshee & Cray parish which then linked with Kirkmichael and Straloch before a final merger with Rattray. Netherton kirk finally closed its doors in 2010 and is now the property of a local family.

Bridge of Cally is served by Stagecoach bus services to Blairgowrie, Kirkmichael and Glenshee and is 6 miles (10 km) from Blairgowrie.
