= Dalnaglar Castle =

Coordinates: 56.7656°N 3.3996°W

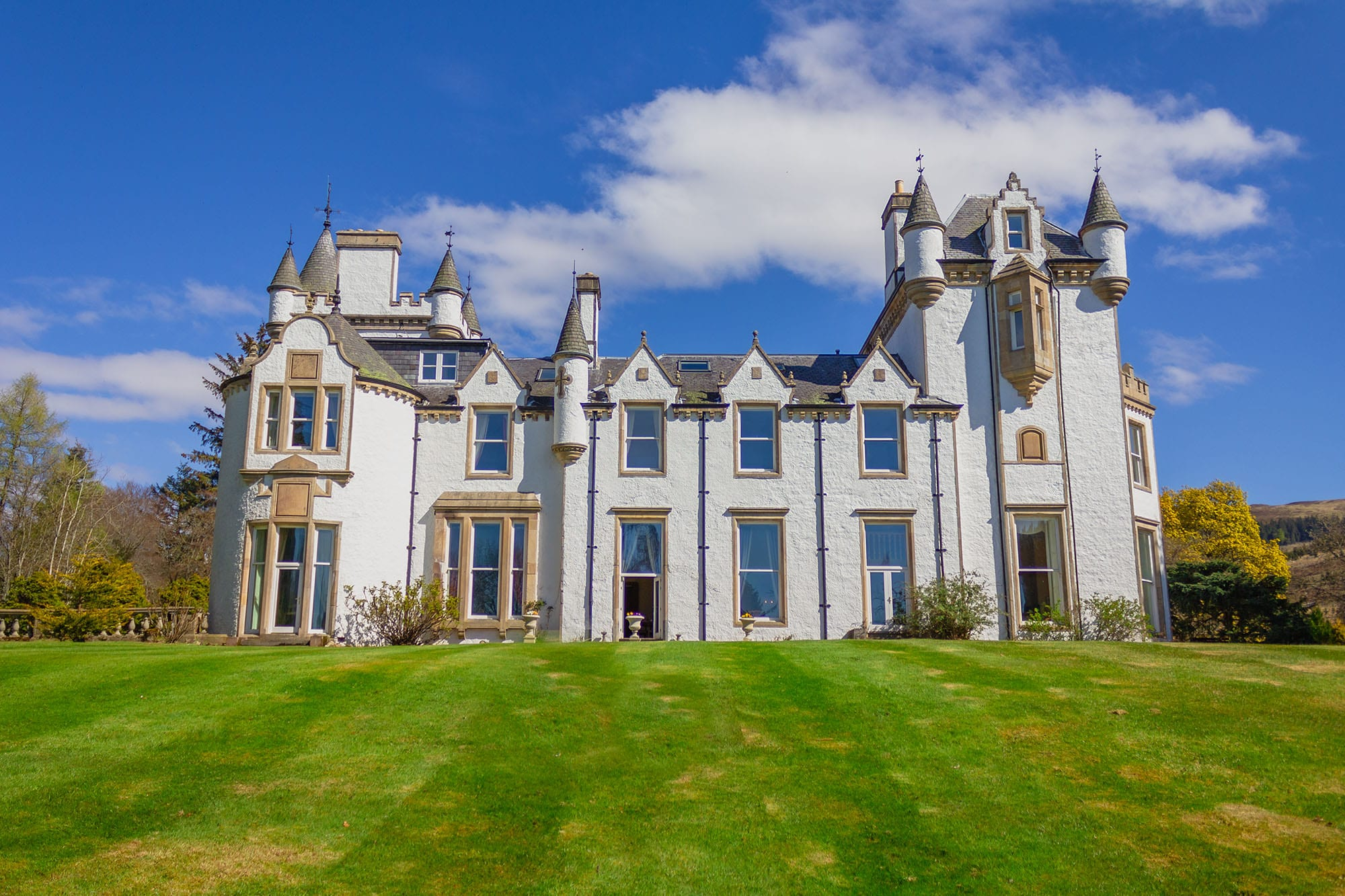

Dalnaglar Castle is a 19th-century castle, about 6.0 kilometres (3.7 mi) south of Spittal of Glenshee, Perth and Kinross, Scotland, on the east of the Shee Water.

== History ==
It is thought that the estate was formed in the late 18th or early 19th century. ‘Dalnaglar Cottage’ seems to have been the precursor of and core to the present castle, which was probably built as a hunting lodge. The present baronial mansion or ‘castle’ was built in 1864 for Robertson, from Blairgowrie, banker to Queen Victoria.

The castle is available for private hire holiday accommodation, weddings, team building events and other group activities. There are also 4 holiday cottages available within the estate grounds.

The first map to show a named building on this site was published between 1747 and 1755 following a military survey and spelt Dalniglear, but in Stobie’s map of 1783 the spelling had changed too Dalnaglar. The origins of the estate appear to have been Dalnaglar Cottage, built as a hunting lodge, inhabited by the Shaw family from the late 1700’s and Dalnaglar Castle was built in the early 1860s by Daniel Robertson, although he died before the castle was completed. The estate was sold in 1867 at a traditional ‘Roup’ for the reduced price of £10,000 as advertised in the Times.

== Structure ==
The main block has two storeys and is harled; there are two towers, one of three storeys and the other of three storeys and an attic.

Historic Environment Scotland's comment is "Detail coarse and incorrect", while describing the whole as a "Mid-Victorian baronial curiosity".

Part of the ground may at one time have been set out in the style of a Japanese garden.

== See also ==
- Castles in Great Britain and Ireland
- List of castles in Scotland
