= Little Forter =

Coordinates: 56.769°N 3.334°W

- Location within Angus
- OS grid reference: NO185649
- Council area: Angus
- Lieutenancy area: Angus
- Country: Scotland
- Sovereign state: United Kingdom
- Post town: BLAIRGOWRIE
- Postcode district: PH11
- Dialling code: 01575
- Police: Scotland
- Fire: Scottish
- Ambulance: Scottish
- UK Parliament: Angus
- Scottish Parliament: Angus South

Little Forter is a hamlet in Glen Isla, Angus, Scotland. It is on the River Isla, 13 miles (21 kilometres) north-west of Kirriemuir and 11 miles (18 kilometres) north of Blairgowrie, on the B951 road.

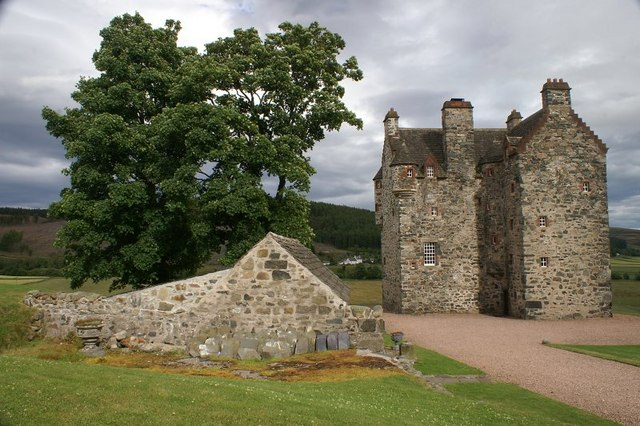
Forter Castle
