= Glen Shee =

Valley in Perth and Kinross, Scotland

Coordinates: 56°48′N 3°26′W

Glen Shee (Scotland)

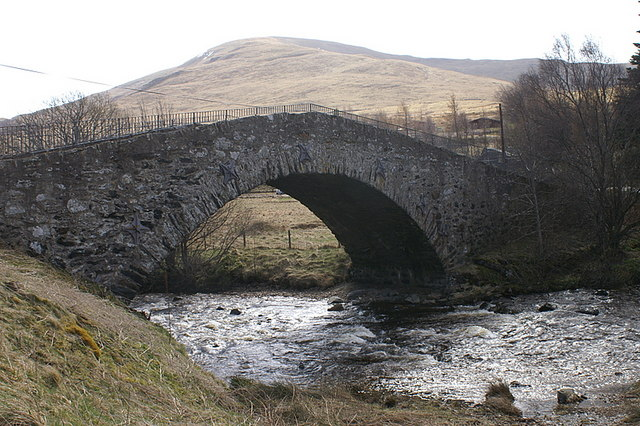
A by-passed Glen Shee Bridge

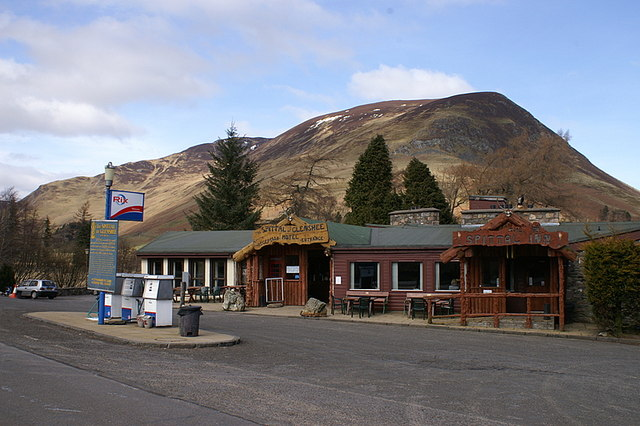
The rebuilt Spittal of Glenshee Hotel before the August 2014 fire

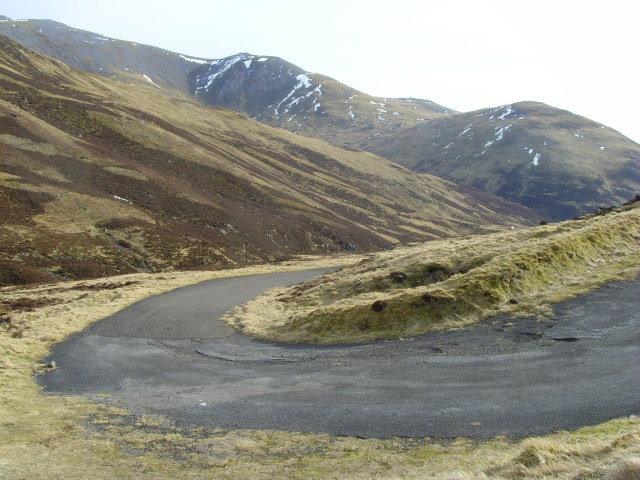
Part of The Devil's Elbow

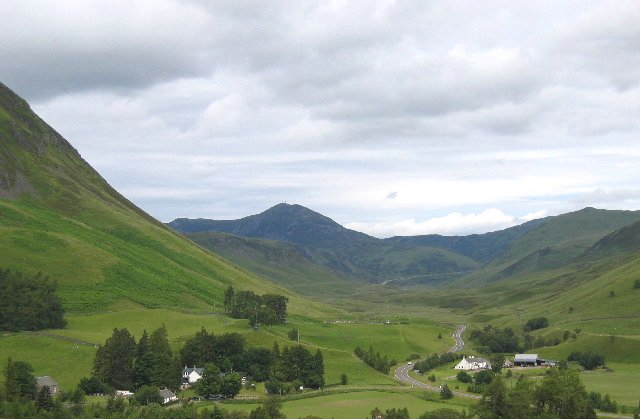
A view of Glen Shee from the Spittal

Glen Shee (Scottish Gaelic: Gleann Sith) is a glen in eastern Perthshire, Scotland. Shee Water flows through the glen. The head of the glen, where Gleann Taitneach and Glen Lochsie meet, is approximately 2 km north-west of the Spittal of Glenshee; it then runs south-east to Bridge of Cally where it merges with Strathardle to form Glen Ericht. Once known as the glen of the fairies it takes its name from the Gaelic "sith" meaning fairy and the old meeting place at the standing stone behind the present day church is called Dun Shith or Hill of the Fairies.

== Land Use ==
=== Pictland ===
Much of Glen Shee was open pasture by the early centuries of the first millennium, burned to stimulate the regrowth of the dominant Calluna heath and grazed at a level sufficient to prevent woodland regeneration. In the late seventh century, during the Pictish period, a new group of farms was established at Lair. Barley was the main cereal crop on the cultivated land, but oats and rye were also grown.

=== Kingdom of Alba ===
The farms that had been established in the Pictish period appear to have been abandoned in the late tenth century. While a reduced level of cultivation continued into the eleventh century and livestock remained present, a resurgence of native woodland suggests that a substantial reduction in the intensity of land use had taken place. It has been suggested that this may relate to a reassignment of access to land and natural resources under the dabhach system and an associated shift from dispersed to nucleated settlement.

== Settlements ==
The main settlement is the Spittal of Glenshee, now by-passed, which has a historic hotel, first run by monks from Coupar Angus Abbey to provide shelter and hospitality for travellers, hence the name "Spittal", an outdoor activity centre, self-catering lodges, the church and an original General Wade humpback bridge. The first record of a refuge for travellers there dates back to 961 AD. Over the centuries it has had an unenviable record of being destroyed by fire and in 1959 it was destroyed to be rebuilt in a Scandinavian style only to completely destroyed again in 2014. Currently it is a burned out shell.

At the Spittal, the Allt Lochay and Allt Beag join to form the Shee Water, which changes its name at Blacklunans to the Blackwater and eventually joins the River Ardle to form the River Ericht.

Other old settlements are at Finegand, Dalnaglar, Lair where there is a craft shop, cafe and tourist information point known as The Wee House, Cray, Mountblair, Blacklunans, Glenkilrie, Dalrulzion, Blackwater and Persie.

== Roads ==
The A93 road, part of General Wade's military road from Perth to Fort George, runs north through the glen and on into Glen Beag, where it crosses the Cairnwell Pass, which at an elevation of 2,200 feet (670 metres) is the highest public road in the UK. The road climbing to the summit is now wide and straight but until the late 1960s included two notorious hair-pin bends with a 1 in 3 (33%) gradient known as the Devil's Elbow. One of the most spectacular roads in Scotland, this was a favourite subject for postcards. It was so steep that at the bottom buses unloaded passengers who had to walk to the top and until it was rebuilt the AA maintained a well in a layby for overheating engines. Locally the pass is still known simply as "the Elbow". At Dalrulzion, the B950 leads off to Strathardle and Kirkmichael village (4 miles) and at the Lair the B951 leads over into Glenisla.

== Skiing ==
The Glenshee Ski Centre sits at the head of the Cairnwell Pass and is Scotland's biggest, with 21 lifts spread over four mountains and three glens and associated hire shops, cafes etc. Informal skiing started there in the 1930s, with the first tow being set up by the Dundee Ski Club in 1947. In the 1960s with road improvements easing access, the Glenshee Chairlift Company was set up, modern facilities were built and business boomed throughout the 1970s and 80s. A succession of mild winters and poor skiing conditions led to the Ski Company going into receivership but a management buyout ensured skiing survived and once again business is good.

Glenshee is known for high snowfalls and the A93 features regularly on the list of roads closed in adverse weather.

== Heritage ==
The old Church of Scotland kirk at the Spittal has regular services and its scenic setting makes it a popular wedding venue. There are disused churches at Netherton, Persie and Cray. The former Glenshee Lodge mansion became home to the Compass Christian Centre in the 1980s and provides a wide range of outdoor and indoor activities as well as courses and classes.

Dalnaglar Castle dates back to the 16th century and the current castle was built by the architect responsible for Balmoral Castle in the 19th century. It now provides tourist accommodation specialising in field sports and weddings.

== Accommodation ==
Hotels serving the glen sit at either end (Bridge of Cally Hotel to the south and Dalmunzie House Hotel to the north) and in Kirkmichael but there were at one time hotels at Blackwater (the Blackwater Inn which before that was a garage/shop/petrol station), Dalrulzion (the Dalrulzion Hotel, once a popular ceilidh venue), at Blacklunans (the Drumore Hotel) and at the Spittal.

Branching off at the Spittal is the private road up Glen Lochsie leading to Dalmunzie Hotel whose scenic 9-hole golf course opened in 1922, having been laid out by leading course designers Dr McKenzie and James Braid. The Dalmunzie Railway formerly ran from the hotel up to grouse moors.

The long established caravan site at Dalrulzion is a favourite with weekenders from Dundee and Fife. Between Finegand and the Lair is the historic Cockstane (Clach Na Coileach), the ancient meeting place of the Clan MacThomas. There is a car park and information board with all the history. Current members of the Clan MacThomas from across the world gather here regularly.

== Community Facilities and Services ==
Primary school children now attend Kirkmichael Primary and secondary pupils Blairgowrie High but there were originally primary schools at Strone of Cally, Blackwater and Glenshee. The former Blackwater School is now an outdoor centre for Dundee city schools.

Shops/post offices serving the glen are at Kirkmichael and Bridge of Cally. At one time there was a shop/post office at Blacklunans.

The old Glenshee Hall opposite Glenshee Lodge has been demolished but Blackwater Hall has been completely refurbished and modernised and is home to many local groups and functions.

In the 1960s a basic Fire Station consisting of an ex-army Nissen Hut was built by Perth & Kinross Fire Service within Finegand Farm steading with the appliance manned by local volunteers. In the 1990s this was replaced by a one alongside the A93 just south of Finegand with a modern appliance still manned by volunteers now trained by the Scottish Fire and Rescue Service.
