= Blairgowrie RFC =

Scottish rugby union club, based in Blairgowrie and Rattray

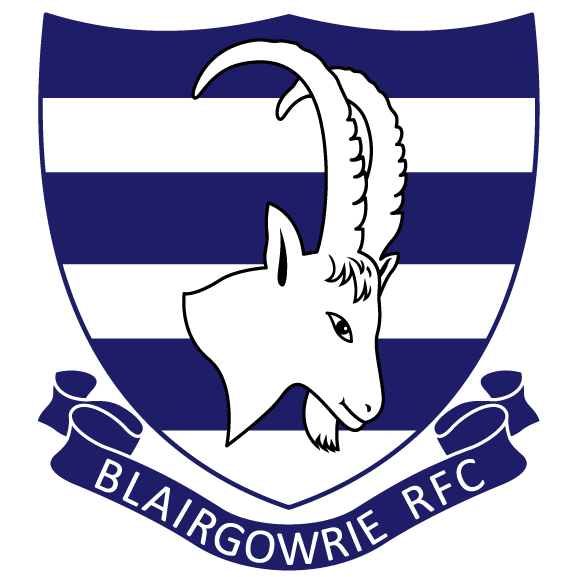
- Full name: Blairgowrie Rugby Football Club
- Founded: 1980
- Location: Blairgowrie, Scotland
- Ground: John Johnston Coupar Park
- President: Kevin Brown
- Coach(es): Campbell Watson, Dave Lewis
- Captain: Rory Grant
- League: Arnold Clark Caledonia Region League Division 1
- 2024-25: Caledonia Division One Midlands, 5th of 10
Team kit

Official website
- www.pitchero.com/clubs/blairgowrierfc

Blairgowrie RFC is a rugby union club based in Blairgowrie and Rattray, Scotland. The Men's team currently plays in Arnold Clark Caledonia Region League Division 1.

== History ==
There was a previous Blairgowrie rugby side in the 19th century which often provided players to the Perthshire county side to play Fifeshire. For example, P. D. Laing at full back and W. Robertson at quarter (Centre) in 1889.

=== Early years and formation (1948–1980) ===
Blairgowrie Rugby Football Club (BRFC) was established in 1980, but its origins are intertwined with the history of the John Johnston Coupar Sports Ground. This ground was purchased in 1948 by Mr. John Johnston Coupar.

A pivotal moment for rugby in Blairgowrie occurred when the Cricket Club requested the Trust to sell off the agriculturally tenanted land for housing to fund a professional cricketer. David Laing, a local commercial photographer and father of a Blairgowrie High School student, advised against this. Noting the growing interest in rugby at the High School, he suggested that a rugby club might eventually form in the town, advocating for the preservation of the land. This intervention ultimately saved the ground for the future formation of BRFC.

=== Development and growth at the high school pitch (1980–1985) ===
During D. McKechnie's presidency (1981-1983), the club held a vote to select a club badge. The options included an Osprey, a Raspberry, and a Goat (reflecting Blairgowrie's Gaelic translation, "The Plain of the Goats"). The Goat was chosen, with B. Walton producing artwork of a goat's head superimposed on blue and white horizontal stripes, which was then incorporated onto the club's dark blue shirts.

The club initially used the Blairgowrie High School pitch, changing facilities, and storage, with permission granted by the Head Teacher, A. Dunlop. Training sessions took place outside the Cricket Club pavilion, utilizing a loaned lighting column, and involved "brutal runs" up Newton Street. In 1982, Mr. Dunlop further supported the club by granting permission to install floodlights on the school buildings, enabling evening training. In recognition of his support, Mr. Dunlop was appointed Honorary Club President.

While playing at the High School, the club hosted various touring teams, including an American Army team and an English West Country team. The club also briefly hosted an annual "Fun Sixes Tournament" at the end of the season. Post-match gatherings occurred at the Cricket Club Pavilion, where Mrs. Williamson and her relatives, originally the Cricket Club's "Tea Ladies," agreed to provide post-match stovies, a tradition that became highly popular with both home and visiting teams.

In 1981, the club fielded three senior teams and undertook its first club tour to Llanbradach RFC in South Wales, led by D. McKechnie and S. Chisholm. The first club trophy, the Sandy McGhie Memorial Trophy, was gifted by David McKechnie in memory of his friend. Llanbradach RFC later reciprocated the tour on at least two occasions.

The idea for a rugby club gained momentum through discussions among regulars at the Ryefield Hotel (now Beech Manor Care Home). In August 1980, Bill Hunter took the initiative, placing an advertisement in the local newspaper, The Blairie, inviting interested individuals to a meeting at the Ryefield. This meeting, held on September 11, 1980, led to the official inauguration of the club as "Blairgowrie High School Former Pupils," with office bearers elected. Initially, the club fielded one senior and one colts (junior) team.

=== Establishing a home: the Coupar Sports Ground pitch (1983–1990) ===
In 1983, Blairgowrie RFC approached the John Johnston Coupar Sports Ground Trust for permission to develop a rugby pitch on the "Berry Field," the portion of the ground previously leased to agricultural tenants. Permission was granted, with the Trust retaining ownership. However, upon surveying the site, the club discovered that the Cricket Club had arranged a new tenancy with farmer Alan Niell, who had already cleared the berries and sown a cereal crop. Alan Niell graciously accepted the financial loss and allowed the rugby club to proceed. His son later became a regular player for the club.

The ground presented a significant challenge, with a one-meter deep dip running diagonally across the field. Earthmoving was carried out by McIntosh & Robertson, Caputh, to level the subsoil and replace the topsoil. Due to a shortage of approximately 500 tons of subsoil, a dip remained in the north-east corner. The grass seed mix was specified by R. Tate of the local Golf Club, and the seed itself was supplied by B. Anderson.

The main sections of the goalposts were salvaged by B. Walton from temporary bracing for a Glasgow warehouse, destined for scrap. A. Thom extended these and manufactured sleeves for installation. Club members, led by B. McLeod, excavated the post holes, and a team led by District Hydro Engineer M. Stevenson manually hoisted the posts into position. B. Hunter, using a theodolite, carefully positioned the pitch to avoid goal kicks landing in neighbouring gardens, a problem previously encountered at the High School. A. Thom also created a weather vane featuring the club's goat badge, painted by N. Anderson's father, an Alyth art school teacher, which now sits atop a goalpost.

The ground required extensive de-stoning. Dick Robertson of Blair Engineering provided a de-stoning machine free of charge, operated by T. Edwards, which removed approximately 70 tons of stone. This stone was then transported by C. Ambrose and tipped free of charge at a disused quarry owned by Sir William MacPherson. Despite these efforts, players continued to collect stones from the pitch in "tattie baskets" for the first two to three seasons.

The inaugural match on the new pitch was held in September 1985. The club treasurer, S. Robb, arranged for the visiting team.

To maintain the new pitch, D. McKechnie gifted a line marker. M. Stevenson placed an advertisement in The Courier, and Gleneagles Golf Club generously donated a trailed 6-gang mower, deemed suitable for the club's weekly cutting needs. The club and the Hockey Club also acquired an old tractor from the now defunct Cricket Club.

In October 1985, a shed was needed for kit storage and the newly acquired tractor. M. Stevenson's advertisement in The Courier led to a retired bricklayer from Aberdeen offering his holiday chalet in Dunkeld free of charge. A team of club members, led by R. Donaldson, dismantled and re-erected the shed at the park.

The next major project was the construction of changing rooms. The Trust granted permission, again retaining ownership of the ground. Perth & Kinross Council (PKC) awarded the club a grant, and the Scottish Rugby Union (SRU) offered a loan, which was personally guaranteed by individual club members. These members then undertook fundraising efforts to repay the loan, including raffling donated, past-sell-by-date beer from William Lows supermarket. The building, costing approximately £25,000, was a "Design & Build" project by B. Walton Ltd, leveraging significant discounts from subcontractors and suppliers, along with some pro bono work. Construction commenced in October 1986.

In 1987, a game was held to celebrate the completion of the changing rooms. A Blairgowrie invitation team, captained by K. Henderson, played against the Co-Optomists, captained by then-Scotland captain Findlay Calder. A. Thom crafted a shield featuring the club's badge, which was originally displayed in the changing rooms and is now on the clubhouse wall.

=== Mid-1990s to early 2000s: junior rugby and continued development ===
In the early 1990s, with the appointment of SRU Development Officers, B. Walton and B. McLeod met with Ian Robertson, the Development Officer for their district, to push for the formation of junior rugby in Blairgowrie. In 1993, a meeting of interested parents at the Ryefield Hotel led to the inauguration of the Junior Section, with N. Harding installed as President. This foundational work paved the way for the later establishment of the "RAM's" junior section.

Further notable matches at the ground included a Midlands District match between North & Midlands U18 and Glasgow U18 teams in December 1994, and a game between Blairgowrie Over 35s and Edinburgh Academicals Over 35s in April 1995.

In October 1997, a Ladies team was fielded by the club, marking a significant expansion of its playing opportunities. Also in October 1997, a second pitch was created, and floodlights were installed on the West touchline to facilitate evening training. The posts for this new pitch were supplied by R. Donaldson and transported to the site by W. Leszkowski's truck, driven by T. Edwards.

The club celebrated its 20th Anniversary Dinner at the Red House Hotel on October 21, 2000.

Originally, Blairgowrie RFC played friendly matches, with fixtures arranged at an annual meeting of Club Fixture Secretaries. The club was persuaded by Scottish Captain David Leslie to drop the "HSFPs" (High School Former Pupils) suffix from its name, after which it officially became affiliated with the SRU. At some point, a league structure for Scottish rugby evolved, integrating the club into competitive league play.

In 2001 the Club Committee raised over £25,000 which was used to refurbish the clubhouse under the auspices of the then president Nigel Harding, Treasurer Duncan MacRae and long serving committee member and player Ralph Donaldson who has probably been one of the most significant contributors to the Club’s survival over the years. The newly furbished club was officially opened in May 2001 by Sir William MacPherson of Clunie, a long standing supporter of the Club, following a match against Watsonians Rugby Club led by former British Lion and Scottish Internationalist Scott Hastings.

In 2003/04 Blairgowrie went on to win the Midlands League Division B.

In 2007/2008 Blairgowrie went on to win the Scottish Hydro Electric Caledonia Midlands League Division 2 scoring 546 points in the process while only conceding 102 points in total.

In 2009 the Blairgowrie Rugby Club Constitution was revised.

In March 2013 Blairgowrie were awarded the prestigious Scottish Rugby Club of the Month award giving rise to a film crew spending a day at the Rugby Club followed by an invitation to attend the SRU Awards Dinner in Murrayfield, which 60 Blairgowrie players and committee members attended. Later in 2013 Blairgowrie Rugby Club hosted the Scottish International Mens Rugby Squad training with hundreds of people converging on the J J Coupar Park to watch the training sessions.

In 2015, it was decided that Blairgowrie RFC would host an Ale Festival. A small team was formed, led by Kevin Brown, with Stephen Souter and Fraser Bissett playing key roles. The first Blairgowrie Ale Festival was held alongside the annual 10s rugby tournament, with the aim of creating an event for the wider town and community, rather than just a rugby-focused occasion.

With four main organisers—Kevin Brown, Stephen Souter, Fraser Bissett, and Peter Duncan—the entire club now comes together on a voluntary basis to deliver one of Blairgowrie’s premier events. The Ale Festival has played an important role in supporting the growth of the club, helping to keep it vibrant and sustainable, with all proceeds reinvested into both youth and senior rugby.

In February 2017 the Blairgowrie Senior XV made history by winning a League game 172-0.

This was followed with Blairgowrie winning their first ever Midlands Bowl beating Dundee Medics 28-6 in the Final. This was followed by a National Semi Final win against Strathendrick RFC 20-17 meaning that Blairgowrie would be contesting The National Bowl Final at Murrayfield against Portobello RFC with Blairgowrie losing 33-23 in a keenly contested game.

In season 2022/2023 Blairgowrie were crowned Midlands League Division II Champions and again in season 2023/2024.

In season 2023/2024 Blairgowrie won the Midlands Bowl (for the second time in their history) beating Glenrothes RFC 21-13. This meant that they would be contesting the National Bowl Final again where they narrowly lost to Irvine RFC 35-32.

In 2025/26, under the presidency of Kevin Brown, funding was successfully secured through sponsorship from Castle Water and John Ferguson to support the introduction of a Community Coach at Blairgowrie High School. Sebastian Goodman, a former Ram, was appointed to the role and delivered excellent results, attracting new youth players to the club and enabling the establishment of both U14s and U15s teams.

Between 2020 and 2025, the clubhouse underwent significant refurbishment. This included the replacement of all internal and external windows and doors, full re-cladding of the front of the building, roof resurfacing, installation of new decking, and replacement of the front slabs. The bar cellar was completely redesigned and rebuilt into a modern cold storage space with air conditioning, while all electrical systems in both the cellar and bar area were upgraded to meet current standards. The gym was also enhanced with new equipment, creating a fully functional space for player strength development and injury rehabilitation.

During the tenure of Club President Kevin Brown and Secretary Scott Wightman, matchday hospitality has grown, with up to 60 visitors regularly attending pre-match lunches. These are catered by Moira Crilly-Orr, whose ongoing support continues to add value to the club experience.

In the 2025/26 season, a player cap initiative was introduced, proposed by Vice Captain Fergus Baron and supported by Andy McCouat and Duncan MacRae. Through extensive work reviewing historical records, they successfully matched players to appearances dating back to the club’s inception. The initiative was further supported by Blairgowrie Garage, who sponsored the caps and helped fund their production.

It was agreed that all centurions would receive a player cap at the annual Legends Day, while current players would be awarded caps at key milestones: 50, 100, 150, and 200 appearances. That year’s Legends Day was a standout occasion, with over 35 former centurions attending a pre-match presentation hosted by Kevin Brown and Duncan MacRae. The event was a tremendous success, reconnecting past players—many of whom had not visited the club for years—and encouraging their ongoing involvement. Notably, former players travelled from as far as Canada (Gavin Wynd) and South Africa (Mark Reddin) to attend.

Throughout the season, current players have also been presented with caps to mark their achievements. These presentations have become special moments for both players and the wider club, recognising commitment and encouraging continued involvement for years to come.

In season 2024/2025 Blairgowrie narrowly missed out on being promoted to the National Leagues after finishing in second place in Midlands League Division I.

In the 2025/2026 season, Blairgowrie RFC finished 5th in the league, which was a fair reflection of the campaign. A higher finish may have been achievable; however, a number of significant injuries throughout the season impacted consistency and results on the field.

Off the field, the clubhouse continued to thrive, with increased attendance before and after matches. Supporters, members, and sponsors were welcomed at every home fixture, with Kevin Brown and Scott Wightman hosting matchdays and ensuring a strong club atmosphere.

The Legends Day at the start of the season was a major highlight, with former players receiving their centurion caps. The event successfully re-engaged past players, many of whom are now regularly attending matches.

The club also hosted its annual Ladies Day, which saw record attendance and sold out once again—another standout occasion in the club calendar.

In addition, the now-established Oktoberfest, organised and run by Scott Wightman, continues to grow in popularity. With up to 100 attendees, the event sells out quickly each year and has become a key annual fixture.

== Sides ==
Blairgowrie runs various sides during the year including men's, women's and juniors. The Blairgowrie Rams are its junior club and the rams are run for boys and girls aged 5 to 17. During the spring and summer months the club also holds a "Free to all Touch Rugby evening".

== Blairgowrie tens ==
Blairgowrie host an annual rugby tens tournament; which takes place alongside the Blairgowrie Ale Festival.

== Blairgowrie RFC in the news ==
The club hit the headlines in June 2021 when one of the players went into cardiac arrest - he was saved by his teammates using CPR and then a defibrillator.

== Honours ==
- BT National Bowl
  - Champions (1): 2016-17
  - Champions (2): 2023-24
  - Caledonian League 2 winners two successive occasions.
