= McCombe =

McCombe is a (patronymic or paternal) family name. Variants of which include: McColm, McComb, McComber, McCome and McKomb.

McCombe is one of the sept names of the Scottish Clan MacThomas.

Notable people with this surname (or similar) include:

- Alan McCombes (born 1955), Scottish politician
- Jamie McCombe (born 1983), English football (soccer) defender
- Jim McCombe (1932–2011), Leader of the Golden Hawks RCAF air demonstration team
- John McCombe (born 1985), English football (soccer) defender
- Lt-Col John McCombe of the Royal Corsican Rangers
- John McComb Jr. (1763–1853), Architect of New York City Hall and many other buildings in NY and NJ
- Leonard McCombe (1923–2015), Manx-born American photojournalist
