= River Ardle =

River in Scotland

Coordinates: 56°38′N 3°24′W

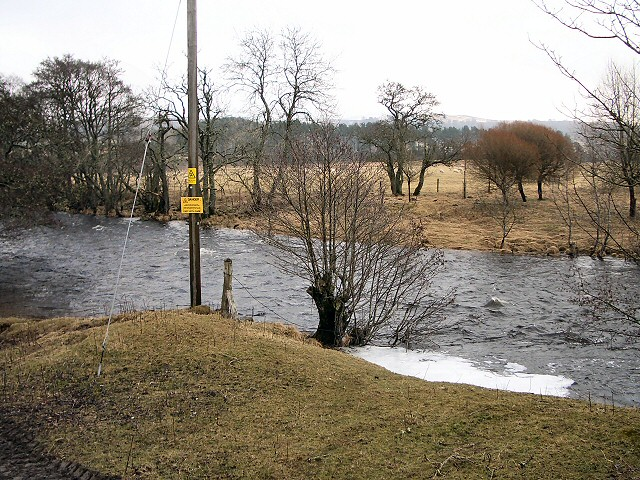
River Ardle in spate, downstream from Kirkmichael

The River Ardle (Scottish Gaelic: Abhainn Àrdail) is a tributary of the River Ericht. It runs for 10 miles (16 km) through Strathardle in Perthshire, Scotland. It is a salmon and trout river.

== Course ==
The river is formed by the confluence of the Brerachan Water and the Allt Fearnach at Straloch, 3 miles (4.8 km) from the top of the strath. It flows past Kindrogan House and Enochdhu, where it takes in the Dirnanean Burn, and then through Kirkmichael. It flows on past Ballintuim and Bridge of Cally, half a mile south of which it joins the Black Water to form the River Ericht. The Ericht is a tributary of the River Isla, which in turn flows into the River Tay.

The Ardle is bridged at Enochdhu, Kirkmichael, Pitcarmick, Dalnabreck, Ballintuim, Blackcraig, Cally Lodge and by the A93 at Bridge of Cally.

== Ardle's Grave ==
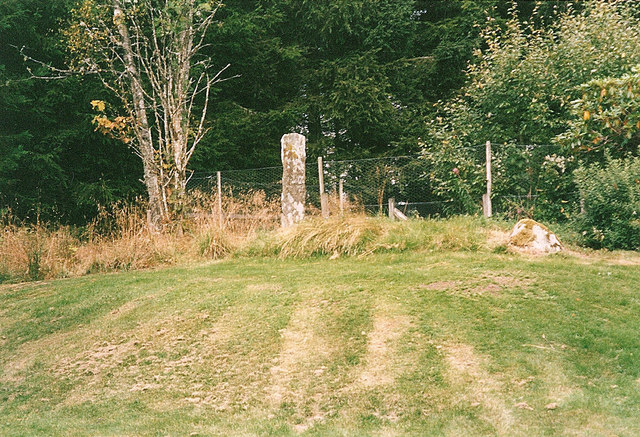
Ardle's Grave

The name Ardle is derived from a Pictish warrior who was killed in battle fighting the Danes at Enochdhu in 903 AD. He was reputed to be a giant, and the mound of his supposed grave is located in the garden of Dirnanean Lodge in Enochdhu. It is 19 feet (5.8 m) long, and around 3 feet (0.91 m) wide. At its end is a 5-foot (1.5 m) high monolith. The origin of this stone is unknown but it is thought unlikely to be prehistoric.
