= Shee Water =

River in Perth and Kinross, Scotland

Coordinates: 56.81296°N 3.45940°W

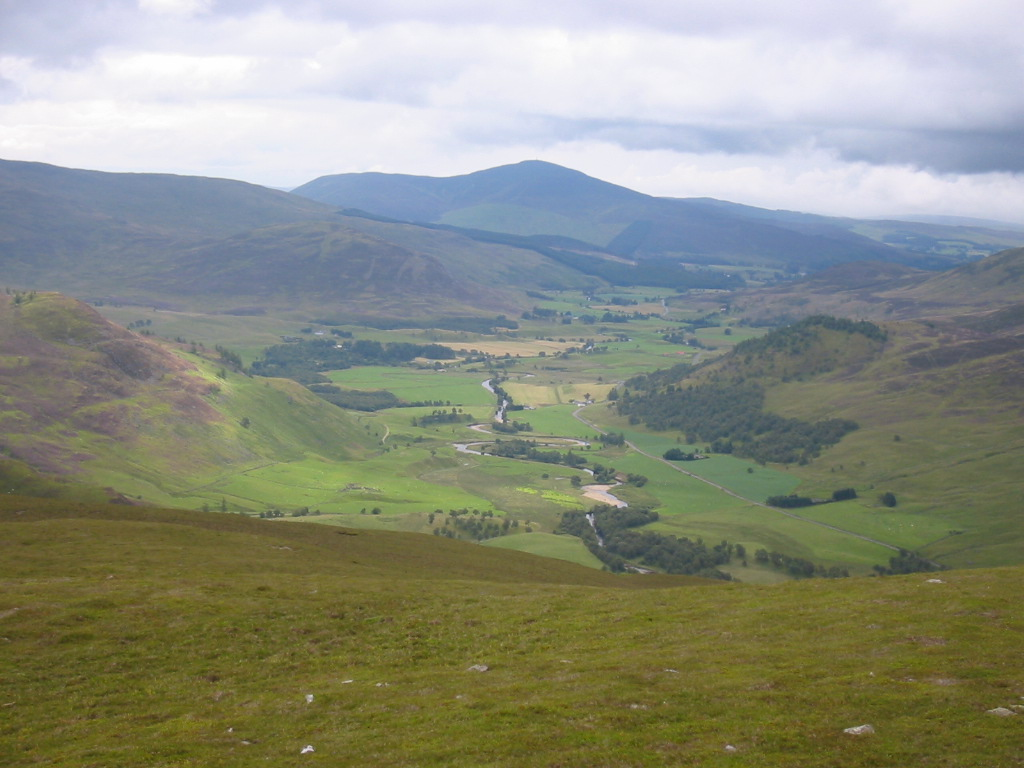
Shee Water from Ben Gulabin towards Mount Blair

The Shee Water (Scottish Gaelic: Sìdh / Uisge Sìdh) is a river in the highland portion of eastern Perth and Kinross, Scotland. The Allt a' Ghlinne Bhig, Allt Ghlinn Thaitneach and Glen Lochsie Burn (plus numerous smaller streams) drain south out of the Grampian mountains. They converge at the Spittal of Glenshee to form the Shee Water. This runs through Glenshee to the Strathmore valley where it becomes the Black Water for a short distance and, close to Bridge of Cally, joins the River Ardle to form the River Ericht. The Water eventually reaches the North Sea via the River Isla and the River Tay.
