= Cateran =

Scottish warrior

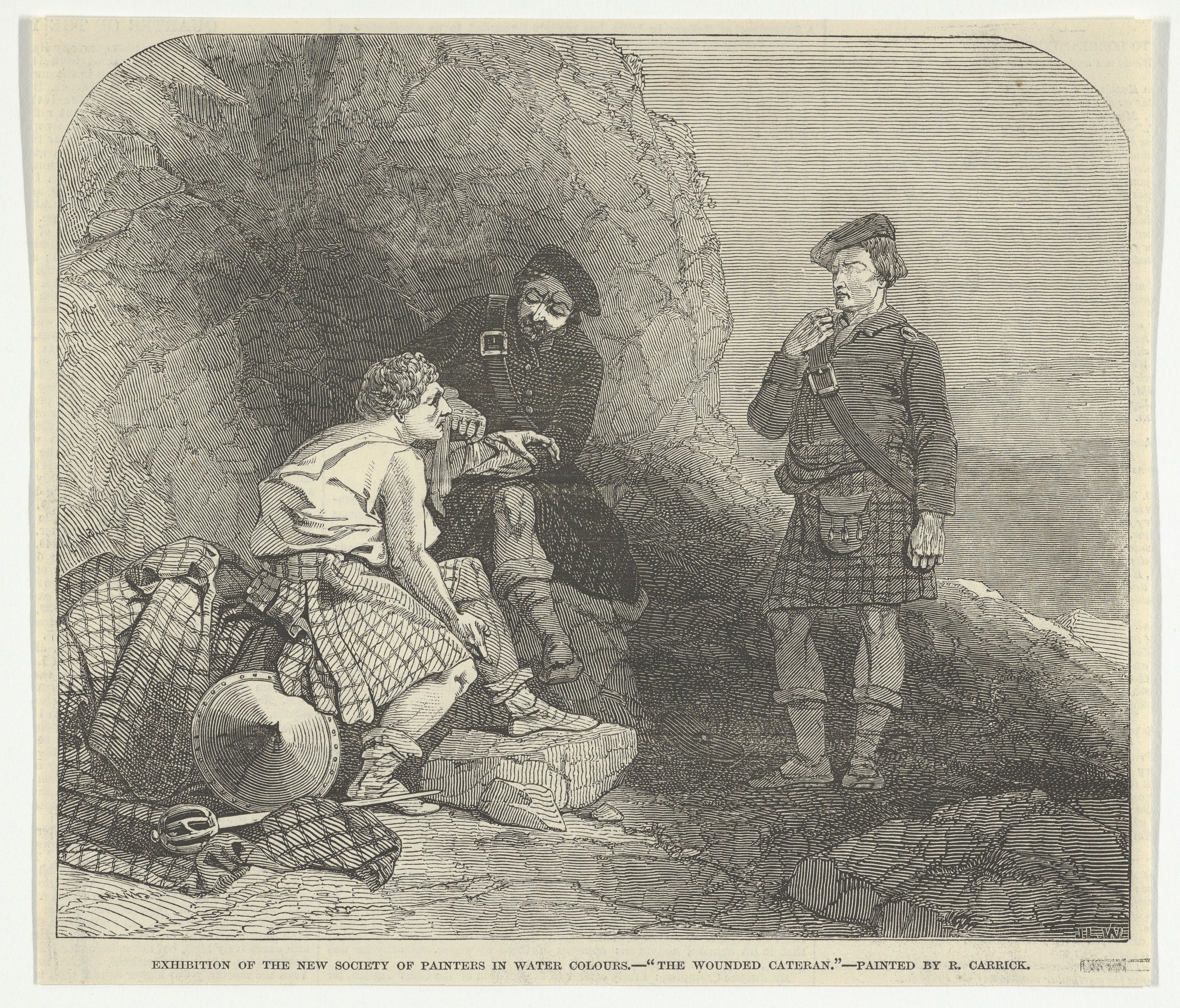
The Wounded Cateran by Robert Carrick

The term cateran (from the Gaelic ceathairne, a collective word meaning "peasantry") historically referred to a band of fighting men of a Scotland Highland clan; hence the term applied to the Highland, and later to any, marauders or cattle-lifters. An individual member is a ceithernach or catanach, but Walter Scott calls an individual a cateran (e.g. in Rob Roy, Chronicles of the Canongate). According to Randy Lee Eichoff it derives from Old Celtic 'cat' (battle, war) and 'nach' (man, fellow) Catanach means war-man, warrior. Its plural is ceithern or ceithrenn or caithereine or kettering or kettenring and several other spellings.

They are mentioned in the Dunkeld Litany:

A cateranis et latronibus,
a lupis, et omni mala bestia,
Domine, libera nos.

From caterans and robbers,
from wolves, and all evil creatures,
Lord, deliver us.

Magnus Magnusson states that some Highland chieftains retained substantial private armies of professional soldiers, known as 'ceatharn', to be used against their neighbours

Problems arose when the third royal son of King Robert II, Alexander Stewart, Earl of Buchan (the King's Lieutenant for areas of Scotland north of the Moray Firth) began using a force of 'caterans' himself. Subsequently, the word 'cateran' came to refer to those Highland bandits or malefactors.

Caterans feature in many Scottish novels and short stories, notably Hamish MacTavish Mhor in Walter Scott's 'The Highland Widow'.

Stories of the Cateran cattle-raiding tradition of the Scottish clans can be found in 'School of the Moon' by Stuart McHardy.

== See also ==
- Kern
- Cateran Trail
