= River Isla, Perthshire =

River in Angus and Perthshire, Scotland

Coordinates: 56.52711°N 3.36224°W

The River Isla (Scottish Gaelic: Uisge Ìl) is a tributary of the River Tay in Angus and Perthshire, Scotland. It rises in the Grampians before flowing down through Glen Isla into the Valley of Strathmore. After a course of 46 miles (74 km), it falls into the Tay near Meikleour. Its tributaries include the Ericht.

== Gallery ==
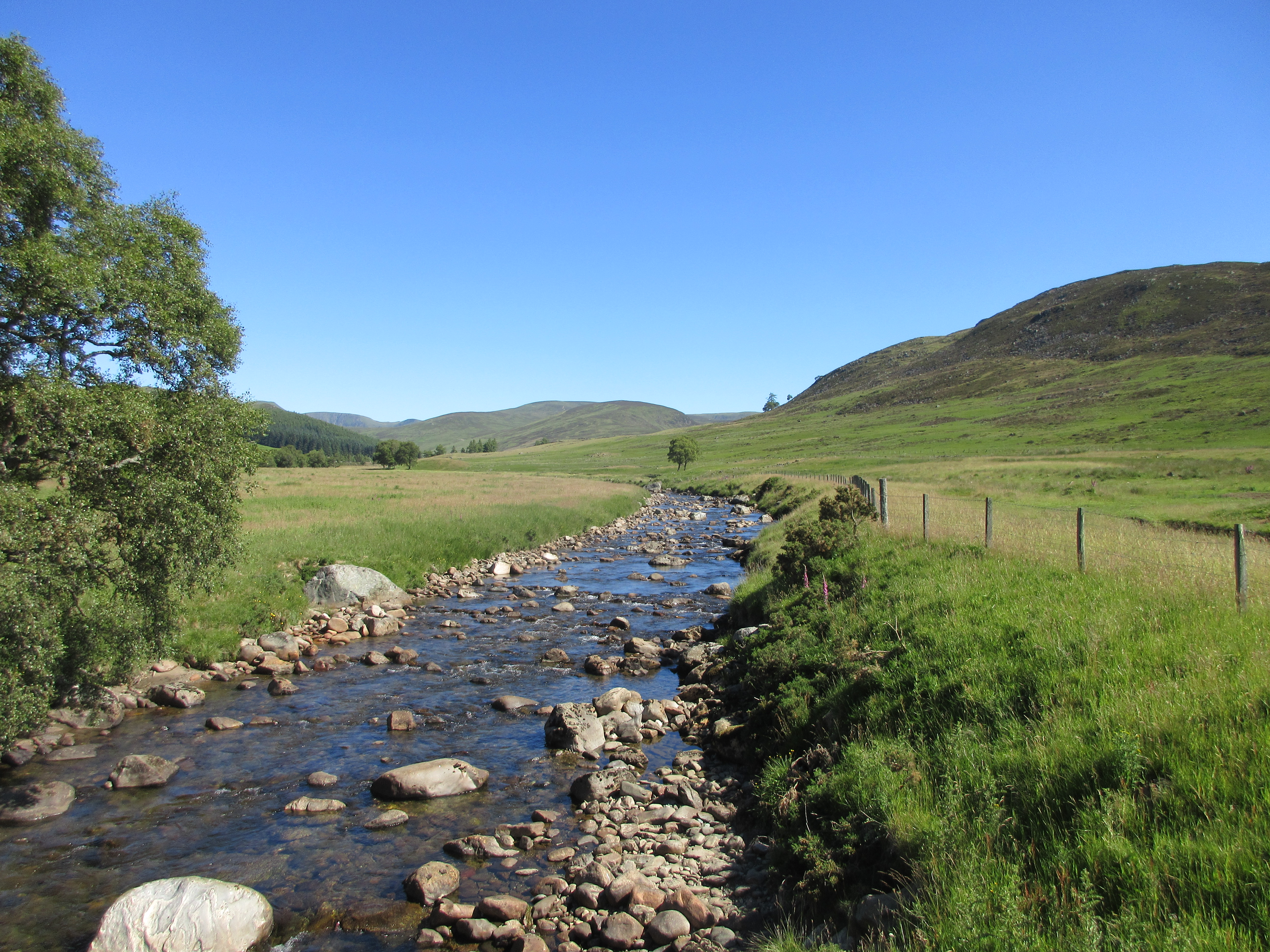
The river flowing through Glen Isla

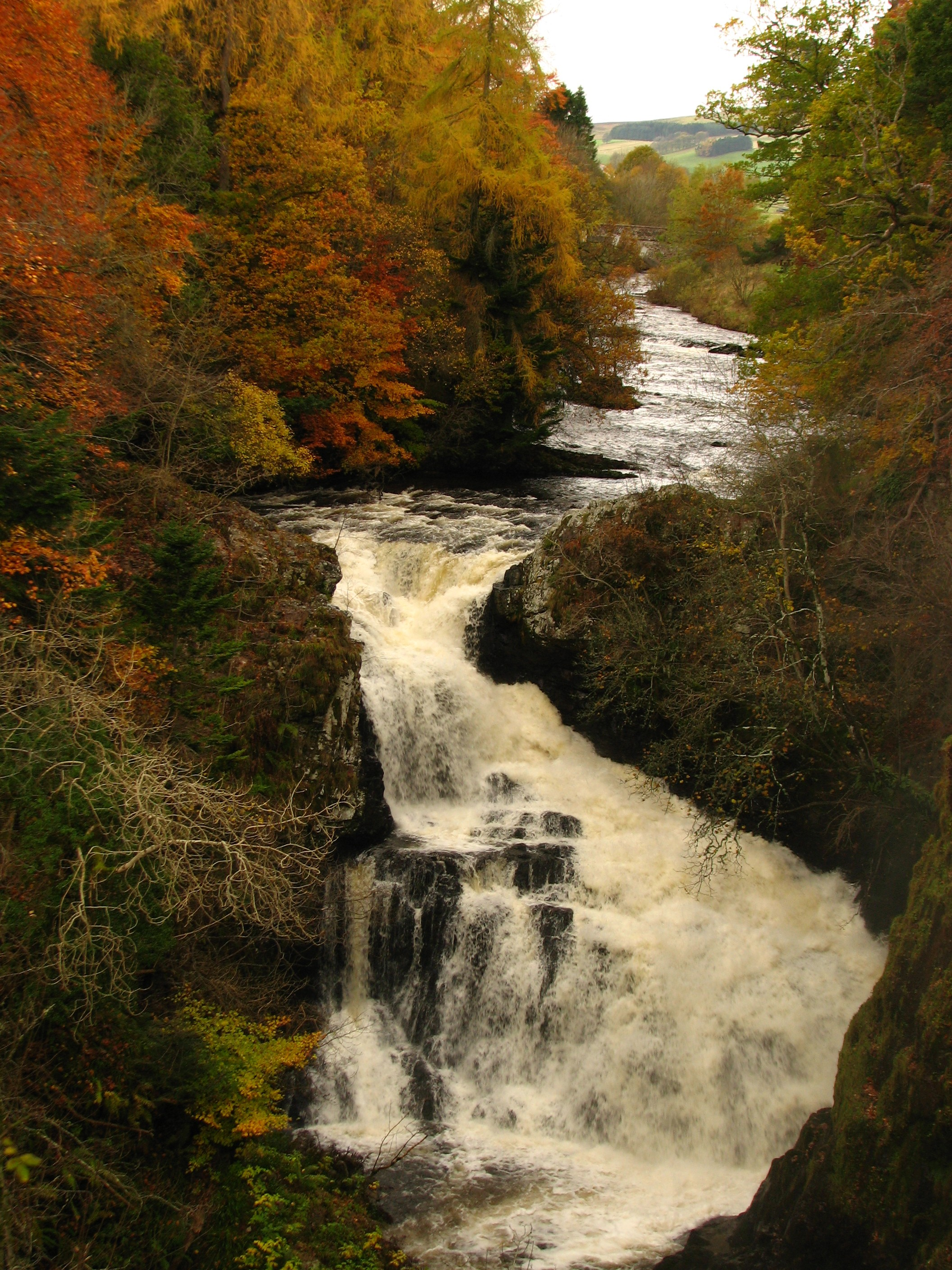
Reekie Linn falls

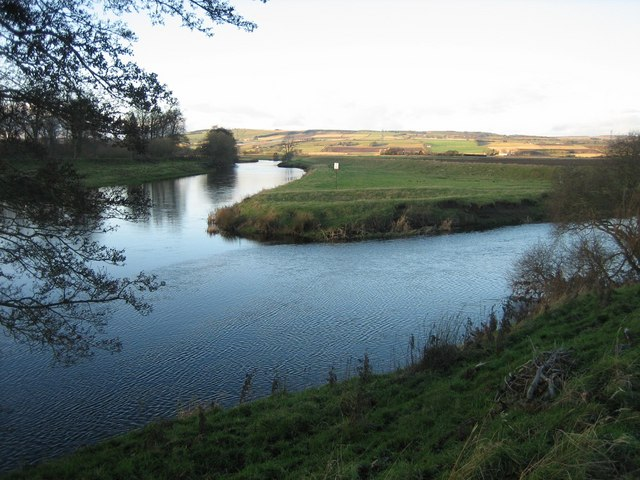
The confluence of the Isla and the Ericht

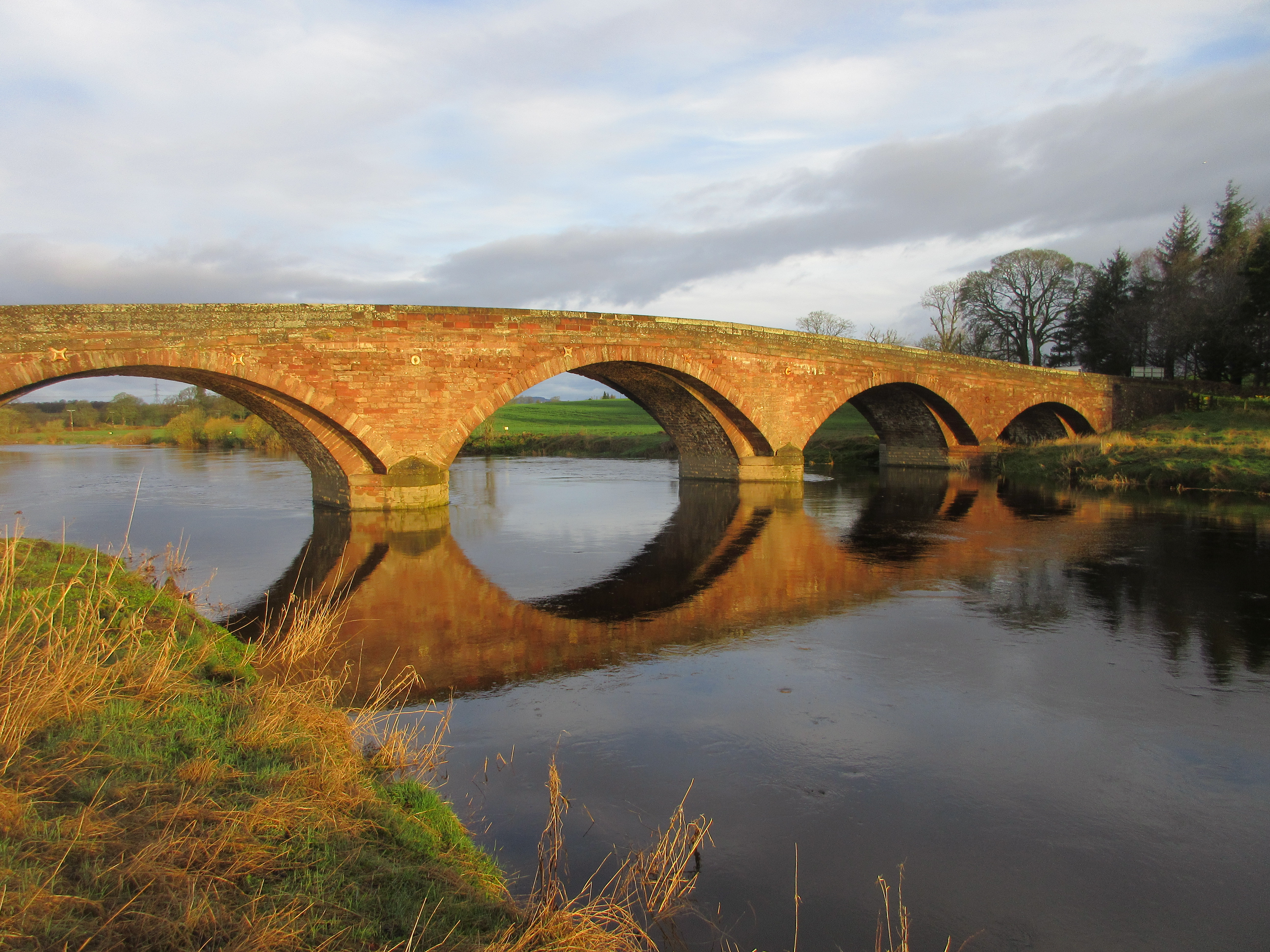
The Bridge of Couttie, near Coupar Angus

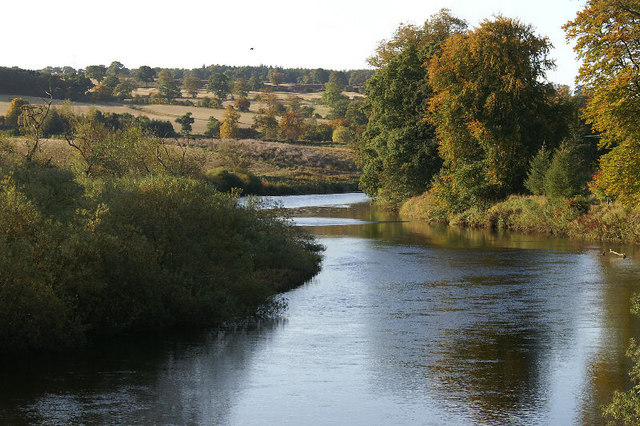
The river at Meikleour

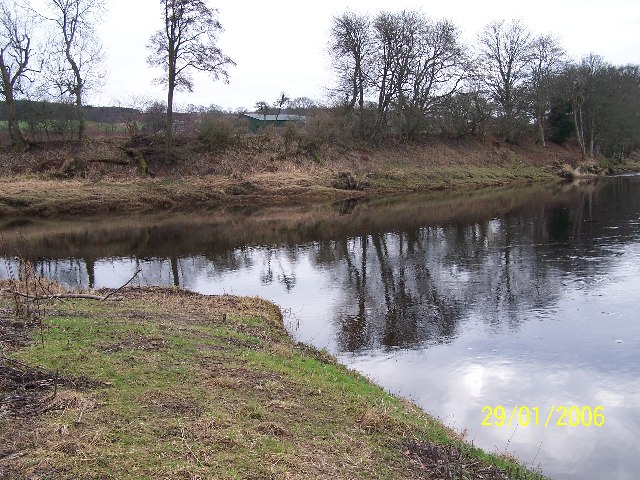
The confluence of the Isla and the Tay (grid reference NO519379)

== See also ==
- Eassie Stone
- Kilry Glen
- Kinloch
