= Reekie Linn =

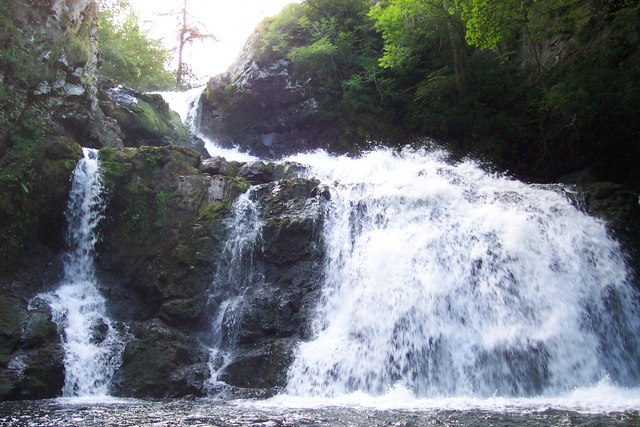
- Reekie Linn waterfall below Bridge of Craigisla

- Location within Scotland
- Location: Angus, Scotland
- Coordinates: 56.669294°N 3.218656°W
- Watercourse: River Isla

Reekie Linn is a waterfall on the River Isla in Angus in Scotland. Located a short 5-minute walk from the public car park north side of Bridge of Craigisla. Continue past fall to the turn to get a portrait view of the falls.

== See also ==
- Waterfalls of Scotland

== See also ==
- Waterfalls of Scotland
