= River Ericht =

River in Perthshire, Scotland

Coordinates: 56°34′N 3°14′W

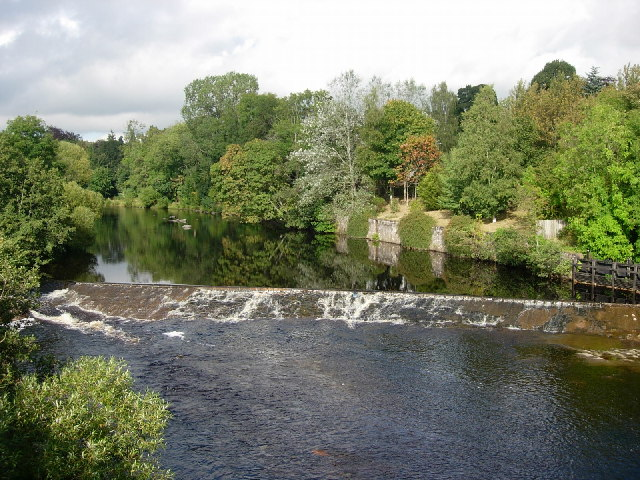
River Ericht at Blairgowrie, looking upriver.

The River Ericht (Scottish Gaelic: Abhainn Eireachd) is a river in Perthshire, Scotland formed from the confluence of the rivers Blackwater and Ardle at Bridge of Cally.

It runs south for around 10 miles before discharging into the River Isla, and eventually the River Tay. The river cuts through the impressive Craighall Gorge before dissecting the burgh of Blairgowrie and Rattray.

The fast running water of the river was once used to power several textile mills. Game fishing for salmon and trout is possible on some stretches with an appropriate licence.
