= Spittal of Glenshee =

Coordinates: 56.813859°N 3.459440°W

Spittal of Glenshee: Scottish Gaelic: Spideal Ghlinn Sìdh
- Location within Perth and Kinross
- OS grid reference: NO110701
- Council area: Perth and Kinross
- Lieutenancy area: Perth and Kinross
- Country: Scotland
- Sovereign state: United Kingdom
- Post town: BLAIRGOWRIE
- Postcode district: PH10
- Dialling code: 01250
- Police: Scotland
- Fire: Scottish
- Ambulance: Scottish
- UK Parliament: Angus and Perthshire Glens
- Scottish Parliament: Perthshire North

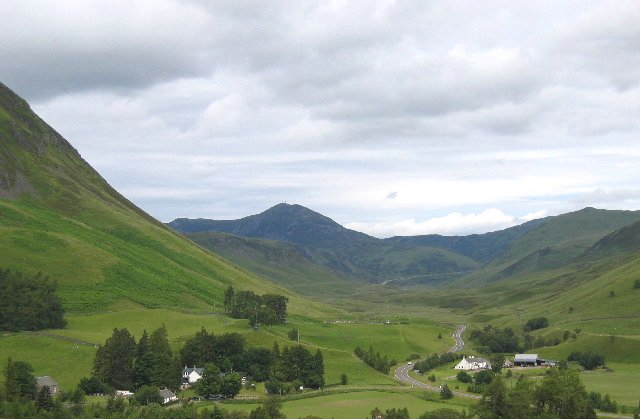
Looking north to the Cairnwell Pass, Spittal of Glenshee is in the foreground.

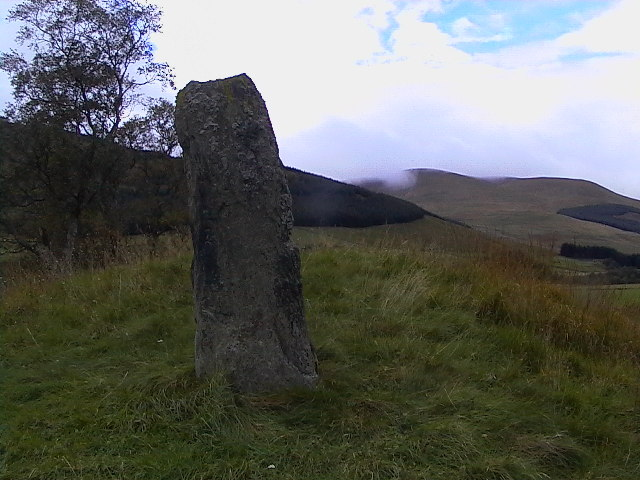
Standing stone at Spittal of Glenshee

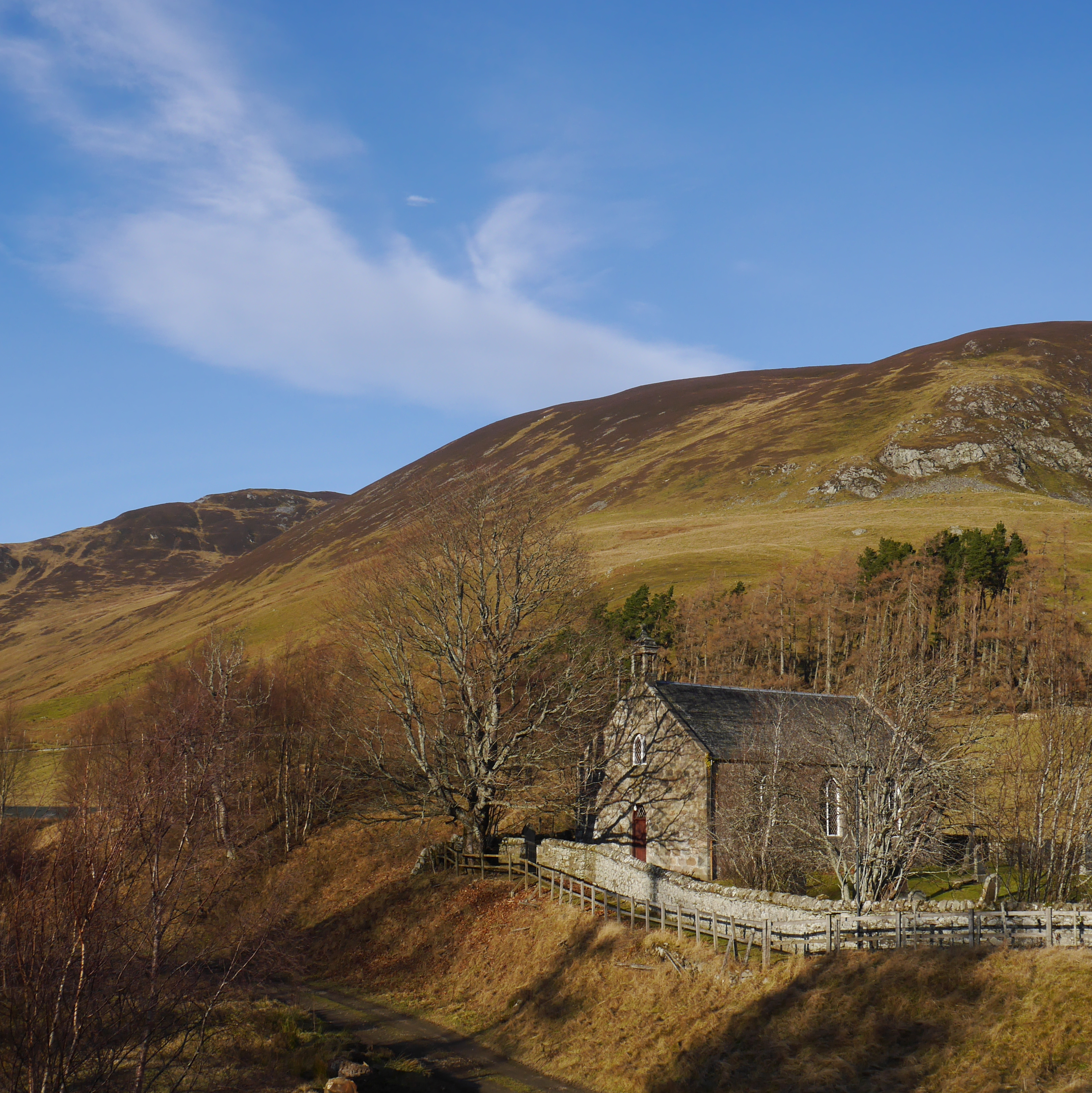
The church at the Spittal of Glenshee

The Spittal of Glenshee (Scottish Gaelic: Spideal Ghlinn Sìdh, pronounced [ˈspitʲəl̪ˠ ʝliːɲ ˈʃiːʝ]) lies at the head of Glenshee in the highlands of eastern Perth and Kinross, Scotland, where the confluence of many small streams flowing south out of the Grampians form the Shee Water. For centuries, there has been a hostel or inn at the site and, in modern times, the small village has become a centre for travel, tourism and winter sports in the region, sited at a bend on the A93 trunk road which leads from Blairgowrie north past the Spittal to the Glenshee Ski Centre and on to Braemar.

Inhabitation in the Neolithic period is indicated by a Megalithic standing stone behind the old kirk, and the Four Poster stone circle on a nearby mound.

When interest in ski mountaineering revived after the First World War and the Scottish Ski Club was resuscitated in 1929, they restarted weekly snow reports with reporters appointed at Lix Toll near Killin, Dalwhinnie, Braemar and the Spittal of Glenshee. The Dundee Ski Club used the Spittal Hotel as its meeting place, and pioneered improvements, setting up the first ski tows in Britain at Glenshee in December 1950. The hotel burnt down in 1959 and was rebuilt in Scandinavian style. However it was once again destroyed by fire in August 2014 and currently the site is for sale.

The village also provides a stopping place on the Cateran Trail waymarked long distance footpath which provides a 64-mile (103 km) circuit in the glens of Perthshire and Angus.

Scotland's folklorist, Hamish Henderson, spent a number of years in the village and developed his interest in Gaelic culture there.
