= Valley of Strathmore =

Valley in Perth and Kinross, Scotland

Coordinates: 56.717°N 3.549°W

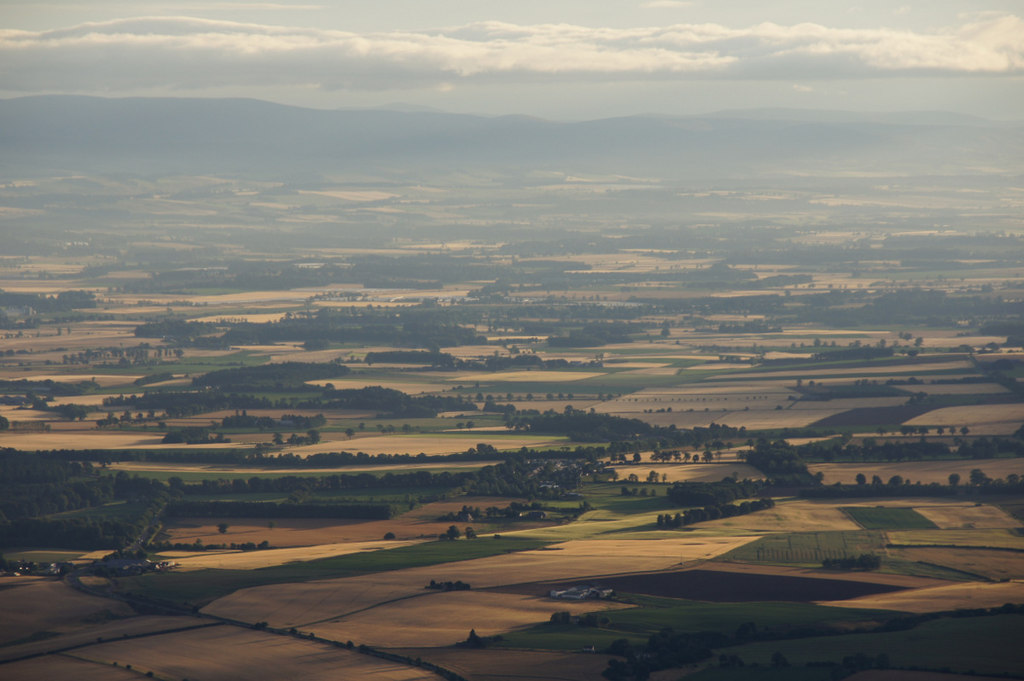
Aerial view of Strathmore

Strathmore (Scottish Gaelic: An Srath Mòr) is a broad valley or strath in east-central Scotland, lying between the Grampian mountains and the Sidlaws. It is approximately 50 mi (80 km) long and 10 mi (16 km) wide. Strathmore is underlain by Old Red Sandstone but this is largely obscured by glacial till, sands and gravels deposited during the ice age. Its northeast to southwest alignment is influenced by the underlying geological structure of the area which reflects the dominant Caledonian trend of both the central lowlands and the Highlands of Scotland; its northern margin reflects the presence of the Highland Boundary Fault. Strathmore is fertile and has some of Scotland's best arable farmland, producing soft fruits and cereals.

== History ==
The Romans established a series of marching camps in Strathmore as they moved northwards through the valley. Other antiquities include Pictish stones such as the Eassie Stone.

The Earl of Strathmore takes his title from the valley, and his seat, Glamis Castle, lies within its bounds.
