= Blairgowrie and Rattray =

Town in Scotland

Coordinates: 56.592°N 3.340°W

Blairgowrie and Rattray: Scottish Gaelic: Blàr Ghobhraidh is Raitear
- Town
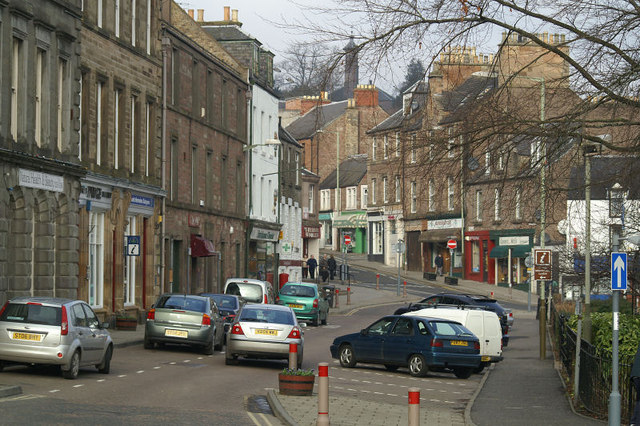
- Blairgowrie town centre

- Location within Perth and Kinross
- Population: 9,433 (2022)
- OS grid reference: NO178452
  - Edinburgh: 44 mi (71 km)
  - London: 375 mi (604 km)
- Council area: Perth and Kinross
- Lieutenancy area: Perth and Kinross
- Country: Scotland
- Sovereign state: United Kingdom
- Post town: BLAIRGOWRIE
- Postcode district: PH10
- Dialling code: 01250
- Police: Scotland
- Fire: Scottish
- Ambulance: Scottish
- UK Parliament: Perth and North Perthshire
- Scottish Parliament: Perthshire North

Blairgowrie and Rattray (/blɛərˈɡaʊri ... ˈrætreɪ/) is a historic market town and twin burgh in Perth and Kinross, Scotland. The town lies on the north side of Strathmore at the foot of the Grampian Mountains. It had a population of 9,433 in 2022.

Locals refer to the town as "Blair". Blairgowrie is the larger of the two former burghs which were united by an Act of Parliament in 1928 and lies on the southwest side of the River Ericht while Rattray is on the northeast side. Rattray claims to be the older and certainly Old Rattray, the area round Rattray Kirk, dates back to the 12th century. New Rattray, the area along the Boat Brae and Balmoral Road dates from 1777 when the River was spanned by the Brig o' Blair. The west boundary is formed by the Knockie, a round grassy hill, and Craighall Gorge on the Ericht. Blairgowrie and Rattray developed over the centuries at the crossroads of several historic routes with links from the town to Perth, Coupar Angus, Alyth and Braemar. The roads to Coupar Angus and Braemar form part of General Wade's military road from Perth to Braemar then onto Fort George. The town's centrepiece is the Wellmeadow, a grassy triangle in the middle of town which hosts regular markets and outdoor entertainment.

== The name ==
The name Blairgowrie means "Plain of Gowrie" in Scottish Gaelic, in which language it is spelt Blàr Ghobharaidh or Blàr Ghobhraidh. The name Rattray is Raitear in Gaelic, and may derive from an English language cognate of Gaelic ràth meaning "fortress" plus a Pictish term cognate with Welsh tref meaning "settlement".

== History ==
=== Early history ===
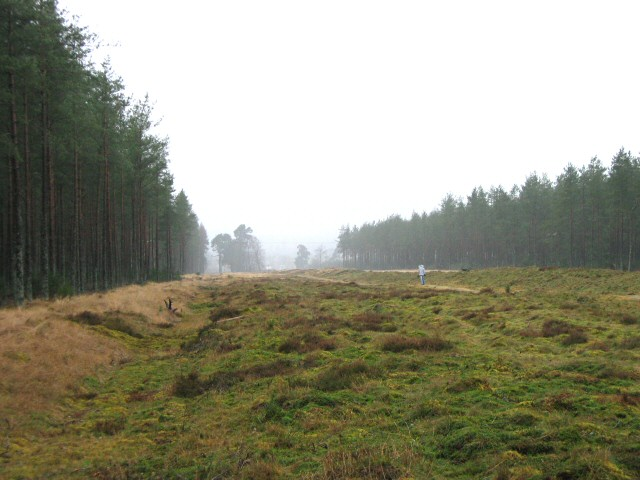
The Cleaven Dyke

The area around Blairgowrie has been occupied continuously since the Neolithic, as evidenced from the Cleaven Dyke, a cursus monument 2 miles (3 kilometres) south-southwest of the town, as well as a Neolithic long mortuary enclosure 4 miles (6 kilometres) west-southwest at Inchtuthil. Several stone circles of this age can also be found in the area, notably the circle bisected by the road at Leys of Marlee, 1 mile (1.5 kilometres) west of Blairgowrie.

Numerous Neolithic and Bronze Age artifacts have been found in the immediate area, including a number of flint arrowheads, spearheads, knives and scrapers found at Carsie, 1/2 mile (800 metres) south of Blairgowrie, and which are now displayed at Perth Museum, and bronze axes, and a bronze sword now in Kelvingrove Museum, Glasgow.

The remains of a Roman legionary fort can be found 4 miles (6 kilometres) west-southwest of Blairgowrie at Inchtuthil, dating from the decade 80-90. Unencumbered by subsequent development, this is considered to be one of the most important archaeological sites in Britain.

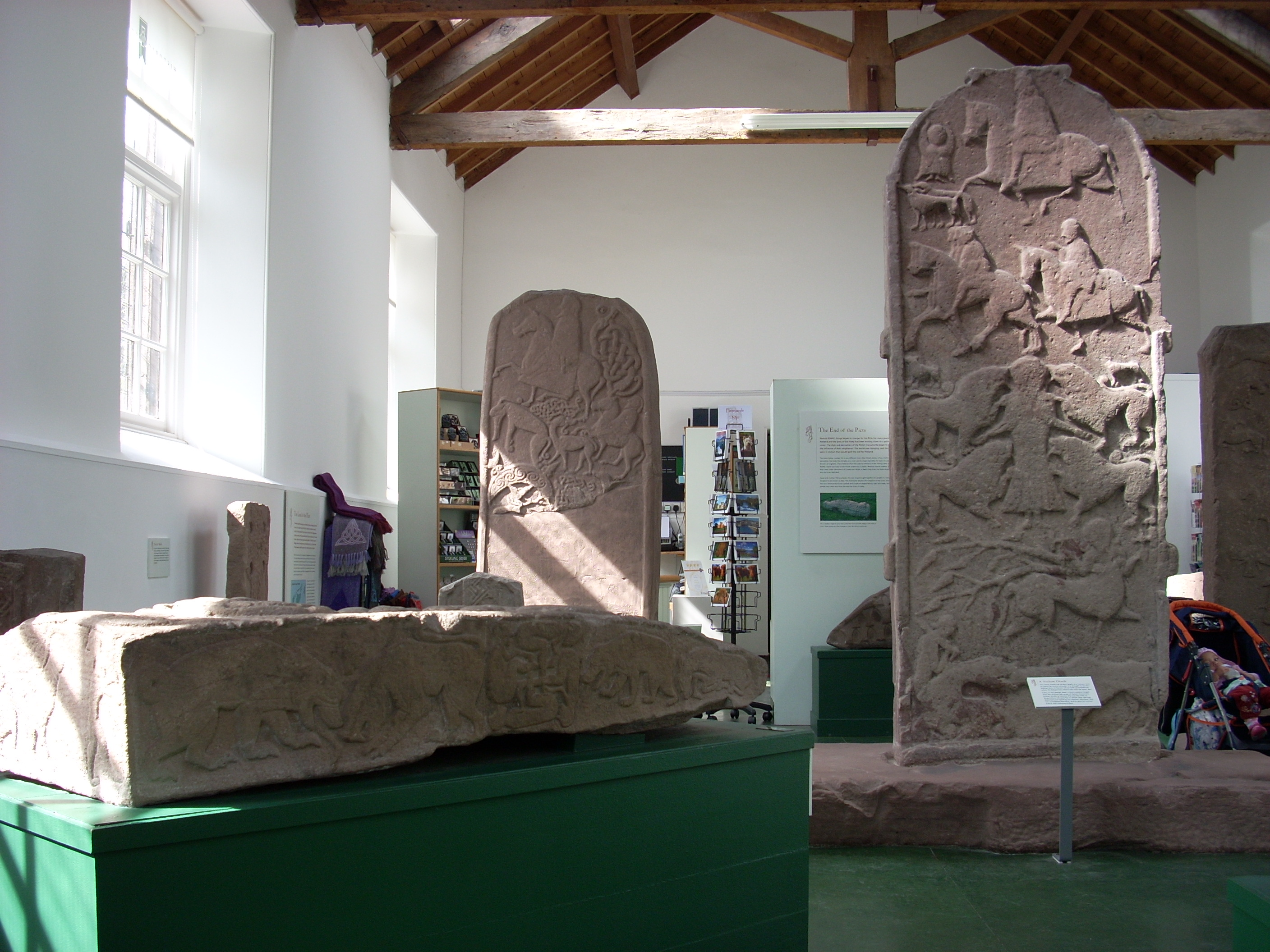
Pictish sculptured stones at Meigle Museum

Pictish remains are in abundance in this part of Scotland and one of the largest collections of Pictish sculptured stones is housed 5 miles (8 kilometres) east of the town at the Meigle Sculptured Stone Museum. The size of the collection, all of which were found in Meigle, suggests this was an ecclesiastical centre of some importance in the 8th to 10th centuries.

=== Modern history ===
From around 1600 to the beginning of the 19th century, Blairgowrie had a fairly stable population, recorded at 425 inhabitants in the first Statistical Account in 1792. The second Statistical Account of 1853 notes a disproportionate increase due to an influx of families attracted by the expanding textiles industry. Gaelic was declining but still partially spoken in the upper part of the parish at that time, with all speaking English.

Blairgowrie was made a barony in favour of George Drummond of Blair in 1634 by a royal charter of Charles I, and became a free burgh in 1809. In 1724 the military road from Coupar Angus to Fort George which passes through the town on the line of the A923 and A93 was completed.

The town expanded hugely in the 19th century thanks to the employment provided by the many textile mills which were built along the River Ericht, all now closed. By 1870 there were 12 mills along the river employing nearly 2,000 men and women and the population had increased from 400 in the 1700s to 4,000. The disused mill buildings can be seen from the riverside walk west from the bridge and from Haugh Road to the east. Keithbank Mill has been converted to apartments.

Soft fruit growing, mainly raspberries and strawberries developed in the 20th century and became a very important part of the town's economy with Smedleys opening a cannery in Haugh Road, Adamsons a jam factory in Croft Lane and huge quantities of table berries and pulp being despatched to markets and jam factories throughout Britain. Berry pickers were brought in by bus from Perth and Dundee, and large encampments were set up on farms for pickers from further afield, mainly from the Glasgow area, who made this their annual holiday. They were joined by the travelling community who congregated here for the berry season. One of the best examples was the Tin City at Essendy, which housed workers in a complex of tin huts with its own chapel, post office, shop, kitchens, etc. The Tin City has gone but now every fruit farm has a caravan site to house the hundreds of Eastern European students who arrive every summer to pick the fruit.

The coming of the railway revolutionised the textile and soft fruit trade. Blairgowrie railway station was the terminus of a branch from Coupar Angus on the Scottish Midland Junction Railway, later part of the Caledonian Railway. The last train ran in the 1960s, and the extensive railway yards are now the site of the Tesco supermarket and Welton Road industrial estate.

Blairgowrie had a busy livestock market at the bottom of the Boat Brae but this closed in the 1960s and is now the site of the Ashgrove Court sheltered housing complex.

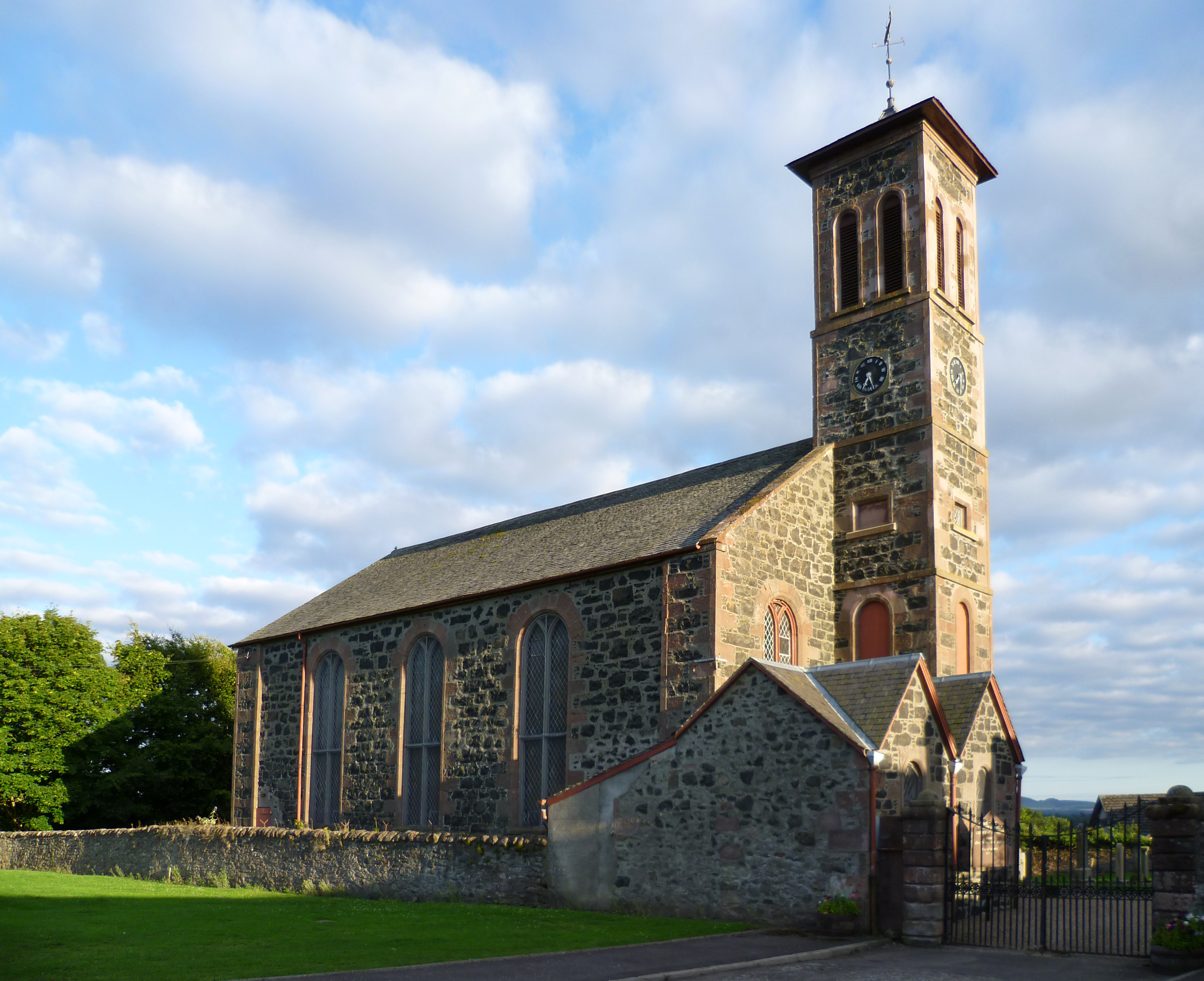
Rattray church

Blairgowrie and Rattray Districts Cottage Hospital opened in May 1901, but its foundation can be traced back to 1882 when the idea for such a hospital was put forward by Mrs. Clerk-Rattray. On her death she bequeathed £25 which was to be given to such an institution if it was ever founded. However attempts over the next few years to raise subscriptions to found the hospital failed. Eventually land for a hospital was gifted by Mrs. Macpherson of Newton Castle and subscriptions were raised to found the hospital. As well as these monetary donations, furnishings for the hospital were provided while the architect Lake Falconer took no fee for his work on the hospital. At the time of opening it had two large wards. It is now known as Blairgowrie Community Hospital. In 2014 a £2.36 million refurbishment project saw the development of a purpose built in-patient GP unit and other new units added to the site.

A short distance upstream from the bridge on the riverside path is Cargill's Leap where Donald Cargill, a minister and covenanter, escaped Government troops by jumping over a narrow part of the River Ericht.

North of Rattray, occupying a dominating position on the edge of Craighall Gorge above the river Ericht, is Craighall Castle, the ancestral home of the chieftain of Clan Rattray. The castle is no longer occupied by a Rattray, having been sold in 2010.

On the west side of Blairgowrie are Newton Castle, home to the chieftain of Clan Macpherson, and Ardblair Castle, home to the Blair Oliphant family.

== Climate ==
Blairgowrie has an oceanic climate (Köppen: Cfb).

Climate data for Blairgowrie (79 m or 259 ft asl, averages 1991–2020)
Month	Jan	Feb	Mar	Apr	May	Jun	Jul	Aug	Sep	Oct	Nov	Dec	Year
Record high °C (°F)	14.4 (57.9)	15.6 (60.1)	22.0 (71.6)	23.1 (73.6)	26.9 (80.4)	30.1 (86.2)	30.0 (86.0)	29.3 (84.7)	26.4 (79.5)	23.2 (73.8)	17.5 (63.5)	14.9 (58.8)	30.1 (86.2)
Mean daily maximum °C (°F)	6.3 (43.3)	7.1 (44.8)	9.1 (48.4)	12.1 (53.8)	15.1 (59.2)	17.8 (64.0)	19.5 (67.1)	18.8 (65.8)	16.3 (61.3)	12.6 (54.7)	8.9 (48.0)	6.4 (43.5)	12.5 (54.5)
Daily mean °C (°F)	3.2 (37.8)	3.9 (39.0)	5.4 (41.7)	7.8 (46.0)	10.5 (50.9)	13.3 (55.9)	15.0 (59.0)	14.6 (58.3)	12.1 (53.8)	9.0 (48.2)	5.7 (42.3)	3.2 (37.8)	8.7 (47.7)
Mean daily minimum °C (°F)	0.2 (32.4)	0.6 (33.1)	1.6 (34.9)	3.6 (38.5)	5.8 (42.4)	8.7 (47.7)	10.6 (51.1)	10.4 (50.7)	7.9 (46.2)	5.4 (41.7)	2.5 (36.5)	−0.1 (31.8)	4.8 (40.6)
Record low °C (°F)	−17.6 (0.3)	−15.7 (3.7)	−13.3 (8.1)	−6.0 (21.2)	−2.8 (27.0)	−1.2 (29.8)	1.3 (34.3)	1.8 (35.2)	−2.0 (28.4)	−6.6 (20.1)	−11.8 (10.8)	−16.8 (1.8)	−17.6 (0.3)
Average precipitation mm (inches)	83.4 (3.28)	59.4 (2.34)	56.1 (2.21)	48.8 (1.92)	59.0 (2.32)	61.6 (2.43)	82.5 (3.25)	86.6 (3.41)	64.0 (2.52)	87.0 (3.43)	78.9 (3.11)	80.3 (3.16)	847.5 (33.37)
Mean monthly sunshine hours	52.4	77.4	117.5	166.3	188.7	154.7	157.2	149.4	120.3	87.8	64.2	34.9	1,370.6
Source 1: Met Office
Source 2: Starlings Roost Weather

== Economy ==
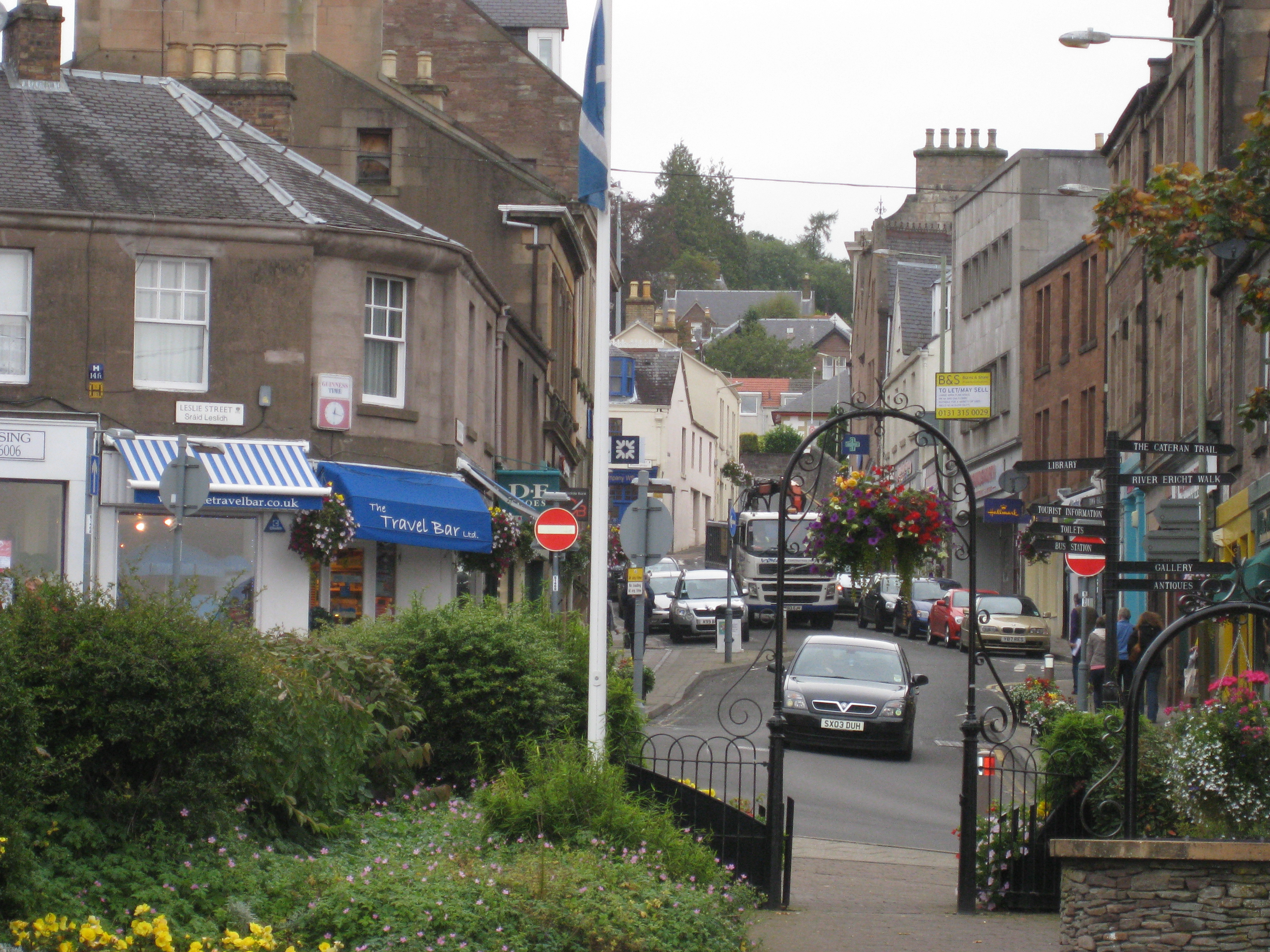
Entrance to Wellmeadow

The surrounding area is still the soft fruit centre of Scotland, and the local population increases greatly in summer when the Eastern European students arrive to harvest the fruit which traditionally consisted of raspberries and strawberries but now includes a wider range with cherries, blackberries, blueberries, gooseberries etc. The extensive use of poly tunnels and raised beds has greatly extended the growing season with fruit available from May until October.

Other major industries include Castle Water, Proctor Insulation, Tayside Contracts, Graham Environmental, Davidsons chemist headquarters and various fruit processing and freezing plants. The industrial estate on Welton Road houses many small businesses.

The town has two main motor dealerships and several independent garages.

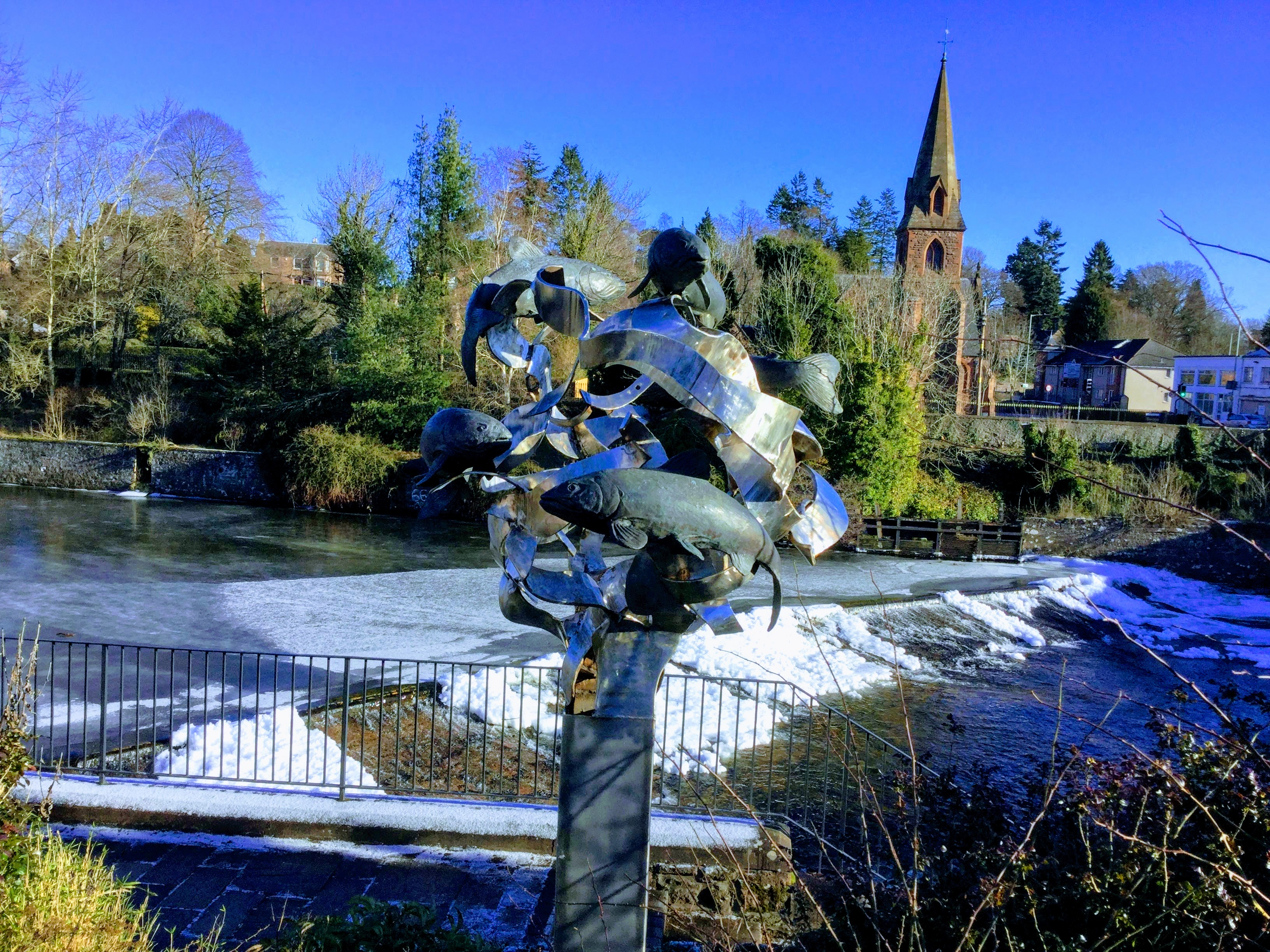
River Ericht

The local weekly newspaper is the Blairgowrie Advertiser, locally known as "the Blairie", which is now produced and printed in Perth by Trinity Mirror Group. The Blairie has a long history and was originally produced and printed in the old printworks in Reform Street where the original print machines are still mothballed.

There are regular Saturday outdoor markets in the Wellmeadow with stalls offering local produce and crafts.

Blairgowrie's town centre has a range of independent shops, craft workshops, restaurants and pubs. National retailers include Tesco, Sainsbury's, Co-op and Boots. The Angus Hotel and Royal Hotel cater for local customers, tourists and a large number of bus parties who use the town as a touring base.

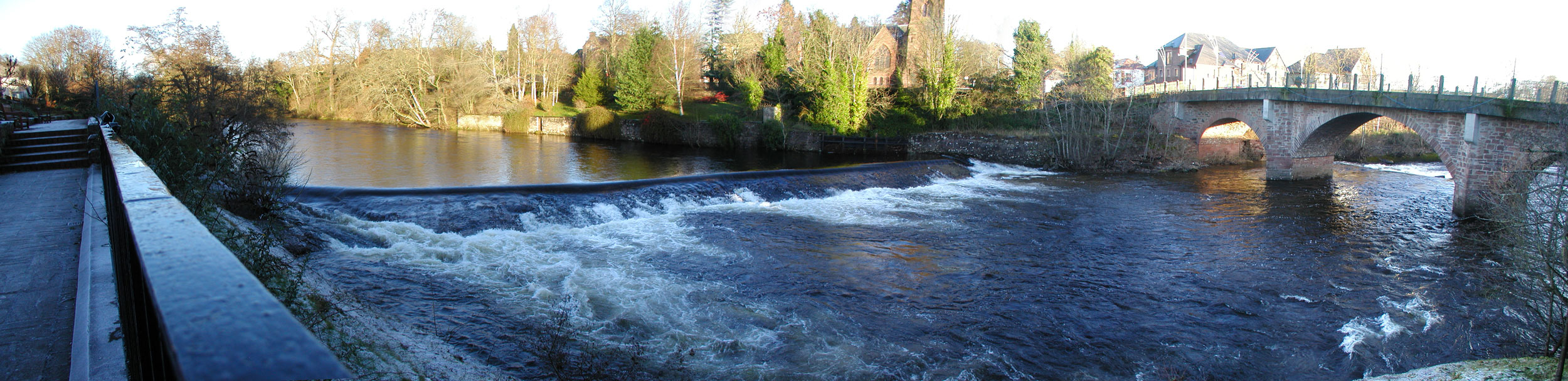
Bridge over the River Ericht, joining Blairgowrie and Rattray

== Education ==
The new Blairgowrie Campus opened in Elm Drive in 2009 incorporating Newhill Primary and St Stephens RC Primary. Newhill Primary holds about 360 children, while St Stephen's RC Primary is a smaller unit, holding 78 pupils as of the 2024 census. Rattray Primary serves children on that side of the river. Blairgowrie High School in Beeches Road provides secondary education for all round the area. The adjacent Recreation Centre has a pool and leisure facilities and is scheduled for replacement in the near future. The disused former Hill Primary School was the subject of a controversial but ultimately unsuccessful attempt by The Ericht Trust to provide a community centre but it has now been sold for conversion to housing as has the former St Stephen's RC primary school in John Street.

== Public transport ==
Stagecoach provide all the bus services to and from Blairgowrie with routes to Perth, Dundee, Alyth, Coupar Angus, Dunkeld, Aberfeldy, Kirkmichael and Glenshee as well as a circular town service. The nearest railway stations are Perth and Dunkeld & Birnam and the nearest airport is Dundee. Services to Perth and Dundee are frequent. The bus station is located in the Wellmeadow.

== Churches ==
Churches represented are Church of Scotland (Blairgowrie and Rattray Parish Churches), St Stephen's RC, St Catherine's Episcopalian, Evangelical Church, Jehovah's Witnesses, Church on the Way, Lifeplus Church, Methodist Church and Plymouth Brethren.

== Culture ==
In 1996, Blairgowrie hosted the Royal National Mòd, a festival of the Scottish Gaelic language. Since then the town has featured bilingual street signs, in English and Gaelic.

== Notable people ==
- David Laird Adams (1837–1892) theologian
- Nora Calderwood (1896–1985), mathematician, born in Blairgowrie
- Donald Cargill (1619–1681), covenanter, born in Rattray
- Andy Clyde (1892–1967), actor
- Jake Findlay (born 1954), professional footballer, most notably for Luton Town, born in Blairgowrie
- Alan Gifford (1911–1989), American-born film and television actor, died in Blairgowrie
- Hamish Henderson (1919–2002), poet, folk singer, and activist, born in Blairgowrie
- Sir William Alan Macpherson of Cluny (1926–2021), British High Court judge, and the 27th hereditary chief of Clan Macpherson, born in Blairgowrie
- Gavin Pyper (born 1979), racing driver, born in Blairgowrie
- Professor Robert Alexander Robertson (1873–1935), botanist, born in Rattray
- Lieutenant Colonel Alexander Dron Stewart (1883–1969), born in Blairgowrie
- Sheila Stewart (1937–2014), Scottish traditional singer, storyteller and author, born in Blairgowrie

== Sport ==
Football

Blairgowrie and Rattray is home to the Scottish Junior Football East Region Premier League side Blairgowrie F.C. as well as the Scottish Amateur Football Association sides Rattray A.F.C. and Balmoral United A.F.C. which play in the Perthshire Amateur League.

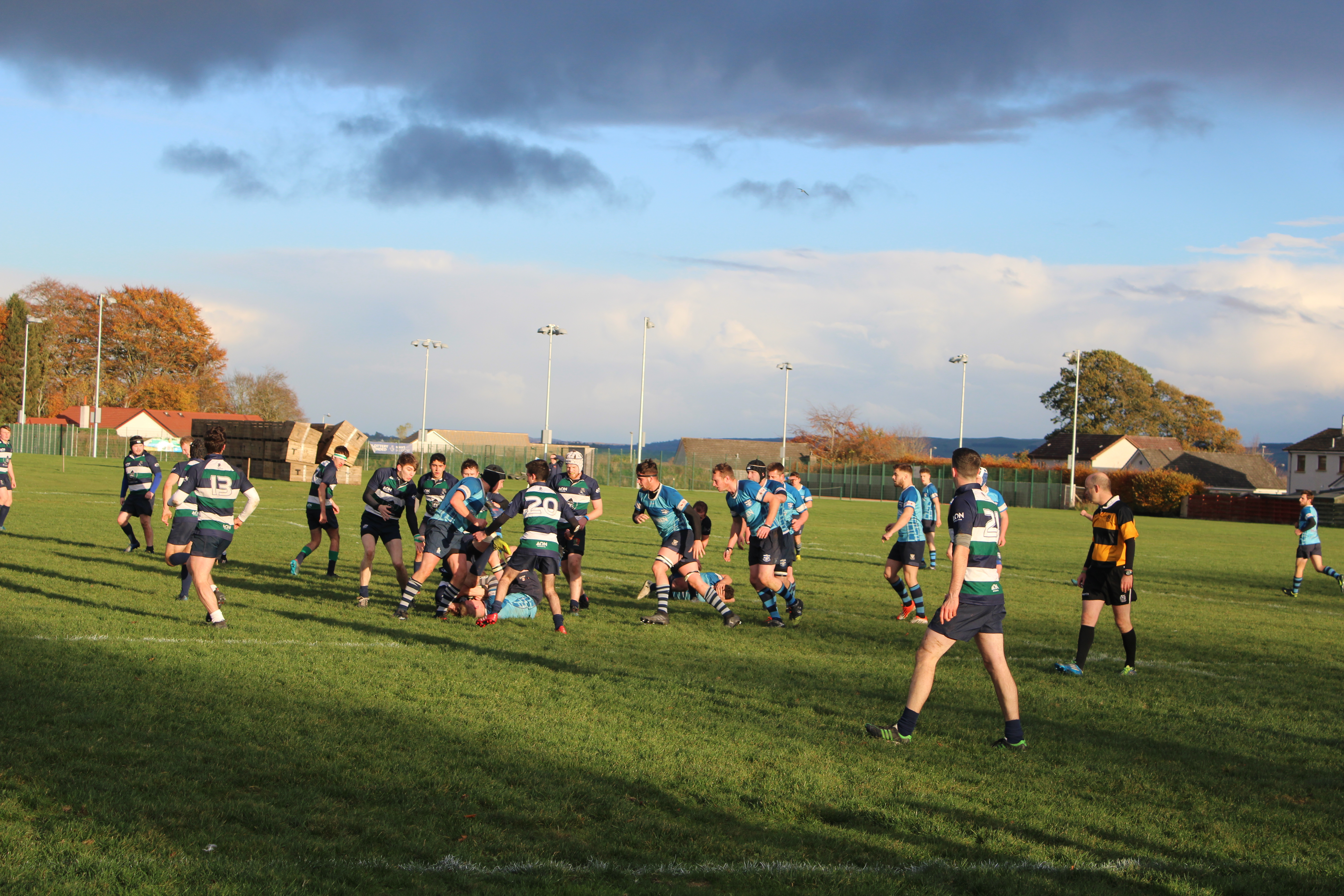
Blairgowrie RFC (in light blue), playing at the JJ Coupar Recreational Park, October 2018

Rugby

Blairgowrie Rugby Club was founded in 1980 (originally as Blairgowrie High School FP RFC) and as of 2019, plays in the Caledonia Regional League Caledonia League 1. The team is based within the John Johnston Coupar Recreational Park on Coupar Angus Road, which formed part of an old berry farm which was bequeathed to the town in the 1970s for use as a sports and recreational facility.

Golf

Blairgowrie Golf Club was founded in 1889. There are now two 18-hole courses, Rosemount and Lansdowne, and a 9-hole course.

Skiing

The Glenshee Ski Centre in Glenshee (Scottish Gaelic: Gleann Sith, "Glen of the Fairies"), is some 18 miles (29 kilometres) north at the Cairnwell Pass on the A93 Braemar road, which is the highest public road in the UK.

Hillwalking

Blairgowrie is normally considered the start and finish of the marked 64-mile (103-kilometre) Cateran Trail long-distance walk which follows a circular route through Glenericht and Strathardle to Bridge of Cally, Kirkmichael and Enochdhu, over Ben Earb to Spittal of Glenshee, through Glenshee and Glenisla to Kirkton of Glenisla and Alyth and finally back to Blairgowrie. The trail is divided into five stages and can easily be walked in five days or less, although winning teams in the annual "Cateran Yomp" regularly complete it in under eleven hours.

Rattray

The traditional ball game of Rattray no longer takes place, but the Rattray silver ball, the trophy retained by the winners, is still in existence. It is believed to have been donated by Sylvester Rattray of Nether Persie who became minister of Rattray in 1591 and continued there until his death in 1623. The Rattray silver ball is now kept at Perth Museum.

Highland Games

Blairgowrie Highland Games are held annually on the first Sunday of September in Bogles Field on Essendy Road. It is noted for its Hill Race and its mass tug o'war where as many contestants as possible from Blairgowrie and Rattray compete against each other.

The evening before is known as Braemar Night with entertainment in the Wellmeadow and fireworks along the river. This tradition started in the 1960s to encourage travellers returning from the Braemar Highland Games (then held on a Thursday), which attracted huge numbers of visitors due to the attendance of the Royal Family, to stop in the town and quickly grew into a huge programme of entertainments, pipe bands, fireworks, funfairs etc., drawing tens of thousands not only returning south from Braemar but on special excursions from Perth and Dundee.

When Blairgowrie Games restarted in the 1980s, the Braemar Games had moved to the first Saturday in September, and the following day seemed an appropriate date for Blair Games. Braemar Night has evolved into a more refined smaller all-day event aimed at locals but is still extremely popular. The main feature and finale is a spectacular firework display along the River Ericht which draws large crowds onto the bridge, which is temporarily closed, and along the riverside areas.

=== Snow Road ===
Blairgowrie is the southern point of the Cairngorm National Park Snow Road tourist route which runs through Glenshee, Braemar, Ballater and Tomintoul to its northern end at Grantown-on-Spey. The route includes the highest point on the UK road system at the Cairnwell Pass and the Cockbridge to Tomintoul road over the Lecht Pass which is well known on winter road reports as one of the first to be closed by snow.

== Twin towns ==
Blairgowrie and Rattray is twinned with:

- Pleasanton, California, United States
- Cowansville, Quebec, Canada
- Fergus, Ontario, Canada
- Brebières, Pas-de-Calais, Hauts-de-France, France

== Namesakes ==
Blairgowrie, a seaside town south of Melbourne, Victoria, Australia, and Blairgowrie, a suburb of Johannesburg, South Africa, were named after the town.
