= George and Lachlan Rattray =

Scottish men accused of witchcraft

George and Lachlan Rattray (fl. 1698–1745) of Kirkmichael, Perthshire were two Scottish men accused of witchcraft in 1704. They were sentenced to death in 1706, but thanks to the intervention of Lord Forglen, this was postponed twice, and finally commuted to banishment. Lachlan went to Flanders where he fought with the Cameronian Regiment in the War of the Spanish Succession until the Peace of Utrecht in 1713. He then returned to Scotland where he was made adjutant of the volunteer force defending Edinburgh during the Jacobite rising of 1715, and went on to become a burgess of the city.

== Background ==
Lachlan was born in the late seventeenth century, the son of Alexander Rattray, whose father David was the son of Alexander Rattray, laird of Dalrulzion in 1620. Lachlan was born and brought up at Dalnagairn, near Kirkmichael, Perthshire, which his mother had inherited from her first marriage through jointure. He appears to have been sent away to school, which he attended with his cousin Alexander Rattray of Tullochcurran. When he returned home, he became very close friends with David Spalding of Ashintully Castle. Local historian Charles Fergusson says "Growing up together from infancy, it was only natural that Lachlan and Ashintully's two sons—David, the heir, and Andrew, afterwards 1st of Glenkilry—should become great friends, especially as they were all stalwart, athletic young fellows, equally at home in the ballroom or on the battlefield." Lachlan wrote that he and David "fell so intimate one with the other that there was no separation of us till the devil came in the ploy, which ye shall hear after. And who was like us both then for strength and manhood."

According to Lachlan, his cousin Alexander "had at that time the lands of Inverchroskie, and also on that hill Minnoch and Bardsallacage, which had not been laboured since the flood", and due to their connection "he would give me a good pennyworth of that place called Bardsallachage in that glen. So that I took a tack of it, and built houses on it, and bigged dykes round it, near to the Mill of Leiuth, which is to be seen to this day. I also took Minnoch on the other side of the Moss, and built a good house in Minnoch with a chimney in it, and a good new kiln in it, and to tell the truth I was very well there for several years, and cousin Sanders (Alexander) and I agreed very well. He was very kind to me, and I did him several times very good service". Alexander was neighbours with Donal Mor M'Coull, and according to Fergusson "All the M'Coulls lived on bad terms with their neighbours, but Donal Mor was the last and worst." M'Coull once sent some Badenoch men to steal Alexander's cattle, taking eighteen of them. Lachlan travelled to Badenoch, and lived there for a month, learning who the thieves were and who had sent them, before returning to Alexander, who convened the Badenoch gentry, and was awarded twenty-one cattle to make up for the theft.

In late 1697 John Murray, 1st Marquess of Atholl sent troops to Inverness-shire to protect his daughter Amelia from Simon Fraser, 11th Lord Lovat, including two companies from Strathardle which set off in early 1698. One of these companies, consisting of eighty Spalding men, was led by David Spalding, with Lachlan, his cousin Alexander Rattray, and William Farquharson as officers. However, Fraser fled to the highlands, and "the most tempestuous weather of snow and great frosts" prevented Murray's men from finding him. All they could do was destroy the Frasers' property, and forcibly take many of Fraser's men as witnesses to testify against him; the company was disbanded after Candlemas that year.

Lachlan went on to suffer from a series of bad harvests; writing that one year "our corn being covered so long with frost and snow before it was filled, was entirely lost. I got no corn but what I pulled out of the snow with my hands, nor none in that glen, and in all the country a very bad, ill-filled crop, and famine, lasted six or seven years, that put many to the door that was in former times well to live." As a result, he moved to the farm of Alrick in Glenisla. He had maintained his friendship with David Spalding, who according to Lachlan "still continued in his folly, but by this time my marriage, and the loss of my crop, and having a wife and four children to keep, made me some soberer".

== Witchcraft accusation and trial ==
According to Lachlan, David Spalding visited him at Alrick, saying that "he was betwitched by witches", and wanted Lachlan to intercede with them to release him. Lachlan refused, wanting nothing to do with this, and so Spalding falsely accused Lachlan of witchcraft to his father and uncle. They immediately went to Edinburgh where they were granted a commission by the Privy Council on 18 December 1704 with Lachlan and one George Rattray being "alleged guilty of the horrid crimes of mischievous charms, by witchcraft and malefice, sorcery or necromancy". The commission allowed them to apprehend Lachlan and George so that they could be tried, so the Spaldings sent a strong group of men to Alrick, who took Lachlan to Ashintully Castle where he was kept in the dungeon for two days.

Rather than sending Lachlan to nearby Perth, where he may have had friends, the Spaldings took him to Inverness, where Fergusson says "young Spalding's uncle, Mackintosh of Mackintosh, then reigned supreme, and where they were sure of a conviction". Lachlan describes how "After being two days under a strong guard in Ashintully Castle, the morrow before day they called for a power of men, bound my two hands behind my back, and they had a long piece of rope that tied me behind, and two men did hold a grip of me behind, till we reached Inverness. There they carried me into a change house (inn) where was one Mr John Mackintosh, an agent new come from Edinburgh, and he was appointed to examine me, and give me a terror." Despite being advised to plead guilty, Lachlan refused, and so was imprisoned in the Town Steeple where he was given two pence a day for food; according to Fergusson he had "Plenty fresh air on the top of the steeple to give him a good appetite, but two pence was but a small sum to satisfy that appetite." When Lord Forglen—a distant relative of Lachlan's—heard of his conditions, he wrote to Inverness provost William Duff (father of William Duff, 1st Earl Fife), after which Lachlan says "I was taken good care of, and my room in prison cleaned, and a good bedding and clothes sent to me, and after that the best in town was very kind to me all my time".

Despite the Privy Council commission saying that a verdict must be reported to them by 22 March 1705, Lachlan remained imprisoned until his and George's trial on 25 June 1706. Lachlan wrote "when the time of my trial was come, the head of our family—George Rattray of Dalrillion—and Lachlan M'Pherson in Dalmongie, who was married to my cousin Dalmongie's sister, both came from Edinburgh with advices what to do at the trial." The commissioners for this case were Alexander Grant, David Polson, Hugh Rose, William Duff, Simon MacKenzie, "Baillie, commissary of Inverness", and John Forbes. Lachlan claimed that "he that sat high judge on me was the Laird of Grant, who was hired by the Spalding party to take my life, and would not allow an Inverness Proctor to plead for me, so that Dalrillion was obliged to go to Elgin to hire Procters there". According to Fergusson "The Spaldings, several of their servants, and, of course, the minister of the parish of Kirkmichael, Mr John Pearson, who was married to young David Spalding's sister, all appeared as witnesses against Lachlan. His proctors tried to speak for him, but Judge Grant would not allow them, so he was condemned to death unheard."

The strict terms of the Privy Council's commission required the commissioners to send their judgement back to the Privy Council for consideration, and not to carry out the sentence without receiving a warrant from the Council to do so. A committee of the Council—consisting of James Graham, David Erskine, David Carnegie, Archibald Douglas, Alexander Murray, James Stewart, Gilbert Elliot, and Alexander Douglas, presided over by James Sandilands—considered the verdict on 16 July 1706, and sentenced Lachlan and George to death, to be carried out by the magistrates of Inverness on the last Wednesday of September. However, Lord Forglen—who was then one of the Lords of Session—intervened, and, supported by his cousins lairds Dalrillion and Dalmunzie, used his influence and with a great deal of effort managed to get the executions reprieved by the Privy Council, initially until November 1706, and then until the last Friday of January 1707, before the sentences were finally commuted to banishment on 28 December 1706.

== Banishment and later life ==
Lord Forglen arranged for Lachlan to go abroad with and serve as a sergeant under his son, Captain Alexander Ogilvy. As Lachlan said "if I should stay at home, I was so proud and foolish that it would be very ready of them, out of revenge, or they kill me [sic]". They went to Flanders and joined Colonel George Preston's Cameronian Regiment, fighting in the War of the Spanish Succession.

Some time before the end of the war, it came to be Lachlan and Ogilvy's turn to return to Edinburgh to recruit more troops for the regiment. They initially stayed with Lord Forglen, but Lachlan's smoking disturbed Forglen's wife, causing Forglen to joke with her "My dear, how could you suffer the smell of powder in the day of battle?" Not wanting to bother her, Lachlan took a room at Blackfriars Wynd, where he was joined by Forglen's youngest son James. The landlady, "a well-to-do widow, who had a well furnished house and kept lodgers" called Helen Hay (née Williamson), was very kind to them both, and after about a month James tried to get his father to marry her to Lachlan, as there were signs that the war was about to end. Instead, the fighting flared up again, and Lachlan and Ogilvy returned to the continent with their recruits, where they remained until the Peace of Utrecht in 1713.

On his way back to Scotland, Lachlan was quite seriously ill (saying "I am not well with the ague, and bareheaded I cannot be, and stand too long I am not able"), but met the Jacobite James Radclyffe, 3rd Earl of Derwentwater and his brother Charles in Newcastle. Radclyffe told him a story that the Scottish Rattrays were descended from his family, and kept Lachlan for three weeks. Perhaps recognising Lachlan's military experience, Radclyffe tried to convince him to remain under his employ for the rest of his life, once he had returned to Scotland to visit his father and friends.

However, when he reached Edinburgh, Lord Forglen, who was a Whig, and opponent of the Jacobites, would not hear of this, and instead promised to find him work in Edinburgh. In the meantime, he had made thorough enquiries about Lachlan's former landlady Helen Hay, telling Lachlan "I have caused search her out gif she was in anything of debt, and find there is no danger in it; but only two weak children that is not likely to live long [sic]". As Fergusson says "Whether his Lordship thought the latter item of information would further encourage Lachlan or not, I know not; but he married Mrs Hay" on 11 December 1713, in what was his third marriage.

During the Jacobite rising of 1715, Forglen recommended Lachlan to the Provost and Council of Edinburgh to train the volunteers that were being raised to defend the city. As a result, he was made adjutant of the four hundred strong force.

Records show that Lachlan had become a burgess of Edinburgh by 19 May 1728, when his servant Elizabeth Williamson married John Balmain. His wife Helen died in 1743, and he remarried on 2 June 1745, this time to Margaret Lyon, daughter of the late Alexander Lyon, a farmer in Glamis.
