= List of United Kingdom locations: Cra =

The United Kingdom

This is part of the list of United Kingdom locations: a gazetteer of place names in the United Kingdom showing each place's locality and geographical coordinates.

== Cra ==
Location	Locality	Coordinates (links to map & photo sources)	OS grid reference
Crabbet Park	West Sussex	51.11°N 00.14°W	TQ3037
Crabble	Kent	51.14°N 01.27°E	TR2943
Crabbs Cross	Worcestershire	52.27°N 01.95°W	SP0364
Crabbs Green	Hertfordshire	51.93°N 00.10°E	TL4528
Crabgate	Norfolk	52.80°N 01.09°E	TG0927
Crab Orchard	Dorset	50.85°N 01.88°W	SU0806
Crabtree	Devon	50.38°N 04.09°W	SX5156
Crabtree	West Sussex	51.01°N 00.26°W	TQ2225
Crabtree Green	Wrexham	52.98°N 02.99°W	SJ3344
Crackenedge	Kirklees	53.69°N 01.63°W	SE2422
Crackenthorpe	Cumbria	54.59°N 02.52°W	NY6622
Crackington Haven	Cornwall	50.73°N 04.63°W	SX1496
Crackley	Warwickshire	52.35°N 01.57°W	SP2973
Crackley	Staffordshire	53.04°N 02.25°W	SJ8350
Crackleybank	Shropshire	52.68°N 02.37°W	SJ7510
Crackpot	North Yorkshire	54.35°N 02.04°W	SD9796
Crackthorn Corner	Suffolk	52.36°N 00.98°E	TM0378
Cracoe	North Yorkshire	54.03°N 02.04°W	SD9760
Cracow Moss	Staffordshire	53.02°N 02.37°W	SJ7547
Craddock	Devon	50.90°N 03.30°W	ST0812
Cradle Edge	Bradford	53.83°N 01.91°W	SE0638
Cradle End	Hertfordshire	51.86°N 00.10°E	TL4521
Cradley	Dudley	52.45°N 02.08°W	SO9484
Cradley	Herefordshire	52.12°N 02.39°W	SO7347
Cradley Heath	Dudley	52.46°N 02.08°W	SO9485
Cradoc	Powys	51.95°N 03.44°W	SO0130
Crafthole	Cornwall	50.36°N 04.30°W	SX3654
Crafton	Buckinghamshire	51.86°N 00.72°W	SP8819
Crag Bank	Lancashire	54.12°N 02.78°W	SD4970
Crag Foot	Lancashire	54.15°N 02.79°W	SD4873
Cragganmore	Moray	57.40°N 03.39°W	NJ1636
Cragg Hill	Leeds	53.82°N 01.63°W	SE2437
Craggie Cat	Aberdeenshire	57.01°N 02.26°W	NO8492
Cragg Vale	Calderdale	53.70°N 02.00°W	SE0023
Craghead	Durham	54.84°N 01.67°W	NZ2150
Crahan	Cornwall	50.12°N 05.24°W	SW6830
Crai	Powys	51.90°N 03.61°W	SN8924
Craichie	Angus	56.61°N 02.81°W	NO5047
Craig	Highland	57.48°N 05.28°W	NH0349
Craig Berthlwyd	Merthyr Tydfil	51.65°N 03.31°W	ST0996
Craig-cefn-parc	Swansea	51.70°N 03.92°W	SN6702
Craigdam	Aberdeenshire	57.36°N 02.26°W	NJ8430
Craigdarroch	Highland	57.57°N 04.61°W	NH4457
Craig Douglas	Scottish Borders	55.50°N 03.12°W	NT2924
Craigearn	Aberdeenshire	57.21°N 02.46°W	NJ7214
Craigellachie	Moray	57.48°N 03.20°W	NJ2844
Craigend	Scottish Borders	55.69°N 02.87°W	NT4545
Craigend	City of Glasgow	55.86°N 04.15°W	NS6566
Craigend	Stirling	56.06°N 03.96°W	NS7887
Craigend	Angus	56.54°N 02.68°W	NO5839
Craigendoran	Argyll and Bute	55.99°N 04.71°W	NS3181
Craigends	Renfrewshire	55.86°N 04.54°W	NS4166
Craigenhouses	Argyll and Bute	55.83°N 05.96°W	NR5267
Craigens	East Ayrshire	55.43°N 04.24°W	NS5818
Craigentinny	City of Edinburgh	55.95°N 03.13°W	NT2974
Craigerne	Scottish Borders	55.63°N 03.19°W	NT2539
Craighat	Stirling	56.02°N 04.42°W	NS4984
Craighead	Aberdeenshire	57.44°N 02.85°W	NJ4940
Craighouse	Argyll and Bute	55.83°N 05.96°W	NR5267
Craigie	City of Dundee	56.46°N 02.94°W	NO4231
Craigie (Blairgowrie)	Perth and Kinross	56.57°N 03.45°W	NO1143
Craigie (Perth)	Perth and Kinross	56.38°N 03.44°W	NO1122
Craigie (Ayr)	South Ayrshire	55.45°N 04.62°W	NS3421
Craigie (near Kilmarnock)	South Ayrshire	55.55°N 04.50°W	NS4232
Craigiebuckler	City of Aberdeen	57.13°N 02.16°W	NJ9005
Craigiehall	City of Edinburgh	55.96°N 03.34°W	NT1675
Craigielaw	East Lothian	56.00°N 02.88°W	NT4579
Craigierig	Scottish Borders	55.49°N 03.26°W	NT2023
Craigleith	City of Edinburgh	55.95°N 03.23°W	NT2374
Craig Llangiwg	Neath Port Talbot	51.72°N 03.85°W	SN7205
Craig-llwyn	Shropshire	52.83°N 03.14°W	SJ2327
Craiglockhart	City of Edinburgh	55.91°N 03.24°W	NT2270
Craigmaud	Aberdeenshire	57.61°N 02.20°W	NJ8858
Craigmill	Stirling	56.13°N 03.91°W	NS8195
Craigmill	Angus	56.50°N 02.70°W	NO5735
Craigmillar	City of Edinburgh	55.92°N 03.15°W	NT2871
Craigmore	Argyll and Bute	55.84°N 05.03°W	NS1065
Craignant	Wrexham	52.90°N 03.11°W	SJ2535
Craigneuk (Wishaw)	North Lanarkshire	55.78°N 03.97°W	NS7756
Craigneuk (Airdrie)	North Lanarkshire	55.86°N 03.95°W	NS7865
Craignish Point	Argyll and Bute	56.13°N 05.60°W	NR764992
Craignure	Argyll and Bute	56.46°N 05.71°W	NM7136
Craigo	Angus	56.76°N 02.52°W	NO6864
Craigrory	Highland	57.50°N 04.30°W	NH6248
Craigrothie	Fife	56.27°N 03.01°W	NO3710
Craig's End	Essex	52.00°N 00.49°E	TL7137
Craigsford Mains	Scottish Borders	55.63°N 02.70°W	NT5638
Craigshill	West Lothian	55.88°N 03.50°W	NT0667
Craigside	Durham	54.71°N 01.81°W	NZ1235
Craigston (Baile na Creige)	Western Isles	56.97°N 07.50°W	NF6601
Craigton	Highland	57.50°N 04.23°W	NH6648
Craigton	City of Glasgow	55.84°N 04.33°W	NS5464
Craigton (near Carnoustie)	Angus	56.53°N 02.79°W	NO5138
Craigton (Craigton of Airlie)	Angus	56.63°N 03.11°W	NO3250
Craig-y-don	Conwy	53.31°N 03.81°W	SH7981
Craig-y-Duke	Swansea	51.70°N 03.88°W	SN7002
Craig-y-penrhyn	Ceredigion	52.50°N 03.99°W	SN6592
Craig-y-Rhacca	Caerphilly	51.59°N 03.17°W	ST1989
Craik	Scottish Borders	55.36°N 03.04°W	NT3408
Crail	Fife	56.25°N 02.63°W	NO6107
Crailing	Scottish Borders	55.50°N 02.50°W	NT6824
Crailinghall	Scottish Borders	55.49°N 02.49°W	NT6922
Crakehill	North Yorkshire	54.15°N 01.35°W	SE4273
Crakemarsh	Staffordshire	52.92°N 01.86°W	SK0936
Crambe	North Yorkshire	54.06°N 00.88°W	SE7364
Crambeck	North Yorkshire	54.09°N 00.88°W	SE7367
Cramhurst	Surrey	51.15°N 00.65°W	SU9440
Cramlington	Northumberland	55.07°N 01.59°W	NZ2676
Cramond	City of Edinburgh	55.97°N 03.31°W	NT1876
Cramond Bridge	City of Edinburgh	55.96°N 03.33°W	NT1775
Crampmoor	Hampshire	50.99°N 01.45°W	SU3822
Cranage	Cheshire	53.20°N 02.37°W	SJ7568
Cranberry	Staffordshire	52.91°N 02.26°W	SJ8235
Cranborne	Dorset	50.91°N 01.93°W	SU0513
Cranbourne	Hampshire	51.24°N 01.09°W	SU6350
Cranbourne	Berkshire	51.43°N 00.67°W	SU9272
Cranbrook	Kent	51.09°N 00.52°E	TQ7736
Cranbrook	Redbridge	51.56°N 00.04°E	TQ4287
Cranbrook Common	Kent	51.11°N 00.54°E	TQ7838
Crane Moor	Barnsley	53.50°N 01.54°W	SE3001
Crane's Corner	Norfolk	52.68°N 00.82°E	TF9113
Cranfield	Bedfordshire	52.06°N 00.61°W	SP9542
Cranford	Devon	50.96°N 04.36°W	SS3421
Cranford	Hillingdon	51.47°N 00.41°W	TQ1076
Cranford St Andrew	Northamptonshire	52.38°N 00.64°W	SP9277
Cranford St John	Northamptonshire	52.37°N 00.64°W	SP9276
Cranham	Gloucestershire	51.80°N 02.16°W	SO8912
Cranham	Havering	51.56°N 00.26°E	TQ5787
Cranhill	Warwickshire	52.17°N 01.82°W	SP1253
Cranhill	City of Glasgow	55.85°N 04.17°W	NS6465
Crank	St Helens	53.48°N 02.75°W	SJ5099
Crankwood	Wigan	53.49°N 02.57°W	SD6200
Cranleigh	Surrey	51.13°N 00.48°W	TQ0638
Cranley	Suffolk	52.30°N 01.15°E	TM1572
Cranley Gardens	Haringey	51.58°N 00.15°W	TQ2889
Cranloch	Moray	57.60°N 03.20°W	NJ2858
Cranmer Green	Suffolk	52.30°N 00.94°E	TM0171
Cranmore	Somerset	51.18°N 02.48°W	ST6643
Cranmore	Isle of Wight	50.70°N 01.44°W	SZ3990
Cranoe	Leicestershire	52.54°N 00.89°W	SP7595
Cransford	Suffolk	52.22°N 01.38°E	TM3164
Cranshaws	Scottish Borders	55.84°N 02.51°W	NT6861
Cranstal	Isle of Man	54.39°N 04.37°W	NX4602
Cranswick	East Riding of Yorkshire	53.95°N 00.46°W	TA0152
Crantock	Cornwall	50.39°N 05.11°W	SW7960
Cranwell	Lincolnshire	53.02°N 00.46°W	TF0349
Cranwich	Norfolk	52.51°N 00.62°E	TL7894
Cranworth	Norfolk	52.59°N 00.92°E	TF9804
Craobh Haven	Argyll and Bute	56.20°N 05.56°W	NM7907
Crapstone	Devon	50.48°N 04.11°W	SX5067
Crarae	Argyll and Bute	56.12°N 05.25°W	NR9897
Crask	Highland	58.52°N 04.20°W	NC7262
Crask of Aigas	Highland	57.44°N 04.56°W	NH4642
Craster	Northumberland	55.46°N 01.60°W	NU2519
Craswall	Herefordshire	52.00°N 03.03°W	SO2934
Crateford	Shropshire	52.48°N 02.41°W	SO7288
Crateford	Staffordshire	52.67°N 02.14°W	SJ9009
Cratfield	Suffolk	52.32°N 01.38°E	TM3175
Crathes	Aberdeenshire	57.05°N 02.41°W	NO7596
Crathie	Highland	57.01°N 04.34°W	NN5894
Crathie	Aberdeenshire	57.03°N 03.22°W	NO2694
Crathorne	North Yorkshire	54.45°N 01.32°W	NZ4407
Craven Arms	Shropshire	52.43°N 02.83°W	SO4382
Crawcrook	Gateshead	54.96°N 01.79°W	NZ1363
Crawford	South Lanarkshire	55.46°N 03.66°W	NS9520
Crawford	West Lancashire	53.51°N 02.75°W	SD5002
Crawforddyke	South Lanarkshire	55.72°N 03.83°W	NS8549
Crawfordjohn	South Lanarkshire	55.48°N 03.79°W	NS8723
Crawick	Dumfries and Galloway	55.37°N 03.94°W	NS7711
Crawley	Devon	50.85°N 03.05°W	ST2607
Crawley	Hampshire	51.10°N 01.40°W	SU4234
Crawley	Oxfordshire	51.79°N 01.50°W	SP3411
Crawley	West Sussex	51.10°N 00.18°W	TQ2736
Crawley Down	West Sussex	51.11°N 00.08°W	TQ3437
Crawley End	Cambridgeshire	52.03°N 00.09°E	TL4440
Crawley Hill	Surrey	51.33°N 00.73°W	SU8860
Crawleyside	Durham	54.75°N 02.01°W	NY9940
Crawshaw	Kirklees	53.61°N 01.65°W	SE2313
Crawshawbooth	Lancashire	53.72°N 02.28°W	SD8125
Crawton	Shetland Islands	60.29°N 01.62°W	HU2157
Crawton	Aberdeenshire	56.90°N 02.21°W	NO8779
Cray	North Yorkshire	54.20°N 02.09°W	SD9479
Cray	Perth and Kinross	56.75°N 03.40°W	NO1463
Crayford	Bexley	51.44°N 00.17°E	TQ5174
Crayke	North Yorkshire	54.12°N 01.14°W	SE5670
Craymere Beck	Norfolk	52.82°N 01.05°E	TG0630
Crays Hill	Essex	51.60°N 00.46°E	TQ7192
Cray's Pond	Oxfordshire	51.51°N 01.09°W	SU6380
Crazies Hill	Berkshire	51.51°N 00.86°W	SU7980
