= Whitefield Castle =

Coordinates: 56.7380°N 3.4896°W

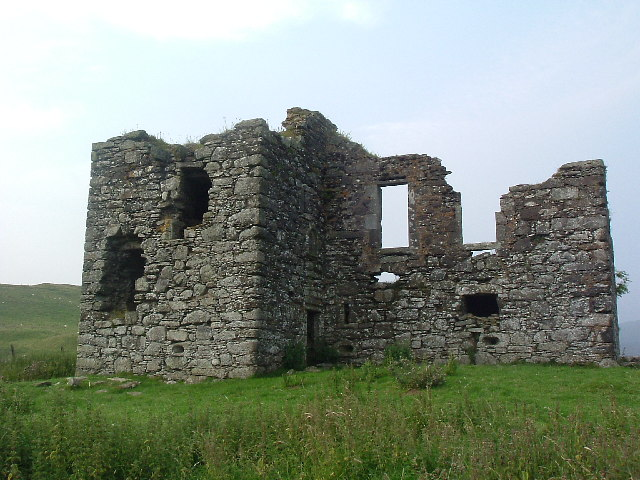
- Ruins of Whitefield Castle
- Interactive map of the Whitefield Castle area

General information
- Location: Perth and Kinross, Kirkmichael, Scotland
- Completed: 12th century

Whitefield Castle is a ruined L-plan tower-house on the hill above the village of Kirkmichael, in Strathardle, Perth and Kinross, Scotland.

== History ==
Built in the 12th century by King Malcolm III as a hunting lodge, it was expanded in 1577 by the Spalding family. It is now ruinous.

The castle also has a ley tunnel legend, a tradition often found associated with ancient residences. This tunnel was said to link up with nearby Ashintully Castle.
