= Cray Parish Church =

- Cray Free Church of Scotland; Kirkmichael Free Church of Scotland
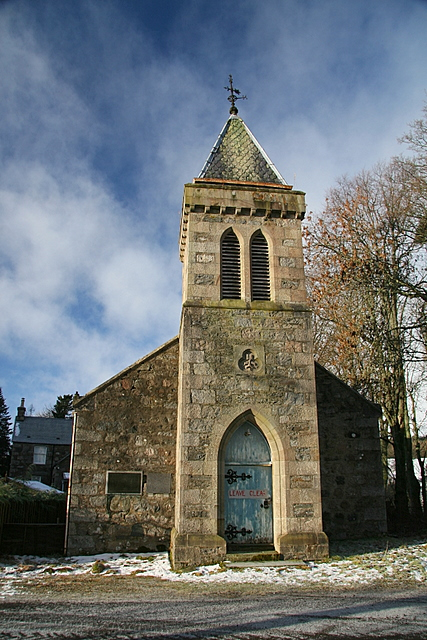
- The church building in 2009
- Cray Parish Church
- 56°45′23″N 3°23′50″W
- Location: Cray, Perth and Kinross
- Country: Scotland
- Denomination: Church of Scotland

History
- Status: Closed

Architecture
- Functional status: Disused
- Heritage designation: Category C listed building
- Designated: 9 June 1981
- Architectural type: Gothic
- Years built: 1844, 182 years ago

Cray Parish Church, also known as Cray Free Church and Kirkmichael Free Church, is a former Church of Scotland church in Cray, Perth and Kinross, Scotland. It is located in Kirkmichael parish, on the northern side of the B951, which forms part of the 64 miles (103 km)-long Cateran Trail.

Built in 1844, it is a Category C listed building. Highbury House, the former manse, built in 1845, stands immediately to the southwest of the church. The church tower was added, with a pyramid slated roof, in 1864. Its bell, made by Vickers and Co. and installed when the tower was renovated, is nearly 29 inches (740 mm) in diameter. Two years later, the manse was extended.

== Gallery ==
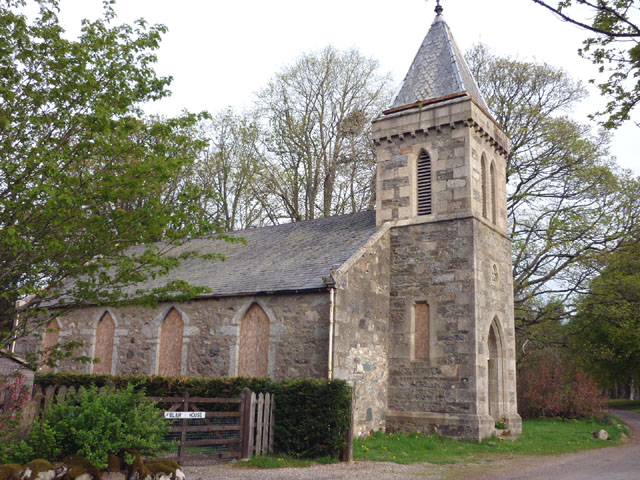
The southern side of the church

== See also ==
- List of listed buildings in Kirkmichael, Perth and Kinross
