= Alexander Duff (missionary) =

Scottish Christian missionary in India (1806–1878)

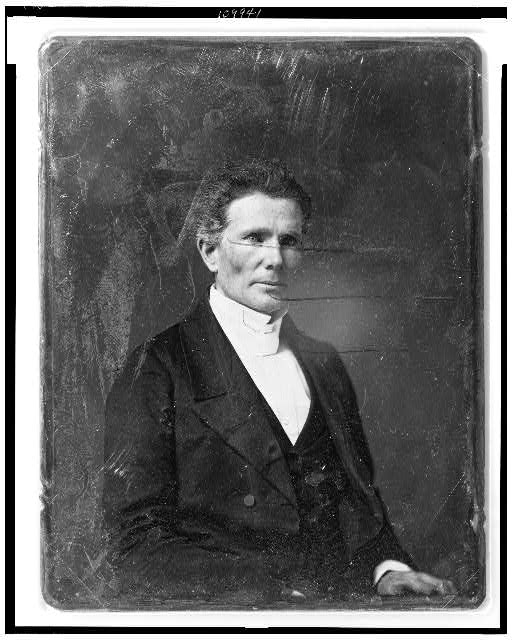
- Alexander Duff

Personal details
- Born: 25 April 1806 Auchnahyle, Perthshire, Scotland
- Died: 12 February 1878 (aged 71) Sidmouth, Devon, England
- Spouse: Anne Scott Drysdale (m.1829 - 1865)
- Children: Rebecca (b.1830), James (b.1831), Alexander (b.1834), Ann (b.1836), William (b.1838)
- Occupation: Missionary, Teacher
- Education: University of St. Andrews

Alexander Duff (25 April 1806 – 12 February 1878), was a Scottish missionary in India; where he played a large part in the development of higher education. He was a Moderator of the General Assembly and convener of the foreign missions committee of the Free Church of Scotland and a scientific liberal reformer of anglicized evangelism across the Empire. He was the first overseas missionary of the Church of Scotland to India. On 13 July 1830 he founded the General Assembly's Institution in Calcutta, now known as the Scottish Church College. He also played a part in establishing the University of Calcutta. He was twice Moderator of the Free Church of Scotland in 1851 and 1873, the only person to serve the role twice.

== Early life ==
Alexander Duff was born in Auchnahyle, Scotland, and raised parish of Moulin, Perthshire and was brought up at Balnakeilly. His parents were James Duff, gardener and farmer at Auchnahagh, and Jean Rattray. Alexander had 5 siblings. Margaret, William, Findlay, John and Jean. After receiving his initial schooling at the Moulin and Kirkmichael Schools, and Perth Academy (where he was dux), he studied arts and theology at the University of St. Andrews. He was greatly influenced by the teaching, missionary fervour, and personality of Thomas Chalmers, then Professor of Moral Philosophy.

He graduated with an M.A. (Hons) in 1824. Subsequently he was licensed to preach by Presbytery of St Andrews in April 1829. Duff was ordained by the Presbytery of Edinburgh on 12 August following as first (official) missionary of the Church of Scotland to India. Travelling to there, he left Edinburgh on 19 September and sailed 14 October 1829.

== Mission in India ==
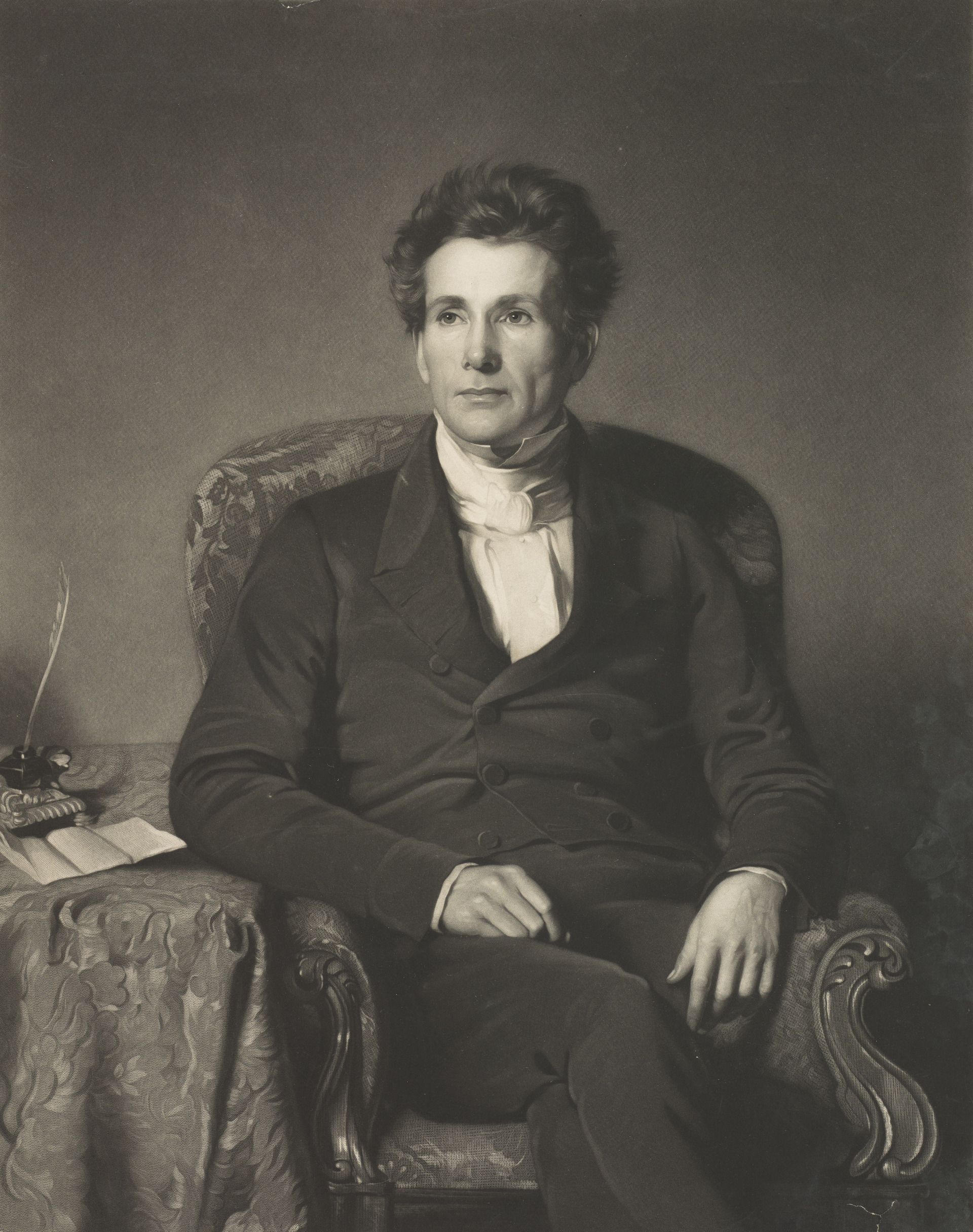
Alexander Duff, 1806 - 1878. Scottish missionary and educationalist

After an adventurous voyage during which he was twice shipwrecked, Duff arrived in Calcutta on 27 May 1830. After inspecting the Bengali schools, he concluded that students were not receiving an adequate education in a broad range of subjects and secondly, that he would instruct his students using English instead of the local dialects. He at once identified himself with a policy which had far-reaching effects. Christian missions in India had been successful only in converting a few low-caste groups from a poor socio-economic background. The upper caste Hindu and Muslim communities had been practically untouched. Duff shrewdly assessed that these affluent communities could not be accessed by traditional evangelical methods. He recognised that holding out the prospect of upward mobility, by offering a western education, would bring the children of the affluent classes into his range of influence, which could then be extended to encompass religion. Duff devised the policy by using a western system of education to slowly convert Hindus and Muslims to Christianity. The success of his work had the effect:

1. of altering the policy of the government of India in matters of education;
2. of securing the recognition of education as a missionary agency by Christian churches at home; and,
3. of securing entrance for Christian ideas into the minds of high-caste Hindus.

By teaching biblical courses as well as courses in the physical sciences, Duff hoped that students would logically come to realise the contradictions and impracticality of Hinduism and embrace wholeheartedly the truth of Christianity. Even as his educational and academic work is prospered, the remarkable conversions were no longer so obvious. While a few students converted, Duff seems to have widely miscalculated the resilience of Hinduism as well as its ability to adapt itself to western knowledge. Whereas Duff and many of his fellow evangelists saw Christianity and Hinduism as diametrically opposed, Hindus did not generally consider the knowledge either tradition provided as mutually exclusive with the other.

== Education in English ==
Duff opened a school in which all kinds of secular subjects were taught, from the rudiments upwards to a university standard, alongside the Bible. The English language was used as the medium of instruction on the grounds that it was the key to Western knowledge. Alexander Duff proposed a theory which he called the "downward filter theory" in which he believed that by catering to the middle and upper social classes, the knowledge of Christianity would eventually filter down the social ladder. Although he promoted the teaching of English in schools, he still viewed the vernacular as an important language for spreading Christianity among "the masses" but deemed it inferior to the English language because it was not progressive. Duff wrote a pamphlet on the question, entitled A New Era of the English Language and Literature in India. A government minute was adopted on 7 March 1835, to the effect that in higher education, the object of the British government in India should be the promotion of European science and literature among the natives of India, and that all funds appropriated for purposes of education would be best employed on English education alone. His views influenced Peter Percival, a pioneering educator, linguist and missionary who worked in Sri Lankan Tamil dominant Jaffna Peninsula in Sri Lanka.

Within the British Indian community of that era, there were not lacking those "Orientalists" who saw value in the traditional learning of India and wished to support and encourage it. They opposed Duff's policy of stringently disregarding the same while assiduously promoting the spread of western education, culture and religion. In 1839, Lord Auckland, the governor-general of India, yielded to them and adopted a policy which was a compromise between the two perspectives.

Regardless, English became the tool through which Indians were able to understand and advance themselves through the British institutions of government. This opportunity to share in governance established one of the foundations on which eventual self-rule was built.

== The Institutes ==
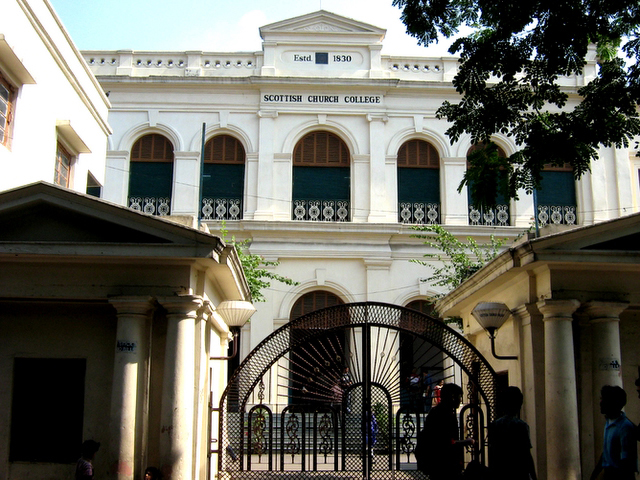
Scottish Church College

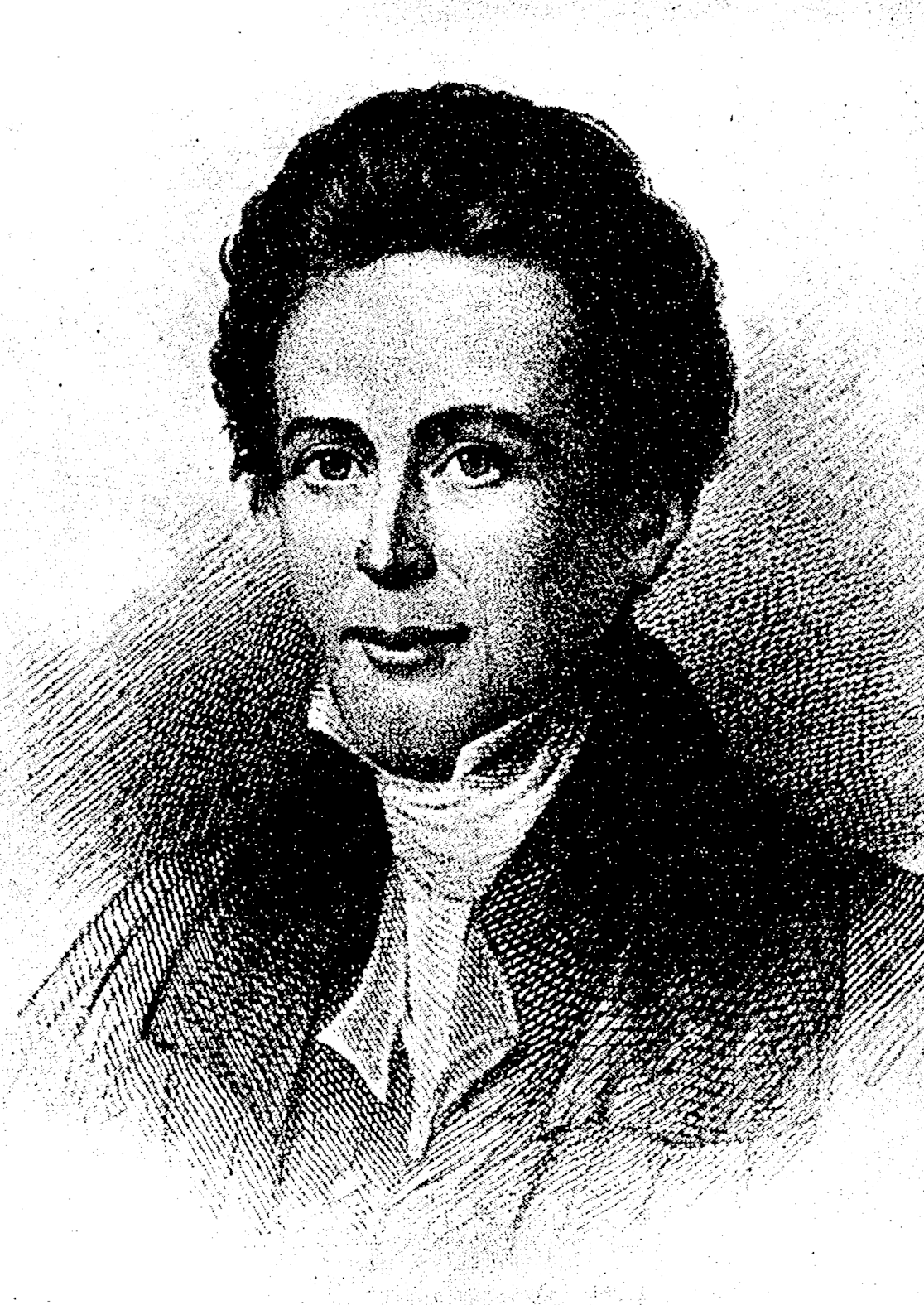
Alexander Duff at thirty

Shortly after landing in India in 1830, Duff opened his institution in a house located at upper Chitpur Road in the Jorasanko neighbourhood of Calcutta. The house was made available to him by Feringhi Kamal Bose, an affluent Hindu. The school soon began to expand into a missionary college, known as the General Assembly's Institution. The location was a source of controversy for the Missions Committee who wanted to remain at the heart of Bengali society in the city of Calcutta. In 1834, Duff returned to Britain broken in health. During this sojourn, he succeeded in securing the approval of his church for his educational plans, and in arousing much interest in the work of foreign missions. His struggles were described in a speech at Exeter Hall on 8 May 1837 that called for hundreds of thousands of new teachers for India.

In 1836, the Calcutta institution was moved to Gorachand Bysack's house in the Garanhata neighbourhood. On 23 February 1837, Mr. MacFarlon, the Chief Magistrate of Calcutta, laid the foundation stone for a new building belonging to the mission itself. The building was designed by John Gray construction was superintended by Capt. John Thomson, both of the East India Company. The construction of the building was completed in 1839.

Duff returned to India in 1840, by which time The Institution had expanded to 600 Indian pupils from five to nine years old. At the Disruption of 1843, Duff sided with the Free Church. He gave up the college buildings, with all their effects, and with unabated courage set to work to provide a new institution, which came to be known as the Free Church Institution. In 1857, when the University of Calcutta was established, the Free Church Institution was one of its earliest affiliates, and Duff would also serve in the university's first senate.

These two institutions founded by Duff, i.e., the General Assembly's Institution and the Free Church Institution would be merged in 1908 to form the Scottish Churches' College. After the unification of the Church of Scotland in 1929, the institution would be known as Scottish Church College. He had the support of Sir James Outram and Sir Henry Lawrence, and the encouragement of seeing a new band of converts, including several young men born of high caste. In 1844, governor-general Viscount Hardinge opened government appointments to all who had studied in institutions similar to Duff's institution. In the same year, Duff co-founded the Calcutta Review, of which he served as editor from 1845 to 1849.

Several important Indian figures were products of Duff's Institutions. Most notably, Rev. Lal Behari Dey, who wrote two books (Folk Tales of Bengal and Bengal Peasant Life) that were widely distributed among Indian schools, and Krishna Mohan Banerjee, who became registrar of Calcutta University .

== Later years ==
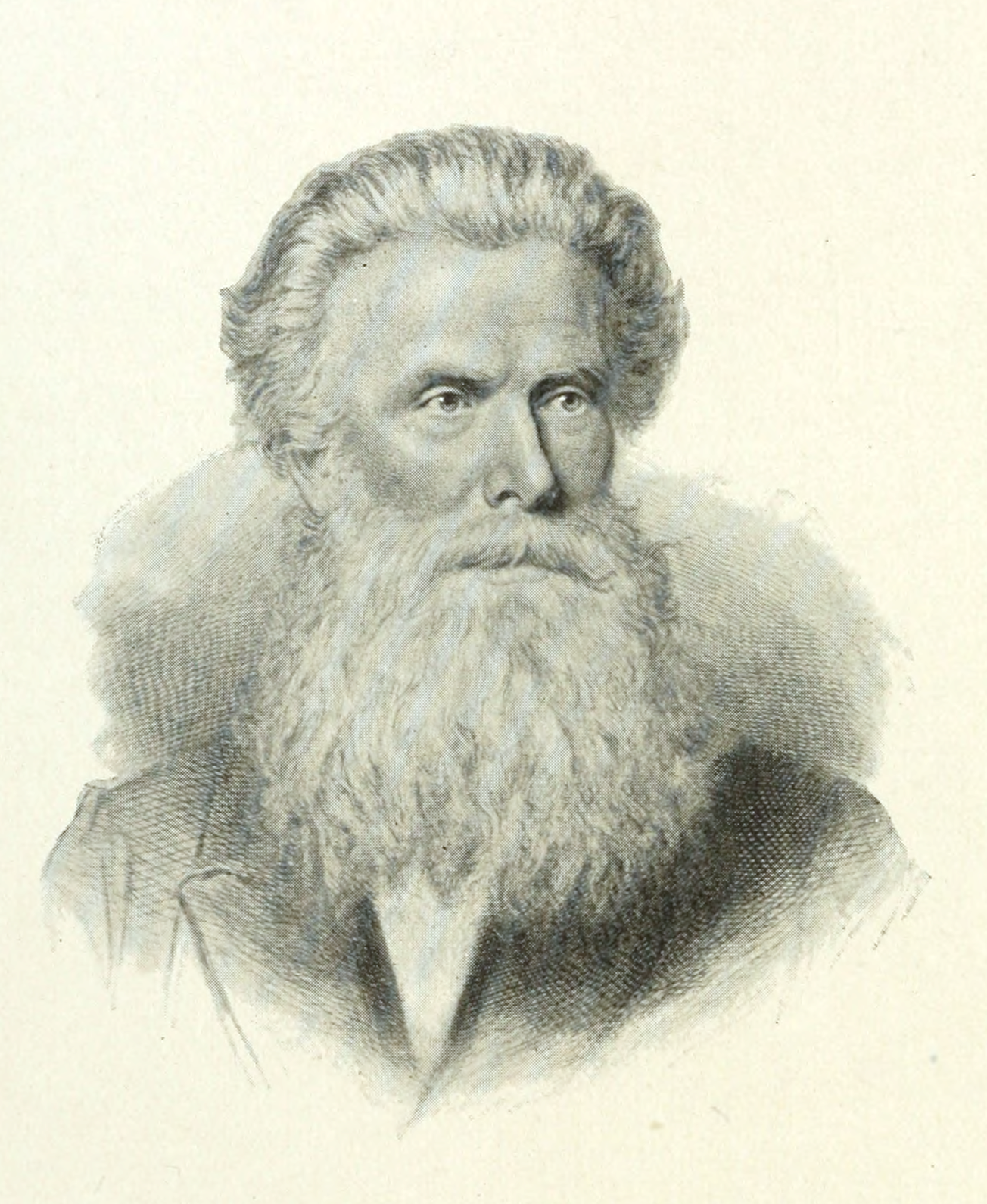
Alexander Duff by Jeens

In 1849, Duff returned to Scotland.

He was elected Moderator of the General Assembly of the Free Church of Scotland in 1851, in succession to Nathaniel Paterson.

He gave evidence before various Indian committees of parliament on matters of education. He was asked by Lord Granville to testify to the House of Lords, in which he hoped to influence the Wood's Educational Despatch of 1854. This led to an important despatch by Viscount Halifax, president of the Board of Control, to governor-general the Marquess of Dalhousie, authorising an educational advance in primary and secondary schools; the provision of technical and scientific teaching; and the establishment of schools for girls. In 1854, Duff visited the United States, where what is now New York University gave him the degree of L.L.D.; he was already D.D. of the University of Aberdeen. While in the USA, he addressed Congress and spoke to many congregations; he also visited Knox College in Toronto, Canada, and spoke at meetings in Montreal and other cities.

In 1856, Duff returned to India, where the mutiny broke out the following year; his descriptive letters written during this period were collected in a volume entitled The Indian Mutiny - its Causes and Results (1858). During this stint in India, Duff gave much thought and time to the University of Calcutta, which owes its examination system and the prominence given to physical sciences to his influence. In 1863, Sir Charles Trevelyan offered him the post of vice-chancellor of the university, but his health compelled him to leave India. As a memorial of his work, the Duff Hall was erected in the centre of the educational buildings of Calcutta.

In 1864, Duff visited South Africa, and on his return, became convener of the foreign missions committee of the Free Church. In 1870 he was the principal force in founding the Anglo-Indian Christian Union (an alliance of Protestant churches to minister to scattered British communities in India), of which he became the first President, and sent Rev. John Fordyce to India as the Union's Commissioner there. He raised money to endow a missionary chair in Evangelistic Theology at New College, Edinburgh, and himself became first professor. Among other missionary labours of his later years, he helped the Free Church mission on Lake Nyassa, travelled to Syria to inspect a mission at Lebanon, and assisted Lady Aberdeen and Lord Polwarth to establish the Gordon Memorial Mission in Natal. In 1873, the Free Church was threatened with a schism owing to negotiations for union with the United Presbyterian Church. Duff was called to the chair, and guided the church through this crisis. He also took part in forming the alliance of Reformed Churches holding the Presbyterian system.

Alexander Duff died in Sidmouth, Devon on 12 February 1878. He is buried with his wife, Ann Scott Drysdale, in the north-east section of the Grange Cemetery in Edinburgh.

By his will, he devoted his personal property to found a lectureship on foreign missions at New College (now part of the University of Edinburgh) on the model of the Bampton Lectures.

== Friendships and other achievements ==
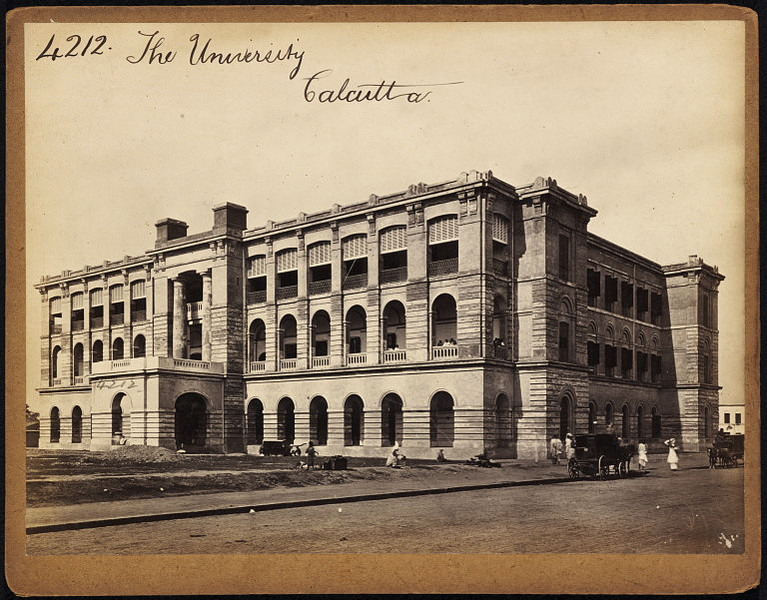
The Calcutta University by Francis Frith. Duff's foundation of 1857

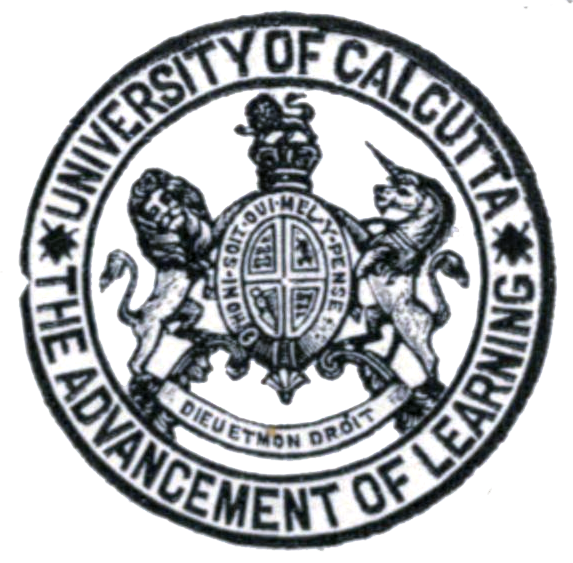
Logo of Calcutta University – a very British institution founded for the education of Indians

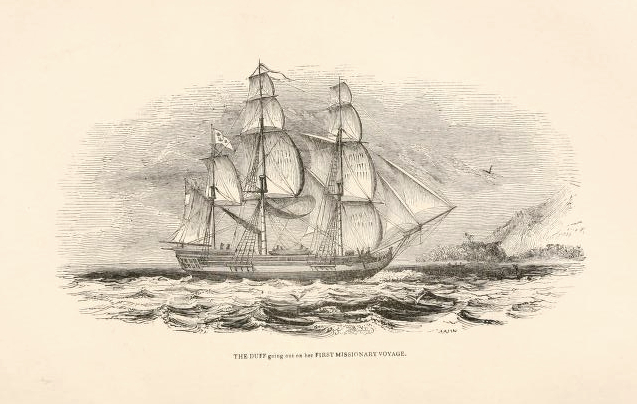
Duff on missionary voyage

By the age of thirty he was already a remarkable preacher. Joining the Church Missionary Society in 1836 he and his friend Rev Dr James Lewis were shapers of the new Church of Scotland Mission. Of his many Scottish friends, Dr Robert Hall was a leading academic, a powerful orator, with a large retentive memory whose impulsive liberalism formed his early beliefs. They helped him publish a pamphlet English Education in India which formed part of his address to the General Assembly of the Kirk in Edinburgh in 1837, which he dedicated to the students of the four ancient universities. A passionate advocate of reform he banished corporal punishments for girls, striving to Christianise education through humane methods of teaching. In seeking out William Hopkins Pearce for a new Baptist mission, he emphasised the inter-denominational character of united prayer events. He was unassuming, modest, pious, and quite uninterested in the politics of popery and anti-papism. Yet only the Episcopalians remained beyond his reach with their broad brush Quarterly publications. Despite the perceived handicap he could influence serious political figures in the Indian civil Service through the media of Calcutta Review. In one article he made an advancement in liberal theology exposing the cruelty of Female Infanticide in Central and Western India (1844). And in the same year his power in the Free Church was rehearsed in a lecture to The Free Churchmen of Calcutta in the Masonic Hall. Its title "The Sole and Supreme Headship of the Lord Jesus Christ over His Own Church, or a voice from the Ganges relative to the courses which led to the recent disruption..." symbolised his conviction in the supremacy of Christianity to bring enlightened education to Indians. Two Bengali intellectuals travelled to Edinburgh to be baptised at Duff's request. Mahendra Lal Bazak and Khailai Chandra Mukherjya were closely watched by Dr Thomas Chalmers. Dr. Chalmers' death in 1847 was a real blow to the Free Church; and to Duff, his pupil and then successor as professor. It forced Duff to deny his Scottishness to maintain a life dedicated to working in India. He refused the principalship in 1874. Duff knew him well in the cultural capital of Scotland pursuing moral, material and spiritual development while steering his charges away from the temptations of Heathenism. During 1845–46 he conducted numerous Indian conversions with typical missionary zeal. Exhibiting a strong sense of Scottish character he personified individual freedoms, baptising Jewish refugees, overcoming prejudice, and persisting in the face of prohibitive rules among the Hindu caste system. A tireless campaigner, and restless traveller from Calcutta to Ceylon, he visited thousands of missionaries and their stations. A profound sense of duty was monitored by legal correctness of his own opinions, that never ceased to improve. Deeply rooted in the doctrine of justification by faith alone, he mixed doctrinal worship with regular business committees to raise money for the church.

Eloquent, he recalled the poems of Ossian and Jacobite songs.

Disappointed by the slow progress of change, he embarked on a trip to America. In Toronto he gave a sermon to Kroom's Church. On his last day he preached at the Broadway Tabernacle, where he received benediction. Hugely popular, he was bade farewell by weeping crowds from the Hudson River wharves on 13 May 1854. Back in England he was met by Lord Haddo, son of Prime Minister, Lord Aberdeen. After sipping the Malvern Spa waters for a cure, he decided on a Grand Tour of Europe and the Holy Land with his friend Dr James Lumsden. At his death he was acclaimed by Scot William Ewart Gladstone as an heroic, apostolic saint. A memorial Celtic cross was erected at Pitlochry parish church to celebrate a life of deep Christian service.

== Family ==
He married 30 July 1829, Anne Scott Drysdale, Edinburgh (died 22 February 1865), and had issue –

- Rebecca Jane, born 24 June 1830 (married 5 May 1852, John Watson, East India merchant), died at London, 7 November 1896
- James Murray, born 26 September 1831, died 5 June 1832
- Alexander Groves, physician, born 19 July 1834
- Ann Jemima, born 5 August 1836, died 26 May 1841
- William Pirie, merchant, Calcutta, born 9 November 1838, died at Edinburgh, 31 January 1899.
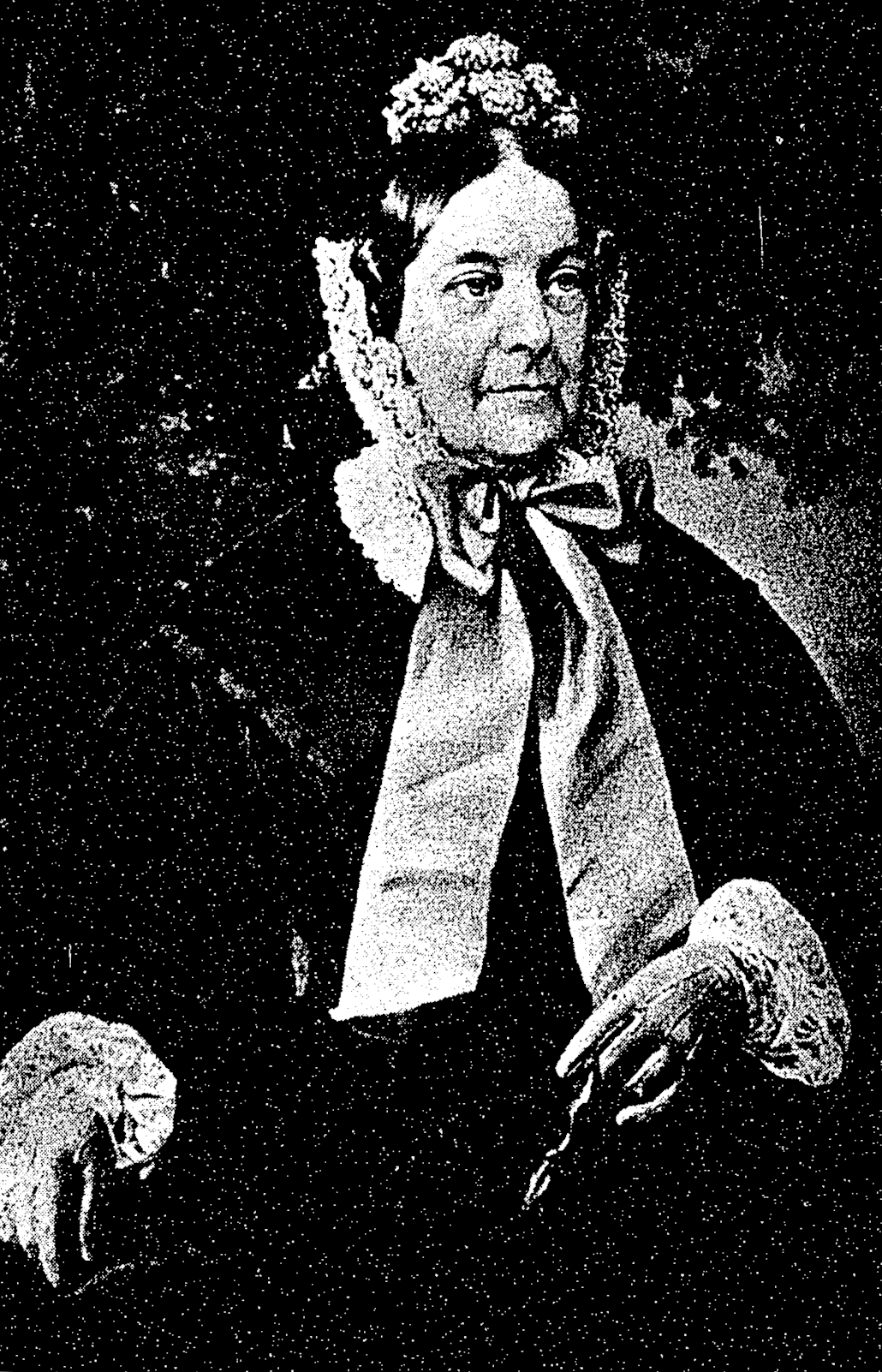
Mrs Anne Scott Duff nee Drysdale

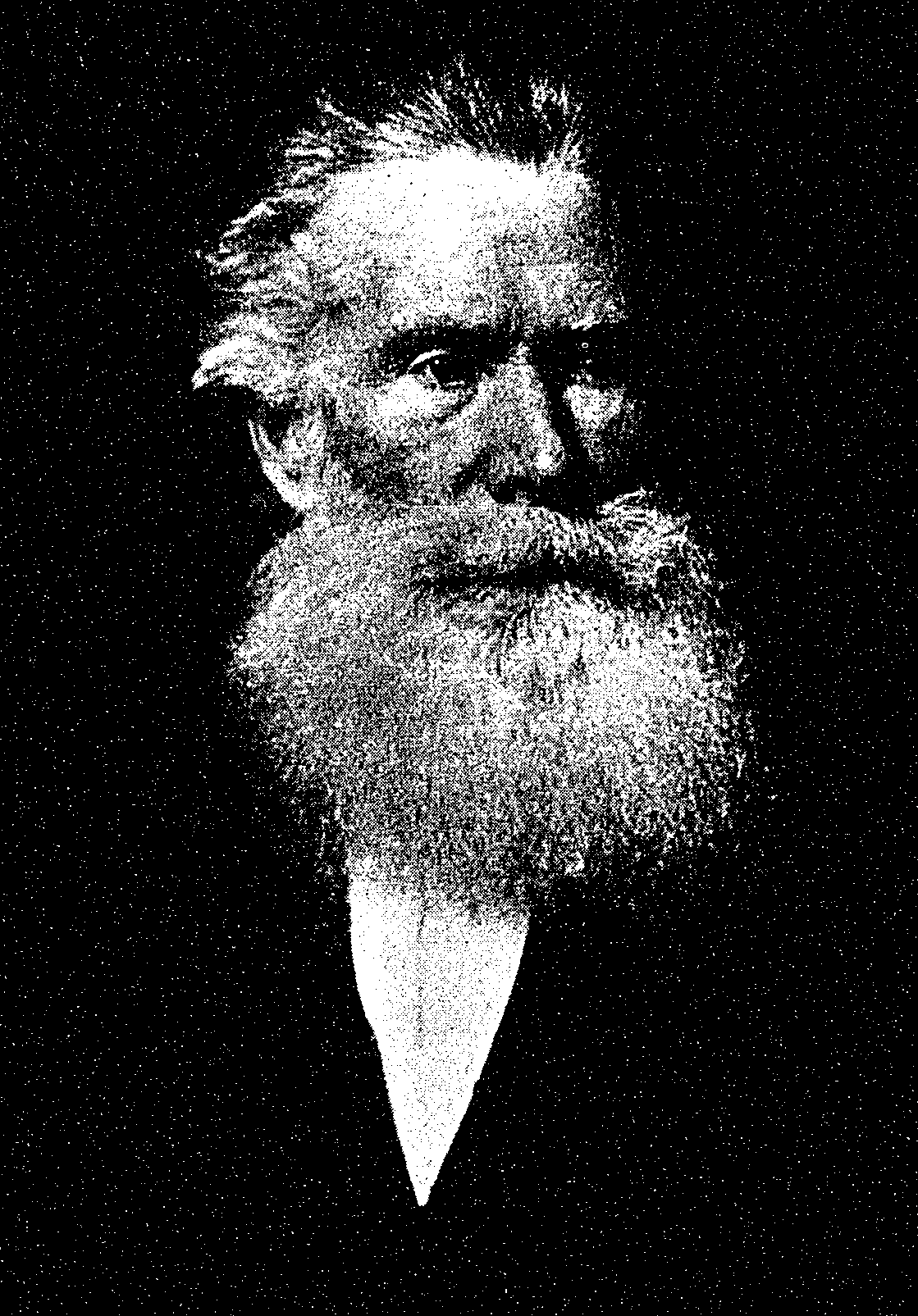
Alexander Duff aged sixty-seven

== Legacy and influence ==
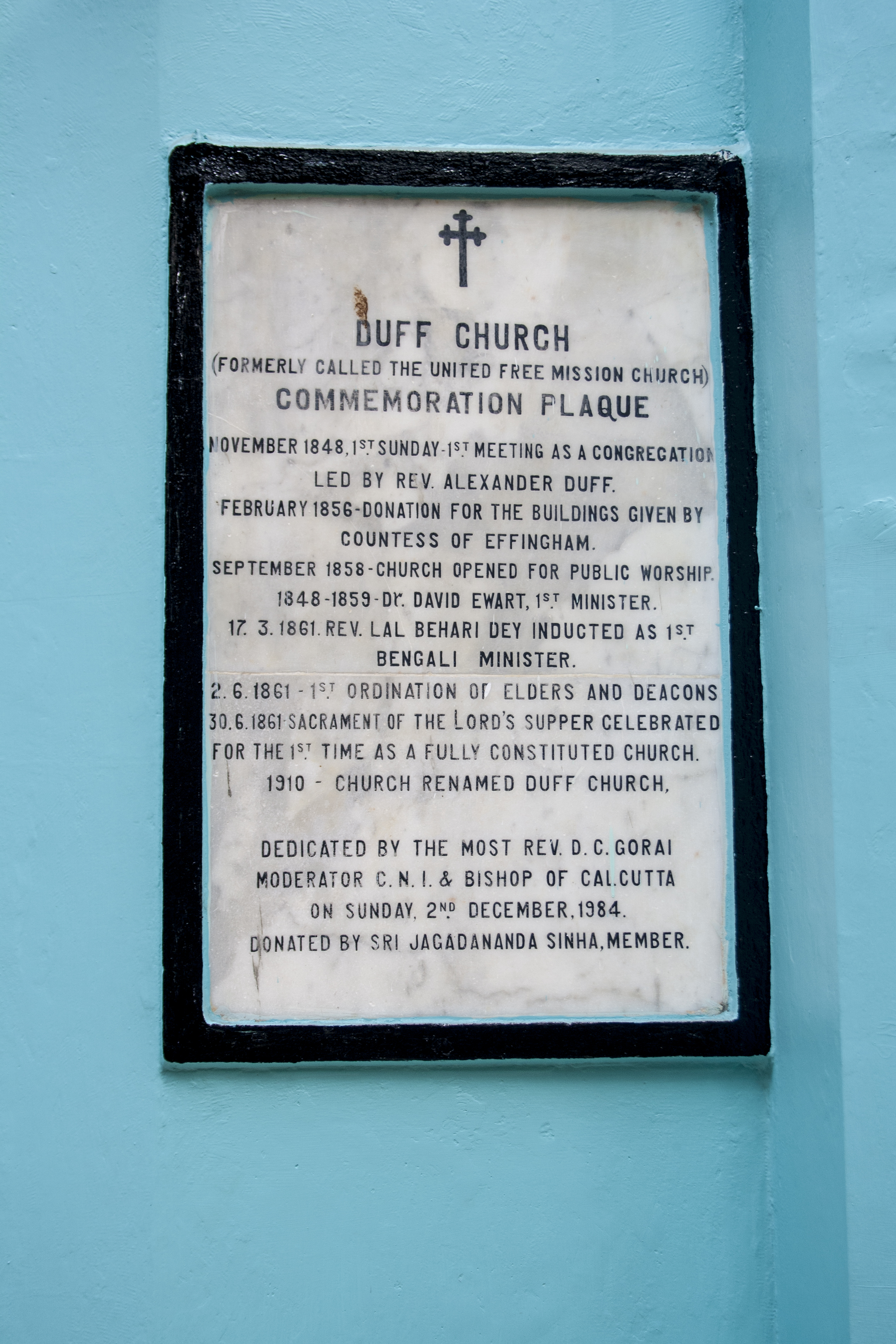
Duff Church 03

Alexander Duff was incredibly influential in Indian education and government and set several precedents. Almost as soon as he arrived his evangelising changed Indian education: in 1832 another Scot, John Wilson (Scottish missionary) established a school in Bombay. Duff's methods were widely imitated and his cumulative twenty-five years in the subcontinent were largely characterised by the establishment of western-style educational institutions warmly received by Ram Mohan Roy. Duff can be credited with creating a framework that influenced educational policy and practice during the nineteenth century and beyond. Since his schools catered mostly to the Hindu middle class, he was able to receive attention from the government which helped to spread his methods and ideas. Several other English schools were established because the General Assemblies Institution was so successful. The success and influence of Duff's college led to the founding of the Calcutta Medical College. Hindu scriptures forbid people of higher castes from touching dead bodies, which prevented medical students from performing cadaver dissections. Students from Duff's college expressed that their liberal, English education had "freed their minds from prejudice and the dissection of the human body was not objectionable to them." This new idea allowed higher caste Indians to pursue medical professions, therefore advancing healthcare in India.

The top-down theory of education described above typifies Duff's evangelical elitism, one of the main elements of his legacy in the subcontinent. Duff seems to have believed that there was a direct relationship between education and missionary work. Not only was the education of the Indian people critical to his goal of dispelling "Hindu ignorance" but it was in fact the duty of evangelicals to modernise and instruct Indian society using Western ideals and texts. While Duff was a highly skilled scholar who was devoted to India, his evangelistic ideals and western prejudice may have influenced his students in ways that he did not anticipate. Instead of initiating a mass conversion to Christianity he may have instead provided another catalyst for Hindu reform movements.

Duff hoped that through a western education in a time of enlightenment, Indians would be able to see the flaws in their religion and be compelled to convert to Christianity, but he did not consider the resilience of the Hindu religion and his efforts proved to be fairly unsuccessful on the broader scale. Educations of the Christian bible was accepted by Hindus because they were confident in their own religion and were not worried that their children would lose their faith. Hinduism was not only a religion but a culture, and the occupation of the British and their ideas was not drastic enough to change this. Because Alexander Duff was regarded well, his character served as a model to his students and friends and his teaching did eventually lead to some reformist movements within Hinduism. In fact, Duff's work led to the acceptance of more Indians into public official positions in government. This experience was critical to the transitional Indian government after Independence in 1947. A Church was established in 1848 and named as Duff Church in 1910 in memory of Alexander Duff. Another church, in Kirkmichael, Perth and Kinross, Scotland, is named Duff Memorial Church in his honour. Duff attended primary school in the village.

== Works by Dr Duff ==
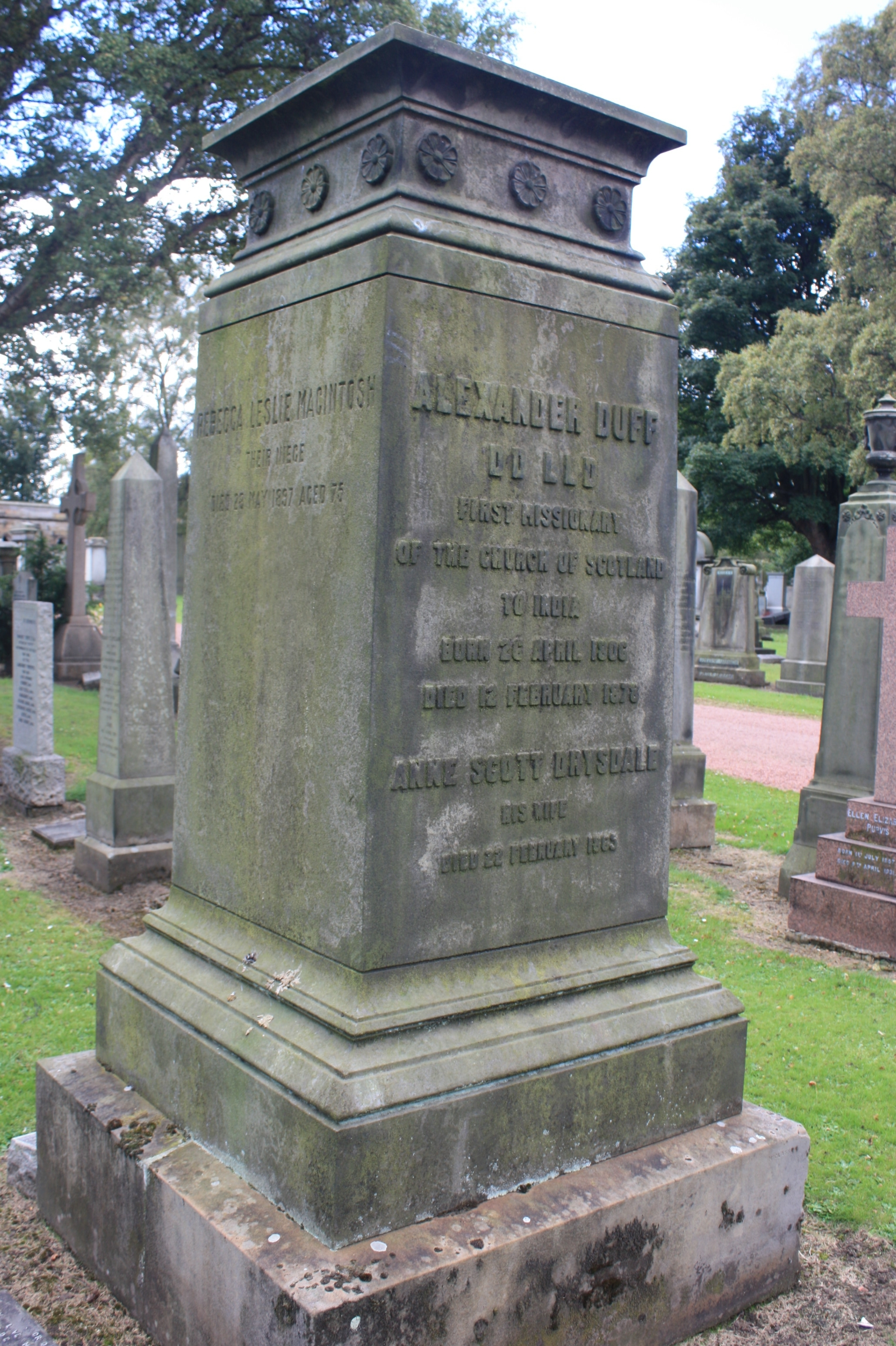
Rev Alexander Duff's grave, Grange Cemetery

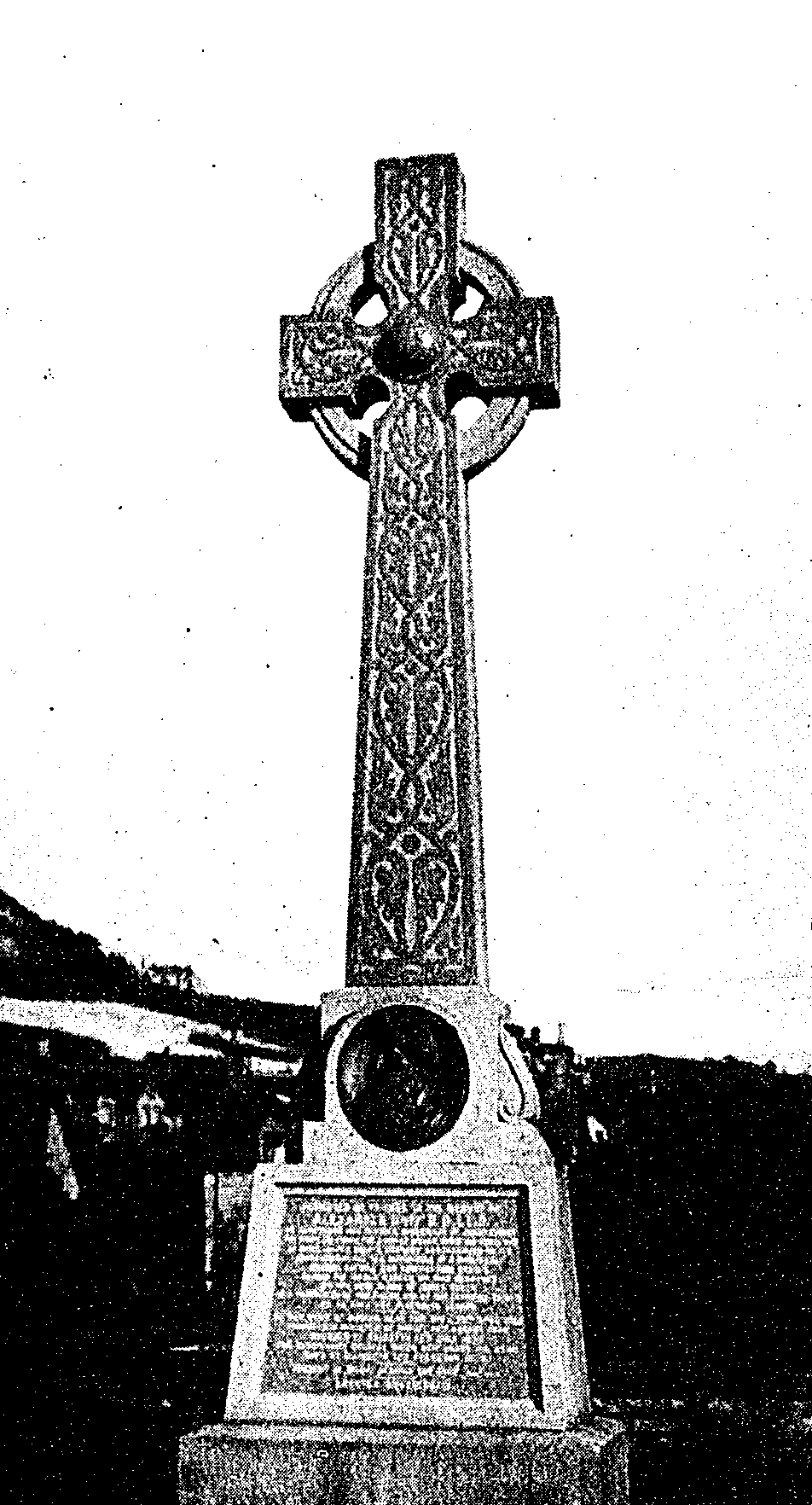
Alexander Duff memorial cross at Pitlochry Parish Church

- 'The Church of Scotland's India Mission,’ 1835.
- 'Vindication of the Church of Scotland's India Missions,’ 1837.
- 'New Era of English Language and Literature in India,’ 1837.
- 'Missions the end of the Christian Church,’ 1839.
- 'Farewell Address,’ 1839.
- 'India and India Missions,’ 1840.
- 'The Headship of the Lord Jesus Christ,’ 1844.
- 'Lectures on the Church of Scotland,’ delivered at Calcutta, 1844.
- 'The Jesuits,’ 1845.
- 'Missionary Addresses,’ 1850.
- 'Farewell Address to the Free Church of Scotland,’ 1855.
- Several sermons and pamphlets.
- 'The World-wide Crisis,’ 1873.
- 'The True Nobility – Sketches of Lord Haddo and the Hon. J. H. Hamilton Gordon.'
- Various articles in the 'Calcutta Review.'
