= Baron of Balmachreuchie =

Title of nobility in the Baronage of Scotland

- Creation: Baronage of Scotland
- Status: Extant

Baron of Balmachreuchie is a title of nobility in the Baronage of Scotland.

The lands of Balmachreuchie date back to 1280 when they were granted to Sir Robert Lauder by Duncan, Earl of Fife. These lands, valued for their natural resources and strategic location, were frequently involved in legal disputes and transactions among prominent Scottish families. Early records detail transfers and conflicts over the land, which shaped the region's feudal landscape.

The Barony of Balmachreuchie was formally established in the 15th century when the lands became part of the Maxwells' baronial holdings. From then on, the barony was central to regional power struggles, marked by military raids, territorial disputes, and legal dealings. The Maxwells and Fergusons were key families who influenced the barony’s development.

Over the centuries, the Barony of Balmachreuchie passed through various noble families, including the Spaldings and Rutherfords, who further consolidated control.

== Origin of the name ==
The name Balmachreuchie may derive from a few different Gaelic sources. One interpretation suggests it stems from three components: ‘Bal,’ meaning ‘settlement,’ ‘na,’ meaning ‘of,’ and one of the following terms:

- ‘chreuchie,’ which refers to peat stacks or a combination of stone and clay
- ‘creuthachaidh,’ which relates to small springs
- ‘crao-bhachaidh,’ which refers to clusters of trees or a wooded hill

Despite these variations, the pronunciation remains consistent: bal-muh-crew-hee. Balmachreuchie can be translated as “The Settlement at the Peat Stacks,” “The Settlement of Stone and Clay Buildings,” “The Settlement at the Small Springs,” or “The Settlement at the Small Wood or Woodhill.”

== History ==
=== 1200–1400 ===
In 1280, Duncan, Earl of Fife, granted Sir Robert Lauder parts of the lands of Balmachreuchie. The charter provided Lauder and his heirs with full rights over the land, including hunting and the use of natural resources.

Balmachreuchie is also referenced in a charter issued to William, Earl of Douglas. This document, which granted lands including Balmachothlie (Balmachreuchie), Logibryde, and Blaborg within the barony of Schathurd (Strathardle), remains undated but must have been written after January 1358, when William assumed the title of Earl of Douglas during the reign of King David II.

In 1358, a dispute arose between Fergus, son of Adam of Balmacrochie, and Robert de Atholia, son of Duncan of Atholl. Both were ancestors of the Robertsons of Struan and were involved in a conflict with the Sheriff of Perth regarding their failure to meet obligations related to the lands of Balnafert, Balmacreechie, and Balnakand. The Sheriff was compensated £12 for their non-compliance.

In 1365, a portion of Balmacruchie was transferred to Dunfermline Abbey. Later, in 1389, during the Raid of Angus, the Robertsons of Upper Strathardle and the Stewarts of Atholl attacked Glen Esk in Angus, resulting in deaths and the theft of cattle. In response, Sir Walter Ogilvie led forces from Angus into Strathardle, but they were defeated by the Fergusons of Balmachreuchie.

=== 1400–1540 ===
Around 1400, the Maxwell family acquired the lands of Balmacreuchie in Perthshire. Prior to the Spaldings’ acquisition of the barony, Blackcraig Castle, located near the farm of Balmachreuchie, served as the baronial seat. On 13 October 1505, a significant event took place at Caerlaverock when John, Lord Maxwell of Nithsdale, granted his heir and assignee, Sir William Maxwell of Tealing, the lands of Strathardle, which formed part of his barony of ‘Balmacrewchy’ in Perthshire.

The witnesses to the charter’s signing included Edward Maxwell of Tynwald, Nicholas Macbare (provost of Dumfries), Thomas and Robert Maxwell (full-blooded brothers), Robert Gladstone, George Douglas, and John Turner, chaplains, as well as John MacHome (rector of Castlemilk) and William Robert, a chaplain and notary public.

The 3rd Lord Maxwell died at the Battle of Flodden in 1513 alongside King James IV and many members of the Scottish nobility.

In the early modern period, several families, including the Spaldings of Ashintully, the Fergusons of Balmachreuchie, and the Robertsons of Straloch, held influence in Strathardle. In 1510, William Scott of Balwearie sold lands in Perthshire to John Ferguson of Dunfallanty, which included parts of Strathardle and Glenshee. Two years later, on 20 January 1512, King James IV formally granted the central areas of Strathardle, known as the barony of Douny, to John Ferguson and his heirs.

On 28 July 1534, King James V confirmed Robert, Lord Maxwell, in the lands and barony of Balmacreuchy while residing at Falkland Palace in Fife. This was further reaffirmed on 6 June 1540 in Edinburgh, incorporating his various lands and baronies into a free barony of Maxwell.

By 1539, parts of the Balmacreuchie barony were transferred to John Robertson of Straloch, also known as Ruadh (the Red), upon his marriage to Elizabeth Maxwell, daughter of the Laird of Tealing.

=== 1540 – late 1700s ===
On 7 July 1550, a legal dispute involving tenants from Easter Perce (Persie) was brought before the Abbot of Coupar Angus Abbey. John Spalding of Ashintully and Mr. Robert Spalding were among the witnesses, marking one of the earliest mentions of the Spalding family in Strathardle records.

Shortly after, on 5 August 1550, Lord Robert Maxwell, was formally named as his father’s heir to the lands and barony of Balcreuchy (Balmachreuchie).

The Maxwell family continued overseeing their estates. On 15 January 1585, Alexander Maxwell of Tealing granted a feu charter for Easter and Wester Dalnabreck within the barony of Balmachreuchie to his son, George Maxwell, while his wife, Helen Bruce, retained life rent rights.

On 10 November 1591, David Maxwell of Tealing and his son Hugh leased the town and lands of Corridou, located in the barony of Balmachreuchie, to James Spalding under feu farm conditions.

Two days later, on 12 November 1591, David and Hugh Maxwell sold a quarter of the Wester Ennoch lands, also within the barony, to Donald Robertson (or Neilson) and his wife, Janet Robertson.

On 23 November 1594, David Maxwell and his son Hugh granted a charter for the lands of Balmacreuchie to Thomas Ferguson, a portioner, and Alexander Ferguson, a Burgess of Dundee. This transaction was recorded by Scotland’s highest civil court, the Court of Session.

On 8 May 1612, Hugh Maxwell of Tealing was appointed Sheriff of Forfar, with his deputies serving as Sheriffs of Perth. This appointment gave him control over lands inherited from his father, Sir David Maxwell, including Easter and Wester Dalmabrecks, Pitcairn with its mill, Balmylne, Wester and Easter Ballatoun, and Easter and Wester Innoch with the mill of Brodarg and Coredun, all located within the barony of Balmacreuchie.

By 13 July 1619, Robert Maxwell, 10th Lord of Maxwell, had inherited the lands and barony of Balmacreuchie following the death of his brother, John Maxwell, 9th Lord of Maxwell.

Later, on 19 September 1621, King James VI, while residing in England, granted Robert, the 1st Earl of Nithsdale, various estates, primarily in the southwest of Scotland. These included Balmacreuchie in Perthshire, which was incorporated into the wider lordship and barony of Maxwell.

On 18 March 1670, Janet Stewart was confirmed as the heir to her brother, Alexander Stewart of Balmyle, gaining rights to part of the Balmyle lands within the barony of Balmachreuchie. Just a few weeks later, on 6 April 1670, John, Earl of Nithsdale, succeeded Robert, Earl of Nithsdale, as the new heir to Balmacreuchie, merging it with the expanding Maxwell barony.

On 1 July 1698, John Murray, Earl of Tullibardine, was granted a Crown Charter, which officially acknowledged Balmacreuchie as a barony. It is believed that this John Murray was either the Marquess of Tullibardine, born in 1684, who died in 1709 at the Battle of Malplaquet, or his father, who also held the same title.

On 13 February 1721, David Spalding of Ashintully received a Crown Charter, which confirmed his ownership of the lands and barony of Balmachreuchie. Later that year, in July, he acquired additional lands, including Tullineydies.

By 1771, a tax record shows that James Ferguson’s lands at Easter Balmachreuchie were valued at £34, while Paul Farquharson of Ashintully and Balnabrioch held lands valued at £429. Wester Balcruchie was listed separately, with a value of £46.13.4.

=== 1767–1823 ===
In 1767, Robert Mackintosh purchased key properties, including the barony of Balmachreuchie, from General David Graham. Graham had acquired these lands after they were sold due to legal proceedings involving the Spalding estates. Previously owned by the Spaldings of Ashintully, the properties included areas of Strathardle, Morcloich, and Kirkmichael. On 13 March 1770, Mackintosh completed the transaction, paying £8,900 Sterling. His acquisition also included Meikle Binzean in Glenshee and Glenbeg.

=== 1823–1849 ===
On 20 December 1823, Janet Rutherford was granted ownership of Ashintully and additional lands by Crown Charter. Her possession of these estates was further confirmed on 14 April 1824, when a royal signature recognized her title to the lands and barony of Balmacruckie, which had previously belonged to Andrew Spalding of Glenkilry.

Following her death on 9 November 1849, Rutherford's estate was officially inventoried in 1852 by the Commissary Court of Perth. Her nephew, Roger James Rutherford Aytoun, was recognized as her legal heir on 17 December 1850.

=== Aytoun: 1849–1946 ===
Roger James Rutherford Aytoun succeeded Janet Rutherford of Ashintully as her heir on 12 May 1844. This succession was recorded in the Register of Tailzies on 30 November 1844 and later in the books of Council and Session on 20 December 1849.

Following his succession, Anna Maria inherited the Ashintully lands, including the barony and Ballachraggan in Perthshire. This transfer was recorded in documents from October and November 1872.

Later, Eliza Aytoun inherited the family estates, being formally recognized as her sister’s heir on 5 and 23 May 1923. Her inheritance included the Ashintully and Balmachreuchie estates, as well as the lands of Walton of Blair within the Lordship of Scone.

On 20 August 1941, Elizabeth Aytoun was declared heir to Eliza in the Ashintully lands. By 1946, she, along with Joanna Mary St Clair Aytoun and Dorothy Alison St Clair Aytoun (or Neilson), sold the Ashintully estate to Major Henry Fox Atkinson-Clark.

=== Atkinson-Clark: 1947–2011 ===
In 1947, Elizabeth Ayton and others formally transferred the Ashintully estate, including Balmachreuchie, to Major Henry Atkinson-Clark. According to his will, dated 1 October 1971, the estate was left to his widow, Mrs. Maud Shireff Atkinson-Clark. After her death in 1992, the estate was sold by her trustees to Mrs. Carolyn Steel, Simon Edward Graham Guest, and John Derek Steel.

In 1997, Ashintully was passed to Melanie Jane Palmer and Emma Lucinda Palmer, with the transfer officially registered on 22 January 1998.

== Current status ==
Following the Abolition of Feudal Tenure by the Scottish Parliament in 2000, the barony of Balmachreuchie was separated from the associated lands and became a title in the Baronage of Scotland.
