= Craigie =

Craigie may refer to:

== Places ==
=== Australia ===
- Craigie, New South Wales, see Snowy Monaro Regional Council#Towns and localities
- Craigie, Victoria
- Craigie, Western Australia, a suburb of Perth

=== Scotland, United Kingdom ===
- Craigie, Dundee, a location
- Barony of Craigie, a feudal barony in Dundee
- Craigie (hamlet), Perth and Kinross, a village near Blairgowrie
- Craigie, Perth, Scotland, an area directly southwest of Perth
- Craigie, Ayr, a location in South Ayrshire
- Craigie, South Ayrshire, a small village near Kilmarnock
  - Craigie Castle

== People with the surname ==
- Billy Craigie, Aboriginal Australian activist, one of four co-founders of the Aboriginal Tent Embassy in 1972
- Claude Craigie, Scottish footballer
- Jill Craigie, British writer, filmmaker and actress
- Patrick Craigie (1843–1930), British agricultural statistician
- Pearl Mary Teresa Craigie (1867–1909), Anglo-American writer under pen-name John Oliver Hobbes
- Robert Craigie, Lord Glendoick (1688–1760), Scottish politicians and judge, Member of Parliament for Tain Burghs 1742–1747
- Admiral Robert William Craigie (1849–1911), Royal Navy admiral
- Sir Robert Leslie Craigie, GCMG, CB, PC (1883–1959), British ambassador to Japan 1937–1941
- William Craigie (1867–1957), British lexicographer
