= Cranley Gardens =

Cranley Gardens may refer to the following places in London, England:

== London ==
- Cranley Gardens, Haringey, a location
  - Cranley Gardens railway station, a former station in Muswell Hill, Hornsey
- Saint Peter, Cranley Gardens or Church of St Yeghiche, an Armenian Apostolic Church in South Kensington
