= Cranley =

Cranley may refer to:

Places

- Cranley, Queensland, Australia, a suburb of Toowoomba
- Cranley, Suffolk, a location in England
- Cranley Gardens, London, England
- Cranleigh, a village in Surrey, England, formerly 'Cranley'

People

- Thomas Cranley (1337–1417), a statesman and cleric in Ireland
- John Cranley (MP) of Great Yarmouth (UK Parliament constituency) in 1419
- John Cranley (born 1974), mayor of Cincinnati, Ohio, United States
- Evan Cranley, a Canadian musician in various bands
- Baron Cranley, a past designation of the Earl of Onslow, a UK Peerage title
