= List of listed buildings in Kirkmichael, Perth and Kinross =

This is a list of listed buildings in the parish of Kirkmichael in Perth and Kinross, Scotland.

== List ==
Name	Location	Date listed	Grid ref. (Note: Sometimes known as OSGB36, the grid reference (where provided) is based on the British national grid reference system used by the Ordnance Survey. • "Guide to National Grid". Ordnance Survey. • "Get-a-map". Ordnance Survey.)	Geo-coordinates	Notes	LB number (Note: Historic Environment Scotland assign a unique alphanumeric identifier to each designated site in Scotland, for listed buildings this always begins with "LB", for example "LB12345".)	Image
Middle Balnald				56°43′05″N 3°30′59″W	Category B	11473	Upload Photo
Ashintully Castle				56°44′03″N 3°28′15″W	Category B	11477	Upload Photo
Glenshee Church Churchyard				56°48′52″N 3°27′40″W	Category C(S)	13763	Upload Photo
Balnakilly Limekiln				56°43′24″N 3°31′09″W	Category B	11474	Upload Photo
Dalnagairn Limekiln				56°43′47″N 3°30′26″W	Category B	11478	Upload Photo
Pitcarmick Bridge Over River Ardle				56°41′45″N 3°29′18″W	Category C(S)	11482	Upload Photo
Ballantuim House Hotel, Walled Garden				56°40′38″N 3°27′51″W	Category C(S)	11483	Upload Photo
Kirkmichael And Straloch Session House Etc. (Former School)				56°43′25″N 3°30′16″W	Category C(S)	11471	Upload Photo
Mill Of Dunie Miller's House				56°42′52″N 3°29′23″W	Category C(S)	11476	Upload Photo
Whitefield Castle				56°44′17″N 3°29′22″W	Category B	11481	Upload another image
Manse Cottage, Glenshee				56°48′52″N 3°27′38″W	Category C(S)	11487	Upload another image
Kirkmichael Bridge Over River Ardle				56°43′24″N 3°30′18″W	Category B	11472	Upload another image
Mill Of Dunie				56°42′53″N 3°29′22″W	Category C(S)	11475	Upload Photo
Cray Church Of Scotland (Former Free Church)				56°45′23″N 3°23′47″W	Category C(S)	11484	Upload another image See more images
Dalnaglar Castle				56°45′58″N 3°23′56″W	Category C(S)	11485	Upload another image See more images
Kirkmichael And Straloch Churchyard				56°43′24″N 3°30′13″W	Category C(S)	11470	Upload Photo
Balvarran House				56°44′26″N 3°30′58″W	Category B	11480	Upload Photo
Milton Limekiln				56°43′09″N 3°29′21″W	Category C(S)	11479	Upload Photo
Kirkmichael And Straloch Parish Church				56°43′24″N 3°30′14″W	Category B	11515	Upload Photo
Glenshee Bridge Over Shee Water				56°48′50″N 3°27′40″W	Category B	11489	Upload Photo
Glenshee Church Of Scotland				56°48′53″N 3°27′41″W	Category B	11486	Upload another image See more images
Old Spittal				56°48′59″N 3°27′24″W	Category C(S)	11488	Upload Photo

== Key ==
The scheme for classifying buildings in Scotland is:

- Category A: "buildings of national or international importance, either architectural or historic; or fine, little-altered examples of some particular period, style or building type."
- Category B: "buildings of regional or more than local importance; or major examples of some particular period, style or building type, which may have been altered."
- Category C: "buildings of local importance; lesser examples of any period, style, or building type, as originally constructed or moderately altered; and simple traditional buildings which group well with other listed buildings."

In March 2016 there were 47,288 listed buildings in Scotland. Of these, 8% were Category A, and 50% were Category B, with the remaining 42% being Category C.
