= Pitlochry Church of Scotland =

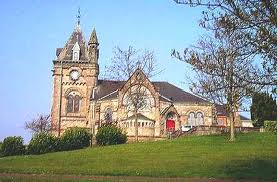
- Pitlochry Church of Scotland

- Location of the church in Perth and Kinross
- 56.7042°N 3.7328°W
- Location: Pitlochry
- Address: Church Road, Pitlochry, PH16 5EB
- Country: Scotland
- Language: English
- Denomination: Church of Scotland
- Churchmanship: Christian, Presbyterian, Reformed
- Website: http://www.pitlochrychurchofscotland.org.uk

Administration
- Parish: Pitlochry

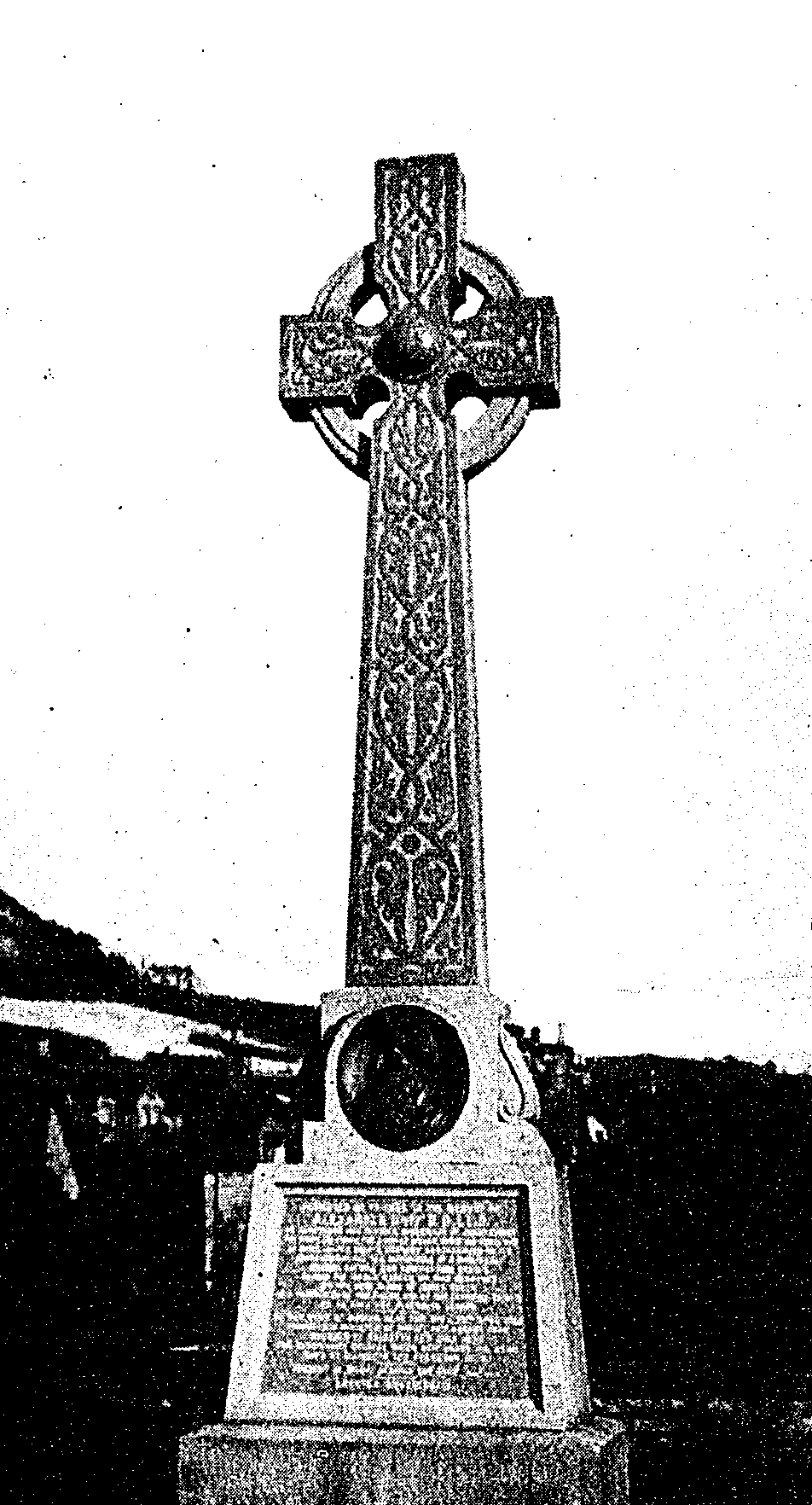
Alexander Duff memorial cross at Pitlochry Parish Church

Pitlochry Church of Scotland is a congregation of the Church of Scotland, a Presbyterian Church. The church building is located in Church Road, Pitlochry, in Perthshire, Scotland. The church today serves the tourist town of Pitlochry in the Tummel valley. The church is a category A listed building.

== History ==
The congregation which today worships in Pitlochry can trace its history back to at least the 7th century when it seems that a church dedicated to St Colm or St Colman was founded. Further evidence of early Christian activity in the area is the Dunfallandy Stone, an 8th-century Pictish stone depicting a Celtic Christian Cross, which was found near Killiecrankie, 4 miles (6.4 km) to the north. but was moved to Dunfallandy farm close to Pitlochry.

The original parish church was at Moulin, just north of Pitlochry, from the Middle Ages. A charter for the church at Moulin together with "three carucates of land" was granted to the monks of Dunfermline Abbey by William the Lion, King of the Scots(1165 to 1214). In 1231, Pope Gregory IX granted the monks of Dunfermline Abbey patronage of Moulin, thus augmenting their income.

A disastrous fire gutted Moulin Kirk in 1873 and, in addition to restoring this building, a new church was erected on a site in Pitlochry offered by Mr Archibald Butter of Faskally. The new church, designed by Dundee Architects Charles & Leslie Ower was complete by 1884, comprising a mixture of Romanesque Architecture and Victorian Gothic and Byzantine features, inspired by the work of F T Pilkington. A monument commemorating Alexander Duff (1806–1878), the first Church of Scotland missionary to India, is situated in the church grounds. A church hall was constructed in 1910.

In 1929, when the majority of United Free Church of Scotland congregations rejoined the Church of Scotland, the Pitlochry United Free Church (which had been consecrated in 1863 as a Free Church and was from 1900 a United Free Church) became known as the East Church and the building currently in use became the West Church. The West Church, because of its prominent position overlooking the village, became affectionately known as "Mount Zion". It was designated as the second parish church of the Parish of Moulin in 1934.

In 1989, Moulin Kirk was closed for worship and in 1992 the congregations of the East and West Churches united to form "Pitlochry Church of Scotland".

== Ministers ==
Moulin Kirk

- Rev Gregor MacGregor (1574–1578)
- Rev Walter Tully (1578 - 1578)
- Rev Duncan M' Lagan (1579–1586)
- Rev John Marshall. M.A. (1588–1590)
- Rev Thomas M' Gibbon (1595–1596)
- Rev John Maclagan (1607–1608)
- Rev William Glas, M.A. (1613–1624)
- Rev William Balnavis, M.A. (1624–1644)
- Rev Robert Campbell, M.A. (1647–1651)
- Rev William Balnavis, (1668–1705)
- Rev James Stewart, M.A. (1707–1735)
- Very Rev Adam Ferguson (1736–1785)
- Rev Alexander Stewart, D.D. (1786–1805)
- Rev David Duff, D.D. (1806–1831)
- Rev Duncan Campbell (1832–1881)

Moulin & Pitlochry West Church

- Rev Duncan Macalister Donald, M.A., B.D. (1882–1926)
- Rev Charles M. Hepburn, M.A., B.D. (1926–1939)
- Rev Donald Fraser Findlay, M.A. (1939–1956)
- Rev John H. A. Wright, M.A., B.D. (1957–1973)
- Rev William G. Shannon, M.A., B.D. (1973–1998) - Mr Shannon remained in the charge until retirement. (Pitlochry West Church merged with Pitlochry East Church in 1991 to become Pitlochry Church of Scotland)

Pitlochry East Church

- Rev William Grant (1844–1849)
- Rev John Stewart (1849–1883)
- Rev Charles Gordon Mackey (1883–1907)
- Rev Archibold J MacNicol MA BD (1907–1926)
- Rev Dr Thomas Crouther Gordon DCF MA BD (1926)
- Rev William Alexander Ross (1926–1958)
- Rev Francis Martin B.L. (1958–1990)

Pitlochry Church of Scotland

- Rev William G. Shannon, M.A., B.D. (1973–1998) - Mr Shannon remained in the charge until retirement.
- Rev Malcolm Ramsay, B.A., LL.B., Dip.Min. (1998–2011) — Called to the parish in 1998. Demitted charge in 2011 to become a Church of Scotland Mission Partner in Nepal.
- Rev Mary M Haddow B.D. (2012 - 2022) — Mary was called to Pitlochry Church of Scotland from Banchory Ternan East Church in 2012.
- Rev Mark M Foster B.Sc., B.D. CertCS (COSCA), CertTM (2024 - current)

One former Pitlochry minister, the Very Rev Adam Ferguson (Moulin Kirk), served as Moderator of the General Assembly in 1772.

== The church today ==
Today Pitlochry Church of Scotland is a thriving congregation with a wide range of activities for all ages. The Mission of the church is "To know Christ and to make Him Known" — "Our aim as God's people in this place, is to serve the Lord Jesus Christ, make his name and love known as widely as possible, and to seek to serve the community in which God has placed us".

In 2024 the congregation was linked with Blair Atholl and Struan Church of Scotland. The most recent minister is the Reverend Mark Foster, who was called to the new charge of Blair Atholl and Struan l/w Pitlochry Church of Scotland in October 2024.

== Services ==
- Sunday Morning Worship Service: 10:00am. Refreshments served after the service
- Prayer Meeting: Wednesday at 10:00 am — in The Tryst

== See also ==
- List of Church of Scotland parishes
