= Duff Memorial Church =

- The church building in 2019, looking southwest
- Duff Memorial Church
- 56°43′21″N 3°30′22″W
- Location: Kirkmichael, Perth and Kinross
- Country: Scotland
- Denomination: Church of Scotland (formerly)

History
- Status: Closed

Architecture
- Functional status: Disused
- Architect(s): L. & J. Falconer
- Years built: 1890 (136 years ago)
- Closed: 1957 (69 years ago)

Duff Memorial Church is a former church building in Kirkmichael, Perth and Kinross, Scotland. It was built in 1890, replacing Kirkmichael Free Church of Scotland.

The church is named for Alexander Duff (1806–1878), Scotland's first missionary to India.

The last church service was held in 1955, two years before its closure.
