= Cray, Perth and Kinross =

Coordinates: 56°45′29″N 3°23′45″W

Cray
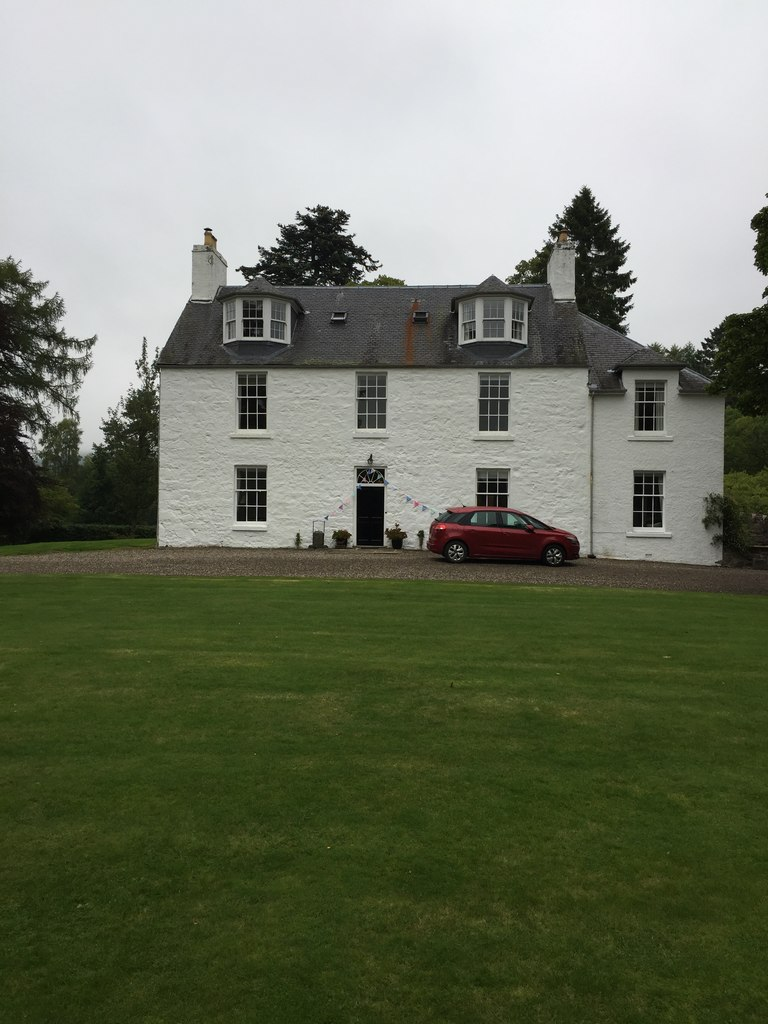
- Cray House, near the bridge over the Black Water River

- Location within Perth and Kinross
- Council area: Perth and Kinross
- Country: Scotland
- Sovereign state: United Kingdom
- Post town: PERTH
- Dialling code: 01738
- Police: Scotland
- Fire: Scottish
- Ambulance: Scottish

Cray is a settlement in Perth and Kinross, Scotland, about 4.5 miles (7 kilometres) northeast of Kirkmichael, on the Shee Water at the foot of Mount Blair.

Cray Parish Church, a Category C listed building dating to 1844, is located on the B591, the main road passing through the area.

Cray House was formerly owned by Rev. H. M. Williamson.
