= Kirkmichael Bridge =

Bridge in Perth and Kinross, Scotland

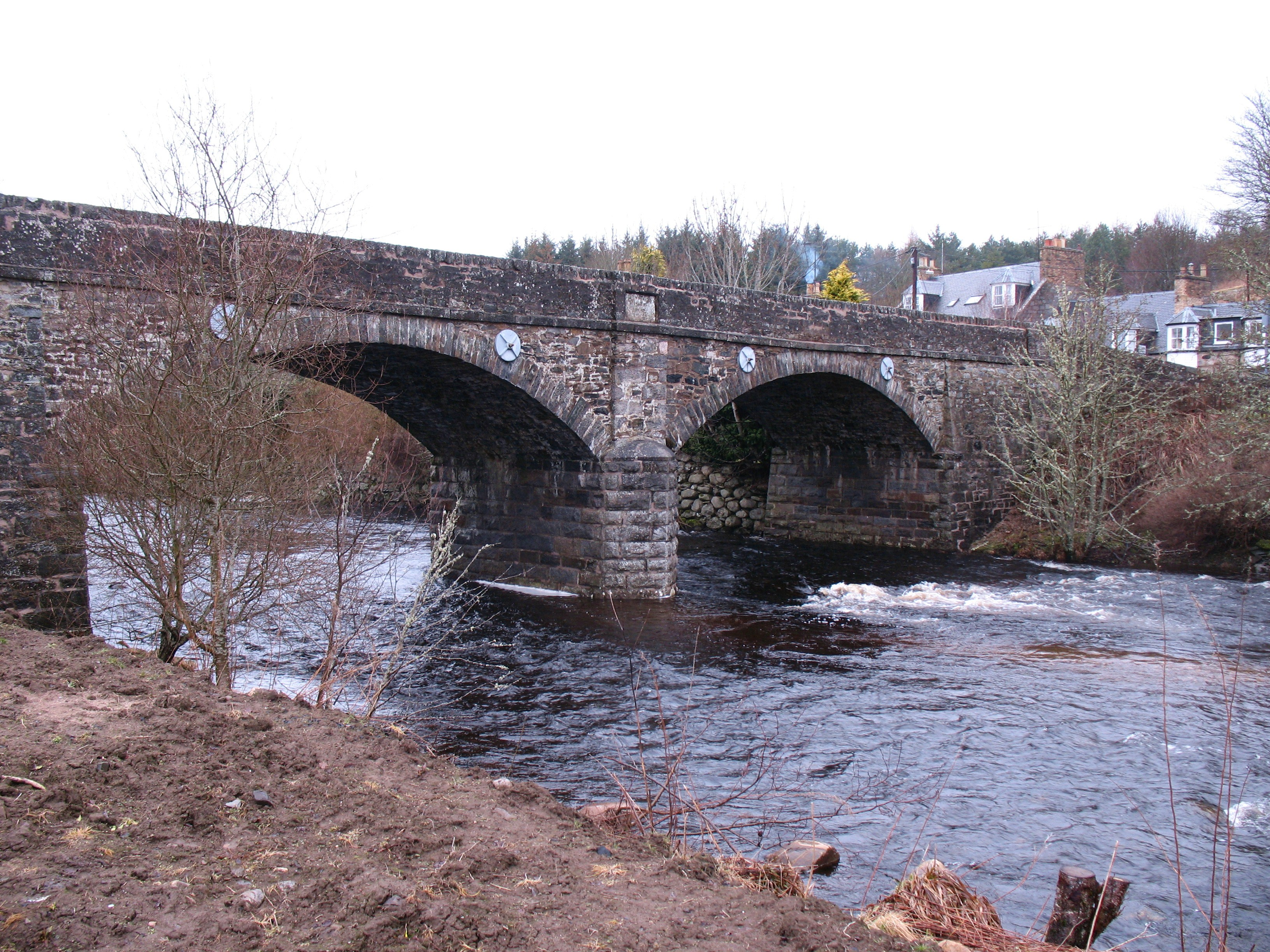
- Looking northwest towards the village centre
- Coordinates: 56.72339°N 3.5049754°W
- Crosses: River Ardle
- Locale: Perth and Kinross

History
- Opened: 1840; 186 years ago

Listed Building – Category B
- Official name: Kirkmichael Bridge Over River Ardle
- Designated: 4 October 1971
- Reference no.: LB11472

Location
- Interactive map of Kirkmichael Bridge

Kirkmichael Bridge is a two-segmental-arched bridge in Kirkmichael, Perth and Kinross, Scotland. A Category B listed structure built in 1840, it crosses the River Ardle, connecting the village centre to the north with the Balnald area to the south. The bridge, which stands just to the north of Pitcarmick Bridge, is toll-free.

The bridge was damaged in flooding in 1847.

== See also ==
- List of listed buildings in Kirkmichael, Perth and Kinross
- List of bridges in Scotland
