= Cranmer Green =

Nature reserve in Mitcham, London, England

Coordinates: 51.398°N 0.161°W

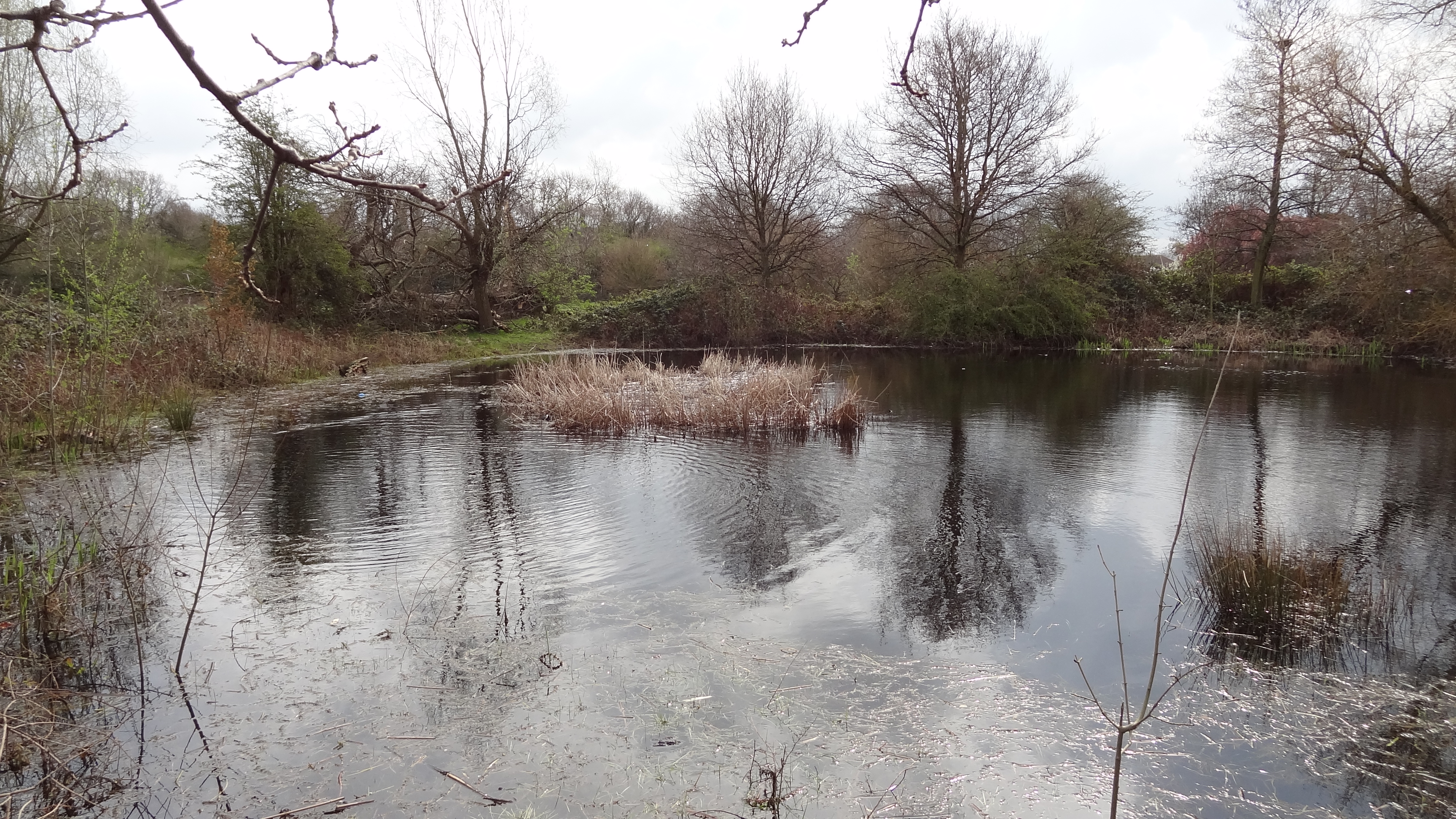
Cranmer Green pond

Cranmer Green is a 3.2 hectare local nature reserve and Site of Local Importance for Nature Conservation in Mitcham in the London Borough of Merton. It is owned and managed by Merton Council. It is a triangular area bounded by Cranmer Road, King George VI Avenue and a railway line.

Cranmer Green, also known as Cranmer Piece, is named after the Cranmer family, who lived locally between 1761 and 1843. The site has a pond, which probably dates to the late eighteenth century, and areas of grassland and woodland.
