= Craig-y-penrhyn =

Village in Ceredigion, Wales

Coordinates: 52°30′58″N 3°59′00″W

- Location within Ceredigion
- OS grid reference: SN 6551 9276
  - Cardiff: 79.3 mi (127.6 km)
  - London: 178.1 mi (286.6 km)
- Community: Llangynfelyn
- Principal area: Ceredigion
- Country: Wales
- Sovereign state: United Kingdom
- Post town: Machynlleth
- Postcode district: SY20
- Police: Dyfed-Powys
- Fire: Mid and West Wales
- Ambulance: Welsh
- UK Parliament: Ceredigion Preseli
- Senedd Cymru – Welsh Parliament: Ceredigion

Craig-y-penrhyn is a hamlet in the community of Llangynfelyn, Ceredigion, Wales, which is 79.3 miles (127.7 km) from Cardiff and 178.1 miles (286.6 km) from London. Craig-y-penrhyn is represented in the Senedd by Elin Jones (Plaid Cymru) and is part of the Ceredigion Preseli constituency in the House of Commons.

== See also ==
- List of localities in Wales by population
