= Craigside =

Village in County Durham, England

Coordinates: 54.714°N 1.807°W

- Location within County Durham
- OS grid reference: NZ125355
- Civil parish: Wolsingham
- Unitary authority: County Durham
- Ceremonial county: County Durham
- Region: North East
- Country: England
- Sovereign state: United Kingdom
- Post town: DARLINGTON
- Postcode district: DL15
- Police: Durham
- Fire: County Durham and Darlington
- Ambulance: North East

Craigside is a small village in County Durham, England. It is situated close to the River Wear, west of Crook.
