= Crahan =

Hamlet in Cornwall, England

Coordinates: 50.1275°N 5.2403°W

- Location within Cornwall
- OS grid reference: SW685303
- Civil parish: Wendron
- Unitary authority: Cornwall
- Ceremonial county: Cornwall
- Region: South West
- Country: England
- Sovereign state: United Kingdom
- Post town: Helston
- Postcode district: TR13
- Police: Devon and Cornwall
- Fire: Cornwall
- Ambulance: South Western

Crahan is a hamlet in the parish of Wendron in Cornwall, England. Crahan is south of Wendron Churchtown.

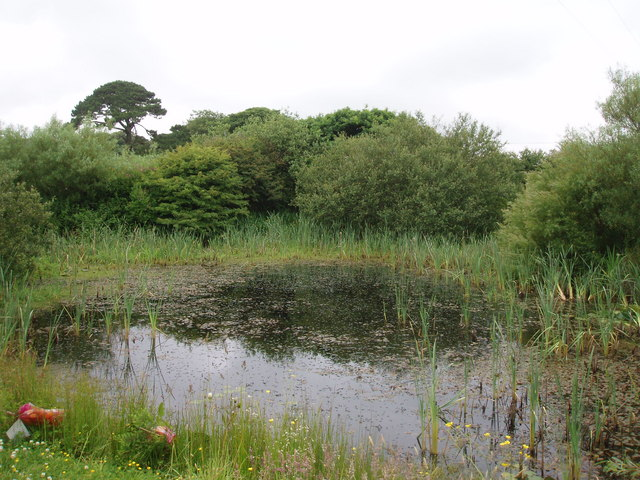
A pond near Crahan
