= Craigerne Residential School =

Craigerne Residential School was a residential school for boys on Edderstone Road in Peebles, Peeblesshire, Scotland, which closed in 1989.

== History ==
Craigerne was opened by Barnardo's as a residential school for boys with emotional difficulties in April 1956. Hundreds of boys went through its doors throughout the sixties and seventies.

In the winter of 1982, the school had a major renovation, with a new assembly hall-cum-gymnasium, and improved classroom facilities, funded by a grant from the Scottish Education Department. There were at the time 25 students.

In 2020, the Scottish Child Abuse Inquiry issued a report which included Barnardo's homes at Tyneholm, Balcary, Glasclune and Craigerne in Scotland. The Inquiry concluded that children in the care of these homes in the 1950s and 1960s suffered emotional, sexual and physical abuse.

== School closure ==
Craigerne closed 7 years after its renovations, in June 1989. The school was purchased by a developer in 2004 and converted into flats. Replacement new oak stairs and paneling to match the original was restored after extensive fire damage.
