= Ashintully Castle =

Coordinates: 56.73464°N 3.47271°W

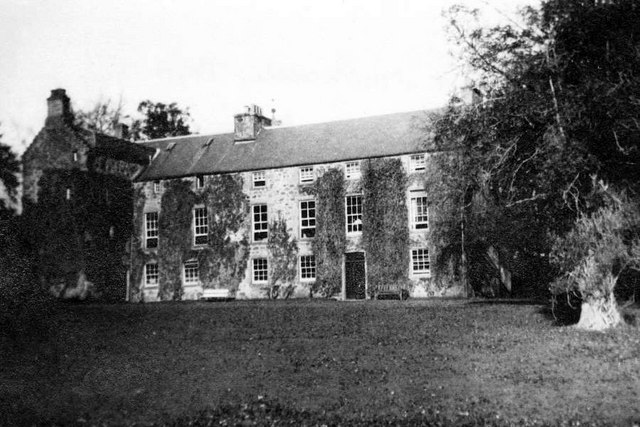
Ashintully Castle Circa 1947

Ashintully Castle, located near Kirkmichael, north of Blairgowrie, in the county of Perthshire Scotland, was built in 1583 as a fortified tower house by the Spalding family; the Feudal Barons of Ashintully. The Spalding Barons were chiefs of the Spalding Clan and followers of the Duke of Atholl, the Chief of the Murray Clan. The Spaldings of Ashintully and their cadet branches were Jacobites, or followers of the House of Stuart. The castle is reached from the B950 road to the Northeast of Kirkmichael. The name Ashintully is an anglicised spelling of the Gaelic Eas an Tulaich and means "cascade of the hillock".

In 1597 the Earl of Atholl and his followers attacked Andrew Spalding at Ashintully, bringing great guns, hagbuts, and pistols and raising fire at the house.

In the mid 19th century it was occupied by R J R Ayton.

== Location ==
- Map sources for Ashintully Castle
