= Clan Spalding =

Highland Scottish clan

- Motto: Nobile Servitium (Service is noble)
- Clan Spalding no longer has a chief, and is an armigerous clan
- Historic seat: Ashintully Castle

Clan Spalding is a highland Scottish clan and sept of Clan Murray. The clan does not have a chief recognised by the Lord Lyon King of Arms so the clan is considered an armigerous clan. The Spalding family lived in Perthshire, Scotland, for one hundred and sixty three years before 1746, and dispersed to Germany, Sweden, Jamaica, Georgia, Liverpool, Virginia, Maryland and elsewhere. The Castle of Ashintully was the clan centre in Perthshire.

== History ==
=== Origins of the clan ===
This name takes its origin from the town of Spalding, Lincolnshire. The name is recorded in Scotland as early as 1294, when John de Spaldyn, 'Magister' (Master) witnessed a grant of lands in Aberdeen. Another Spalding is mentioned as a canon of Elgin Cathedral around 1300. He is probably John de Spauyding, who petitioned Edward I of England in 1304 for timber to build his church at Duffus. The Spaldings came to prominence in 1318 at the siege of Berwick by Robert the Bruce. The story goes that Peter de Spalding, a burgess of Berwick, hated the English governor, and aided the besiegers in taking the town. He was rewarded by Bruce in May 1319 with the lands of Ballourthye and Pitmachie in Angus. He was also granted the keepership of the royal forest of Kylgerry. In 1587 the Spaldings appear in an act of the Parliament of Scotland as a clan for whom their chief, chieftain or captain, would be held responsible. The principal family were the Spaldings of Ashintully.

John Spalding was a lawyer and commissary clerk of Aberdeen in the reign of Charles I. He is the author of a famous historical work, Memorials of the troubles in Scotland and England from 1624 to 1645. His work was originally available only in manuscript form, and was first printed in 1792, then reprinted in 1829. An antiquarian society known as The Spalding Club was founded and named in his honour.

=== 14th century ===
In 1318, Peter Spalding helped followers of Robert the Bruce enter and seize the town of Berwick from the English. He was English and a burgess of the town, but he was married to a cousin of Sir Robert Keith, Great Marischal of Scotland. He was granted lands by Bruce on 1 May 1319 in Ballourthy and Petmethy in Forfarshire (now Angus), together with the Keepership of the Royal Forest of Kilgerry. He also received a flag with a gate upon it, having a portcullis half raised, and the motto "Nobile Servitium".

=== 11th and 16th century ===
Around 1060, King Malcolm III "Canmore", who killed Macbeth in 1057, built Whitefield Castle in Strathardle as a hunting lodge. Over 500 years later, in 1576, Colonel David Spalding led members of his clan to fight in Flanders for the King of Spain. After 7 years, with the resulting plunder, he built Ashintully Castle, 1 km (0.62 mi) to the southeast of Whitefield Castle, which served as a model.

=== 17th century ===
In 1615, David "Dēas" Spalding started the first regular Highlands market place: "Michael Mass Fair". In Gaelic he was called "Daidh Dēas". Dēas required half-a-dozen English words to give the full meaning - ever, or very restless, ready, brave, wise, etc. Dēas means south, and is a relic of Druid sun-worship. Everything, if south or sunwards, was perfect.

But 200 years later, another David Spalding, also Laird of Ashintully, was remembered much more harshly. "He condemned and executed many most unrighteously, particularly a man of the name of Duncan, who was drowned in a sack in what is still called 'Duncan's Pool.'"

=== 18th century ===
During the early 18th century, the family followed the Jacobite cause, lost its lands, and dispersed. Over the years, offshoots of the original Spaldings of Berwick migrated to Aberdeen, Perthshire, Edinburgh, Germany, Sweden, Jamaica, Liverpool, Virginia and Georgia. At least three books have been written about them, by the branches in Germany, Liverpool and Georgia. The Aberdeen branch might be related to the well-known historical society the "Spalding Club" established in 1839.

=== 20th century ===
Flora Spalding, reportedly the last surviving member of the Spaldings of Ashintully and Glenkilrie, Perthshire, dies in West Kensington, London, England on 26 June 1930.

=== 21st century ===
Ashintully Castle, now a 3,000-acre (12 km^{2}) sheep farm and Bed & Breakfast, has been visited by Spaldings from all over the world.

== Clan profile ==
There are several Spalding lineage mottos and arms; however, the principal branch were the Spaldings of Ashintully.

- Spalding of Ashintully's Crest: A gateway Proper with the portcullis half raised, Gules
- Spalding of Ashintully's Arms: Or, a two-handed sword paleways Azure
- Spalding of Ashintully's Motto: Nobile Servitium (Service is noble)
