= Kirkmichael, Perth and Kinross =

Coordinates: 56.724°N 3.505°W

Kirkmichael: Scottish Gaelic: Cill Mhìcheil
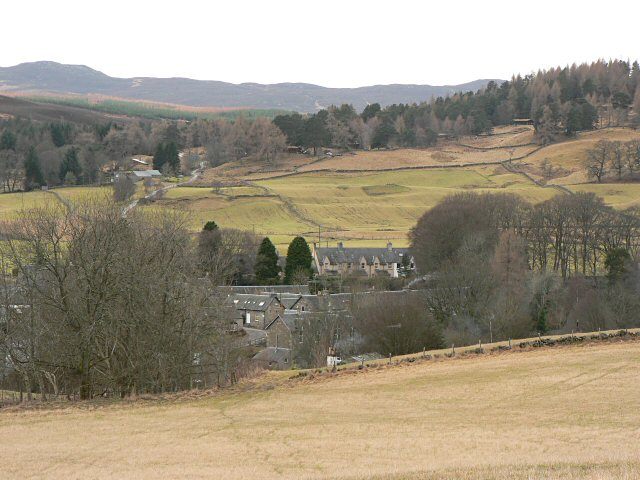
- Kirkmichael seen from the north-east

- Location within Perth and Kinross
- Population: 150
  - Edinburgh: 72 mi (116 km)
  - London: 487 mi (784 km)
- Council area: Perth and Kinross
- Lieutenancy area: Perth and Kinross
- Country: Scotland
- Sovereign state: United Kingdom
- Post town: BLAIRGOWRIE
- Postcode district: PH10
- Dialling code: 01250
- Police: Scotland
- Fire: Scottish
- Ambulance: Scottish

Kirkmichael is a village located in Strathardle, Perth and Kinross, Scotland. It is 13 miles (21 kilometres) north-northwest of Blairgowrie and 12 miles (19 kilometres) east-northeast of Pitlochry on the A924 Bridge of Cally to Pitlochry road, and is linked to the A93 Perth to Aberdeen road by the B950. The village is centred around Kirkmichael Bridge over the River Ardle.

The name Kirkmichael means church of (Saint) Michael; the Gaelic name is Cill Mhìcheil. The village dates back over a thousand years and was at one time an important market in the cattle trade between the Highlands and Lowlands with various drove roads converging on the village. The holding pens were on the rough ground known as the Market Moor near Whitefield and the market itself was on the grass area of Williamston, once common ground but now privately owned. Money traditionally had to be exchanged over running water and this was done at the nearby Sillerburn.

The area became popular as a holiday resort following Queen Victoria's building of Balmoral Castle in nearby Deeside and many of the local shooting lodges, or "big houses" as they are known, were built at that time. Traditionally they were occupied for "the season" of August and September, which included the all-important Glorious Twelfth, when grouse shooting started.

== The village ==
The village is split into two by the River Ardle. On the north side is the A924 (Main Street) with Kirkmichael parish church and graveyard, Session House community centre, Kirkmichael Hotel, shop, garage and traditional properties including the former police station and old dairy dating from the 19th century. On the south side are the primary school, Bannerfield, the fire station, the original part of the village known as Williamston, the village hall, the derelict Free Kirk, more recent properties in Sillerburn Road and Whitefield View, Sillerburn Cemetery, Balnald and Balnakilly. The population is approximately 150.

The original village, known as Williamston, sits above the school on the old road from Blairgowrie to Blair Atholl, which entered the village past the Hall and Old Kirk and exited by the road to Balnakilly. The original inn sat here at the School Corner on the village green which is now private property. The old road now forms part of the Cateran Trail long-distance trail, a circular route taking in Blairgowrie, Bridge of Cally, Kirkmichael, Enochdhu, Spittal of Glenshee, Kirkton of Glenisla and Alyth, which takes around five days to walk.

=== Primary school ===
A residential street near the primary school

Kirkmichael Primary School sits on the south side of the bridge. It was built in 1850 but enlarged in 1877 by James C. Walker and again by Blairgowrie architect Lake Falconer in 1912. The school's catchment area currently incorporates Strathardle, Kirkmichael, Glenshee, Blacklunans, Bridge of Cally and Enochdhu. Until the latter part of the 20th century the catchment area also had schools at Straloch, Ballintuim, Strone of Cally, Blackwater and Glenshee but these are all closed with pupils bussed to Kirkmichael. Pupils continue their secondary school education at Blairgowrie High School. Over its lifetime, the school has been extended from a single-storey to a two-storey building, and in 2007 the new nursery and the primary 1-3 building were added. The grounds contain an all-weather sports court, which is available for public use outwith school hours.

=== The kirks and Session House ===
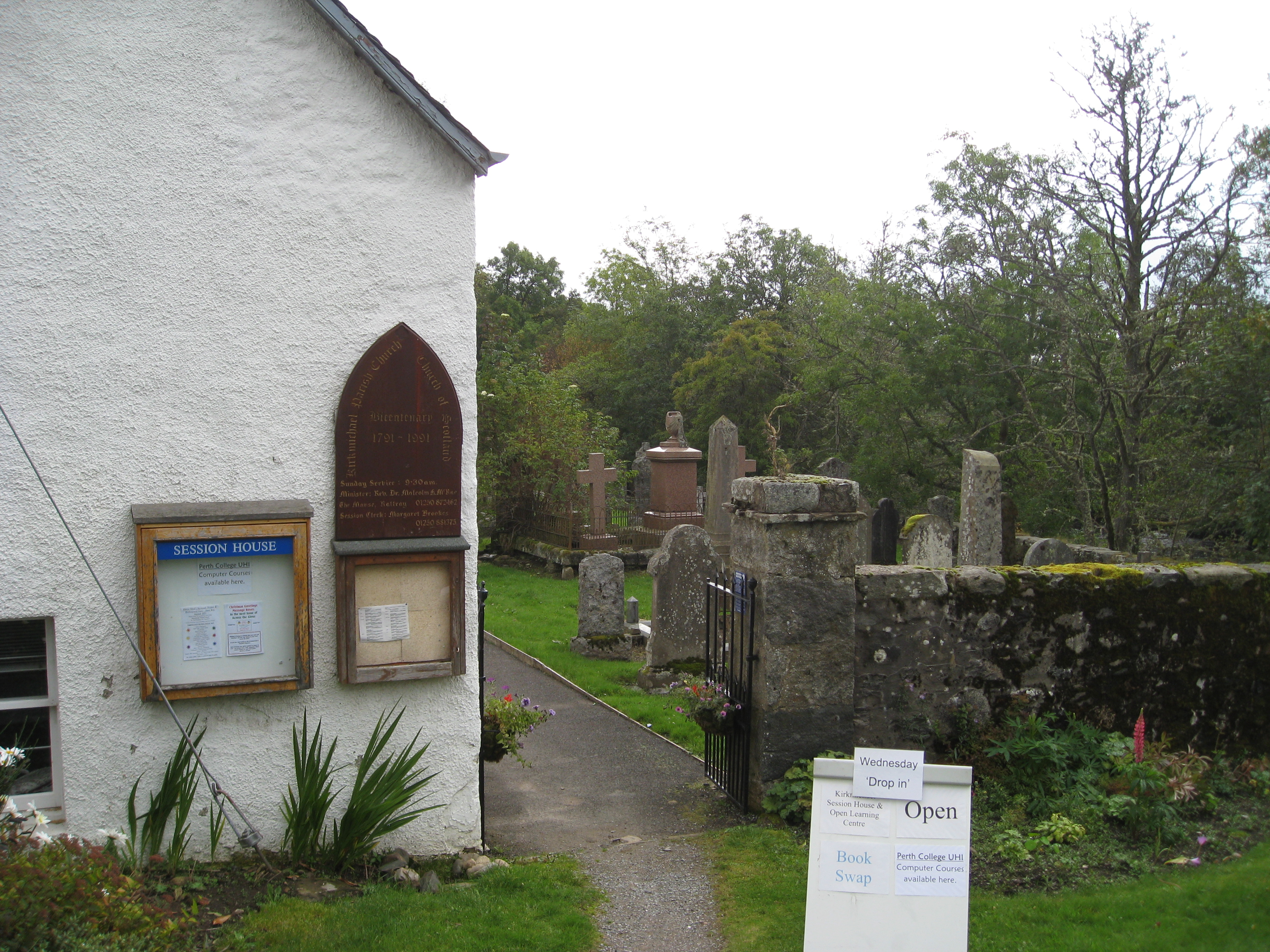
Session House and kirkyard

The former Duff Memorial Church, now derelict

The Church of Scotland parish kirk dates back to the 1791 and is built on a site used for worship for over one thousand years. It is surrounded by the original graveyard which contains graves dating back many centuries. The east end of the graveyard, which does not have headstones or individual graves, is the site of a mass burial plot for the victims of the Black Death plague of 1348 and has never been reopened. Sillerburn Cemetery, on Balnald Road, was opened in the 1950s and, as of 2022, contains around fifty graves. Kirkmichael parish was first linked with Straloch, then with Glenshee/Bridge of Cally and finally with Rattray, with the minister now using Rattray manse. The original manse, opposite the church, was sold in the 1970s and was replaced first by a bungalow in Glenshee then in the 1980s by another bungalow on the Balnald road.

The disused Free Kirk, known as the Duff Memorial Church, was built in 1890 by the breakaway Free Church of Scotland to replace their original church built on the same site in 1856. No one now knows why a replacement was built so soon. In 1928 the Free Kirk amalgamated back into the Church of Scotland, with the two churches being used on alternate Sundays until the Duff Memorial finally closed in the 1950s. It was then used as an agricultural building and in the late 1990s the Village Hall committee had an agreement to acquire the building, restore it to its former glory and provide the village with a 21st-century Community Hall as part of the National Lottery Millenium Hall Scheme to mark the 21st century. However it was put on the open market and sold to a property developer who then found his plan for conversion to a house was impossible, so the old kirk still sits empty and disused and is rapidly deteriorating. The Free Kirk manse became a SYHA youth hostel which for 30 years was very popular with cyclists and hikers until it was sold in the 1950s as a private house. Opposite the Old Manse is a cottage which was originally the parish poorhouse.

The Session House community building is a meeting place for various community groups. Its existence and success owe much to the foresight and tenacity of the parish minister in the 1990s, the Reverend Dr Hugh Ormiston. Originally the parish school and beadle's house it was latterly used as a vestry and Sunday School and was in poor condition before its restoration into the well-equipped building of today. It belongs to the Church of Scotland but is run by a non-denominational management committee.

=== Village shop ===
The village community shop is run by a community-interest company, with local unpaid directors, and incorporates a coffee shop. The adjacent workshop is home to Milford Vintage Engineering, who specialise in the service, maintenance, repair and restoration of vintage and veteran vehicles. The building was erected in 1958 on the site of the disused blacksmith's smithy and garden ground as a sales and repair garage and the shop occupies the former showroom area. At one time Kirkmichael had four shops: one in the house at the school end of Williamston, which closed in the early 20th century, and three in Main Street. One was in the white building now known as MacDonald Cottage which closed in 1983. The two others were side by side in the three-storey building opposite the present shop.

=== Village hall ===
The village hall was opened in 1934 after a period of intense fundraising and is managed by a committee of volunteers. It is used by various local groups including Brownies, Guides, Cubs, martial arts, keep fit, badminton and the primary school for Physical Education classes and is home to local functions. It was comprehensively modernised and refurbished in 2018/2019.

Masonic Lodge Strathardle was restarted in the late 1950s after many years in abeyance and was originally located in the east end of the property known as Meadowside. When Meadowside changed hands about ten years later, the Lodge relocated to the annexe of the hall which it shares with other groups.

=== Fire station ===
The fire station - the third iteration, built in the 1990s - is staffed by a part-time retained crew with a modern appliance. The original 1960s station was a wooden hut adjacent to Riverview containing equipment and a trailer pump with Kirkmichael Garage providing a towing vehicle as required. The second station was on the present site in Bannerfield and was a basic Nissen Hut shed housing a Karrier Gamecock appliance but with no crew facilities. The current station is fitted and equipped to a high standard with office, kitchen and training facilities.

=== Bannerfield ===
In Bannerfield, where the Earl of Mar raised the standard for the Jacobite rising of 1715, Perth and Kinross Council provide car parking, electric car charging points, recycling facilities and a riverside picnic area. The rest of the field is private property and fenced, although there is pedestrian access to the river. It is rented out annually for the Strathardle Gathering Highland Games.

== Historical monuments and memorials ==
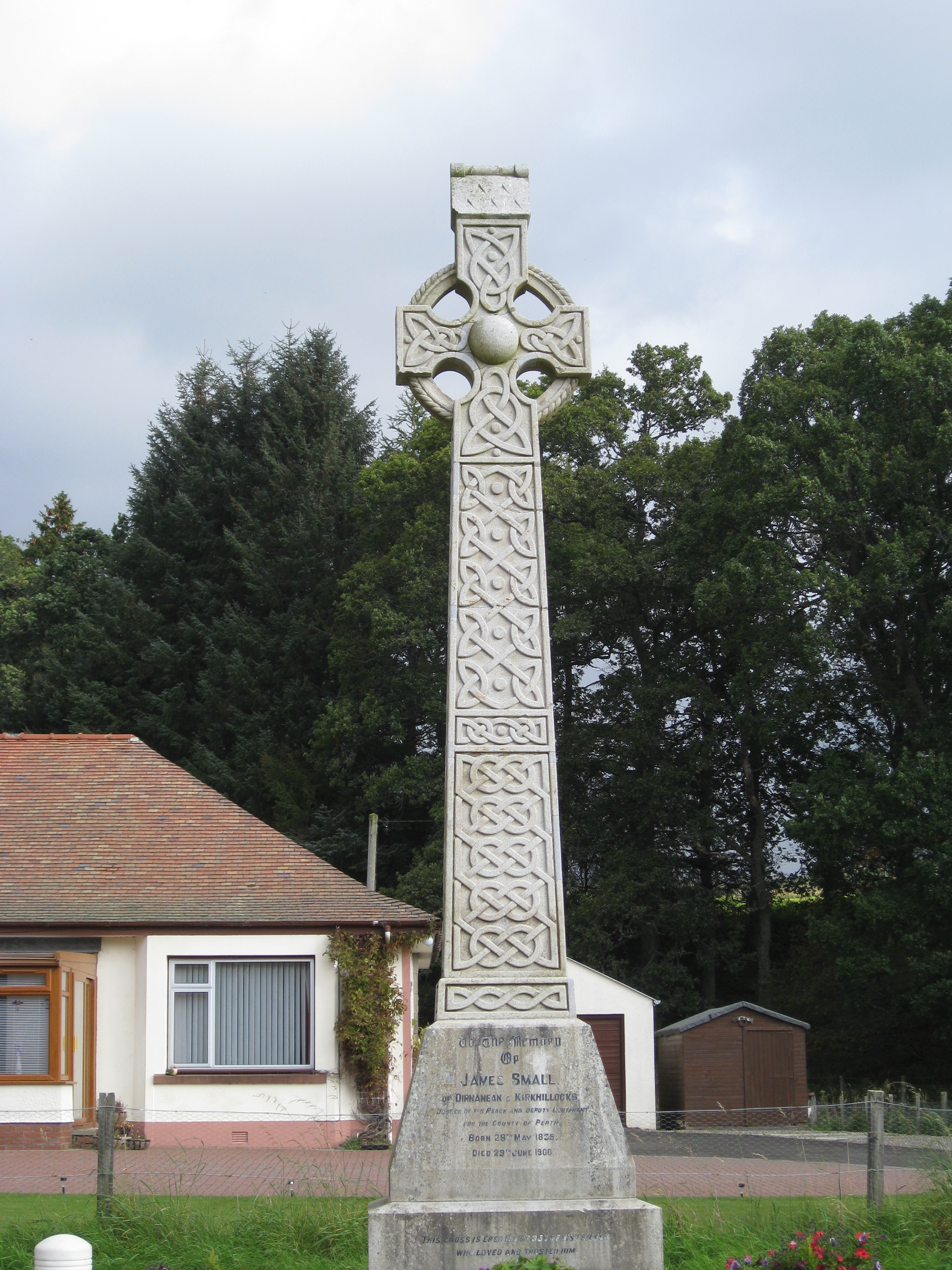
The James Small Monument

=== The War Memorial ===
The War Memorial which was erected after World War One sits above the road between the village and the Strathardle Lodge. Built from stones gathered from the surrounding fields, it is topped by a local granite spire.

At the junction of the A924/B950 sits the James Small (1835–1900) of Dirnanean monument, a highly-ornate Celtic cross erected in honour of a former Deputy Lieutenant of Perthshire.

=== Whitefield Castle ===
Off the footpath from the village to Glenshee lies Whitefield Castle, a ruined hunting lodge built by King Malcolm Canmore in the 11th century. It is well preserved, considering it has had no restoration, and can be clearly seen from the road past the cemetery and the Glen Derby road.

=== The Minister's Well ===
The old roadside water well opposite the church is fed by an underground spring which never runs dry. This was once the village drinking water supply and the water is still fit to drink and very refreshing. Early in the 20th century a water supply was installed which drew water from the Balnald Burn and supplied properties on the Balnald road and in the village. Filtration was basic and the pipes were prone to freezing and in 1970 a modern system was installed by Scottish Water still drawing from the Balnald Burn which over the years has been extended to supply the whole glen including Straloch, Enochdhu, Kirkmichael, Ballintuim and Bridge of Cally villages.

== The Games ==
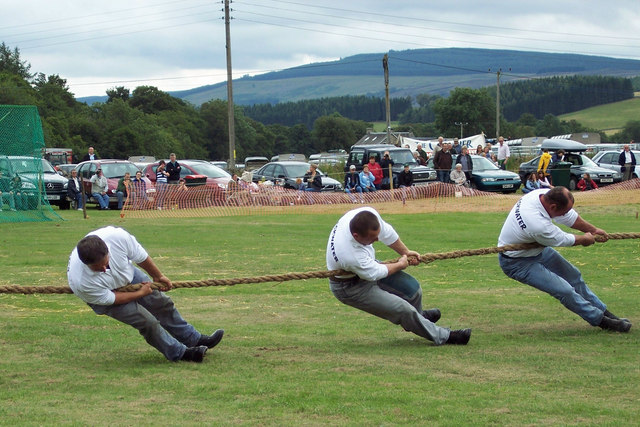
2006 Strathardle Highland Games

Strathardle Highland Gathering & Agricultural Show is held annually in Kirkmichael on the fourth Saturday of August. The Gathering is currently held in Bannerfield with the Agricultural Show in the adjacent field.

The first Gathering was held on 4 August 1871, and it has been held annually ever since, apart from the inter-war years of 1914–1918 and 1940–1945 and due to the coronavirus pandemic in 2020–2021. Locations included Croft of Dounie, Aldchlappie and Dalnagairn before settling on the current Bannerfield location in the late 1940s.

The founders of the original games were Alexander Petrie of Strathgarry, Killiecrankie (originally of Ballinloan, Kirkmichael), "Mr Michie" of Cluneskea, Enochdhu, "Mr James Stewart" and "Mr James Dow". It is recorded that they approached James Small of Dirnanean with a proposal to hold an annual gathering, a proposal to which Small gave his "warm approval". Petrie himself subsequently competed in the games of his own founding, principally via "titling the ring" on horseback.

The agricultural show started in the late 1950s and now attracts a large entry of quality livestock from a restricted local area. For over a century, three generations of the Evans family from Glasgow attended the Gathering with their travelling funfair and sideshows and "Evans shows", as they were known, were an integral part of the Games and village life. In the 1950s and 1960s the fair stayed for two weeks and attracted large crowds with bingo, slot machines and shooting the main attractions. The Evans made their last visit in 2009.

== Sport ==
The local football team, Strathardle United, disbanded with the advent of World War Two but restarted in the 1950s as a boys team with matches played in Bannerfield, with the landowners at the time permitting the public to use it as a park.

A sports committee rented a part of Bannerfield from the 1930s to the 1960s for a challenging putting green and a tennis court. A scout hut was later built on the site of the court.

In 1906, a nine-hole golf course, designed by the Carnoustie professional, opened on Whitefield Moor at the top of Dalnagairn Farm. It closed in 1914 with the start of World War One and never re-opened.

== The Glen ==
Kirkmichael is the largest village in Strathardle. Known locally as "the glen", the strath runs for 13 miles from Glen Brerachean on the Moulin Moors to the confluence of the River Ardle and the Blackwater just east of Bridge of Cally. The Ardle starts opposite the road to Glenfernate, where the Brerachean and the Fernate meet, and is bridged at Enochdhu, Kirkmichael, Pitcarmick, Dalnabreck, Ballintuim, Blackcraig, Cally Lodge and Bridge of Cally. The bridge to Blackcraig is of architectural significance as it has a house built over it. The house on the bridge is one of the glen's best kept secrets. Strathardle is named after a Pictish warrior called Ardle who was killed at Enochdhu in a battle with the Danes in the 12th century. His burial mound in the grounds of Dirnanean Lodge is over twelve feet long but whether he was a giant as reputed or had another warrior buried at his feet is open to conjecture!

Stagecoach buses connect Kirkmichael with Blairgowrie, Tarvie and Spittal of Glenshee. The nearest railway station is Pitlochry railway station (12 miles (19 km)), from where there is direct express service to London, including the Caledonian Sleeper.

== Hotels ==
Originally Kirkmichael had two hotels, the Kirkmichael Hotel and the Aldchlappie Hotel, but over the 20th and 21st centuries this changed regularly. In the 1970s, the Kirkmichael Hotel was split in two, with part becoming the Strathlene Hotel, which in due course became Kirkmichael Apartments. Aldchlappie has largely remained unchanged but changed name to the Strathardle Inn and is now the Strathardle Lodge guest house and cake baking school.

In 1968, the Edelweiss Hotel was built in the style of a Norwegian log lodge on the Glen Derby road and quickly became a popular venue for locals, skiers and night clubbers with buses coming in from Dundee and Perth to the regular functions. Over the years, it too changed names and clientele becoming the Log Cabin Hotel, the Pine Trees, the Valhalla Lodge and (as of 2022) the Kaoglen Lodge.
