= List of listed buildings in Pitlochry, Perth and Kinross =

This is a list of listed buildings in the parish of Pitlochry in Perth and Kinross, Scotland.

== List ==
Name	Location	Date Listed	Grid Ref. (Note: Sometimes known as OSGB36, the grid reference (where provided) is based on the British national grid reference system used by the Ordnance Survey. • "Guide to National Grid". Ordnance Survey. • "Get-a-map". Ordnance Survey.)	Geo-coordinates	Notes	LB Number (Note: Historic Environment Scotland assign a unique alphanumeric identifier to each designated site in Scotland, for listed buildings this always begins with "LB", for example "LB12345".)	Image
146-152 (Even Nos) Atholl Road				56°42′15″N 3°44′15″W	Category C(S)	39865	Upload Photo
156 Atholl Road, Sunnybrae Cottage				56°42′16″N 3°44′19″W	Category A	39866	Upload another image See more images
Atholl Road, Baptist Church With Boundary Walls And Gates				56°42′07″N 3°43′46″W	Category C(S)	47508	Upload Photo
128 - 134 (Even Nos) Atholl Road And Birnam Place, The Arcade				56°42′14″N 3°44′09″W	Category B	47514	Upload Photo
Knockfarrie Road, Knockfarrie Lodge, Including Ancillary Building				56°42′01″N 3°43′24″W	Category C(S)	47522	Upload Photo
Strathview Terrace, Comar House, Including Terrace And Boundary Walls				56°42′20″N 3°44′12″W	Category C(S)	47543	Upload Photo
Strathview Terrace, Pine Trees Hotel, Ancillary Building And Walled Garden				56°42′24″N 3°44′33″W	Category C(S)	47545	Upload Photo
36, 40 And 46 Atholl Road				56°42′09″N 3°43′57″W	Category C(S)	39852	Upload another image
Station Road, Pitlochry Station, Including Down Platform Building, Footbridge, Fountain And Signal Box				56°42′09″N 3°44′08″W	Category A	39867	Upload another image See more images
84 -104 (Even Nos) Atholl Road And Units 1, 2 And 2A Mill Lane, Alba Place				56°42′13″N 3°44′05″W	Category B	47512	Upload Photo
Atholl Palace Hotel, Including Terraced Gardens				56°42′06″N 3°43′11″W	Category B	39856	Upload another image
1 - 4 (Inclusive Nos) Port-Na-Craig Road, Including Boundary Walls				56°41′53″N 3°44′02″W	Category C(S)	39857	Upload another image
Foss Road, Port-Na-Craig House, Including Walled Garden, Gatepiers And Gates				56°41′54″N 3°44′30″W	Category B	39859	Upload another image
Moulin, Kirkmichael Road, Moulin Hotel				56°42′47″N 3°43′37″W	Category C(S)	39862	Upload Photo
Atholl Road, War Memorial And Memorial Garden				56°42′08″N 3°43′57″W	Category C(S)	47510	Upload another image See more images
Bonnethill Road And Toberargan Road, The Bank House, Including Ancillary Building, Gatepiers, Boundary Walls And Railings				56°42′14″N 3°43′54″W	Category C(S)	47516	Upload Photo
Lower Oakfield, Ellangowan And Myrtlebank Cottage, Including Ancillary Building And Boundary Walls				56°42′07″N 3°43′34″W	Category C(S)	47523	Upload Photo
Moulin, Kirkmichael Road, Blairmount With Gatepiers, Boundary Walls And Railings				56°42′44″N 3°43′35″W	Category C(S)	47529	Upload Photo
Perth Road, Dundarach Hotel With Ancillary Building And Gatepiers				56°42′00″N 3°43′38″W	Category B	47533	Upload Photo
1-8 (Inclusive Nos) Rie-Achan Road, Scottish Veterans Garden City, Including Gatepiers				56°42′11″N 3°44′33″W	Category C(S)	47539	Upload Photo
Toberargan Road, Toberargan House				56°42′13″N 3°43′52″W	Category C(S)	47548	Upload Photo
Port-Na-Craig, Suspension Bridge				56°41′55″N 3°43′57″W	Category B	39858	Upload another image
Atholl Palace Hotel, Corrie House				56°42′04″N 3°43′13″W	Category C(S)	47506	Upload Photo
Atholl Road, Fisher's Hotel, Including Glasshouses, Boundary Walls, Gatepiers, Gates And Railings				56°42′11″N 3°44′05″W	Category C(S)	47509	Upload another image
26 Atholl Road, Public Library And Council Offices, Former Union Bank, With Boundary Walls				56°42′08″N 3°43′51″W	Category B	47511	Upload Photo
Knockard Road, Dun-Donnachaidh With Ancillary Building, Boundary Walls And Gatepiers				56°42′21″N 3°43′46″W	Category C(S)	47520	Upload Photo
Knockfarrie Road, Easter Knockfarrie, Wester Knockfarrie And Knockfarrie Cottage, Including Ancillary Building And Terrace Walls				56°42′02″N 3°43′20″W	Category C(S)	47521	Upload Photo
Moulin, Baledmund Road, Bridge Over Moulin Burn				56°42′48″N 3°43′38″W	Category C(S)	47526	Upload Photo
Perth Road, Blair Athol Distillery, Manager's House, Former Manse				56°41′58″N 3°43′21″W	Category C(S)	47531	Upload Photo
Perth Road, Blair Athol Distillery Including Boundary Walls				56°41′55″N 3°43′23″W	Category B	47532	Upload Photo
Church Road, Pitlochry Parish Church, Including Celtic Cross Memorial				56°42′15″N 3°43′58″W	Category A	39850	Upload another image
Moulin, Moulin Church (Church Of Scotland) With Graveyard, Gates, Gatepiers And Graveyard Walls				56°42′45″N 3°43′34″W	Category B	39860	Upload Photo
124 And 126 Atholl Road				56°42′14″N 3°44′09″W	Category C(S)	47513	Upload Photo
Lower Oakfield And Toberargan Road, Inveresk				56°42′07″N 3°43′46″W	Category C(S)	47525	Upload Photo
Tummel Garry Hydro Electric Scheme, Pitlochry Power Station And Dam, Including Boundary Walls				56°41′56″N 3°44′24″W	Category A	47534	Upload another image See more images
Port-Na-Craig Road, Fonab House, Including Ancillary Buildings, Walled Garden, Gatepiers And Boundary Walls				56°41′51″N 3°43′49″W	Category B	47537	Upload Photo
Strathview Terrace, Pine Trees Hotel, Coach House				56°42′26″N 3°44′34″W	Category B	47546	Upload Photo
Atholl Road And Cloichard Place, The Old Smithy				56°42′16″N 3°44′17″W	Category B	39853	Upload another image See more images
Perth Road, Holy Trinity Episcopal Church Including, Church Hall, Lychgate, Graveyard And Boundary Walls				56°42′00″N 3°43′25″W	Category B	39854	Upload Photo
2 East Moulin Road, Birchwood Hotel, Including Boundary Walls				56°42′05″N 3°43′28″W	Category B	47517	Upload Photo
Golf Course Road, Torrdarach Hotel, Including Ancillary Building, Boundary Walls And Gatepiers				56°42′23″N 3°44′17″W	Category C(S)	47518	Upload Photo
Moulin Hall				56°42′44″N 3°43′32″W	Category C(S)	47528	Upload Photo
Moulin, Moulin Square, Bruach Fuarain				56°42′46″N 3°43′33″W	Category C(S)	47530	Upload Photo
Strathview Terrace, Pine Trees Hotel, Lodge House, Gatepiers, Gates And Boundary Walls				56°42′22″N 3°44′25″W	Category C(S)	47547	Upload Photo
West Moulin Road, Town Hall, Including Boundary Walls				56°42′17″N 3°44′01″W	Category B	47549	Upload another image
Atholl Palace Hotel, The Lodge, Including Gatepiers, Gates And Boundary Walls				56°42′02″N 3°43′26″W	Category B	47507	Upload Photo
Auchnahyle Steading And Horse Mill				56°42′21″N 3°43′01″W	Category B	47515	Upload Photo
Higher Oakfield, Knockendarroch House Hotel				56°42′13″N 3°43′38″W	Category C(S)	47519	Upload Photo
Lower Oakfield, Yeomans, Including Ancillary Buildings, Boundary Walls And Gate				56°42′07″N 3°43′33″W	Category C(S)	47524	Upload Photo
Moulin, Baledmund Road, Old Mill				56°42′51″N 3°43′37″W	Category B	47527	Upload Photo
Port-Na-Craig Road, Ferryman's Cottage, Including Boundary Walls				56°41′54″N 3°44′00″W	Category B	47535	Upload another image
Port-Na-Craig Road, Fonab Coach House				56°41′52″N 3°43′53″W	Category B	47536	Upload Photo
West Moulin Road, Wellwood, Including Boundary Walls And Gatepiers				56°42′20″N 3°44′05″W	Category C(S)	47550	Upload Photo
Strathview Terrace, Pine Trees Hotel Formerly Tom-Na-Monachan				56°42′24″N 3°44′33″W	Category C(S)	50603	Upload Photo
51 Atholl Road Including Ancillary Building				56°42′09″N 3°43′58″W	Category C(S)	39851	Upload another image
Moulin, Manse Road, Old Moulin (Formerly Manseholm), Including Boundary Walls And Gates				56°42′47″N 3°43′25″W	Category C(S)	39863	Upload Photo
Port-Na-Craig Road, Portnacraig Inn, Including Boundary Walls				56°41′55″N 3°44′03″W	Category B	47538	Upload another image
Strathview Terrace, Craigard, Including Terrace And Boundary Walls				56°42′19″N 3°44′09″W	Category C(S)	47544	Upload Photo

== Key ==
The scheme for classifying buildings in Scotland is:

- Category A: "buildings of national or international importance, either architectural or historic; or fine, little-altered examples of some particular period, style or building type."
- Category B: "buildings of regional or more than local importance; or major examples of some particular period, style or building type, which may have been altered."
- Category C: "buildings of local importance; lesser examples of any period, style, or building type, as originally constructed or moderately altered; and simple traditional buildings which group well with other listed buildings."

In March 2016 there were 47,288 listed buildings in Scotland. Of these, 8% were Category A, and 50% were Category B, with the remaining 42% being Category C.
