= John Leonard (architect) =

English architect, born 1857

- Leonard designed part of Pitlochry's Holy Trinity Church, the kirkyard of which is now his resting place
- Born: 1857; Berwick-upon-Tweed, England
- Died: 6 November 1932 (aged 74–75); Glasgow, Scotland
- Occupation: Architect

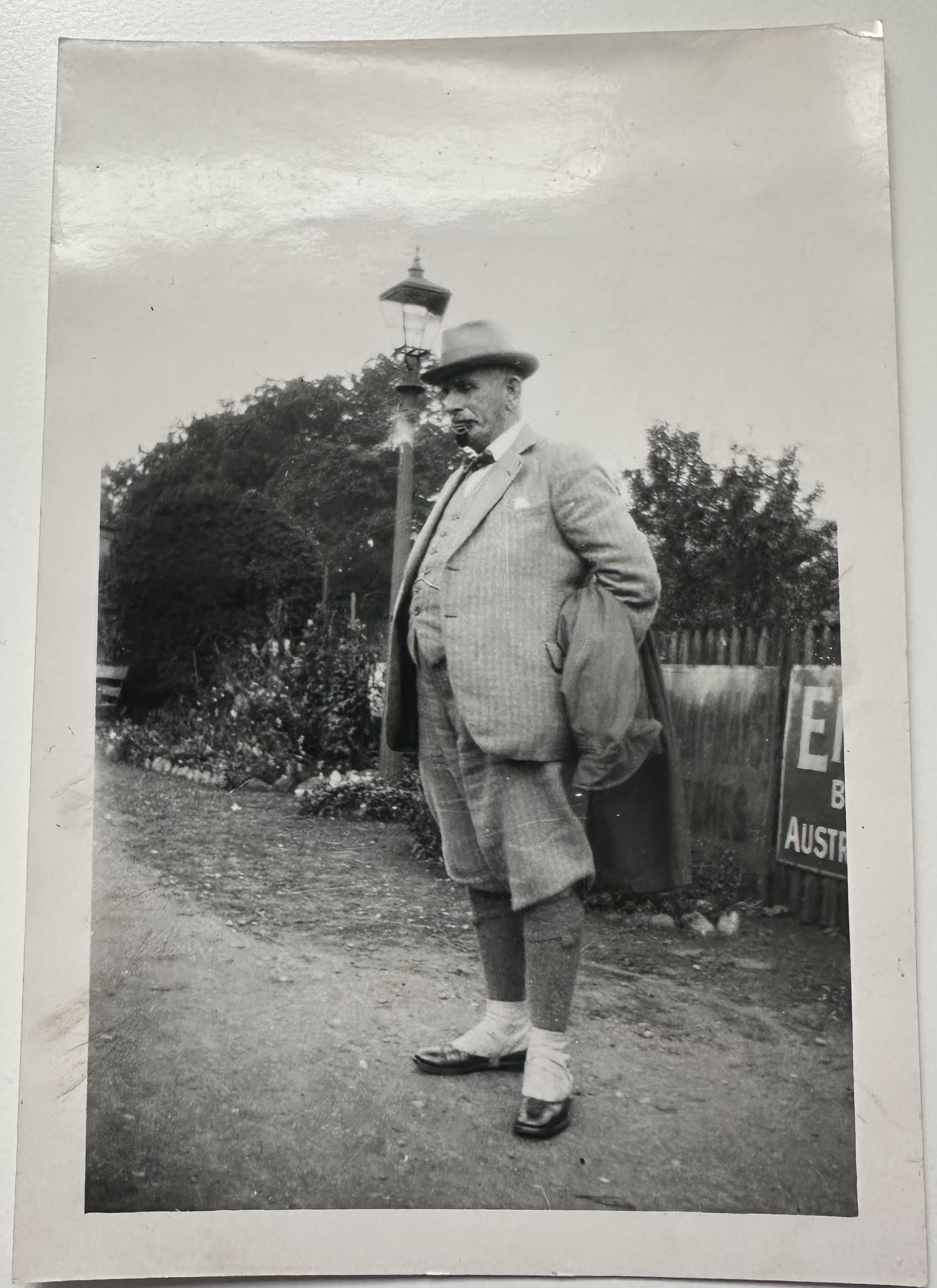
Leonard at Pitlochry Station in 1930

John Leonard (1857 – 6 November 1932) was an English architect. He designed several notable buildings in Scotland, mostly in the Pitlochry area of Perthshire, several of which are now listed buildings.

== Career ==
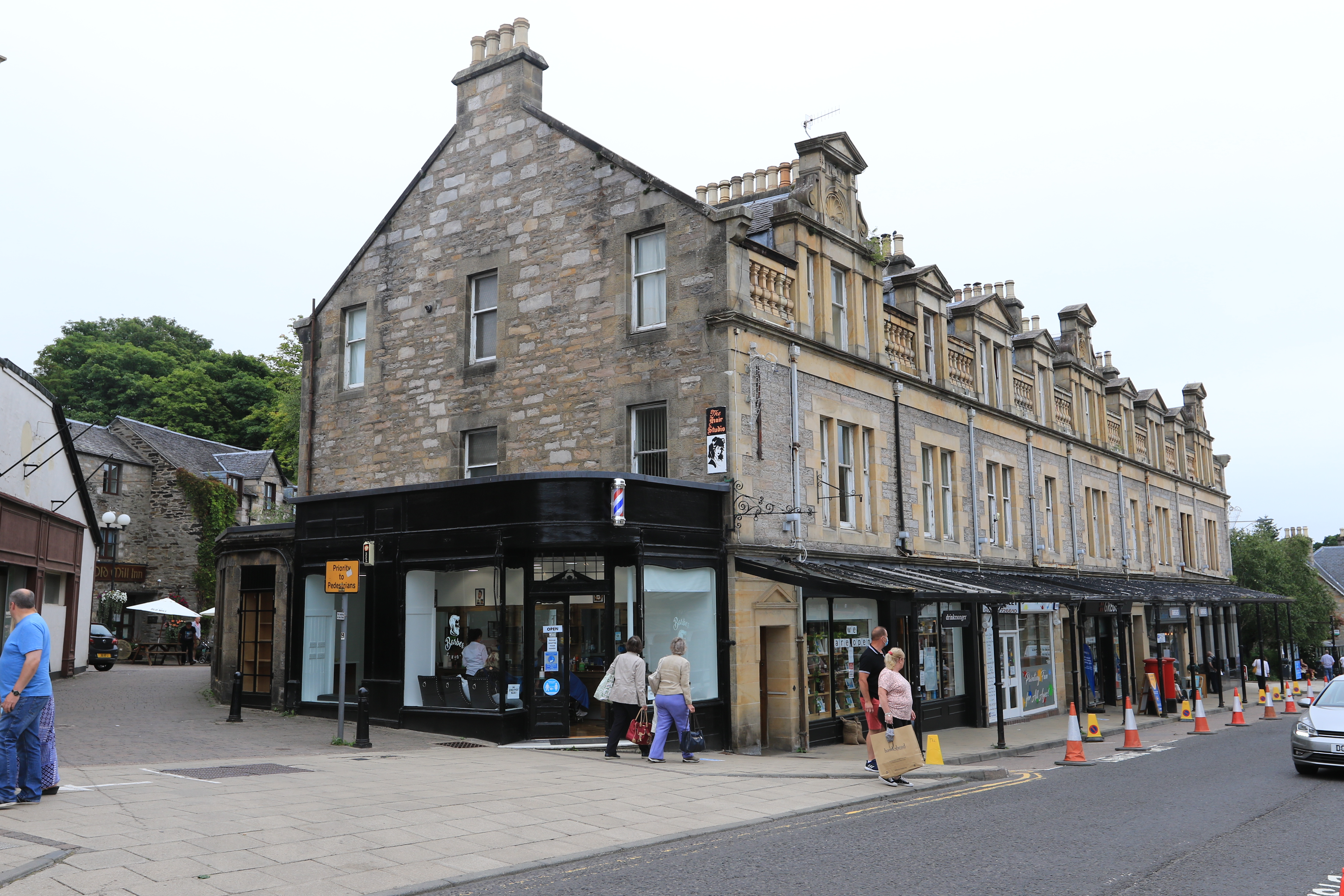
84–104 Atholl Road, pictured in 2020

Leonard practised in Pitlochry as an architectural surveyor. He later formed a partnership, Leonard & Morris, with David Morris, of Echt, Aberdeenshire. From around 1908 they had an office in Bank Street, Aberfeldy, Perthshire. One of their works, St Helen's Villa, on Taybridge Drive in Aberfeldy, was part of a townscape analysis by Perth and Kinross Council in 2008.

=== Notable works ===
- Holy Trinity Church, Pitlochry (1889) – southwest bay, chancel and vestry; now Category B listed

(1902) – built church hall; converted vestry to organ chamber and built a new vestry

- 84–104 Atholl Road, Pitlochry (1897) – now Category B listed
- Torrdarrach Hotel (1901) – now Category C listed
- Dundarrach Hotel (1902) – addition; now Category B listed

(1910) – minor alterations

In 1898, Pitlochry Public Hall, as it was originally known, was the subject of a design competition won by Dundee architect Alexander Ness, ahead of another Pitlochry architect, John Menzies. Leonard placed third.

In 1902, Leonard was involved in a lawsuit, on behalf of the pursuer Thomas Russell, against "Mrs Jane Blair or Menzies and others, trustees and executors of the late Adam Menzies, plumber, Pitlochry", for the non-fulfilment of a contract for plumbing work. The following March, the Perth sheriff found in favour of the defence, and stated that they were "entitled to expenses on the higher scale". The verdict was appealed in July, but was upheld.

== Personal life ==
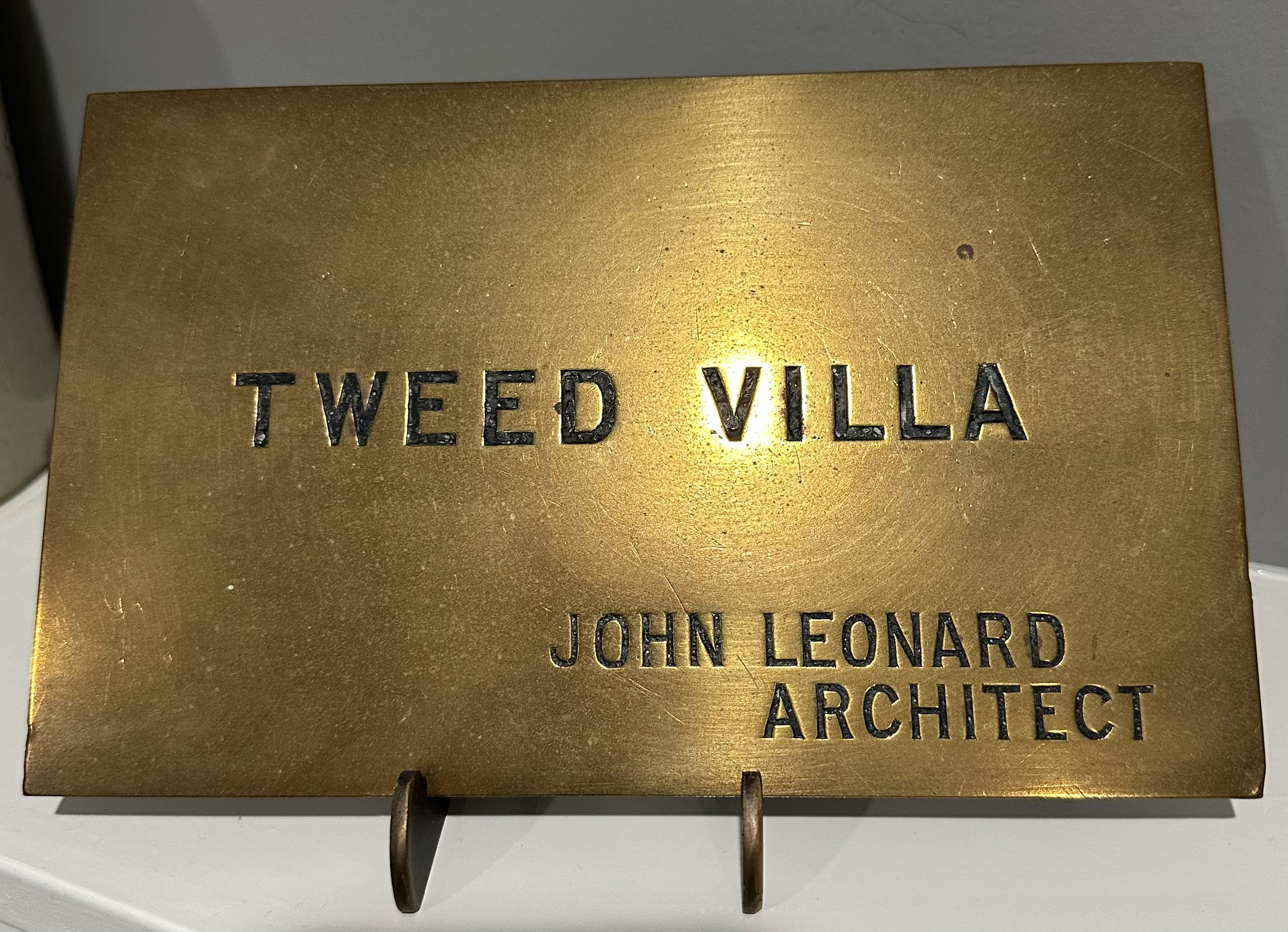
Tweed Villa plaque

Leonard was born in Berwick-upon-Tweed in 1857. He lived on Tweed Street, and later named his home in Moulin "Tweed Villa". In 1895, he married Catherine McDonald (1852–1921), from Blair Atholl in Perthshire. It was his second marriage, his first being to Grace Hopper in 1888.

=== Death ===
Leonard died on 6 November 1932 in Glasgow, aged 74 or 75. He is interred in the kirkyard of Pitlochry's Holy Trinity Church, which he partly designed.
