= Alexander Stewart (minister) =

Scottish Presbyterian minister

Personal details
- Born: 25 September 1794 Moulin, Perthshire
- Died: 5 November 1847 (aged 53)

Alexander Stewart (25 September 1794 - 5 November 1847) was a Scottish preacher with the Free Church of Scotland. He was born in Perthshire, educated at Glasgow and preached at Cromarty.

== Early life and education ==
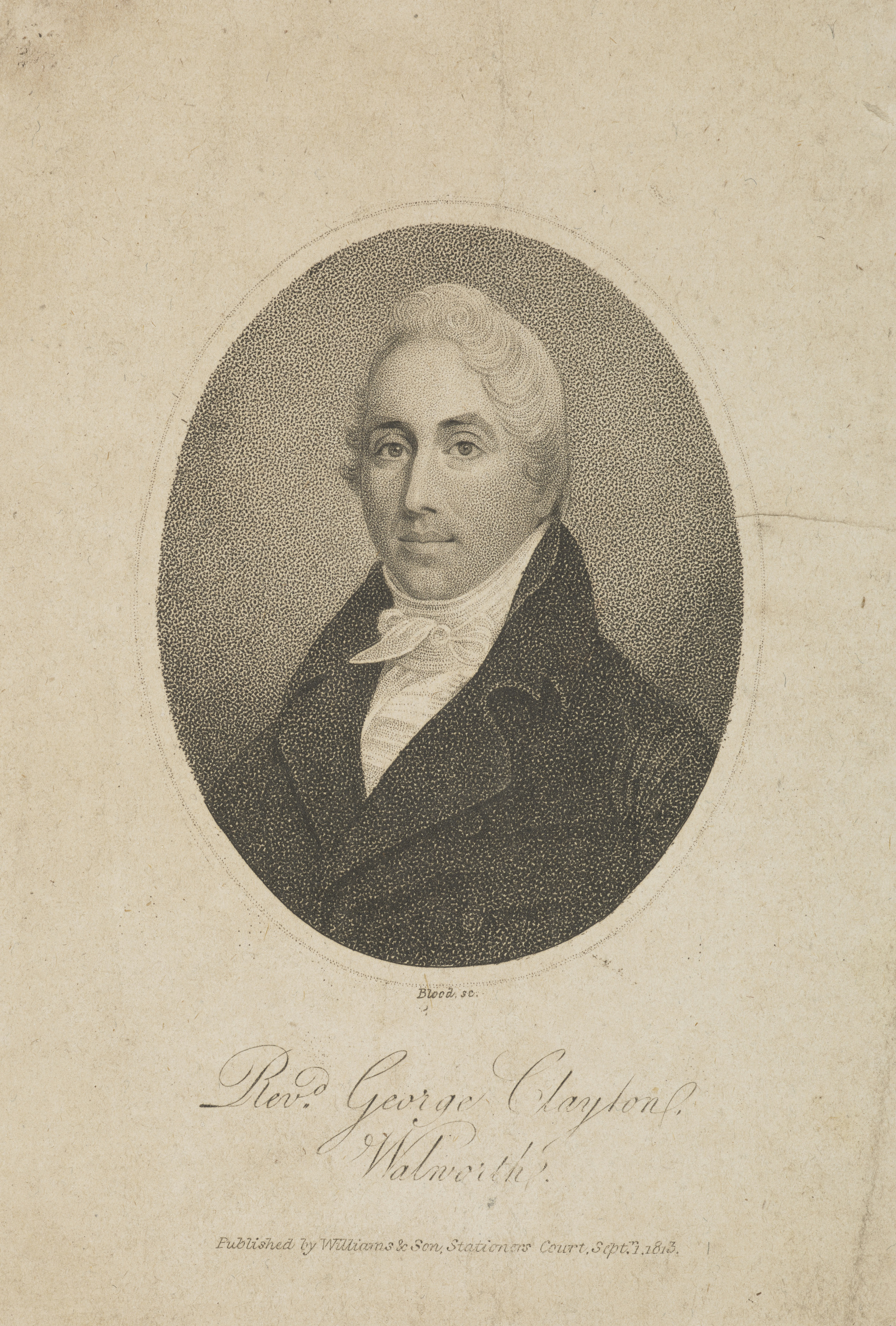
"Rev George Clayton, 1783-1862, minister of Walworth", from National Galleries Scotland

Alexander Stewart was the son of Alexander Stewart, Church of Scotland minister at Moulin, Perthshire and he was born at the manse in Moulin, on 25 September 1794. At the age of four his mother died, and he and his sister went on to live with a new stepmother and eight younger siblings.

Stewart was educated in the Moulin Parish School, and thereafter at the Tain Academy. Subsequently, he became a student of King's College, Aberdeen, where he continued for two sessions. Then, being considered sufficiently educated for entering on the business of life in the line chosen for him, he first became a clerk in a house at Perth, and thereafter in a house in London. While in London, he attended the ministry of Mr George Clayton, under whose ministry he is reported to have been influenced. Stewart decided to study for the ministry of the church while in London.

Stewart's paternal aunt was a resident in Glasgow, so he travelled there, and was enrolled as a student at the University of Glasgow. During his course there he sought no distinction, but shrank instinctively, from any notice of a public kind which at any time was taken of him. In the Divinity Hall, as a student with Dr M'Gill, he was more especially noticed.

From the date of his first appearance in the pulpit, he became eminent as a preacher. The attention of the first ministers of his time was attracted to him. It was well known by his contemporaries that Thomas Chalmers, after hearing him, was so impressed with his preaching, that he used every influence with him to gain his consent to be nominated as his successor in the church and parish of St John's, Glasgow, from which he was about, himself, to be removed to the Moral Philosophy Chair, St Andrews.

== Church of Scotland ministry ==
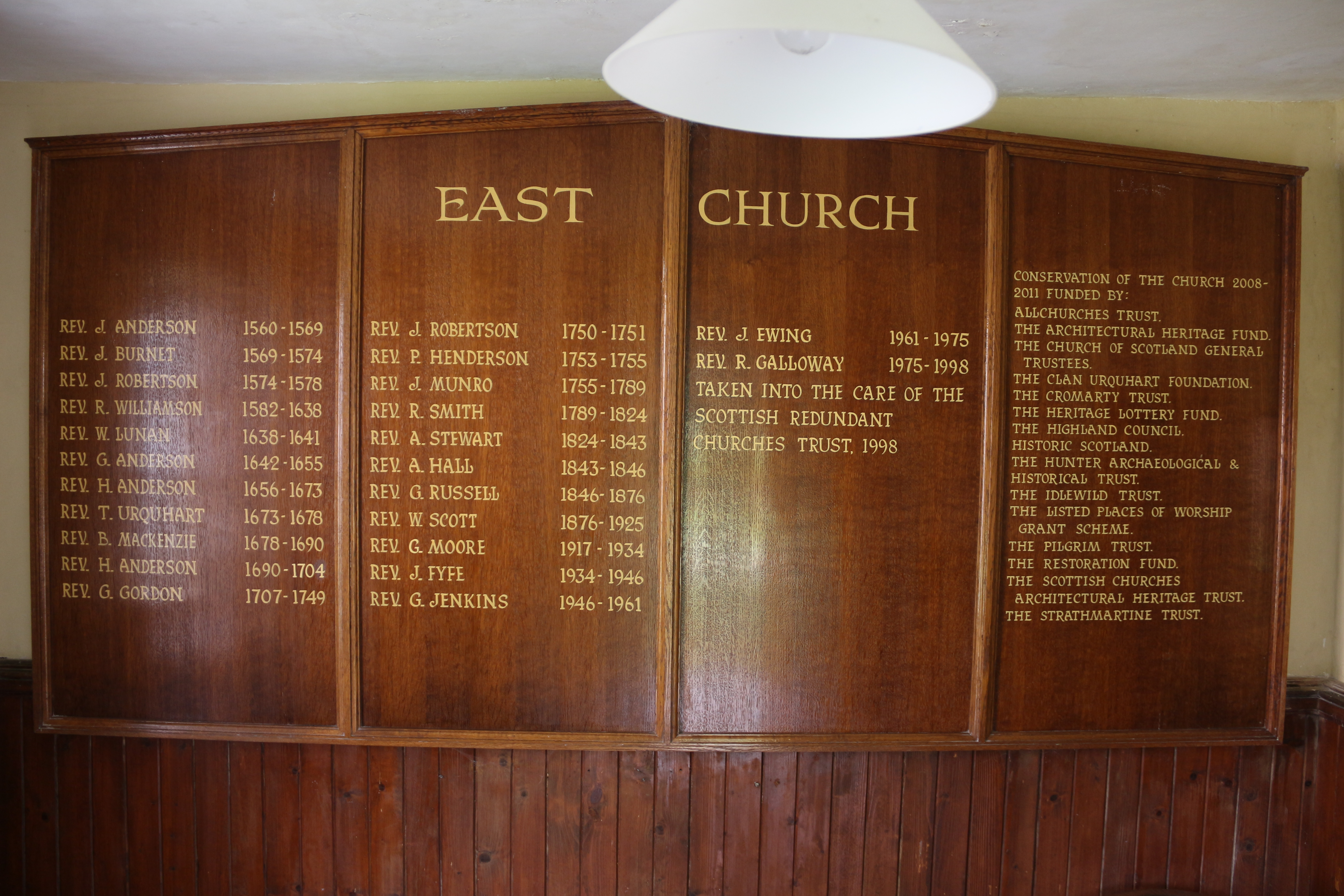
East Parish Church, Cromarty

Stewart was licensed to preach by Presbytery of Lorn in 1822. In November 1823 he was chosen to be the minister of the Chapel of Ease, Rothesay, where the Sabbath services were half in Gaelic and half in English. He was subsequently ordained to the Chapel-of-Ease, Rothesay, on 10 February 1824. He was presented by George IV. in June, translated, and admitted to Cromarty on 23 September 1824. At Cromarty he was not required to preach in Gaelic, but as the town is situated in a Highland district, and as he was there in charge of a large Highland population, his knowledge of the language was reported to be of much value. Hugh Miller was one of his parishioners there.

== Cromarty Free Church ministry ==
Stewart continued as minister of Cromarty till his death. At the Disruption he abandoned his connection with the State, abjuring the new ecclesiastical Establishment. He never made himself prominent in the discussions which, in his time filled the land. Beith reports that his local influence was great. Speeches by him in his Presbytery and Synod were described, says Beith, by those who heard them as something unlike an that other men had ever spoken. But on no occasion during his ministry did he open his mouth in the General Assembly of the Church. He did not feel it to be required. He did not think it would have been useful.

== Call to Edinburgh and death ==
On the death of Thomas Chalmers of New College, Rev Robert Smith Candlish was appointed to replace him. This left Candlish's congregation of Free St George's, Edinburgh without a full time minister. The congregation was summoned for 22 September, and with equal unanimity agreed to call Mr. Stewart to be their pastor. From the first Mr. Stewart regarded the call with alarm. He was of the opinion that a great city congregation was not his proper sphere of labour; and he dreaded a severance from Cromarty.

From the first, dark forebodings possessed him. He wrote to Alexander Beith, who had sought to aid St George's in obtaining his consent to come, — " I feel as if destitute of the faculties for dealing with men. I ought to have been a monk in a cloister, dealing with books and systems; among living people I feel myself powerless as a child." To one of his own office-bearers he said, — "I see a dark lurid cloud hanging over me; but I can discover, I think, a bright spot beyond it."

One of the Commissioners from the south went to Cromarty to prosecute the Call, and said to Mr. Stewart, on leaving the Presbytery meeting-place, "You look as if you were carrying a mountain on your back." Stewart replied — " No, I am not carrying a mountain, but I am carrying my gravestone on my back."

Yet he had resolved to accept the call, saying to friends who were discouraging him from facing a difficult position — "Will I not be more useful in Edinburgh, though I were to live there only three months, than if I remained in Cromarty three years indulging my own ease and feelings, while God forsook me because I forsook both Him and the call of duty."

Stewart died before he could take up his new post, passing away on Friday, 5 November 1847. He is reported to have had a fever; the stress of the recent call may have been an influential factor. He was buried between the doors of the Free Church in Cromarty.

== Works ==
- The Tree of Promise (Edinburgh, 1864)
- Man's, Redemption, the Joy of Angels, a sermon on 1 Peter i. 12 (Precious Seed Discourses) (Edinburgh, 1877)
- The Mosaic Sacrifices (Edinburgh, 1883)

== Family ==
Alexander Stewart was the son of Alexander Stewart, Church of Scotland minister (Canongate Edinburgh), who himself was a son of Alexander Stewart, Church of Scotland minister (Blair Athole).

He died unmarried. A maternal aunt, the widow of a minister, was in charge of the domestic affairs of the manse at Cromarty.
