= Sunnybrae Cottage =

Building in Pitlochry, Scotland

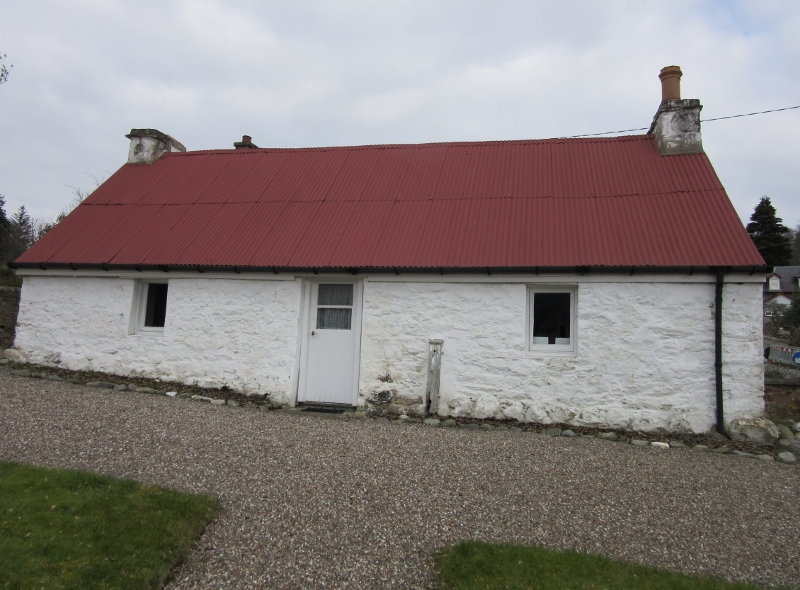
- The cottage in 2015
- Interactive map of Sunnybrae Cottage
- 56.70466°N 3.7389°W
- Location: Pitlochry; Perth and Kinross; Scotland

History
- Built: late 18th or early 19th century

Listed Building – Category A
- Designated: 10 July 1991
- Reference no.: LB39866

Sunnybrae Cottage is a building in the Scottish town of Pitlochry, Perth and Kinross. A Category A listed cottage dating from the late 18th or early 19th century, but incorporating earlier materials, it stands at the corner of Atholl Road and Larchwood Road. It was Category B listed until 1998 and was formerly a scheduled monument. Its scheduled status was removed in 2013. It is a rare surviving example of a cruck-framed thatched cottage, and is in the care of Historic Environment Scotland.

The corrugated iron roof was installed over its thatched roof.

In 1881, Catherine McDougall, a 74-year-old retired dressmaker, lived in the cottage.

== Rear of property ==
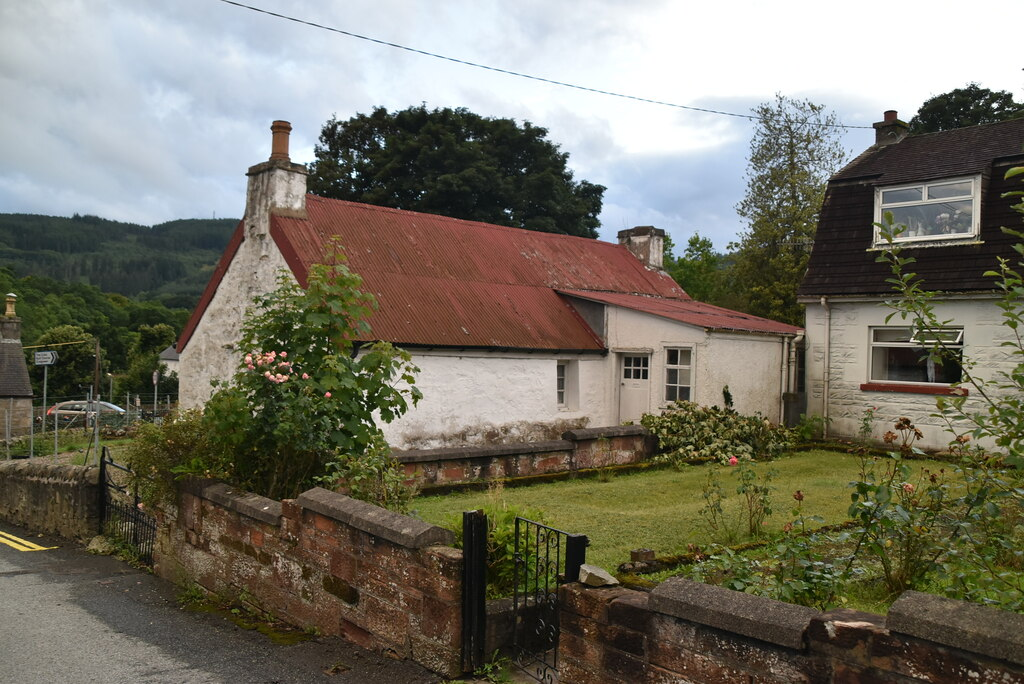
Pictured in 2021

== See also ==
- List of listed buildings in Pitlochry, Perth and Kinross
- List of Historic Environment Scotland properties
