= 51 Atholl Road =

Building in Scotland

- The building in 2008

- Shown in Perth and Kinross 51 Atholl Road (Scotland)
- 56.70241°N 3.7325°W
- Location: 51 Atholl Road, Pitlochry

History
- Built: c. 1895 (131 years ago)

Site notes
- Architect: John Murray Robertson

Listed Building – Category C(S)
- Official name: 51 Atholl Road including ancillary building
- Designated: 9 June 1981
- Reference no.: LB39851

51 Atholl Road stands on Atholl Road, the A924, in the Scottish town of Pitlochry, Perth and Kinross. The structure is a Category C listed building designed by Dundee architect John Murray Robertson.

The town library was housed in the ancillary building until 1981.

== See also ==
- List of listed buildings in Pitlochry, Perth and Kinross
