= Pitlochry War Memorial =

War memorial in Pitlochry, Perth and Kinross, Scotland

- Scotland
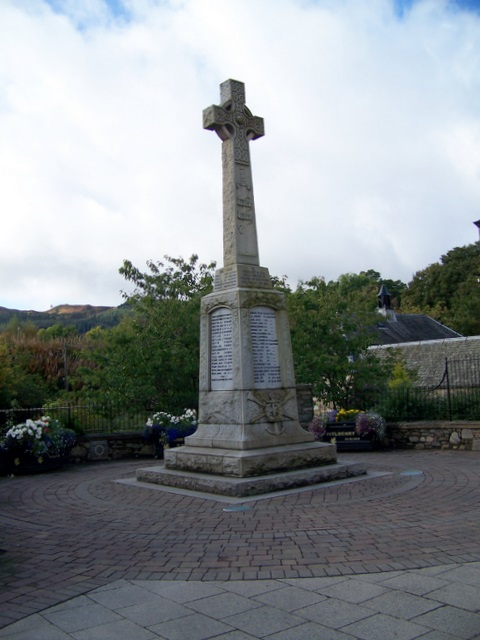
- The memorial in 2009
- For soldiers who died and served in World War I and World War II
- Unveiled: July 23, 1922 (104 years ago)
- Location: 56.70223°N 3.7324°W; Atholl Road, Pitlochry, Perth and Kinross, Scotland
- Commemorated: 82 (81 men, 1 woman (nurse) in World War I; 16 in World War II
- TO THE GLORY OF GOD AND IN MEMORY OF THE MEN OF THIS PARISH WHO FELL IN THE WAR

Unveiled in 1922, the Pitlochry War Memorial is located in the Scottish town of Pitlochry Perth and Kinross. A Category C listed structure, it stands just in front of the town's Memorial Garden (formerly known as the Pitlochry Institute Park). It initially commemorated 81 men and one woman (a nurse) of Moulin parish who died in World War I. The sixteen who died in World War II action were later added.

The site and memorial were gifts of Colonel and Mrs C. A. J. Butter of Cluniemore.

== Memorial Garden ==
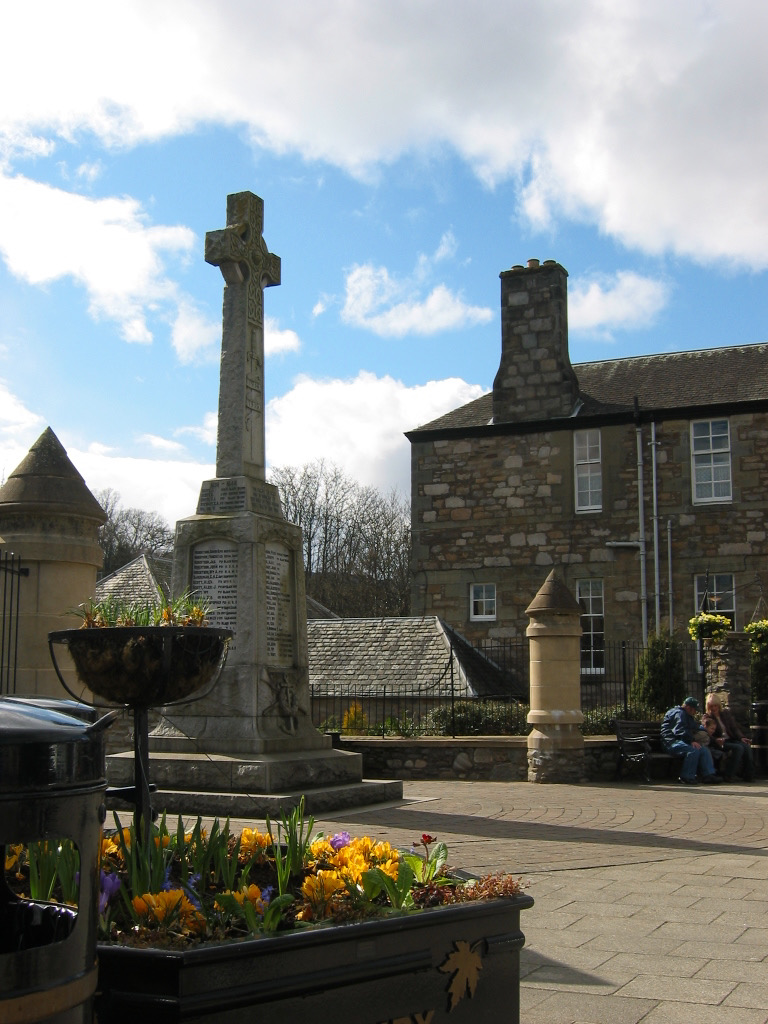
The memorial in front of the Memorial Garden
