= Ben Vrackie =

Mountain in Perth and Kinross, Scotland

Coordinates: 56°44′55″N 3°43′07″W

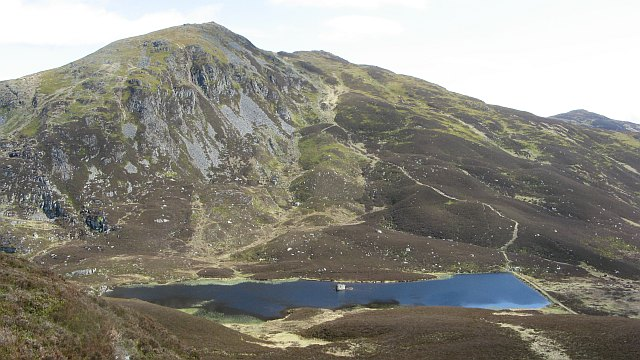
- Ben Vrackie from Càrn nan Gabhar

Highest point
- Elevation: 842 m (2,762 ft)
- Prominence: c. 406 m (1,332 ft)
- Listing: Corbett, Marilyn, HuMP, Simm

Naming
- English translation: Speckled mountain, or Deer-herd mountain
- Language of name: Scottish Gaelic

Geography
- Location: Perthshire, Scotland
- OS grid: NN950632

Geology
- Rock type(s): lime-rich schists, limestone, igneous rocks

Climbing
- Easiest route: Hike

Ben Vrackie (Scottish Gaelic: Beinn a' Bhreacaidh; sometimes anglicised as Ben Y Vrackie) is a mountain in Perthshire, Scotland. It lies north of the town of Pitlochry and reaches 842 metres (2,762 ft) high at its summit.

The summit may be reached by a direct path from Pitlochry or Killiecrankie, and commands views of Pitlochry and the surrounding glens. Loch a' Choire sits under the mountain's south face, and is known as a wild swimming spot.

The area around Ben Vrackie was designated as a Site of Special Scientific Interest in 1955. It is considered important thanks to its varied and well developed range of alpine flora, and for providing habitat to moorland breeding birds as well as larger birds of prey.

== Name ==
The name Ben Vrackie has traditionally been translated from Gaelic as "Speckled Mountain", however more recent investigation has proposed the alternative "Deer-herd Mountain"..

== Ascent ==
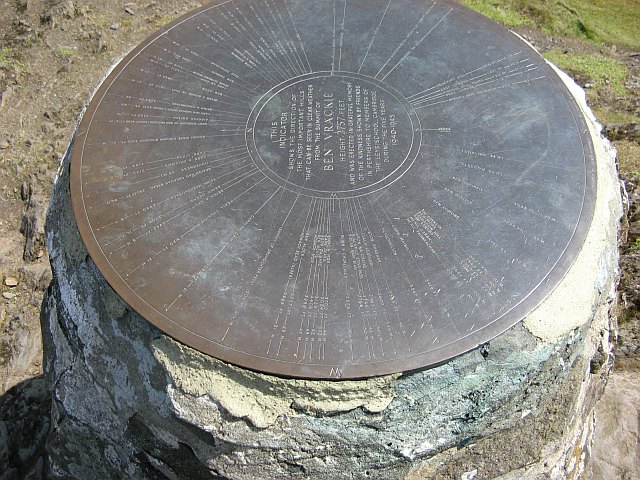
Toposcope at the summit of Ben Vrackie.

Ben Vrackie may be approached along multiple paths. The most common approaches from the south, starting at the village of Moulin, just north of Pitlochry, and has two car parks provided for use by walkers. The route follows the signposted Bealach Walk anticlockwise alongside Moulin burn, before turning right and crossing the dam at Loch a' Choire. An alternative route approaches from Killiecrankie to the west, following the Bealach Walk clockwise, before turning left and following the north shore of the lochan to meet at the same point.

The final climb from here is the steepest part of the ascent. The summit has a trig point and toposcope.
