= Black Castle of Moulin =

Castle in Moulin, Scotland

Coordinates: 56.7100°N 3.7214°W

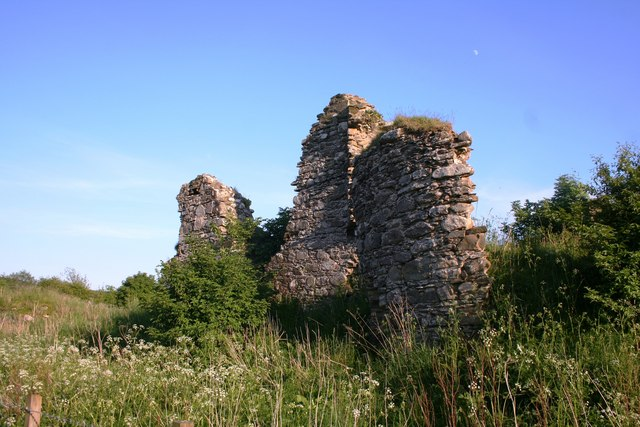
Ruins of Black Castle of Moulin

The Black Castle of Moulin (Scottish Gaelic: Caisteal Dubh Mhaothlinne, also known as An Sean Chaisteal), is a ruined castle located in Moulin near Pitlochry, Scotland. It is a scheduled monument.

The castle was built about 1326 by Sir John Campbell of Lochawe on an island, or crannog, in a loch, now drained. The castle was torched in 1512, due to a fear of plague, and fell into ruins.
