= John Berry (zoologist) =

Scottish zoologist and ecologist

John Berry, CBE DL FRSE (5 August 1907 – 19 February 2002) was a Scottish zoologist and ecologist. He was the first Director of the Nature Conservancy (UK) for Scotland (1949 to 1967). He was the youngest and longest served Fellow of the Royal Society of Edinburgh during the 20th century.

== Life ==
He was born on 5 August 1907, the son of William Berry of Tayfield, an advocate in Edinburgh. His father instilled in him a love of nature conservation and especially bird protection.

His mother died in his early youth and he was largely raised by aunts. He had brittle bones and dyslexia.

John was sent to boarding school, being educated at Eton College in England, and then continuing on to Trinity College, Cambridge before receiving a PhD at St Andrews University. At Cambridge he shared accommodation (and a love of birds) with Peter Scott, later to become one of Britain's most loved ornithologists. During this time Berry was nicknamed ’’’Gooseberry’’’, due to his love and knowledge of geese. In 1936 he married fellow ornithologist, Bride Fremantle.

Upon graduation, Berry first found employment at University College, Dundee, researching the biology of fish, then moved to the University of Southampton. Here he came to the attention of Prof D’Arcy Thompson and was persuaded to study for a Doctorate at the University of St Andrews.

In 1936, aged 29 he was elected a Fellow of the Royal Society of Edinburgh, the youngest Fellow of the 20th century. Having 66 years service in the Society he was also the oldest Fellow and the longest served.

In the 1930s he was involved in counter-intelligence work in Germany and Hungary. During the Second World War he was the official Press Censor for Scotland (1940–44).

During this same period he was commissioned by the Scottish Hydro-Electricity Board to design the Pitlochry fish ladder to allow migrating salmon to circumnavigate the large dam built there. This included viewing galleries for the public as it was realised this strange feature had strong value as a visitor attraction.

In October 1948 he represented the UK at the conference establishing the International Union for Conservation of Nature at Fontainbleau in France. Berry was established as Head of Nature Conservation in Scotland immediately thereafter, prior to the legal implementation of the National Parks and Access to the Countryside Act the next year.

In 1951 he declared Beinn Eighe the first Scottish National Nature Reserve. He went on to designate Tentsmuir Forest, Morton Lochs, Loch Leven and the Cairngorms. He also brought about the acquisition of Rùm and St Kilda.

In 1969 he was elected Deputy Lieutenant of Fife.

In 1970 the University of Dundee awarded him an Honorary Doctor of Letters (LLD) and in 1991 the University of St Andrews awarded him an Honorary Doctor of Science.

Berry died on 19 February 2002 aged 94. His archives, including papers relating to his work on North of Scotland Hydro-Electric Board projects and their environmental impact and several files relating to his work on wildfowl, are held by Archive Services at the University of Dundee.

== Publications ==
- ’’Wild Geese and Wild Duck of Scotland’’ (1939) with the aid of data from his childhood friends, Mss Baxter and Rintoul
