= Port na Craig =

Coordinates: 56.6971°N 3.7341°W

Port na Craig (also spelt Port-na-Craig or Port-na-craig) is a historic village in Perth and Kinross, Scotland, located directly across the River Tummel from Pitlochry.

A ferry connected Port na Craig and Pitlochry from the 12th century until 1913, when a pedestrian bridge was built between the two.

Port na Craig is the location of the Pitlochry Festival Theatre, opened in 1981.
