= Pitlochry Town Hall =

Municipal building in Pitlochry, Scotland

- The building in 2020, looking south

- Shown in Perth and Kinross Pitlochry Town Hall (Scotland)
- 56.704755°N 3.733665°W
- Location: West Moulin Road, Pitlochry

History
- Built: 1900 (126 years ago)

Site notes
- Architect: Alexander Ness
- Architectural style: Scottish Renaissance style

Listed Building – Category B
- Official name: West Moulin Road, Town Hall, Including Boundary Walls
- Designated: 20 December 2000
- Reference no.: LB47549

Pitlochry Town Hall is a municipal structure in West Moulin Road, Pitlochry, Scotland. The structure, which is used as an events venue, is a Category B listed building.

== History ==
Following a visit by Queen Victoria and Prince Albert in 1842 and significant subsequent population growth throughout the second half of the 19th century, local leaders decided to raise money by public subscription for the construction of a public hall. The site they chose was donated by the explorer of East Africa and dog breeder, Captain Archibald Edward Butter of the Faskally Estate. A significant donation was received from Lieutenant Colonel George Glas Sandeman, owner of a large wine importing business, based at Fonab Castle. The design competition was adjudicated by Charles Gourlay of Glasgow Technical College and won by Alexander Ness of Dundee, whose design was judged better than that of the local architects, John Menzies and John Leonard.

The foundation stone for the new building was laid by Sir Alexander Muir Mackenzie, 3rd Baronet, with full masonic honours on 18 May 1899. It was designed in the Scottish Renaissance style, built in rubble masonry with sandstone ashlar dressings at a cost of £2,366 and was officially opened in 1900. The design involved a symmetrical main frontage with three bays facing onto West Moulin Road; the central bay featured a doorway with a three-part fanlight flanked by brackets supporting a stone balcony with a balustrade. On the first floor, there was a four-light mullioned and transomed window with a gable containing a cartouche above. The outer bays were fenestrated with sash windows and surmounted, on the first floor, by small segmental pediments. There was also a polygonal tower with an ogee-shaped roof at the northwest corner of the building. Internally, the principal room was the main assembly hall.

The building, which was initially known as Pitlochry Public Hall, was primarily used as an events venue and started showing silent films in 1919. It became the meeting place of the local burgh council, after it was formed in 1947, but ceased to be the local seat of government when the enlarged Perth and Kinross District Council was formed in 1975. The building was transferred to the management of Atholl Leisure Centre in 1991.

== See also ==
- List of listed buildings in Pitlochry, Perth and Kinross
