= Glen D. Palmer Dam =

Dam in Yorkville, Illinois

Coordinates: 41.64313°N 88.44305°W

- Interactive map of Glen D. Palmer Dam
- Country: United States
- Location: Yorkville, Illinois
- Status: Operational
- Opening date: 1952

Power Station

The Glen D. Palmer Dam is a 6-foot-high (1.8 m) dam across the Fox River in Yorkville, Illinois, about 35.9 miles (58.2 km) upstream from the confluence with the Illinois River, and 940 feet (366 m) upstream from the Route-47 bridge. The dam is named after the original manager of the State Game Farm, formerly located in Yorkville.

There has been a dam at this site since the early 19th century. Kendall County was established on February 19, 1841 and the government township (37 North, Range, 7 East) plat was signed on August 25, 1842. Labeled on this plat are: "Howe's Mill Dam" and a sawmill on the south side of the river. Surveys taken in 1837 and 1838, show there was a dam across the Fox River at Yorkville as part of a mill, near the present dam location. Records indicate that the Yorkville mill buildings were destroyed by fire. In 1915 an old "wood crib" dam existed across the Fox River, with a head-race on the south side of the river. It collapsed subsequent to a Spring flood. Its ruins remained submerged and decomposing, until such time as the current dam was built in 1962, as a part of the Stratton project dam system which was designed to keep the river navigable from the Wisconsin border to the confluence with the Illinois River. The original dam had a modified ogee crest and a spillway length of 530 ft (160 m), which created turbulence at the base of the dam. As a result, there were a number of fatal accidents caused when kayakers or canoers sailed over the dam, and at least 26 people have drowned at the dam.

In 2006, the Illinois Department of Natural Resources started to renovate the dam changing the shape of the spillway and adding a fish ladder and an 1,100-foot-long (340 m) fish/ canoe bypass channel. The project was completed in 2010. This project was the first Denil style ladder in the State of Illinois.
