= Pitlochry fish ladder =

Structure in Perth and Kinross, Scotland

Coordinates: 56.69883°N 3.73943°W

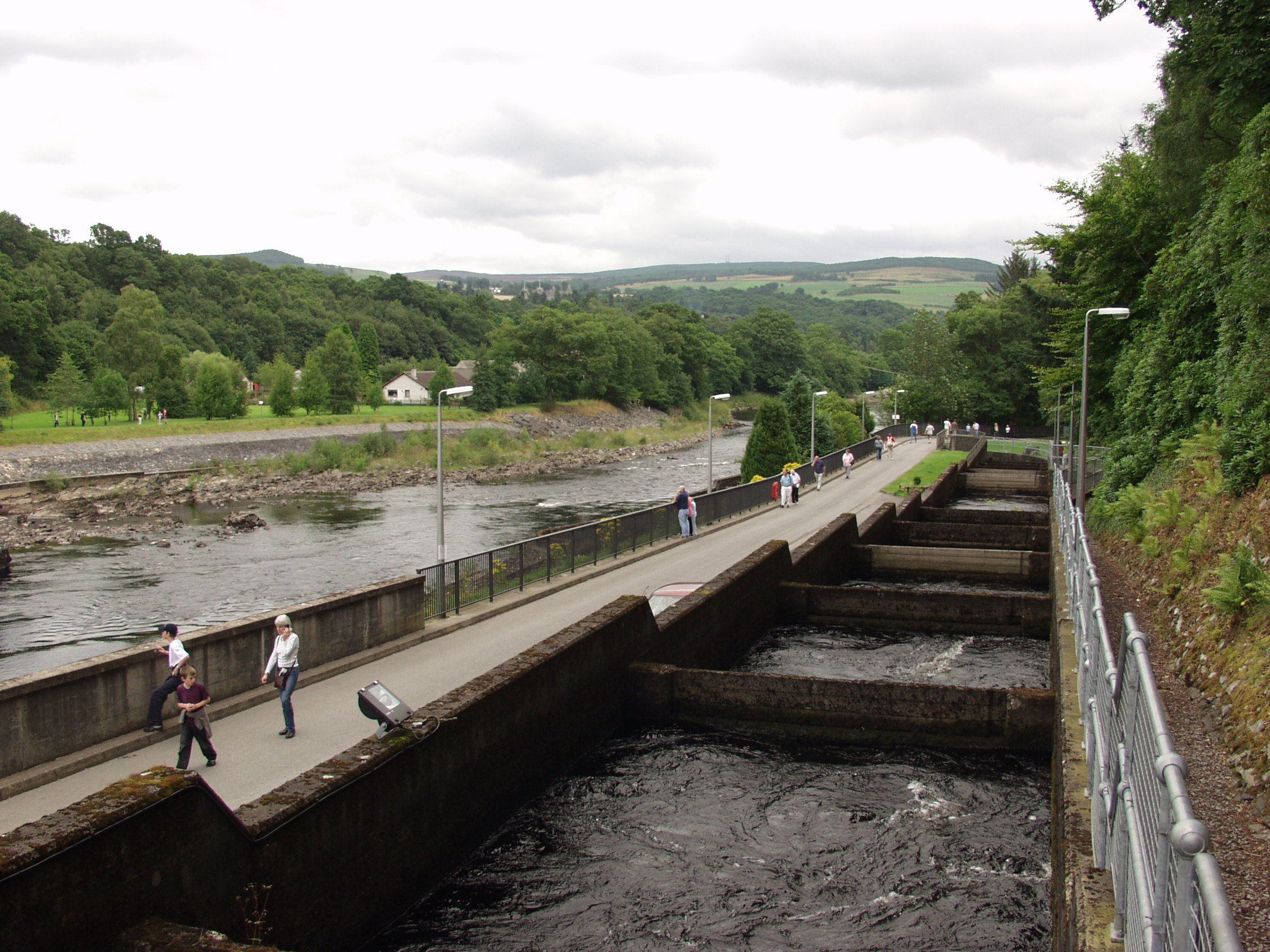
The fish ladder in Pitlochry, showing several of the intermediate pools which the salmon use for travelling upstream. The River Tummel can be seen flowing next to it.

The Pitlochry fish ladder is a fish ladder next to the Pitlochry Power Station, near Pitlochry, Perth and Kinross, Scotland, which allows salmon to travel upstream during the breeding season.

Although viewing the ladder is still allowed, the observation tank as of July 2019 has been closed due to "access and safety concerns". Live web feeds are still available via the visitor's centre.

== Construction details ==
The ladder was constructed as a result of a 1943 Act of Parliament which laid a duty of care on the North of Scotland Hydro-Electric Board to preserve fish stocks in the waterways encompassing its power schemes. The form and design were created by the fish biologist John Berry.

It was completed in 1951 alongside the dam for the hydro-electric power station as part of the Tummel hydro-electric power scheme and was installed in 1952. It was the first of its type in Scotland.

The fish ladder consists of 34 separate pools, each 50 centimetres (1.6 ft) higher than the last and covering a distance of 310 metres (340 yd). Each pool has a 1-metre (3 ft 3 in) opening below the water level to allow the fish to pass to the next pool; a continuous flow of water maintains the water level in the pools. There are three larger pools which allow the fish to rest during their ascent, and one of these has an underwater viewing area with a glass wall and CCTV cameras to allow the public to observe the fish making their climb during the breeding season. The ladder is equipped with a fish counter which allows the number of fish making the journey each year to be recorded. In 2006, 7,238 fish were recorded travelling up the ladder.

The 2016 total, as of 13 September, was 6,098 fish. The 2006 and 2016 figures were relatively high when taken in context with the counts since 1980. An average figure has been nearer to 4,000 fish, looking at the Tay District Salmon Fisheries Board report of 2015.

The dam across the River Tummel at Pitlochry (that led to the formation of Loch Faskally) was constructed between 1947 and 1950 as part of the Board's Tummel Hydro-Electric Power Scheme. Without the fish ladder, it would have been an impassable obstacle for the migrating salmon.
