= Adam Fergusson (minister) =

Church of Scotland minister

The Rev. Adam Fergusson (1706–1785) was a Church of Scotland minister who served as Moderator of the General Assembly in 1772.

== Life ==
He was born in 1706 the son Alexander Fergusson of Ballichandy and his wife, Magdalen Ogilvy. He had no known university education but was licensed to preach by the Presbytery of Dunkeld in December 1726.

In September 1728 he was ordained as assistant minister at Killin Parish Church. In October 1735 he was presented to the congregation of Moulin by James the Duke of Atholl as patron. He translated to that parish in February 1736 and served as minister there for almost 50 years.

In 1758 he succeeded Rev Robert Walker as Moderator of the General Assembly of the Church of Scotland the highest position in the Scottish church.

He died in the manse at Moulin on 12 December 1785. His position in Moulin was filled by Rev. Alexander Stewart.

== Family ==
In October 1735 he married Amelia Menzies (d. 1758) daughter of Captain James Menzies of Comrie. Their children included:

- Captain John Fergusson HEICS (1743-1773) assassinated at Cape of Good Hope on 4 September 1773 by Captain David Roche
- James Fergusson (b. 1745) died at Bath
- Neil Fergusson of Woodhill (1748-1803) advocate and later Sheriff of Fife buried in Greyfriars Kirkyard
- Adam Fergusson (1750-1774) died in India
- Ann married Thomas Bisset of Logierait
- Vere Fergusson (d. 1818) buried in Greyfriars Kirkyard

== Publications ==
- 1750: The leading characters of the Church of Rome: a sermon upon reformation and revolution principles. Preached before the Synod of Perth and Stirling, April 11. 1750. Edinburgh: Printed by Hamilton, Balfour, and Neill
