= Loch Faskally =

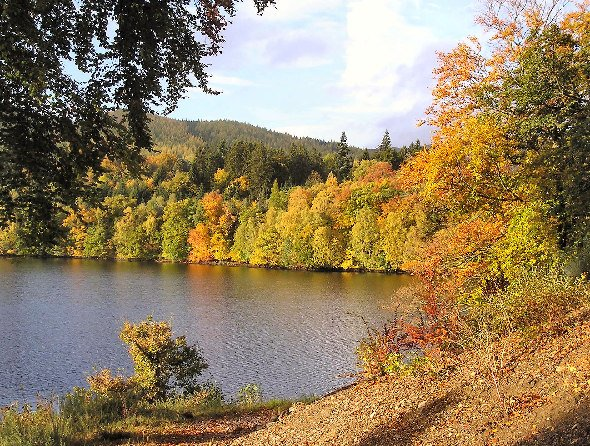

- Location within Perth and Kinross
- Location: Perth and Kinross, Scotland
- Coordinates: 56°42′25″N 3°45′35″W
- Type: reservoir
- Basin countries: United Kingdom
- Max. length: 3.2 km (2.0 mi)

Loch Faskally (Scottish Gaelic: Loch Fascallaidh) is a man-made reservoir in Perth and Kinross, Scotland, 2.5 kilometres (1.6 mi) northwest of Pitlochry.

== Geography ==
The loch lies between steeply wooded hills and is approximately 3.2 kilometres (2.0 mi) in length, narrowing to around 700 metres (770 yd) wide. The loch is retained by the Pitlochry Dam which was built by Wimpey Construction between 1947 and 1950 as part of the North of Scotland Hydro-Electric Board's Tummel Hydro-Electric Power Scheme. The dam incorporates a salmon fish ladder, allowing around 5,400 salmon to ascend annually, and is a popular visitor attraction.

The loch is popular with anglers. The water holds a good head of brown trout and the native fish are augmented by a stocking in the 1-5lb range. A 7-pounder was recorded in 2001. Salmon and a few sea trout pass through as they head up the Tummel and Garry systems. 54 salmon were caught in 2001 the best being a fish of 14 ½ lbs, however fish to 28lbs have also been caught. June also sees the arrival of the summer grilse.

There are also good numbers of small pike with a few larger specimens mixed in. The best recorded pike have been over 30lb.
