= Fish ladder =

Structure to allow fish to migrate upriver around barriers

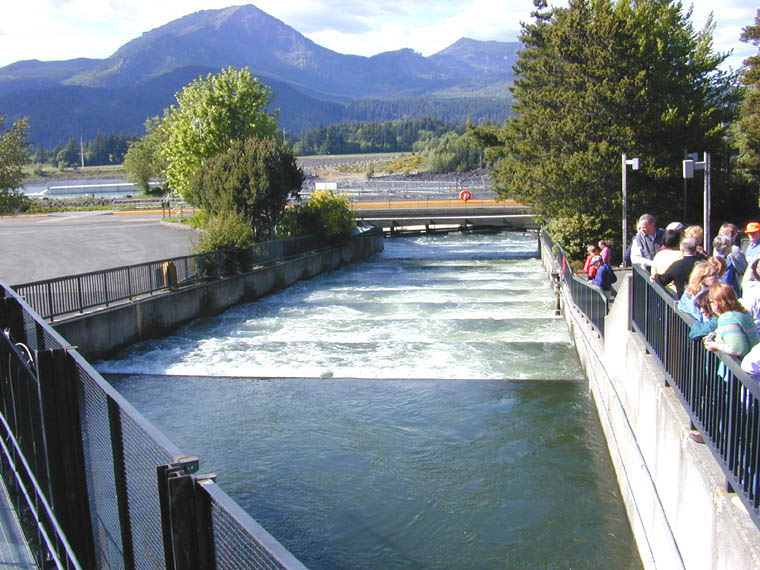
Pool-and-weir fish ladder at Bonneville Dam on the Columbia River

A fish ladder, also known as a pescalator, fishway, fish pass, fish steps or fish cannon, is a waterway structure on or around artificial and natural barriers (such as dams, locks and waterfalls) that provides aquatic animals (particularly fish) a "detour" to facilitate natural movements and migrations of diadromous and potamodromous species.

Fishways enable fish to pass around the water level difference around barriers by swimming and/or leaping up a series of relatively low stepped spillway (hence the term ladder), which is built in the form of a small, serpentine, low-discharge canal to the side of the barrier. Each "step" is created by a low weir and each section between the steps functions as a stream pool, allowing fish to rest temporarily and make graduated ascent/descent until they finally reach the main body of water on the other side of the barrier. The velocity of water falling over the step has to be great enough to attract the fish to the ladder, but it cannot be so great that it washes fish back downstream or exhausts them to the point of inability to continue their journey upriver.

== History ==
Written reports of rough fishways date to 17th-century France, where bundles of branches were used to make steps in steep channels to bypass obstructions.

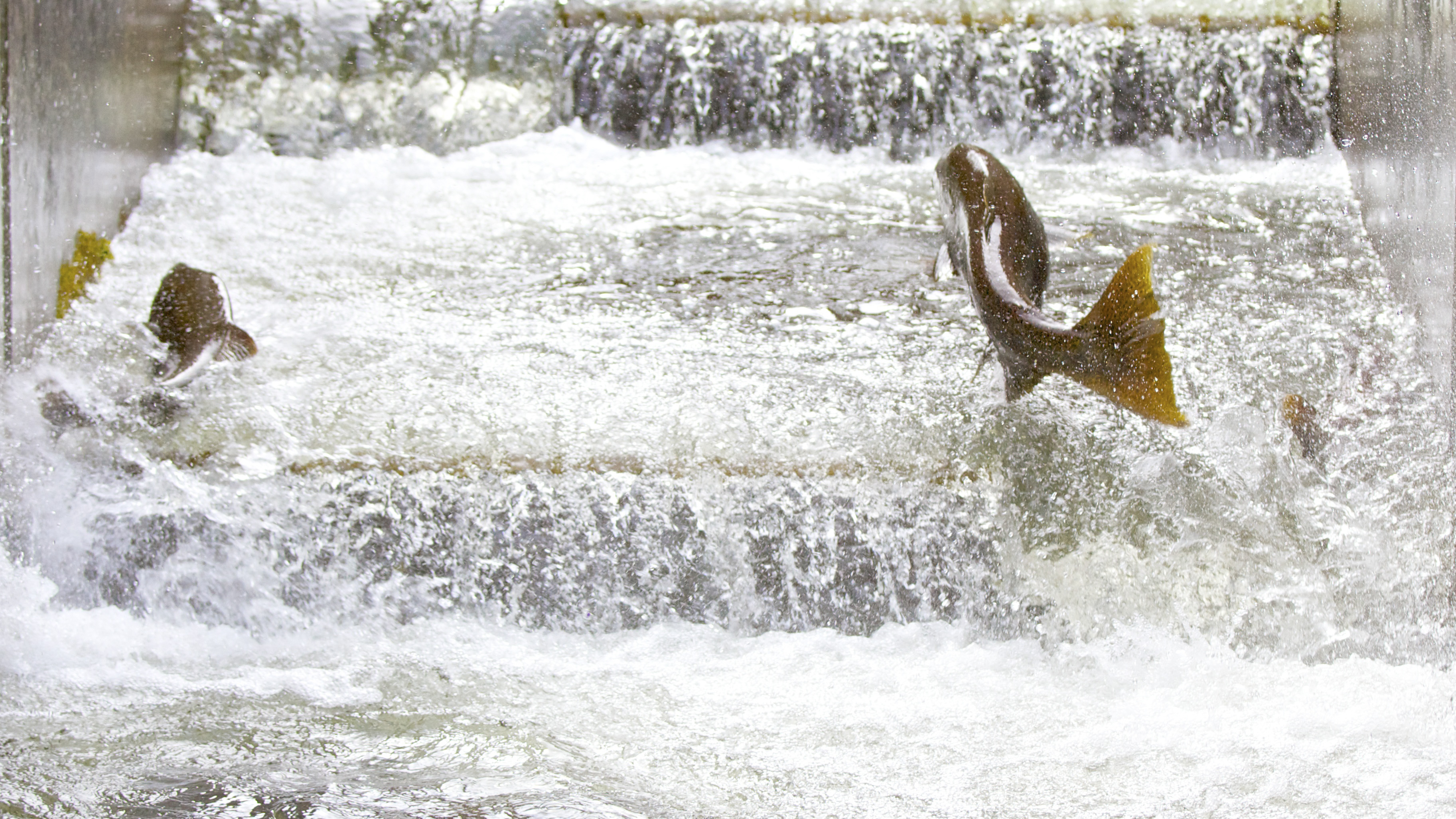
Salmon climbing a ladder on Issaquah Creek, Washington

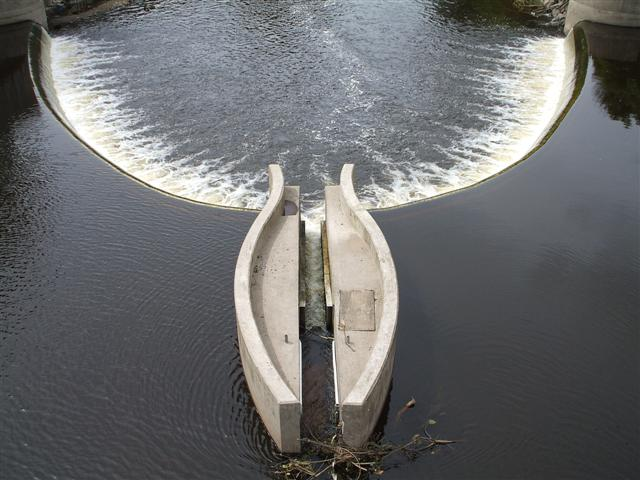
Cameras or other types of devices can be used to count fish as they pass through the ladder.

A 1714 construction of an old channel bypassing a dam, "originally cut for the passage of fish up and down the river", is mentioned in the 1823 U.S. First Circuit Court case Tyler v. Wilkinson. This example predates the 1880 fish ladder at Pawtuxet Falls. The 1714 channel "wholly failed for this purpose" and, in 1730, a mill was built in its place. The channel and its mill usage became an important legal case in U.S. water law.

A pool and weir salmon ladder was built around 1830 by James Smith, a Scottish engineer on the River Teith, near Deanston, Perthshire in Scotland. Both the weir and salmon ladder are there today and many subsequent salmon ladders built in Scotland were inspired by it.

A version was patented in 1837 by Richard McFarlan of Bathurst, New Brunswick, Canada, who designed a fishway to bypass a dam at his water-powered lumber mill. In 1852–1854, the Ballisodare Fish Pass was built in County Sligo in Ireland to draw salmon into a river that had not supported a fishery. In 1880, the first fish ladder was built in Rhode Island, United States, on the Pawtuxet Falls Dam. The ladder was removed in 1924, when the City of Providence replaced the wood dam with a concrete one. USA legislated fishways in 1888.

As the Industrial Age advanced, dams and other river obstructions became larger and more common, leading to the need for effective fish by-passes.

== Types ==
Pool and weir
One of the oldest styles of fish ladders. It uses a series of small dams and pools of regular length to make a long, sloping channel for fish to travel around the obstruction. The channel acts as a fixed lock to gradually step down the water level; to head upstream, fish must jump over from box to box in the ladder.
Baffle fishway
Uses a series of symmetrical close-spaced baffles in a channel to redirect the flow of water, allowing fish to swim around the barrier.

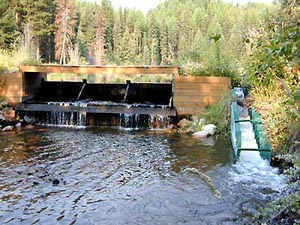
Denil Fishway on Salmon Creek, Montana

Baffle fishways need not have resting areas, although pools can be included to provide a resting area or to reduce the velocity of the flow. Such fishways can be built with switchbacks to minimize the space needed for their construction. Baffles come in variety of designs. The most common design is the Larinier pass, named after the French engineer who designed them. They are suitable for coarse fish as well as salmonids, and can be built large enough to be used by canoes. The original design for a Denil fishway was developed in 1909 by a Belgian scientist, G. Denil; it has since been adjusted and adapted in many ways. The Alaskan Steeppass, for example, is a modular prefabricated Denil-fishway variant originally designed for remote areas of Alaska. Baffles have been installed by Project Maitai in several waterways in Nelson, New Zealand, to improve fish passage as part of general environmental restoration.
Fish elevator (or fish lift)
Breaks with the ladder design by providing a sort of elevator to carry fish over a barrier.

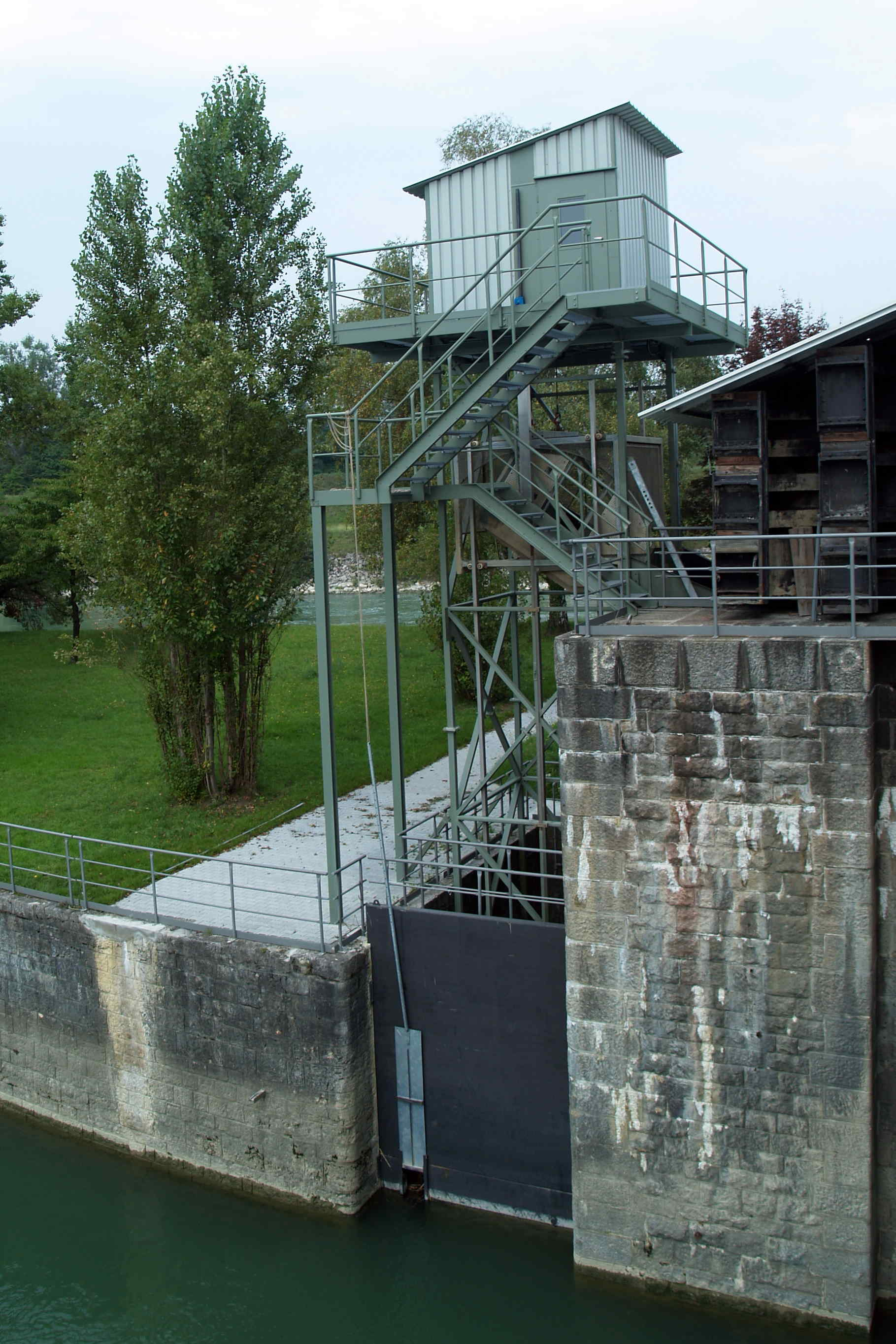
Fish elevator

It is well suited to tall barriers. With a fish elevator, fish swim into a collection area at the base of the obstruction. When enough fish accumulate in the collection area, they are nudged into a hopper that carries them into a flume that empties into the river above the barrier. On the Connecticut River, for example, two fish elevators lift up to 500 fish at a time, 52 feet (15.85 m), to clear the Holyoke Dam. In 2013, the elevator carried over 400,000 fish.
Rock-ramp fishway
Uses large rocks and timbers to make pools and small falls that mimic natural structures. Because of the length of the channel needed for the ladder, such structures are most appropriate for relatively short barriers. They have a significant advantage in that they can provide fish spawning habitat.
Vertical-slot fish passage
Similar to a pool-and-weir system, except that each "dam" has a narrow slot in it near the channel wall. This allows fish to swim upstream without leaping over an obstacle. Vertical-slot fish passages also tend to handle reasonably well the seasonal fluctuation in water levels on each side of the barrier. Recent studies suggest that navigation locks have a potential to be operated as vertical slot fishways to provide increased access for a range of biota, including poor swimmers.
Fish siphon
Allows the pass to be installed parallel to a water course and can be used to link two watercourses. The pass utilises a syphon effect to regulate its flow. This style is particularly favoured to aid flood defence.
Fish cannon
A wet, flexible pneumatic tube uses air pressure to suck in salmon one at a time and gently shoot them out into the destination water. The system was originally designed by Bellevue, Washington company Whooshh to safely move apples.
Fish lock
A fish lock is a structure designed to facilitate the passage of fish over barriers such as dams or weirs, enabling them to access upstream habitats essential for spawning and growth. It operates similarly to a navigation lock, using a chamber that fills and empties to move fish across the barrier by adjusting water levels to match the upstream and downstream sections. There are several types of fish locks, such as the Borland fish lock, Deelder lock, Pavlov lock, and most recently, the Fishcon lock.
Fishcon lock
The Fishcon lock enables both upstream and downstream fish migration in a compact space and was developed by the company Fishcon.

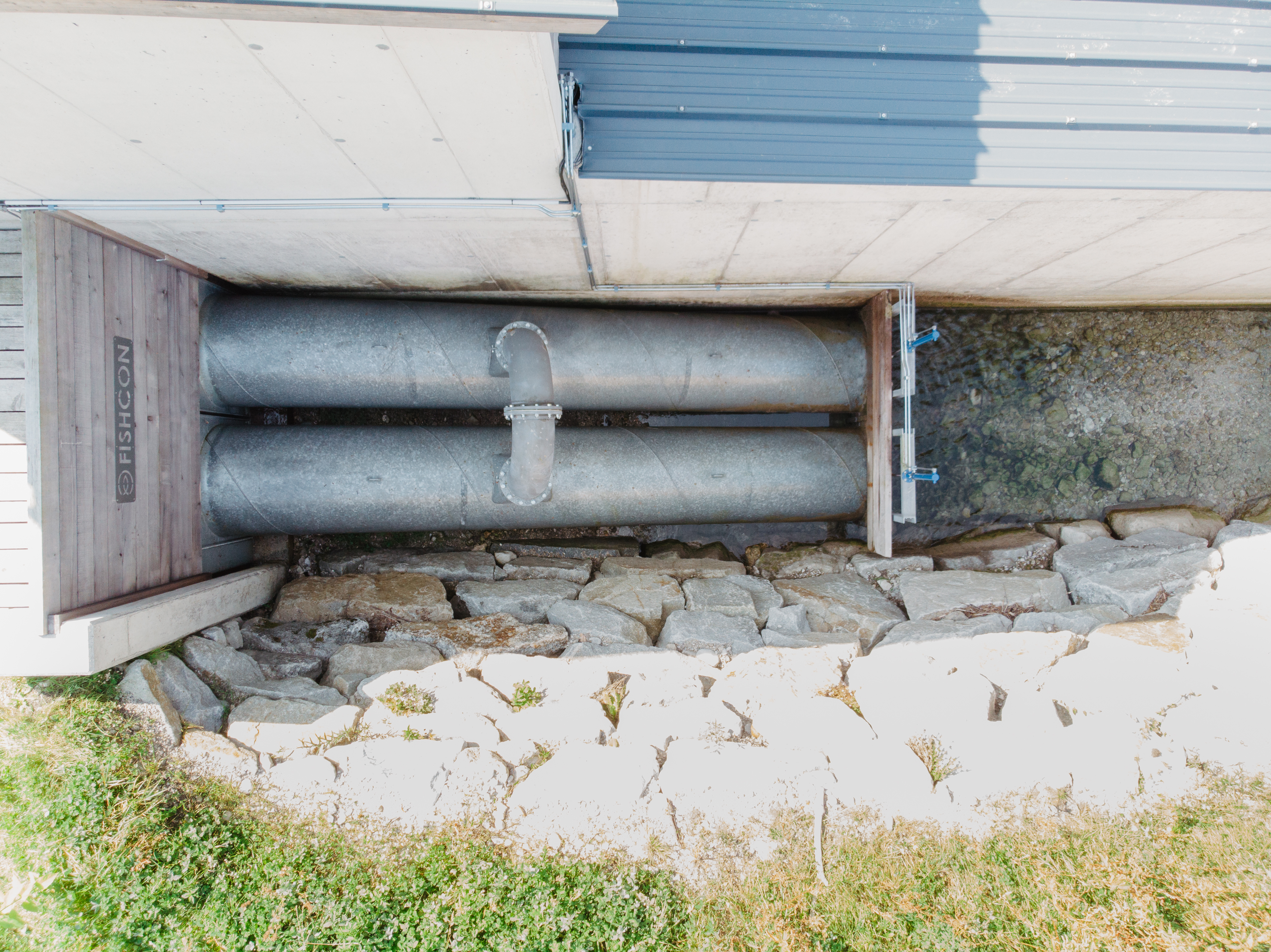
Fishcon lock on the river Alm in Austria

Between 2019 and mid-2024, seven Fishcon locks were installed in Austria, Germany and Switzerland. Five of these installations have been already independently evaluated with great results and deemed functional according to Austrian and German standards.
Borland fish lock
This is similar to a canal lock. At the downstream end of the obstruction, fish are attracted to a collecting pool by an outflow of water through a sluice gate. At fixed intervals, the gate is closed, and water from the upper level fills the collecting pool and an inclined shaft, lifting the fish up to the upstream level. Once the shaft is full, a sluice at the top level opens, to allow fish to continue their journey upstream. The top sluice then closes, and the shaft empties for the process to begin again. A number of Borland fish locks have been built in Scotland, associated with hydro-electric dams, including one at Aigas Dam on the River Beauly.
Deelder lock
Developed by Dutch engineer Klaas Deelder, this design features two chambers separated by an internal weir. Fish enter the lower chamber, which then fills with water, allowing them to swim over the weir into the upper chamber and continue upstream. This method has been effective in passing a wide range of fish species and sizes.
Pavlov lock
This design, attributed to Russian engineer Dmitry Sergeyevich Pavlov, incorporates features to guide fish into the lock chamber, such as attraction flows and holding pools. The lock operates cyclically, filling and emptying to move fish upstream, and has been implemented in various regions to assist fish migration.

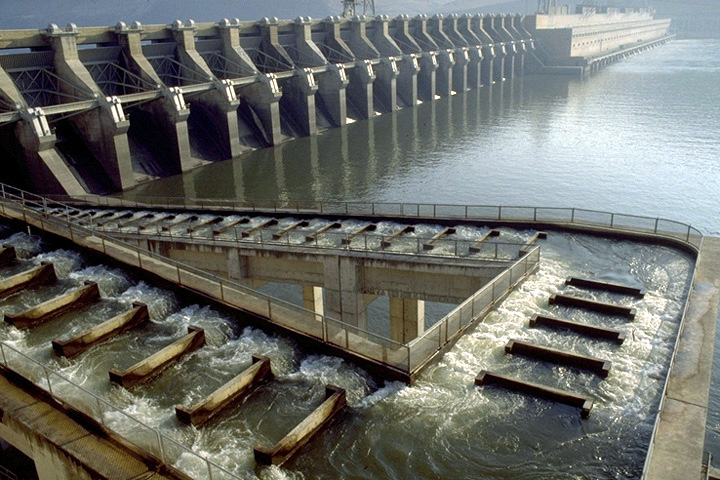
John Day Dam fish ladder on the Columbia River, United States

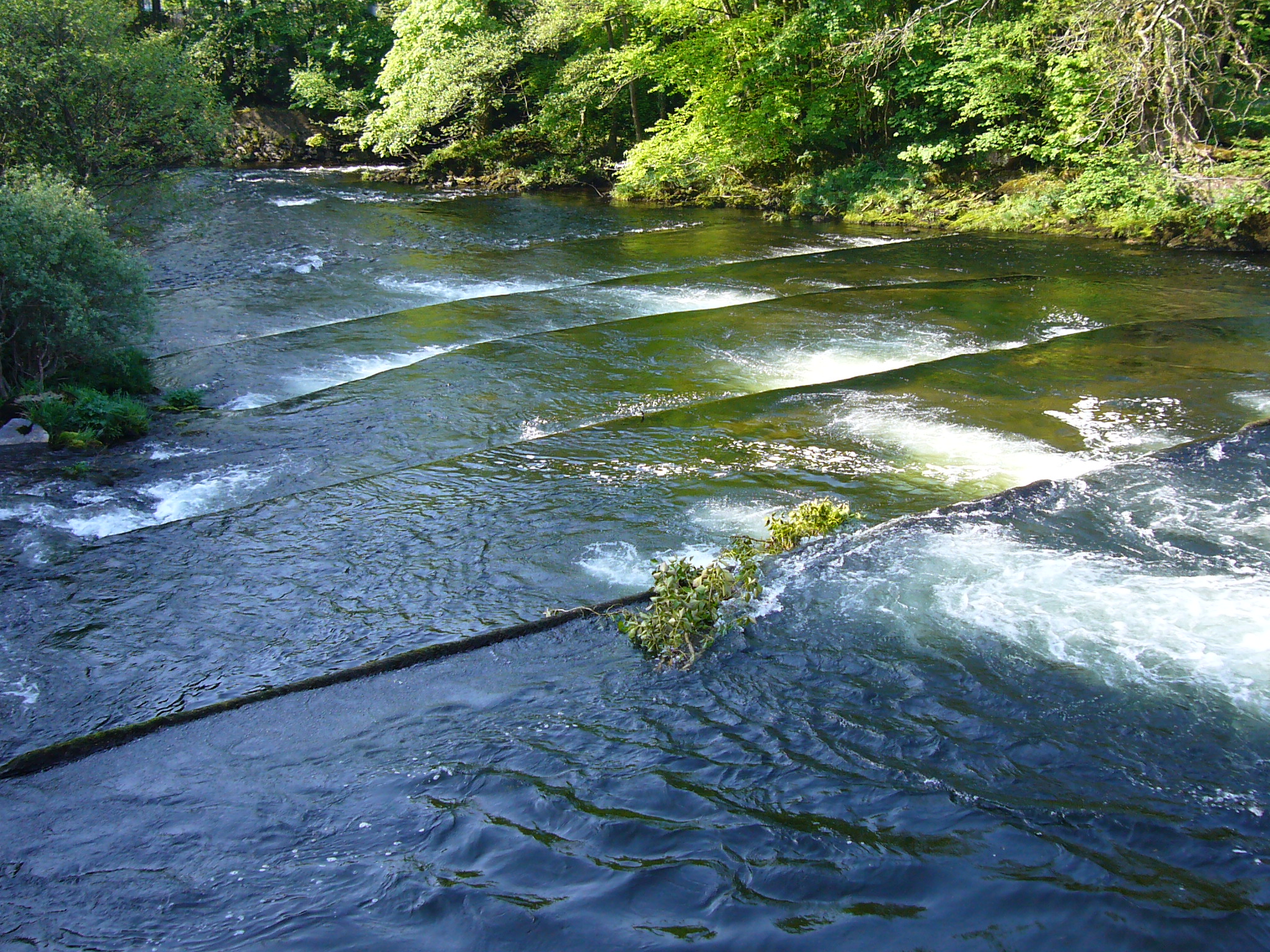
Detail of fish ladder on the River Dart in England

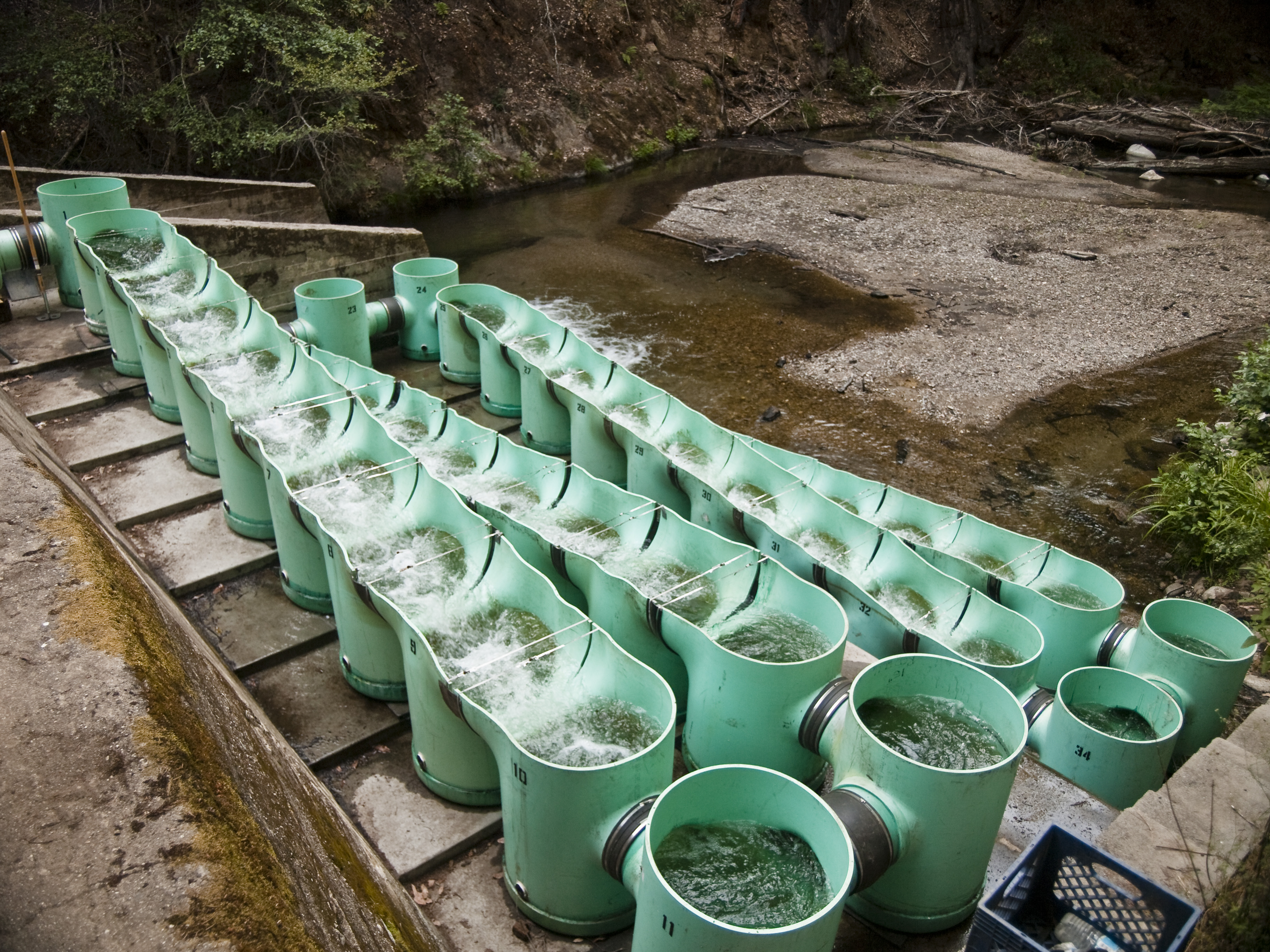
Bi-directional, seasonal ladder at Camp Pico Blanco on the Little Sur River in Big Sur, California, United States

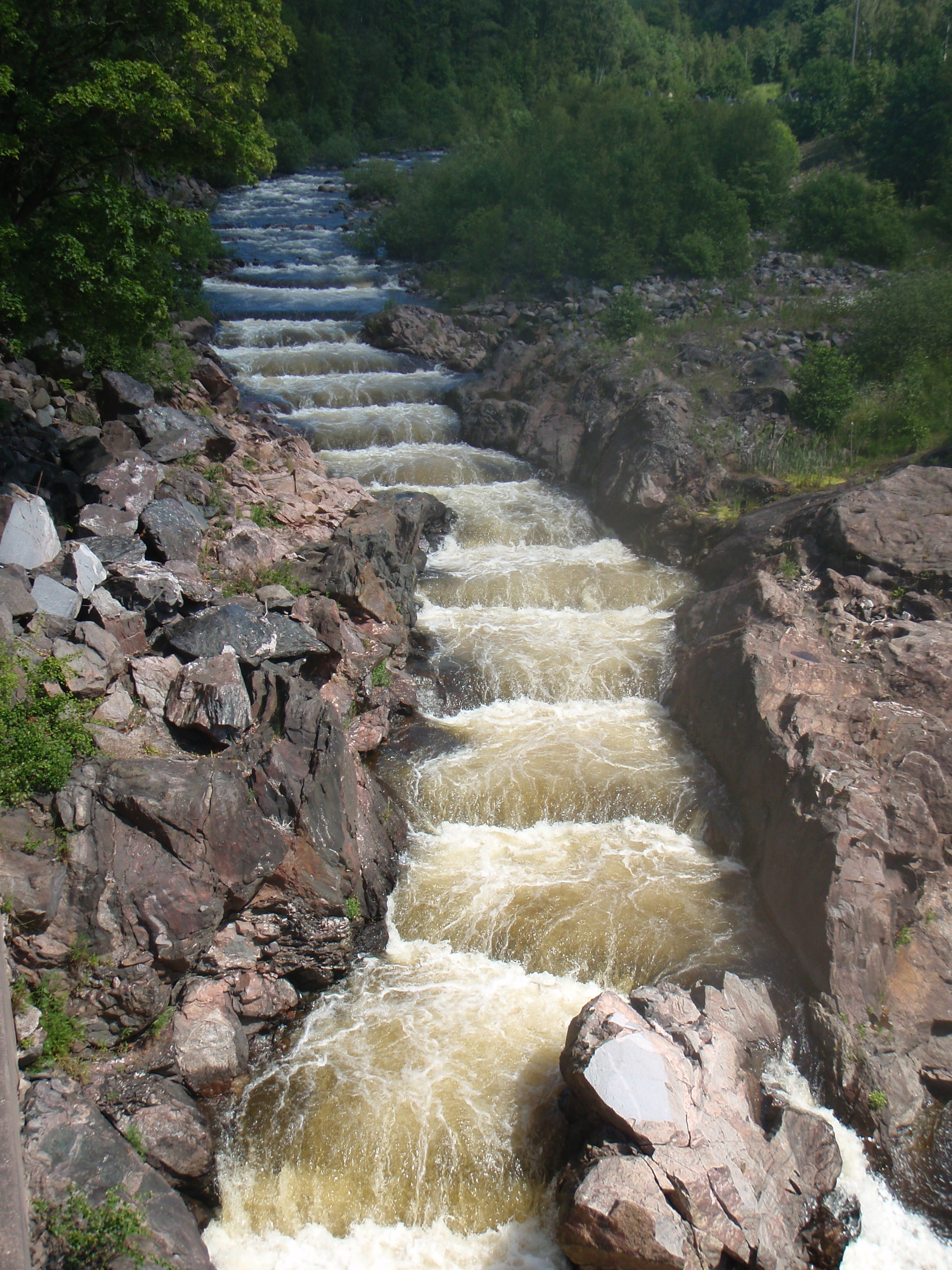
Fish ladder for salmon near the power station in Gullspång, Sweden

Video example of a meander fish pass

== Effectiveness ==
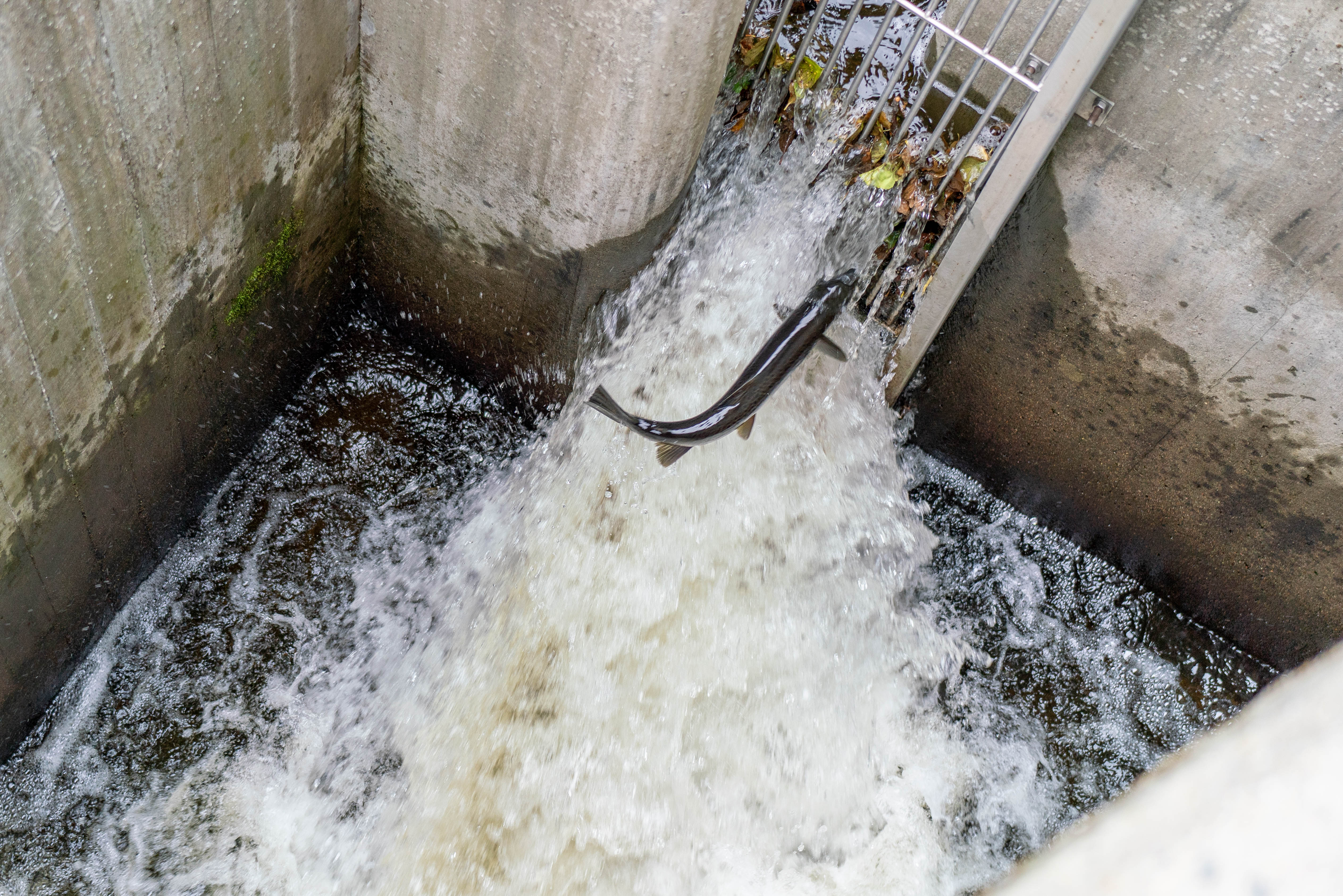
This fish failed to enter the narrow opening in the fish ladder in Akerselva, Norway. The very narrow slots and the accumulated debris is likely hindering the effectiveness of this particular passageway.

Fish ladders have a mixed record of effectiveness. This varies for different types of species, with one study showing that only three percent of American Shad make it through all the fish ladders on the way to their spawning ground. Effectiveness depends on the fish species' swimming ability, and how the fish moves up and downstream. A fish passage that is designed to allow fish to pass upstream may not allow passage downstream, for instance.

Fish passages do not always work. In practice a challenge is matching swimming performance data to hydrodynamic measurements. Swim tests rarely use the same protocol and the output is either a single-point measurement or a bulk velocity. In contrast, physical and numerical modelling of fluid flow (i.e. hydrodynamics) deliver a detailed flow map, with a fine spatial and temporal resolution. Regulatory agencies face a difficult task to match hydrodynamic measurements and swimming performance data.

In North Carolina, the Cape Fear River watershed, effectiveness of the fish passageway improves habitual conditions for cleaner water and increase fish population. Cape Fear River uses "lock and dam" structures that prevent fishes from migrating upstream. In 2012, at Lock and Dam No.1, the watershed allows the fish to migrate upstream using a fish passage structure that resembles stream rapids. The Cape Fear River Partnership by NOAA's Office of Habitat Conservation, are using the fish passageways to restore fish back into the water shed to improve the habitat with cleaner water and benefiting local communities.

== Culverts ==
The ecological impact of culverts on natural streams and rivers has been recognised. While the culvert discharge capacity derives from hydrological and hydraulic engineering considerations, this results often in large velocities in the barrel, which may prevent fish from passing through.

Baffles may be installed along the barrel invert to provide some fish-friendly alternative. For low discharges, the baffles decrease the flow velocity and increase the water depth to facilitate fish passage. At larger discharges, baffles induce lower local velocities and generate recirculation regions. It may be possible to accommodate fish passage by alternating baffle slots thereby mimicking natural sinuosity of stream flow. However, baffles can reduce drastically the culvert discharge capacity for a given afflux, thus increasing substantially the total cost of the culvert structure to achieve the same design discharge and afflux. It is believed that fish-turbulence interplay may facilitate upstream migration, albeit an optimum design must be based upon a careful characterization of both hydrodynamics and fish kinematics. Finally the practical engineering design implications cannot be ignored, while a solid understanding of turbulence typology is a basic requirement to any successful boundary treatment conducive of upstream fish passage.

== Hydropower ==
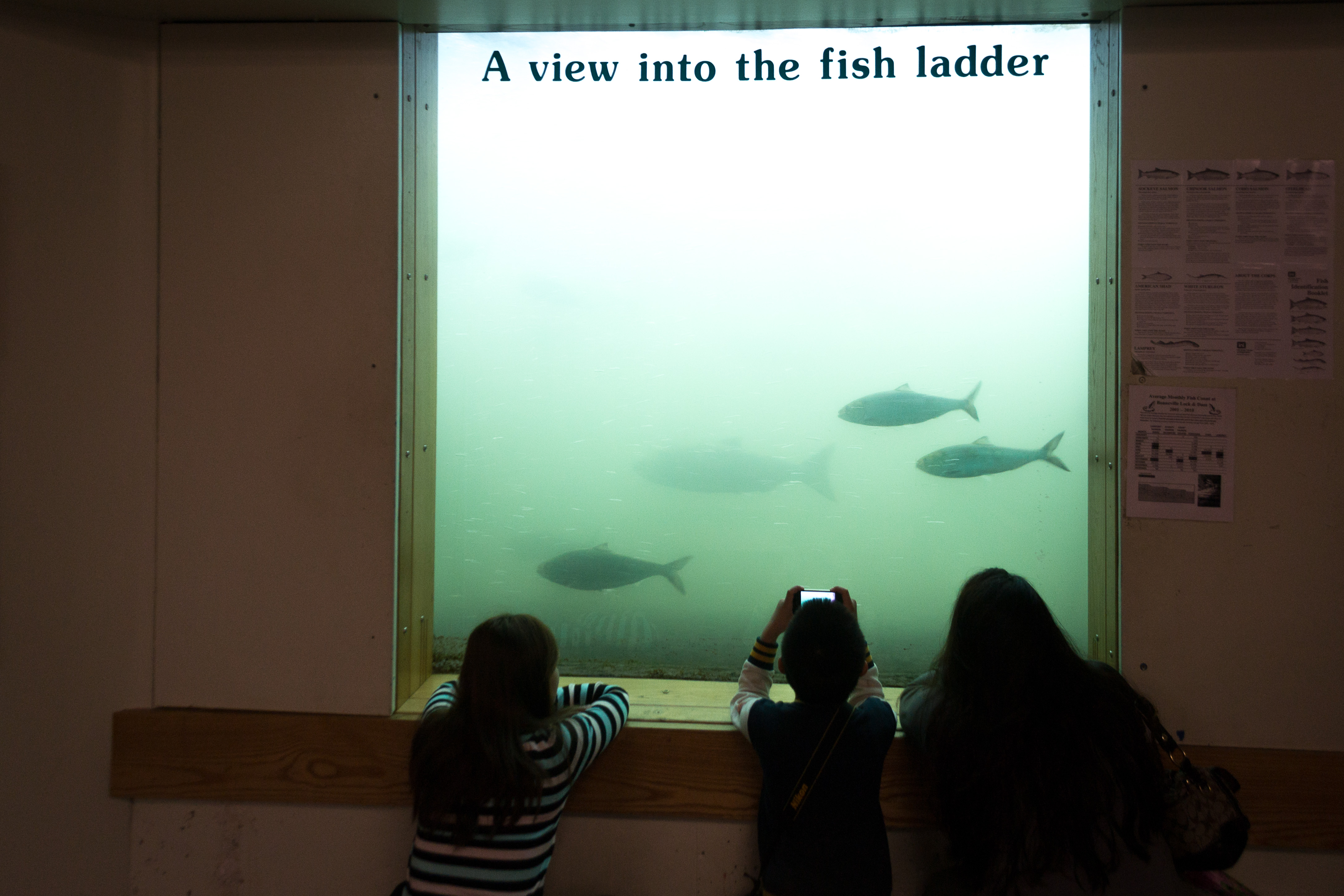
A viewing area of a fish ladder at the Bonneville Dam. The viewing area also shows information signs that highlight the types of fish species moving through the fish ladder and monthly fish counts for several years.

Hydropower plants block fish migration which can adversely affect biodiversity. Fish passageways are used to replenish the affected habit. For example, a project in Southwest Washington reopened 117 miles of salmon and steelhead habitat at its hydroelectric dams. Fish migrating downstream are caught, transported by truck around the three dams and released downstream of the dams. Once adults, a fish ladder and sorting facility allows the fish to migrate upstream.

Another approach, technical fishways, are made with natural material to mimic natural waterways with low slopes and flow and large spaces with low heights for species to move. Technical fishways are constructed to allow fish species to move safely in any direction through barriers. Hydropower plants and their dams can use these types of fishway to adapt to fish species movements and provide efficient maintenance.

== See also ==
- Elver pass – Waterway modification for eels
- Glen D. Palmer Dam – Dam in Yorkville, Illinois
- Fish doorbell – Crowdsourced fish ladder in the Netherlands
- Fish migration – Movement of fishes from one part of a water body to another on a regular basis
- Fish screen
- Pitlochry fish ladder – Structure in Perth and Kinross, Scotland
- Salmon run – Annual migration of salmon

== General and cited references ==
- To Save the Salmon (1997) US Army Corps of Engineers.
- Fish-friendly waterways and culverts - Integration of hydrodynamics and fish turbulence interplay (2017) The University of Queensland.
