= Pitlochry Station Bookshop =

Bookshop at Pitlochry railway station, Scotland

Pitlochry Station Bookshop is located at Pitlochry railway station, a Category A listed station in Pitlochry, Perth and Kinross, Scotland. The station was first opened in 1863 at the same time as the railway line from Perth to Inverness. It won the ‘Station of the Year (Medium)’ award in 2019 at the National Rail Awards in London.

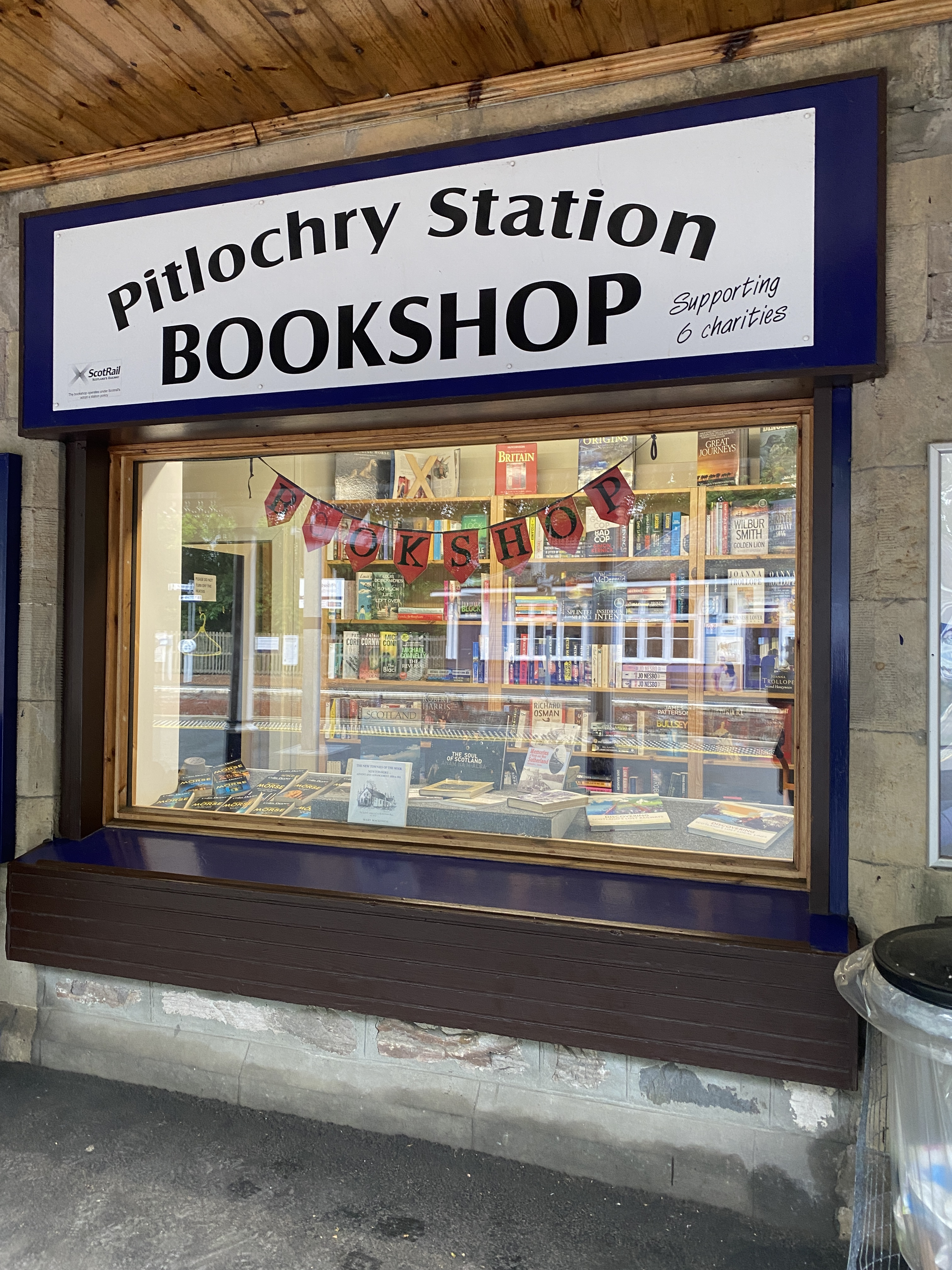
Pitlochry Station Bookshop

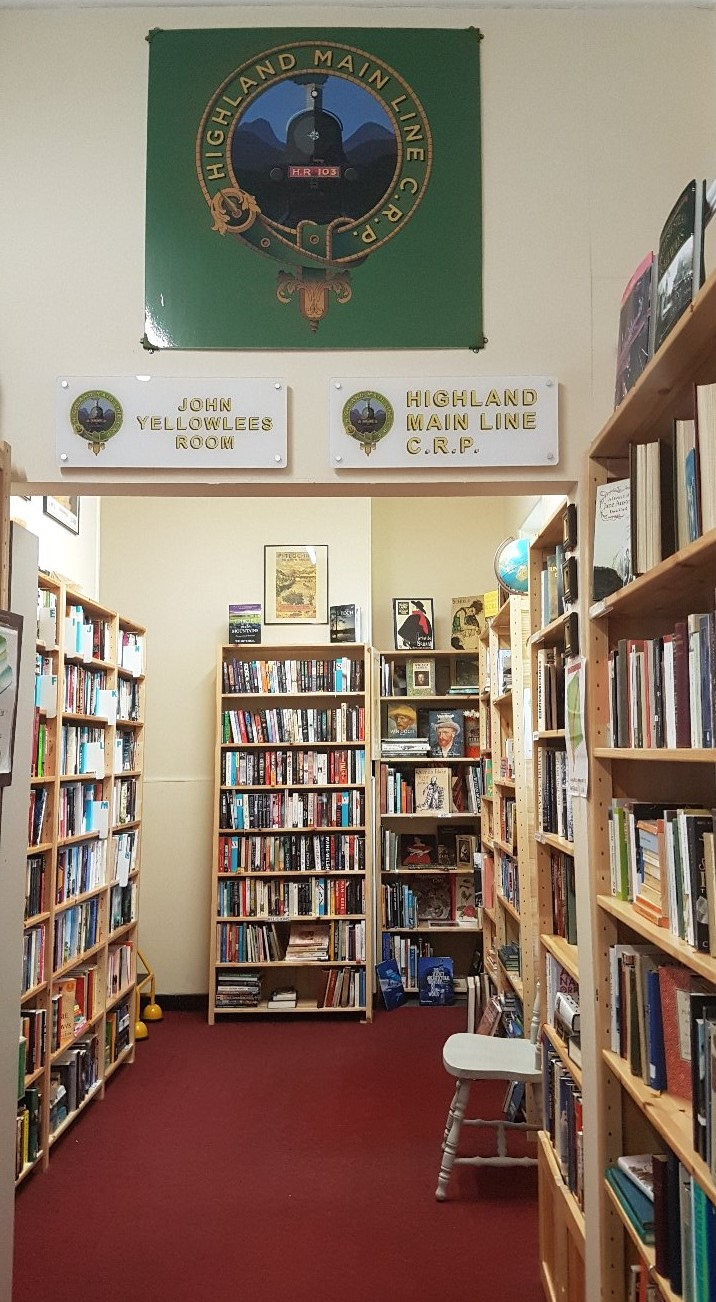
Pitlochry Station Bookshop interior

== History ==
The bookshop was launched in 2005, after a local councillor, the late Eleanor Howie, publicised ScotRail's new ‘Adopt-a-Station’ scheme and asked the public for ideas on how to revive the empty buildings at Pitlochry Station. Three local women – Priscilla Lorimer, Elizabeth Templeton and Nancy Cameron – came forward with a plan to raise money for charity by selling second-hand books to rail travellers. They began with a few boxes of books for sale in the waiting room and soon the premises expanded, as ScotRail offered the old John Menzies newspaper stall to the group. When they outgrew that, the old station master's office was added to make the bookshop that we know today. In 2019, the bookshop expanded even further, taking over the old salt store-room to become a much-needed book-store where donated books are checked, priced and held until going to be sold, either in the bookshop or to one of our specialist buyers or online through eBay.

== Ethos ==
All the money that is raised by the bookshop goes to charity. There are no paid staff; all the staff and committee members are volunteers. ScotRail gives the premises rent-free, and the only outlays are for essentials such as electricity, insurance, and maintenance.

== Charities ==
The bookshop supports six charities, each chosen to reflect a balance between local, national and international concerns. The current charities are:

- Cancer Research UK
- Children's Hospice Association Scotland (CHAS)
- Highland Perthshire Shopmobility
- Mercy Corps
- Scotland's Charity Air Ambulance
- Tayside Mountain Rescue

In 2017, the bookshop's work for charity was recognised when it was awarded the title of ‘Voluntary Fundraising Group of the Year’ by the Chartered Institute of Fundraising Scotland. The following year, it reached a milestone of £250,000 raised for charity. By 2021, the total amount raised by the bookshop exceeded £350,000. One of the bookshop's charities, CHAS, celebrated acceptance of its share with a special award ceremony held in Pitlochry.
