= Moulin, Scotland =

Coordinates: 56.7127°N 3.7263°W

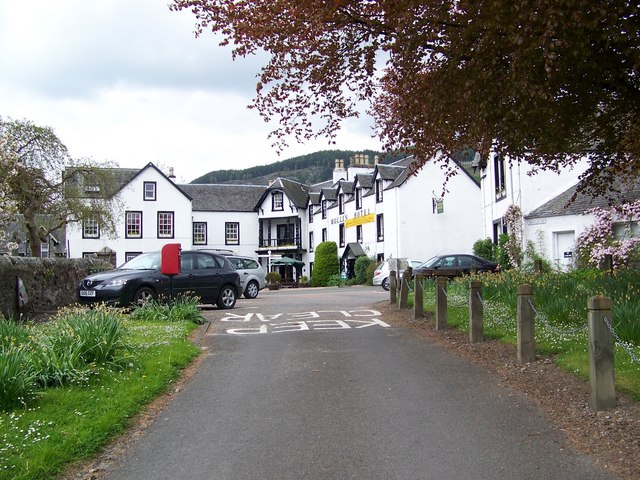
Moulin Hotel, dating from 1695

Moulin is a village in Perthshire in central Scotland. It lies in the Tummel valley, 1 kilometre (0.62 mi) north of Pitlochry, and 40 kilometres (25 mi) north of Perth.

The Black Castle of Moulin is the ruined remains of a 14th-century castle, built on a former island. The castle was burned down in 1512.

Moulin Kirk was the parish church of the area from the Middle Ages. The church was granted to the monks of Dunfermline Abbey by William the Lion, King of the Scots from 1165 to 1214. In 1873 the church was gutted by fire and the present building was constructed. In 1989 the church was closed, and the parish church is now Pitlochry Church of Scotland.

Rev Adam Fergusson was minister of the parish from 1736 to 1785, serving as Moderator of the General Assembly of the Church of Scotland in 1772.

Robert Louis Stevenson stayed at the Fisher Hotel in Pitlochry in June 1881 with his wife Fanny and his mother; the party then moved to Kinnaird Cottage in Moulin. Here Stevenson worked on "Thrawn Janet" (1881), "The Merry Men" (1882) and "The Body Snatcher" (1884).
