= Pitlochry =

Town in Perth and Kinross, Scotland

Coordinates: 56.7050°N 3.7330°W

Pitlochry: Scottish Gaelic: Baile Chloichridh; Scots: Pitlochry
- Pitlochry Town Hall

- Location within Perth and Kinross
- Population: 2,694 (2022)
- OS grid reference: NN941582
  - Edinburgh: 56 mi (90 km)
  - London: 388 mi (624 km)
- Civil parish: Moulin
- Council area: Perth and Kinross
- Lieutenancy area: Perth and Kinross
- Country: Scotland
- Sovereign state: United Kingdom
- Post town: PITLOCHRY
- Postcode district: PH16
- Dialling code: 01796
- Police: Scotland
- Fire: Scottish
- Ambulance: Scottish
- UK Parliament: Angus and Perthshire Glens
- Scottish Parliament: Perthshire North

Pitlochry (/pɪtˈlɒxri/; Scottish Gaelic: Baile Chloichridh or Baile Chloichrigh) is a historic market town in the Perth and Kinross council area of Scotland, lying on the River Tummel. It is historically in the county of Perthshire, and had a population of 2,694 in 2022.

It is largely a Victorian town, which developed into a tourist resort after Queen Victoria and Prince Albert visited the area in 1842 and bought a highland estate at Balmoral, and the arrival of the railway in 1863. It remains a popular tourist resort today and is particularly known for its Pitlochry Festival Theatre, salmon ladder and as a centre for hillwalking, surrounded by mountains such as Ben Vrackie and Schiehallion. It is popular as a base for coach holidays. The town has retained many stone Victorian buildings, and the high street has an unusual period cast iron canopy over one side.

== History ==
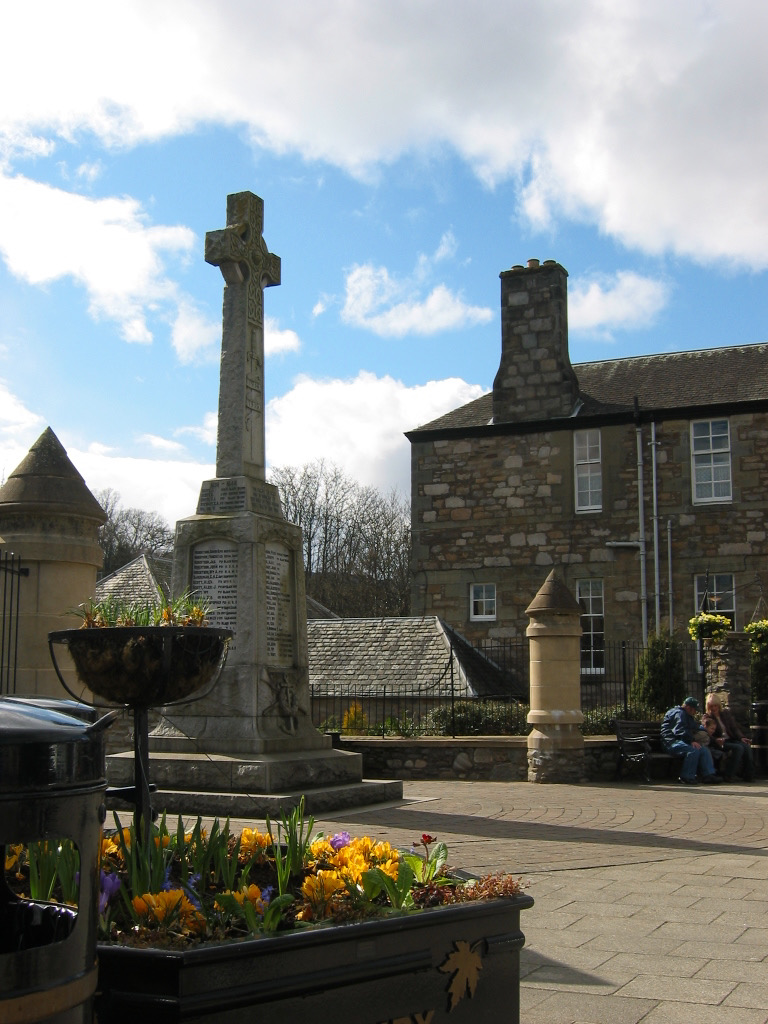
A war memorial, which stands just in front of the town's Memorial Garden, commemorates both world wars. It was unveiled and dedicated in 1922

Pitlochry today dates largely from Victorian times, although the areas known as Moulin and Port-na-craig are much older. History records that Moulin Kirk was granted by the Earl of Atholl to Dunfermline Abbey in 1180 and Moulin became a burgh of barony in 1511. Port-na-craig was the site of the original ferry over the River Tummel which operated until the suspension footbridge was built in 1913. Building between these two separate communities followed the construction of the military road north in the 18th century which followed the line of the present main street. Moulin contained the parish school which was attended by Alexander MacKenzie (1822–1892), the second Prime Minister of Canada. This schoolhouse "Blairmount" now operates as a luxury holiday rental.

In 1842 Queen Victoria visited Perthshire on one of her grand tours and her favourable opinion of the area caused the town to be more widely noticed. After its railway station was built in 1863, Pitlochry became a favoured destination for tourists.

Robert Louis Stevenson stayed at Fishers Hotel in June 1881 with his wife Fanny and mother. The party then moved to Kinnaird Cottage in nearby Moulin. Here Stevenson worked on "Thrawn Janet" (1881), "The Merry Men" (1882) and "The Body Snatcher" (1884).

In 1947 Pitlochry became a burgh. That year also saw the beginning of construction of a dam as part of the Tummel hydro-electric power scheme. The dam and its fish ladder are a popular tourist attraction today. The damming of the river created an artificial loch, Loch Faskally, but flooded a large area north of the town including the old Recreation Park, which was relocated to its current position. The new burgh council adopted the local public hall as Pitlochry Town Hall shortly after it was formed.

From the 1960s, Sir Robert Watson-Watt, an inventor of radar, and his wife, Dame Katherine Jane Trefusis Forbes, Director of the Women's Auxiliary Air Force in World War II, lived at her summer house, "The Observatory", in Pitlochry. Both are buried in the churchyard of the Episcopal Church of the Holy Trinity at Pitlochry.

Pitlochry Festival Theatre was founded by John Stewart in 1951, originally situated in a tent in the grounds of Knockendarroch House in Lower Oakfield. The tent became semi-permanent and remained there for 30 years until the current building at Port-na-craig opened in 1981.

The town was awarded a Gold Medal in the 2009 Britain in Bloom horticultural contest, and outright winner in the category of Small Town.

== Governance ==
Pitlochry is part of the Perth and Kinross council area. The Scottish Parliamentary constituency is Perthshire North, represented by John Swinney of the Scottish National Party. The UK Parliament constituency is Angus and Perthshire Glens. The MP is Dave Doogan, also of the Scottish National Party.

== Demography ==
At the 2022 Scottish census, Pitlochry had a population of 2,694, which ended up being a decrease from the 2011 census. In 2011, 29.2% of residents were reported as being 65 years old or older – significantly higher than 16.8% for Scotland as a whole. The median ages for females and males were 51 and 49 respectively, compared to 42 and 40 for the whole of Scotland.

== Economy ==
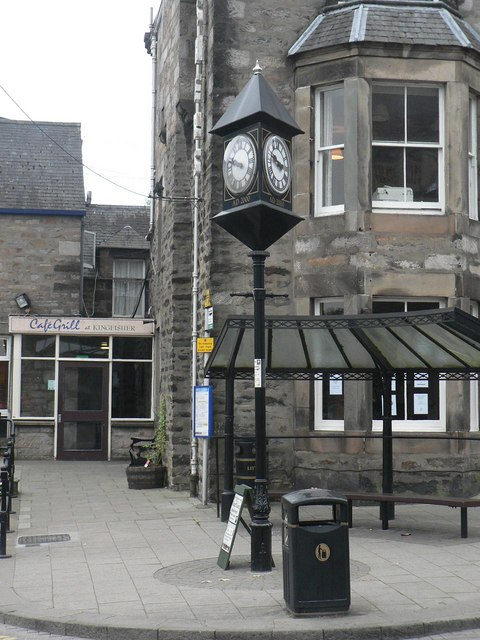
Town clock

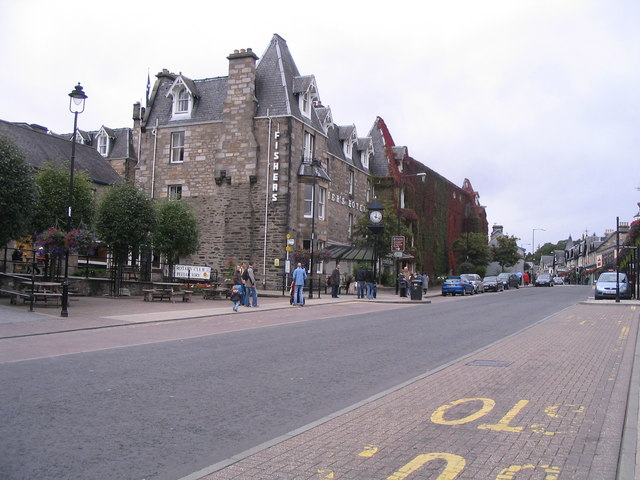
Fishers Hotel on Atholl Road

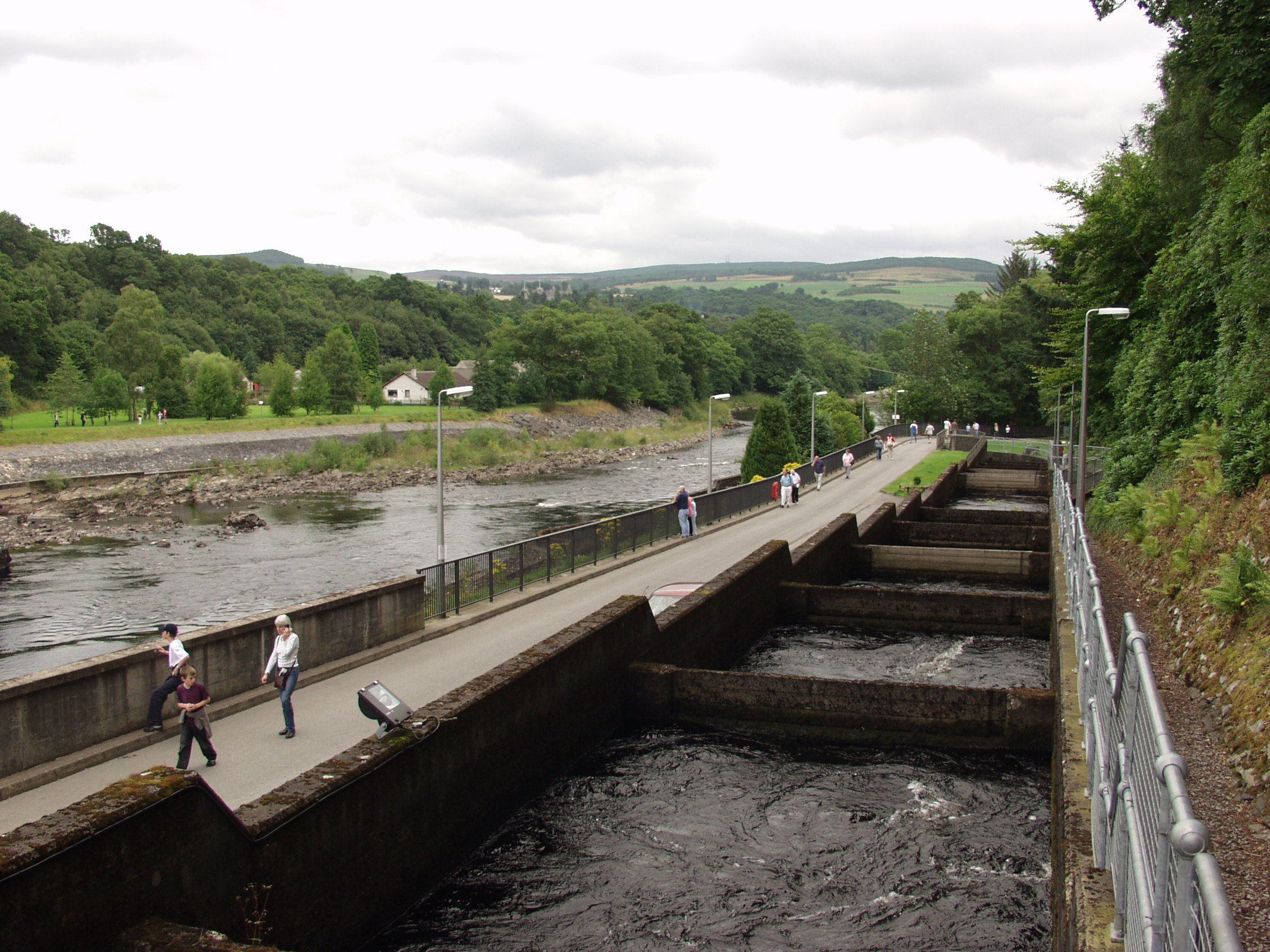
Fish ladder in Pitlochry

The town has two whisky distilleries. Edradour is the smallest legal distillery in Scotland, and Blair Athol Distillery, which has a popular visitor centre, dates back to 1798. Edradour sits to the east of town at the foot of the Moulin Moor. It is privately owned and produces only 12 casks per week with a production workforce of three men. Relatively unchanged since it started making whisky, it is the last example of a traditional distillery and not currently open to visitors. Blair Athol sits on the main road at the southeast of town and since 1933 has been owned by Bell's, now part of the Diageo group.

Pitlochry station is home to Pitlochry Station Bookshop. The bookshop was set up in 2005 and is situated on Platform 1.

The power station's dam is known for its 310-metre salmon ladder; fish can be viewed swimming from weir to weir within the ladder, via an underwater viewing station or a video from inside the visitor centre. Over 5,000 salmon pass through annually. The dam and power station were completed in 1951 as the last link in the Tummel hydro-electric power scheme which comprises nine power stations and reservoirs. The new reservoir, which was named Loch Faskally, was built across the River Tummel, flooding a large area upstream.

== Churches ==
There are a number of churches in Pitlochry, including the Church of Scotland Parish Church of Pitlochry Church of Scotland on Church Road which was built in 1884. Holy Trinity, an Episcopal Church at the eastern end of Pitlochry, was built in 1858. Pitlochry Baptist Church, built in 1884, is situated at the east end of the main street. There is a Roman Catholic church, St Bride's, at Rie-achan near Loch Faskally which was established in 1949 as a temporary facility for workers building the dam and power-station there. However, when the workers moved on the chapel remained and following a fire a new church was built and opened in 1969 and serves the local Catholics and large number of Summer visitors.

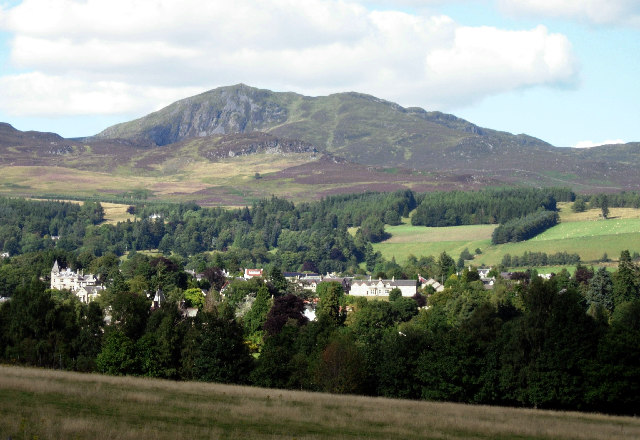
Ben Vrackie, at 841 m (2,759 ft), dominates the scenery around Pitlochry. The view is from the A9 looking north and shows part of the town of Pitlochry.

== Pitlochry Power Station ==
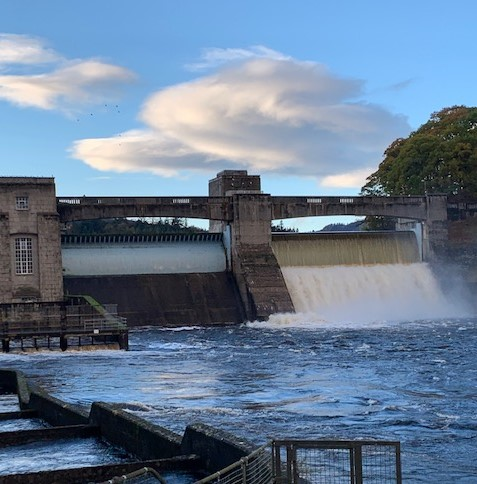
Water flowing over the Pitlochry Dam

Pitlochry was one of the pioneer schemes for hydro-electricity. The Pitlochry Dam was proposed in 1947 by the newly created Hydro Electric Board. Designs were drawn up by Harold Tarbolton. Tarbolton was responsible for the power station but died soon after, and the scheme was then completed by architect T. H. Eley, being built by Sir Alexander Gibb and Partners. As a very early acknowledgement of ecological needs the scheme included the ingenious Pitlochry fish ladder to allow spawning salmon to bypass the dam.

== Transport ==
=== Road ===
The town, which lies 26 miles (42 km) north of Perth, has been bypassed by the main A9 Inverness to Perth road since 1981.

=== Rail ===
Pitlochry railway station is located on the Highland Main Line.

=== Walking ===
The town lies at the eastern end of the Rob Roy Way, a long distance footpath that runs from Drymen.

== Arts and culture ==
Pitlochry Festival Theatre, left, and Dam, right

In 1951, John Stewart created the Pitlochry Festival Theatre, originally held in a tent. A purpose built structure was created at Portnacraig near the River Tummel designed by Law & Dunbar-Nasmith in 1979 and completed in 1981.

The Winter Words Festival, first held in 2004, is a 10-day literary festival that takes place every year in early February. Most events take place at the Pitlochry Festival Theatre, which attracts over 40 authors, broadcasters, wordsmiths and personalities.

The sound and light show, The Enchanted Forest, takes place in Pitlochry's nearby Faskally Wood every year in October, attracting 70,000 visitors to the town.

Every Monday during the summer, the Vale of Atholl Pipe Band, hosts a traditional evening of music, dancing and song, beginning and ending with a short parade along the high street.

== Climate ==
As with the rest of the British Isles, Pitlochry experiences a maritime climate with mild summers and cool winters. The nearest official Met Office weather station for which online records are available is Faskally, about 2 miles (3 km) north-west of the town centre. Typically the warmest day of the year will rise to 26.3 °C (79.3 °F) and the coldest night will fall to −10.6 °C (12.9 °F). Pitlochry is notable for its range in temperature on 9 May 1978. The temperature in the morning was recorded as −7 °C (19 °F), rising to 22 °C (72 °F) in the afternoon, giving a range of 29 °C (52 °F). This is one of the biggest daily temperature ranges in the United Kingdom.

Climate data for Faskally, (94 m asl, averages 1971–2000, extremes 1960–present)
Month	Jan	Feb	Mar	Apr	May	Jun	Jul	Aug	Sep	Oct	Nov	Dec	Year
Record high °C (°F)	13.7 (56.7)	14.5 (58.1)	19.4 (66.9)	23.5 (74.3)	27.1 (80.8)	29.7 (85.5)	30.0 (86.0)	28.7 (83.7)	26.8 (80.2)	21.8 (71.2)	18.6 (65.5)	14.4 (57.9)	30.0 (86.0)
Mean daily maximum °C (°F)	5.4 (41.7)	6.1 (43.0)	8.4 (47.1)	11.4 (52.5)	14.8 (58.6)	17.3 (63.1)	19.2 (66.6)	18.6 (65.5)	15.5 (59.9)	11.8 (53.2)	8.0 (46.4)	6.0 (42.8)	11.9 (53.4)
Mean daily minimum °C (°F)	−0.9 (30.4)	−0.4 (31.3)	0.9 (33.6)	2.6 (36.7)	5.0 (41.0)	8.1 (46.6)	10.3 (50.5)	9.8 (49.6)	7.6 (45.7)	4.7 (40.5)	1.2 (34.2)	−0.3 (31.5)	4.1 (39.3)
Record low °C (°F)	−19.6 (−3.3)	−13.3 (8.1)	−13.9 (7.0)	−7.2 (19.0)	−7 (19)	−1.1 (30.0)	1.5 (34.7)	0.0 (32.0)	−2.5 (27.5)	−5.7 (21.7)	−12.6 (9.3)	−18.2 (−0.8)	−19.6 (−3.3)
Average precipitation mm (inches)	112.6 (4.43)	70.14 (2.76)	79.83 (3.14)	46.58 (1.83)	59.67 (2.35)	54.27 (2.14)	61.56 (2.42)	66.65 (2.62)	79.26 (3.12)	94.52 (3.72)	89.32 (3.52)	94.33 (3.71)	908.73 (35.76)
Source: Royal Dutch Meteorological Institute/KNMI

== Sport ==
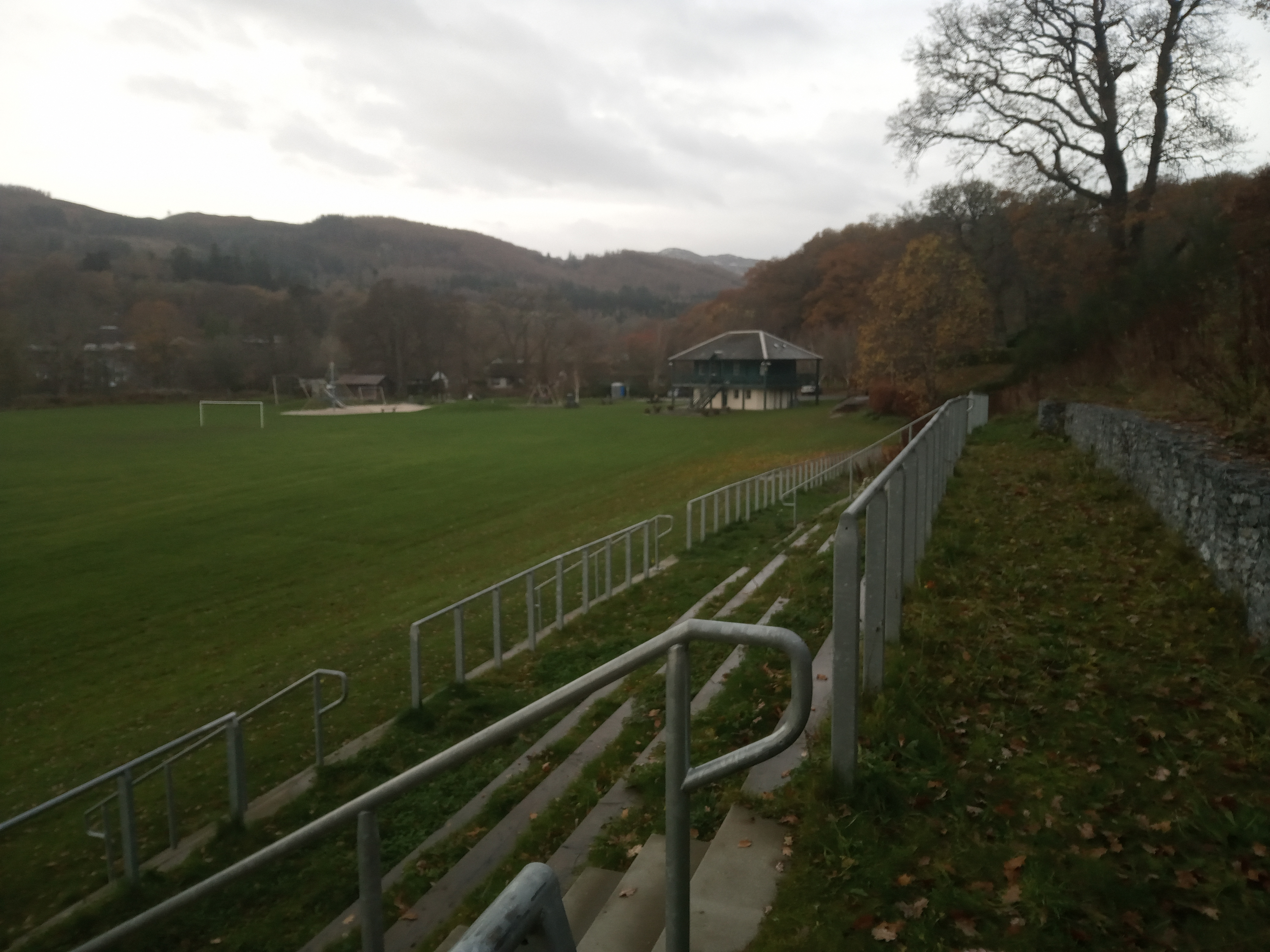
Pitlochry Recreation Park with spectator terracing and pavilion.

Pitlochry is home to the Vale of Atholl Football Club. The "Vale" were founded in 1879 and originally played at the old recreation park now situated at the bottom of Loch Faskally. Relocating along with the pavilion in the 1950s when the dam was built to the current location the Vale were regular competitors in the Scottish Cup in the past having played ties against the likes of Dundee and Hibernian. The Vale's most famous former player is Paul Sturrock, who remains a committed Vale supporter. The Vale's only First Division championship victory was in the 1990s but recently tasted Second Division success in 2004/5.

The Atholl Highlanders rugby team, established in 2007, also play at The Recreation Park.

Pitlochry Highland Games has been held annually on the second Saturday of September since 1852 and is the last event in the Scottish Highland Games calendar. In 1852 the original Recreation Park was formed on the north bank of the Tummel at the foot of Rie-Achan Road across what is now known as Lady's Dell. However, with the building of the dam, the old park was flooded in 1950 and the Games moved to the new and current Recreation Park. The original pavilion had been dismantled and was re-erected for 1951. It remains unchanged externally today but was upgraded internally in 1964. A feature of the Games is the Pipe Band Championship which attracts a large entry and culminates in the unique Massed Pipe Band parade at the end of the day.

Eve Muirhead, the Olympic curler, played at a club in Pitlochry before the demolition of the curling rink.

== Twin town ==
Pitlochry is twinned with:

Confolens, Charente, France.
