= List of Category A listed buildings in Perth and Kinross =

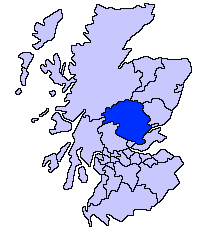
Perth and Kinross shown within Scotland

This is a list of Category A listed buildings in Perth and Kinross, Scotland.

In Scotland, the term listed building refers to a building or other structure officially designated as being of "special architectural or historic interest". Category A structures are those considered to be "buildings of national or international importance, either architectural or historic, or fine little-altered examples of some particular period, style or building type." Listing was begun by a provision in the Town and Country Planning (Scotland) Act 1947, and the current legislative basis for listing is the Planning (Listed Buildings and Conservation Areas) (Scotland) Act 1997. The authority for listing rests with Historic Scotland, an executive agency of the Scottish Government, which inherited this role from the Scottish Development Department in 1991. Once listed, severe restrictions are imposed on the modifications allowed to a building's structure or its fittings. Listed building consent must be obtained from local authorities prior to any alteration to such a structure. There are approximately 47,400 listed buildings in Scotland, of which around 8% (some 3,800) are Category A.

The council area of Perth and Kinross covers 5,286 square kilometres (2,041 sq mi), and has a population of around 144,200. There are 195 Category A listed buildings in the area.

== Listed buildings ==
Name	Location	Date listed	Geo-coordinates	Notes	LB number	Image
Canal Street and Tay Street, Greyfriars Burial Ground including Gates and Boundary Walls	Perth		56°23′37″N 3°25′38″W		39338	Upload another image
Bridge of Ruim	Over Quiech Burn east of Alyth		56°37′47″N 3°11′32″W	Early-18th-century packhorse bridge	53	Upload Photo
Old Fincastle House	Glen Fincastle, south of Blair Atholl		56°44′15″N 3°51′09″W	17th-century house	69	Upload Photo
Stobhall, Sundial No. 2	North-east of Stanley		56°29′40″N 3°24′38″W	17th-century faceted sundial	79	Upload Photo
Drummonie House	South-west of Bridge of Earn		56°20′16″N 3°25′47″W	Late-17th- or early-18th-century house	163	Upload another image
Balhary House	South of Alyth		56°36′20″N 3°12′00″W	Late Georgian country house	4379	Upload Photo
Bridge of Isla	Over River Isla near Meikleour		56°31′40″N 3°21′40″W	Late-18th-century five-arch bridge	4424	Upload another image
Gourdie House	Craigie		56°33′52″N 3°25′46″W	18th-century house	4440	Upload another image See more images
Meikleour Mercat Cross	Meikleour		56°32′25″N 3°22′18″W	mercat cross dated 1698	4446	Upload another image
Stanley Mills, Bell Mill (or West Mill)	Stanley		56°28′45″N 3°26′27″W	Cotton mill of 1787, brick with iron columns, "perhaps the finest and best-preserved cotton mill with which Sir Richard Arkwright was concerned"	4486	Upload another image See more images
Stanley Mills, Mid Mill	Stanley		56°28′44″N 3°26′26″W	Cotton mill of c. 1823, contains "probably the oldest cotton-spinning machinery in Scotland"	4489	Upload another image
Kilgraston House	Bridge of Earn		56°20′30″N 3°24′59″W	Georgian house of c. 1793	4527	Upload another image See more images
Aberuchill Castle	Strathearn, west of Comrie		56°21′58″N 4°02′00″W	17th-century tower house with later additions	5296	Upload another image See more images
Comrie Old Parish Church	Comrie		56°22′26″N 3°59′19″W	Gothic church of 1805	5385	Upload another image See more images
1 Dunira Street	Comrie		56°22′27″N 3°59′17″W	Shop and offices, 1904 by Charles Rennie Mackintosh	5393	Upload another image See more images
Balmanno Castle	Aberargie		56°19′29″N 3°23′11″W	16th-century tower house	5422	Upload another image See more images
Ecclesiamagirdle House	South-west of Bridge of Earn		56°19′53″N 3°26′42″W	17th-century T-plan house	5427	Upload Photo
Ecclesiamagirdle House: Dovecot	South-west of Bridge of Earn		56°19′53″N 3°26′41″W	17th-century circular dovecote	5430	Upload Photo
Balvaird Castle	Ochil Hills, east of Glenfarg		56°17′20″N 3°20′34″W	Late-15th-century tower house	5466	Upload another image See more images
Stobhall Chapel Block	North-east of Stanley		56°29′36″N 3°24′41″W	16th-century chapel and tower house	5473	Upload another image
Stobhall Laundry, Brewhouse and Bakehouse	North-east of Stanley		56°29′36″N 3°24′41″W	16th- 17th-century vernacular buildings	5474	Upload Photo
Stobhall Dowery House	North-east of Stanley		56°29′36″N 3°24′40″W	17th-century house	5475	Upload another image
Stobhall New Library	North-east of Stanley		56°29′35″N 3°24′42″W	1965 replica of earlier building	5477	Upload Photo
Stobhall, Sundial No. 1	North-east of Stanley		56°29′37″N 3°24′40″W	Possibly 17th-century	5479	Upload Photo
Dunkeld Bridge	Over River Tay at Dunkeld		56°33′50″N 3°35′07″W	Seven-arch bridge of 1809, by Thomas Telford	5620	Upload another image See more images
Dunkeld Cathedral	Dunkeld		56°33′54″N 3°35′24″W	Oldest parts are 13th-century, with additions of the 14th, 15th, 17 and 19th centuries	5631	Upload another image See more images
Blackcraig Bridge	Over River Ardle on Blackcraig Castle drive		56°39′57″N 3°27′23″W	19th-century bridge with picturesque gatehouses	5674	Upload another image
Ardblair Castle	Blairgowrie		56°35′07″N 3°21′48″W	17th- 18th-century tower house and courtyard	5677	Upload another image See more images
Cleish Castle	Cleish Hills, south of Kinross		56°09′56″N 3°28′45″W	16th-century tower house	5711	Upload another image See more images
Blair Adam	Kelty		56°08′46″N 3°24′11″W	House of 1733 by William Adam	5715	Upload Photo
Tummel Bridge	Over River Tummel west of Loch Tummel		56°42′28″N 4°01′23″W	Single-arch bridge by George Wade, c. 1734	5742	Upload another image See more images
Monzie Castle	Crieff		56°23′57″N 3°49′35″W	17th-century tower house with 18th-century range	5779	Upload another image See more images
Innerpeffray Library	Innerpeffray, by Crieff		56°20′41″N 3°46′42″W	Purpose-built library completed 1762	5792	Upload another image See more images
Montrose Mausoleum	Aberuthven, St Kattan's Churchyard		56°19′02″N 3°39′40″W	Mausoleum of the Dukes of Montrose, designed by John Adam in 1736	5819	Upload another image See more images
Clunie Castle	Loch of Clunie, Clunie		56°34′47″N 3°26′43″W	Ruined 16th-century tower house	5843	Upload another image See more images
Keltie Castle	Dunning		56°18′05″N 3°36′19″W	17th-century tower house with later alterations	5912	Upload Photo
Duncrub House: Dovecot	Dunning		56°19′01″N 3°35′39″W	18th-century dovecote	5915	Upload another image
Parish Church of St. Serf	Dunning		56°18′45″N 3°35′14″W	Medieval church	52454	Upload another image See more images
Auchleeks House	Trinafour		56°45′23″N 4°03′37″W	Late Georgian house	6054	Upload Photo
Blair Castle, Front Lodge	Blair Atholl		56°46′01″N 3°50′45″W	1869 lodge by David Bryce	6064	Upload another image
Blair Castle, River Tilt Grotto	On River Tilt, Blair Atholl		56°46′29″N 3°50′29″W	18th-century Gothic viewpoint at York Cascade	6065	Upload Photo
Blair Castle	Blair Atholl		56°46′24″N 3°51′27″W	15th-century tower house with 16th- and 17th-century additions, remodelled by David Bryce in the 19th century	6074	Upload another image See more images
Blair Castle, Walled Garden, Sundial	Blair Atholl		56°46′24″N 3°51′32″W	Brass sundial of 1743	6076	Upload another image
Keithick House	Burrelton		56°31′56″N 3°17′50″W	Early-19th-century Neoclassical house	6170	Upload Photo
Stanley Mills, East Mill	Stanley		56°28′45″N 3°26′23″W	19th-century cotton mill	6690	Upload another image See more images
Megginch Castle	Errol		56°24′27″N 3°13′48″W	15th-century tower house with later additions, including a wing by Robert Adam	10963	Upload another image See more images
Megginch Castle, Stables	Errol		56°24′29″N 3°13′51″W	Early-19th-century Gothic stable courtyard	10964	Upload Photo
Megginch Castle, North Lodges	Errol		56°24′38″N 3°14′30″W	Late-18th-century gatehouse lodges	10969	Upload another image
Balthayock House, Bridge over Hail Pool	North-west of Glencarse		56°23′35″N 3°20′00″W	Cast-iron bridge c. 1870, on north-east drive of Balthayock House	10986	Upload Photo
Forteviot Square	Forteviot		56°20′26″N 3°32′10″W	U-plan group of single-storey houses by James Miller, 1925	11057	Upload another image
Forteviot Hall	Forteviot		56°20′25″N 3°32′07″W	Village hall by James Miller, 1925	11058	Upload another image
Invermay House	South of Forteviot		56°19′40″N 3°31′14″W	Mid 18th-century Georgian house	11071	Upload Photo
Old House of Invermay	South of Forteviot		56°19′44″N 3°31′13″W	Late-16th-century tower house	11074	Upload Photo
Hermitage Bridge	Over River Braan at The Hermitage, Dunkeld		56°33′26″N 3°36′51″W	Rustic stone arch bridge, c. 1785	11104	Upload another image See more images
Dalguise Viaduct	Over River Tay at Dalguise		56°36′45″N 3°38′21″W	Lattice-girder railway viaduct of 1863, by Joseph Mitchell	11117	Upload another image See more images
Dunkeld & Birnam railway station	Dunkeld and Birnam		56°33′25″N 3°34′42″W	Gothic station building of 1856, by Andrew Heiton Jr.	11139	Upload another image See more images
Murthly Castle, Roman Bridge	Over Birnam Burn, Murthly		56°32′18″N 3°32′06″W	Mid 19th-century six-arch bridge in the style of a Roman aqueduct	11145	Upload Photo
Murthly Castle	Murthly		56°32′20″N 3°30′47″W	16th-century tower house with later additions	11146	Upload another image See more images
Murthly Castle, Walled Garden	Murthly		56°32′28″N 3°30′38″W	Walled garden dating to the 17th century	11147	Upload Photo
Kinross House	Kinross		56°12′11″N 3°24′35″W	Begun in 1686, by Sir William Bruce	11200	Upload another image See more images
Dalreoch Bridge	Over River Earn north of Dunning		56°20′34″N 3°36′47″W	18th-century four-arch bridge	11211	Upload Photo
Kinnaird Castle	Kinnaird, Gowrie		56°26′46″N 3°13′57″W	Tower house of c. 1500	11218	Upload another image See more images
Kirk O' The Muir	Murthly		56°31′01″N 3°26′40″W	Disused United Presbyterian Church	11233	Upload Photo
Hilton House	Bridge of Earn		56°21′53″N 3°25′55″W	Little-altered house of 1732	11329	Upload Photo
Tulliebole Castle	Crook of Devon		56°11′18″N 3°31′41″W	16th-century tower house	11459	Upload another image See more images
Aldie Castle	Crook of Devon		56°09′48″N 3°31′52″W	16th-century tower house	11469	Upload another image See more images
Errol Parish Church	Errol		56°23′35″N 3°12′44″W	18th-century Gothic church by James Gillespie Graham	11589	Upload another image See more images
Errol Park House	Errol		56°23′23″N 3°13′13″W	19th-century Renaissance-style house by Alexander Johnston	11598	Upload another image
Errol Park Stables	Errol		56°23′25″N 3°13′15″W	Early-19th-century circular-plan stable courtyard	11599	Upload another image
Seasyde House	Errol		56°24′22″N 3°09′45″W	Country house of c. 1800	11605	Upload Photo
Fingask Castle sundial	Rait		56°25′58″N 3°15′10″W	Polyhedral Baroque sundial, possibly 17th-century	11635	Upload Photo
Ballindean House	Inchture		56°27′21″N 3°11′18″W	Classical country house of 1832	11760	Upload another image
Rossie Church	Rossie Priory, Longforgan		56°27′51″N 3°09′04″W	Medieval church, rebuilt in the 19th century	11786	Upload Photo
Old Rossie Market Cross	Rossie Priory, Longforgan		56°27′48″N 3°09′01″W	Mercat cross dated 1746	11787	Upload Photo
Grandtully Castle	Grandtully		56°38′27″N 3°48′35″W	Late-16th-century Z-plan tower house	11830	Upload another image See more images
Grandtully Chapel	Grandtully		56°38′03″N 3°48′58″W	16th-century chapel	11831	Upload another image See more images
Logierait Viaduct	Over River Tay at Logierait		56°38′48″N 3°41′01″W	Iron railway viaduct, now used as a road bridge	11851	Upload another image See more images
Kinfauns Castle	East of Perth		56°23′18″N 3°22′39″W	Castellated mansion of 1825, by Sir Robert Smirke	11955	Upload another image See more images
Glendoick House	St Madoes		56°23′53″N 3°17′08″W	Mid 18th-century Georgian house	11966	Upload another image
Taymouth Castle Dairy	Kenmore		56°35′21″N 3°59′19″W	Rustic Italianate ornamental building in white quartz	12091	Upload another image See more images
Taymouth Castle	Kenmore		56°35′41″N 3°58′53″W	Castellated mansion, mainly 19th-century, including work by Archibald Elliot, William Atkinson and James Gillespie Graham	12093	Upload another image See more images
Taymouth Castle, Fort Lodge	Kenmore		56°35′28″N 3°58′18″W	Rustic cottage of late 1830s	12096	Upload Photo
Taymouth Castle, Chinese Bridge	Kenmore		56°35′48″N 3°59′05″W	Early-19th-century cast-iron three-arch bridge	12097	Upload another image See more images
Taymouth Castle, Rustic Lodge	Kenmore		56°36′25″N 3°58′26″W	Rustic cottage of c. 1840	12100	Upload Photo
Kenmore Bridge	Over River Tay at Kenmore		56°35′09″N 4°00′07″W	Seven-arch stone bridge, c. 1774, by John Baxter, possibly working with John Smeaton	12138	Upload another image See more images
Connachan Lodge	North of Crieff		56°25′39″N 3°47′31″W	Early-19th-century Cottage ornée	12213	Upload Photo
Abercairny sundial	Crieff		56°22′52″N 3°45′54″W	17th-century lectern sundial	12257	Upload Photo
All Souls Episcopal Church	Invergowrie Main Street		56°27′39″N 3°03′46″W	Late-19th-century Gothic church by Hippolyte Blanc	12849	Upload another image See more images
HMP Castle Huntly	Longforgan		56°26′56″N 3°08′02″W	Mid 15th-century tower house with 18th-century wings, now an open prison	12868	Upload another image See more images
Castle Huntly, North Gates	Longforgan		56°27′12″N 3°07′49″W	Late-17th-century Renaissance-style gateway	12871	Upload another image See more images
Longforgan Market Cross	Longforgan Main Street		56°27′26″N 3°07′12″W	Later 17th-century mercat cross	13283	Upload another image See more images
Chapel of St Anthony The Eremite	Murthly		56°32′36″N 3°30′43″W	Pre-reformation mortuary chapel, extended by James Gillespie Graham and A W N Pugin in 1846	13460	Upload another image See more images
Marlee House (formerly Kinloch House)	Kinloch, Blairgowrie		56°35′05″N 3°23′14″W	17th-century house, remodelled c. 1746	13742	Upload another image
Inchmartine House	Inchture		56°26′21″N 3°11′52″W	House of c. 1800, incorporating earlier fabric	13773	Upload another image
Taymouth Castle, Maxwell's Temple	Kenmore		56°35′23″N 3°59′43″W	Monument of 1831 by William Atkinson	13804	Upload Photo
Meggernie Castle	Glenlyon		56°35′02″N 4°21′22″W	17th-century tower house	13812	Upload another image See more images
Inchyra House	St Madoes		56°22′38″N 3°18′45″W	Classical country house of c. 1800	17624	Upload another image
Pitfour Castle	St Madoes		56°22′24″N 3°17′52″W	Castellated house of 1784 by Robert Adam	17628	Upload another image See more images
Elcho Castle, Dovecot	Rhynd		56°22′23″N 3°21′23″W	Late-16th-century circular dovecote	17714	Upload another image
Telephone Call Box	Rhynd		56°21′55″N 3°21′51″W	"K3" telephone box, the only one surviving in its original location	17718	Upload another image
Colquhalzie House	East of Muthill		56°20′13″N 3°45′31″W	18th-century country house	17771	Upload Photo
Weem Old Parish Kirk	Weem		56°37′32″N 3°53′15″W	17th-century former church, including the funerary monuments of the Menzies family	17815	Upload another image See more images
Williamston House	South-west of Methven		56°22′46″N 3°39′57″W	Early-17th-century country house	17836	Upload Photo
Glenalmond College Main Building	Glenalmond		56°26′31″N 3°39′36″W	Gothic revival college building, begun in 1846 with later additions	17869	Upload another image See more images
Methven Castle	Methven		56°25′01″N 3°33′18″W	Country house of 1664 by John Mylne	17895	Upload another image See more images
Dalcrue House	Methven		56°26′02″N 3°33′12″W	Italianate house of 1832 by William Henry Playfair	17897	Upload Photo
Dry Bridge	Methven		56°26′16″N 3°32′13″W	Part of Lynedoch estate drive, designed by William Henry Playfair in 1832	17921	Upload another image
Methven Aisle, Methven Parish Church	Methven		56°25′00″N 3°34′51″W	15th-century transept of former collegiate church	17928	Upload Photo
Lochlane House	Crieff		56°22′12″N 3°53′20″W	Small mansion of 1710	18149	Upload Photo
Lawers House	Comrie		56°23′03″N 3°56′47″W	Country house of 1738 by William Adam	18152	Upload another image
Ochtertyre House	Ochtertyre		56°23′26″N 3°52′57″W	Georgian country house of 1790	18170	Upload another image
Belmont Castle	Meigle		56°34′55″N 3°09′49″W	15th-century tower extended in the 18th century, 19th-century alterations	18332	Upload Photo
Scone Palace	Scone		56°25′21″N 3°26′17″W	Early-19th-century rebuilding of earlier house, by William Atkinson	18370	Upload another image See more images
Scone Palace Mortuary Chapel or Mausoleum	Scone Palace		56°25′25″N 3°26′16″W	Remodelling of earlier church aisle by William Atkinson, monument to Viscount Stormont inside	18371	Upload another image
Cottown School House	Cottown		56°22′29″N 3°17′15″W	18th-century thatched building, formerly a school	19809	Upload Photo
Haugh of Drimmie Suspension Bridge	Over River Ericht at Glenericht Lodge Drive		56°38′11″N 3°21′17″W	Wrought iron bridge built before 1837	19830	Upload Photo
Old Scone Market Cross	Scone Palace		56°25′26″N 3°26′06″W	Medieval town cross	19876	Upload another image See more images
Drummond Castle Formal Garden	Muthill		56°20′22″N 3°52′15″W	Walled gardens laid out in 1832, with pavilions and 17th-century sundial	19883	Upload another image
Aberfeldy Water Mill	Aberfeldy		56°37′10″N 3°52′02″W	19th-century water mill, restored in 1988	20859	Upload another image See more images
Tay Bridge	Aberfeldy		56°37′17″N 3°52′25″W	Classically detailed bridge, designed by William Adam and built by General Wade in 1733	20861	Upload another image See more images
Newton Castle	Blairgowrie		56°35′31″N 3°21′01″W	Mid 16th-century Z-plan tower house with later additions	22314	Upload another image See more images
War Memorial	Wellmeadow, Blairgowrie		56°35′30″N 3°20′13″W	World War I memorial, designed by Reginald Fairlie and sculpted by Alexander Carrick	22321	Upload another image
Keathbank Mill	Rattray		56°36′00″N 3°20′27″W	19th-century textile mill	22332	Upload another image See more images
Inchglas	Crieff		56°22′13″N 3°50′19″W	Gothic villa of 1854 by Frederick Thomas Pilkington	23488	Upload Photo
The Avanti Restaurant (former British Linen Bank)	Crieff, 32-34, Crieff High Street		56°22′22″N 3°50′22″W	Offices of 1900 by George Washington Browne	23489	Upload another image See more images
South United Free Church	Crieff		56°22′29″N 3°50′36″W	Later 19th-century Scots Gothic church by J. J. Stevenson	23509	Upload another image See more images
St John's Kirk	Perth		56°23′45″N 3°25′41″W	15th-century church	39300	Upload another image See more images
St Leonard's-in-the-Fields Church	Perth		56°23′33″N 3°25′59″W	Scots Gothic church of 1885 by J. J. Stevenson	39310	Upload another image See more images
St Ninian's Cathedral	Perth		56°23′57″N 3°26′09″W	Mid 19th-century Episcopal cathedral by William Butterfield	39314	Upload another image See more images
King James VI Hospital	Perth		56°23′41″N 3°26′06″W	Former infirmary and school built 1750, one of the finest 18th-century examples of its type in Scotland	39319	Upload another image See more images
Old Perth Academy	Perth		56°24′01″N 3°25′57″W	Former school built 1804, by Robert Reid	39322	Upload another image See more images
York Place, A K Bell Library including Boundary Wall to York Place	Perth		56°23′42″N 3°26′15″W	Neo-classical infirmary by W M Mackenzie, built 1836 and later converted to offices	39323	Upload another image See more images
Perth Sheriff Court	Perth		56°23′40″N 3°25′34″W	Greek Revival court house by Robert Smirke, 1819	39325	Upload another image See more images
Perth Prison, Main Block	Perth		56°23′08″N 3°25′49″W	Central building of 1812 by Robert Reid, radial buildings added in the 1840s and 1850s by Thomas Brown and Robert Matheson	39331	Upload another image
Perth Bridge	Over River Tay at Perth		56°23′56″N 3°25′31″W	Seven-arch bridge by John Smeaton, completed 1771	39339	Upload another image See more images
Perth Water Works	Perth		56°23′32″N 3°25′35″W	Neo-Classical former waterworks, 1832 by Adam Anderson, one of Scotland's most significant industrial buildings, now an art gallery	39341	Upload another image See more images
Pitheavlis Castle	Perth		56°23′20″N 3°27′03″W	Late-16th-century L-plan tower house	39346	Upload another image See more images
2-8 Atholl Crescent	Perth		56°23′57″N 3°25′53″W	Crescent of houses, begun in 1797	39354	Upload another image
2-4 Charlotte Place and 20 Charlotte Street	Perth		56°23′55″N 3°25′44″W	Neo-Greek houses of circa 1830	39392	Upload another image
Barnhill Tollhouse	Perth, Dundee Road		56°23′20″N 3°25′10″W	Early-19th-century toll house	39422	Upload another image See more images
Upper City Mills (now City Mills Hotel)	Perth		56°23′51″N 3°26′12″W	18th-century water mill	39577	Upload Photo
Lower City Mills	Perth		56°23′51″N 3°26′08″W	Early-19th-century water mill	39578	Upload another image See more images
Bank of Scotland	St John Street, Perth		56°23′45″N 3°25′38″W	Italian Renaissance bank offices of 1846 by David Rhind	39618	Upload another image See more images
Pitlochry Parish Church	Pitlochry		56°42′15″N 3°43′58″W	Romanesque church of 1884 by Charles & Leslie Ower	39850	Upload another image See more images
Sunnybrae Cottage	Pitlochry		56°42′16″N 3°44′19″W	Cruck-framed vernacular cottage of late 18th or early 19th century	39866	Upload another image See more images
Pitlochry railway station	Pitlochry		56°42′09″N 3°44′08″W	Station buildings built 1890	39867	Upload another image See more images
Castle Menzies	Weem		56°37′26″N 3°53′49″W	16th-century Z-plan tower house	43568	Upload another image See more images
Stobhall, Folly	North-east of Stanley		56°29′41″N 3°24′38″W	Summer house built in 1989 to incorporate earlier 18th-century panelling	43856	Upload Photo
Pitlochry Power Station, dam and fish ladder	Loch Faskally, Pitlochry		56°41′56″N 3°44′24″W	Mid 20th-century hydro-electric power station	47534	Upload another image See more images
Clunie Power Station	Loch Faskally		56°43′01″N 3°46′41″W	Mid 20th-century hydro-electric power station	47621	Upload another image
Cultybraggan Former Cadet Camp, Huts 19 and 20 (Guard's Block) and 44, 45, 46	Comrie		56°21′21″N 3°59′39″W	Purpose-built World War II Prisoner of War camp, one of the best-preserved in Britain	50471	Upload another image

== See also ==
- Scheduled monuments in Perth and Kinross
