= Aldie =

Aldie may refer to:

- Hill of Aldie, Aberdeenshire, Scotland
- Aldie, Virginia, United States
- Aldie, Highland, Scotland
- Aldie Castle, a Category A listed building in Perth and Kinross, Scotland

== See also ==
- Aldi, a supermarket chain based in Germany
