= Cottown =

Cottown may refer to:

- Cottown, Aberdeenshire, Scotland
- Cottown, Perth and Kinross, Scotland
