= List of listed buildings in Blairgowrie And Rattray, Perth and Kinross =

This is a list of listed buildings in the parish of Blairgowrie and Rattray in Perth and Kinross, Scotland.

== List ==
Name	Location	Date listed	Grid ref. (Note: Sometimes known as OSGB36, the grid reference (where provided) is based on the British national grid reference system used by the Ordnance Survey. • "Guide to National Grid". Ordnance Survey. • "Get-a-map". Ordnance Survey.)	Geo-coordinates	Notes	LB number (Note: Historic Environment Scotland assign a unique alphanumeric identifier to each designated site in Scotland, for listed buildings this always begins with "LB", for example "LB12345".)	Image
Kirk Wynd, Tulach Including Ancillary Buildings, Boundary Walls, Gatepiers And Gates				56°35′41″N 3°20′27″W	Category B	22291	Upload Photo
23 - 27 (Odd Nos) High Street				56°35′33″N 3°20′24″W	Category C(S)	22295	Upload Photo
20 And 22 Brown Street				56°35′33″N 3°20′28″W	Category B	22307	Upload Photo
John Street, St Stephen's Roman Catholic Primary School Including Boundary Walls, Gatepiers And Gates				56°35′33″N 3°20′42″W	Category B	22313	Upload Photo
29 And 30 Wellmeadow, Bank Buildings				56°35′29″N 3°20′15″W	Category B	22319	Upload Photo
31, 32 And 33 Wellmeadow				56°35′29″N 3°20′15″W	Category B	22320	Upload Photo
Rattray (New), Mount Ericht Road, Bengarth Including Ancillary Building, Boundary Walls And Gatepiers				56°35′37″N 3°20′03″W	Category C(S)	22326	Upload Photo
Emma Terrace, Brackenbrae Including Gatepiers, Boundary Walls And Railings				56°35′27″N 3°20′48″W	Category C(S)	49422	Upload Photo
17 And 19 Newton Street Including Boundary Walls, Railings And Gates				56°35′27″N 3°20′36″W	Category C(S)	49437	Upload Photo
Newton Street, Newton Castle, Old Stables And Steading				56°35′32″N 3°21′03″W	Category B	49440	Upload Photo
128 Perth Road, Garfield House Including Boundary Walls, Railings, Gates And Pier				56°35′10″N 3°20′40″W	Category C(S)	49443	Upload Photo
Rattray (New), Balmoral Road, Rosebank House Including Ancillary Building, Gatepiers And Boundary Walls				56°35′47″N 3°20′09″W	Category C(S)	49454	Upload Photo
7 Reform Street, Blairgowrie Printers				56°35′28″N 3°20′26″W	Category B	49477	Upload Photo
53 Allan Street, Royal Hotel				56°35′35″N 3°20′20″W	Category B	22293	Upload another image See more images
26 Brown Street				56°35′34″N 3°20′30″W	Category C(S)	22306	Upload Photo
46 Leslie Street, Council Offices				56°35′28″N 3°20′18″W	Category B	22316	Upload Photo
28 - 32 (Even Nos) Allan Street				56°35′33″N 3°20′19″W	Category C(S)	49418	Upload Photo
John Street, St Stephen's Roman Catholic Church				56°35′31″N 3°20′28″W	Category B	49432	Upload Photo
Newton Street, Embden House Including Boundary Walls				56°35′30″N 3°20′53″W	Category C(S)	49439	Upload Photo
14 - 18 (Even Nos) Perth Street Including Boundary Walls				56°35′27″N 3°20′27″W	Category C(S)	49445	Upload Photo
Rattray New, Hatton Road, Glenshieling House Including Boundary Walls And Gatepiers				56°36′01″N 3°20′18″W	Category C(S)	49469	Upload Photo
Rattray (Old), New Road, Eastfield House				56°35′43″N 3°19′25″W	Category C(S)	49474	Upload Photo
9 Reform Street, Scotcrest Including Boundary Walls				56°35′28″N 3°20′25″W	Category C(S)	49478	Upload Photo
Shaw Street, Greenbank Including Ancillary Building And Gatepiers				56°35′17″N 3°20′46″W	Category C(S)	49479	Upload Photo
Upper Allan Street, Gorsehill Including Boundary Walls, Gatepiers And Gate				56°35′41″N 3°20′30″W	Category C(S)	49481	Upload Photo
Westpark Road, Dalmor And Westerton Including Boundary Walls, Railings And Gates				56°35′03″N 3°20′46″W	Category C(S)	49489	Upload Photo
13 Brown Street, St Catharine's House				56°35′34″N 3°20′27″W	Category C(S)	22301	Upload Photo
7 George Street And 17 Brown Street				56°35′34″N 3°20′29″W	Category B	22302	Upload Photo
28 Brown Street				56°35′34″N 3°20′31″W	Category B	22305	Upload Photo
Brown Street, Town Hall				56°35′32″N 3°20′25″W	Category C(S)	22312	Upload Photo
14 - 20 (Even Nos) Leslie Street, The Dome Restaurant				56°35′30″N 3°20′16″W	Category B	22315	Upload Photo
26, 27 And 28 Wellmeadow				56°35′29″N 3°20′15″W	Category B	22318	Upload Photo
Wellmeadow Gardens, War Memorial				56°35′30″N 3°20′13″W	Category A	22321	Upload another image
Rattray (Old), High Street, Rattray Church Of Scotland Parish Church, Graveyard, Walls, Gatepiers And Gates				56°35′46″N 3°19′16″W	Category C(S)	22329	Upload Photo
13, 15 And 15A Allan Street				56°35′33″N 3°20′16″W	Category C(S)	49416	Upload Photo
Emma Terrace, St Mary's Old Manse Including Ancillary Building, Boundary Walls And Gates				56°35′26″N 3°20′50″W	Category B	49423	Upload Photo
Ericht Lane, Police Station Including Boundary Walls, Gatepiers And Railings				56°35′30″N 3°20′19″W	Category C(S)	49424	Upload Photo
George Street, Wingate And Northneuk Including Boundary Walls, Railings And Gates				56°35′27″N 3°20′33″W	Category C(S)	49425	Upload Photo
1 High Street				56°35′35″N 3°20′21″W	Category C(S)	49426	Upload Photo
3 - 9 (Odd Nos) High Street				56°35′34″N 3°20′22″W	Category C(S)	49427	Upload Photo
James Street, Blairgowrie Church Of Scotland Parish Church And Church Hall With Boundary Walls, Railings And Gates				56°35′36″N 3°20′32″W	Category B	49430	Upload Photo
Keay Street, Drumsheen Including Gate, Gatepiers And Railings				56°35′32″N 3°20′48″W	Category B	49433	Upload Photo
Lower Mill Street, Riverside Granary				56°35′34″N 3°20′13″W	Category C(S)	49436	Upload Photo
Newton Terrace, Bush House Including Ancillary Building, Boundary Walls And Railings				56°35′39″N 3°20′33″W	Category C(S)	49441	Upload Photo
Rattray (New), Mount Ericht Road, Woodville Including Boundary Walls, Gatepiers And Railings				56°35′38″N 3°20′04″W	Category C(S)	49473	Upload Photo
13A Wellmeadow				56°35′31″N 3°20′13″W	Category C(S)	49485	Upload Photo
Kirk Wynd, Hill Church Including Boundary Walls, Gatepiers And Gates				56°35′43″N 3°20′25″W	Category B	22288	Upload Photo
31 - 37 (Odd Nos) High Street Former Institute And Library				56°35′32″N 3°20′25″W	Category B	22296	Upload Photo
Brown Street, Old Bank House Including Ancillary Buildings, Gatepiers, Boundary Walls And Railings				56°35′34″N 3°20′32″W	Category B	22304	Upload Photo
Rattray (New), Riverside Road, Ericht Bank Including Ancillary Buildings, Boundary Walls And Gatepiers				56°35′34″N 3°20′05″W	Category B	22323	Upload Photo
Rattray (New), Ashgrove Road, Loon Brae Including Boundary Walls And Gatepiers				56°35′32″N 3°19′52″W	Category B	22327	Upload Photo
Rattray (Old), High Street, Rattray Church Of Scotland Parish Church				56°35′46″N 3°19′16″W	Category B	22328	Upload Photo
Rattray (New), Balmoral Road, Linnkeith House (Flats 1 To 4 Inclusive) And Linnkeith Cottage				56°35′53″N 3°20′19″W	Category B	22331	Upload Photo
Keay Street, The Shieling Including Ancillary Building And Gate				56°35′29″N 3°20′35″W	Category B	48639	Upload Photo
Coupar Angus Road, Altamount Lodge				56°35′16″N 3°20′12″W	Category C(S)	49421	Upload Photo
17 And 19 Perth Street, Irvine's Butcher And Knock Ma Har				56°35′27″N 3°20′29″W	Category C(S)	49444	Upload Photo
Rattray (New), Ashgrove Road, The Haugh Including Coach House, Garden Store, Boundary Walls And Gatepiers				56°35′18″N 3°19′44″W	Category C(S)	49447	Upload Photo
Kirkwynd, Hill Church Graveyard				56°35′42″N 3°20′23″W	Category B	22289	Upload Photo
Reform Street, St Mary's South Church (Formerly Church Of Scotland) Including Church Hall				56°35′25″N 3°20′19″W	Category B	48970	Upload Photo
14, A, B, C And D Allan Street, Royal Bank Of Scotland				56°35′32″N 3°20′18″W	Category B	49417	Upload Photo
Rattray (New), Hatton Road, Buchanan House Including Boundary Walls And Gatepier				56°35′53″N 3°20′05″W	Category C(S)	49456	Upload Photo
Rattray (New), Hatton Road, The Marfield				56°35′52″N 3°19′56″W	Category C(S)	49471	Upload Photo
Rattray (Old), New Road, Mansefield Including Ancillary Building And Boundary Walls				56°35′44″N 3°19′21″W	Category C(S)	49475	Upload Photo
Tannage Street, Warehouse				56°35′29″N 3°20′07″W	Category C(S)	49480	Upload Photo
21, 22 And 23 Wellmeadow				56°35′30″N 3°20′16″W	Category C(S)	49488	Upload Photo
Newton Street, Newton Castle				56°35′31″N 3°21′01″W	Category A	22314	Upload another image See more images
24 And 25 Wellmeadow				56°35′30″N 3°20′16″W	Category C(S)	22317	Upload Photo
Coupar Angus Road, Altamount House Hotel Including Gatepiers, Boundary Walls And Railings				56°35′09″N 3°20′11″W	Category B	22333	Upload Photo
Coupar Angus Road, Altamount House Hotel, Courtyard				56°35′10″N 3°20′11″W	Category C(S)	49419	Upload Photo
39 - 43 (Odd Nos) High Street Including Boundary Wall				56°35′32″N 3°20′25″W	Category C(S)	49429	Upload Photo
Newton Street, Adylinn Including Boundary Walls, Railings And Gate				56°35′26″N 3°20′36″W	Category C(S)	49438	Upload Photo
Perth Road, Duncraggan				56°34′58″N 3°20′44″W	Category B	49442	Upload Photo
Rattray (New), Balmoral Road, Balmoral Hotel				56°35′36″N 3°19′57″W	Category C(S)	49448	Upload Photo
Rattray (New), Balmoral Road, Mount Ericht Including Walled Garden, Courtyard With Ancillary Buildings, Boundary Walls, Gatepiers And Gates				56°35′35″N 3°19′59″W	Category C(S)	49451	Upload Photo
Rattray (New), Braes Road, Croft-Na-Coille Including Boundary Walls And Gatepiers				56°35′35″N 3°19′46″W	Category C(S)	49455	Upload Photo
Rattray (New), High Street, Elsham				56°35′38″N 3°19′52″W	Category C(S)	49472	Upload Photo
Upper Mill Street, Millbank House Including Boundary Walls				56°35′35″N 3°20′17″W	Category C(S)	49483	Upload Photo
17 Wellmeadow, Cartwheel Inn				56°35′32″N 3°20′15″W	Category C(S)	49487	Upload Photo
1 George Street Including Boundary Walls, Railings And Gate				56°35′35″N 3°20′29″W	Category C(S)	22299	Upload Photo
5 George Street				56°35′35″N 3°20′29″W	Category C(S)	22300	Upload Photo
Rattray (Old), Parkhill Road, Old Inn Including Boundary Walls				56°35′50″N 3°19′19″W	Category B	22330	Upload Photo
11 - 15 (Odd Nos) High Street Including Boundary Walls				56°35′34″N 3°20′23″W	Category C(S)	49428	Upload Photo
James Street, James Street House Including Boundary Walls And Gate				56°35′35″N 3°20′25″W	Category C(S)	49431	Upload Photo
Rattray (New), Ashgrove Road, Ericht Lodge Including Boundary Walls And Gate				56°35′32″N 3°19′54″W	Category B	49446	Upload Photo
Rattray (New), Balmoral Road, Hope Park Lodge Including Boundary Walls, Gatepier And Railings				56°35′53″N 3°20′14″W	Category C(S)	49450	Upload Photo
Rattray (New), Balmoral Road, Mount Ericht Lodge Including Boundary Walls, Gatepiers, Gates And Railings				56°35′37″N 3°19′58″W	Category C(S)	49452	Upload Photo
Rattray (New), Hatton Road, The Alders Including Boundary Walls				56°35′51″N 3°20′04″W	Category C(S)	49470	Upload Photo
13 Wellmeadow, The Ericht Ale House				56°35′31″N 3°20′12″W	Category C(S)	49484	Upload Photo
William Street, Ywca				56°35′25″N 3°20′25″W	Category C(S)	49490	Upload Photo
21 High Street And 1 - 7 (Odd Nos) Brown Street Including Railings				56°35′33″N 3°20′23″W	Category B	22294	Upload Photo
George Street, St Catharine's Episcopal Church Including Boundary Walls, Railings And Gate				56°35′34″N 3°20′28″W	Category B	22297	Upload Photo
13A And 15 James Street				56°35′36″N 3°20′28″W	Category C(S)	22298	Upload Photo
7, 9 And 11 Allan Street, Old Brewery Building				56°35′32″N 3°20′16″W	Category B	22322	Upload Photo
Rattray (New), Boat Brae, Riverside Methodist Church Including Church Hall, Boundary Walls, Railings And Gates				56°35′33″N 3°20′05″W	Category B	22324	Upload Photo
Rattray (New), Balmoral Road, Keathbank Mill				56°36′00″N 3°20′27″W	Category A	22332	Upload Photo
1, 3 And 5 Allan Street				56°35′32″N 3°20′15″W	Category C(S)	49415	Upload Photo
Coupar Angus Road, Altamount House Hotel, Walled Garden				56°35′11″N 3°20′14″W	Category C(S)	49420	Upload Photo
Lochy Terrace, Greenfield Including Boundary Walls, Railings, Gatepiers And Gates				56°35′31″N 3°20′40″W	Category C(S)	49434	Upload Photo
Lochy Terrace, The Cedars Including Ancillary Building, Boundary Walls And Railings				56°35′26″N 3°20′44″W	Category C(S)	49435	Upload Photo
Rattray (New), Balmoral Road, Hope Park Trust-Smith Bequest, Hope Park House Including Walled Garden. Boundary Walls, Gatepiers And Railings				56°35′57″N 3°20′13″W	Category B	49449	Upload Photo
Rattray (New), Balmoral Road, Parish Church Hall Including Boundary Walls With Inset Railings And Gates				56°35′39″N 3°20′02″W	Category C(S)	49453	Upload Photo
Rattray (Old), Rosebank Road, Viewlands Including Ancillary Building, Boundary Walls And Gatepiers				56°35′42″N 3°19′20″W	Category C(S)	49476	Upload Photo
Upper Allan Street, Hill Primary School Including Ancillary Buildings,				56°35′38″N 3°20′29″W	Category B	49482	Upload Photo
14 Wellmeadow				56°35′32″N 3°20′14″W	Category B	49486	Upload Photo

== Key ==
The scheme for classifying buildings in Scotland is:

- Category A: "buildings of national or international importance, either architectural or historic; or fine, little-altered examples of some particular period, style or building type."
- Category B: "buildings of regional or more than local importance; or major examples of some particular period, style or building type, which may have been altered."
- Category C: "buildings of local importance; lesser examples of any period, style, or building type, as originally constructed or moderately altered; and simple traditional buildings which group well with other listed buildings."

In March 2016 there were 47,288 listed buildings in Scotland. Of these, 8% were Category A, and 50% were Category B, with the remaining 42% being Category C.
