= Montrose Mausoleum =

Mausoleum at St. Kattan's Church in Scotland

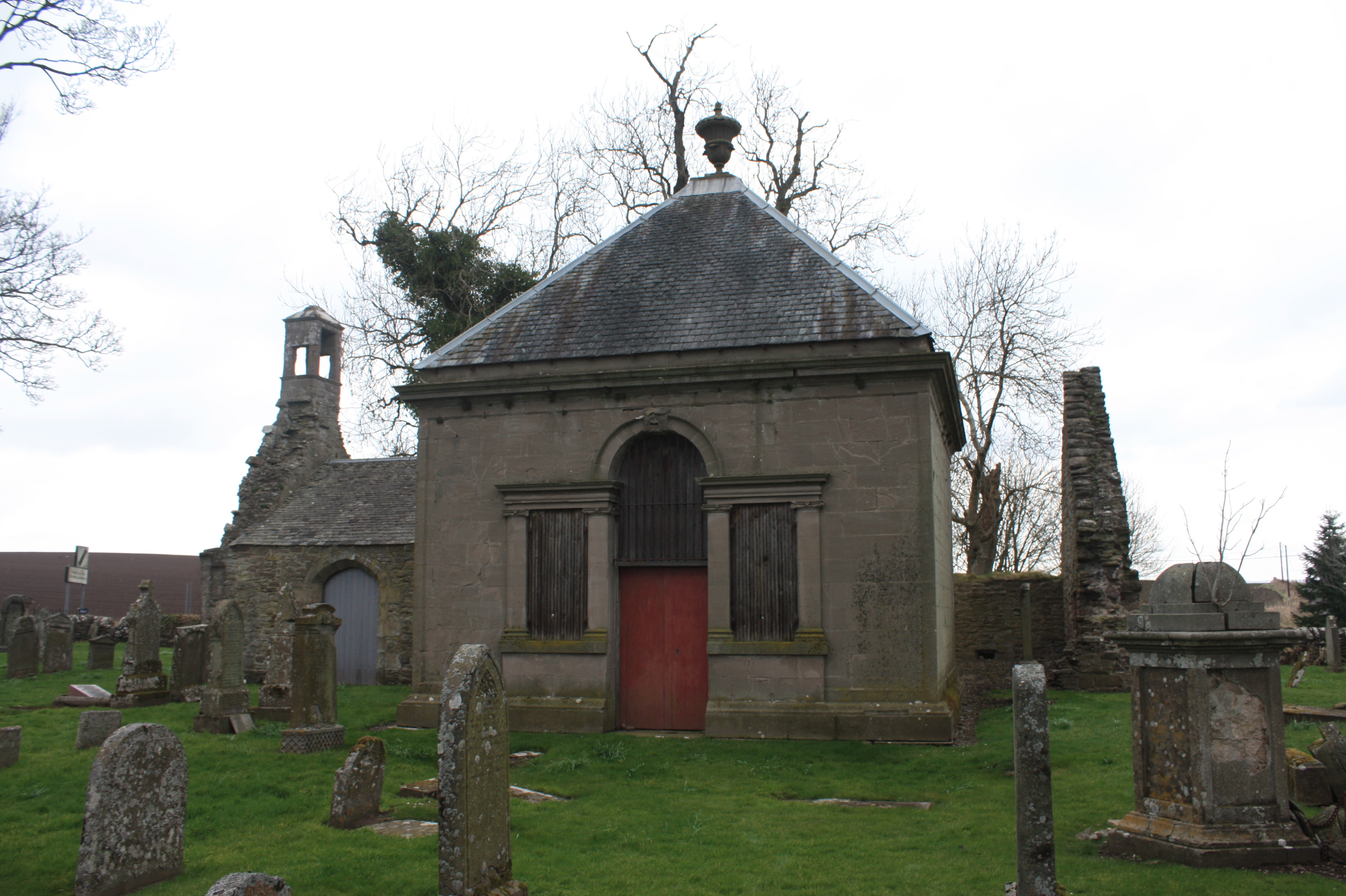
- The mausoleum in 2016
- 56°19′02″N 3°39′40″W
- Location: Aberuthven, Perth and Kinross, Scotland
- Designer: William Adam
- Completion date: 1736; 289 years ago

Montrose Mausoleum is located in the Scottish village of Aberuthven, Perth and Kinross. Dating to 1736, it is a Category A listed building. It stands in the kirkyard of St Kattan's Church.

It is believed architect William Adam allowed his 15-year-old son, John, to do some work on the structure, for his name is in an inscription in its northern wall.

Several Dukes of Montrose are interred in the structure, including James Graham (1682–1742), the last being in 1836.

== Gallery ==
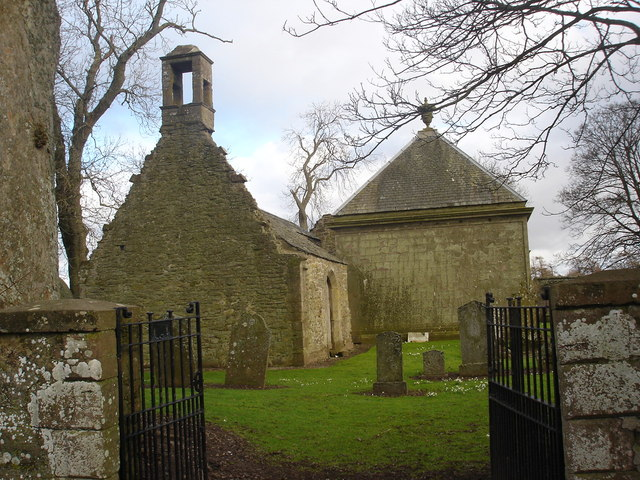
The entrance to the kirkyard, with a side view of the mausoleum

== See also ==
- List of Category A listed buildings in Perth and Kinross
