= Barnhill Tollhouse =

Tollhouse in Perth and Kinross, Scotland

- Old Toll House
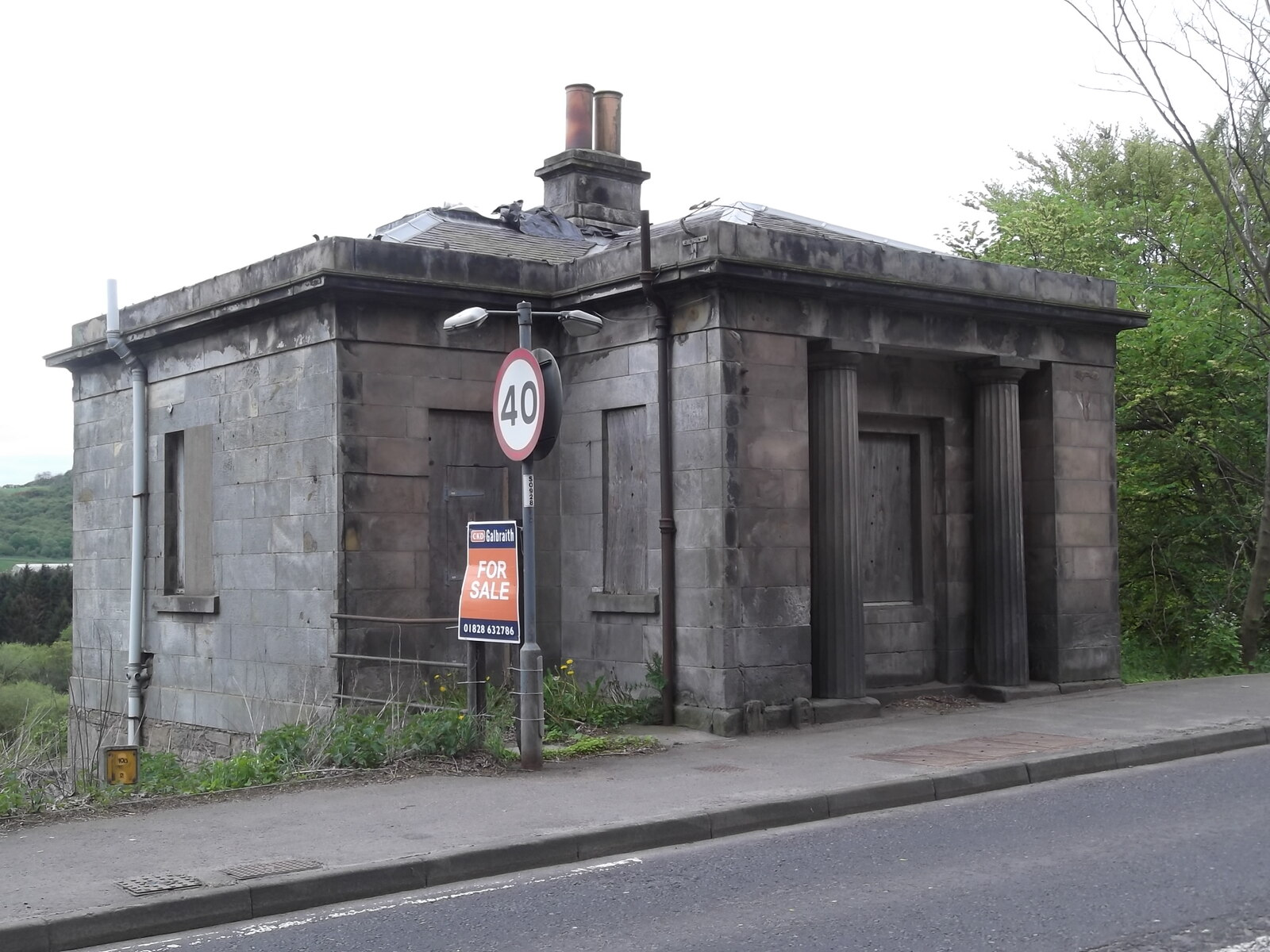
- The building in 2014

- Location within Perth and Kinross
- 56.38247°N 3.413616°W
- Location: Perth, Perth and Kinross, Scotland

History
- Built: early 19th century

Site notes
- Architect: Sir Robert Smirke

Listed Building – Category A
- Designated: 20 May 1965
- Reference no.: LB39422

Barnhill Tollhouse (also known as the Old Toll House), located just to the southeast of Perth, Scotland, was built in the early 19th century. Now a Category A listed building, it stands on Dundee Road, where it formerly collected tolls from vehicles entering the Perth city limits.

Its architect is believed to be Sir Robert Smirke, whose other designs include Perth Sheriff Court, the British Museum and Lancaster House.

It is a single-storey structure, in a T-plan with basement in the fall of the ground. Its ashlar front and centre bay projects recessed distyle Greek Doric columns. Its roof is slated and piended.

The building has been on the Buildings at Risk Register for Scotland since 2004. In 2018, plans were revealed to develop the structure into a three-storey dwelling with a rooftop garden. A plaque that showed the tolls due, which was on the right of the building's frontage, has been put into storage and will be restored to the structure upon the completion of work.

== Gallery ==
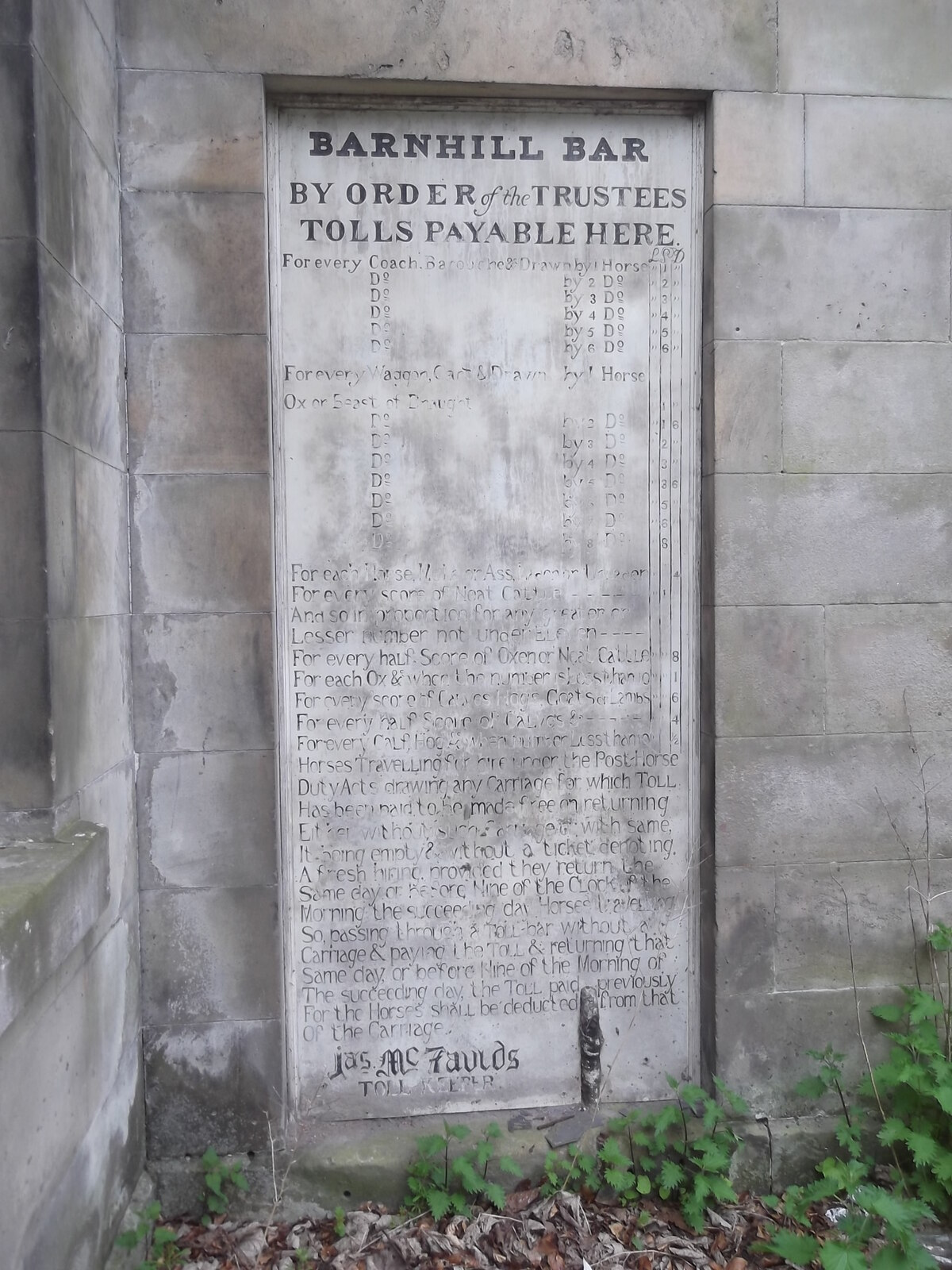
A list of tolls due on the building (since removed, to be reinstalled upon completion of renovation)

== See also ==
- List of Category A listed buildings in Perth and Kinross
- List of listed buildings in Perth, Scotland
