= Pitheavlis Castle =

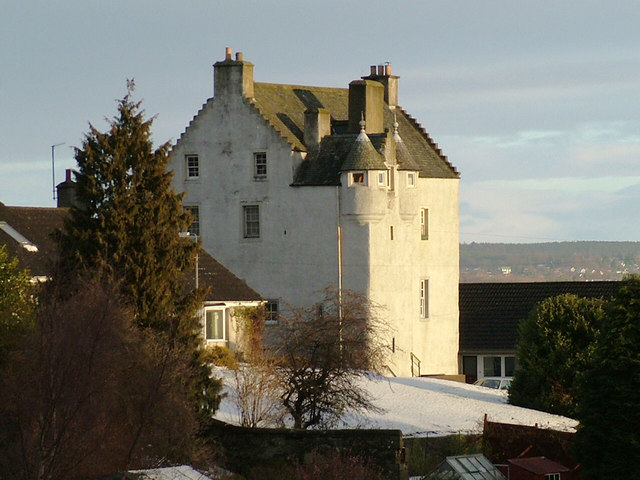

- Location of Pitheavlis Castle in Perth and Kinross
- 56.389005°N 3.450890°W
- Location: Perth, Perth and Kinross, Scotland

History
- Built: late 16th century

Listed Building – Category A
- Designated: 20 May 1965
- Reference no.: LB39346

Pitheavlis Castle, located in Perth, Scotland, was built in the late 16th century. Now a Category A listed building, it stands in a residential neighbourhood on Needless Road. No historical event is connected with the castle.

The castle was the home of the Oliphant family until the 17th century. It later became the property of the Murray family. In the early 20th century, it was bought by Montolieu Oliphant-Murray, 1st Viscount Elibank, then whisky baron Sir Robert Usher. He owned it until 1920. It is now divided into flats.

== See also ==
- List of Category A listed buildings in Perth and Kinross
- List of listed buildings in Perth, Scotland

== Bibliography ==
- Gifford, John (2007) The Buildings of Scotland: Perth and Kinross. Yale University Press, New Haven and London
- Haynes, Nick (2000) Perth & Kinross: An Illustrated Architectural Guide. The Rutland Press, Edinburgh
- MacGibbon, David and Thomas Ross (1887) The Castellated and Domestic Architecture of Scotland. David Douglas, Edinburgh
