= David Forbes Smith =

Scottish architect (1865–1923)

- Born: David Forbes Smith; Kirkcaldy
- Died: 28 October 1923; Kirkcaldy
- Occupation: Architect
- Practice: David Forbes Smith

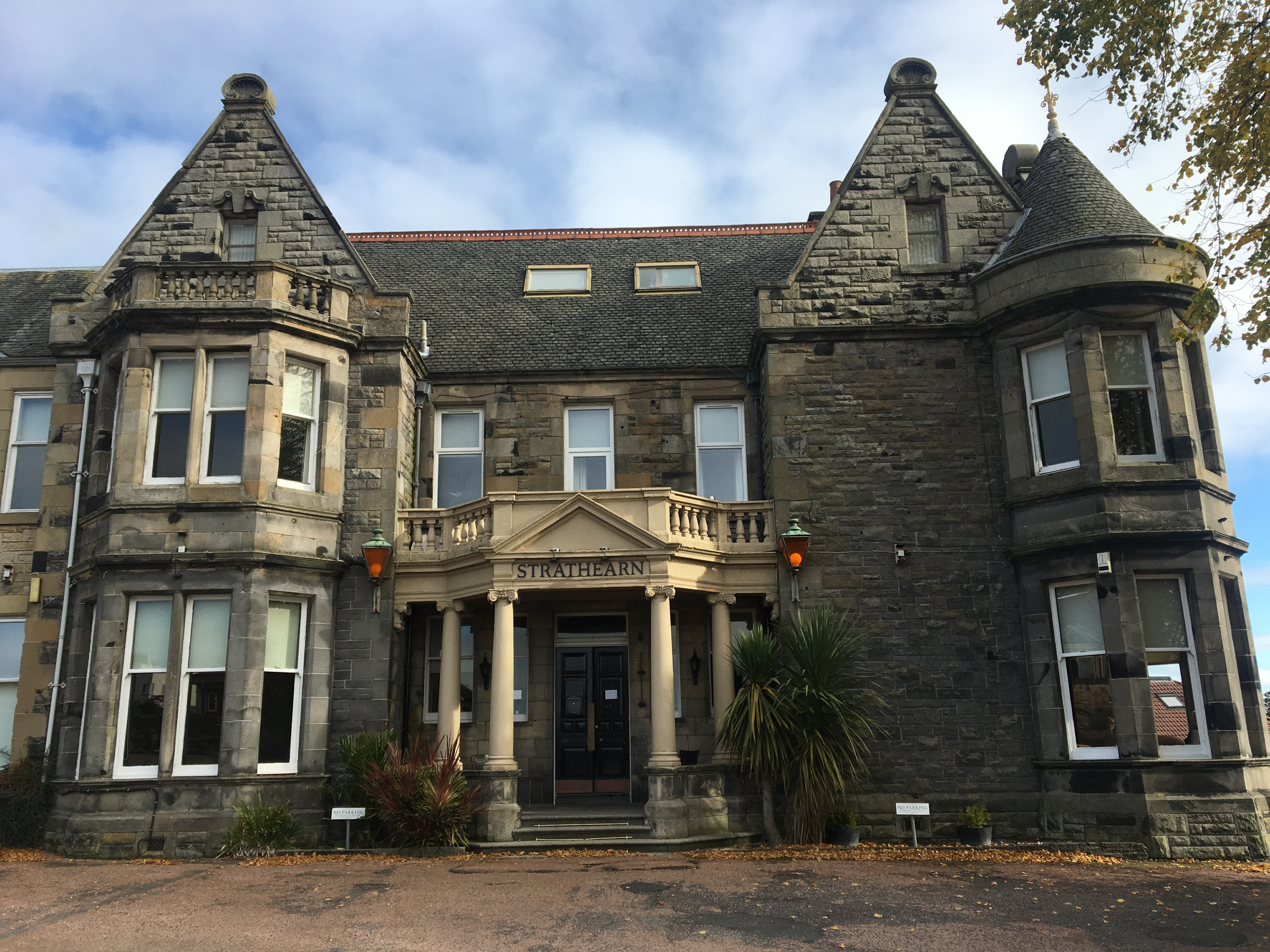
The Strathearn Hotel in Kirkcaldy, a Category B listed building built by the architect David Forbes Smith

David Forbes Smith (1865–1923) was a Scottish architect of many of the Edwardian Baroque civic and co-operative buildings in Fife during the late nineteenth and early twentieth century. Born in Kirkcaldy in 1865 he apprenticed as a carpenter before being articled to John Murray of Kirkcaldy as an architect from 1885 to 1888. He obtained a place in the newly formed partnership of Honeyman & Keppie in Glasgow, overlapping and being photographed in staff pictures with Charles Rennie Mackintosh, and was briefly in the office of Charles Davidson of Paisley before moving to Salisbury as chief assistant to the architect Fred Bath whose office he passed the qualifying exam in 1893. He was admitted as an Associate of the Royal Institute of British Architects on 12 March 1894. In 1898 he returned to his home town, spending the remainder of his career running his own practice (in partnership with Adam Legge Johnston from 1920) until his death on 28 October 1923.

He was a successful competitor in several architectural competitions, and his first listed work upon setting up his firm in Kirkcaldy was alterations to The Mechanics Institute, Dysart (now a Category B listed building). Among his principal works were Strathearn House (now the Strathearn Hotel, a Category B listed building) for the industrialist and philanthropist James Wishart, North School, Kirkcaldy; Viewforth High School, Kirkcaldy; blocks of the District Hospital and Kirkcaldy Burgh Infectious Diseases Hospital (now demolished parts of Victoria Hospital, Kirkcaldy); and Pathhead Baptist Church. His partner Adam Legge Johnston continued the practice until his death in 1955.
