= Grandtully Castle =

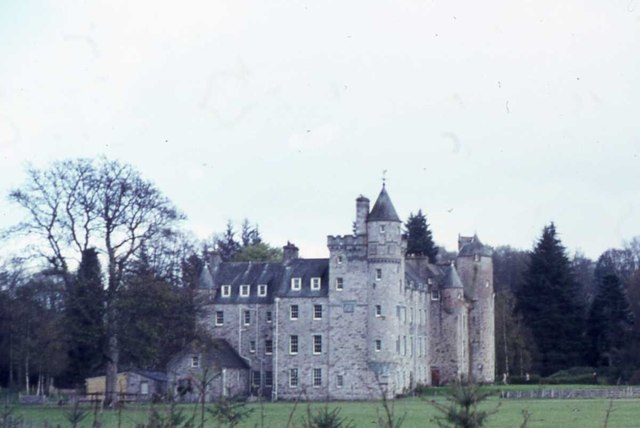
- The building in 1969

- Location in Perth and Kinross
- 56.64075°N 3.8093°W

History
- Built: 1560; 466 years ago

Listed Building – Category A
- Designated: 5 October 1971
- Reference no.: LB11830

Inventory of Gardens and Designed Landscapes in Scotland
- Official name: Grantully Castle
- Designated: 1 July 1987
- Reference no.: GDL00202

Grandtully Castle is an historic building in Grandtully, Perth and Kinross, Scotland. It is a Category A listed building dating to 1560. An earlier castle stood around 1 mile (1.5 kilometres) east and dates from 1414; only its foundations remain.

The current castle consists of a Z-plan three-storey towerhouse of 1560, extended in 1626 to create a fortified house. In the calmer world of the 19th century, extensive additions were made in the 1890s in the Scots Baronial style by Leadbetter & Fairley.

The lands and castle belonged to the Stewart family (later Drummond-Stewart baronets) from the 14th century, Thomas Stewart of Grandtully being mentioned in 1587. The castle was used by the Earl of Mar in the Jacobite Rising of 1715 and by Bonnie Prince Charlie in the 1745 rebellion.

In the early 1860s, the estate was rented by Duleep Singh, the last Maharaja of the Sikh Empire, known as the Black Prince of Perthshire. He had previously lived at nearby Castle Menzies. The property was modernised internally in the 1920s. It is now divided into flats.

The castle is said to be the basis of Tully-Veolan, the ancestral home of the Baron of Bradwardine in Sir Walter Scott's novel Waverley.

== See also ==
- List of Category A listed buildings in Perth and Kinross
