= William Macpherson (judge) =

British judge (1926–2021)

The Honourable Sir William Macpherson TD
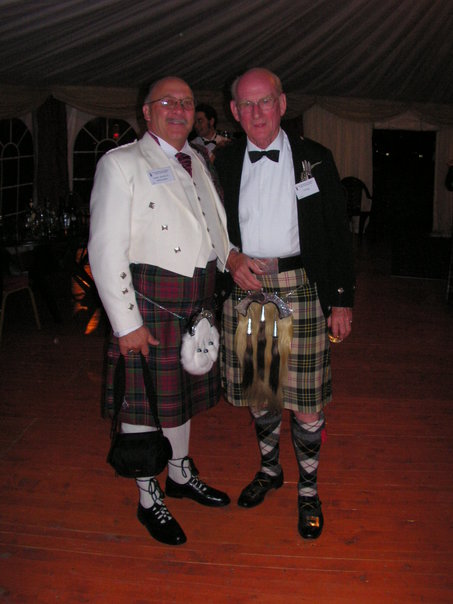
- Clan Chief Sir William Macpherson (right)

High Court Judge
- In office 24 September 1983 – 30 September 1996
- Monarch: Elizabeth II

Chief of Clan Macpherson
- In office 1969 – 14 February 2021
- Preceded by: Alan David Macpherson
- Succeeded by: James Brodie Macpherson

Personal details
- Born: William Alan Macpherson; 1 April 1926 Blairgowrie, Perth and Kinross
- Died: 14 February 2021 (aged 94)
- Spouse: Sheila McDonald Brodie (m. 1962; died 2003)
- Education: Wellington College
- Alma mater: Trinity College, Oxford

Military service
- Allegiance: United Kingdom
- Branch/service: British Army
- Rank: Lieutenant Colonel
- Unit: Scots Guards; Special Air Service

Sir William Alan Macpherson of Cluny, 6th of Blairgowrie (1 April 1926 – 14 February 2021) was a judge of the High Court of England and Wales, and the 27th Hereditary Chief of Clan Macpherson. He was a common law barrister who served as the recorder of the Crown Court, a judge at the Queen's Bench, and the presiding judge of the Northern Circuit, before his retirement in 1996. In the late 1990s, Macpherson led the public inquiry into the murder of Stephen Lawrence. His report at the end of the enquiry in 1999 was considered groundbreaking and described as one of the most significant moments in the history of British criminal justice.

He had also served as the commanding officer and later as an honorary colonel of the 21st Special Air Service Regiment of the British Territorial Army, and had been the president of the Highland Society of London and the London Scottish Rugby Football Club.

== Early life ==
Macpherson was born in Blairgowrie, Perth and Kinross, on 1 April 1926. He was the only son of Brigadier Alan David Macpherson of Cluny Macpherson, DSO, MC, 5th of Blairgowrie, 26th Hereditary Chief of Macpherson, and Catharine Richardson Hill. Macpherson was educated at Summer Fields School, Wellington College, where he played rugby, and Trinity College, Oxford. He studied philosophy, politics and economics, before going on to study law.

From 1944 to 1947, he served as a captain in the Scots Guards, an infantry regiment of the British Army. He was a member of the 21st Special Air Service Regiment of the British Territorial Army. During his time there he was deployed in Denmark, France, and Norway. He went on to be the commanding officer of the regiment between 1962 and 1965, and served as an honorary colonel between 1983 and 1991.

== Career ==
Macpherson started his law career, when he was called to the bar in 1952 by the Inner Temple. He went on to practise as a common law barrister. He was appointed the recorder of the Crown Court in 1972 and was appointed to the Queen's Bench, as a judge in the High Court of England and Wales in 1983. He was knighted in the same year. He was the presiding judge of the Northern Circuit between 1984 and 1988. He retired in 1996.

Through his legal career, Macpherson was involved in numerous important cases, including the 1993 trial at Old Bailey acquitting three ex-detectives of lying over evidence against Patrick Armstrong, a member of the Guilford Four, and also the case that resulted in the conviction of the serial killer Robert Black in 1994. He also presided over the case which resulted in paying of damages to British journalist Kate Adie over allegations of sympathetic coverage toward Colonel Gaddafi as a part of her coverage of the 1986 United States bombing of Libya. Some of his other cases that resulted in damages payout included singer Dusty Springfield over a television sketch portraying her drunk performance, and another to British politician David Penhaligon's widow for his death in a car accident.

In 1997, Macpherson was appointed head of the inquiry into the murder of Stephen Lawrence. The inquiry was published in February 1999, and became known as the Macpherson Report. The 350-page report, in which Macpherson made over 70 recommendations, has been called "one of the most important moments in the modern history of criminal justice in Britain". Some of his recommendations included the establishment and improvement of police accountability mechanisms, including setting up the Independent Police Complaints Commission, and modifications to the law that allowed for retrial provisions when new evidence came to light. The report was considered groundbreaking, setting the agenda for the next two decades of policing. His calling out of institutional discrimination in organizations including the Metropolitan Police was considered unprecedented. The Guardian newspaper, writing about the publication of the report, called it, "one of the most significant moments in the history of UK criminal justice". Speaking in 2019, about the investigation and related institutional changes, he downplayed his role and said instead, "There's obviously more to be done, but my feeling is that great steps have been taken in the right direction."

Macpherson was appointed honorary fellow at Trinity College, Oxford, in 1991. He was a member of the Royal Company of Archers, the Queen's ceremonial guard in Scotland. He was the president of the Highland Society of London and London Scottish Rugby Football Club.

He was the 27th Chief of the Macpherson clan, a position that he inherited upon the death of his father in 1969.

== Personal life ==
Coat of arms of the Macpherson of Cluny, chief of Clan MacPherson

Macpherson was married on 27 December 1962 to Sheila McDonald Brodie, daughter of Thomas Brodie of Edinburgh, Midlothian; she died on 29 October 2003. The couple had two sons and a daughter. One of his sons predeceased him, and the other, James Brodie Macpherson of Cluny, succeeded him as the 28th chief of the Macpherson clan. Some of the past prominent members of the clan included Sir John Macpherson, member of the East India Company, who served as the Governor-General of India in 1785, and Scottish poet James Macpherson.

The Macpherson family has owned Newton Castle near Blairgowrie since 1787, and it was Macpherson's home from 1936 till his death. In his later years, he lived there with his companion Lady Hilary Burnham, who joined him after the death of her husband. He enjoyed archery, fishing, and golf. Macpherson died at his home on 14 February 2021, aged 94, of old-age related complications.
