= John Adam (architect) =

Scottish architect (1721–1792)

- Born: 5 March 1721; Kirkcaldy, Fife, Scotland
- Died: 25 June 1792 (aged 71)
- Spouse: Jean Ramsay
- Parents: William Adam (father); Mary Robertson (mother)
- Relatives: Robert Adam (brother); James Adam (brother)

John Adam (5 March 1721 – 25 June 1792) was a Scottish architect, building contractor and supervisor.

== Life ==
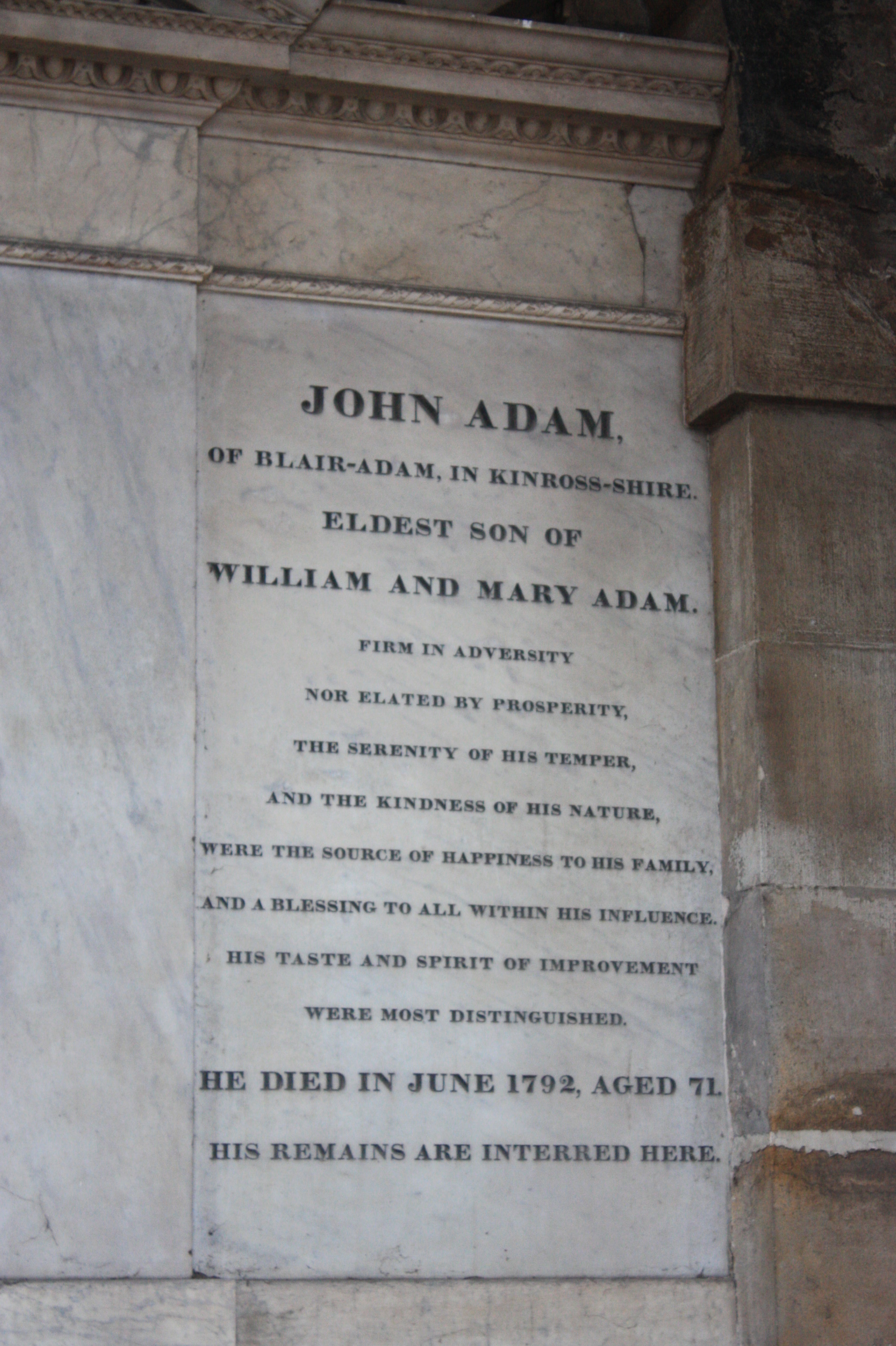
The grave of John Adam, architect, in the Adam mausoleum, Greyfriars Kirkyard, Edinburgh

Born in Linktown of Abbotshall, now part of Kirkcaldy, Fife, he was the eldest son of architect and entrepreneur William Adam and his wife Mary Robertson (1698–1761). His younger brothers Robert and James Adam also became architects.

The Adam family moved to Edinburgh in 1728, as William Adam's career as a designer of country houses began to take off. John attended Dalkeith Grammar School, outside the city, although he did not proceed to university as he was already being involved in the family businesses. However, the family home became a hub of the Scottish Enlightenment, with numerous Edinburgh virtuosi visiting.

It is believed his father allowed him to do some work on Montrose Mausoleum in Aberuthven, Perthshire, in 1736, for his name is in an inscription in the northern wall.

During the 1740s, William was gradually handing over control to his eldest son. Upon William's death in June 1748, John took over the family businesses, which besides designing and building houses, included interests in quarrying, mining and other industries. Additionally, John inherited his father's position as Master Mason to the Board of Ordnance in North Britain. John also became Laird of Blair Adam, the estate in Kinross-shire which his father had built up. At Kinross-shire, John created a large personal library.

John took his younger brother Robert into partnership, and the two profited greatly from the lucrative Board of Ordnance contracts which were had been initiated following the Jacobite rising of 1745. These included the building of Fort George near Inverness, to the designs of military engineer Colonel Skinner.

The brothers also continued to execute their late father's designs, including the pavilions and interiors of Hopetoun House. Their first major new commission came in 1754 from William Dalrymple, Earl of Dumfries. The new Dumfries House in Ayrshire was probably mostly to the design of Robert Adam, the more talented architect of the two. Robert oversaw the construction of the house until late summer 1754, when he left on his Grand Tour to Italy. Even when abroad, Robert continued to send home designs. John concentrated on the business side of the practice, although he was a competent, if formulaic, architect.

John did win a competition to design a new Royal Exchange in Edinburgh, but he was not appointed as contractor. The successful contractor then appointed another architect, who made changes to the design. However, the building, which now serves as the City Chambers, is still often attributed to John Adam.

On Robert's return to Britain, he established himself in London, where he was joined by the younger brothers James and William. John continued to look after the family's Scottish interests, investing in further quarrying ventures, and the Carron Iron Works. He supplied his London-based brothers with capital from the Blair Adam estate, at least until the collapse of a stock market venture by his friend Andrew Fairholme in 1764 left him out of pocket. Further losses occurred after the failure of Robert's speculative Adelphi development in 1772, and John was forced to mortgage Blair Adam.

John Adam designed other houses in Edinburgh and the surrounding area, including Milton House in the Old Town, Hawkhill House, near Leith Links, for Lord Alemoor and Kerse House nr. Falkirk for Sir Lawrence Dundas (all now demolished). In the Annandale town of Moffat he designed Moffat House for the Earl of Hopetoun. Among his more significant work was Adam Square, a speculative development of three houses on his own property in the city. The development, although not a true "square", represents one of the first terraces of townhouses in Edinburgh. Construction began in 1761, and despite the financial troubles, Lord President Robert Dundas was able to move in by 1768. Adam himself also lived there until 1772, as well as having a villa at Merchiston. Adam Square was demolished in the 1870s, and the site is now occupied by Adam House, a building of the University of Edinburgh.

In Edinburgh he lived at Niddry's Wynd (now known as Niddry Street.)

Upon his death in 1792, he was succeeded as laird of Blair Adam by his only surviving son, the politician and judge William Adam.

He is buried in his father's mausoleum in Greyfriars Kirkyard in Edinburgh. It is the largest monument in the graveyard and stands just south-west of the church.

== Family ==
He was married to Jean Ramsay of Abbotshall in Fife (d.1795).

== List of architectural works ==
=== Public buildings ===
- Royal Exchange, Edinburgh, with his brother Robert
- Royal Society of Arts (1772–74)
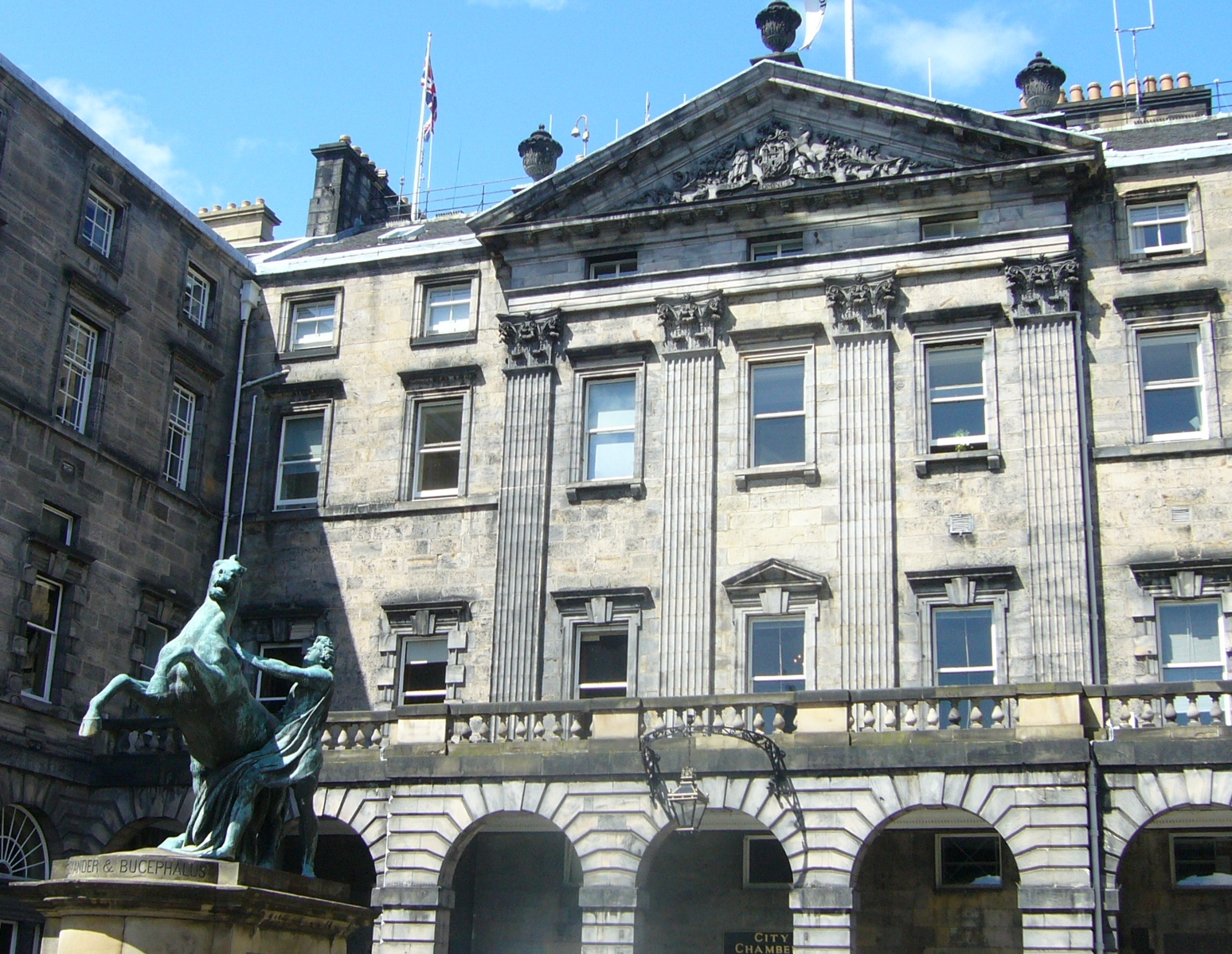
The Edinburgh City Chambers, High Street Edinburgh

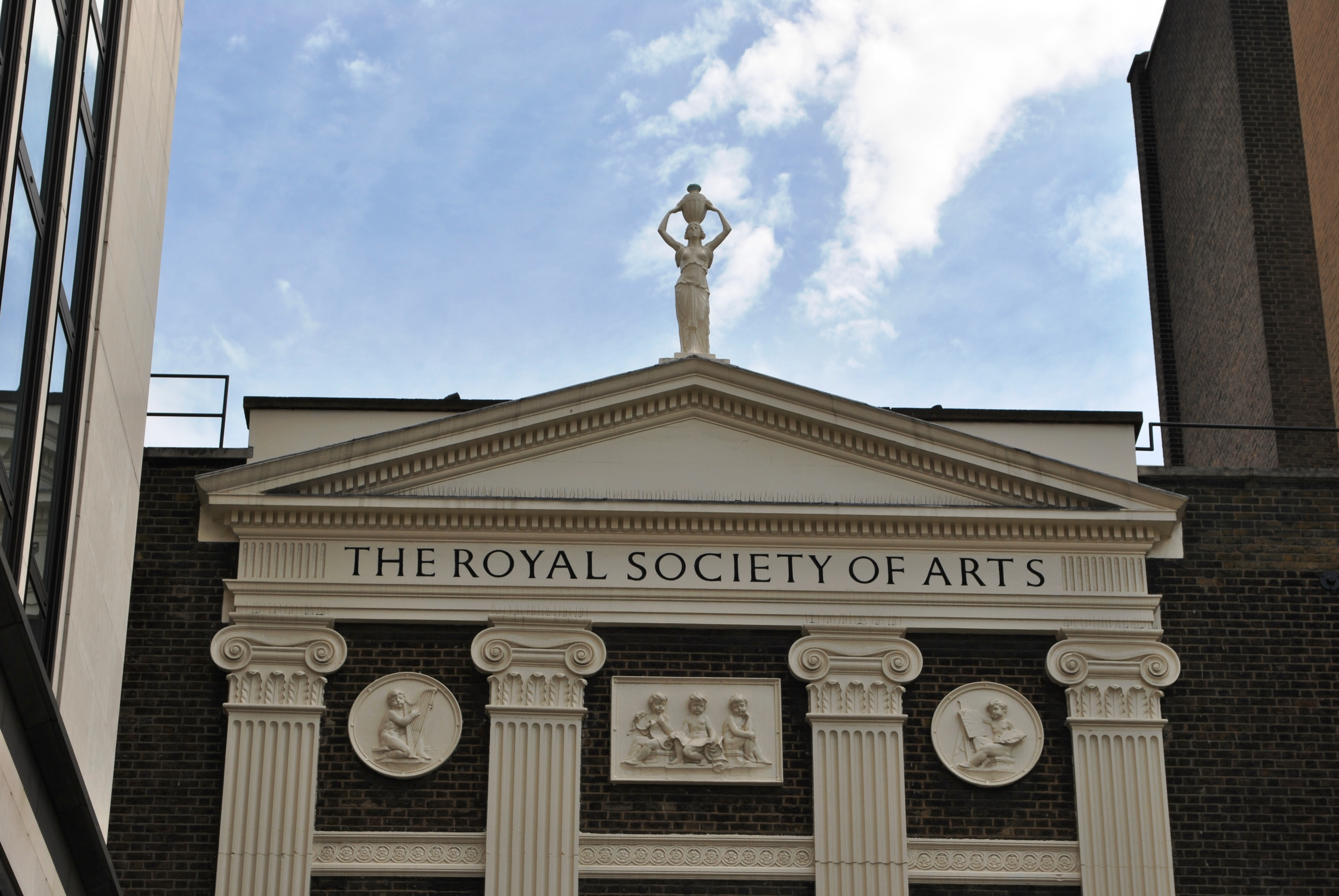
Royal Society of Arts (1772–74)

=== Garden buildings and follies ===
- Stables, Inveraray Castle, joint work with his brother Robert

=== Urban domestic work ===
- The Adelphi development, London (1768–1775) mostly demolished 1930s, a ceiling and fireplace are in the Victoria and Albert Museum
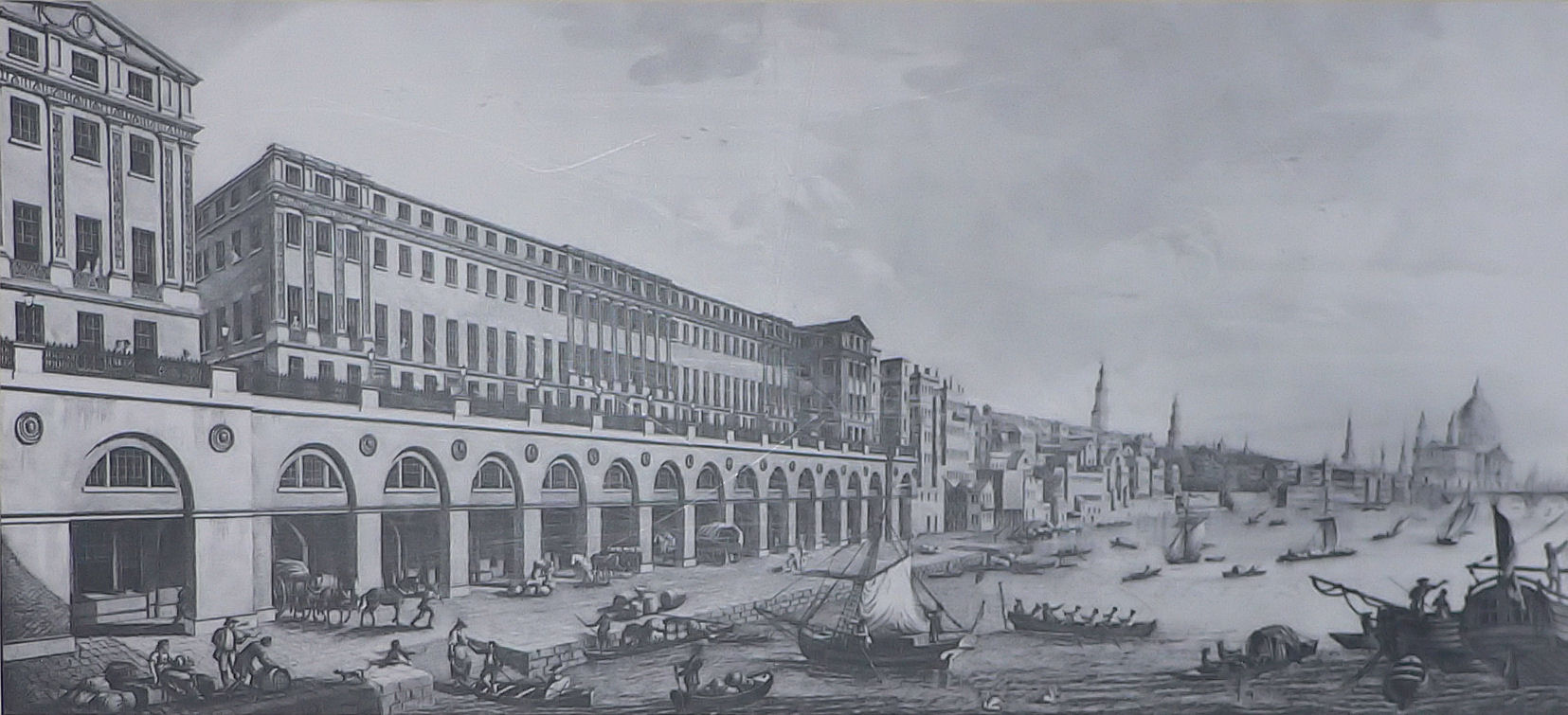
The Adam Brothers' Adelphi (1768-72)

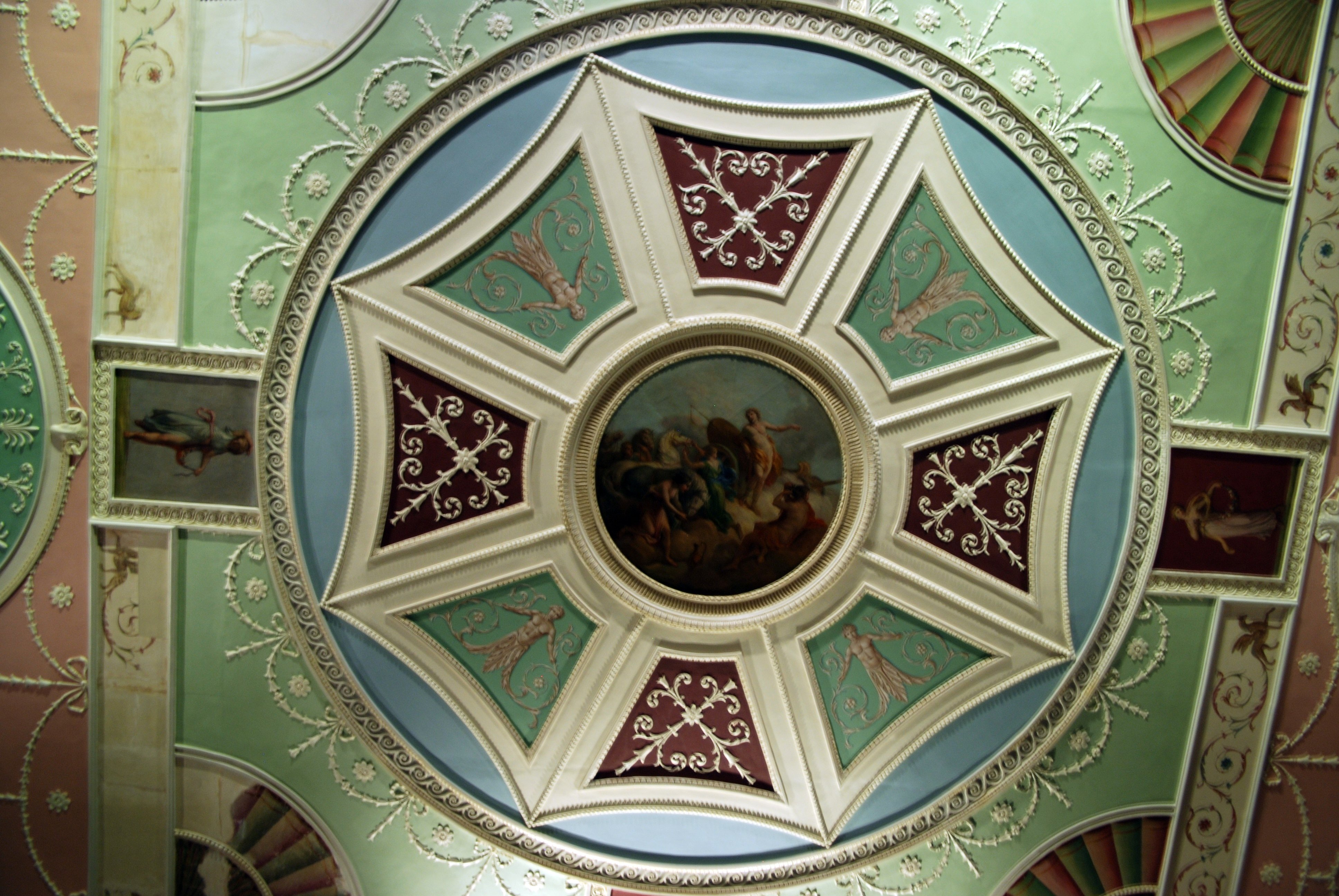
Robert Adam ceiling from the Adelphi, now in the V&A

=== Country houses with major work ===
- Dumfries House, Ayrshire (1754–1759)
- Douglas Castle, Lanarkshire (1757–1761)
- Moffat House (1762)
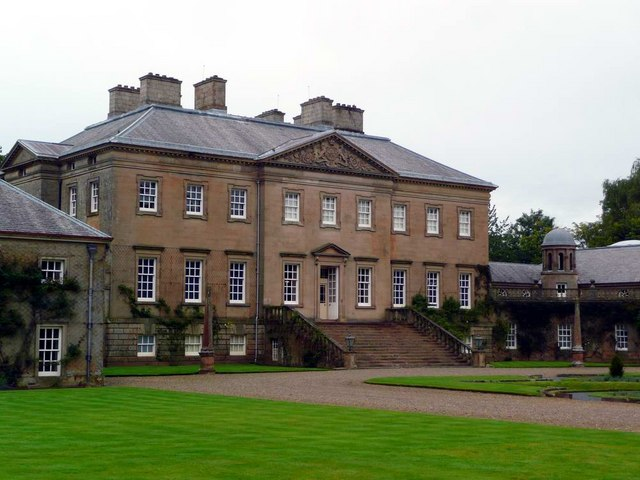
Dumfries House

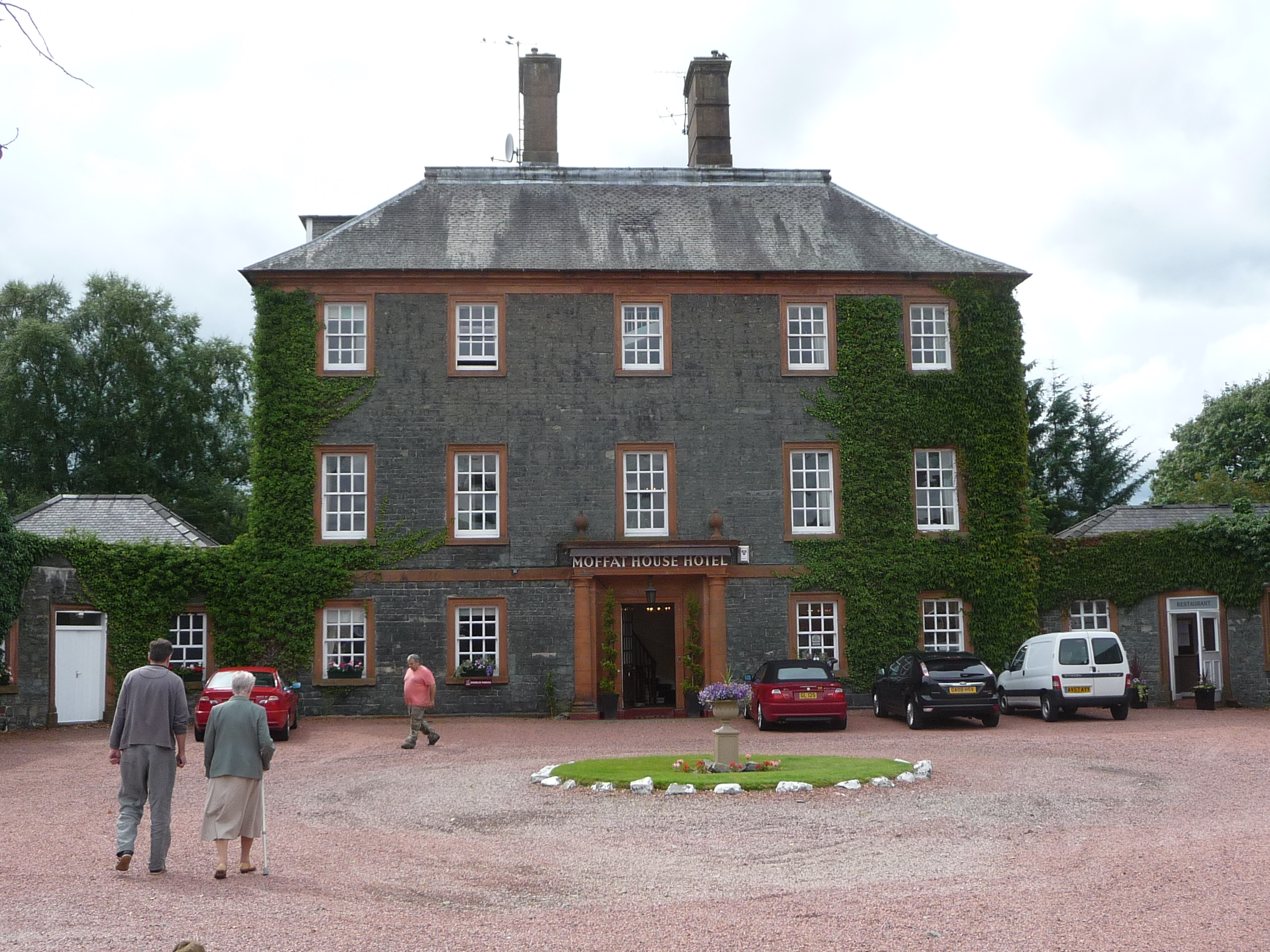
Moffat House, designed by John Adam and completed in 1762
- Gordon Castle
