= 1 Dunira Street =

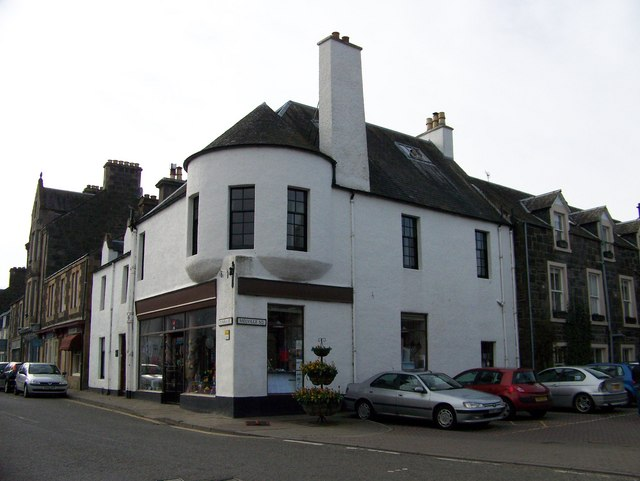
- The building in 2008

- Location in Perth and Kinross
- 56.374284°N 3.988101°W

History
- Built: 1904; 122 years ago

Listed Building – Category A
- Designated: 5 October 1971
- Reference no.: LB5393

1 Dunira Street is an historic building in Comrie, Perth and Kinross, Scotland. It is a Category A listed building dating to 1904. Its architect was Charles Rennie Mackintosh, as part of Honeyman, Keppie and Mackintosh.

A corner building, its prominent feature is its angle turret. As of 1971, its original shop fittings were still in place.

== See also ==
- List of Category A listed buildings in Perth and Kinross
