= Honeyman and Keppie =

British architectural firm

Honeyman and Keppie was a major architectural firm based in Glasgow, created by John Honeyman and John Keppie in 1888 following the death of James Sellars in whose architectural practice Keppie had worked. Their most notable employee was Charles Rennie MacKintosh, who started as a draughtsman in April 1889 and rose to partner level. The creation of the new Honeyman, Keppie and MacKintosh marked the next phase in the evolution of the practice which as Honeyman and Keppie existed from 1888 to 1904.

Whilst often viewed independently, Mackintosh did much of his most notable work while employed in the firm.

Other notable employees include James Herbert MacNair who began as an apprentice in the firm in 1894, and David Forbes Smith.

The majority of their work is in Glasgow but they received several church commissions in other towns and had connections to several small towns and villages such as Skelmorlie, Kilmacolm, and Kirkintilloch, leaving behind disproportionate representation in those towns.

== List of Works ==
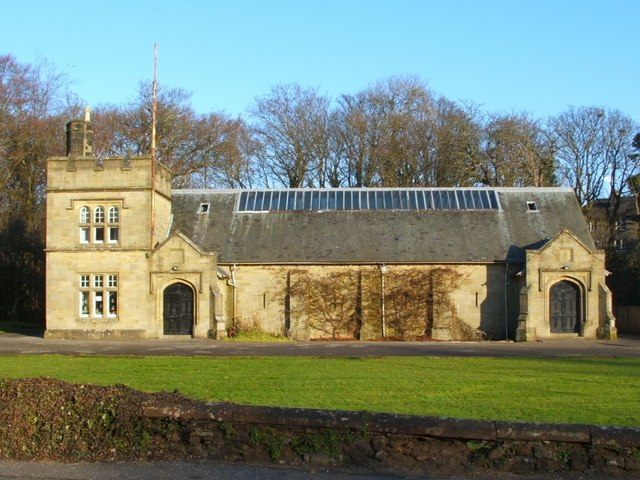
"Geilston Halls" (Cardross, Argyll) built from 1889 to 1890 by Honeyman and Keppie is used for various community functions.

- Monument to James Sellars in Lambhill Cemetery, Glasgow (1888)
- Anderson College Medical School, Dumbarton Road, Partick (1888) as a setting-up commission
- Fairfield Shipbuilding Company Offices in Govan (1889)
- Sugar Exchange in Greenock (1890)
- Monument to Sir William Pearce in Craigton Cemetery (1890)
- New offices for the Glasgow Herald newspaper on Mitchell Street in Glasgow (1893)
- Skelmorlie Parish Church (1893)
- Conservative Club in Helensburgh (1893)
- Dean Park Parish Church Govan (1893)
- Restoration of St Michaels Parish Church, Linlithgow (1893)
- Additions and internal remodelling of Cowden Castle near Muckhart (1893) (demolished)
- Medical School for Women in Kelvinside, Glasgow (1894)
- Reconstruction of Lennox Castle Inn in Lennoxtown, Stirlingshire (1895)
- New church hall at St Davids Parish Church, Kirkintilloch (1895)
- St Helens Engine Works, Glasgow (1895)
- Church Hall for West Free Church, Perth (1895)
- Glasgow Magdalene Institution and Female's House of Refuge, Lochburn, Glasgow (1896)
- New belltower on Prestwick Free Church (1896)
- Achamore House on Gigha (1896)
- Queen's Cross Church Glasgow (1896)
- Saracen Tool Works, Gallowgate, Glasgow (1896)
- Shop at 401 Sauchiehall Street Glasgow (1896)
- Glasgow School of Art with MacKintosh as project architect (1896)
- Miss Cranston's Tea Rooms ("The Willow Tearooms") on Sauchiehall Street, Glasgow (1896)
- Kilmadock Parish Manse near Doune (1897)
- 11 Margaret Street, Greenock (1897)
- Kilmacolm Manse (1897)
- Kirkintilloch Public School (1897)
- Restoration of Brechin Cathedral (1898)
- House for Dr John Calderwood (Ferndean) in Barrhead, Renfrewshire (1898)
- Cottage for Alfred A Todd at Bridge of Weir, Renfrewshire (1898)
- Dining room for Hugo Bruckmann's house in Munich, Germany (1898)
- Church hall in North Berwick (1898)
- House (Redlands) in Bridge of Weir (1898)
- Ruchill Street Free Church Mission Hall. Glasgow (1898)
- 53 Muslin Street, Glasgow (1899)
- House at Kilmacolm (Altondyke?) (1900)
- Auchenbothie House and outbuildings at Kilmacolm (lodge probably by Mackintosh) (1901)
- Workers cottages at Tulloch, Perthshire (1901)
- 1 Dunira Street, Comrie (1904)
