= Gourdie House =

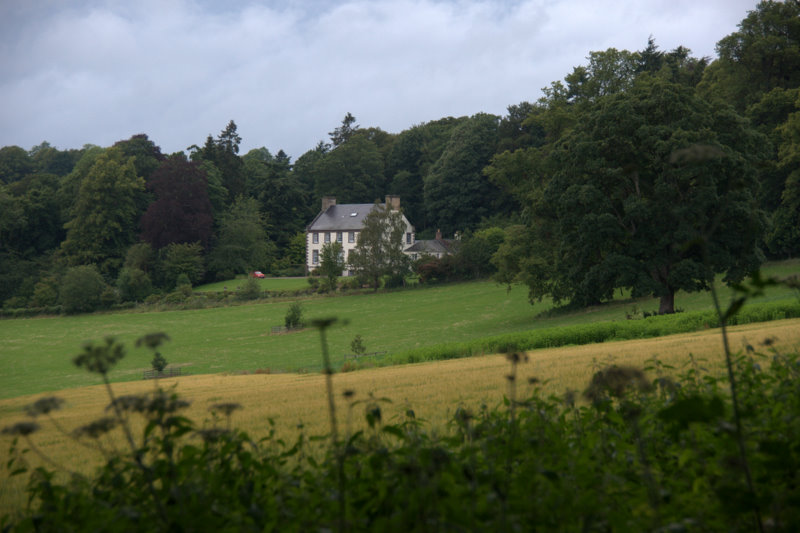
- The building in 2011

- Location in Perth and Kinross
- 56.564555°N 3.429384°W

History
- Built: 1765; 261 years ago

Listed Building – Category A
- Designated: 5 October 1971
- Reference no.: LB4440

Gourdie House is an historic building in Craigie, Perth and Kinross, Scotland. It is a Category A listed building dating to 1765.

The building is two storeys and basement, centre gabled and harled with quoins.

== See also ==
- List of Category A listed buildings in Perth and Kinross
