= Viewforth High School =

School in Kirkcaldy, Scotland

Information
- Type: Non-denominational
- Motto: In Opere Vigilando
- Established: 1908
- Headteacher: Lisa Moore
- Gender: Mixed
- Age: 11 to 18

Viewforth High School is a secondary school in East Kirkcaldy, Scotland. It opened in 1908 on Loughborough Road, but later moved to Windmill Road.

== History ==
Viewforth opened on 21 September 1908 with 176 boys and 194 girls enrolled in the school. The first head teacher was Gregor McGregor.

The first female teachers began working at Viewforth during the First World War because of the shortage of male teachers. An extension was built in 1925 and the school name was changed to Viewforth Higher Grade School. This extension was destroyed by fire in January 1938.

Viewforth built a second extension in 1955 which included a new assembly hall, classrooms and a gym. A further extension was built in the 1980s. The school name was changed again in 1980 to Viewforth High School.

In 2005, plans were drawn up for a new school building due to the obsolescence of the existing school buildings and the need to consolidate council properties. Plans were also made to build a replacement school for the rising population of South East Kirkcaldy. Forming part of Windmill Community Campus the school, which remains Viewforth High School, began construction in 2015 and brought together Viewforth High School, Rosslyn School, a local library and local office creating Fife's first community campus. It opened in 2016.

== Loughborough Road site ==
The original school building was made a C listed building in 1998. The architect was David Forbes Smith and it was a Wrenaissance building with separate entrances for boys and girls. The site incorporated Eastbank House, used as a school annex and originally built in 1870.

In 2018 both the 1908 school building and the Annex were identified as Buildings at Risk.

There was a fire on the site in 2017, for which two teenagers were charged. There was another fire in 2020, for which another teenager was charged. There had also been an earlier fire in 1977.

In 2021 a planning application for housing on the site was approved. The developers said that they will use stone from the original buildings in the boundary wall.

== Headteachers ==
Viewforth has had the following headteachers:

- Gregor MacGregor (1908-1919)
- Donald Mackay (1919-1948)
- John Rollo (1948-1968)
- Harry Henderson (1968-1981)
- Douglas Jolly (1981-1995)
- Carol McAlpine (1995-1998)
- Ian Baxter (1998-2010)
- Adrian Watt (2010-2013)
- Lynn Porter (Acting, Feb-Oct 2013)
- Adrian Watt (Oct 2013-Dec 2018)
- Calum MacFarlane (Acting, Jan 2019 - Feb 2020)
- Lisa Moore (Feb 2020–present)
