= Newton Castle =

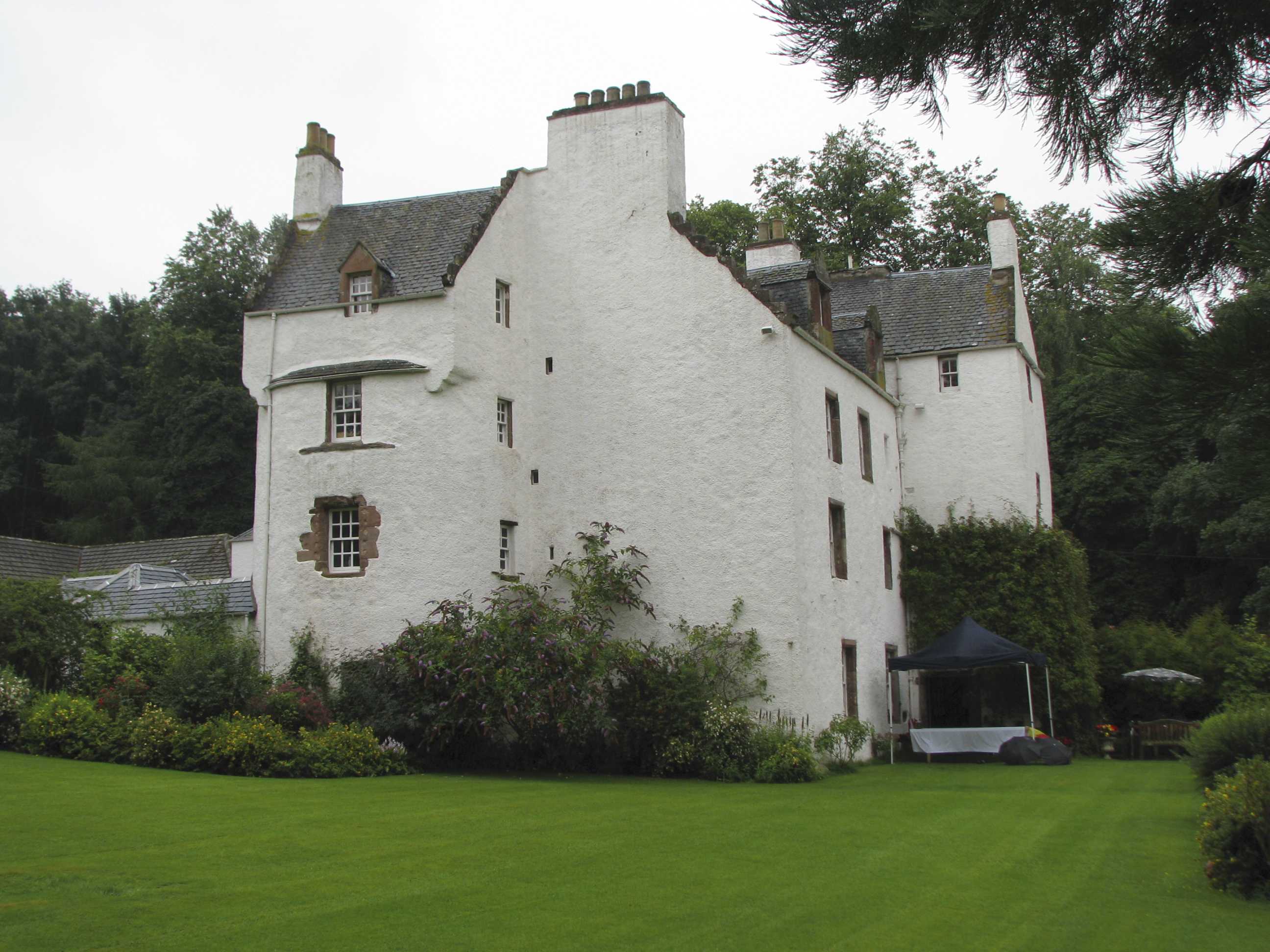
- The castle, from the southwest, pictured in 2008

- Location in Perth and Kinross
- 56.592024°N 3.350413°W

History
- Built: c. 1550; 476 years ago

Listed Building – Category A
- Designated: 5 October 1971
- Reference no.: LB22314

Newton Castle, a Category A listed building dating to the mid-16th century, stands near the town of Blairgowrie in Perth and Kinross, Scotland. It had minor alterations in the 18th century, and in 1883 a wing was added to the northwest, possibly by Lake Falconer. A subterranean vault, possibly discovered in 1911, is listed separately.

== Owners ==
The castle's documented history begins around 1550, when a George Drummond purchased the lands of "Newton of Blair". Another George Drummond, the six-times Lord Provost of Edinburgh, was born here in 1688.

The Grahams of Balgowan were the next family to live at the castle.

In 1748, Thomas Graham, one of the Duke of Wellington's generals, became Lord Lynedoch.

Colonel Alan Macpherson, 26th Hereditary Chief of Clan Macpherson, and Catharine Richardson Hill bought the estate, and it has remained in his family ever since.

In February 2021, Sir William Macpherson, the only son of the above and the then-occupant of the castle, died at the age of 94. He was succeeded by his son, Jamie, as the 28th Hereditary Chief of Clan Macpherson.

In May 2025, the castle was sold to a Scottish-American couple.

== See also ==
- List of Category A listed buildings in Perth and Kinross
