= Cottown, Aberdeenshire =

Several hamlets and villages in Scotland

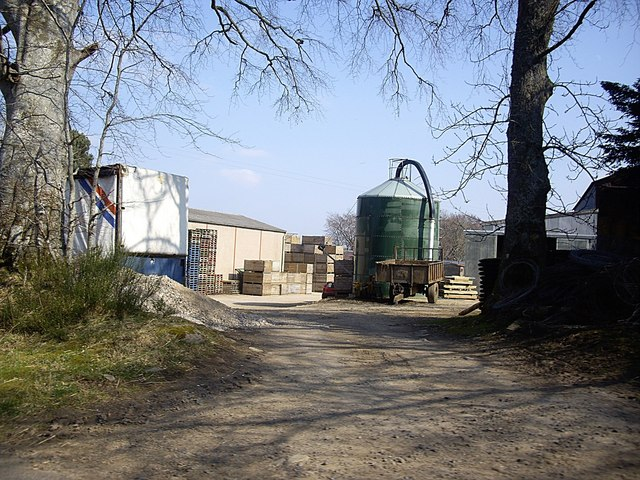

Cottown is the name of several hamlets and villages in Aberdeenshire, Scotland:

- One located at 57°19′36″N 2°49′24″W
- One located at 57°16′54″N 2°42′18″W
- One located at 57°27′18″N 2°17′30″W
- One located at 57°18′06″N 2°16′30″W
