= Perth Sheriff Court =

Building in Perth, Scotland

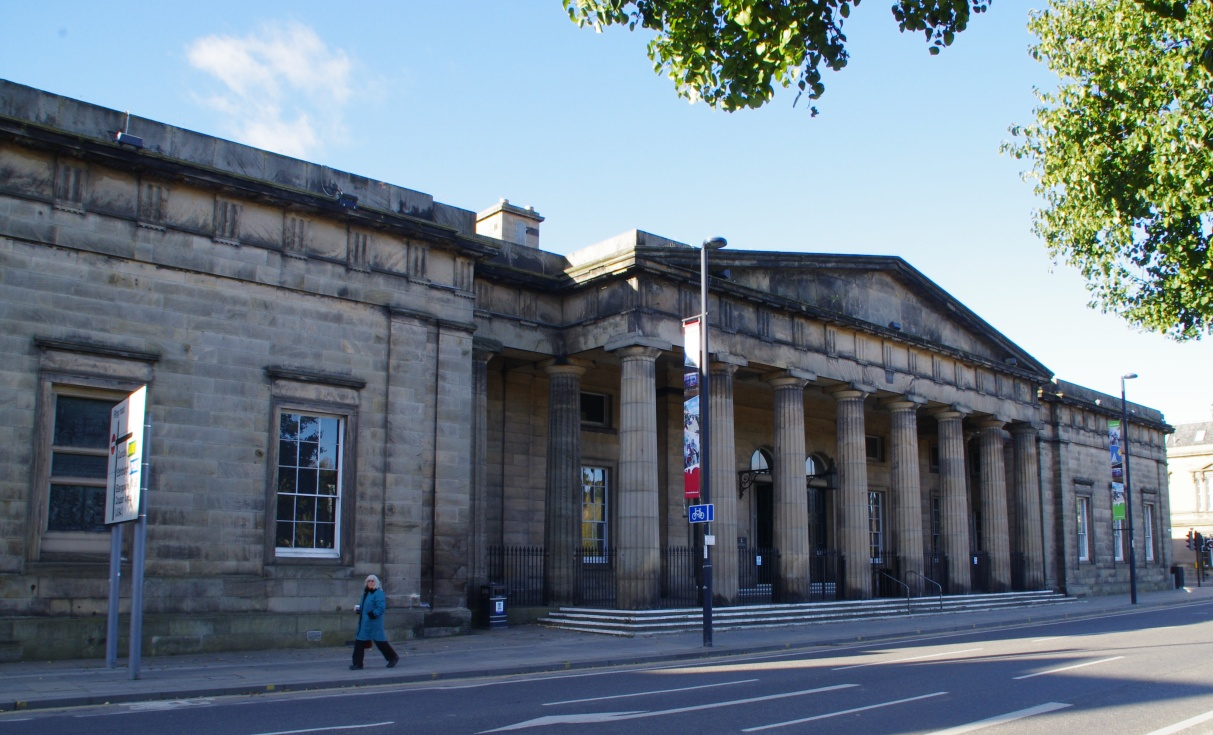
- The building in 2013
- Interactive map of the Perth Sheriff Court area

General information
- Type: Sheriff court
- Architectural style: Greek Revival style
- Location: Tay Street; Perth, Perth and Kinross, Scotland
- Coordinates: 56°23′41″N 3°25′33″W
- Completed: 1819 (207 years ago)

Design and construction
- Architect: Sir Robert Smirke

Other information
- Public transit: Perth

Website
- www.scotcourts.gov.uk/the-courts/court-locations/perth-sheriff-court-and-justice-of-the-peace-court

Listed Building – Category A
- Official name: Perth Sheriff Court and Justice of the Peace Court, Tay Street, Perth
- Designated: 20 May 1965
- Reference no.: LB39325

Perth Sheriff Court is an historic building on Tay Street in Perth, Perth and Kinross, Scotland. The structure, which is used as the main courthouse for the area, is a Category A listed building.

== History ==
Originally, court hearings in Perthshire were held in a tolbooth in the High Street which dated back at least to the 15th century. The Parliament of Scotland met in the tolbooth in 1604 and 1606, and many prisoners were incarcerated there by the Duke of Cumberland in the aftermath of the Jacobite rising of 1745. In the early 19th century it became necessary to commission a dedicated courthouse: the site the sheriff selected was occupied by Gowrie House, the location for the Gowrie Conspiracy, which surrounded an attempt on the life of King James VI in 1600. Gowrie House is acknowledged with a bronze panel by Sir John Steell on the south wall of the new building.

The new building was designed by Sir Robert Smirke in the Greek Revival style, built in ashlar stone at a cost of £32,000 and was completed in 1819. The design involved a symmetrical main frontage of thirteen bays facing Tay Street. The central section of seven bays featured an octastyle portico formed by a colonnade of ten fluted Doric order columns supporting an entablature, a frieze and a pediment. The outer sections of three bays each were fenestrated by sash windows with architraves and cornices. Internally, the principal room was the justiciary hall on the first floor at the back of the building and the Sheriff's Court and Sheriff's clerk's office in the north wing.

Following the implementation of the Local Government (Scotland) Act 1889, which established county councils in every county, the new county leaders needed to identify offices for Perthshire County Council. A council chamber was established, for this purpose, in the south wing of the building. After the implementation of the Local Government (Scotland) Act 1929, the administration of the county of Perthshire and of the neighbouring county of Kinross-shire were combined under a joint council based at the former hospital building in York Place which became known as the "County Offices". The building in Tay Street then reverted to being used solely for judicial purposes, with the south wing being re-modelled as offices for the court. The courtrooms continued to be used for hearings of the sheriff's court and for hearings of the justice of the peace court.

== Gallery ==
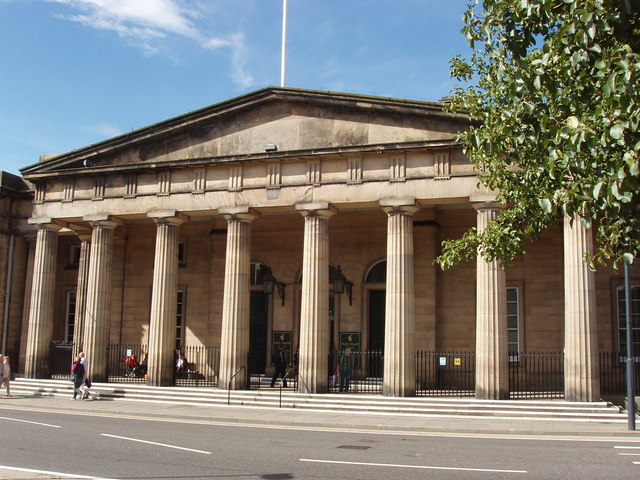
Closer view

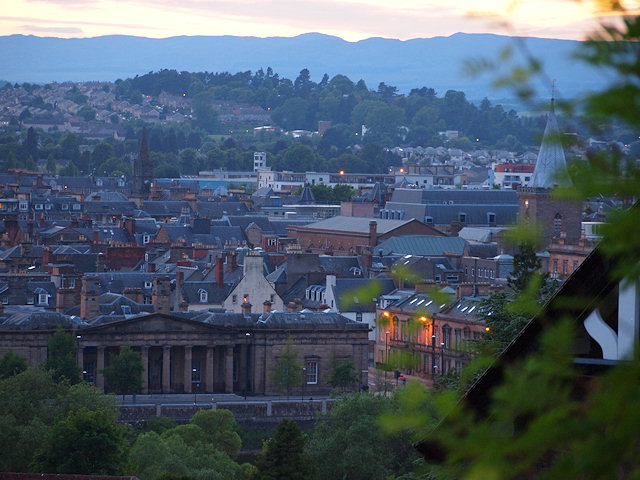
The building, with Perth behind it, viewed from Kinnoull

== See also ==
- List of Category A listed buildings in Perth and Kinross
- List of listed buildings in Perth, Scotland
