= Aldie Castle =

Scottish historic site

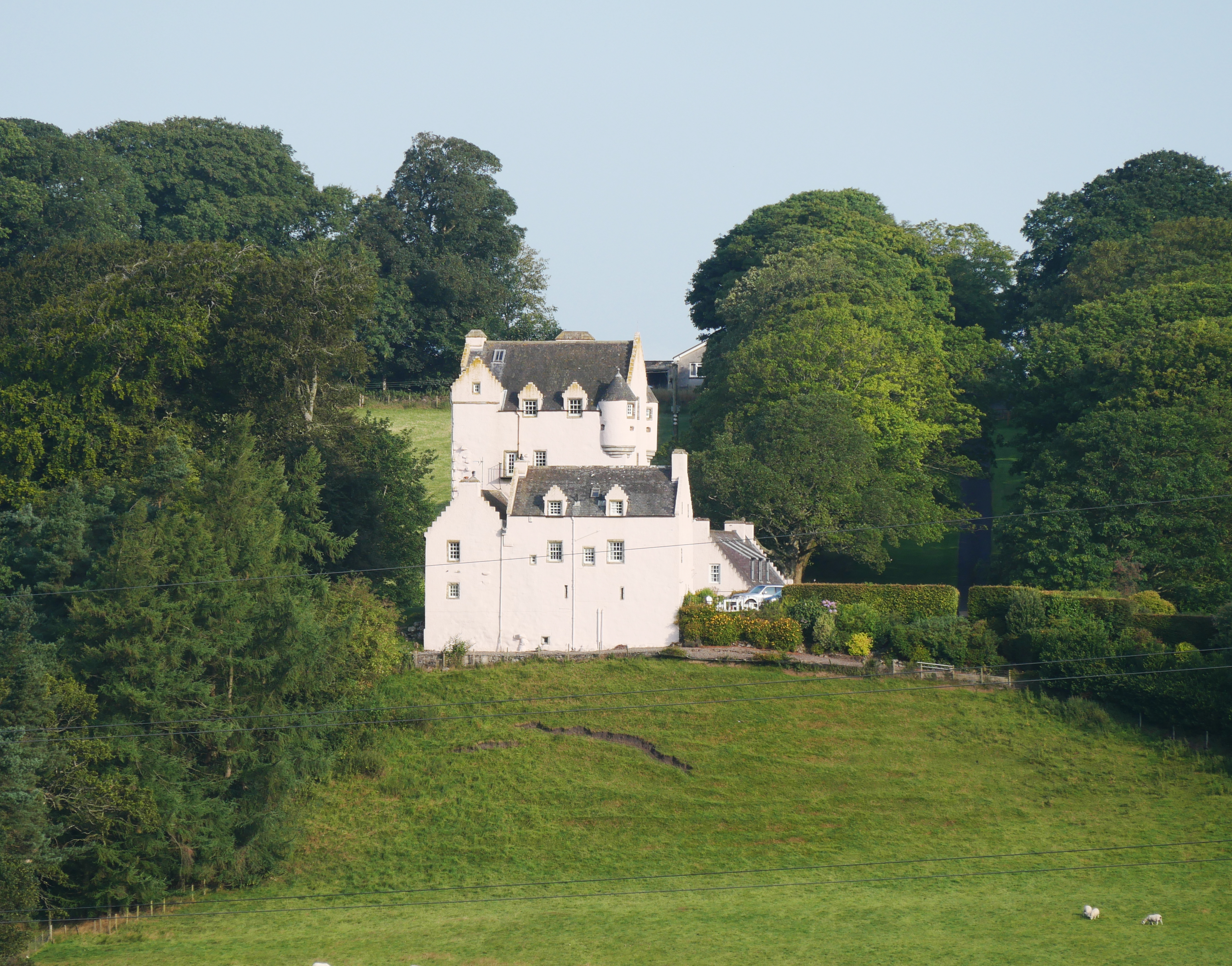
- Aldie Castle in 2025

- Location in Perth and Kinross
- 56.1638°N 3.529°W

History
- Built: early 16th century

Listed Building – Category A
- Designated: 5 October 1971
- Reference no.: LB11469

Aldie Castle is an historic building east of Crook of Devon, Perth and Kinross, Scotland. It is a Category A listed building.

== History ==
This three storey tower house dates to the early 16th century. A two-storey extension was made and a separate parallel three storey range was built and a link range between. It has a concealed vaulted basement.

The castle was the former seat of the Mercers, who acquired it from the Murrays of Tullibardine around 1350. It later passed to the Nairn family and then through marriage to the Lansdowne family. It was restored in the 1950's.

== See also ==
- List of Category A listed buildings in Perth and Kinross
- List of castles in Scotland
