= Cottown, Perth and Kinross =

Coordinates: 56.376436°N 3.283979°W

Cottown
- Location within Perth and Kinross
- OS grid reference: NO208212
- Council area: Perth and Kinross
- Lieutenancy area: Perth and Kinross
- Country: Scotland
- Sovereign state: United Kingdom
- Post town: PERTH
- Postcode district: PH2
- Dialling code: 01821
- Police: Scotland
- Fire: Scottish
- Ambulance: Scottish
- Scottish Parliament: North Tayside; North East Scotland

Cottown is a village in Perth and Kinross, Scotland, east of the village of St.Madoes and approximately 8 miles (13 kilometres) east of Perth. This area is in the Carse of Gowrie, and Cottown sits on a bank a rich alluvial soil to the north of the Firth of Tay between Perth and Dundee. It is the location of one of the largest concentrations of mudwall structures in Scotland, centred on the parish of Errol.

The Old Schoolhouse in Cottown is thought to have been constructed between 1745 and 1770, the rubble plinth possibly being the remains of an earlier sandstone building destroyed by fire in 1766. The building is likely to have reverted to a dwelling by the mid 19th century. The Schoolhouse was abandoned in 1985 and quickly fell into a state of disrepair, having been vacant ever since. In recognition of its rarity and value, as an almost intact example of 18th century mudwall construction, the building was given a category W listing in 1991. The Old Schoolhouse is now owned by the National Trust of Scotland.
