= Aberuthven =

Village in Scotland

Coordinates: 56°19′12″N 3°39′14″W

Aberuthven: Scottish Gaelic: Obar Ruadhainn
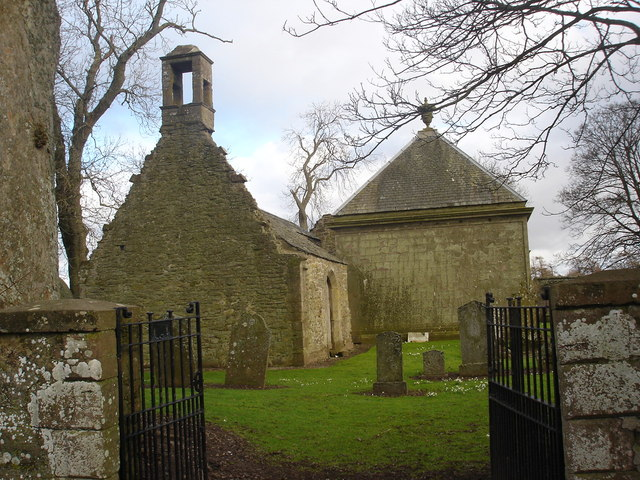
- Aberuthven church and cemetery

- Location within Perth and Kinross
- OS grid reference: NN978154
- Council area: Perth and Kinross
- Lieutenancy area: Perth and Kinross
- Country: Scotland
- Sovereign state: United Kingdom
- Post town: AUCHTERARDER
- Postcode district: PH3
- Dialling code: 01764
- Police: Scotland
- Fire: Scottish
- Ambulance: Scottish
- UK Parliament: Stirling and Strathallan
- Scottish Parliament: Perth

Aberuthven (/ˌæbəˈrɪvən/; Gaelic: Obar Ruadhainn) is a small village in Perth and Kinross, Scotland. It lies approximately 2 1/2 miles (4 kilometres) northeast of Auchterarder and 10 miles (16 kilometres) southwest of Perth at an elevation of 128 feet (39 metres). It lies on the A824 road, formerly the A9, having been bypassed along with Auchterarder since 1983. The village is centred on the village hall, with a historic church just outside the village. The population has almost doubled in recent years.

== History ==
In the 1880s the main industry in the village was cotton weaving; also it was also the site of cattle fairs, and much later, a gas works.

== Church ==
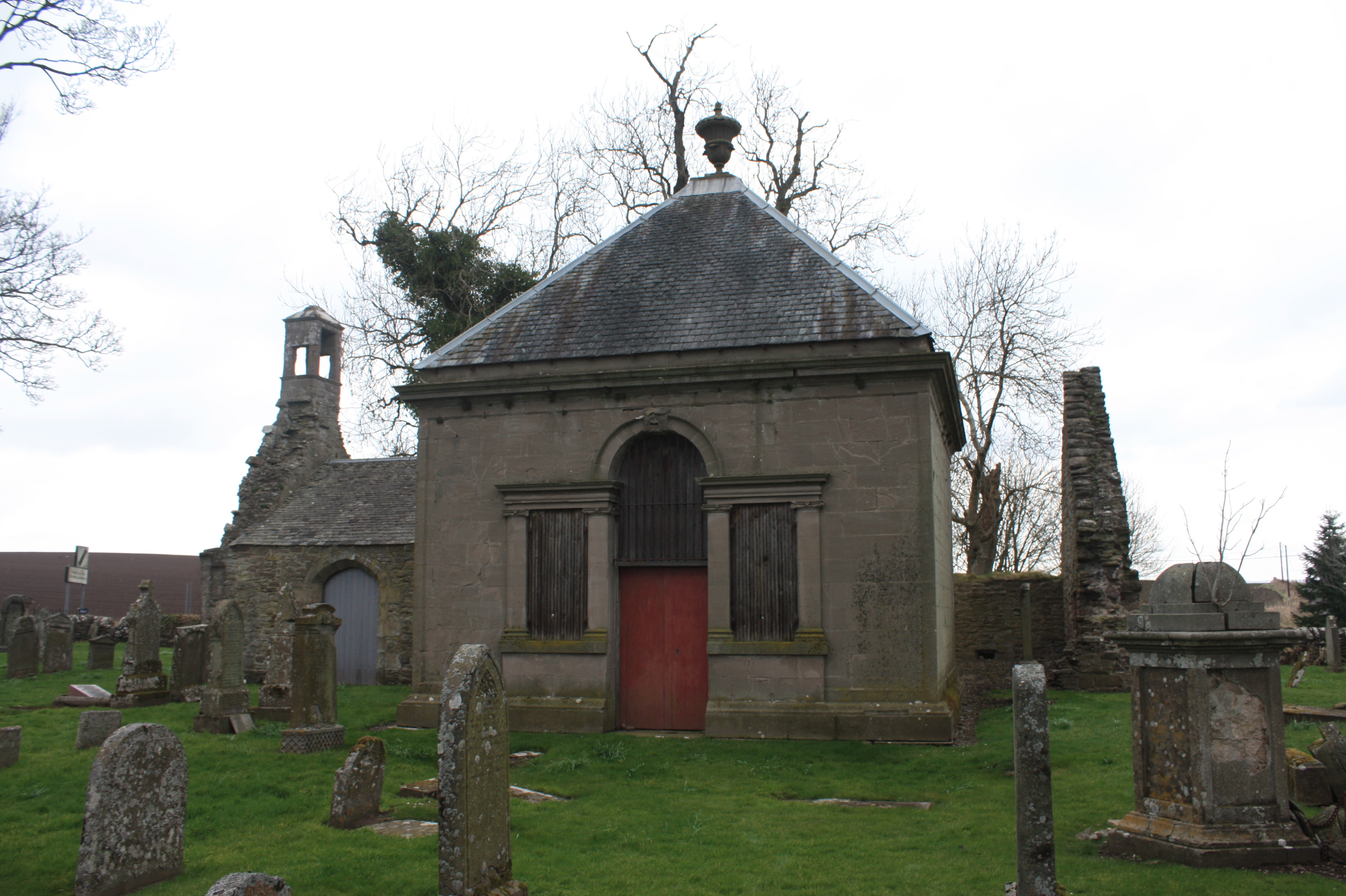
The mausoleum of James Graham, Duke of Montrose, Aberuthven

The former parish church stands in a graveyard a little beyond the west end of the village. It was dedicated to St Cattán, and is of early Christian origin, said to be one of the earliest ecclesiastical foundations in Scotland. It originally fell under the control of Inchaffray Abbey.

The now roofless church is built of sandstone rubble, and may date from the 13th century. Two lancet windows with monolithic heads in the east gable, and an aumbry (partially buried by a rise in ground level) in the north wall, are the only surviving medieval architectural features. The west gable is crowned by a bellcote added in the 1720s. The west end of the building is taken up by two burial aisles (interiors inaccessible), while the neoclassical Montrose Mausoleum (1736–38), now free-standing but originally forming a "laird's aisle", abuts it on the south side. The mausoleum contains the remains of James Graham, 1st Duke of Montrose.

The chapel was in use until 1673. There are a number of 17th and 18th-century gravestones in the churchyard.
