= List of lochs of Scotland =

This list of lochs in Scotland includes the majority of bodies of standing freshwater named as lochs but only a small selection of the generally smaller, and very numerous, lochans. This list does not currently include the reservoirs of Scotland except where these are modifications of pre-existing lochs and retain the name "loch" or "lochan".

It has been estimated that there are at least 31,460 freshwater lochs (including lochans) in Scotland, and more than 7,500 in the Western Isles alone. Whilst lochs are widespread throughout the country, they are most numerous within the Scottish Highlands and in particular in the former counties of Caithness, Sutherland and Ross and Cromarty. The majority of the larger lochs are linear in form; their distribution through the West Highlands reflects their origin in the glacial overdeepening of the straths and glens they now occupy.

Loch is a Scottish Gaelic word for a lake or fjord (cognate with the Irish Gaelic loch, which is anglicised as lough and with the older Welsh word for a lake, llwch) that has been borrowed by Scots and Scottish English to apply to such bodies of water, especially those in Scotland. Whilst "loch" or "lochan" is by far the most widespread name for bodies of standing water in Scotland, a number of other terms exist. The Lake of Menteith is the only natural body of freshwater called a "lake" in Scotland, (although it is also known as Loch Innis Mo Cholmaig in Gaelic) and there are one or two other man-made "lakes", the Lake of the Hirsel being an example. Numerous lochs are called "water", particularly in the Northern Isles, e.g. Roer Water in Shetland and Heldale Water in Orkney. These are not to be confused with similarly named rivers, particularly in the south of Scotland, e.g. Yarrow Water and Blackadder Water.

== Largest and deepest lochs ==
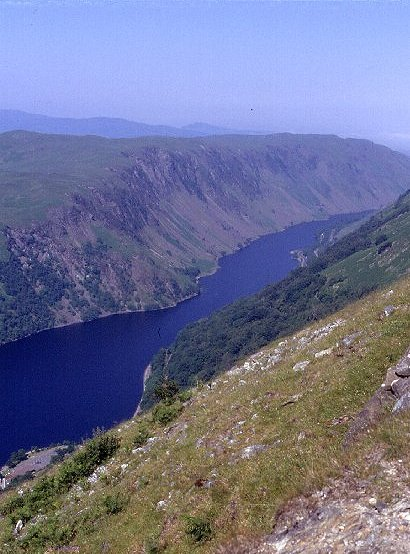
Loch Awe

This table includes the twelve largest lochs by volume, area and length as listed by Murray and Pullar (1910). The volume of water in Loch Ness is nearly double that in all the lakes of England and Wales combined. Murray and Pullar also note that the mean depth of Loch Ness is 57.4% of the maximum depth – higher than in any other large deep loch, with Loch Avich coming closest at 52.4%. Lochs Maree, Shiel and Ness are recorded as being the narrowest of the large lochs in relation to their length.

Loch	Volume		Area		Length		Max. depth		Mean depth	
Loch	(km^{3})	(mi^{3})	(km^{2})	(mi^{2})	(km)	(mi)	(m)	(ft)	(m)	(ft)
Loch Ness	7.45	1.79	56	22	36.2	22.5	227	745	132	433
Loch Lomond	2.6	0.62	71	27	36	22	190	620	37	121
Loch Morar	2.3	0.55	26.7	10.3	18.8	11.7	310	1,020	87	285
Loch Tay	1.6	0.38	26.4	10.2	23	14	150	490	60.6	199
Loch Awe	1.2	0.29	39	15	41	25	94	308	32	105
Loch Maree	1.09	0.26	28.6	11.0	20	12	114	374	38	125
Loch Ericht	1.08	0.26	18.6	7.2	23	14	156	512	57.6	189
Loch Lochy	1.07	0.26	16	6.2	16	9.9	162	531	70	230
Loch Rannoch	0.97	0.23	19	7.3	15.7	9.8	134	440	51	167
Loch Shiel	0.79	0.19	19.5	7.5	28	17	128	420	40	130
Loch Katrine	0.77	0.18	12.4	4.8	12.9	8.0	151	495	43.4	142
Loch Arkaig	0.75	0.18	16	6.2	19.3	12.0	109	358	46.5	153
Loch Shin	0.35	0.084	22.5	8.7	27.8	17.3	49	161	15.5	51

Neither the Loch of Stenness nor the Loch of Harray on Mainland Orkney is large enough to appear in the above table (Loch of Harray is 16th by area) but at higher stages of the tide they are connected to one another and to the marine waters of Hoy Sound. The former is the largest brackish lagoon in the UK and the latter, whilst predominantly freshwater, does have a transition zone in the vicinity of the Bridge of Brodgar where the two are connected. The two lochs together cover an area of 19.3 km^{2} (7.5 sq mi) but have a volume of only 0.047 km^{3} (0.011 cu mi) as they are so shallow; Loch of Stenness has a maximum depth of 5.2 metres (17 ft). Although flow between the two lochs and the sea can be observed, the water levels only change slightly with the movements of the tide.

== Mainland ==
In reaching an alphabetically arranged list, the words "loch" and "lochan" have been ignored, as have articles and prepositions in both Gaelic (a', an, an t-, na, na h-, nam, nan etc.) and English (of, the etc.). Those that have been converted to reservoirs for water supply or in association with hydroelectric projects and whose levels have been artificially raised by the construction of dams or barrages are annotated as reservoir.

=== A ===
- Loch A'an (also known as Loch Avon, Cairngorms)
- Loch of Aboyne (Aberdeenshire)
- Loch Achaidh na h-Inich (near Plockton, Lochalsh)
- Loch Achall (east of Ullapool)
- Loch Achanalt (Wester Ross)
- Loch Achilty (near Contin)
- Loch Achnacloich (north of Alness, Easter Ross)
- Loch Achnamoine (west of Kinbrace, Sutherland)
- Loch Achonachie (Strathconon) (reservoir)
- Loch Achray (Stirling)
- Achridigill Loch (southeast of Strathy, Sutherland)
- Loch Achtriochtan (Glen Coe)
- Loch an Add (Argyll and Bute) (reservoir)
- Loch Affric (Glen Affric)
- Lochan na h-Achlaise (Rannoch Moor)
- Loch Ailsh (Glen Oykel, Sutherland)
- Loch Ainme na Gaibhre (near Dornie)
- Loch na h-Airde Bige (near Poolewe, Wester Ross)
- Loch Airigh na Beinne, Assynt (southwest of Unapool, Sutherland)
- Loch Airigh na Beinne, Cape Wrath (west of Kyle of Durness, Sutherland)
- Loch Airigh an Eilein (west of Loch Ewe, Wester Ross)
- Loch Airigh Mhic Criadh (east of Gairloch, Wester Ross)
- Loch Airigh a' Phuill (east of Gairloch, Wester Ross)
- Loch na h-Airigh Sléibhe (east of Scourie, Sutherland)
- Loch Aisir Mòr (Oldshoremore, Sutherland)
- Akermoor Loch (Scottish Borders)
- Loch Akran (Flow Country, Caithness)
- Aldinna Loch (Ayrshire)
- Alemoor Loch (Scottish Borders) (reservoir)
- Loch Allt na h-Airbe (also known as Loch Yucal, northwest of Kylesku, Sutherland)
- Loch Allt Eoin Thòmais (west of Loch Ewe, Wester Ross)
- Loch an Alltan Fheàrna (Sutherland)
- Loch Alvie (Speyside)
- Loch nan Amhaichean (Easter Ross)
- Loch Anna (near Dornie)
- Antermony Loch (East Dunbartonshire)
- Approach Loch (South Ayrshire)
- Loch Arail (Argyll and Bute)
- Loch Ard (Stirling)
- Loch Ard a' Phuill (Moidart)
- Loch Ardinning (Stirling)
- Loch Arichlinie (near Kinbrace, Sutherland)
- Loch Arienas (Morvern)
- Loch Arkaig (Lochaber)
- Loch Arklet (Stirlingshire) (reservoir)
- Loch Arnicle (Kintyre)
- Loch Arthur (Dumfries and Galloway)
- Loch Ascaig (south of Kinbrace, Sutherland)
- Asgog Loch (Argyll and Bute)
- Ashgrove Loch (aka Stevenston Loch) (Ayrshire)
- Loch Ashie (northeast of Loch Ness)
- Loch Aslaich (Balmacaan Forest, west of Loch Ness)
- Loch an Aslaird (north of Ben Hee, Sutherland)
- Loch Assynt (Sutherland)
- Aucha Lochy (Kintyre)
- Auchenreoch Loch (Dumfries and Galloway)
- Auchintaple Loch (Glen Isla)
- Loch Avich (Argyll and Bute)
- Loch Avon (also known as Loch A'an) (Cairngorms)
- Loch Awe, Argyll and Bute
- Loch Awe (Inchnadamph, Sutherland)

=== B ===
- Loch Bà (Isle of Mull)
- Loch Bà (Rannoch Moor)
- Loch na Bà (east of Aultbea, Wester Ross)
- Loch Bad na h-Achlaise (northeast of Ullapool)
- Loch Bad na h-Achlaise (Coigach, Wester Ross)
- Loch Bad na h-Achlaise (near Port Henderson, Wester Ross)
- Loch Bad a' Bhàthaich (Easter Ross)
- Loch Bad a' Chreamh (west of Poolewe, Wester Ross)
- Loch Bad a' Chròtha (near Badachro, Wester Ross)
- Loch Bad a' Ghaill (Coigach, Wester Ross)
- Loch Bad na Goibhre (east of Lochinver, Sutherland)
- Loch Bad Leabhraidh (Wester Ross)
- Loch Bad na Muirichinn (south of Lochinver, Sutherland)
- Loch Bad an t Sean-tighe (Sutherland)
- Loch Bad an t-Seabhaig (Laxford Bridge, Sutherland)
- Loch Bad an Sgalaig (southeast of Gairloch, Wester Ross) (reservoir)
- Loch Bad an t-Sluic (Assynt, Sutherland)
- Loch Bad na h-Earba (northwest of Brora, Sutherland)
- Loch Badaidh na Meana (west of Strath Halladale, Sutherland)
- Loch Badanloch (west of Kinbrace, Sutherland) (contiguous with Loch nan Clàr)
- Loch Baile Mhic Chailein (Argyll and Bute)
- Loch na Bairness (Moidart)
- Ballachuan Loch (Argyll and Bute)
- Balgavies Loch (Angus)
- Ballochling Loch (Ayrshire)
- Banton Loch (North Lanarkshire)
- Bardowie Loch (East Dunbartonshire)
- Barean Loch (Dumfries and Galloway)
- Barfad Loch (Dumfries and Galloway)
- Bargatton Loch (Dumfries and Galloway)
- Barhapple Loch (Dumfries and Galloway)
- Barlockhart Loch (Dumfries and Galloway)
- Loch Barnluasgan (Argyll and Bute)
- Barnshean Loch, (Ayrshire)
- Barr Loch (Renfrewshire)
- Barscobe Loch (Dumfries and Galloway)
- Bayfield Loch (Easter Ross)
- Loch Bealach a' Bhuirich (south of Loch Glencoul, Sutherland)
- Loch Bealach Cùlaidh (Wyvis Forest)
- Loch Bealach Ghearran (Argyll and Bute)
- Loch Bealach a' Mhadaidh (southeast of Loch Glencoul, Sutherland)
- Loch Bealach na Sgeulachd (south of Loch Eriboll, Sutherland)
- Loch Beanie (Glenshee)
- Loch Beannach (north of Lairg, Sutherland) (one of three in same area)
- Loch Beannach (north of Strath Brora, Sutherland) (one of three in same area)
- Loch Beannach (north of Strath Brora, Sutherland) (one of three in same area)
- Loch Beannach, Assynt (west of Loch Assynt, Sutherland)
- Lochan Beannach Beag (Letterewe Forest, Wester Ross)
- Lochan Beannach Mór (Letterewe Forest, Wester Ross)
- Loch Beannacharan (Glen Strathfarrar, Inverness-shire)
- Loch Beannacharain or Loch Beannachan, situated close to Inverchoran
- Lochan na Bearta (Fisherfield Forest, Wester Ross)
- Loch Beinn a' Mheadhoin (Loch Benevian) (Inverness-shire) (reservoir)
- Loch Beinn Dearg (Fisherfield Forest, Wester Ross)
- Loch na Beinne Baine (north of Glen Moriston, Inverness-shire)
- Loch na Beinne Mòire (south of Cannich, Inverness-shire)
- Loch na Beinne Reidhe (Assynt, Sutherland)
- Loch Beinn Deirg (northeast of Ullapool)
- Loch na Beiste (Rubha Mor, Wester Ross)
- Loch Belivat (south of Nairn)
- Belston Loch (Ayrshire)
- Loch Ben Harrald (southwest of Altnaharra, Sutherland)
- Loch Benachally (Perth and Kinross) (reservoir)
- Bengairn Loch (Dumfries and Galloway)
- Bennan Loch (East Renfrewshire) (reservoir)
- Loch Beoraid (Lochaber)
- Bertha Loch (Perth and Kinross)
- Loch Bhac (Perth and Kinross)
- Loch Bhad Ghaineamhaich (north of Strathconon)
- Loch a' Bhadaidh Daraich (Scourie, Sutherland)
- Loch a' Bhaid Ghainmheich (south of Greenstone Point, Wester Ross)
- Loch a' Bhaid-luachraich (southeast of Aultbea, Wester Ross)
- Loch a Bhàillidh (Argyll and Bute)
- Loch a' Bhainne (northwest of Invergarry, Great Glen)
- Loch a' Bhàna (Glencannich, Inverness-shire)
- Loch a' Bhealaich (Lochalsh)
- Loch a' Bhealaich (Sutherland)
- Loch a' Bhealaich (Shieldaig Forest, Wester Ross)
- Loch a' Bhealaich Bheithe (beneath Ben Alder)
- Loch a' Bhealaich Leamhain (Badenoch)
- Loch a' Bhith (Glen Oykel, Sutherland)
- Loch a' Bhraighe (south of Drumbeg, Sutherland)
- Loch a' Bhraoin (Wester Ross)
- Loch Bhraomisaig (Knoydart)
- Loch a' Bhrisidh (Fisherfield Forest, Wester Ross)
- Loch Bhrodainn (Gaick Forest)
- Lochan na Bi (Argyll and Bute)
- Birnie Loch (nature reserve, Fife)
- Bishop Loch (near Coatbridge)
- Bishop's Loch (northeast of Dyce, Aberdeenshire)
- Black Loch West Lothian (1)
- Black Loch (grid reference NX319756) (2)
- Black Loch (East Renfrewshire)
- Black Loch (Falkirk)
- Black Loch, New Cumnock
- Black Loch, Dumfries and Galloway (Dumfries and Galloway)
- Black Loch (Dumfries and Galloway)
- Black Loch, Perth and Kinross (Grid Reference NO175427)
- Black Loch, North Ayrshire
- Black Lochs (near Connel, Argyll)
- Blackmill Loch (Argyll and Bute)
- Loch Blair (north of Loch Arkaig, Lochaber)
- Loch of Blairs (southwest of Forres)
- Blarloch Mór (southeast of Rhiconich, Sutherland)
- Loch nam Bò Uidhre (west of Strath Halladale, Sutherland)
- Loch of Boath (Nairn)
- Bogton Loch (Ayrshire)
- Loch nam Bonnach (near Muir of Ord)
- Loch Boor (east of Gairloch, Wester Ross)
- Loch Borralan (Ledmore, Sutherland)
- Loch Borralie (west of Durness, Sutherland)
- Loch Bowie (Dumbarton)
- Loch nam Brac (northeast of Scourie, Sutherland)
- Loch Brack (Dumfries and Galloway)
- Loch Bradan (Ayrshire) (reservoir)
- Braeroddach Loch (near Aboyne, Aberdeenshire)
- Loch Bràigh an Achaidh (Applecross)
- Loch Bràigh Bhruthaich (north of Carrbridge)
- Loch Bràigh Horrisdale (south of Gairloch, Wester Ross)
- Loch Brandy (Glen Clova)
- Loch nam Brathain (south of Cannich, Inverness-shire)
- Loch Breac (northwest of Dunbeath, Caithness)
- Loch nam Breac (east of Strathnaver, Sutherland)
- Loch nam Breac Buidge (near Borgie, Sutherland)
- Loch nam Breac Buidhe (Argyll and Bute)
- Loch nam Breac Dearga (west of Loch Ness)
- Lochan Breaclaich (Perth and Kinross) (reservoir)
- Loch Brecbowie (Ayrshire)
- Loch Broom (Perth and Kinross)
- Loch Brora (west of Brora, Sutherland) (three connected waterbodies)
- Brother Loch (East Renfrewshire)
- Loch Bruicheach (Boblainy Forest, Inverness-shire)
- Loch nam Buainichean (east of Gairloch, Wester Ross)
- Bruntwood Loch East Ayrshire
- Loch Buidhe (Rannoch Moor)
- Loch Buidhe (north east of Bonar Bridge)
- Loch Buidhe (east of Tongue)
- Loch Buidhe (north of Altnaharra)
- Loch Buidhe (south of Broadford, Skye)
- Loch Buidhe (Glen Muick)
- Loch Buidhe Beag (southeast of Bettyhill, Sutherland)
- Loch Buidhe Mór (southeast of Bettyhill, Sutherland)
- Loch Builg (Cairngorms)
- Loch Buine Móire (Inverpolly, Wester Ross)
- Loch Bunachton (Strathnairn)
- Loch of Bushta (Dunnet, Caithness)
- Loch of Butterstone (Perth and Kinross)

=== C ===
- Loch na Caillich (southwest of Loch Shin, Sutherland)
- Loch Caise (Flow Country, Caithness)
- Loch Caladail (west of Durness, Sutherland)
- Loch Calavie (Wester Ross)
- Caldarvan Loch (Dumbarton)
- Loch Calder (Caithness)
- Loch Call an Uidhean (Inverpolly, Wester Ross)
- Loch Callater (Braemar)
- Cally Loch (Perth and Kinross)
- Loch Caluim (Flow Country, Caithness)
- Cam Loch (Argyll and Bute) (reservoir)
- Cam Loch (Inchnadamph, Sutherland)
- Loch na Caoide (Strathconon Forest)
- Caol Loch (Flow Country, Caithness)
- Caol-loch (one of two west of Strath Halladale, Sutherland)
- Caol-loch (one of two west of Strath Halladale, Sutherland)
- Caol-loch Mór (east of Strathnaver, Sutherland)
- Loch Caoldair (north of Dalwhinnie)
- Loch na Caorach (Strath Halladale, Sutherland)
- Loch nan Caorach (southeast of Loch Glencoul, Sutherland)
- Carbeth Loch (Stirling)
- Carcluie Loch (Dalrymple)
- Carlingwark Loch (Castle Douglas, Dumfries and Galloway)
- Carlochy (Glen Esk)
- Loch Carn nam Badan (east of Strathglass)
- Loch Càrn nan Conbhairean (Benmore Forest, Sutherland)
- Loch na Carraigeach (Argyll and Bute)
- Loch Carrie (Glen Cannich, Inverness-shire)
- Carse Loch (Dumfries and Galloway)
- Carsfad Loch (Dumfries and Galloway) (reservoir)
- Cash Loch (Fife)
- Castle Loch (Dumfries and Galloway, near Lochmaben, Dumfriesshire)
- Castle Loch (Dumfries and Galloway, near Port William, Wigtownshire)
- Castle Semple Loch (Renfrewshire)
- Cauldshiels Loch (Scottish Borders)
- Loch Ceo Glais (southeast of Loch Ness, Inverness-shire)
- Loch Ceòpach (Applecross)
- Lochan a' Chairn (Easter Ross)
- Loch a' Chairn Mór (west of Loch Broom)
- Loch a' Chaol-thuil (west of Loch Ewe, Wester Ross)
- Loch Chaorainn (Argyll and Bute)
- Loch a' Chaorainn (Argyll and Bute)
- Loch a' Chaorainn (Easter Ross)
- Loch a' Chapuill (Inverpolly, Wester Ross)
- Loch a' Cherigal (Flow Country, Caithness)
- Loch Chiarain (Lochaber)
- Loch a' Chlachain (Strathnairn)
- Loch a’ Chlaidheimh (north of Loch Monar)
- Loch a' Chnuic (Abernethy Forest)
- Loch a’ Chràthaich (south of Cannich, Inverness-shire)
- Loch a' Choire (Rubha Mor, Wester Ross)
- Loch a' Choire (beneath Ben Vrackie)
- Loch a' Choire (east Sutherland)
- Loch a' Choire (Stratherrick, Inverness-shire)
- Loch a' Choire Bhuidhe (Applecross)
- Loch a' Choire Leith (near Lochcarron)
- Loch a' Choire Mhóir (east of Seana Bhraigh, Sutherland)
- Loch a' Choire Mhóir (east of Ben Wyvis, Easter Ross)
- Loch a' Choire Riabhaich (Arisaig)
- Loch Choire (Sutherland)
- Loch Chon (Stirlingshire)
- Loch a Chrion-doire (Argyll and Bute)
- Loch a' Chroisg (Strath Kanaird, Wester Ross)
- Loch a' Chroisg (Achnasheen, Wester Ross)
- Loch a' Chuilinn (Wester Ross)
- Loch Chuinneag (Easter Ross)
- Loch Ciaran (Argyll and Bute)
- Loch nan Clach (Kingairloch)
- Loch nan Clach (east of Strathnaver, Sutherland)
- Loch Clachaig (Argyll and Bute) (reservoir)
- Loch nan Clachan Geala (Rubha Mor, Wester Ross)
- Loch Clair (Coulin Forest, Wester Ross)
- Loch Clàir (near Port Henderson, Wester Ross)
- Loch na Claise Càrnaich (east of Rhiconich, Sutherland)
- Loch na Claise Móire (north of Strath Oykell, Sutherland)
- Loch nan Clàr (west of Kinbrace, Sutherland) (contiguous with Loch Badanloch)
- Loch of the Clans (Nairn)
- Clàr Loch Cnoc Thormaid (east of Scourie, Sutherland)
- Clàr Loch Mór (east of Scourie, Sutherland)
- Clar Lochan (Rhidorroch Forest, Ross-shire/Sutherland)
- Clatteringshaws Loch (Galloway) (reservoir)
- Clearburn Loch (Scottish Borders)
- Loch na Cleise Feàrna (northeast of Scourie, Sutherland)
- Loch na Cloiche (Flow Country, Caithness)
- Clonyard Loch (Dumfries and Galloway)
- Loch Cluanie (reservoir)
- Loch of Clunie (Perth and Kinross)
- Loch Cnoc na Mòinteach (south of Glen Carron)
- Cochno Loch (Clydebank)
- Loch Coille-Bharr (Argyll and Bute)
- Coire Loch (Sutherland)
- Loch Coire nan Arr (Applecross)
- Loch Coire Attadale (Applecross)
- Loch Coire an Lochain (beneath Braeriach in Cairngorms)
- Loch Coire Làir (Wester Ross)
- Loch Coire nam Mang (east of Strathnaver, Sutherland)
- Loch Coire nam Feuran (east of Loch Naver, Sutherland)
- Loch Choire Mhic Fhearchair (beneath Beinn Eighe, Wester Ross)
- Loch Coire na Saidhe Duibhe (northeast of Ben Hee, Sutherland)
- Loch Coire an Ruadh-staic (south of Maol Chean-dearg)
- Loch Coire Shùbh (near Kinlochhourn)
- Coldingham Loch (Scottish Borders)
- Loch Con (north of Loch Errochty)
- Loch Connell (Dumfries and Galloway)
- Coodham Lake (Kyle, South Ayrshire)
- Corby Loch (northeast of Dyce, Aberdeen)
- Cornish Loch (Ayrshire)
- Cotehill Loch (Aberdeenshire)
- Loch Coulin (Coulin Forest, Wester Ross)
- Loch Coulside (south of Tongue, Sutherland)
- Loch Coultrie (Kishorn)
- Loch of the Cowlatt (southeast of Forres)
- Loch Cracail Beag (southeast of Lairg, Sutherland)
- Loch Cracail Mór (southeast of Lairg, Sutherland)
- Loch Craggie (east of Lairg, Sutherland)
- Loch Craggie (Glen Oykel, Sutherland)
- Loch Craggie (southeast of Tongue, Sutherland)
- Craigallian Loch (near Milngavie)
- Craigdow Loch (Ayrshire)
- Loch na Craige (Perth and Kinross)
- Loch of Craiglush (Perth and Kinross)
- Loch Crannach (Perth and Kinross) (reservoir)
- Craufurdland Loch (East Ayrshire)
- Creagmhor Loch (Argyll and Bute)
- Loch na Creige (Applecross)
- Loch na Creige Duibhe (Lochaber)
- Loch na Creige Duibhe (Sutherland)
- Creoch Loch (Ayrshire)
- Loch na Creige Cràinde (Argyll and Bute)
- Loch Cròcach (south of Loch Eriboll, Sutherland)
- Loch Cròcach (east of Strathnaver, Sutherland)
- Loch Cròcach (south of Scourie, Sutherland)
- Loch Cròcach (north of Lochinver, Sutherland)
- Loch Croispol (Durness, Sutherland)
- Crom Loch (Sutherland/Easter Ross)
- Loch Croot (Ayrshire)
- The Cross Lochs (west of Strath Halladale, Sutherland)
- Loch Cruinn (Argyll and Bute)
- Loch Crunachdan (Glen Shirra, upper Speyside)
- Loch Cruoshie (Wester Ross)
- Loch Cuaich (east of Dalwhinnie)
- Loch nan Cuaran (Inchnadamph Forest, Sutherland)
- Loch Cùl Fraioch (south of Point of Stoer, Sutherland)
- Loch Cùl a Mhill (Sutherland)
- Loch Culag (Lochinver, Sutherland)
- Cults Loch (Dumfries and Galloway)
- Loch na Curra (Lochrosque Forest, Wester Ross)
- Loch na Curra (west of Poolewe, Wester Ross)

=== D ===
- Daill Loch (Argyll and Bute)
- Loch nan Dailthean (east of Loch Ewe, Wester Ross)
- Loch an Daimh (Perth and Kinross) (reservoir) (grid reference NN482464)
- Loch an Daimh (Wester Ross) (grid reference NH277944)
- Loch an Daimh, Strathclyde (grid reference NM860109)
- Loch an Daimh, Western Isles (grid reference NB275275)
- Loch an Daimh, Western Isles (grid reference NB399185)
- Loch an Daimh, Western Isles (grid reference NF889677)
- Loch an Daimh Ghlais, Highland (grid reference NH315521)
- Loch an Daimh Mor, Highland (grid reference NC158431)
- Loch Dallas (northeast of Aviemore)
- Loch Dallas (southeast of Forres)
- Loch Damh (south of Torridon)
- Loch Davan (northeast of Ballater, Aberdeenshire)
- Loch Dee (Galloway)
- Derclach Loch (Ayrshire)
- Loch Derculich (Perth and Kinross)
- Dernaglar Loch (Dumfries and Galloway)
- Loch an Dherue (southwest of Tongue, Sutherland)
- Loch Diabaigas Airde (west of Torridon)
- Loch Dionard (Strath Dionard, Sutherland)
- Loch Dochard (west of Bridge of Orchy)
- Loch Dochart (Perth and Kinross)
- Loch Dochfour (northeast end of Loch Ness)
- Loch Doilet (Sunart)
- Loch Doine (west of Balquidder, Stirlingshire)
- Loch Doir a' Ghearrain (Lochaber)
- Loch na Doire Duinne (south of Greenstone Point, Wester Ross)
- Loch Doire na Airbhe (Inverpolly, Wester Ross)
- Loch Doire na h-Airighe (east of Gairloch, Wester Ross)
- Loch Doire nam Mart (Morvern)
- Loch an Doire Dhuibh (Inverpolly, Wester Ross)
- Loch na Doire Moire (southeast of Plockton, Lochalsh)
- Loch Dola (east of Lairg, Sutherland)
- Loch Doon (Carrick, Scotland) (reservoir)
- Loch Dornal (Ayrshire / Dumfries and Galloway)
- Dornell Loch (Dumfries and Galloway)
- Douglaston Loch (East Dunbartonshire)
- Dowally Loch (Perth and Kinross)
- Loch an Draing (east of Rubha Reidh, Wester Ross)
- Loch an Droighinn (Argyll and Bute)
- Loch Droma (Wester Ross) (reservoir)
- Loch Druidibeag (South Uist)
- Loch Druim a' Chliabhain (east of Strathnaver, Sutherland)
- Loch Druim Suardalain (east of Lochinver, Sutherland)
- Loch Drumbeg (Assynt, Sutherland)
- Loch of Drumellie (also known as Marlee Loch) (Perth and Kinross)
- Drumore Loch (Glenshee) (reservoir)
- Drumlamford Loch (Ayrshire)
- Loch Drunkie (Stirlingshire) (reservoir)
- An Dubh-loch (Applecross)
- Loch Dubh, Loch Ard Forest (east of Ben Lomond)
- Loch Dubh (northwest of Dunbeath, Caithness)
- Loch Dubh, Ullapool (northeast of Ullapool) (continuous with Loch Ob an Lochain and Loch Dubh Beag)
- Dubh Loch (east of Gairloch, Wester Ross)
- Dubh Loch (Argyll and Bute)
- Dubh Loch (Aberdeenshire)
- Dubh Loch (Letterewe Forest, Wester Ross)
- Loch Dubh Beag (northeast of Ullapool) (continuous with Loch Dubh and Loch Ob an Lochain)
- Dubh Loch Beag (Benmore Forest, Sutherland) (larger than its neighbour Dubh Loch Mór)
- Loch Dubh a' Chuail (Sutherland)
- Dubh-loch na Creige Riabhach (east of Ben Hope, Sutherland)
- Loch an Dubh? (Knoydart)
- Lochan Dubh nan Geodh (Flow Country, Caithness)
- Dubh Loch Mór (Benmore Forest, Sutherland) (smaller than its neighbour Dubh Loch Beag)
- Lochanan Dubha (Coigach, Wester Ross)
- Duddingston Loch (Edinburgh)
- Loch Dùghaill (south of Shieldaig)
- Loch an Dùin (Atholl)
- Dumbrock Loch (near Milngavie)
- Dunalastair Water (Perthshire) (reservoir)
- Dundas Loch (Edinburgh)
- Loch Dungeon (Dumfries and Galloway) (reservoir)
- Dunsapie Loch (Edinburgh)
- Dun's Dish (east of Brechin)
- Loch Duntelchaig (Inverness-shire)
- Dunviden Lochs (east of Strathnaver, Sutherland)
- Dupplin Loch (Perth and Kinross)

=== E ===
- Loch na h-Eaglaise Beag (west of Strath Halladale, Sutherland)
- Loch Ealach Beag (Flow Country, Caithness)
- Loch Ealach Mór (Flow Country, Caithness)
- Loch nan Ealachan (Lochalsh)
- Loch nan Ealachan (Achfary, Sutherland)
- Lochan na h-Earba (Badenoch) (actually two adjoining lochs connected by a river) (eastern one is a reservoir)
- Earlstoun Loch (Dumfries and Galloway) (reservoir)
- Loch Earn (Perth and Kinross/Stirlingshire)
- Loch na h-Earrainn (Argyll and Bute)
- Loch an Easain Uaine (between Foinaven and Arkle, Sutherland)
- Loch Eck (Argyll and Bute)
- Loch Ederline (Argyll and Bute)
- Edingham Loch (Dumfries and Galloway)
- Loch an Eich Dhuibh (Strathnasheallag Forest, Wester Ross)
- Loch Eigheach (Perth and Kinross) (reservoir)
- Loch an Eilean (Rhidorroch Forest, Sutherland)
- Loch Eileanach (south of Loch Loyal, Sutherland)
- Loch Eilde Beag (Mamores)
- Loch Eilde Mòr (Mamores)
- Loch an Eileanach (northeast of Loch Shin, Sutherland)
- Loch Eileanach (Flow Country, Caithness)
- Loch an Eilein (Rothiemurchus Forest, Highland)
- Loch an Eilein (Fannich Forest, Wester Ross)
- Loch Eilt (Lochaber)
- Loch Einich (Cairngorms)
- Loch an Eion (north of Maol Chean-dearg)
- Loch an Eircill (southeast of Loch Glencoul, Sutherland)
- Loch Eireagoraidh (east of Mallaig)
- Loch Eldrig (Dumfries and Galloway)
- Loch Ellrig (Falkirk)
- Elrig Loch (Dumfries and Galloway)
- Loch Enoch (Galloway)
- Loch an Eòin (Sutherland)
- Loch Errochty (Perth and Kinross) (reservoir)
- Loch Ericht (Perth and Kinross) (reservoir)
- Erncrogo Loch (Dumfries and Galloway)
- Loch Esk (Glen Clova)
- Loch Essan (Perth and Kinross)
- Essenside Loch (Scottish Borders)
- Loch Etchachan (Cairngorms)
- Loch Ettrick (Dumfriesshire)
- Loch nan Eun (east of Rubha Reidh, Wester Ross)
- Loch nan Eun (Gleann Taitneach, Perth and Kinross, west of The Cairnwell)
- Loch nan Eun (Inverinate Forest)
- Loch nan Eun (southeast of Loch Ness)
- Loch nan Eun (Applecross)
- Loch nan Eun (west of Muir of Ord)
- Loch Eye (Easter Ross)

=== F ===
- Loch Fada (Isle of Skye)
- Lochan Fada (Letterewe Forest, Wester Ross) (one of the largest 'lochans')
- Lochan Fada (south of Canisp, Sutherland)
- Loch na Faic (west of Glen Cassley, Sutherland)
- Fairy Lochs (south east of Badachro, Wester Ross)
- Loch Fannich (Wester Ross) (reservoir)
- Fannyside Lochs (North Lanarkshire)
- Loch na Faoilinn (Argyll and Bute)
- Loch Farlary (northwest of Golspie, Sutherland)
- Loch Farr (Strathnairn, near Inverness)
- Loch Faskally (Perth and Kinross) (reservoir)
- Loch Feith an Leòthaid (Assynt, Sutherland)
- Loch na Féithe Mùgaig (east of Gairloch, Wester Ross)
- Fell Loch (Dumfries and Galloway)
- Fellcroft Loch (Dumfries and Galloway)
- Loch Fender (Perth and Kinross)
- Loch Fergus (Ayrshire)
- Loch Fern (Dumfries and Galloway)
- Loch an Fhiarlaid (Wester Ross)
- Loch a Fhraoich (Argyll and Bute)
- Loch an Fhuar Thuill Mhóir (Fannich Forest, Wester Ross)
- Loch nam Fiadh (Wester Ross)
- Loch Fiag (northeast of Loch Shin, Sutherland)
- Am Fiar-loch (Strathconon Forest)
- Fincharn Loch (Argyll and Bute)
- Fingask Loch (Perth and Kinross)
- Loch Finlas (Ayrshire) (reservoir)
- Loch Finnart (Perth and Kinross)
- Fionn Loch (Assynt, Sutherland)
- Fionn Loch (Fisherfield Forest, Wester Ross)
- Fionn Loch (Inverpolly, Wester Ross)
- Fionn Loch Beag (southeast of Loch Glencoul, Sutherland)
- Fionn Loch Mór (southeast of Loch Glencoul, Sutherland)
- Loch Fithie (Angus)
- Loch Fitty (Fife)
- Loch Fleet (Dumfries and Galloway)
- Loch Flemington (Nairn)
- Loch Fleodach Coire (Inchnadamph Forest, Sutherland)
- Loch of Forfar (Angus)
- Loch Freasdail (Argyll and Bute)
- Loch Freuchie (Perth and Kinross)
- Loch Freumhach (west of Beinn Alligin)
- Loch Frith Cheannardaidh (east Sutherland)
- Fuar Loch Beag (Fisherfield Forest, Wester Ross)
- Fuar Loch Mór (Fisherfield Forest, Wester Ross)
- Loch na Fuaralachd (Sutherland)
- Loch na Fuaralaich (southwest of Loch Shin, Sutherland)
- Loch Fuar-Bheinne (Argyll and Bute)
- Fyn Loch (Dumbarton)
- Loch of Fyntalloch (Dumfries and Galloway)
- Loch of Fyvie (Fyvie Castle grounds, Fyvie, Aberdeenshire)

=== G ===
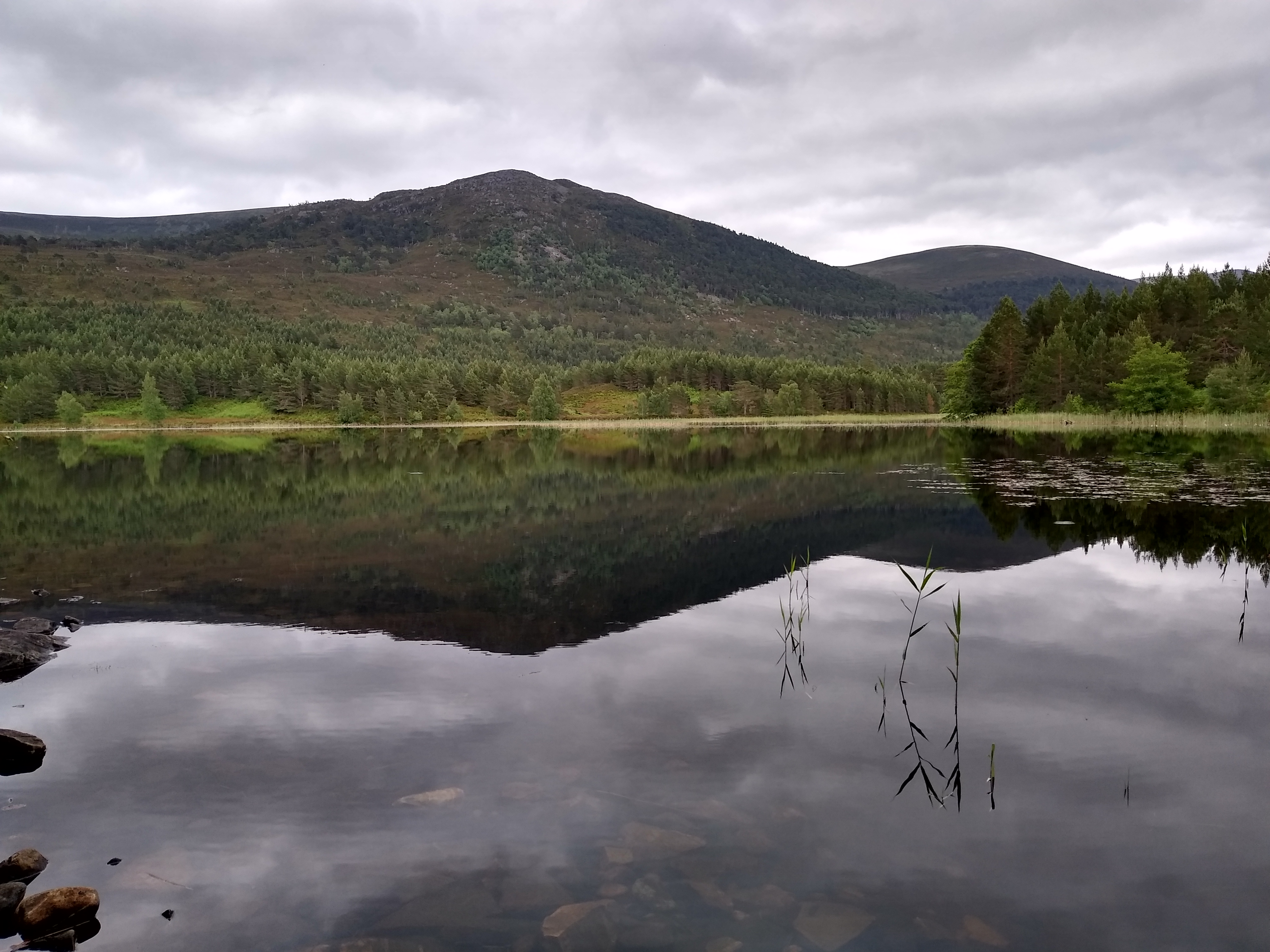
Loch Gamhna

- Loch na Gabhalach Nodha (Sutherland)
- Loch nan Gabhar (Ardgour)
- Loch nan Gad (Argyll and Bute)
- Gaddon Loch (nature reserve, Fife)
- Loch nan Gad (Argyll and Bute)
- Gadloch (Lenzie, East Dunbartonshire)
- Loch Gaineamhach (Applecross) (one of two in Applecross)
- Loch Gaineamhach (south of Ben Kilbreck, Sutherland)
- Loch Gaineamhach (Applecross) (one of two in Applecross)
- Loch Gaineamhach (Shieldaig Forest, Wester Ross)
- Loch Gaineamhach Beag (northwest of Beinn Alligin)
- Loch Gaineamhaich (Strathnasheallag Forest, Wester Ross)
- Loch Gaineanhach (Argyll and Bute)
- Loch Gaineimh (west of Kinbrace, Sutherland)
- Loch Gaineimh (Flow Country, Caithness)
- Loch na Gaineimh (north of Strath Brora, Sutherland)
- Loch na Gainimh (north of Kinlochbervie, Sutherland)
- Loch na Gainimh (north of Rhiconich, Sutherland)
- Loch na Gainimh (east of Suilven, Sutherland)
- Loch na Gainmhich (west of Kyle of Durness, Sutherland)
- Loch na Gainmhich (south of Kylesku, Sutherland)
- Gair Loch (Wester Ross)
- Loch nan Gall (west of Strath Halladale, Sutherland)
- Loch Gamhna (Rothiemurchus Forest)
- Loch a' Garbh-bhaid Mór (south of Rhiconich, Sutherland)
- Garbh Loch (Flow Country, Caithness)
- Garbh Loch Mór (north of Lochinver, Sutherland)
- Garbh Loch na h-Uidhe Doimhne (north of Lochinver, Sutherland)
- Loch Garbhaig (Flowerdale Forest, Wester Ross)
- Loch Garbhaig (Letterewe Forest, Wester Ross)
- Gare Loch (Argyll and Bute)
- Loch Garry (Inverness-shire) (reservoir)
- Loch Garry (Atholl)
- Loch Garten (Strathspey)
- Loch Garve (Easter Ross)
- Loch Gate (East Ayrshire)
- An Gead Loch (Wester Ross)
- Loch Gelly (Fife)
- Loch a' Gharbh-doire (north of Gairloch, Wester Ross)
- Loch a' Gharbhrain (Wester Ross)
- Loch a' Gheodha Ruaidh (south of Cape Wrath, Sutherland)
- Loch a' Ghille (Inverpolly, Wester Ross)
- Loch a' Ghille Ghobaich (south of Mallaig)
- Loch Ghiubhsachain (Fisherfield Forest, Wester Ross)
- Loch Ghiuragarstidh (east of Poolewe, Wester Ross)
- Loch a' Ghleannain Shalaich (south of Drumbeg, Sutherland)
- Loch a' Ghlinnein (Assynt, Sutherland)
- Loch a' Ghobha-Dhuibh (beneath Ben Hope, Sutherland)
- Loch a' Ghobhainn (Shieldaig Forest, Wester Ross)
- Loch a' Ghorm-choire (east of Ben Hee, Sutherland)
- Loch a' Ghriama (off Loch Shin, Sutherland)
- Loch Ghuilbinn (Lochaber)
- Loch nan Gillean (near Plockton, Lochalsh)
- Loch na Glaic (Sutherland)
- Loch Glascarnoch (Wester Ross) (reservoir)
- Loch Glashan (Argyll and Bute) (reservoir)
- An Glas-loch (southwest of Altnaharra, Sutherland)
- Glas-loch Mór (Sutherland)
- Loch Glass (Easter Ross) (reservoir)
- Loch Glassie (Perth and Kinross)
- Gleann Loch (Argyll and Bute) (reservoir)
- Loch Gleannan a' Choit (southeast of Drumbeg, Sutherland)
- Loch Gleannan a' Mhadaidh (south of Suilven, Sutherland)
- Glenbuck Loch (Ayrshire)
- Glentoo Loch (Dumfries and Galloway)
- Loch Glow (Fife)
- Loch a' Ghobhainn (Shieldaig Forest, Wester Ross)
- Loch a'Ghobhair (northeast of Bonar Bridge)
- Loch Goosey (Ayrshire)
- Loch Goosie (Ayrshire)
- Loch Gorm (Fannich Forest, Wester Ross)
- Gorm Loch (Ross and Cromarty)
- Gorm Loch (east of Scourie, Sutherland)
- An Gorm-loch (Strathconon Forest)
- Gorm-loch Beag (Sutherland)
- Gorm-loch Mór (Sutherland)
- Gorm Loch Mór (Letterewe Forest, Wester Ross)
- Gorm Loch Mór (northwest of Loch Assynt, Sutherland)
- Gorm Loch Mór (southeast of Loch Glencoul, Sutherland)
- Loch Gowan (south of Achnasheen)
- Loch Grannoch (Dumfries and Galloway)
- Loch Grùdaidh (Sutherland)
- Loch Gynack (near Kingussie, Speyside)

=== H ===
- Lochan Hakel (south of Tongue, Sutherland)
- Loch Hallan (outer Hebridies, Scotland)
- Hallhills Loch (Dumfries and Galloway)
- Loch Haluim (south of Tongue, Sutherland)
- Loch Harrow (Dumfries and Galloway)
- Headshaw Loch (Scottish Borders)
- Loch Heilen (Caithness)
- Hellmoor Loch (Scottish Borders)
- Loch Hempriggs (Thrumster, Caithness)
- Hen Poo (Duns Castle, Scottish Borders)
- Loch Heron (Dumfries and Galloway)
- Hightae Mill Loch (Dumfries and Galloway)
- Hogganfield Loch (near Glasgow)
- Loch Hope (Sutherland)
- Loch Horn (west of Brora, Sutherland)
- Hoselaw Loch (Scottish Borders)
- Loch Howie (Dumfries and Galloway)
- Loch Humphrey (Dumbarton) (reservoir)

=== I ===
- Loch an Iasaich (Attadale Forest, Wester Ross)
- Loch an Iasgair (northwest of Poolewe, Wester Ross)
- Loch Ille Mhòr (north of Carrbridge)
- Loch Inchard (Sutherland)
- Loch Innis na Bà Buidhe (Kinlochbervie, Sutherland)
- Loch Innis Thorcaill (west of Loch Assynt, Sutherland)
- Loch Insh (Speyside)
- Loch Inshore (west of Kyle of Durness, Sutherland)
- Loch Iol-ghaoith (Sutherland)
- Loch Iubhair (Perth and Kinross)

=== J ===
- Jordieland Loch (Dumfries and Galloway)

=== K ===
- Loch Katrine (Stirlingshire) reservoir
- Loch Keisgaig (south of Cape Wrath, Sutherland)
- Loch Kemp (southeast of Loch Ness)
- Loch Ken (Dumfries and Galloway) (reservoir)
- Loch Kennard (Perth and Kinross)
- Loch Kernsary (east of Poolewe, Wester Ross)
- Kerse Loch (Ayrshire)
- Kilbirnie Loch (North Ayrshire)
- Kilcaigrie Loch (Dumfries and Galloway)
- Kilchoan Lochs (Argyll and Bute)
- Kilconquhar Loch Fife
- Loch Killimster (Caithness)
- Loch Killin (southeast of Loch Ness, Inverness-shire)
- Killypole Loch (Kintyre)
- Loch Kinardochy (Perth and Kinross)
- Loch Kindar (Dumfries and Galloway)
- Kinghorn Loch (Fife)
- Kingside Loch (Scottish Borders)
- Loch Kinord (Aberdeenshire)
- Loch of Kinnordy (Angus)
- Kirk Loch (Dumfries and Galloway)
- Loch Kirkaldy (south of Nairn)
- Kirriemore Loch (Dumfries and Galloway)
- Kirriereoch Loch (Dumfries and Galloway)
- Loch Kishorn (Strathcarron, Lochcarron, Highland)
- Knapps Loch (Renfrewshire)
- Loch Knockie (southeast of Loch Ness)
- Knockruan Loch (Kintyre)

=== L ===
- Loch an Lagain (northeast of Bonar Bridge)
- Loch Laggan (Badenoch) (reservoir in two parts)
- Loch Laggan (Stirlingshire)
- Loch Laide (northwest of Loch Ness)
- Loch Laidon (Rannoch Moor)
- Lanark Loch (Lanark, South Lanarkshire)
- Lochan na lairige (Perth and Kinross)
- Loch nan Lann (southeast of Loch Ness)
- Loch Lànnsaidh (near Dornoch)
- Loch an Laoigh (south of Achnashellach)
- Loch Laoigh (near Dornoch)
- Loch na Lap (east of Loch Treig)
- Loch na Larach (Oldshoremore, Sutherland)
- Loch Laro (north of Bonar Bridge)
- Loch Laxford (Sutherland)
- Loch Leacann (Argyll and Bute)
- Loch Leathan (Argyll and Bute)
- Loch an Leathiad Bhuain (Glendhu Forest, Sutherland)
- Ledcrieff Loch (Perth and Kinross)
- Loch Lednock (Perth and Kinross) (reservoir)
- Loch Lee (Glen Esk)
- Loch Leir (Flow Country, Caithness)
- Loch na Leirisdein (south of Cannich, Inverness-shire)
- Loch Leitir Easaidh (west of Loch Assynt, Sutherland)
- Loch na Leitire (east of Plockton, Lochalsh)
- Loch na Leitreach (Lochalsh)
- Loch an Leòid (Argyll and Bute)
- Loch an Leothaid (southeast of Drumbeg, Sutherland)
- Loch Leven (site of Loch Leven Castle)
- Loch Lì (Fannich Forest, Wester Ross)
- Loch nan Liagh (west of Poolewe, Wester Ross)
- Loch Liath (north of Glen Moriston, Inverness-shire)
- Loch Libo (near Barrhead)
- Lilly Loch (North Lanarkshire)
- Lily Loch (northeast of Dyce, Aberdeenshire)
- Lily Loch (Dumbarton)
- Lindores Loch (Fife)
- Lindston Loch (Dalrymple)
- Linfern Loch (Ayrshire)
- Linlithgow Loch (Linlithgow, West Lothian)
- Loch Linne (Argyll and Bute)
- Loch of Lintrathen (Angus)
- Little Loch Skiach (Perth and Kinross)
- Loch Loch (Atholl)
- Lochaber Loch (Dumfries and Galloway)
- Lochend Loch (South Ayrshire)
- Lochend Loch (Coatbridge)
- Lochenkit Loch (Dumfries and Galloway)
- Lochindorb (south of Nairn)
- Lochinvar (Dumfries and Galloway) (reservoir)
- Lochmill Loch (Fife)
- Lochnagar (Grampian)
- Lochrutton Loch (Dumfries and Galloway)
- Loch Lochy (Lochaber, Highland)
- Loch an Lòin (north of Kishorn)
- Loch na Loinne (south of Drumbeg, Sutherland)
- Loirston Loch (Aberdeen)
- Loch of Lomashion (Duncansby Head, Caithness)
- Loch Lomond (West Dunbartonshire/Argyll and Bute/Stirling district)
- Loch Lòn na h-Uamha (Inverpolly, Wester Ross)
- Long Loch (Renfrewshire)
- Long Loch (Angus)
- Long Loch of Glenhead (Dumfries and Galloway)
- Long Loch of the Dungeon (Dumfries and Galloway)
- Loch nan Losgann (Argyll and Bute)
- Loch o' th' Lowes, New Cumnock, (East Ayrshire)
- Loch of the Lowes (near Dunkeld, Perth and Kinross)
- Loch of the Lowes (adjacent to St Mary's Loch)
- Lowes Loch, Ayrshire
- Loch Loyal (Sutherland)
- Loch Loyne (Inverness-shire) (reservoir)
- Loch nan Lùb (north of Lochinver, Sutherland)
- Loch Lubnaig (Callander, Stirling)
- Loch Luchd Choire (Sutherland)
- Loch Luichart (Wester Ross) (reservoir)
- Loch of Lumgair (Aberdeenshire)
- Lundie Loch (Dundee)
- Loch Lundie (Applecross)
- Loch Lundie (near Plockton, Lochalsh)
- Loch Lundie (north of Invergarry, Great Glen)
- Lochan Lùnn Dà-bhrà (Lochaber)
- Loch Lunndaidh (west of Golspie, Sutherland)
- Loch Lurgainn (Coigach, Wester Ross)
- Lussa Loch (Kintyre) (reservoir)
- Loch Lyon (Perth and Kinross) (reservoir)

=== M ===
- Loch Maberry (Ayrshire / Dumfries and Galloway)
- Loch Macaterick (Ayrshire)
- Loch Magharaidh (Easter Ross)
- Loch Magillie (Dumfries and Galloway)
- Loch Mahaick (Stirlingshire)
- Maiden Loch (northwest of Lochinver, Sutherland)
- Loch Mallachie (Abernethy Forest)
- Loch Màma (Lochaber)
- Loch Mannoch (Dumfries and Galloway)
- Manse Loch (north of Lochinver, Sutherland)
- Many Lochs (Dunnet Head, Caithness)
- Loch na Maoile (or Loch Maoile) (northeast of Ullapool)
- Loch Maovally (east of Loch Eriboll, Sutherland)
- Loch Maragan (Perth and Kinross)
- Loch Maree (Wester Ross, fourth largest by surface area)
- Marlee Loch (also known as Loch of Drumellie) (Perth and Kinross)
- Martnaham Loch (Ayrshire)
- Loch Meadie (north of Ben Hope, Sutherland)
- Loch Meadaidh (south of Durness, Sutherland)
- Loch Meadie (Sutherland)
- Loch Meadie (Flow Country, Caithness)
- Loch Meadie, Bettyhill (southeast of Bettyhill, Sutherland)
- Loch Meala (southeast of Bettyhill, Sutherland)
- Loch Meall Dheirgidh (east Sutherland)
- Loch Meall a' Bhùirich (east of Glen Oykel, Sutherland)
- Meall Mhor Loch (Argyll and Bute)
- Lochan Meall an t-Suidhe (Ben Nevis) (the 'halfway lochan' on ascent)
- Lochain Meallan a' Chuail (Sutherland)
- Loch Meig (Strathconon) (reservoir)
- Meikle Loch (east of Ellon, Aberdeenshire)
- Loch Meldalloch (Argyll and Bute)
- Lake of Menteith (Stirlingshire)
- Loch Merkland (Sutherland)
- Methven Loch (Perth and Kinross)
- Loch nam Meur (Balmacaan Forest, Inverness-shire) (two nearby lochs sharing same name)
- Loch of Mey (Caithness)
- Loch a' Mhadaidh (Fannich Forest, Wester Ross)
- Loch a Mhadaidh Mór (Fisherfield Forest, Wester Ross)
- Loch a' Mhadail (Inverpolly, Wester Ross)
- Loch Mhoicean (head of Glen Elchaig)
- Lochan a' Mhadaidh Riabhaich (Ardnamurchan)
- Loch Mhic Ghille-chaoile (Glen Einich, Cairngorms)
- Loch Mhic' Ille Riabhaich (southeast of Aultbea, Wester Ross)
- Loch Mhic Mhàirtein (Argyll and Bute)
- Loch Mheugaidh (Rannoch)
- Loch Mhòr (Inverness-shire) (reservoir)
- Loch Mhuilich (north of Loch Monar)
- Loch a' Mhuilinn (northwest of Tongue, Sutherland)
- Loch a' Mhuilinn (west of Strath Halladale, Sutherland)
- Loch a' Mhuilinn (Flow Country, Caithness)
- Loch a' Mhuilinn (Balmacaan Forest, Inverness-shire) (two nearby lochs sharing the same name)
- Loch a’ Mhuillidh (Glen Strathfarrar, Inverness-shire)
- Loch a' Mhuillinn (north of Kinlochbervie, Sutherland)
- Loch a' Mhuirt (east of Scourie, Sutherland)
- Loch a' Mhullaich (west of Torridon)
- Loch Middle (Dumfries and Galloway)
- Loch Migdale (near Bonar Bridge)
- Mill Loch (near Lochmaben, Dumfries and Galloway)
- Milton Loch (Dumfries and Galloway)
- Loch Minnoch (Dumfries and Galloway)
- Mire Loch (St. Abb's Head, Scottish Borders)
- Loch Misirich (Easter Ross)
- Loch na Mnatha (east of Scourie, Sutherland)
- Loch Moan (Dumfries and Galloway)
- Mochrum Loch (Dumfries and Galloway)
- Mochrum Loch (near Maybole, Ayrshire)
- Loch na Mòine (Letterewe Forest, Wester Ross)
- Loch na Mòine Beag (Lochrosque Forest, Wester Ross)
- Loch na Mòine Buige (Wester Ross)
- Loch na Mòine Mór (Lochrosque Forest, Wester Ross)
- Loch Mòine Sheilg (Wester Ross)
- Loch Monaghan (Perth and Kinross) (reservoir)
- Loch Monar (reservoir)
- Monk Myre (Perth and Kinross)
- Loch Monzievaird (Perth and Kinross)
- Moor Loch (Fife)
- Loch Mór Bad an Ducharaich (Strathnasheallag Forest, Wester Ross)
- Loch Mór na Caorach (east of Strathnaver, Sutherland)
- Loch Mór Ceann na Sàile (south of Kinlochbervie, Sutherland)
- Loch Mor a' Chraisg (north of Kinlochbervie, Sutherland)
- Loch Moraig (Atholl)
- Loch Morar, (Lochaber)
- Loch More (Sutherland)
- Loch More (Flow Country, Caithness)
- Loch Morie (Easter Ross)
- Loch Morlich (Cairngorms)
- Morton Lochs, Fife
- Loch Moy (southeast of Inverness)
- Loch na Mucnaich (Reay Forest, Sutherland)
- Loch Mudle (Ardnamurchan)
- Mugdock Loch (near Milngavie)
- Loch Muick (Aberdeenshire)
- Loch Muigh-bhlàraidh (Easter Ross)
- Loch Mullardoch (reservoir)

=== N ===
- Loch Nant (Argyll and Bute) (reservoir)
- Loch Naver (Sutherland)
- Loch Neaty (Eskdale Moor, Inverness-shire)
- Lochan Neimhe (east of Torridon)
- Loch Neldricken, Galloway
- Loch Nell (southeast of Oban)
- Loch Ness, the second largest by surface area and largest by volume
- Nicholl's Loch (Angus)
- Loch an Nighe Leathaid (beneath Arkle, Sutherland)
- Loch an Nid (Fisherfield Forest, Wester Ross)
- Loch Noir (southeast of Forres)
- Loch an Nostarie (southeast of Mallaig)

=== O ===
- Loch Ob an Lochain (northeast of Ullapool) (continuous with Loch Dubh and Loch Dubh Beag)
- Loch Ochiltree (Dumfries and Galloway)
- Loch Oich (Great Glen) (level artificially raised)
- Loch na h-Oidhche (Flowerdale Forest, Wester Ross)
- Loch Olginey (Caithness)
- Loch Ordie (Perth and Kinross)
- Loch Ore (Fife)
- Loch Osgaig (Coigach, Wester Ross)
- Loch Ospisdale near Dornoch, (artificial)
- Loch Ossian

=== P ===
- Pitlyal Loch (Angus)
- Loch nam Paitean (Moidart)
- Palm Loch (east of Strathnaver, Sutherland)
- Loch of Park (east of Banchory, Aberdeenshire) (marsh)
- Loch Patrick (Dumfries and Galloway)
- Loch Pattack (Badenoch)
- Loch Phadruig (Braemar)
- Loch a' Phearsainn (Argyll and Bute)
- Loch a' Phreasan Chailltean (south of Kinlochbervie, Sutherland)
- Loch a' Phuill Bhuidhe (south of Cape Wrath, Sutherland)
- Loch Pityoulish (east of Aviemore)
- Plaid Loch near Drongan, East Ayrshire
- Loch Poll (Assynt, Sutherland)
- Loch Poll Daidh (north of Lochinver, Sutherland)
- Pond of Drummond (Perth and Kinross)
- Portmore Loch (Scottish Borders)
- Possil Loch (near Glasgow)
- Loch Poulary (on River Garry)
- Loch Preas nan Aighean (northeast of Lochinver, Sutherland)
- Loch Preas nan Sgiathanach (Sutherland)
- Loch Prille (Ross and Cromarty)

=== Q ===
- Loch Quoich (reservoir)

=== R ===
- Loch Raa (Coigach, Wester Ross)
- Loch Racadal (Argyll and Bute)
- Loch Rangag (northwest of Lybster, Caithness)
- Loch Rannoch (Perth and Kinross)
- Rae Loch (Perth and Kinross)
- Redmyre Loch (Dundee)
- Rescobie Loch (Angus)
- Loch Restil (Argyll and Bute)
- Rhifail Loch (east of Strathnaver, Sutherland)
- Loch Riabhachain (east of Cannich, Inverness-shire))
- Loch Riecawr (Ayrshire) (reservoir)
- Loch Rifa-gil (east of Strathnaver, Sutherland)
- Loch Rimsdale (Sutherland)
- Loch Roan (Dumfries and Galloway)
- Romach Loch (south of Forres)
- Loch Romain (Argyll and Bute)
- Loch Rosail (east of Strathnaver, Sutherland)
- Rotmell Loch (Perth and Kinross)
- Round Loch of Glenhead (Dumfries and Galloway)
- Round Loch of the Dungeon (Dumfries and Galloway)
- Loch Roy (beneath Creag Meagaidh)
- Loch Ruard (northwest of Lybster, Caithness)
- Loch an Ruathair (north of Kinbrace, Sutherland)
- Loch na Ruighe Duibhe (south of Cannich, Inverness-shire)
- Loch Rumsdale (Flow Country, Caithness)
- Loch Rusky (Stirlingshire)
- Loch Ruthven (southeast of Loch Ness, Inverness-shire)
- Loch Ronald (Dumfries and Galloway)

=== S ===
- St. John's Loch (Dunnet, Caithness)
- St Margaret's Loch, artificial loch in Holyrood Park, Edinburgh
- St. Mary's Loch (Scottish Borders)
- Loch Sàinn (Flow Country, Caithness)
- Loch Saird (Flow Country, Caithness)
- Loch Salachaidh (west of Golspie, Sutherland)
- Sand Loch (Aberdeenshire)
- Loch Sand (northwest of Dunbeath, Caithness)
- Sandwood Loch (north of Kinlochbervie, Sutherland)
- Loch na Saobhaidhe (east of Strathnaver, Sutherland)
- Loch Saorach (Caithness)
- Lochan Saorach (Perthshire)
- Loch of Sarclet (Thrumster, Caithness)
- Loch Saugh (Angus) (reservoir)
- Loch Scalloch (Ayrshire)
- Loch Scalpaidh (Kyle of Lochalsh)
- Loch Scammadale (south of Oban)
- Loch Scarmclate (Caithness)
- Loch Scaven (Wester Ross)
- Loch Scoly (Perth and Kinross)
- Scrabster Loch (Caithness)
- Loch Scridain (Mull)
- Loch Scye (Caithness)
- Loch Sealbhanach (Glen Cannich, Inverness-shire)
- Loch na Sealga (Wester Ross)
- Loch an t-Seana-bhaile (northwest of Gairloch, Wester Ross)
- Loch an t-Seilg (north of Ben Hee, Sutherland)
- Loch na Seilg (beneath Ben Hope, Sutherland)
- Loch na Seilge (east of Arkle, Sutherland)
- Loch na Seilge (Flow Country, Caithness)
- Loch an t-Seilich (Gaick Forest)
- Loch Sgamhain (Glen Carron)
- Loch na Sgeallaig (Corrour)
- Loch Sgeireach (Fannich Forest, Wester Ross)
- Loch Sgeireach (southwest of Loch Shin, Sutherland)
- Lochan Sgeireach (Sutherland)
- Loch an Sgòir (Ben Alder)
- Loch Sguod (west of Loch Ewe, Wester Ross)
- Loch Shandra (Glen Isla)
- Shankston Loch, (Ayrshire)
- Shaws Under Loch (Scottish Borders)
- Shaws Upper Loch (Scottish Borders)
- Loch Sheilah (north of Alness, Easter Ross)
- Loch Shield East Ayrshire
- Loch Shiel, (Lochaber, Highland)
- Shielswood Loch (Scottish Borders)
- Loch Shin, the seventh largest by surface area (reservoir)
- Lochan Shira (Argyll and Bute) (hardly a lochan, now a reservoir)
- Loch Shurrery (Caithness)
- Loch Sian (off Loch Eriboll, Sutherland)
- Loch an t-Sidhein (northeast of Carrbridge)
- Loch Sionascaig (Inverpolly, Wester Ross)
- Sìor Loch (east of Oban)
- Loch Skae (Dumfries and Galloway)
- Loch Skeen (Dumfries and Galloway)
- Loch Skelloch, (Ayrshire)
- Loch of Skene (Aberdeenshire)
- Skeroblin Loch (Kintyre)
- Loch Skerrow (Dumfries and Galloway)
- Loch Skiach (Perth and Kinross)
- Skyline Loch (Flow Country, Caithness)
- Loch An T-Slagain (Rubha Mor, Wester Ross)
- Loch Sletill (Flow Country, Caithness)
- Loch Sloy (reservoir)
- Loch na Smeòraich (near Plockton, Lochalsh)
- Loch Soy (or Loch of Soy) (Portsoy, Aberdeenshire)
- Soulseat Loch (Dumfries and Galloway)
- Loch Spallander, (reservoir) (Ayrshire)
- Loch nan Spréidh (Sutherland)
- Loch Spynie (north of Elgin)
- Loch Srath nan Aisinnin (Glendhu Forest, Sutherland)
- Loch na Sròine Luime (top of Glen Cassley, Sutherland)
- Lochan Sròn Mór (Argyll and Bute) (reservoir)
- Lochan Sròn Smeur (Rannoch Moor)
- Loch Srùban Beaga (Sutherland)
- Loch Srùban Móra (Sutherland)
- Loch ma Stac (?spelling) (south of Cannich, Inverness-shire)
- Loch Stack (Sutherland)
- Loch Staing (south of Loch Loyal, Sutherland)
- Lochan na Stainge (Rannoch Moor)
- Loch Staonsaid (south of Loch Eriboll, Sutherland)
- Loch of Stemster (northwest of Lybster, Caithness)
- Stevenston Loch (a.k.a. Ashgrove Loch) (Ayrshire)
- The Still Loch (Argyll and Bute)
- Stormont Loch (Perth and Kinross)
- Loch of Strathbeg (Buchan)
- Strathclyde Loch (Motherwell)
- Loch Strathy (east of Strathnaver, Sutherland)
- Loch Syre (west of Strathnaver, Sutherland)

=== T ===
- Loch an Tachdaich (Wester Ross)
- Tangy Loch (Kintyre)
- Loch Tarbhaidh (east of Loch Naver, Sutherland)
- Loch Tarbhaidh (northeast of Rhiconich, Sutherland)
- Loch Tarff (southeast of Loch Ness)
- Loch Tarsan A loch in Argyll, formed by the flooding parts of Glen Lean and Glen Tarsan for hydroelectricity production
- Loch Tarvie (near Dornoch)
- Loch Tay, the sixth largest by surface area
- Loch Teacuis (small loch running south east off the ‘start’ of Loch Sunart)
- Loch Teàrnait (Morvern)
- Loch Thom, early artificial reservoir
- Loch Thormaid (Caithness)
- Loch na Thuill (south of Rhiconich, Sutherland)
- Loch Thulachan (northwest of Lybster, Caithness)
- Loch Tigh na Creige (Sutherland)
- Loch an Tigh Sheilg (southeast of Rhiconich, Sutherland)
- Loch Tilt (Atholl)
- Loch of Toftingall (Caithness)
- Toll Lochan (Sutherland)
- Loch Tollaidh (Wester Ross)
- Loch Toll an Lochain (Fannich Forest, Wester Ross)
- Loch Toll an Lochain (beneath An Teallach, Wester Ross)
- Loch Toll nam Biast (north of Beinn Alligin)
- Loch Toll a' Mhadaidh (Fisherfield Forest, Wester Ross)
- Loch Torr na Ceàrdaich (Caithness)
- Loch nan Torran (Argyll and Bute)
- Loch na Totaig (Coigach, Wester Ross)
- Town Loch Dunfermline, Fife
- Loch Tralaig (Argyll and Bute)
- Loch Treig (reservoir)
- Na Tri Lochan (Inverpolly, Wester Ross)
- Loch Tromlee (Argyll and Bute)
- Loch Trool (Galloway)
- Loch Truderscaig (Sutherland)
- Loch na Tuadh (between Foinaven and Arkle, Sutherland)
- Lochan Tuath (Coigach, Wester Ross)
- Loch Tuill Bhearnach (north of Loch Mullardoch, Ross and Cromarty)
- Loch an Tuill Riabhaich (Sutherland)
- Loch Tuim Ghlais (Caithness)
- Loch an Tuirc (northeast of Lochinver, Sutherland)
- Loch Tulla, (Bridge of Orchy, Argyll and Bute)
- Loch Tullybelton (Perth and Kinross)
- Loch Tummel (reservoir)
- Loch Turret (Perth and Kinross) (reservoir)

=== U ===
- Loch na h-Uamhaidh Beag (west of Loch Ewe, Wester Ross)
- Loch na h-Uamhaidh Móire (west of Loch Ewe, Wester Ross)
- Loch na h-Uamhaig (west of Beinn Alligin)
- Loch nan Uan (west of Ben Klibreck, Sutherland)
- Loch Uanagan (near Fort Augustus)
- Loch Uidh Tarraigean (Inverpolly, Wester Ross)
- Loch na h-Uidhe (Wester Ross)
- Loch Uisge (Kingairloch)
- Loch Ulagadale (Argyll and Bute)
- Loch Ulbhach Coire (Sutherland)
- Loch an Ulbhaidh (northeast of Loch Shin, Sutherland)
- Loch Ullachie (Aberdeenshire)
- Loch Unapool (Kylesku, Sutherland)
- Loch Urigill (Ledmore, Sutherland)
- Loch Urr (Dumfries and Galloway)
- Loch Ussie (near Dingwall)

=== V ===
- Loch Vaa (north of Aviemore)
- Loch Vaich (Strathvaich Forest, Wester Ross) (reservoir)
- Loch Valley Galloway
- Loch Vatachan (Coigach, Wester Ross)
- Loch Venachar (reservoir)
- Loch Veyatie (Sutherland/Wester Ross)
- Loch Voil (near Balquidder, Stirlingshire)
- Loch Vrotachan (northwest of The Cairnwell)

=== W ===
- Loch Walton (Stirlingshire)
- Loch of Warehouse (Ulbster, Caithness)
- Loch Watenan (Ulbster, Caithness)
- Loch Watston (Stirlingshire)
- Loch Watten (Caithness) loch famous for its trout
- Wee Berbeth Loch (near Dalmellington, East Ayrshire)
- Loch of Wester (Caithness)
- Wester Loch of Daldorn (Stirlingshire)
- Loch Wharral (Glen Clova)
- Loch Whinyeon (Dumfries and Galloway)
- White Loch (Dumfries and Galloway) (grid reference NX107608)
- White Loch (Dumfries and Galloway) (grid reference NX864547)
- White Loch (Dumfries and Galloway) (grid reference NX400440)
- White Loch (East Renfrewshire) (grid reference NS488522)
- White Loch (grid reference NS961471)
- White Loch (grid reference NO169429)
- White Loch of Myrton (Dumfries and Galloway) (grid reference NX358435)
- White Moss Loch (Perth and Kinross)
- Whitefield Loch (Dumfries and Galloway)
- Whitehill Loch East Ayrshire
- Whittliemuir Midton Loch (near Paisley) (reservoir)
- Williestruther Loch (Scottish Borders)
- Loch of Winless (Caithness)
- Wooden Loch (Scottish Borders)
- Woodend Loch (Coatbridge)
- Woodhall Loch (Dumfries and Galloway)

=== X ===
No entries

=== Y ===
- Loch of Yarrows (Ulbster, Caithness)
- Yetholm Loch (Scottish Borders)

=== Z ===
No entries

== Lochs on islands ==
There are a very large number of lochs on the islands of Scotland, with the greatest density occurring in the Outer Hebrides. North and South Uist and Lewis in particular have landscapes with a high percentage of freshwater and a maze and complexity of loch shapes. Harris has fewer large bodies of water but innumerable small lochans.

=== Larger ===
Those listed in this section are confined to the larger or otherwise notable lochs.

Loch Orasaigh in Lewis is only about 125 hectares (310 acres) in extent but the island of Rainish Eilean Mòr is probably the largest island in Scotland relative to the size of the body of water it sits in, as it takes up about 20% of the loch's surface area.

The meanings of the names are generally derived from Gaelic, Old Norse or Scots.

Loch	Meaning of name	Island	OS Grid ref.	Area (ha)	Area (acre)	Depth (m)	Depth (ft)	Notes
Loch a' Phuill	Gaelic: Loch of the bog or pool	Tiree	NL955415					Located in the south west near Balephuil.
Loch Ascog	Norse: Loch of ash bay	Bute	NS094626	44.7	110			Located south of Rothesay.
Loch Bà		Mull	NM569376	324	800	44	144	
Loch Barabhat		Great Bernera	NB156353					
Loch Bì		South Uist	NF766438			10	33	South Uist's largest loch is in the north of the island and at 8 kilometres (5.0 mi) long it all but cuts the island in two.
Loch of Boardhouse		Mainland Orkney	HY268264	244	600	5	16	In Birsay parish
Loch Carabhat		Grimsay	NF857566					
Loch Carabhat		North Uist	NF846613	151	370	22.5	74	North Uist's third largest loch
Loch of Cliff		Unst	HP600117	104	260	6.5	21	5 kilometres (3.1 mi) long and the most northerly loch in Britain.
Loch Coruisk	Gaelic: Loch of the corrie of water	Skye	NG482206			38.4	126	Located in the heart of the Black Cuillin mountains on Skye.
Loch Druidibeag		South Uist	NF791374	500	1,200			Part of the Loch Druidibeg National Nature Reserve on the west coast of South Uist.
Loch Fad	Gaelic: Long loch	Bute	NS074616	71	180	11.5	38	Stocked with brown and rainbow trout the loch is an SSSI.
Loch Fada		Colonsay	NR385955					Colonsay's largest loch
Loch Fada Gobha		Lewis	NB245232	125	310	14	46	This loch, which lies between Lochs Treabhal and Langavat, is 3 kilometres (1.9 mi) long.
Loch Finlaggan	Loch of the white hollow	Islay	NR387679					Eilean Mor was an administration centre of the Lordship of the Isles during the 13th—15th centuries. The English name is derived from Gaelic, but the Gaelic name itself is Port an Eilein and means "island port".
Loch Frisa		Mull	NM490480	430	1,100	62.5	205	Mull's largest loch
Loch of Girlsta		Mainland Shetland	HU433519			20	66	
Loch Gorm	Blue loch	Islay	NR229657					Contains Loch Gorm Castle, once a stronghold of Clan Macdonald.
Loch of Harray	Norse: Loch of the mound	Mainland Orkney	HY295151	971	2,400	4	13	Closely linked to the Heart of Neolithic Orkney World Heritage site.
Heldale Water		Hoy	ND259924					One of the largest bodies of freshwater in Orkney not on the Mainland
Loch Langavat	Gaelic/Norse: Long lake	Lewis	NB197205	906.5	2,240	30	98	This loch lies at 33 metres (108 ft) above sea level, is over 11 kilometres (6.8 mi) long and is at the head of the Grimersta system.
Loch Langavat	Gaelic/Norse: Long lake	Harris	NG044897					
Loch Leathan	Gaelic: Broad Loch	Skye	NG500507					This loch to the east of Portree, which includes Loch Fada, is about 5 kilometres (3.1 mi) long.
Loch Mealt		Skye	NG507656					Located south of Ellishadder, on the eastern side of the Trotternish peninsula
Loch Mòr	Gaelic: Big loch	Boreray	NF850813					A shallow loch that make up about an eighth of the area of the island
Muckle Water	Scots: Big lake	Rousay	HY393901					One of the largest bodies of freshwater in Orkney not on the Mainland
Loch nan Cinneachan	Gaelic: Loch of the "heathen" or "gentiles".	Coll	NM187562					Contains the crannog Dùn Anlaimh
Loch Olabhat		Benbecula	NF798509					One of Benbecula's larger lochs, it contains numerous islands.
Loch Orasaigh	Gaelic: Tidal island loch?	Lewis	NB388281					Contains Rainish Eilean Mòr (see above).
Loch Righ Mòr	Gaelic: Great loch of the king	Jura	NR540852					
Loch Sgadabhagh	Norse: Possibly Loch of tax bay	North Uist	NF847685	453	1,120	15	49	According to Murray and Pullar (1910) "there is probably no other loch in Britain which approaches Loch Scadavay in irregularity and complexity of outline."
Loch an Sgoltaire		Colonsay	NR386972					
Loch of Spiggie		Shetland	HU370165	86	210	12.5	41	Part of an RSPB Nature reserve, the surface is only just over a metre above sea level.
Loch of Stenness	Norse: Loch of the headland of the stone	Mainland Orkney	HY280126	647	1,600	5	16	The largest brackish lagoon in the UK, the Stones of Stenness are on the south east shore.
Loch of St Tredwell	Loch of St Tredwell	Papa Westray	HY492508			10	33	Named after St Triduana, the loch's waters were traditionally believed to be medicinal.
Loch Suaineabhal	Loch of Sweyn's Fell	Lewis	NB069297	226	560	66.7	219	This glaciated loch basin has a mean depth of 33 metres (108 ft) and is the most voluminous on Lewis. The loch may be the deepest on any offshore island in the British Isles.
Loch of Swannay		Orkney	HY309283	244	600	5	16	Located in the north west of Mainland Orkney there are numerous stony shoals in the loch.
Loch of Tankerness	Norse: Possibly Loch of Tannskári's point.	Mainland Orkney	HY514092	60	150	2	6 ft 7 in	North east of Kirkwall, the loch's mean depth is only 1.4 metres (4.6 ft).
Loch Tanna		Arran	NR921430					Arran's largest loch is 321 metres above sea level.
Loch of Tingwall	Norse: Loch of the field of the parliament	Mainland Shetland	HU416425	43	110	12	39	West of Lerwick
Loch Trealabhal		Lewis	NB277236	157	390	10.5	34	Another shallow Hebridean loch with a complex shape.
Loch of Watlee	Norse:	Unst	HP592054					

=== Smaller ===
Less substantial lochs include the following.

- Lismore: Loch Fiart, Kilcheran Loch, Loch Baile a' Ghobhainn
- Orkney: see List of lochs in Orkney
- Shetland:
  - Mainland Shetland: Clickimin Loch
  - Whalsay: Loch of Houll, Loch of Huxter, Loch of Isbister, Loch of Livister, Loch of Sandwick, Loch of Stanefield, Loch of Vats-houll, Nuckro Water, East Loch of Skaw, West Loch of Skaw

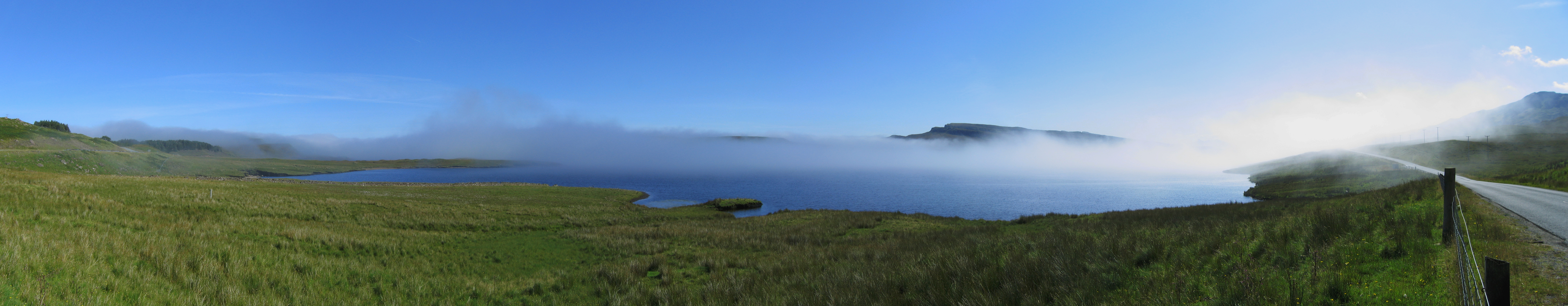
Loch Leathan, Skye

== Historic lochs ==
- In Edinburgh –
  - Gogarloch – drained
  - Nor Loch — now filled in
  - The Meadows – former Burghloch
- In Ayrshire –
  - Fail Loch – drained in the late 1840s.
  - Loch Brand – a loch of only around 2 ha (4.9 acres), drained in 1780 and found to contain a crannog.
  - Loch Brown – a loch of 60 acres (24 ha) near Mauchline, mostly drained in the 19th century.
  - Knockewart Loch – also known as Jargon Loch, now drained.
  - Lambroughton Loch – a small loch near Kilmaurs, drained in the 16th century.
  - Halket Loch – also known as Hawkhead, near Lugton, covered about 10 acres (40,000 m^{2}) and was drained in the 1840s.
  - Helenton Loch – now drained.
  - Lochlea, South Ayrshire – a loch of around 19 acres (7.7 ha) near Tarbolton, which famously contained a Crannog. It was drained by the mid-19th century.
  - Lochspouts – a small loch near Maybole, Ayrshire, with a crannog. Converted into a reservoir and drained in 2003.
  - Newfarm Loch – a large curling pond, drained in the 20th century.
  - South Palmerston Loch (Ochiltree) – reduced to a small vegetated pond
  - Trindlemoss Loch – a drained loch also known as Scott's Loch.

== See also ==
- List of freshwater islands in Scotland
- List of sea lochs of Scotland
- List of lochs in Orkney
- List of Irish lochs and loughs
- Loch Line (shipping line)
- List of rivers in Scotland
- Waterfalls of Scotland
- List of lakes and lochs in the United Kingdom
- List of reservoirs and dams in the United Kingdom
- Map of Lochs of Scotland compiled from this list
- List of places in Scotland
