= Aucha Lochy =

Lake in Argyll and Bute, Scotland

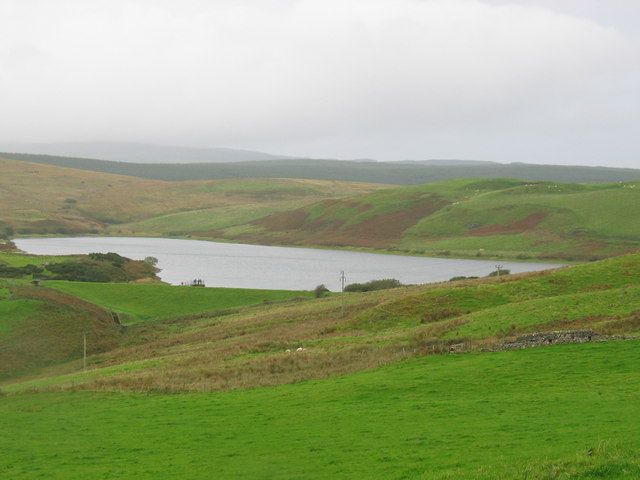

- Location within Scotland
- Location: Campbeltown, Scotland
- Coordinates: 55.4443°N 5.5964°W
- Type: Reservoir (earth embankment dam)
- Primary outflows: Auchalochy Burn
- Basin countries: Scotland, United Kingdom
- Surface area: 117,400 m^{2} (1,264,000 sq ft)
- Water volume: 463,000 m^{3} (375 acre⋅ft)
- Surface elevation: 97 m (318 ft)

National grid reference NR72532231

Aucha Lochy is an impounding reservoir, situated 1 km to the north/north east of Campbeltown and is the main source of freshwater for the town. The loch is also fished by Kintyre Angling Club. The earth fill dam was completed in 1905 and has a height of 8.8 metres.

== See also ==
- List of lochs in Scotland
- List of reservoirs and dams in the United Kingdom

== Sources ==
- "Argyll and Bute Council Reservoirs Act 1975 Public Register"
