= Auchintaple Loch =

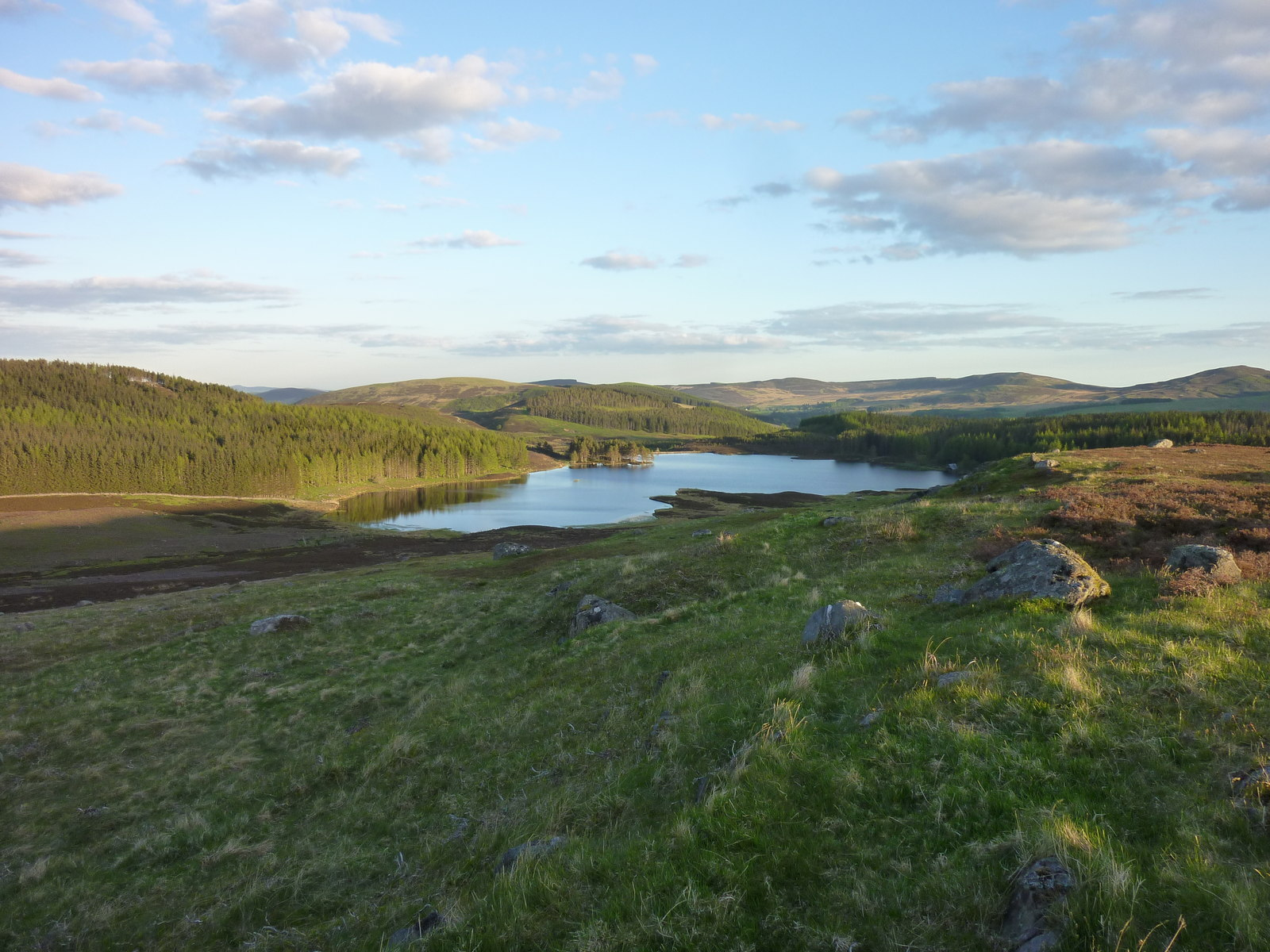
- A view of the loch from The Knaps in Angus

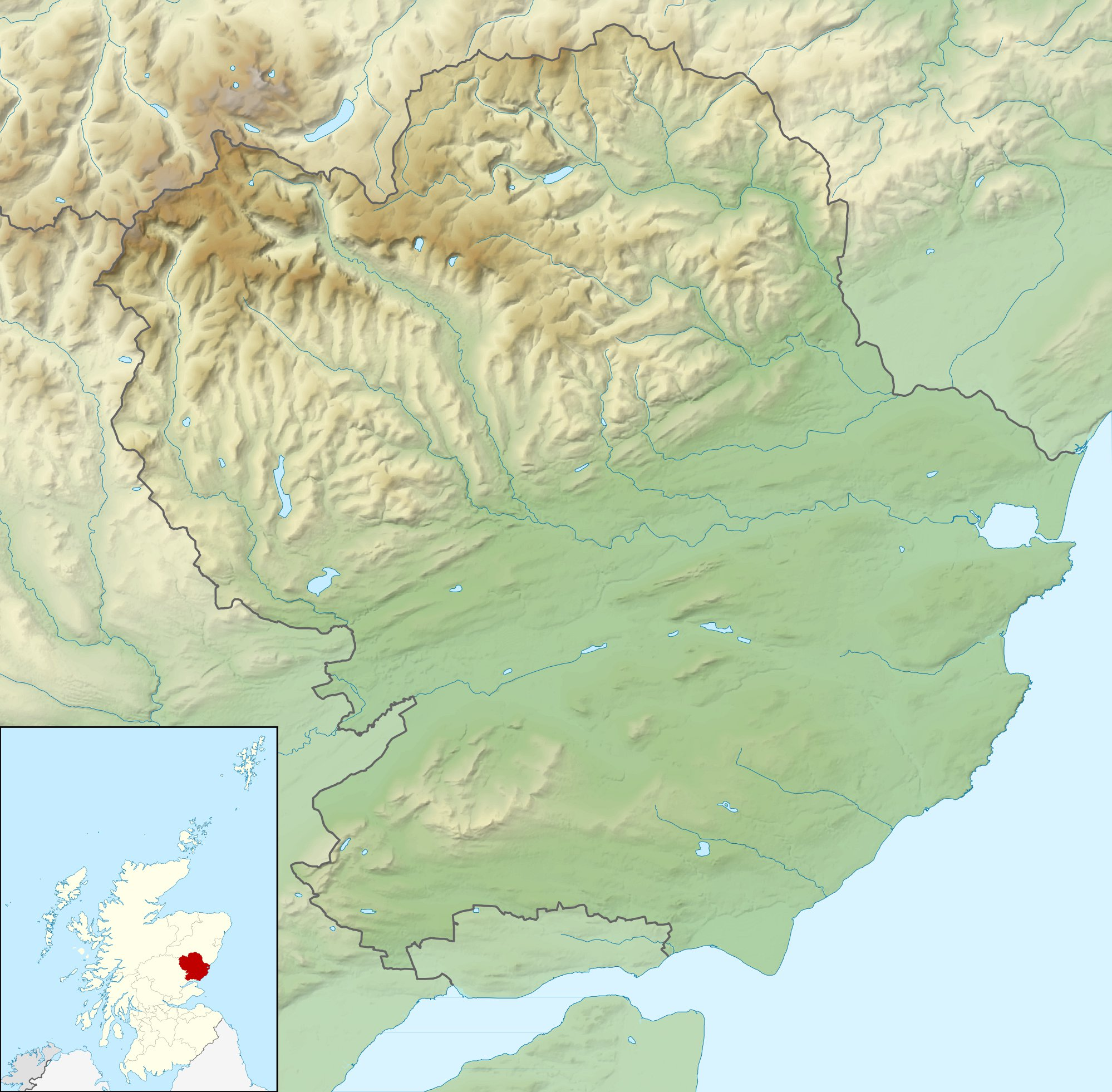
- Location in Angus
- Location: NO19656476
- Coordinates: 56.76739883°N 3.31668934°W
- Type: freshwater loch
- Primary outflows: Allt na Beinne into River Isla
- Max. length: 0.5310 km (0.3299 mi)
- Max. width: 0.4023 km (0.2500 mi)
- Surface area: 13 ha (32 acres)
- Average depth: 15 ft (4.6 m)
- Max. depth: 17 ft (5.2 m)
- Water volume: 23,966,484 ft^{3} (678,655.3 m^{3})
- Shore length^{1}: 2 km (1.2 mi)
- Surface elevation: 356 m (1,168 ft)
- Max. temperature: 58.0 °F (14.4 °C)
- Min. temperature: 57.5 °F (14.2 °C)
- Islands: 0
- ^{1} Shore length is not a well-defined measure.

Auchintaple Loch also known as Auchenchapel Loch, is a small shallow freshwater loch that is located in Glen Isla in Angus, Scotland.

== See also ==
- List of lochs in Scotland
