= Monk Myre =

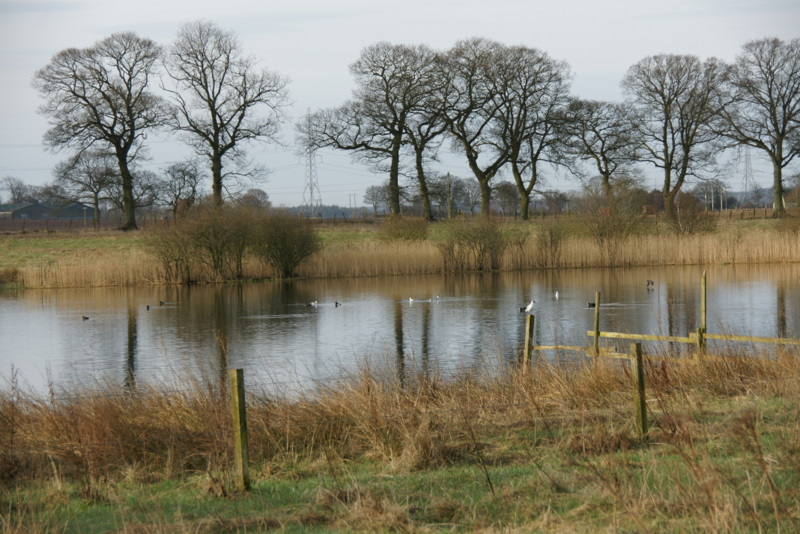
- The west end of the little lochan.

- Location within Perth and Kinross
- Location: NO20954273
- Coordinates: 56.56969°N 3.289185°W
- Type: freshwater loch
- Max. length: 0.8 km (0.50 mi)
- Max. width: 0.22 km (0.14 mi)
- Surface area: 5 ha (12 acres)
- Average depth: 5 ft (1.5 m)
- Max. depth: 12 ft (3.7 m)
- Water volume: 5,552,000 ft^{3} (157,200 m^{3})
- Shore length^{1}: 1 km (0.62 mi)
- Surface elevation: 46 m (151 ft)
- Max. temperature: 55.8 °F (13.2 °C)
- Min. temperature: 55.8 °F (13.2 °C)
- Islands: 0
- ^{1} Shore length is not a well-defined measure.

Monk Myre is a small shallow freshwater lochan and is located 2.5 miles southeast of Blairgowrie in Perth and Kinross.

== Geography ==
Monk Myre is of glacial origin and is formed as a type of geographic formation known as a kettle that has partially silted up. The loch is a designated Site of Special Scientific Interest (SSSI), as well as forming part of a Special Area of Conservation.

== See also ==
- List of lochs in Scotland
