= Loch Skae =

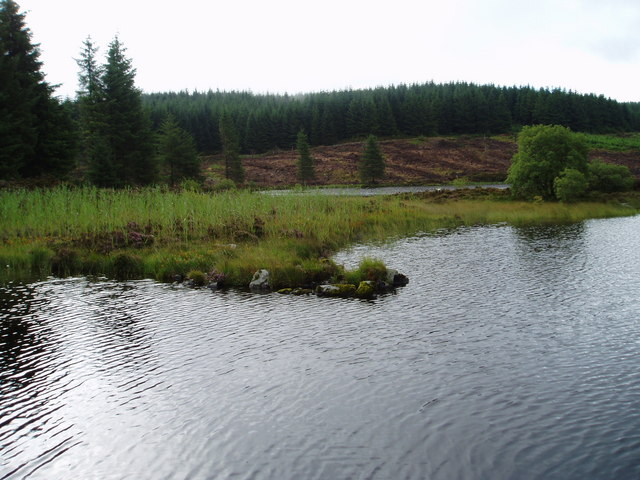

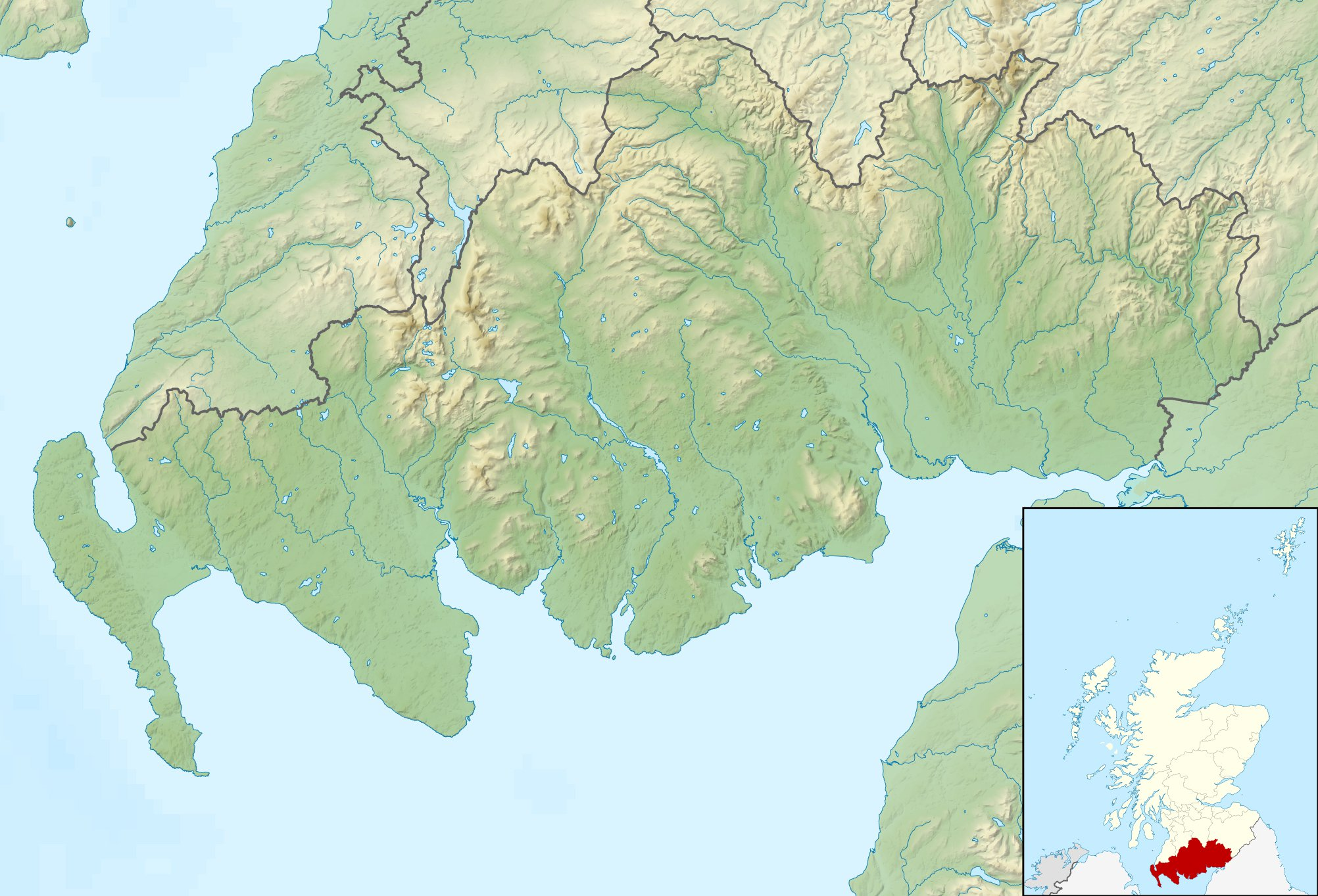
- Location within Dumfries and Galloway
- Location: Dumfries and Galloway, Scotland
- Coordinates: 55.1308°N 4.0246°W
- Type: freshwater loch
- Primary outflows: Loch Skae Burn
- Basin countries: Scotland
- Max. length: 0.75 mi (1.21 km)
- Max. width: 0.25 mi (0.40 km)
- Surface area: 8.3 ha (21 acres)
- Average depth: 9.5 ft (2.9 m)
- Max. depth: 35 ft (11 m)
- Water volume: 8,000,000 ft^{3} (230,000 m^{3})
- Shore length^{1}: 1.1 km (0.68 mi)
- Surface elevation: 267 m (876 ft)
- Islands: 0
- ^{1} Shore length is not a well-defined measure.

Loch Skae is a small, upland freshwater loch to the north of Blackcraig Hill, approximately 18 miles (29 km) west of Dumfries, Scotland, 0.5 mi (0.80 km) east of Loch Howie, and 1 mi (1.6 km) south of the A702. The loch is somewhat circular in shape with a maximum diameter of 0.25 mi (0.40 km) from north to south. It has an average depth of 9.5 ft (2.9 m) and is 35 ft (11 m) at its deepest point. The loch was surveyed on 29 July 1903 by James Murray as part of Sir John Murray's Bathymetrical Survey of Fresh-Water Lochs of Scotland 1897-1909.
