= Loch Bhac =

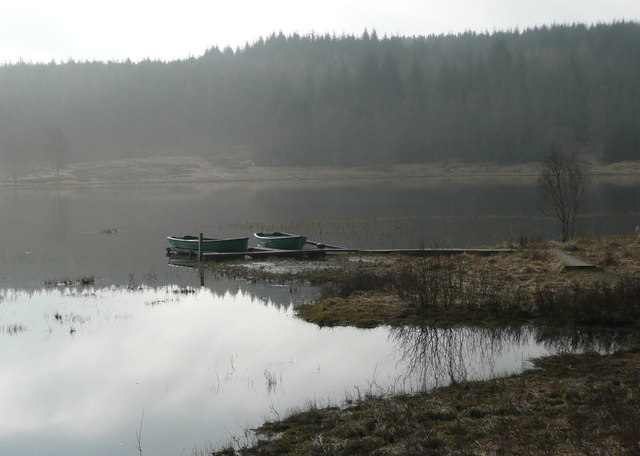
- Loch Bhac

- Location within Perth and Kinross
- Location: NN822622
- Coordinates: 56.737°N 3.9270°W
- Type: freshwater loch
- Max. length: 1.28748 km (0.80000 mi)
- Max. width: 0.257 km (0.160 mi)
- Surface area: 12.2 ha (30 acres)
- Average depth: 3.5 ft (1.1 m)
- Max. depth: 9 ft (2.7 m)
- Water volume: 9,818,000 ft^{3} (278,000 m^{3})
- Shore length^{1}: 1.5 km (0.93 mi)
- Surface elevation: 326 m (1,070 ft)
- Max. temperature: 54.3 °F (12.4 °C)
- Min. temperature: 55 °F (13 °C)
- Islands: 0
- ^{1} Shore length is not a well-defined measure.

Loch Bhac (Bhaic or Vach) is a fine freshwater trout loch, located in the west part of the Allean Forest, and east part of Tay Forest park, and slightly north of Loch Tummel, within Perth and Kinross, Scotland. Loch Bhac sits on a south-west to north-east orientation.

== Walking ==
There is a circular walk that encompasses the whole of Loch Bhac at a length of 7.5 miles.

== Gallery ==
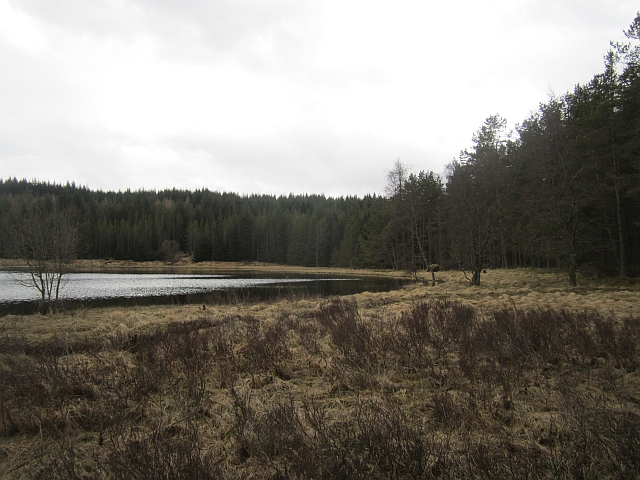
West coast of Loch Bhac

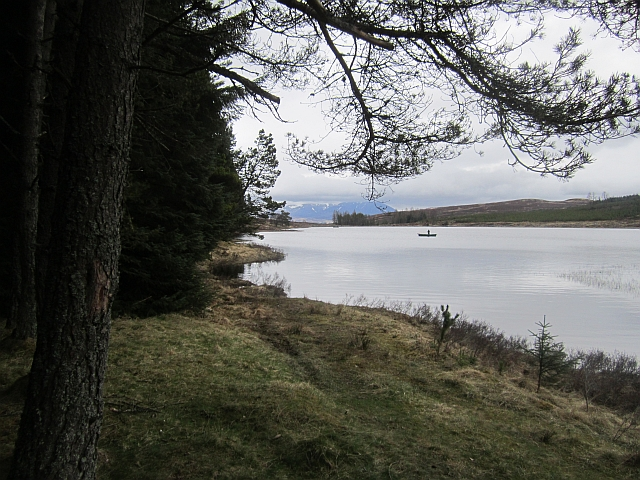
Another view of the west coast

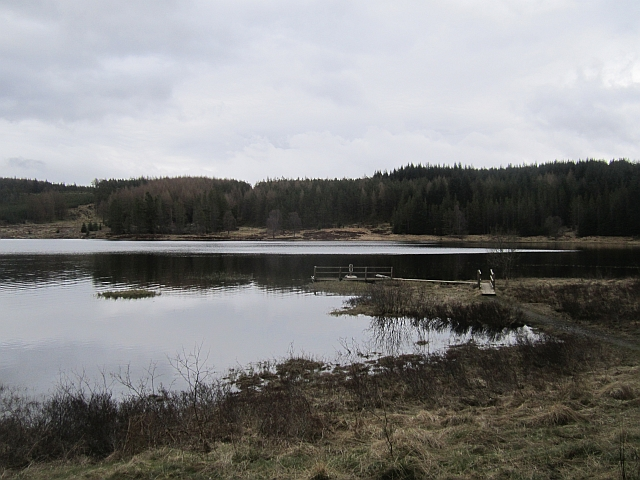
Small pier at the loch

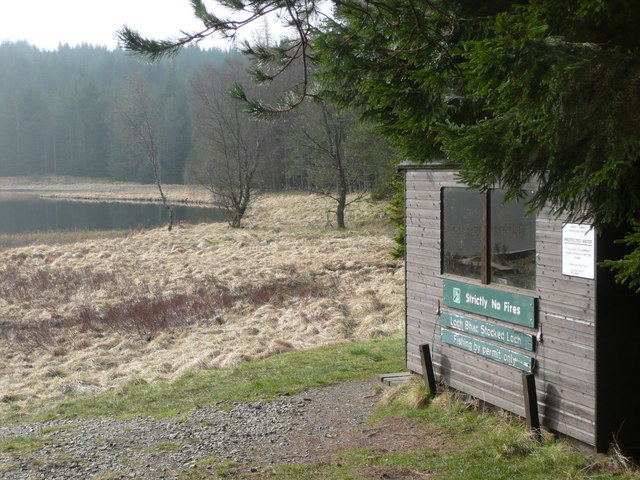
Anglers hut at Loch Bhac

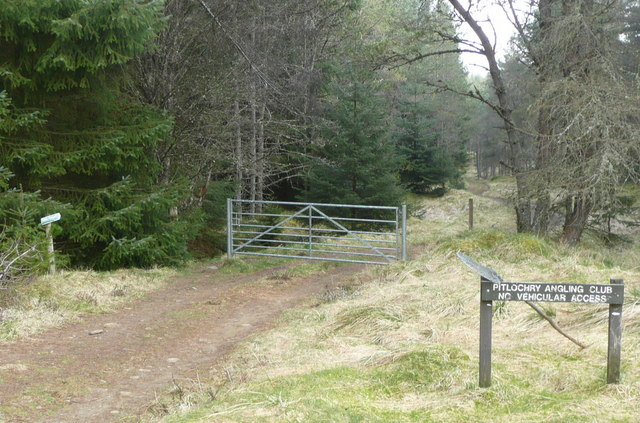
Entrance to walk at Loch Bhac
