= Wooden Loch =

Loch in the Scottish Borders

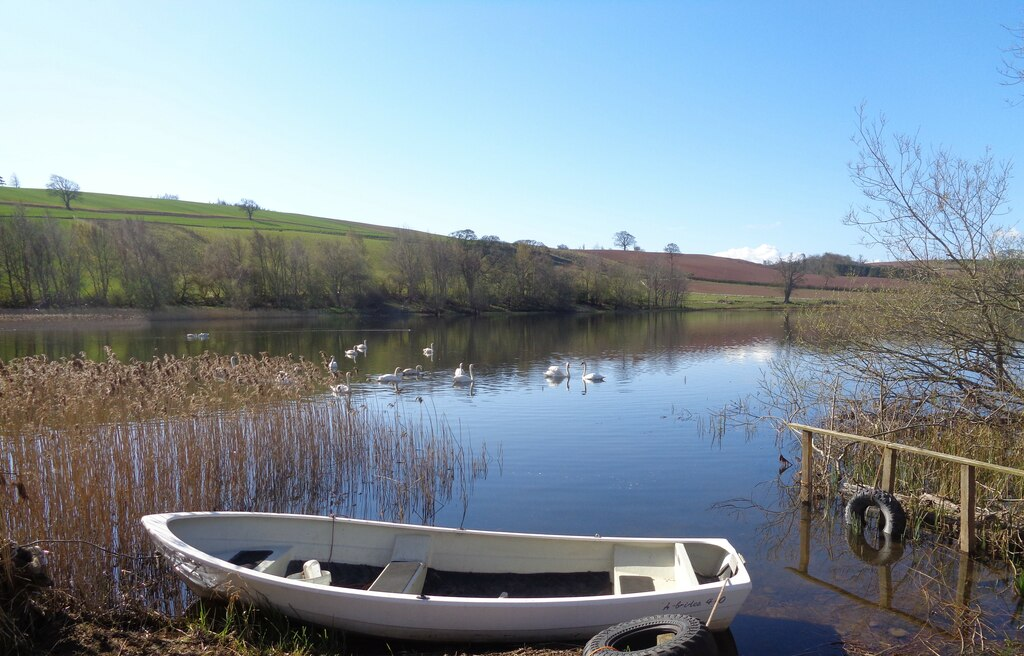
- Wooden Loch from its north shore

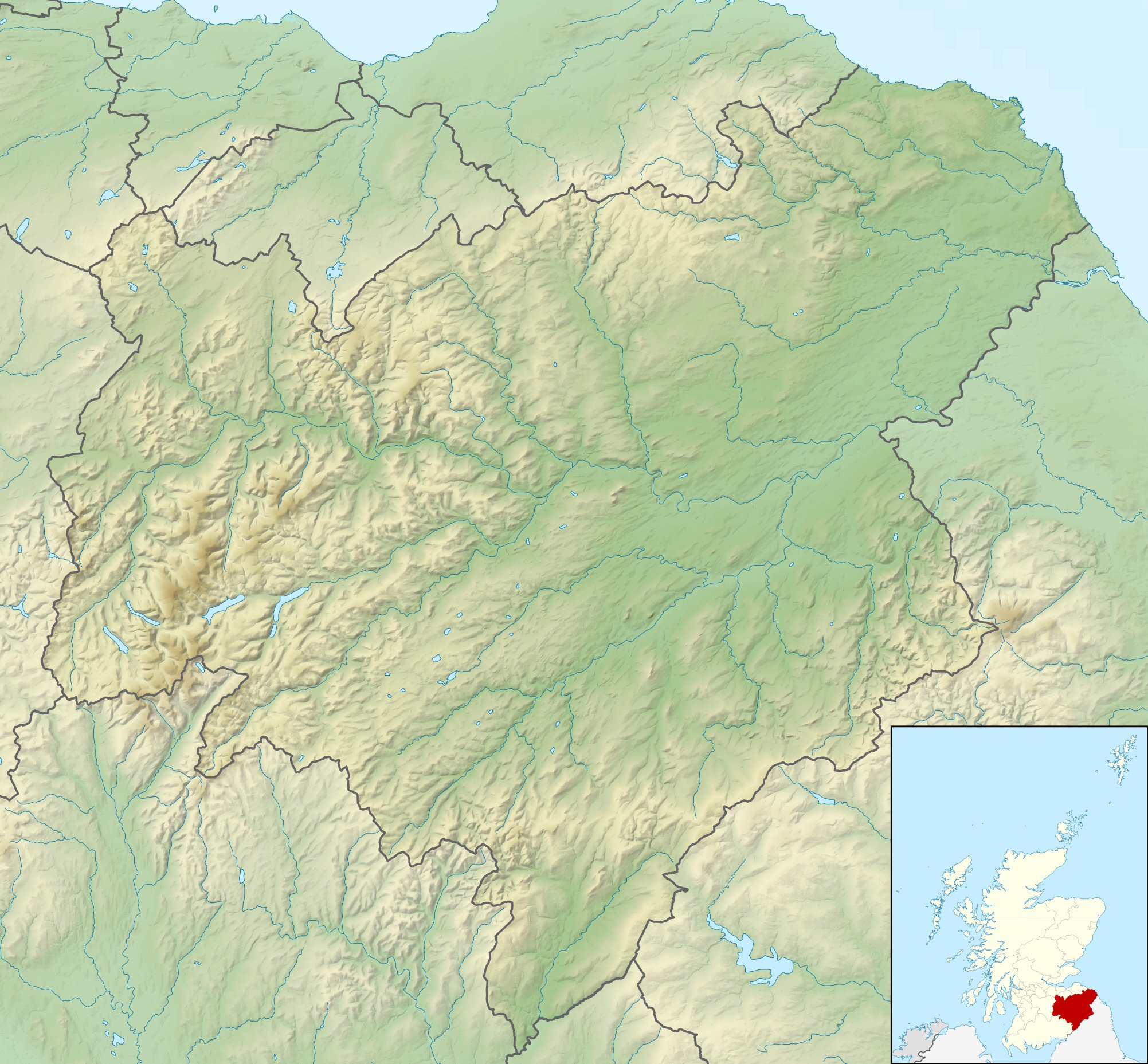
- Location within Scottish Borders
- Location: Scottish Borders
- Coordinates: 55°31′18.9″N 2°27′46.1″W
- Basin countries: Scotland, United Kingdom
- Max. length: 344 m (1,129 ft)
- Max. width: 161.3 m (529 ft)
- Surface elevation: 65 m (213 ft)

Wooden Loch is a lochan (small loch) in the Scottish Borders, at the edge of the village of Eckford.

== Etymology ==
Its name likely derives from an older Scots and English use of the suffix "-en", denoting either the past participle (e.g., brazen) or the plural (e.g., brethren). Hence, a modern translation could be either "Wooded Loch" or "Woods Loch".

== History ==
Until the 19th century, Wooden Loch did not exist and was part of a stretch of wetland known as Wester Moss. When the wetland was drained, forming the loch, locals found the preserved skull of an auroch.
