= Loch Broom (Perth and Kinross) =

Lake in Perth and Kinross, United Kingdom

- Location within Perth and Kinross
- Location: NO009579
- Coordinates: 56.7027°N 3.6185°W
- Type: freshwater loch
- Primary outflows: Lochbroom Burn
- Max. length: 1.2 km (0.75 mi)
- Max. width: 0.4 km (0.25 mi)
- Surface area: 41.6 ha (103 acres)
- Average depth: 1.5 m (5 ft)
- Max. depth: 2.7 m (9 ft)
- Water volume: 532,700 m^{3} (18,813,000 ft^{3})
- Shore length^{1}: 3.2 km (2 mi)
- Surface elevation: 88 m (289 ft)
- Max. temperature: 16 °C (60 °F)
- Min. temperature: 16.0 °C (60.8 °F)
- Islands: 0
- ^{1} Shore length is not a well-defined measure.

Loch Broom is a freshwater trout loch, located in the hills 3 miles (5 kilometres) east of Pitlochry, within Perth and Kinross, Scotland.
