= Loch a' Bhainne =

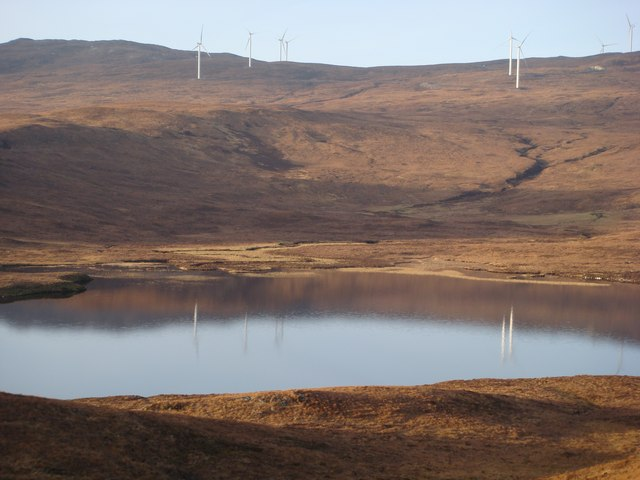

- Location within Highland
- Location: Highland, Scotland
- Coordinates: 57.211700°N 4.713200°W
- Type: freshwater loch
- Primary inflows: Mam a Croisg
- Primary outflows: Allt a' Bhainne
- Basin countries: Scotland
- Max. length: 0.33 mi (0.53 km)
- Max. width: 0.25 mi (0.40 km)
- Surface area: 2.9 ha (7.2 acres)
- Average depth: 10 ft (3.0 m)
- Max. depth: 28 ft (8.5 m)
- Water volume: 14,000,000 ft^{3} (400,000 m^{3})
- Shore length^{1}: 0.6 km (0.37 mi)
- Surface elevation: 308 m (1,010 ft)
- Islands: 0
- ^{1} Shore length is not a well-defined measure.

Loch a' Bhainne is a small, upland freshwater loch approximately 2 miles (3.2 km) north of the east end of Loch Garry and 3.5 miles (5.6 km) north-west of Invergarry in the Scottish Highlands. The loch is roughly triangular in shape with a perimeter of 0.6 km (0.37 mi). It is approximately 0.33 mi (0.53 km) long, has an average depth of 10 ft (3.0 m) and is 28 ft (8.5 m) at its deepest. The loch was surveyed in 1903 by James Murray as part of Sir John Murray's Bathymetrical Survey of Fresh-Water Lochs of Scotland 1897-1909.
