= Cotehill Loch =

- Location within Scotland
- Location: Aberdeenshire, Scotland
- Coordinates: 57.354353°N 1.957262°W
- Type: freshwater loch
- Surface area: 2.7 hectares (6.7 acres)

Cotehill Loch is a freshwater loch located in Scotland in the Aberdeenshire area, approximately one mile (1.5 km) northwest of the coastal town of Collieston and two miles (3 km) north east of the Ythan Estuary. The area the loch covers is 2.7ha. A survey carried out in 2002 by ecologists from the University of Glasgow found that the eutrophication of the water was leading to a "decline in plant species diversity". It was noted in the same study, that the loch's "marginal vegetation" of reedswamp grasses and other plants present around it were still "flourishing". The loch is said to contain three-spined stickleback and perch.
