= Loch na Beinne Baine =

Loch in Highland, Scotland

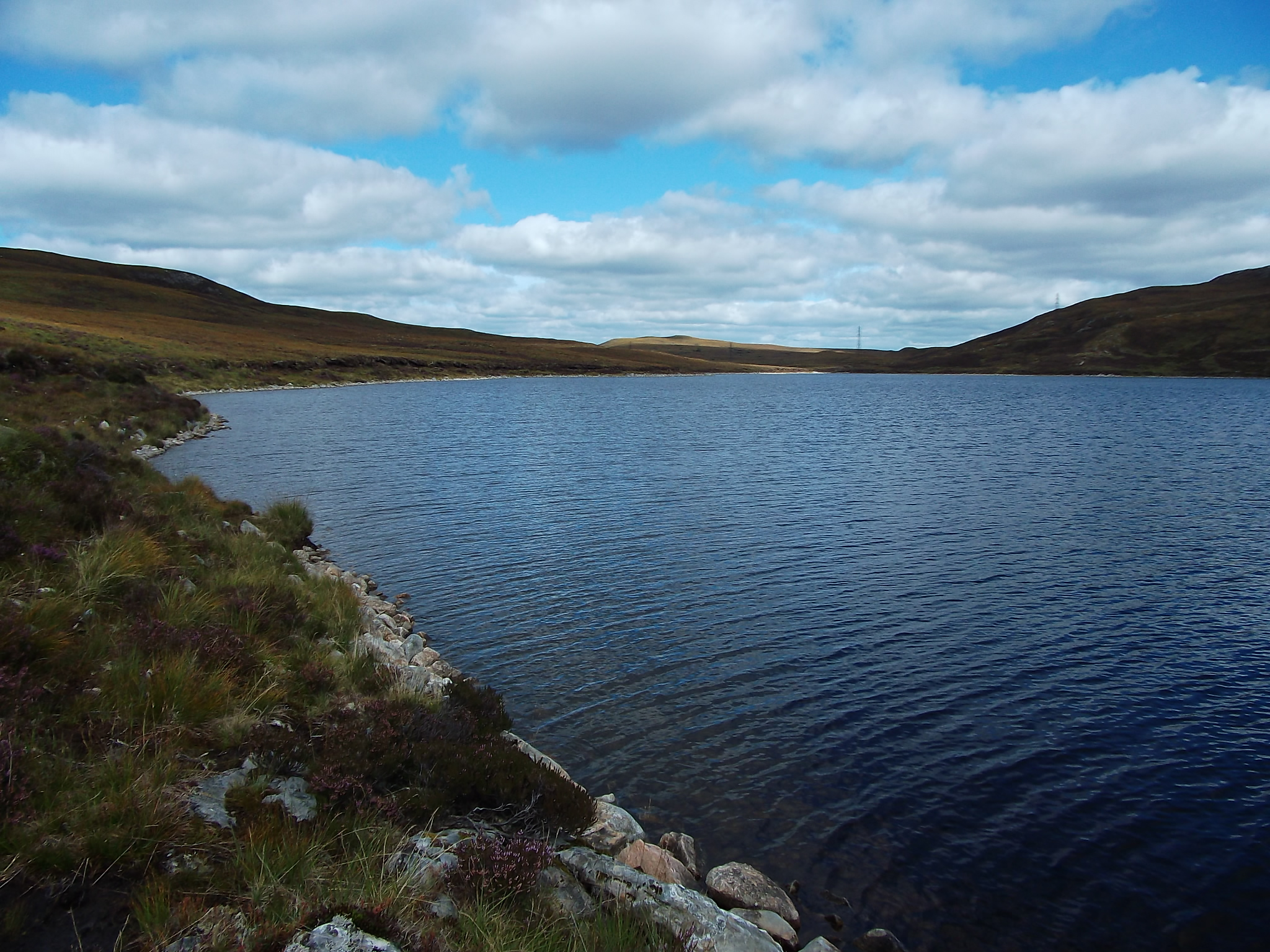
- Loch na Beinne Baine, from its northeast shore

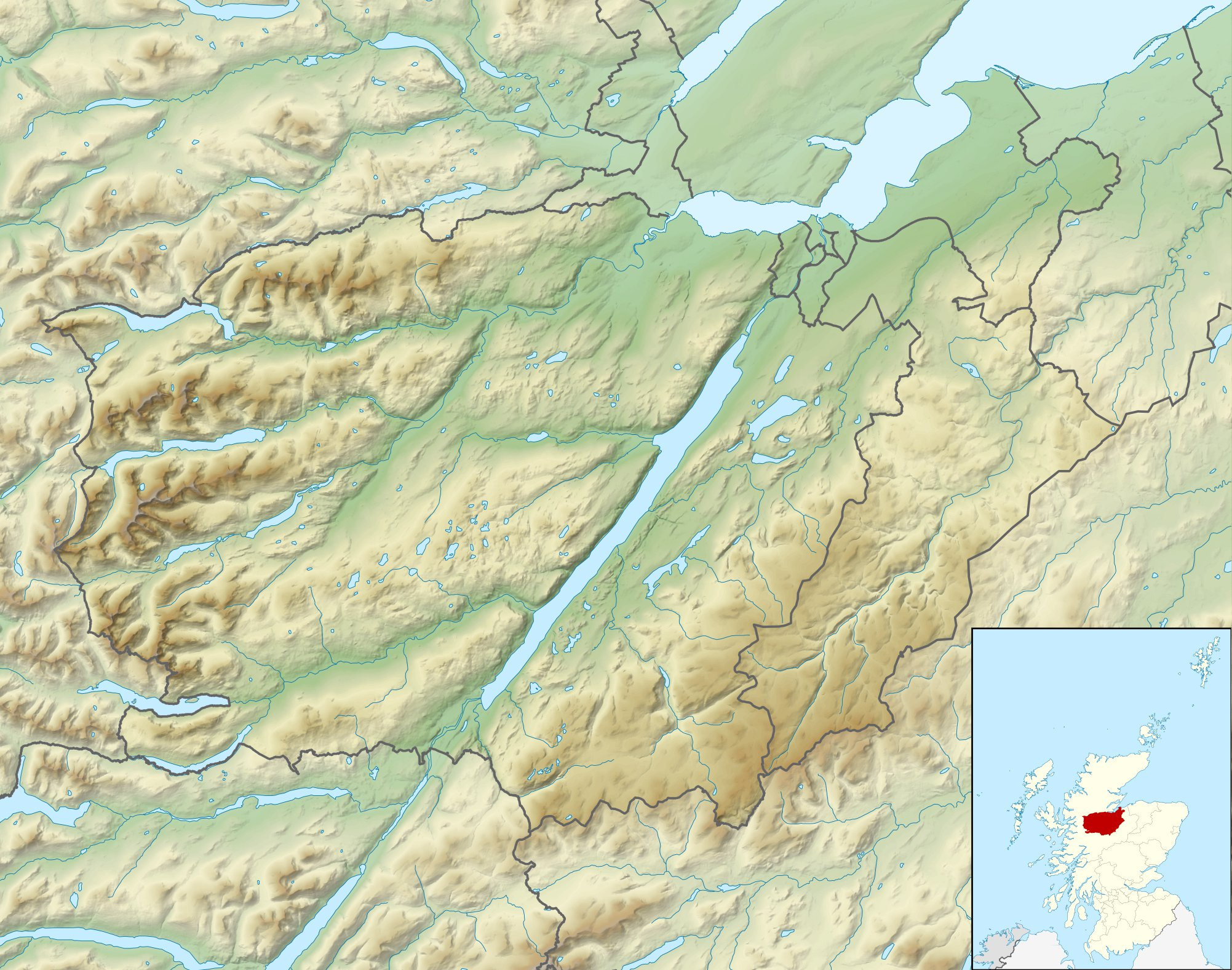
- Location within Inverness area
- Location: Scottish Highlands
- Coordinates: 57°13′53″N 4°50′23″W
- Basin countries: Scotland, United Kingdom
- Max. length: 1.42 km (0.88 mi)
- Max. width: 591 m (1,939 ft)
- Surface elevation: 500 m (1,600 ft)
- Islands: 1

Loch na Beinne Baine is a remote mountain loch on the northern lid of Glenmoriston, Scotland. It sits on the historic boundary between the parishes of Glenmoriston and Strathglass.

Its name means "Loch of the White Mountain" in Scottish Gaelic.

Charles Edward Stuart is recorded as having passed the loch via an "old hill track" in July 1746, during his flight from Culloden.

The loch's waters flow several kilometres downhill via an unnamed burn to meet the River Glass.

The loch has a large stock of brown trout.
