= Loch Poll =

Freshwater loch in Sutherland, Scotland

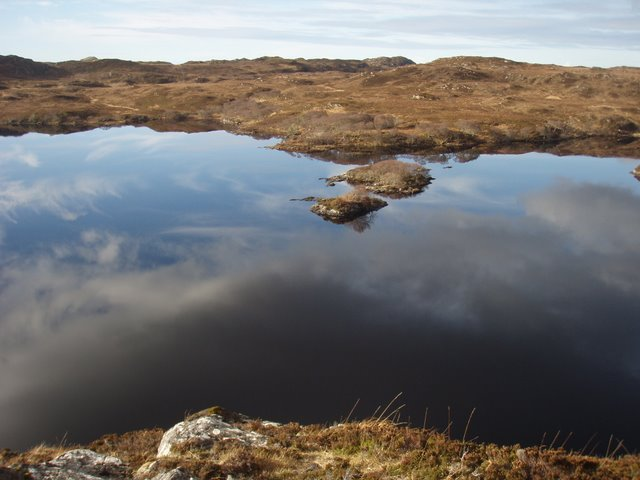
- Loch Poll from its eastern shore

- Location within Sutherland
- Location: Scottish Highlands
- Coordinates: 58°13′21.5″N 5°14′07.7″W
- Primary inflows: Uidh na Tolla Bhaid
- Primary outflows: Oldany River
- Basin countries: Scotland, United Kingdom
- Max. length: 1.92 km (1.19 mi)
- Max. width: 723.6 m (2,374 ft)
- Surface elevation: 50 m (160 ft)
- Islands: 3

Loch Poll is a remote freshwater loch in Sutherland, Scotland, situated roughly 1.5 mi (2.43 km) southwest of the settlement of Drumbeg.

The loch's name derives from the Scottish Gaelic poll, meaning "wet meadow" i.e., "Loch of the Wet Meadow".

Loch Poll has a large stock of fresh trout, and is fished by the Assynt Crofters' Trust.
