= Lochaber Loch =

Lochaber loch
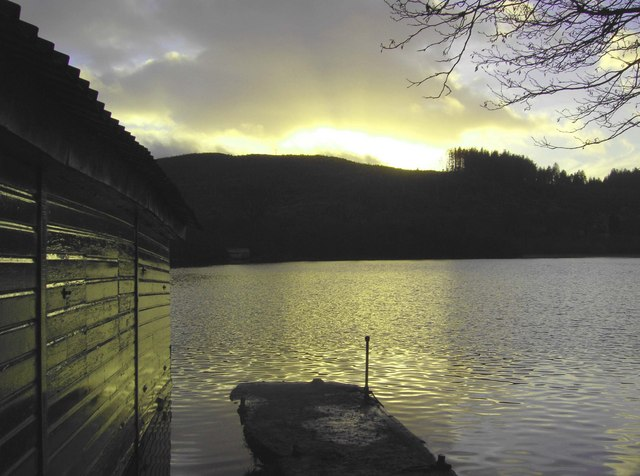
- Lochaber boathouse and jetty

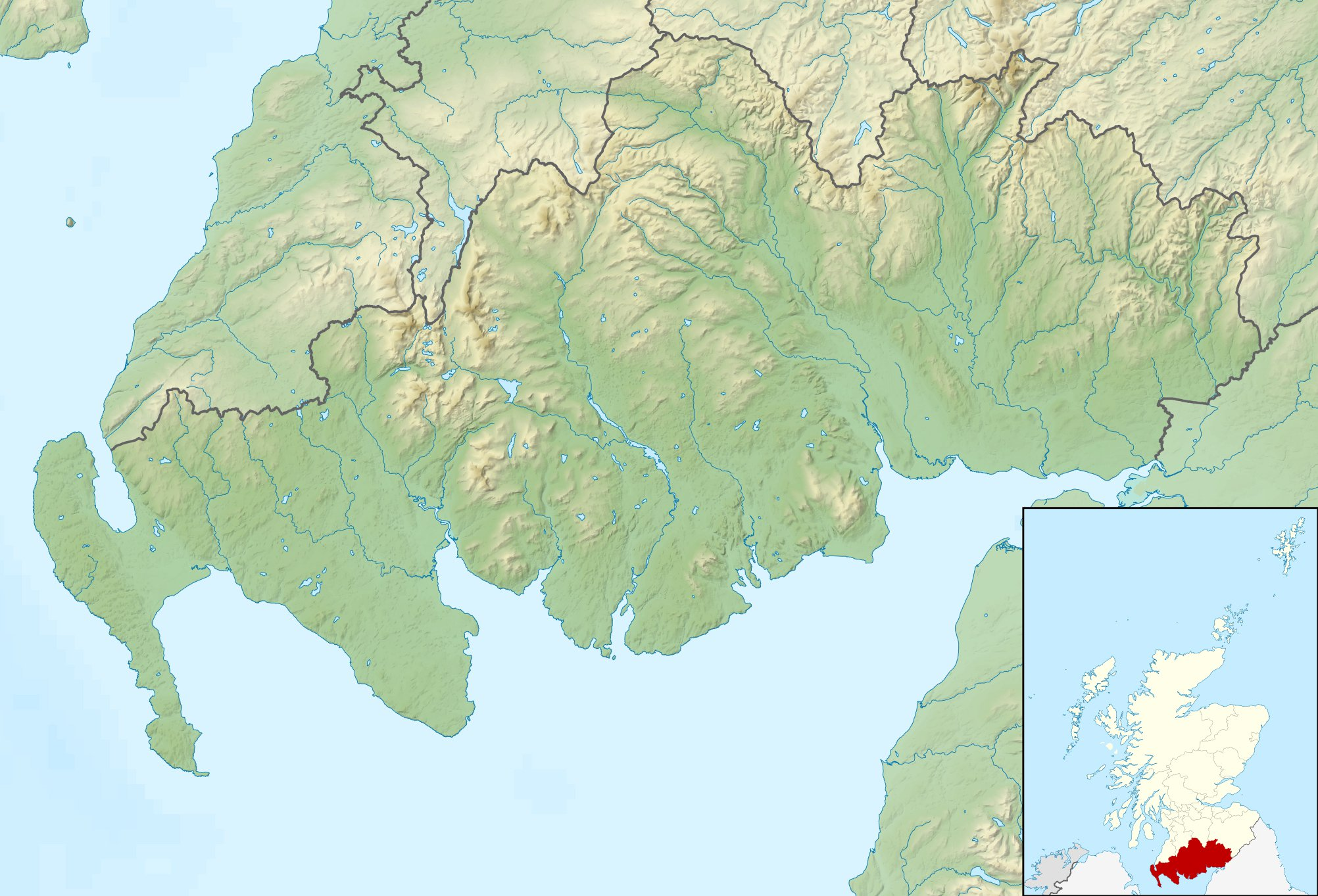
- Location within Dumfries and Galloway
- Location: Dumfries and Galloway, Scotland
- Coordinates: 55.016200°N 3.689200°W
- Type: freshwater loch
- Primary outflows: Kirkgunzeon Lane
- Basin countries: Scotland
- Max. length: 0.5 mi (0.80 km)
- Max. width: 0.25 mi (0.40 km)
- Surface area: 19.9 ha (49 acres)
- Average depth: 20.5 ft (6.2 m)
- Max. depth: 55 ft (17 m)
- Water volume: 47,000,000 ft^{3} (1,300,000 m^{3})
- Shore length^{1}: 2.2 km (1.4 mi)
- Surface elevation: 91 m (299 ft)
- Islands: 0
- ^{1} Shore length is not a well-defined measure.

Lochaber Loch is a small, lowland freshwater loch that lies among steep-sided hills, approximately 4.5 mi (7.2 km) to the west of Dumfries, Scotland. The loch is somewhat triangular in shape and is 0.5 mi (0.80 km) long and 0.25 mi (0.40 km) at its widest point. It has an average depth of 20.5 ft (6.2 m) and is 55 ft (17 m) at its deepest. The loch was surveyed on 4 May 1905 by James Murray and L.W. Collett as part of Sir John Murray's Bathymetrical Survey of Fresh-Water Lochs of Scotland 1897-1909.

Swans, great crested grebes and ospreys can be seen on the loch. There is a bird hide on the water's edge.

The loch in the Mabie Forest, which is managed by the Forestry Commission.
