= Loch Brecbowie =

- Location within Scotland
- Location: Ayrshire, Scotland
- Coordinates: 55°14′01″N 4°27′59″W
- Type: loch
- Islands: 4

Loch Brecbowie

Loch Brecbowie is a Scottish loch located in the Ayrshire region, near the town of Girvan.

The small, freshwater loch contains four small islands. It is situated on the western side of Craigbrock Hill.
