= Loch a' Chairn Mòr =

Lake in Highland, Scotland

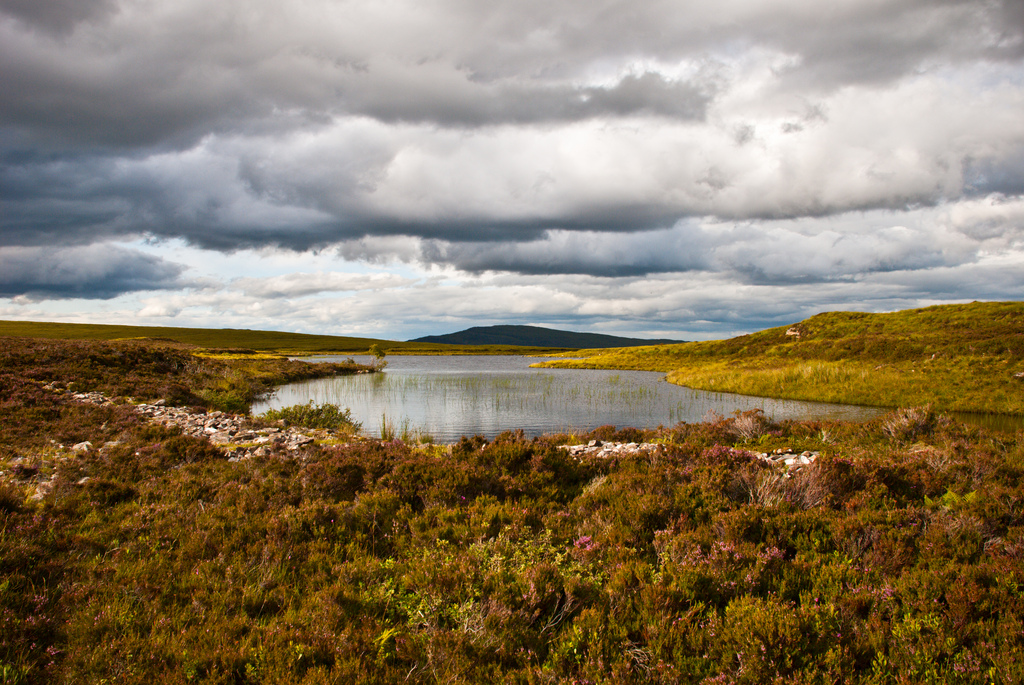
- Loch a' Chairn Mòr, from its south shore

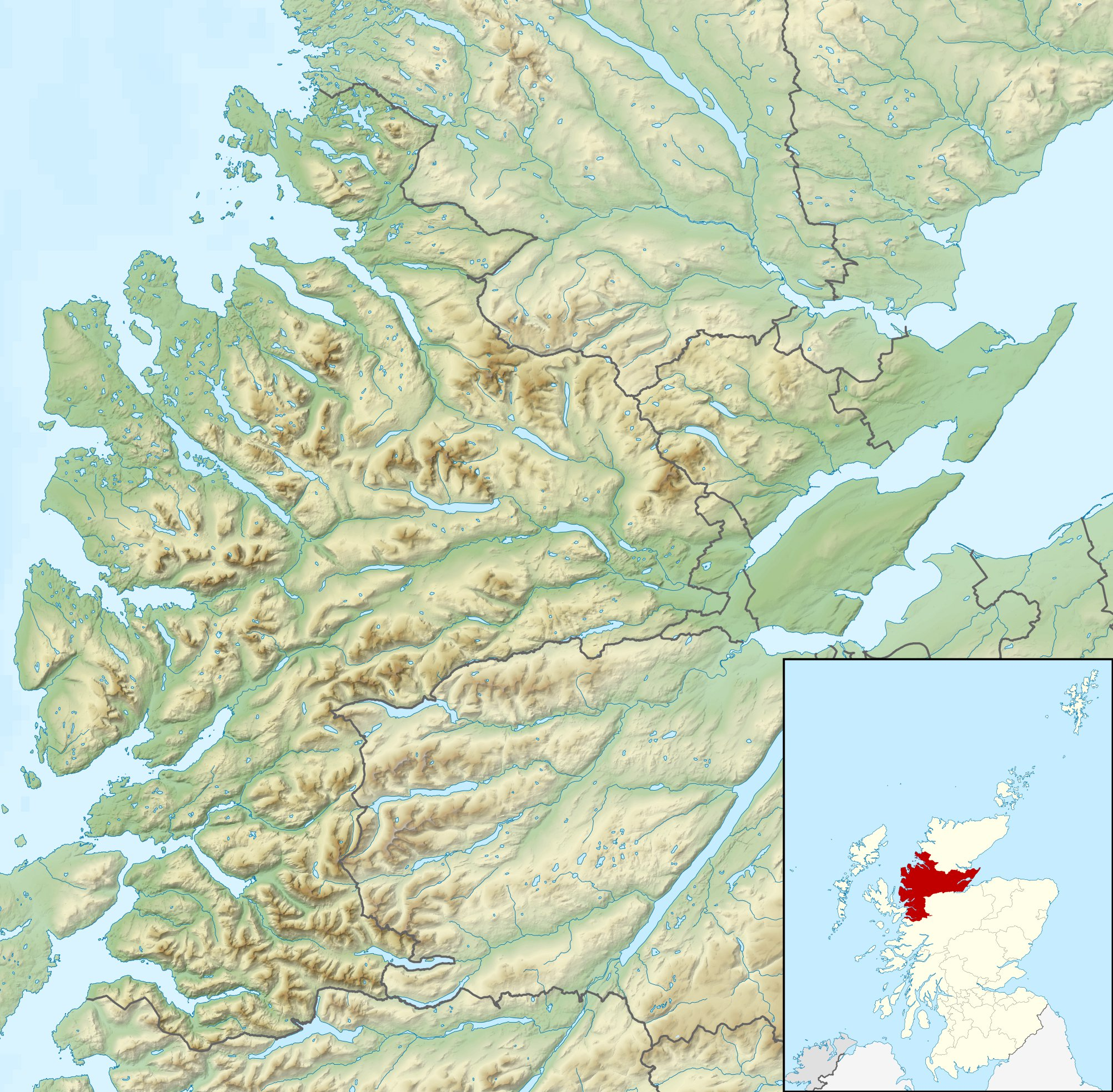
- Location within Ross and Cromarty
- Location: Scottish Highlands
- Coordinates: 57°49′38″N 5°07′16″W
- Primary outflows: Loch a' Chairn Beag
- Basin countries: Scotland, United Kingdom
- Max. length: 553 m (1,814 ft)
- Max. width: 360 m (1,180 ft)
- Surface elevation: 343 m (1,125 ft)
- Islands: 1

Loch a' Chairn Mòr is a remote mountain loch in Wester Ross, Scotland, roughly 2km west of its main outflow, Loch Broom.

Its name translates from Scottish Gaelic to "Loch of the Big Cairn".

Loch a' Chairn Mòr sits in a bed of psammite, surrounded by till.
