= Loch Sealbhanach =

Scottish loch

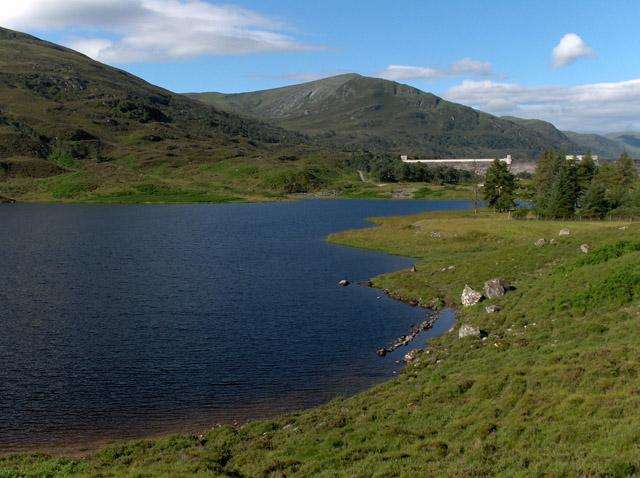
- Loch Sealbhanach from its northern shore

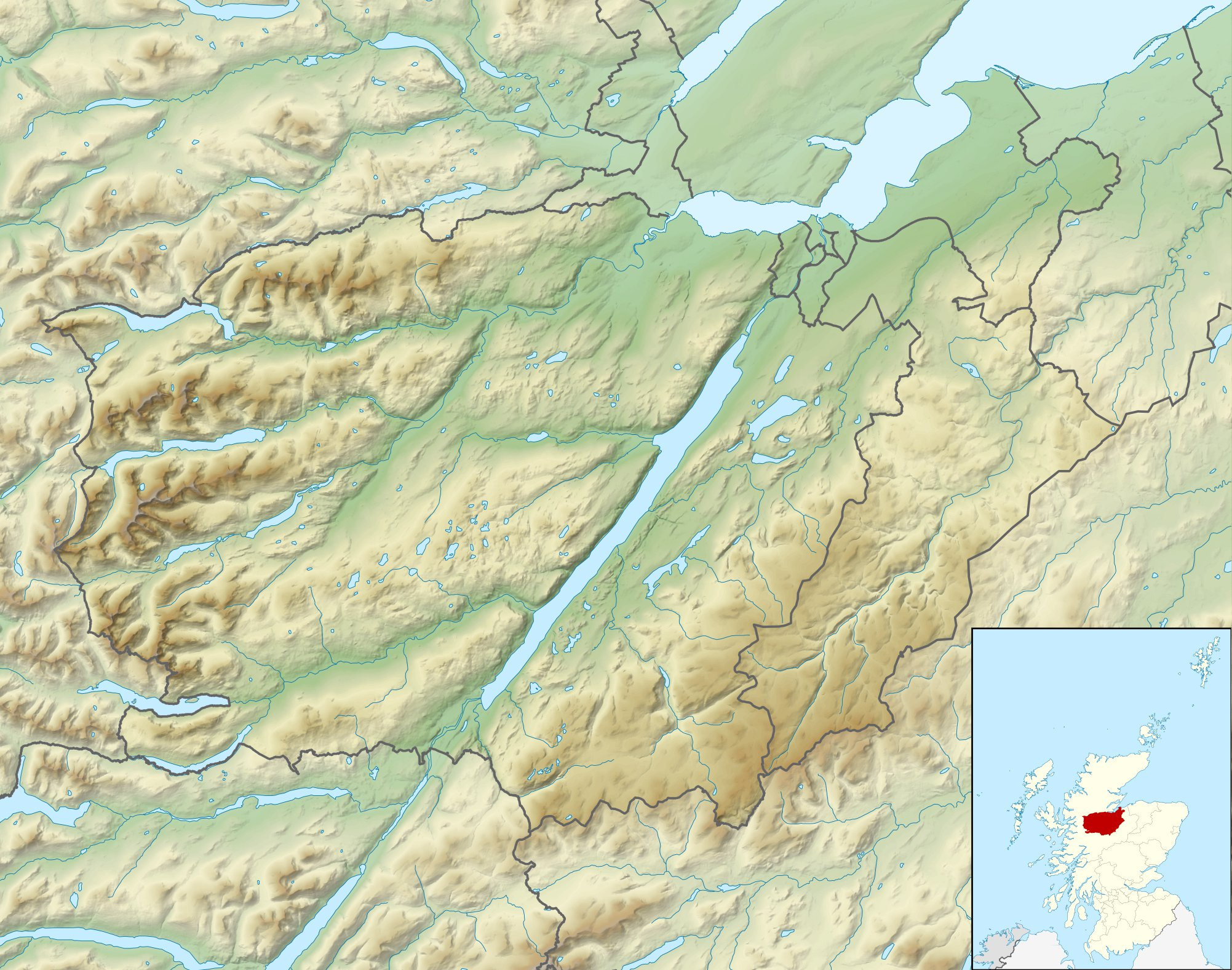
- Location within Inverness area
- Location: Scottish Highlands
- Coordinates: 57.340617°N 4.936995°W
- Primary outflows: River Cannich
- Basin countries: Scotland, United Kingdom
- Max. length: 1.16 km (0.72 mi)
- Max. width: 428.9 m (1,407 ft)
- Surface elevation: 200 m (660 ft)

Loch Sealbhanach is a freshwater loch in Glen Cannich, Scotland.

Sir John Murray recorded the loch as "Loch Sealbhag" in his 1903 survey. This derives from the Scottish Gaelic sealbhag, meaning "sorrel" i.e. "Loch of the Sorrel". The change in name was likely due to a nearby farm named Sealbhanach (recorded by Murray as the Anglicised Shalavanach), meaning "herding-place" i.e. "Loch of the Herding Place". The change appears to have taken place on maps in the 1900s.

Mullardoch Cottage and Mullardoch House, part of Benula Sporting Estate, sit on the loch's western shore.
