= Loch Howie =

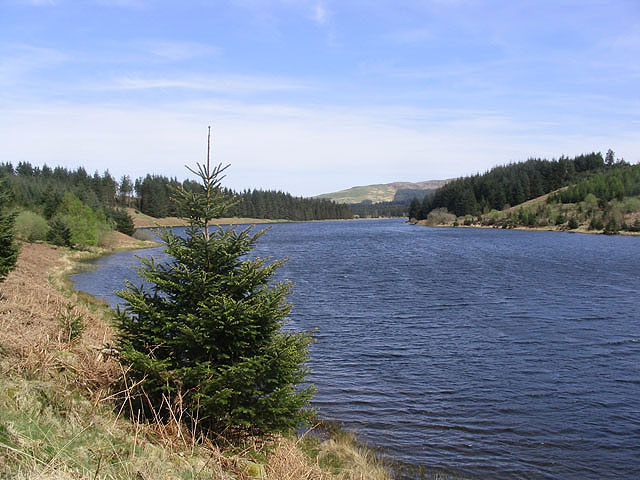

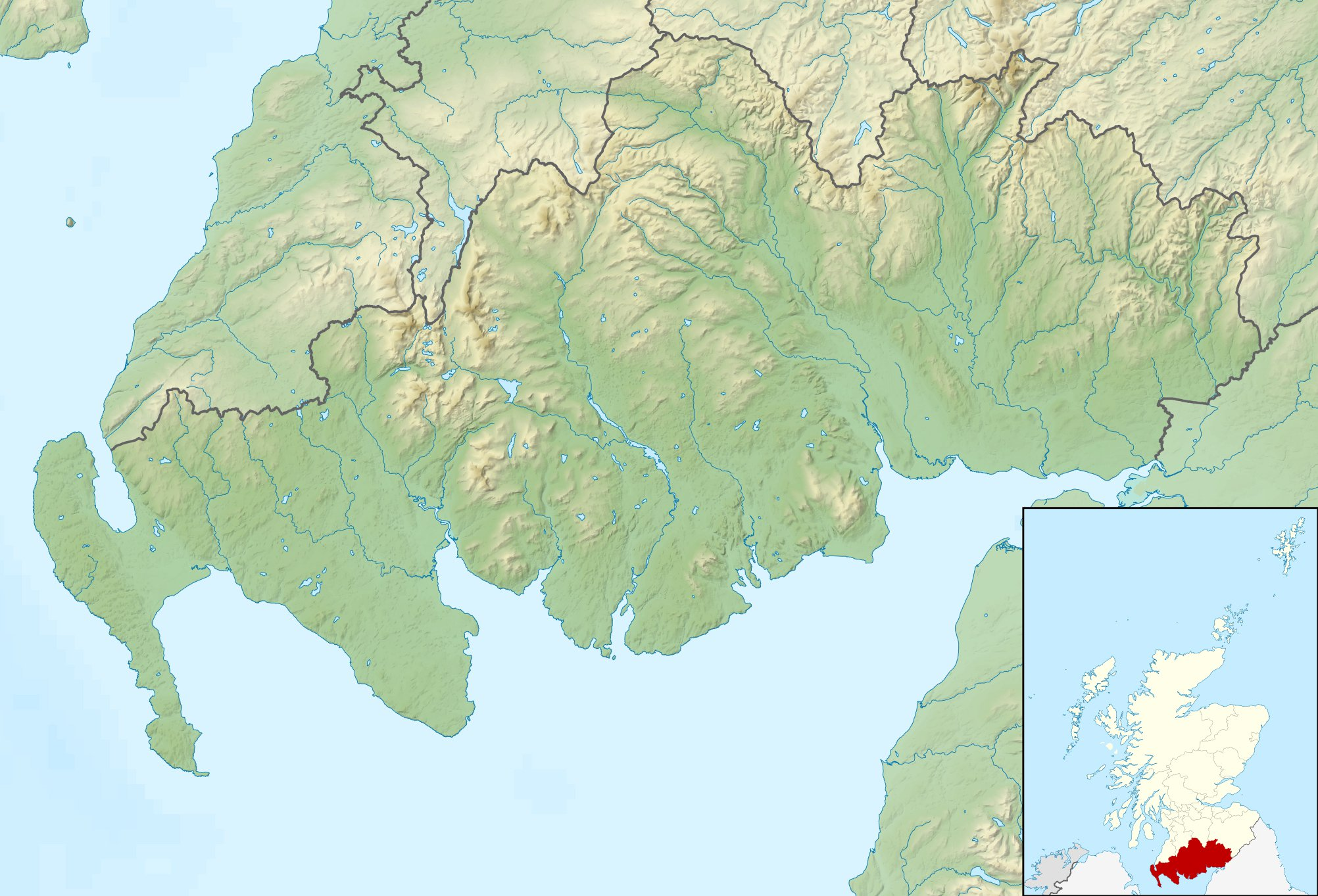
- Location within Dumfries and Galloway
- Location: Dumfries and Galloway, Scotland
- Coordinates: 55.128100°N 4.045800°W
- Type: freshwater loch
- Primary outflows: Mid Burn
- Basin countries: Scotland
- Max. length: 0.75 mi (1.21 km)
- Max. width: 0.125 mi (0.201 km)
- Surface area: 17.7 ha (44 acres)
- Average depth: 16 ft (4.9 m)
- Max. depth: 31 ft (9.4 m)
- Water volume: 31,000,000 ft^{3} (880,000 m^{3})
- Shore length^{1}: 2.6 km (1.6 mi)
- Surface elevation: 233 m (764 ft)
- Islands: 0
- ^{1} Shore length is not a well-defined measure.

Loch Howie is a small, narrow, upland freshwater loch on the north side of Blackcraig Hill, approximately 18 miles (29 km) west of Dumfries, Scotland. The loch trends from south-west to north-east and is 0.75 mi (1.21 km) long by approximately 0.25 mi (0.40 km) at its widest point. It has an average depth of 16 ft (4.9 m) and is 39 ft (12 m) at its deepest. The loch was surveyed on 23 July 1903 by James Murray as part of Sir John Murray's Bathymetrical Survey of Fresh-Water Lochs of Scotland 1897-1909.

The loch is popular for fishing and is populated with perch, pike and roach.
