= Perthshire =

Historic administrative division in Scotland

Coordinates: 56°30′N 4°00′W

- Historic county
- Perthshire within Scotland
- Area
  - 1975: 2,528 sq mi (6,550 km^{2}) (5th)
- History
  - Succeeded by: Tayside Region
- Status: Local government county (until 1975); Land registration county (1868–)
- Chapman code: PER
- Government
  - HQ: Perth (county town and administrative centre)
  - Motto: Pro Lege et Libertate ('For Law and Liberty')
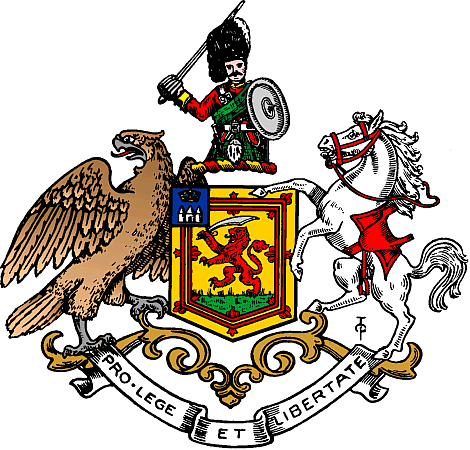
- Coat of arms of the county council

Perthshire, (Note: locally: [ˈpʰɛɻθʃəɻ]; Scottish Gaelic: Siorrachd Pheairt)) or the County of Perth, is a historic county and registration county in central Scotland.

Geographically Perthshire extends from Strathmore in the east, to the Pass of Drumochter in the north, Rannoch Moor and Ben Lui in the west, and Aberfoyle in the south; it borders the counties of Inverness-shire and Aberdeenshire (historic) to the north, Angus to the east, Fife, Kinross-shire, Clackmannanshire, Stirlingshire and Dunbartonshire to the south and Argyllshire to the west.

Prominent settlements include the city of Perth, the county town, as well as smaller towns such as Auchterarder, Blairgowrie and Rattray, Crieff, Dunblane and Scone. Perthshire is known as the "big county", or "the Shire", due to its roundness and status as the fourth largest historic county in Scotland. It has a wide variety of landscapes, from the rich agricultural straths in the east, to the high mountains of the southern Highlands.

Perthshire was formerly an administrative county until being combined in 1930 with neighbouring Kinross-shire under a joint county council, prior to the administrative counties being abolished in 1975. Today, much of the two counties forms part of the Perth and Kinross council area.

== History ==
=== Administrative history ===
Perthshire's origins as a shire (the area administered by a sheriff) are obscure, but it seems to have been created during the reign of David I (reigned 1124–1153).

The Sheriff of Perth had authority over several provinces, including Atholl, Breadalbane, Gowrie, Menteith and Strathearn. Over time, Scotland's shires became more significant than the old provinces, with more administrative functions being given to the sheriffs. In 1667 Commissioners of Supply were established for each shire, which would serve as the main administrative body for the area until the creation of county councils in 1890. Following the Acts of Union in 1707, the English term "county" came to be used interchangeably with the older term "shire".

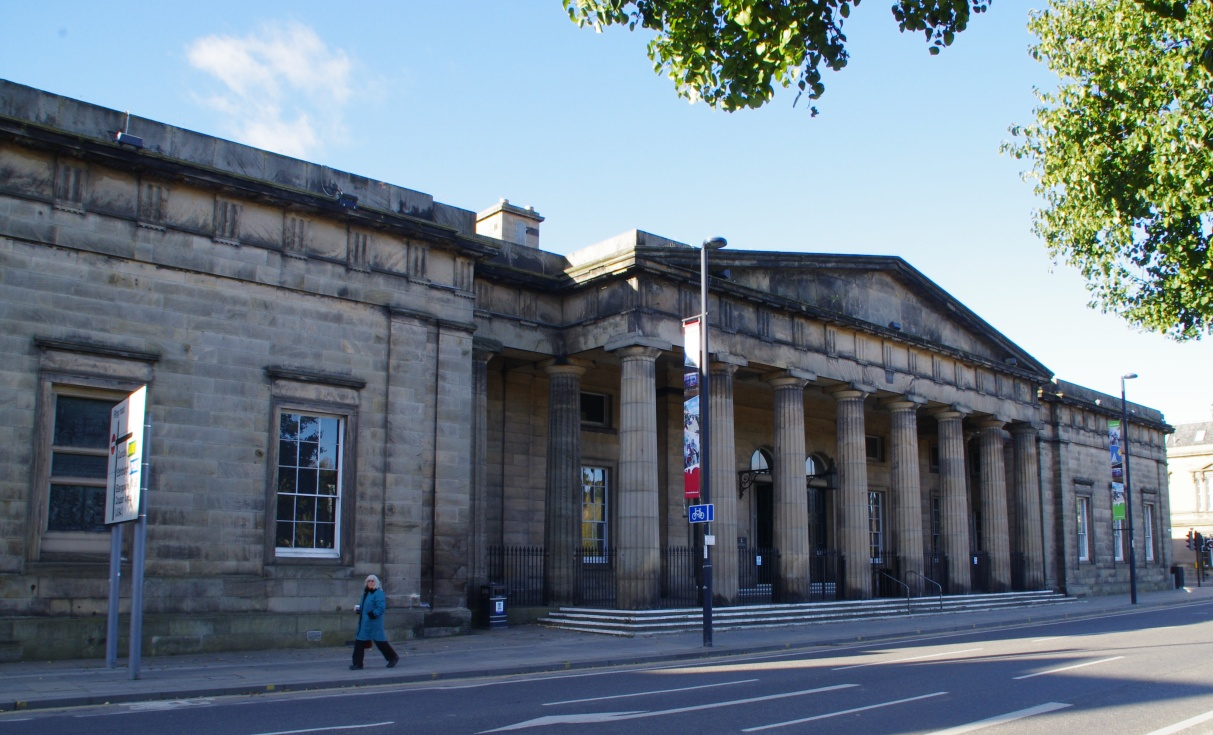
Perth Sheriff Court: County council's meeting place 1890–1930

Elected county councils were established in 1890 under the Local Government (Scotland) Act 1889, taking most of the functions of the commissioners (which were eventually abolished in 1930). The burgh of Perth was deemed capable of managing its own affairs and so was excluded from the administrative area of the county council, although the county council still chose to base itself there. Perthshire County Council held its first official meeting on 22 May 1890 at Perth Sheriff Court, then also known as County Buildings, the courthouse (built 1819) which also served as the meeting place for the commissioners.

The 1889 Act also led to a review of boundaries, with exclaves being transferred to a county they actually bordered, and parishes which straddled more than one county being adjusted such that each parish was entirely in a single county. There were several such changes affecting the boundaries of Perthshire, notably including the exclaves of Culross and Tulliallan being transferred to Fife.

Reforms in 1930 under the Local Government (Scotland) Act 1929 saw the burgh of Perth brought within the administrative area of the county council, and merged the county councils of Perthshire and the neighbouring small county of Kinross-shire for most purposes. The two county councils continued to be elected as separate bodies, but operated together as the "Perth and Kinross Joint County Council", serving the combined area of the two counties.

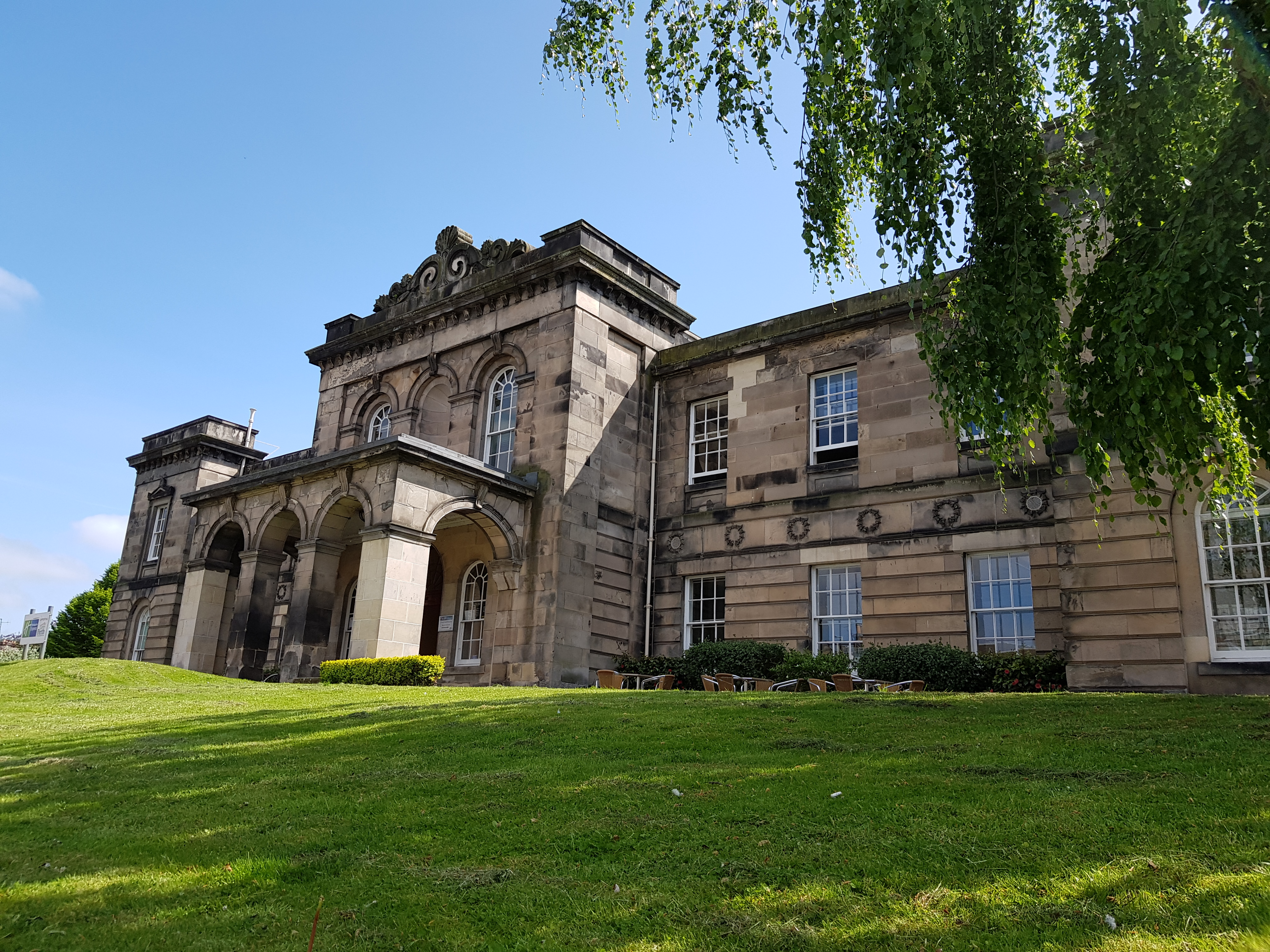
County Offices in York Place, Perth: Headquarters of the Perth and Kinross Joint County Council 1930–1975

As part of the same reforms, the county council took over the functions of the abolished Perthshire Education Authority. The education authority had bought the former County and City Infirmary on York Place in Perth (completed 1838) in 1920 to serve as its headquarters; after 1930 it served as the headquarters of the joint county council, and was renamed County Offices.

Perthshire was abolished as an administrative area in 1975 under the Local Government (Scotland) Act 1973. It was split between the Central and Tayside Regions:

- West Perthshire (the area west and south of Killin including Callander, Crianlarich and Aberfoyle) was included in the Stirling District of the Central Region.
- The parish of Muckhart was made part of Clackmannan District, also in the Central Region.
- Longforgan was included in the City of Dundee District, in the Tayside Region.
- The remainder of Perthshire was combined with Kinross-shire and the Angus parish of Kettins to form the Perth and Kinross District Council in Tayside.

The two-tier system introduced in 1975 was superseded by a system of unitary authorities in 1996. The districts of Tayside and Central Scotland all became unitary authorities, with Longforgan being transferred from Dundee to Perth and Kinross. The majority of historic Perthshire lies in Perth and Kinross. The exceptions are the southwestern part that is now in the Stirling council area and a few parishes that are now in Clackmannanshire. Perth and Kinross also contains some areas that were not historically in Perthshire, such as Kinross-shire. The lieutenancy areas in the area of historic Perthshire are mostly coterminous with the council areas, the exception being that the Stirling council area forms part of a larger Stirling and Falkirk lieutenancy. The boundaries of the historic county of Perthshire are still used for some limited official purposes connected with land registration, being a registration county.

=== Coat of arms ===
The coat of arms of the County of Perth appears to have been granted for use on the colours and standards of the volunteer and militia units of the county raised at the end of the eighteenth century. The Earl of Kinnoull, a native of Perthshire, and commanding officer of the Perthshire Gentlemen and Yeomanry Cavalry, was also Lord Lyon King of Arms at the time, and he presented the arms to the county in 1800. The grant document was discovered in the Lyon Office in 1890, and forwarded to the newly formed Perth County Council.

The shield is very similar to the Scottish royal arms, reflecting that Perthshire was the home county of the House of Dunkeld and contains the former royal capital, Scone. Further royal references are made on the canton, which shows Scone Palace surmounted by the Crown of Scotland. The crest is a Highland soldier, reflecting that the famous Black Watch were formed in the county. The supporters are an eagle and a warhorse, the former from the arms of the city of Perth.

=== Burghs ===
By the 1890s the county contained the following burghs, which were largely outside the county council's jurisdiction:

- Royal Burgh of Perth (which was styled a city)
- Burgh of Auchterarder (formed 1894: reinstated as a royal burgh in 1951)
- Burgh of Aberfeldy (police burgh from 1887)
- Burgh of Abernethy (burgh of barony from 1458/9, police burgh from 1877)
- Burgh of Alyth (burgh of barony from 1488, police burgh from 1834)
- Burgh of Blairgowrie (burgh of barony 1634, police burgh 1833)
- Burgh of Rattray (police burgh 1873)
- Burgh of Callander (police burgh 1866)
- Burgh of Coupar Angus (burgh of barony 1607, police burgh 1852)
- Burgh of Crieff (burgh of barony 1674, burgh of regality 1687, police burgh 1864)
- Burgh of Doune (burgh of barony 1611, police burgh 1890)
- Burgh of Dunblane (burgh of regality of the Bishop of Dunblane 1442, police burgh 1870)

The Local Government (Scotland) Act 1929 divided burghs into two classes from 1930: large burghs, which were to gain extra powers from the county council, and small burghs which lost many of their responsibilities.

Of the twelve burghs in Perthshire, only Perth was made a large burgh. There were ten small burghs: Blairgowrie and Rattray being united into a single burgh. In 1947 Pitlochry was created a small burgh.

=== Civil parishes ===
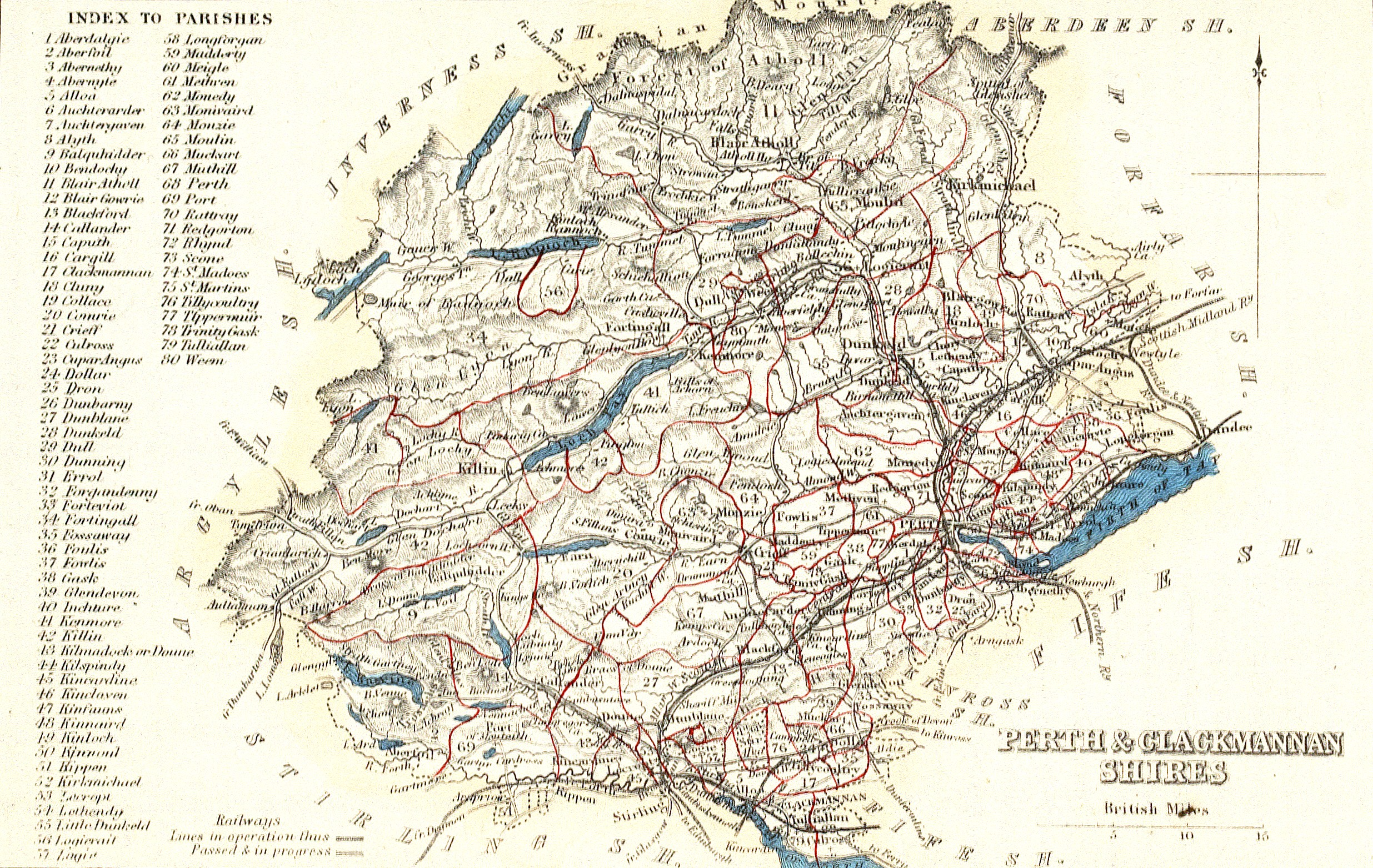
Perthshire and Clackmannanshire c. 1851. Parishes outlined in red

In 1894 parish councils were established for the civil parishes, replacing the previous parochial boards. The parish councils were in turn replaced by district councils in 1930.

Following the boundary changes caused by the Local Government (Scotland) Act 1889, the county contained the following civil parishes:

- Aberdaugie
- Aberfeldy
- Aberfoyle
- Abernethy
- Abernyte
- Alyth
- Ardoch
- Arngask
- Auchterarder
- Auchtergaven Moneydie
- Balquhidder
- Bankfoot
- Bendochy
- Blackford
- Blair Atholl
- Blairgowrie and Rattray
- Blairmacgregor
- Callander
- Caputh
- Cargill
- Clunie
- Collace
- Comrie
- Coupar Angus
- Crieff
- Dowally
- Dron
- Dull
- Dunbarney
- Dunblane and Lecropt
- Dunkeld and Dowally
- Dunning
- Errol
- Findo Gask
- Forgandenny
- Forteviot
- Fortingall
- Foss or Fossoway or Crook of Devon
- Fowlis Easter
- Fowlis Wester
- Glendevon
- Glen Shee
- Inchture
- Innerwick
- Killin
- Kilmadock
- Kilspindie
- Kincardine
- Kinclaven
- Kinfauns Kinfauns Castle
- Kinloch
- Kinnaird, Gowrie
- Kinnoull
- Kirkmichael
- Lethendy
- Little Dunkeld
- Logiealmond
- Logierait
- Longforgan
- Madderty
- Meigle
- Methven
- Moneydie and Auchtergaven
- Monzie or *Monzievaird and Strowan
- Moulin
- Muckhart
- Muthill
- Persie
- Perth
- Port of Menteith
- Blairgowrie and Rattray
- Redgorton
- Rhynd
- St Madoes
- St Martins
- Scone
- Stanley
- Strathfillian
- Strathloch
- Tenandry
- Tibbermore
- Trinity Gask
- Tullybelton
- Weem

=== Districts ===
In 1930 the landward area of the Local Government councils (the part outside of burgh boundaries) was divided into five districts, replacing the parish councils established in 1894:

- Central District
- Eastern District
- Highland District
- Perth District
- Western District

== Language ==
Perthshire historically straddled the "Highland line" separating the English-speaking and Gaelic-speaking parts of Scotland. Until the 19th century it was linguistically divided between the "mountainous, sparsely-populated and largely Gaelic-speaking parishes to the north and west and predominantly arable, densely-settled, and chiefly English-speaking parishes to the south and east".

Linguistic data for Perthshire is limited before the 17th century. Based on James Kirkwood's assessment of Highland parishes for his Scottish Gaelic Bible project, it has been estimated that around 45 percent of Perthshire spoke Gaelic in 1698. The decline in the use of Gaelic accelerated rapidly in the early 19th century. In the 1881 United Kingdom census, the first to count Scottish Gaelic speakers, Gaelic was recorded as spoken "habitually" by 12.1 percent of Perthshire residents. This had declined to 1.7 percent by the 1971 census.

Perthshire Gaelic has existed as a distinct dialect since at least the 16th century, when the Book of the Dean of Lismore was published. Lady Evelyn Stewart Murray compiled Perthshire Gaelic folk tales and songs in the late 19th century, a collection now held by the School of Scottish Studies. Alexandra Stewart of Glen Lyon, a reputed direct descendant of Allan Breck Stewart was obituarised in 1991 as the "last surviving native speaker of Perthshire Gaelic", although this status was uncertain. In the 20th century, a revival of Scottish Gaelic in Perthshire was led by Elizabeth McDiarmid.

== Geography ==
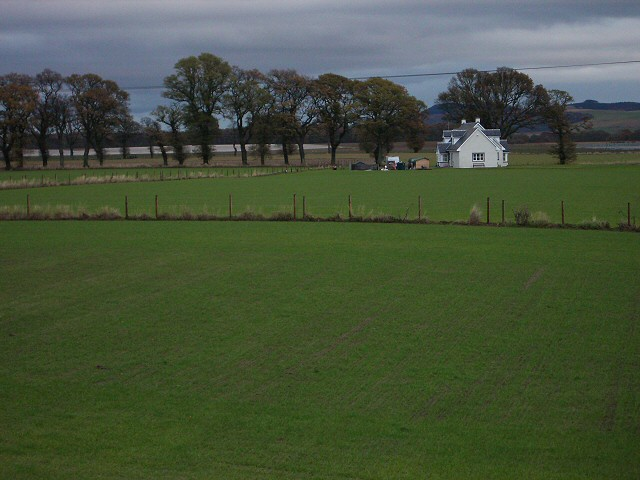
The uncharacteristically flat lands of the Carse of Gowrie

The county forms part of the Highland geographic area; it consists of predominantly mountainous and hilly land within the Grampian Mountains, interspersed with numerous lochs and glens. The highest point is Ben Lawers at 1,214 m (3,983 ft), making it the 10th highest peak in Scotland. Most towns are fairly small, with the larger ones being clustered in the flatter south-east of the county. In the far south along the borders with Clackmannanshire and Kinross-shire lie the Ochil Hills, and in the south-east part of the Sidlaw Hills lie within the county, continuing on into Angus. Perthshire borders the Firth of Tay in the south-east, which provides access to the North Sea; along the north shore lies the Carse of Gowrie, an extremely flat area of land given over to agriculture. Within the Forth can be found the small island of Mugdrum.

=== Rivers ===
- River Ardle
- River Earn
- River Ericht
- River Farg
- River Forth
- River Garry
- River Isla
- River Tay
- River Teith
- River Tummel

=== Lochs and Reservoirs ===
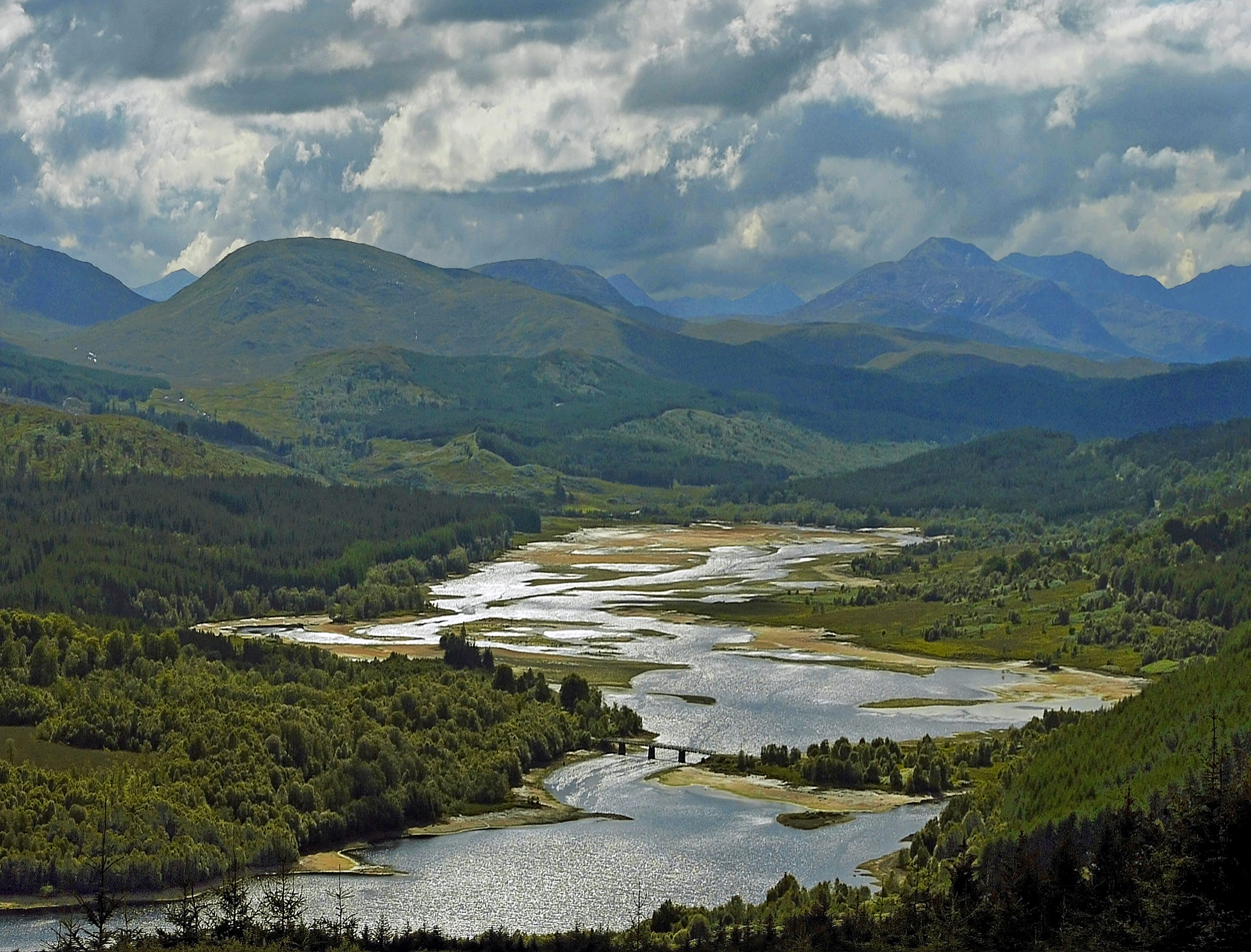
Typical Perthshire scenery around Loch Garry

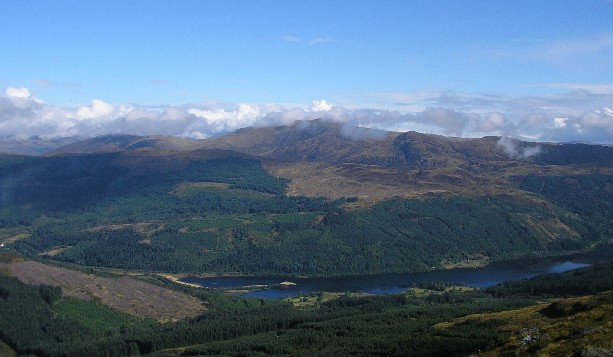
Ben Vorlich rising above Loch Lubnaig

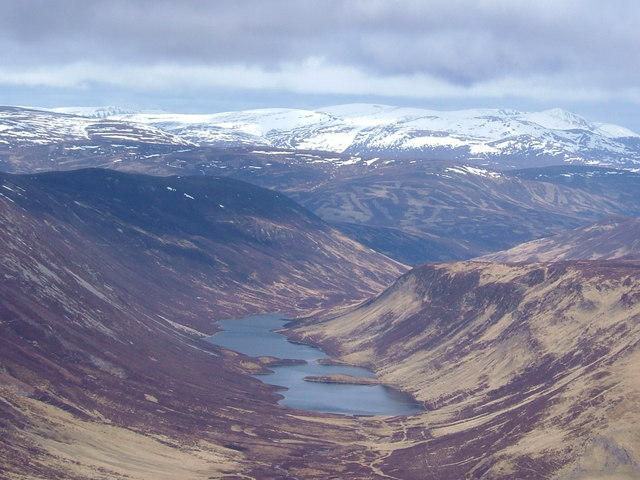
Loch Loch from summit of Ben Vuirich

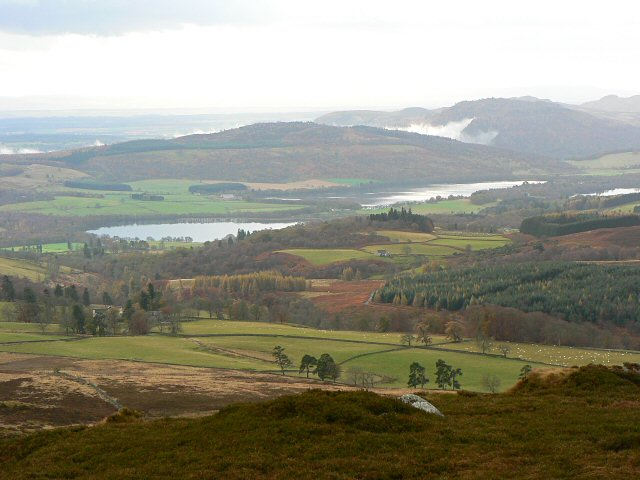
The Loch of Butterstone as seen from Benachally Monument

- Cally Loch
- Carsebreck Loch
- Castlehill Reservoir
- Cocksburn Reservoir (shared with Stirlingshire)
- Dowally Loch
- Drumore Loch
- Dubh Lochan
- Dupplin Loch
- Fingask Loch
- Glas Finglas Reservoir
- Glenfarg Reservoir (shared with Kinross-shire)
- Glenquey Resrvoir
- Glensherup Reservoir
- Laird's Loch
- Lake of Menteith
- Little Loch Skiach
- Loch Achray
- Loch an Daimh
- Loch an Duin
- Loch Ard
- Loch Beanie
- Loch Benachally
- Loch Bollachan
- Loch Broom
- Loch Chon
- Loch Con
- Loch Crannach
- Loch Creagh
- Loch Curran
- Loch Derculich
- Loch Dhu
- Loch Doine
- Loch Drunkie
- Loch Earn
- Loch Eigeach
- Loch Ericht (shared with Inverness-shire)
- Loch Errochty
- Loch Essan
- Loch Farleyer
- Loch Fender
- Loch Finnart
- Loch Freuchie
- Loch Garry
- Loch Glassie
- Loch Hoil
- Loch Iubhair
- Loch Katrine (shared with Dunbartonshire)
- Loch Kennard
- Loch Kinardochy
- Loch Laddon (shared with Argyllshire)
- Loch Laggan
- Loch Lednock Reservoir
- Loch Loch
- Loch Lubnaig
- Loch Lyon
- Loch Macanrie
- Loch Maragan
- Loch Mhairc
- Loch Monaghan
- Loch Monzievaird
- Loch na Bà
- Loch na Brae
- Loch nan Eun
- Loch of Belloch
- Loch of Butterstone
- Loch of Clunie
- Loch of Craiglush
- Loch of Drumellie
- Loch of Lowes
- Loch Ordie
- Loch Oss
- Loch Rannoch
- Loch Rusky
- Loch Scoly
- Loch Skiach
- Loch Tay
- Loch Tilt
- Loch Tinker
- Loch Tummel
- Loch Turret Reservoir
- Loch Valigan
- Loch Venachar
- Loch Voil
- Loch Watston
- Lochan a' Chait
- Lochan a' Mhàidseir
- Loch Balloch
- Lochan Caol Fada
- Lochan Coire na Mèinne
- Lochan Creag a' Mhadaidh
- Lochan Ghiubhais
- Lochan Lairig Laoigh
- Lochan Lòin nan Donnlaich
- Lochan Mhàim nan Carn
- Lochan Mon' an Fhiadhain
- Lochan na Beinne
- Lochan na Làirige
- Lochan nam Breac
- Lohan nan Cat
- Lochan Oisinneach
- Lochan Oisinneach Mòr
- Lochan Ruighe nan-Sligean
- Lochan Spling
- Lochan Sròn Smeur
- Lochan Uaine
- Lossburn Reservoir
- Lower Glendevon Reservoir
- Lower Rhynd
- Methven Loch
- Mill Dam
- Monk Myre
- Pitcairnie Loch
- Pitcarmick Loch
- Pond of Drummond
- Rae Loch
- Redmyre Loch
- Rotmell Loch
- Seamaw Loch
- Stronuich Reservoir
- Stormont Loch
- Upper Glendevon Reservoir (shared with Clackmannanshire)
- Upper Rhynd
- Waltersmuir Reservoir
- White Loch
- White Moss Loch

=== Mountains ===
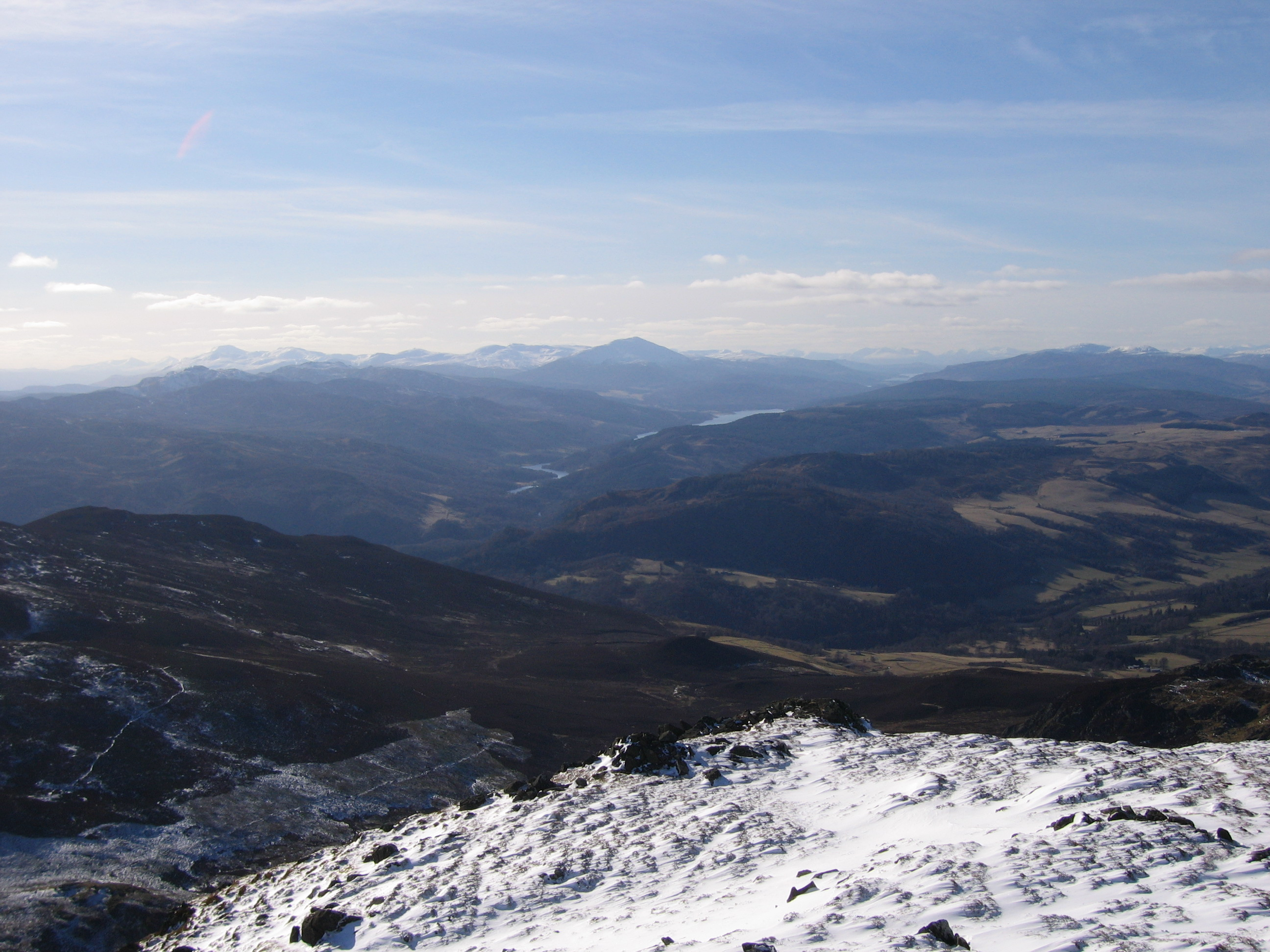
Ben Vrackie: View west to the Lawers range, Schiehallion, lochs Tummel and Rannoch, and very distant Glen Coe peaks

- Ben Lawers
- Ben Vorlich
- Ben Mhor
- Ben Vrackie
- Beinn a' Ghlò
- Schiehallion

=== Glens and straths ===
- Glen Almond
- Glen Isla
- Glen Shee
- Glen Garry
- Glen Tilt
- Glen Bruar
- Glen Fincastle
- Glen Errochty
- Glen Rannoch
- Glen Lyon
- Glen Lochay
- Glen Dochart
- Strathmore
- Strath Ardle
- Strath Braan
- Strath Tay
- Strath Tummel
- Strath Fillan
- Strath Earn

== Settlements ==
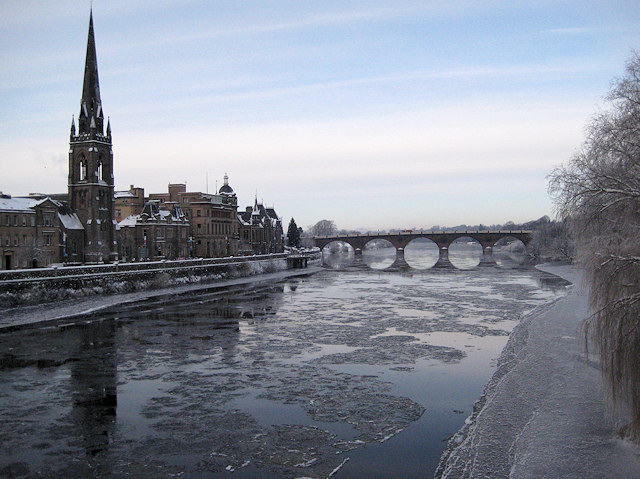
The River Tay at Perth

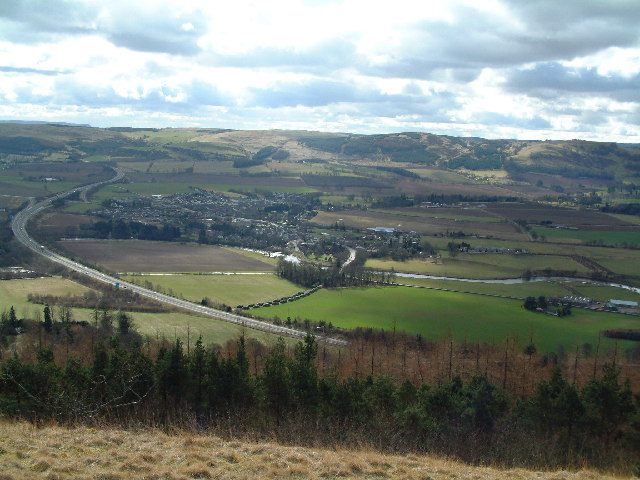
Bridge of Earn from Moncreiffe Hill

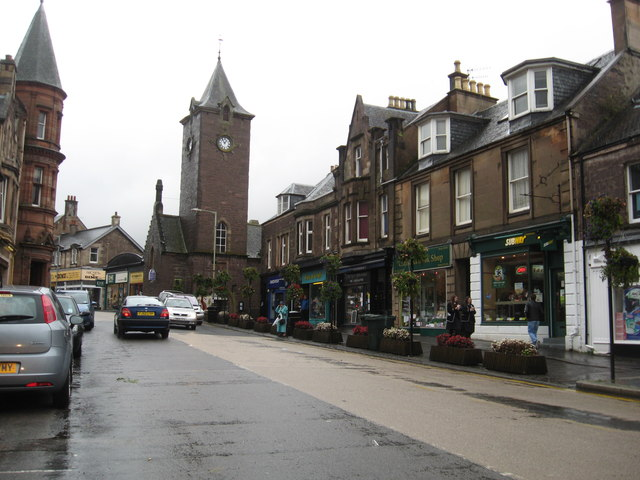
Crieff

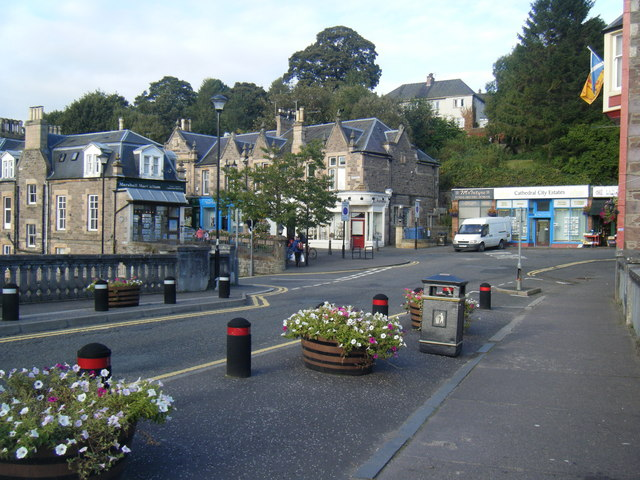
Dunblane

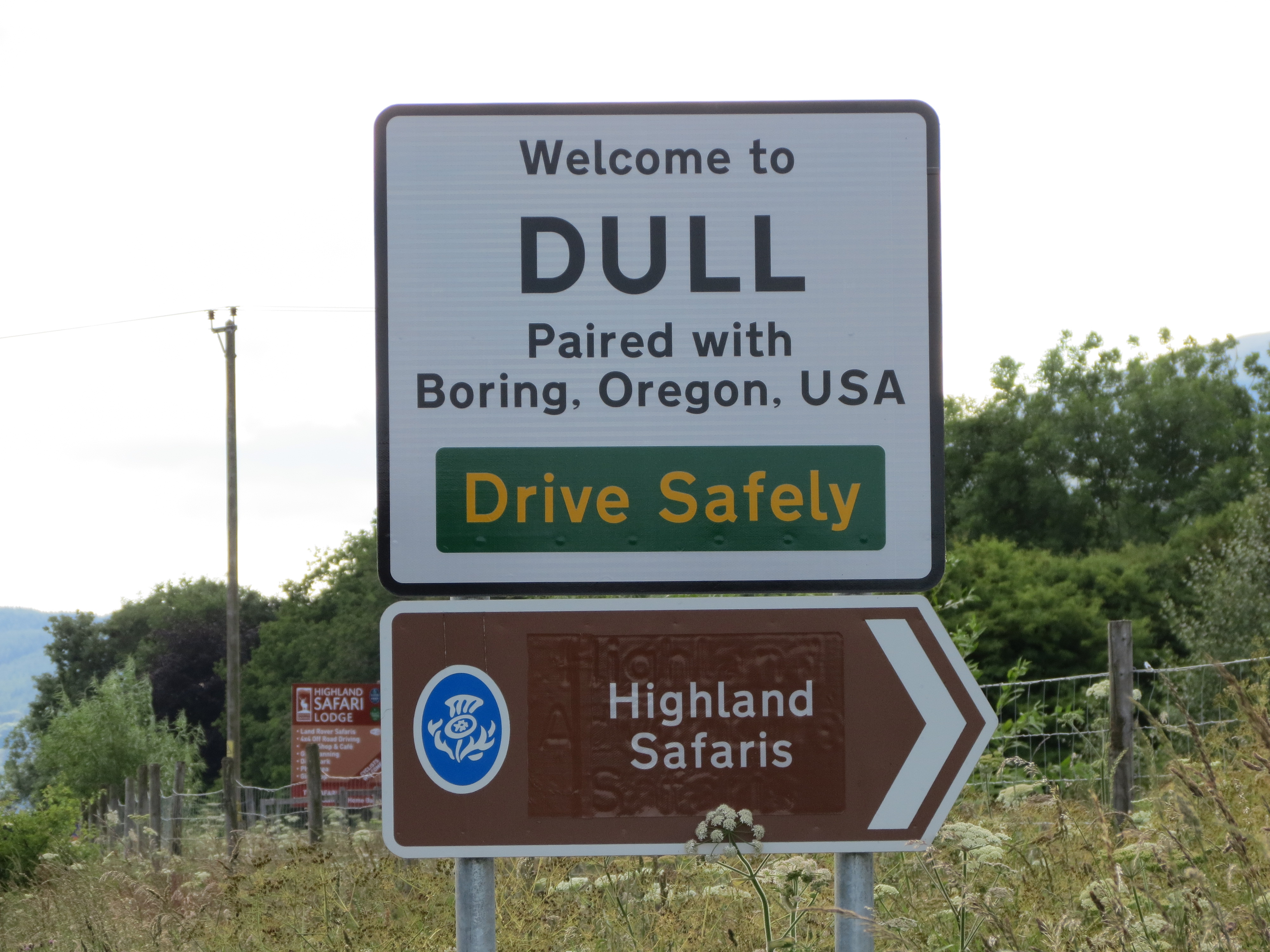
Dull welcome sign

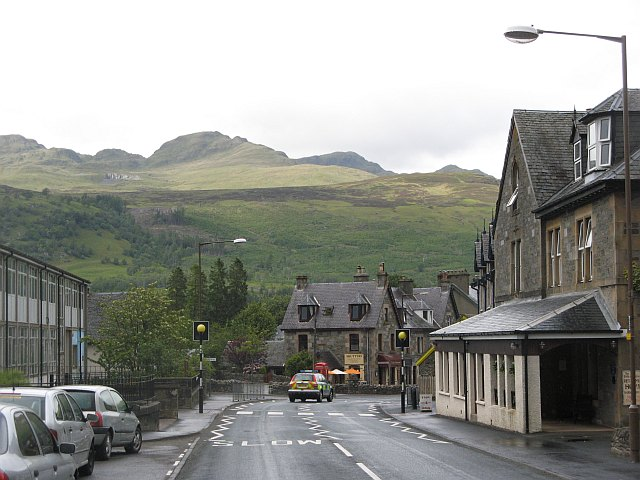
Killin

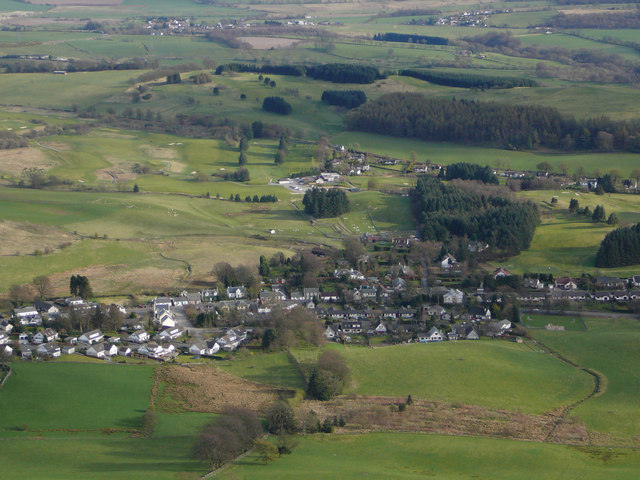
Pool of Muckhart

- Aberargie
- Aberdalgie
- Aberfeldy
- Aberfoyle
- Abermyte
- Abernethy
- Abernyte
- Aberuthven
- Achalader
- Achnafauld
- Acharn
- Airntully
- Aldclune
- Almondbank
- Alyth
- Amulree
- Ardeonaig
- Ardler
- Ardtalnaig
- Auchterarder
- Balbeggie
- Ballinluig
- Balquhidder
- Bankfoot
- Blackford
- Blair Atholl
- Blairgowrie
- Braco
- Bridge of Balgie
- Bridge of Earn
- Bridge of Tilt
- Burrelton
- Callander
- Cambuskenneth
- Campmuir
- Caputh
- Carpow
- Clunie
- Collace
- Cottown
- Coupar Angus
- Crianlarich
- Dunkeld and Birnam
- Comrie
- Craigie
- Crieff
- Dalguise
- Deanston
- Doune
- Dowally
- Dull
- Dunblane
- Dunkeld
- Dunning
- Edradynate
- Errol
- Fearnan
- Findo Gask
- Finegand
- Forgandenny
- Forteviot
- Fortingall
- Fowlis Easter
- Fowlis Wester
- Gartmore
- Glencarse
- Grandtully
- Grange
- Greenloaning
- Guildtown
- Harrietfield
- Huntingtower and Ruthvenfield
- Inchmagrannachan
- Inchture
- Inchyra
- Inveraman
- Invergowrie
- Invermay
- Kenmore
- Kettins
- Killiecrankie
- Killin
- Kilspindie
- Kinloch, Blairgowrie
- Kinloch, Coupar Angus
- Kinlochard
- Kinloch Rannoch
- Kinnaird, Atholl
- Kinnaird, Gowrie
- Kinorssie
- Kirkmichael
- Kirkton
- Lawers
- Leetown
- Lochearnhead
- Logierait
- Longforgan
- Luncarty
- Madderty
- Meigle
- Meikleour
- Methven
- Moneydie
- Monzievaird
- Murthly
- Muthill
- Old Blair
- Perth
- Piperdam
- Pitcairngreen
- Pitkeathly Wells
- Pitlochry
- Pool of Muckhart
- Powmill
- Rait
- Rattray
- Redgorton
- Rhynd
- St Fillans
- St Madoes
- Scone
- Spittal of Glenshee
- Spittalfield
- Stanley
- Strathtay
- Strathyre
- Thornhill
- Tibbermore
- Tullibardine
- Tyndrum
- Waterloo
- Weem
- Wolfhill
- Woodside

== Transport ==
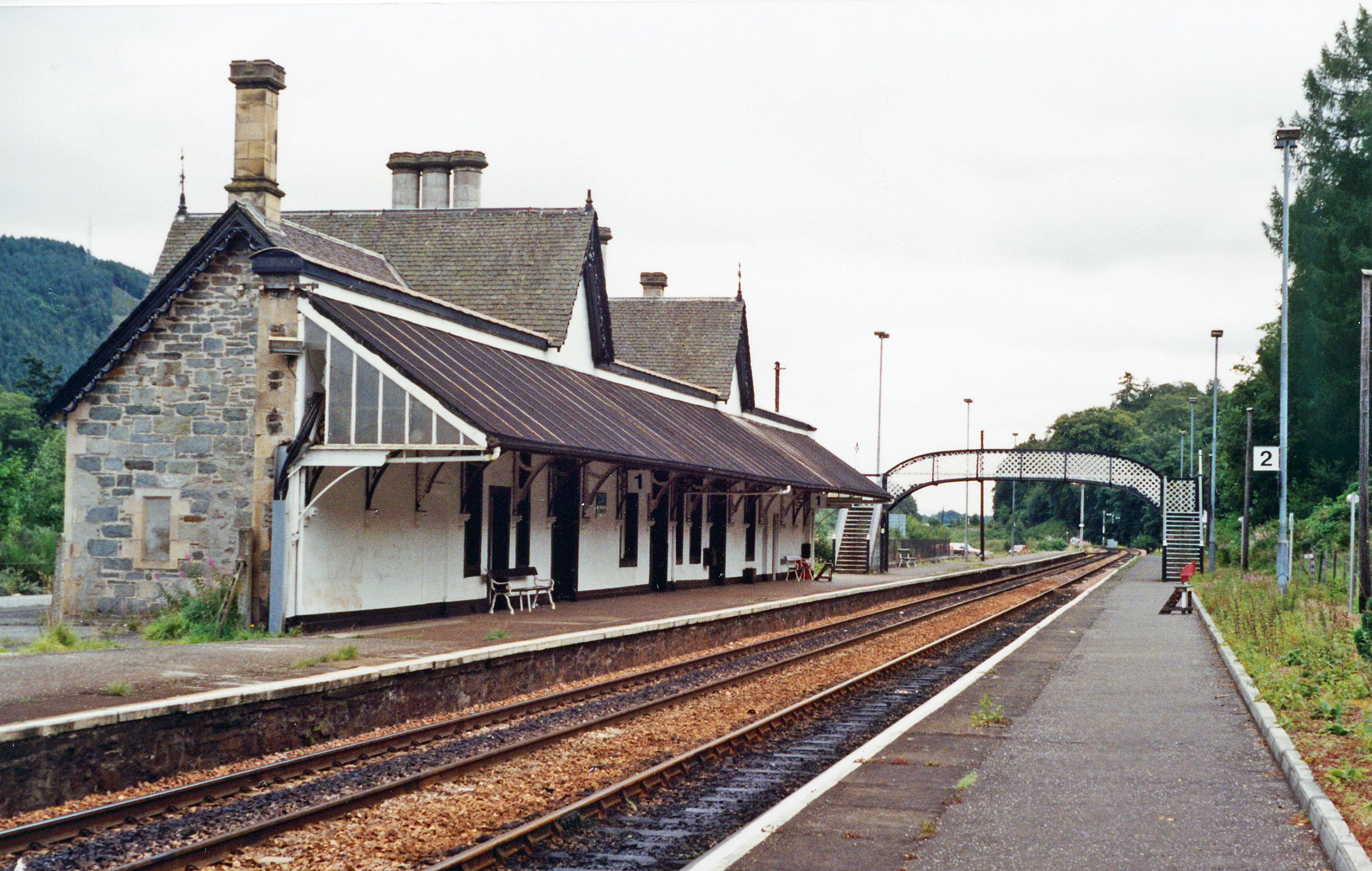
Dunkeld & Birnam railway station

The Highland Main Line railway line connects Perth to Inverness, and in the far west the West Highland Line criss-crosses the Perthshire-Argyllshire boundary. Other lines in the south-east link Perth to the towns of Fife and Stirlingshire.

== Parliamentary constituencies ==
Following the Act of Union, Perthshire returned members to the House of Commons of the Parliament of the United Kingdom from 1708.

=== 1707–1885 ===
- The Royal Burgh of Perth originally formed part of the Perth burghs constituency along with burghs in Fife and Forfarshire. The Representation of the People (Scotland) Act 1832 made Perth a separate burgh constituency.
- The remainder of the county returned a single member as the parliamentary county of Perthshire. The parishes of Tulliallan, Culross, Muckhart, and the Perthshire portions of the parishes of Logie and Fossaway were annexed to constituency of Clackmannanshire and Kinross in 1832.

=== 1885–1918 ===
In 1885 seats in the House of Commons were redistributed: Perthshire received three seats.

- Perth remained a burgh constituency.
- Perthshire Eastern
- Perthshire Western

=== 1918–1975 ===
In 1918 there was a further redistribution. Perthshire was combined with Kinross-shire to form a parliamentary county, divided into two constituencies:

- Perth constituency consisted of the burgh of Perth, the former Eastern constituency and part of the Western constituency. In 1950 it was renamed Perth and East Perthshire. The area included in the constituency was defined in 1948 and 1970 as the burghs of Perth, Abernethy, Alyth, Blairgowrie and Rattray and Coupar Angus; and the Eastern and Perth districts of the county of Perth.
- Kinross and Western Perthshire: the constituency consisted of the entire County of Kinross, the burghs of Aberfeldy, Auchterarder, Callander, Crieff, Doune, Dunblane and Pitlochry; and the Central, Highland and Western districts of the county of Perth.

These boundaries continued in use until 1983, when new constituencies were formed based on the Local Government regions and districts created in 1975.

=== 1975–2005 ===
Perthshire was represented in House of Commons of the United Kingdom from 1975 to 2005.

=== 2005-2024 ===
Perthshire had two constituencies and two Members of Parliament.

- Ochil and South Perthshire
- Perth and North Perthshire

=== 2024-present ===
Perthshire is now represented by the parliamentary constituencies of:

- Perth and Kinross-shire
- Angus and Perthshire Glens

== Notable places ==
- Ashintully Castle
- Balvaird Castle
- Birnam Wood and Dunsinane Hill, famous from Shakespeare's Macbeth
- Blair Castle
- Cateran Trail
- Dirnanean House
- Drummond Castle
- Dunkeld Cathedral
- Edradour Distillery
- Gleneagles Hotel
- The Hermitage
- Kindrogan House
- Scone Palace
- Near Strathtay and Strathmore, where many four-poster stone formations can be found

== Notable people ==
- Archbishop Patrick Adamson
- Duke of Atholl
- James Bannerman
- Anne Fraser Bon
- Edward Braddock
- Sir Archibald Campbell, 1st Baronet
- Baron Cameron of Balhousie
- James Croll
- Alan Cumming
- Sir Charles Douglas
- David Douglas
- Daniel Dow
- Duleep Singh
- Alexander Duff
- Thomas Duncan
- Adam Ferguson
- William Flockhart
- Duncan Forbes
- Niel Gow
- James Graham, 1st Marquess of Montrose
- Thomas Graham, 1st Baron Lynedoch
- Stephen Hendry
- Lady of Lawers
- Alexander Leslie, 1st Earl of Leven
- Alexander Mackenzie
- Dougie MacLean
- John Macleod
- Ewan McGregor
- Sir Charles Menzies
- Lord George Murray
- Sir George Murray
- Baron Reid
- J. K. Rowling
- James Small
- Major-General John Small
- William Small
- Rory Stewart
- Magdalene Stirling
- Robert Stirling
- George Thompson, recipient of the Victoria Cross
- John Sen Inches Thomson
- Dr William Marshall

== Schools ==
- Ardvreck School
- The Community School of Auchterarder
- Blairgowrie High School
- Breadalbane Academy
- Craigclowan Preparatory School
- Dollar Academy
- Glenalmond College
- Inch view primary and nursery school
- Kilgraston School
- Morrison's Academy
- Perth Academy
- Perth Grammar School
- Perth High School
- Pitlochry High School
- Rattray Primary School
- Strathallan School
- Strathearn Community Campus

== See also ==
- Earl of Perth
- Glasgow Perthshire Charitable Society
- Highland Perthshire
- Perthshire Rugby Football Club
- Perth and Kinross
- Scottish Highlands
- Stirling
- Trossachs
- List of counties of Scotland 1890–1975
