= Sròn =

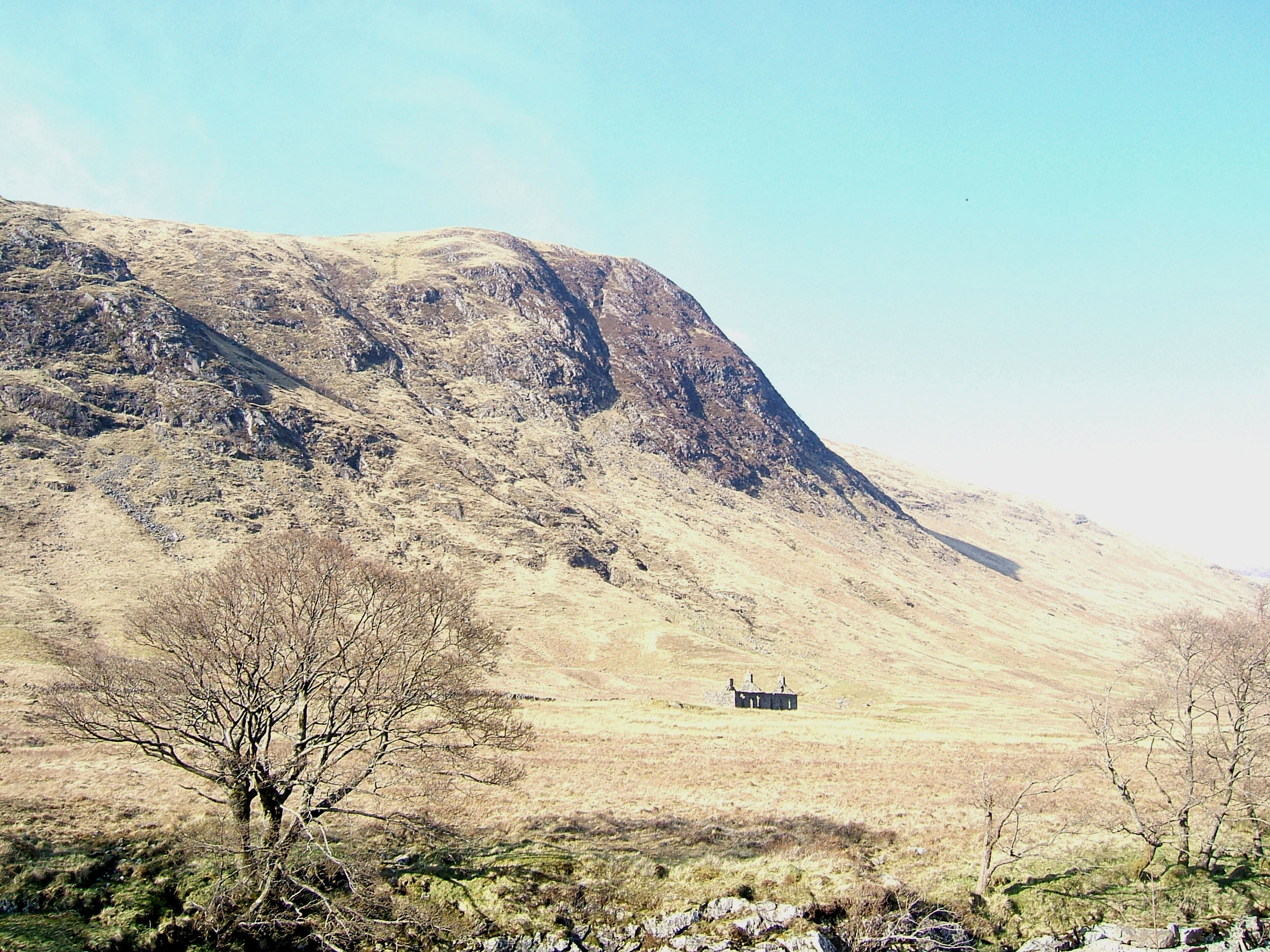
Sròn a' Chorra Bhuilg, a typical "Nose", above Creag-bheiteachain in Glen Scaddle

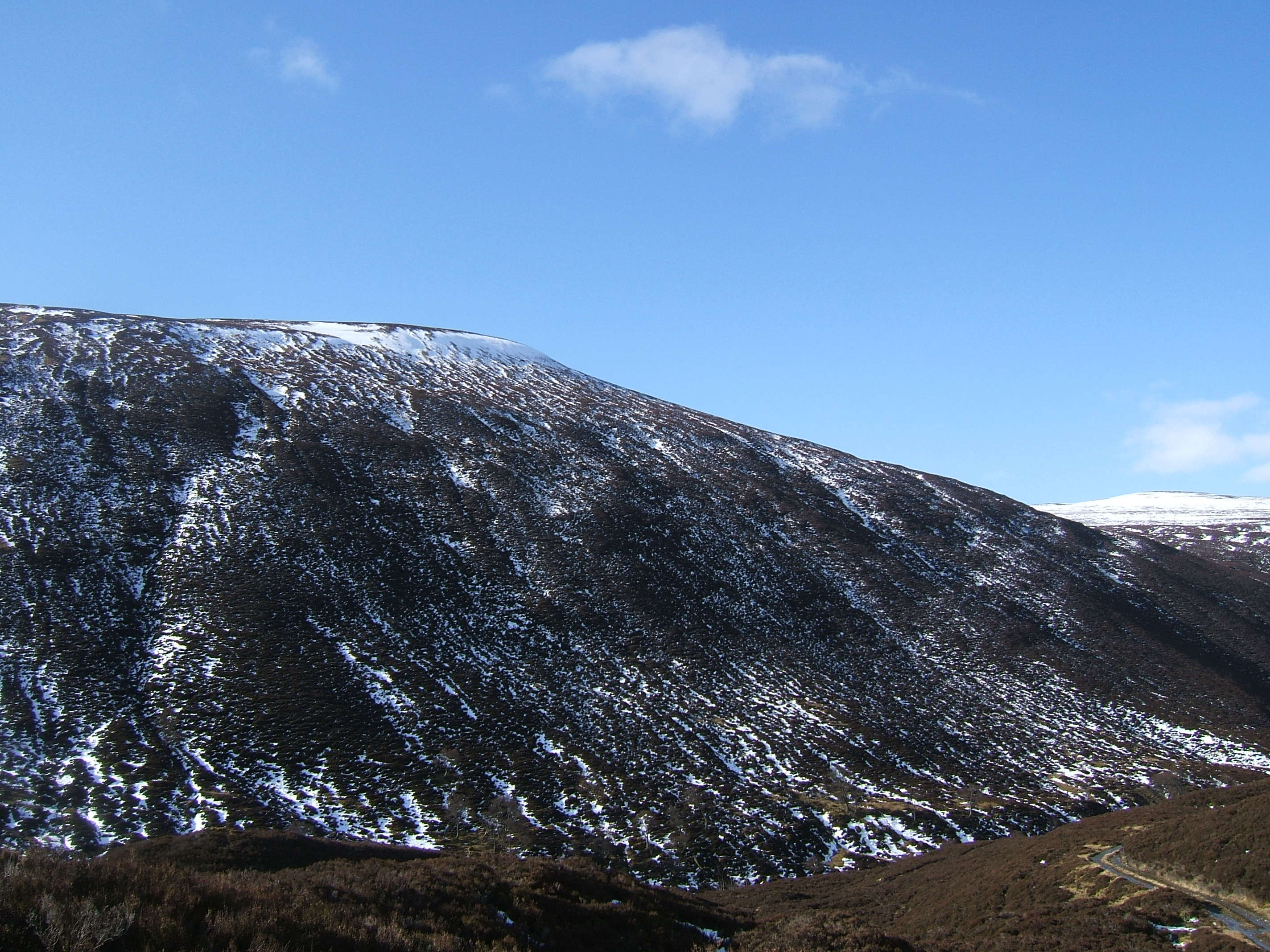
Sròn na Ban-righ, the Queen's Nose, in Glen Feshie

Sròn (Note: Before the abolition of the acute accent in Scottish Gaelic, it was sometimes spelt as srón.) is the Scottish Gaelic word meaning nose or point and is the name of some hills in the Scottish Highlands.

The name "sròn" is often applied to pointed hills or promontories that form the edge of a mountain massive, giving the appearance of a nose-like ridge. As such, they are often not the highest hilltops; in fact only one of the 282 Munros is called Sròn: Sròn a' Choire Ghairbh ("the nose of the rough corrie"), located west of Loch Lochy.

Sròn also appears in names of towns (often anglicized as Stron), such as Strontian (Sròn an t-Sìtheinn), the point of the fairy hill (Sìth), and Stranraer, (An t-Sròn Reamhar) the broad point.

== See also ==
- Lochan Sròn Smeur, an upland loch in Tayside, Scotland
