= Loch Scoly =

- Location within Perth and Kinross
- Location: NN91814776
- Coordinates: 56.609600°N 3.7639°W
- Type: freshwater loch
- Max. length: 0.804 km (0.500 mi)
- Max. width: 0.402 km (0.250 mi)
- Surface area: 3.7 ha (9.1 acres)
- Average depth: 5.75 ft (1.75 m)
- Max. depth: 12 ft (3.7 m)
- Shore length^{1}: 0.9 km (0.56 mi)
- Surface elevation: 388 m (1,273 ft)
- ^{1} Shore length is not a well-defined measure.

Loch Scoly is a small hill loch, lying to the north-east of Loch Kennard and west of Loch Skiach, on Grandtully Hill within Perth and Kinross, Scotland.
