= Inchmagrannachan =

Hamlet in Scotland

Coordinates: 56.581944°N 3.6275°W

- Location within Perth and Kinross
- OS grid reference: NO001445
- Community council: Dunkeld and Birnam
- Council area: Perth and Kinross
- Lieutenancy area: Perth and Kinross
- Country: Scotland
- Sovereign state: United Kingdom
- Post town: DUNKELD
- Postcode district: PH8
- Dialling code: 01350
- Police: Scotland
- Fire: Scottish
- Ambulance: Scottish
- UK Parliament: Angus and Perthshire Glens
- Scottish Parliament: Perthshire North

Inchmagrannachan (/ɪntʃmɑːɡrænəxən/), is a hamlet in the Strathtay area of Highland Perthshire, Scotland, 3 km north-west of Dunkeld. The River Tay passes the hamlet to the east.

The hamlet is surrounded by woodland and hills. The forest to the north is called Dalmarnock Wood. The short Littleton Burn passes through the hamlet from west to east before shortly flowing into the Tay, splitting the village, with most houses on the north side.

The nearest train station is Dunkeld & Birnam.
