= Loch Benachally =

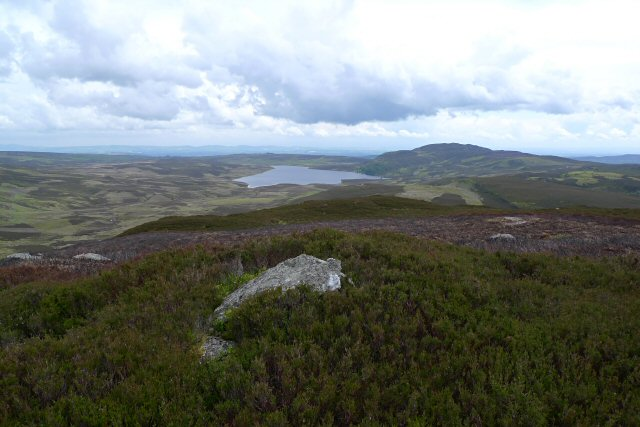
- The summit of Spurn Hill looking south by south-east to Loch Benachally in the distance.

- Location in Perth and Kinross
- Location: NO071502
- Coordinates: 56.635°N 3.516°W
- Type: freshwater reservoir
- Primary outflows: Benachally Burn
- Max. length: 1.641 km (1.020 mi)
- Max. width: 0.74 km (0.46 mi)
- Surface area: 173 ha (430 acres)
- Average depth: 24.93 ft (7.60 m)
- Max. depth: 63.97 ft (19.50 m)
- Water volume: 179,777,998 ft^{3} (5,090,746.0 m^{3})
- Shore length^{1}: 4 km (2.5 mi)
- Surface elevation: 308 m (1,010 ft)
- Max. temperature: 57.2 °F (14.0 °C)
- Min. temperature: 48.8 °F (9.3 °C)
- Islands: 0
- ^{1} Shore length is not a well-defined measure.

Loch Benachally is a large shallow freshwater reservoir that is located close to the Forest of Clunie in Perth and Kinross, Scotland.

The reservoir is operated by Scottish Water.

== Iron Age villages ==
Directly south-east of the reservoir are the remains of an Iron Age hut circle settlement and field system, centred on NO08354982, that can clearly be seen from an aerial view. The settlement consisted of a line of 6 hut circles connected by a common baulk, with an isolated hut about 37 metres (121 ft) to the east. The huts range from 13 metres (43 ft) down to 8.3 metres (27 ft) between wall centres. Some huts have stone enclosures. The field system of the Iron Age settlement has been visibly preserved down the ages and is marked with the remains of lynchets, walls and heaps of cleared stone. As the huts are in a straight line, they resemble a street. The conspicuousness of the "street" is enhanced by a wall which runs parallel to the row of houses, 15 metres (49 ft) to the south.

To the east-north-east of the Loch Benachally directly from the dam at the very south of the loch, is another Iron Age hut circle settlement and field system. Here as well, the field system is easily recognisable. The hut circle settlement follows a north-west to south-east orientation and is a larger settlement with 12 hut circles. The huts measure from 11.3 metres (37 ft) down to 3.7 metres (12 ft) between wall centres. There are two fields—a large field to the north and west of the hut circle group, and a small field to the south.
