= Loch Loch =

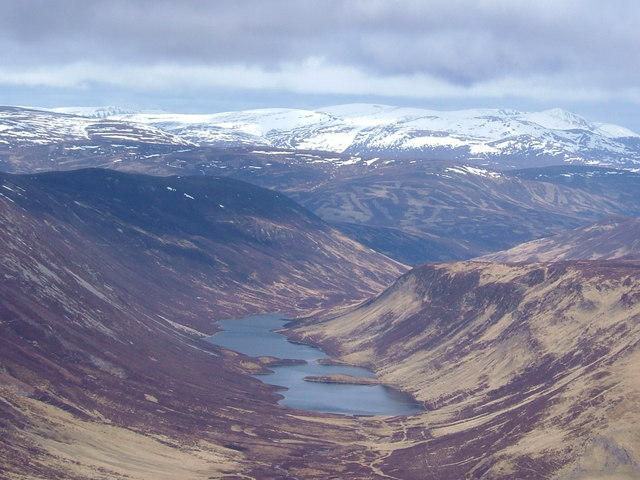
- Loch Loch from the summit of Ben Vuirich

- Location within Perth and Kinross
- Location: NN985745
- Coordinates: 56.8514°N 3.6647°W
- Type: freshwater loch
- Primary outflows: River Tilt
- Max. length: 2.011 km (1.250 mi)
- Max. width: 1.207 km (0.750 mi)
- Surface area: 31.8 ha (79 acres)
- Average depth: 29 ft (8.8 m)
- Max. depth: 81 ft (25 m)
- Water volume: 103,197,000 ft^{3} (2,922,200 m^{3})
- Shore length^{1}: 4.5 km (2.8 mi)
- Surface elevation: 453 m (1,486 ft)
- Max. temperature: 52.2 °F (11.2 °C)
- Min. temperature: 49.5 °F (9.7 °C)
- Islands: 0
- ^{1} Shore length is not a well-defined measure.

Loch Loch is a remote freshwater loch, located in Glen Loch in Perth and Kinross, some 9.5 miles north of Pitlochry, Scotland and is within the Forest of Atholl.

== Geography ==
Loch Loch is situated in wild mountainous scenery and is located with hills on both sides that have very steep sides. Beinn a' Ghlò is situated to the west side and the precipitous crags of Creag an Loch in the east. Mounds of gravelly moraine form the greater part of both shores, forming the prominent points. The loch flows northward by the An Lochain into the River Tilt, which also receives the water of Loch Tilt at the head of the glen. The loch is on a north to south bearing, and is long and narrow loch, or rather two lochs as there is a narrow constriction in the middle dividing it into two portions.
