= Loch Essan =

Loch Essen
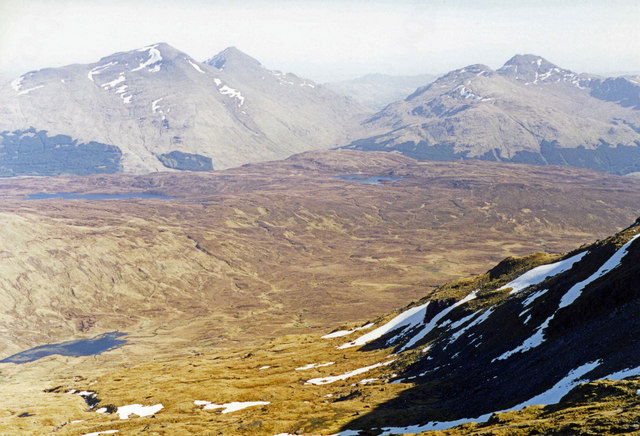
- View from Ben Challum Ben More, Stob Binnien and Cruach Ardrain (left to right). The two lochs in the middle distance are Loch Maragan and Loch Essan.

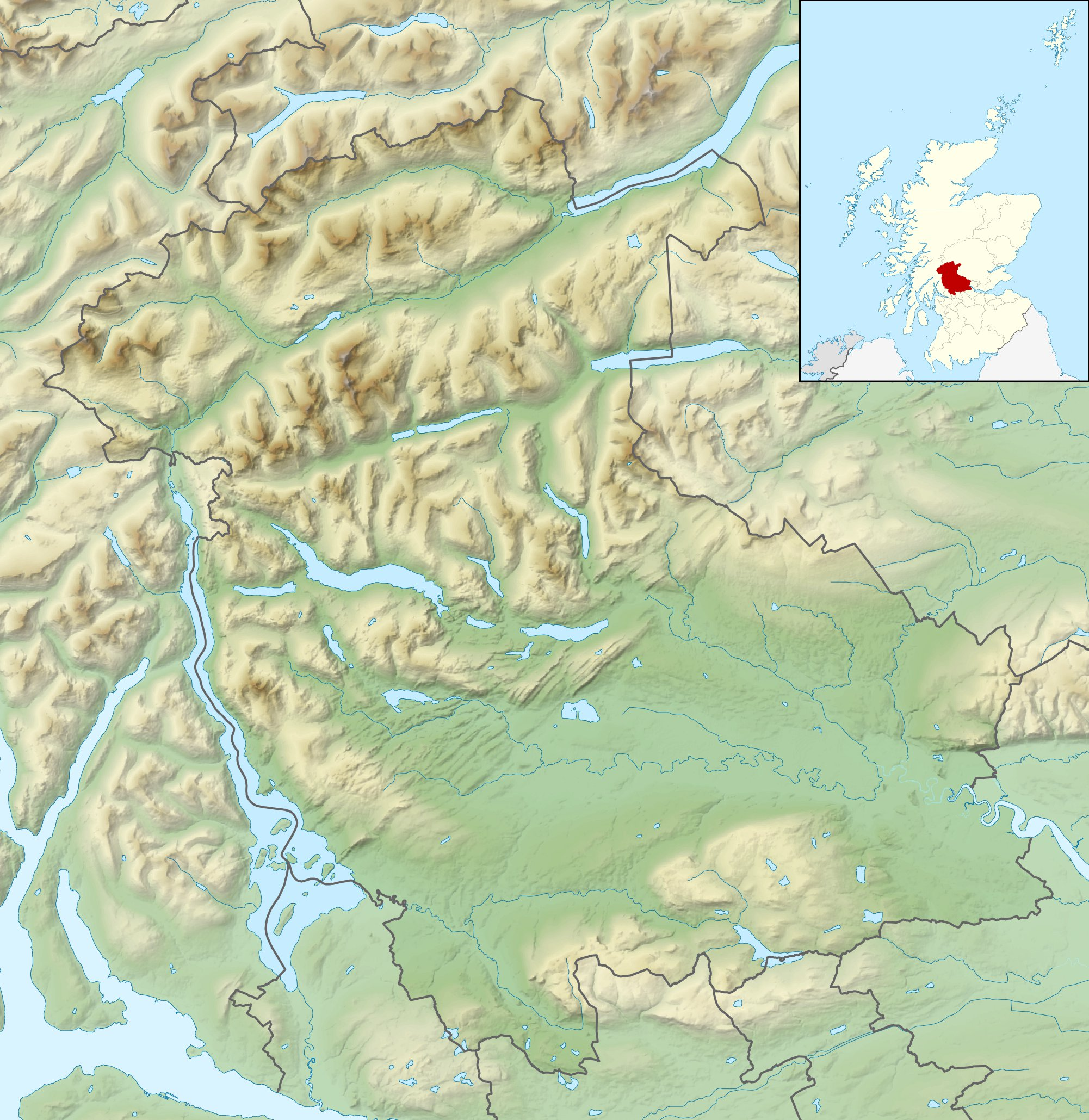
- Location within Stirling
- Location: NN412285
- Coordinates: 56.422°N 4.5748°W
- Type: freshwater loch
- Max. length: 0.804 km (0.500 mi)
- Max. width: 0.40 km (0.25 mi)
- Surface area: 11.7 ha (29 acres)
- Average depth: 7 ft (2.1 m)
- Max. depth: 18 ft (5.5 m)
- Water volume: 9,664,000 ft^{3} (273,700 m^{3})
- Shore length^{1}: 2 km (1.2 mi)
- Surface elevation: 441 m (1,447 ft)
- Max. temperature: 57.5 °F (14.2 °C)
- Min. temperature: 48 °F (9 °C)
- Islands: 0
- ^{1} Shore length is not a well-defined measure.

Loch Essan is a freshwater trout loch, located 2 miles north of Loch Dochart, within the Stirling Council Area, Scotland.

== Settlements ==
On the mid north coast of the loch is the remains of four Shieling hut with no roofs. The huts would have been used as lodges for shepherds, summer livestock grazers, and much later, after the Highland Clearances, fly fisherman, before they fell into disrepair due to lack of maintenance. The loch now a bothy, a former 3 roomed shepherd's cottage.
