= Loch Beanie =

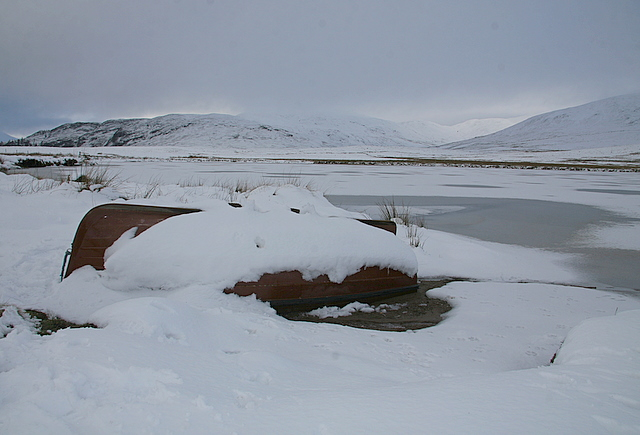
- View of the small fishing boat next to Loch Beanie.

- Location in Perth and Kinross
- Location: NO16036865
- Coordinates: 56.80199814°N 3.37682275°W
- Type: freshwater loch
- Primary outflows: Allt Mòr into Shee Water
- Max. length: 0.804672 km (0.500000 mi)
- Max. width: 0.321869 km (0.200000 mi)
- Surface area: 17 ha (42 acres)
- Average depth: 17.71 ft (5.40 m)
- Max. depth: 17.71 ft (5.40 m)
- Water volume: 32,079,387 ft^{3} (908,387.1 m^{3})
- Shore length^{1}: 2 km (1.2 mi)
- Surface elevation: 406 m (1,332 ft)
- Max. temperature: 59.2 °F (15.1 °C)
- Min. temperature: 59.2 °F (15.1 °C)
- Islands: 1
- ^{1} Shore length is not a well-defined measure.

Loch Beanie also known as Loch Shechernich, is a small shallow freshwater loch that is located in Glen Shee in Perth and Kinross, Scotland.

== Island ==
At the centre of the island, roughly 100 metres from the southern shore is a Crannog that is constructed of boulders and small stones. Less than a third of the surface of the island is visible above water.

A building perhaps once existed on the loch. In a map by Timothy Pont circa 1600, a mansion is depicted on the island, with the annotation: Loch Sesatut, sumtyms ye dwelling of ye chief man of Glenshy and Strathardle. In a map by Robert Gordon of Straloch circa 1636–1648, the building is noted as 'L. Sesatur old chief dwelling of Glens(hie). By 1747, all knowledge of the island had been forgotten.

== See also ==
- List of lochs in Scotland
