= Pond of Drummond =

- Location in Perth and Kinross
- Location: NN85541858
- Coordinates: 56.346°N 3.854°W
- Type: freshwater reservoir
- Primary outflows: River Earn
- Max. length: 1.0621 km (0.6600 mi)
- Max. width: 0.5310835 km (0.3300000 mi)
- Surface area: 34 ha (84 acres)
- Average depth: 5 ft (1.5 m)
- Max. depth: 12 ft (3.7 m)
- Water volume: 20,157,000 ft^{3} (570,800 m^{3})
- Shore length^{1}: 3 km (1.9 mi)
- Surface elevation: 47 m (154 ft)
- Islands: 0
- ^{1} Shore length is not a well-defined measure.

Pond of Drummond is a small shallow freshwater artificial loch in the grounds of Drummond Castle, and is orientated on an east to west orientation, being located 2 miles southeast of Crieff in Perth and Kinross.

== Sunken village ==
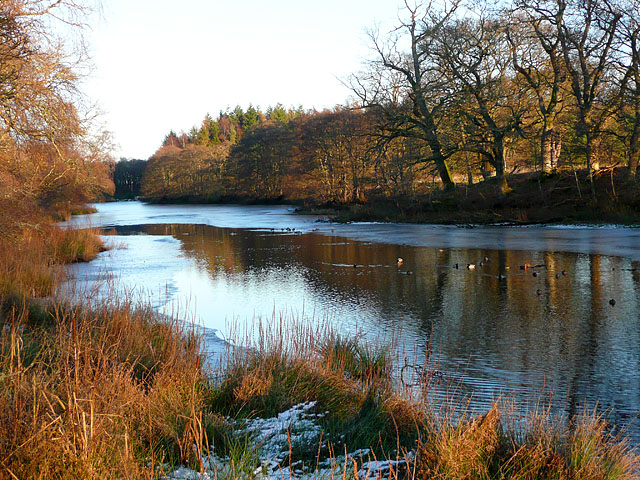
Bennybeg Pond A long shallow pond fed by the outflow from Pond of Drummond. Popular with ducks and other waterfowl.

On images of the small loch, when viewing oblique aerial images, the outline of a planned village can clearly been seen. The area covered by the loch was once a cultivated valley that was seized by the Forfeited Estates Commission after the Jacobite rising of 1745 and were portioned out as a reward to those who supported the government. When all those folk had died, Lady Jean (Lady Perth) converted the small valley into a loch, sometime between 1785 and 1800. The plan of the loch shows a street on an east to west alignment, with houses on either side of the street. Each house has a 1-acre plot, laid out at 90° degrees to the right, behind it. The village was known to extend east to a military road. The features that are visible below the water line are the main axial road with some plot boundaries visible. The west end of the loch below the water line are not visible due to the increasing depth at that end. The small river flows out of Pond of Drummond to the east into BennyBeg pond, a long shallow pond on an east to west orientation. The village may have extended to the boundaries of that pond 0.5 mile to the east.

== See also ==
- List of lochs in Scotland
- List of reservoirs and dams in the United Kingdom
