= Loch Iubhair =

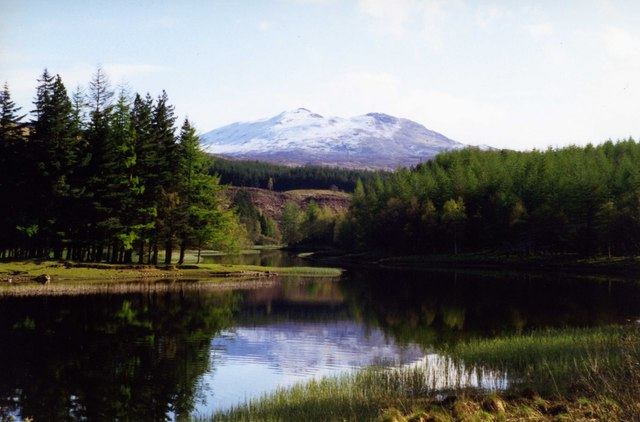
- Loch Iubhair Glen Dochart – the mountain in the distance is Sgiath Chuil.

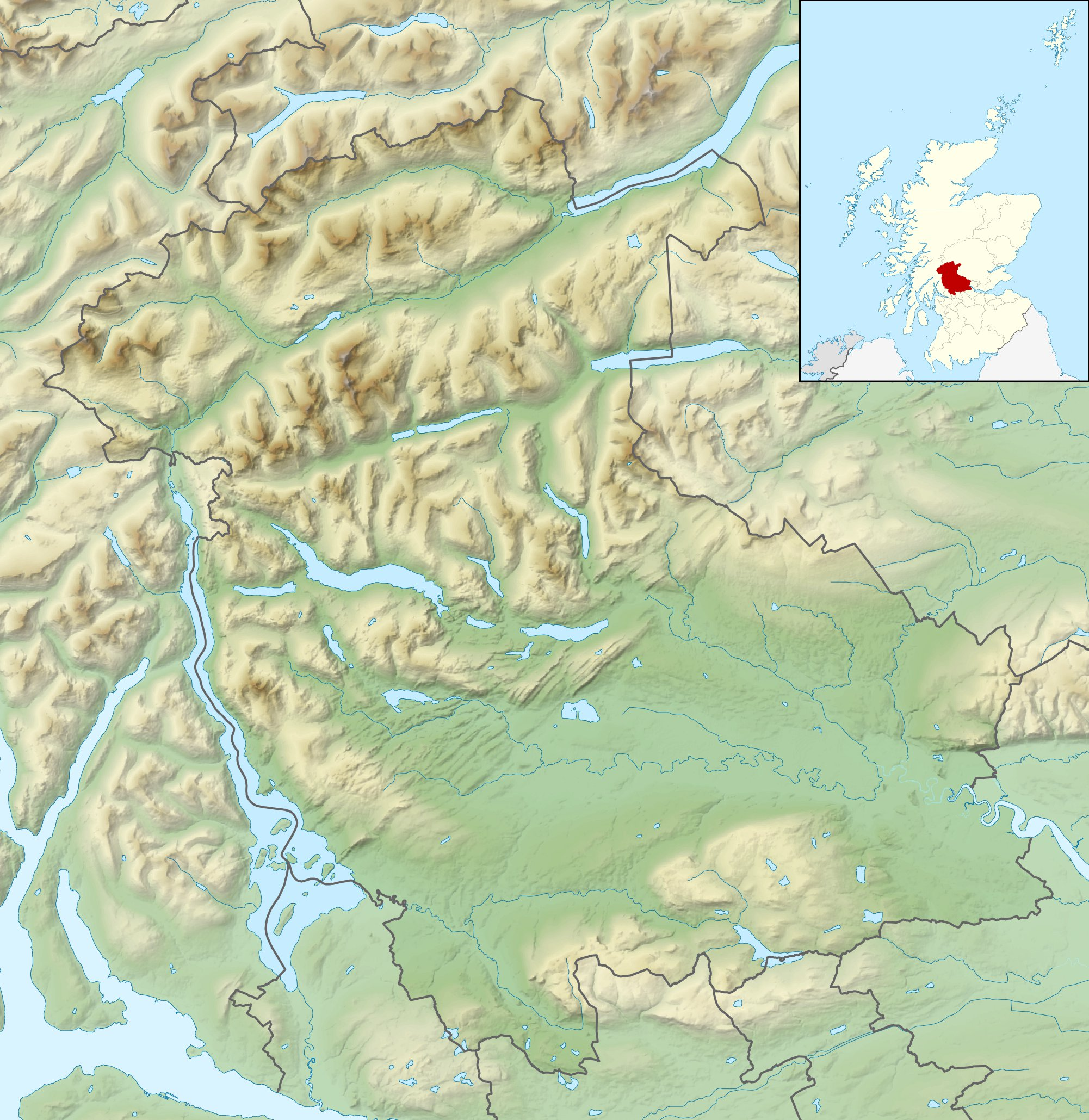
- Location within Stirling
- Coordinates: 56.4083°N 4.553°W
- Type: freshwater loch
- Primary outflows: River Dochart
- Max. length: 2.1 km (1.3 mi)
- Max. width: 480 m (520 yd)
- Surface area: 60 ha (150 acres)
- Average depth: 7.5 m (25 ft)
- Max. depth: 20 m (65 ft)
- Shore length^{1}: 7.4 km (4.6 mi)
- Surface elevation: 152 m (499 ft)
- ^{1} Shore length is not a well-defined measure.

Loch Iubhair pronounced yoo-ar meaning yew loch, is a freshwater loch, located in Glen Dochart, and six kilometres (four miles) east of the village of Crianlarich. Loch Dochart is located immediately southeast, and the outflow of Loch Dochart, as the River Dochart flows into Loch Iubhair.
