= Clunie =

Village in Perthshire, Scotland

Coordinates: 56.577645°N 3.451953°W

Clunie: Scottish Gaelic: Cluainidh
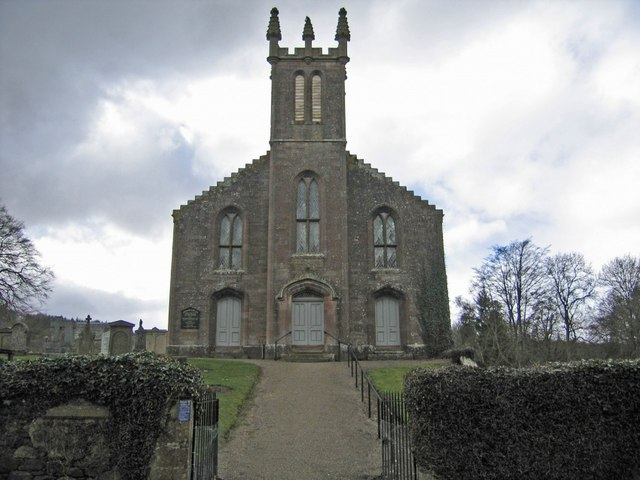
- Clunie Church

- Location within Perth and Kinross
- OS grid reference: NO109438
- Council area: Perth and Kinross
- Lieutenancy area: Perth and Kinross
- Country: Scotland
- Sovereign state: United Kingdom
- Post town: BLAIRGOWRIE
- Postcode district: PH10
- Dialling code: 01250
- Police: Scotland
- Fire: Scottish
- Ambulance: Scottish
- UK Parliament: Angus and Perthshire Glens
- Scottish Parliament: Perthshire North

Clunie is a small settlement in Perthshire, Scotland, four miles (six kilometres) west of Blairgowrie. It lies on the western shore of the Loch of Clunie.

== History ==
Near the village on a small hill are the foundations of an early defensive settlement. The fortifications on the site date back to the 9th century and even Iron Age material has been discovered at the site. There is also evidence of defensive structures nearby to this hill fort dating back to the Roman period. One notable use of this hill site was by Kenneth MacAlpin, the first king of Scotland, as a base for hunting in the nearby royal forest of Clunie. English troops occupied the site following their victory at the Battle of Dunbar during the First War of Scottish Independence.

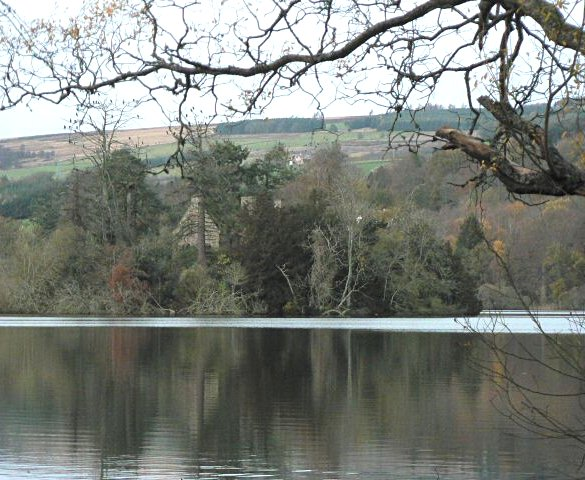
Clunie Castle on the island in Loch of Clunie.

On a small island (formerly a crannog) in the loch stand the remains of Clunie Castle, a tower house of the bishops of Dunkeld.

The current parish church in the village dates from 1840, designed by Perth architect William Macdonald Mackenzie, replacing a previous structure with a new bell tower. Within the grounds stands a mausoleum with a romanesque doorway thought to be from an earlier 12th- or 13th-century church that stood on the same site. The church is now linked with those at Kinclaven and Caputh.

There is a cairn style war memorial in the village park which was erected in 1946 to mark two locals who lost their life in World War II. The cairn also displays nine names of soldiers from the area who died during World War I.

Clunie village hall dates from 1912 and is still used by the local community for functions, clubs and events.

== Notable people ==
Clunie is the birthplace of John Macleod, co-recipient of the 1923 Nobel prize in Physiology or Medicine.
