= Moneydie =

Coordinates: 56.44977°N 3.516435°W

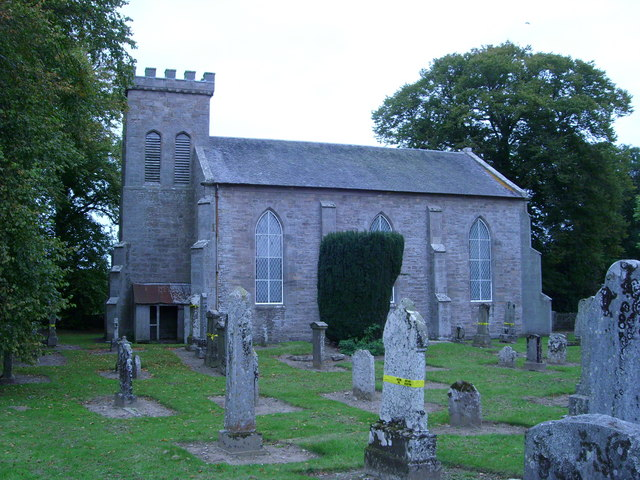

- Location within Perth and Kinross
- Council area: Perth and Kinross
- Lieutenancy area: Perth and Kinross
- Country: Scotland
- Sovereign state: United Kingdom
- Post town: PERTH
- Postcode district: PH1
- Dialling code: 01738
- Police: Scotland
- Fire: Scottish
- Ambulance: Scottish
- Scottish Parliament: North Tayside; North East Scotland

Moneydie {/ˌmʌnˈiːˌɗiː/} is a small hamlet and former parish in Perth and Kinross. It is about 6 miles (10 kilometres) northwest of Perth.

== Parish history ==
In January 1979 the Parish of Moneydie merged with the parish of Auchtergaven in nearby Bankfoot creating Auchtergaven and Moneydie parish.
