= Achnafauld =

Settlement in Scotland

Coordinates: 56.505271°N 3.829403°W

Achnafauld: Scottish Gaelic: Achadh na Follt
- Location within Perth and Kinross
- OS grid reference: NN875363
- Council area: Perth and Kinross
- Country: Scotland
- Sovereign state: United Kingdom
- Post town: ABERFELDY
- Postcode district: PH15
- Dialling code: 01887
- Police: Scotland
- Fire: Scottish
- Ambulance: Scottish

Achnafauld (/ˌæxnəˈfɔːld/, Scottish Gaelic: Achadh na Follt) is a settlement in the Scottish Highlands, about 15 miles (24 km) northwest of Perth. It is located in the parish of Dull in the council area of Perth and Kinross.

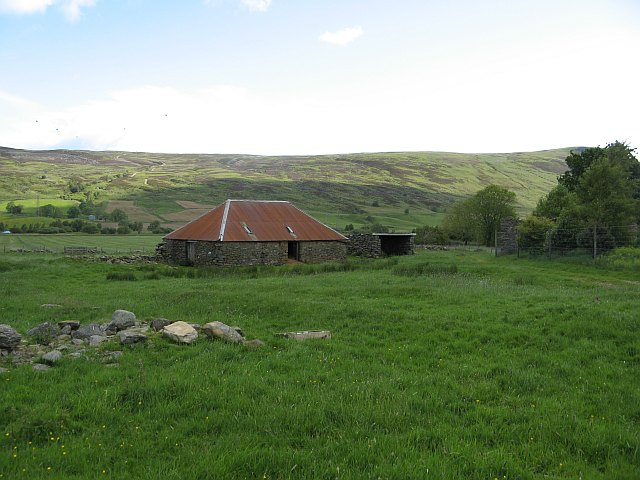
Achnafauld

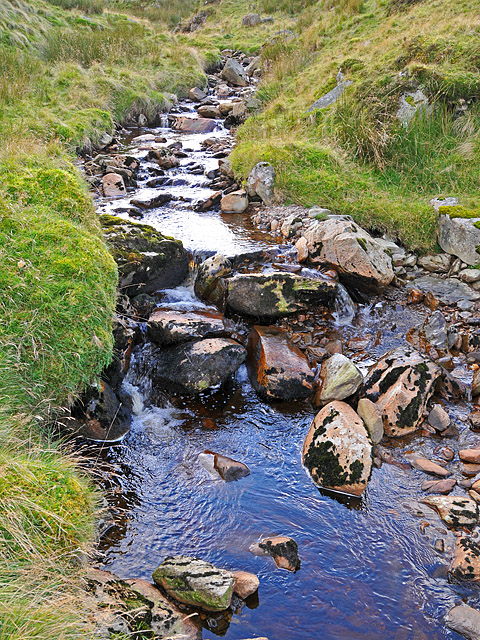
The Achnafauld Burn
