= Loch Hoil =

Loch in Perth and Kinross, Scotland

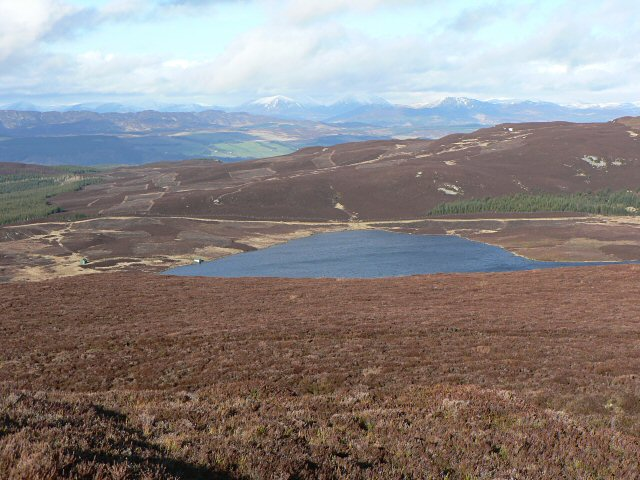
- Loch Hoil from Meall Odhar. The mountains of the Beinn a' Ghlò range are on the skyline.

- Location within Perth and Kinross
- Location: NN86004346
- Coordinates: 56.56990051°N 3.85611465°W
- Type: freshwater loch
- Primary outflows: Cochill Burn
- Catchment area: 114 ha (280 acres)
- Max. length: 0.33 km (0.21 mi)
- Max. width: 0.14 km (0.087 mi)
- Surface area: 14 ha (35 acres)
- Average depth: 19 ft (5.8 m)
- Max. depth: 45 ft (14 m)
- Water volume: 29,271,000 ft^{3} (828,900 m^{3})
- Shore length^{1}: 2 km (1.2 mi)
- Surface elevation: 496 m (1,627 ft)
- Max. temperature: 57 °F (14 °C)
- Min. temperature: 47 °F (8 °C)
- Islands: 0
- ^{1} Shore length is not a well-defined measure.

Loch Hoil is a small freshwater lochan located between the shallow hills between Strath Braan and Strath Tay valley's in Perth and Kinross. Aberfeldy is located 4.0 miles (6.4 km) to the north.

== See also ==
- List of lochs in Scotland

== Gallery ==
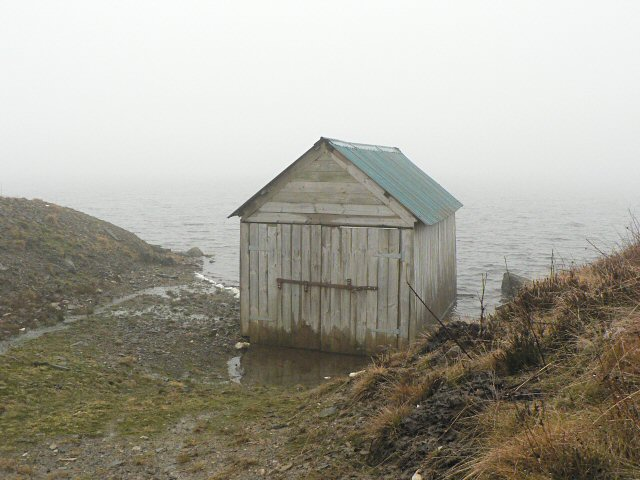
Boathouse, Loch Hoil This hut hasn't really slipped into the water, as it appears here. From the side it can be seen as standing on short posts.

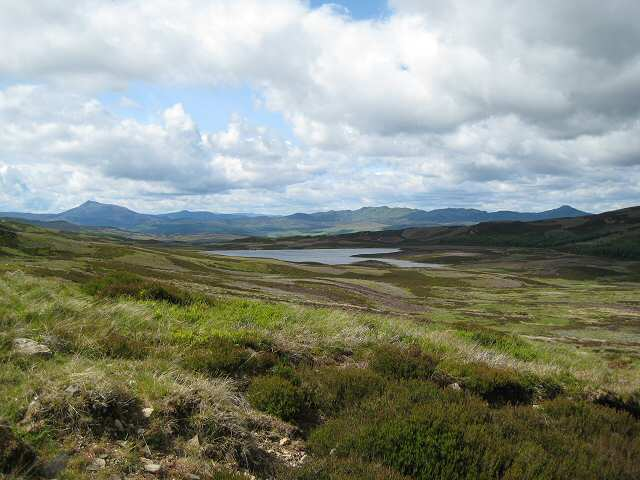
View towards Loch Hoil Looking down from the track towards Loch Hoil, with Schiehallion on the skyline to the left.

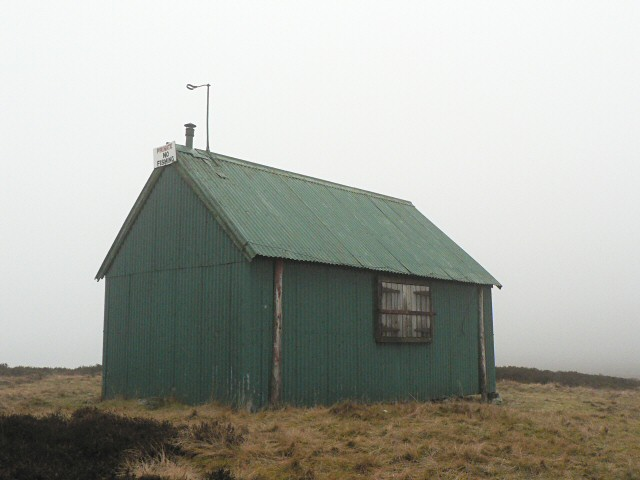
Fishing hut, Loch Hoil Taken in mist.

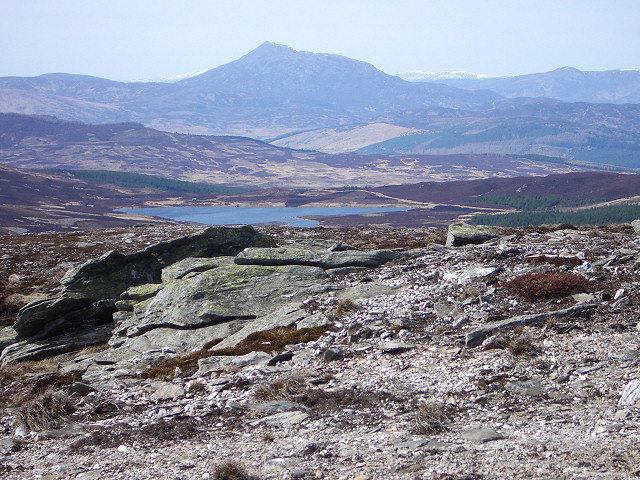
Schiehallion from Meall Dearg. Looking north-west from the stony plateau of Meall Dearg there is a good view of Schiehallion beyond Loch Hoil and the Tay valley.

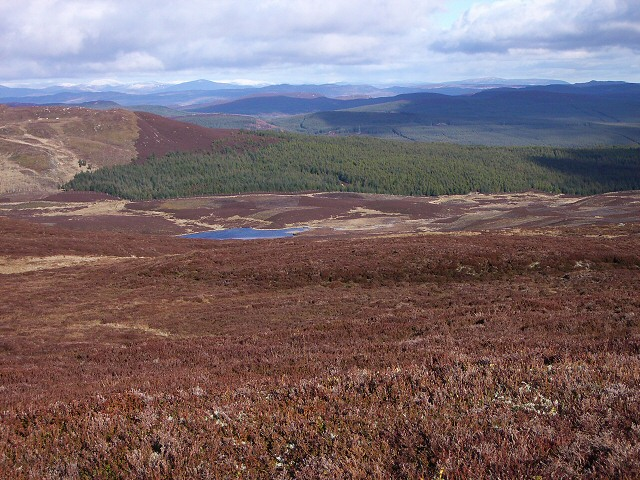
View from Meall Odhar ridge Looking down the heathery slopes of Meall Odhar, with Loch Hoil below. A vast area of forestry extends north-eastwards beyond the loch. Relatively modest hills often have excellent views and this is no exception.
