= Loch Skiach =

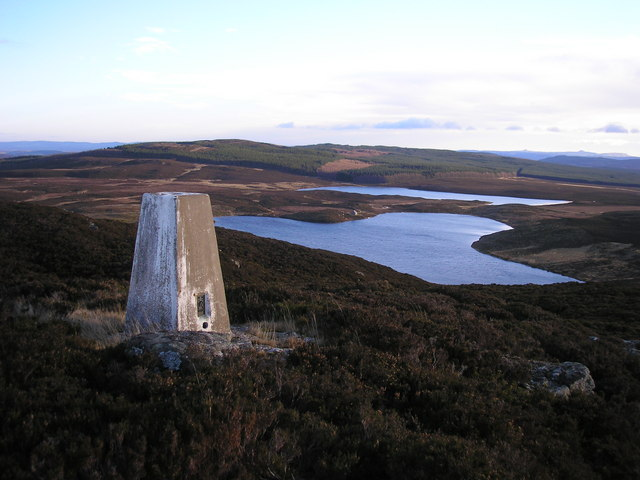
- The view from the cairn next to the trig point on Craig Lochie. Loch Skiach and Little Loch Skiach can be seen in the distance. The hill directly above the trig point is Elrick More, which is only 4 m (13 ft) lower than the summit of Craig Lochie.

- Location within Perth and Kinross
- Location: NN950475
- Coordinates: 56.6085°N 3.7106°W
- Type: freshwater loch
- Max. length: 1.6 km (1 mi)
- Max. width: 0.8 km (0.50 mi)
- Surface area: 39.1 ha (97 acres)
- Average depth: 5.5 m (18 ft)
- Max. depth: 17 m (55 ft)
- Water volume: 2,185,600 m^{3} (77,185,000 ft^{3})
- Shore length^{1}: 4 km (2.5 mi)
- Surface elevation: 427 m (1,401 ft)
- Max. temperature: 15.6 °C (60.0 °F)
- Min. temperature: 8.6 °C (47.5 °F)
- Islands: 0
- ^{1} Shore length is not a well-defined measure.

Loch Skiach is a small freshwater loch in Perth and Kinross, Scotland, situated 4 miles (6.4 km) southwest of Ballinluig. Directly south of Loch Skiach is the smaller Little Loch Skiach

== Gallery ==
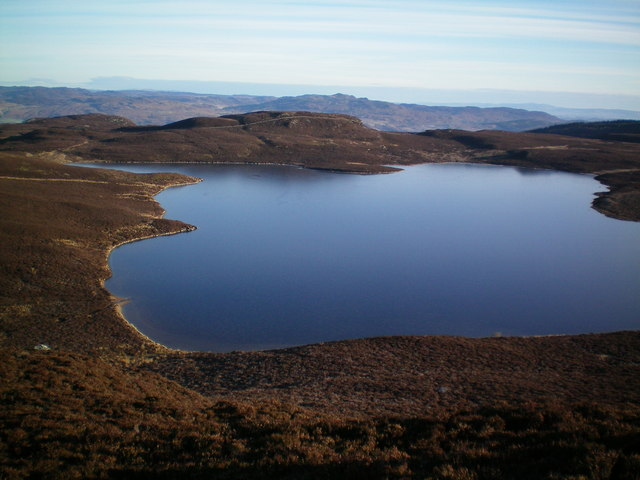
Loch Skiach from Craig Lochie E spur

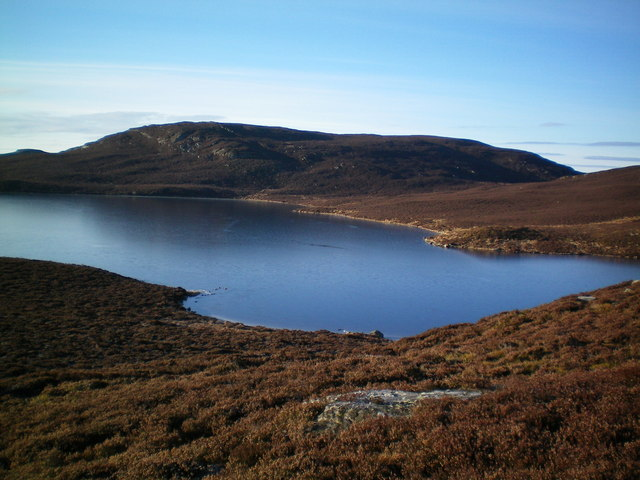
Loch Skiach and Craig Lochie
