= Loch Tilt =

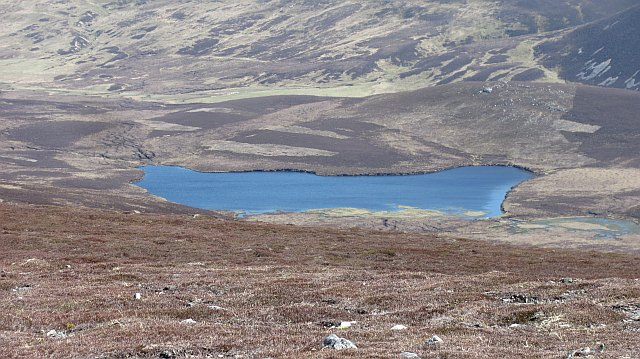
- Considered a large body of water in that part of the Grampian Mountains. The loch is not visible from the famous Glen Tilt Mounth road below.

- Location within Perth and Kinross
- Location: NN992827, Perth and Kinross
- Coordinates: 56.924700°N 3.656900°W
- Type: Freshwater loch
- Basin countries: Scotland
- Max. length: 0.482 km (0.300 mi)
- Max. width: 0.321 km (0.199 mi)
- Surface area: 7.5 ha (19 acres)
- Average depth: 2.5 ft (0.76 m)
- Max. depth: 5 ft (1.5 m)
- Water volume: 1,839,000 ft^{3} (52,100 m^{3})
- Shore length^{1}: 1.4 km (0.87 mi)
- Surface elevation: 504 m (1,654 ft)
- Max. temperature: 54 °F (12 °C)
- Islands: 0
- ^{1} Shore length is not a well-defined measure.

Loch Tilt is a small mountain freshwater loch that sits at the end of Glen Tilt and is located in north-east Perth and Kinross, Scotland. Loch Tilt has a north to south orientation. Loch Tilt is located 10 miles southwest of Braemar.
