= Lochan Sròn Smeur =

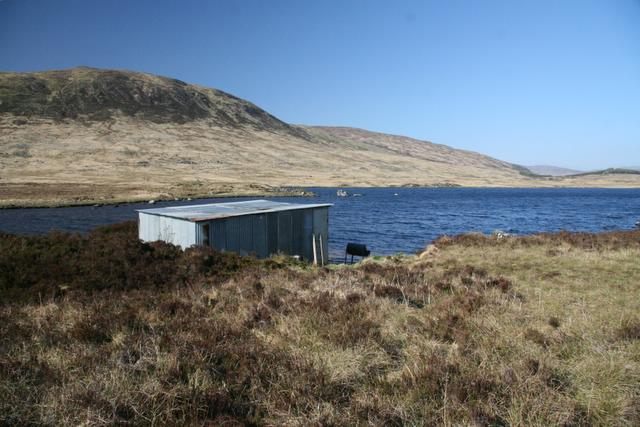
- Boathouse on the shore of Lochan Sron Smeur Sron Smeur is the name of the hill nearby and possibly means outcrop (sron ) of the blackberry (smeur).

- Location within Perth and Kinross
- Coordinates: 56.711700°N 4.536100°W
- Type: freshwater loch
- Max. length: 0.804 km (0.500 mi)
- Max. width: 0.40 km (0.25 mi)
- Surface area: 19.5 ha (48 acres)
- Average depth: 10.3 ft (3.1 m)
- Max. depth: 33 ft (10 m)
- Shore length^{1}: 2.2 km (1.4 mi)
- Surface elevation: 346 m (1,135 ft)
- ^{1} Shore length is not a well-defined measure.

Lochan Sròn Smeur is an upland loch in Tayside, Scotland.
