= Loch Dochart =

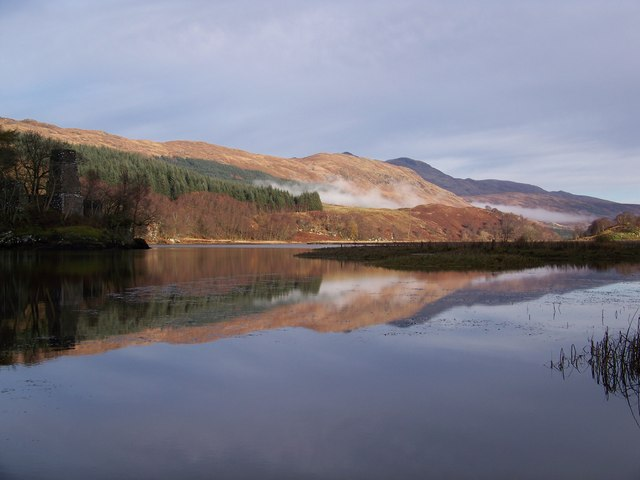

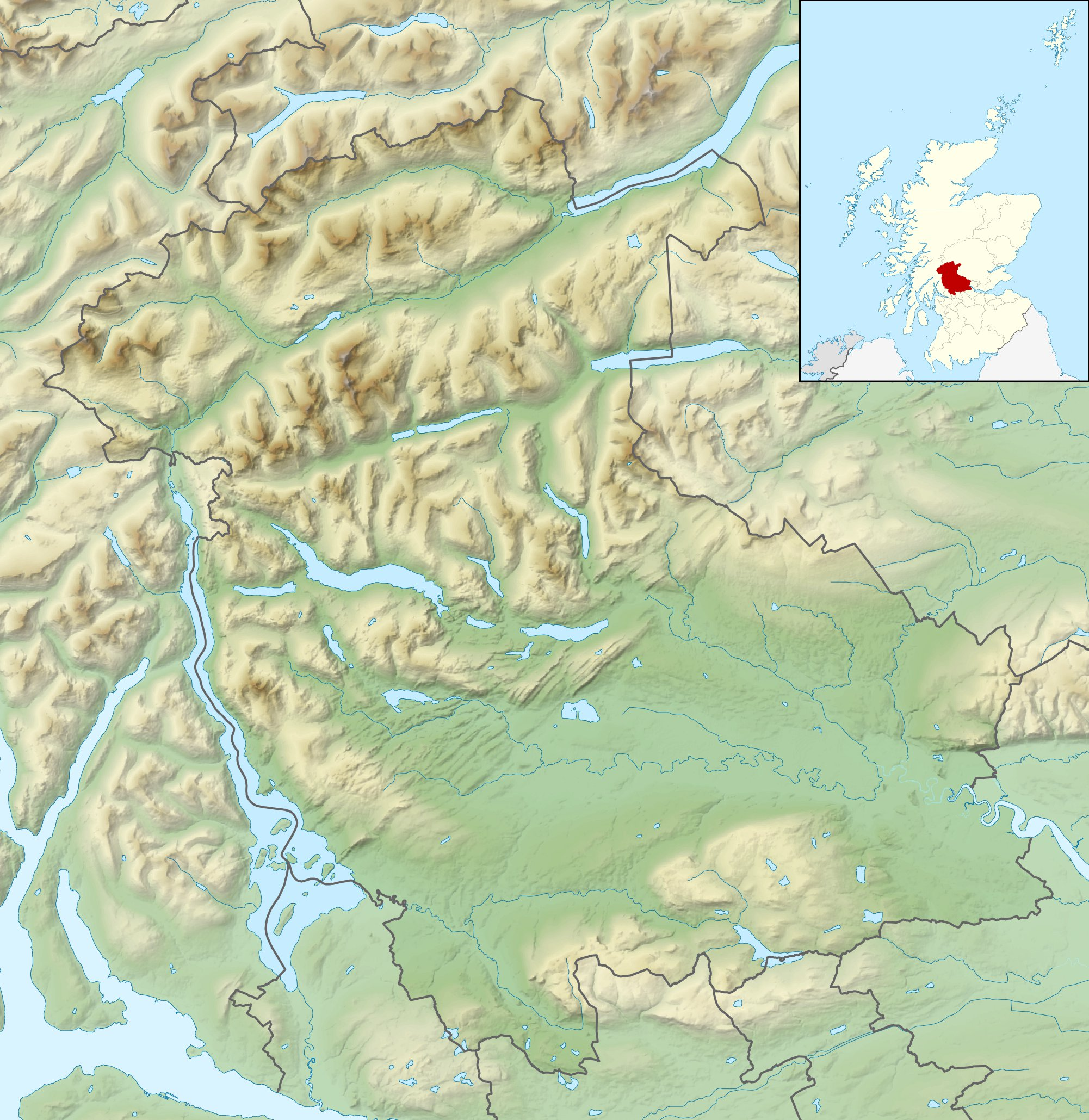
- Location within Stirling
- Location: Perthshire, Scotland
- Coordinates: 56°23′47″N 4°35′3″W
- Type: freshwater loch
- Primary inflows: River Fillan
- Primary outflows: River Dochart
- Basin countries: Scotland
- Max. length: 1.06 km (0.66 mi)
- Max. width: 0.26 km (0.16 mi)
- Surface area: 19 ha (46 acres)
- Average depth: 1.5 m (5 ft)
- Max. depth: 3.4 m (11 ft)
- Water volume: 284,100 m^{3} (10,032,000 ft^{3})
- Surface elevation: 156 m (513 ft)
- Islands: 1 islet

Loch Dochart is a small freshwater loch on the Lochdochart Estate in Stirling, Scottish Highlands. It lies approximately 1.7 km (1.1 mi) to the east of the town of Crianlarich at the foot of Ben More. There is a small wooded island in the middle of the loch on which stands the ruins of a castle originally built by Sir Duncan Campbell between 1583 and 1631.

The loch was surveyed on 11 May, 1902 by T.N. Johnston and James Parsons and later charted as part of Sir John Murray's The Bathymetrical Survey of Fresh-Water Lochs of Scotland 1897-1909.
