= Loch Kennard =

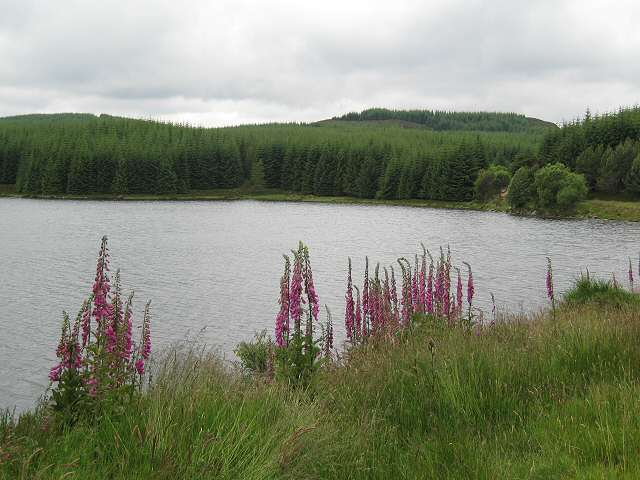
- Foxgloves by Loch Kennard. A track runs along the northern edge of this loch deep within Griffin Forest

- Location within Perth and Kinross
- Location: NN907460
- Coordinates: 56.5933°N 3.7815°W
- Type: freshwater loch
- Primary outflows: Ballinloan Burn
- Max. length: 1.0621 km (0.6600 mi)
- Max. width: 0.53 km (0.33 mi)
- Surface area: 30.1 ha (74 acres)
- Average depth: 32.25 ft (9.83 m)
- Max. depth: 72 ft (22 m)
- Water volume: 108,439,000 ft^{3} (3,070,700 m^{3})
- Shore length^{1}: 2.9 km (1.8 mi)
- Surface elevation: 407 m (1,335 ft)
- Max. temperature: 56.7 °F (13.7 °C)
- Min. temperature: 45.3 °F (7.4 °C)
- ^{1} Shore length is not a well-defined measure.

Loch Kennard is a freshwater loch located south-east of Aberfeldy, situated on Grandtully Hill in Perth and Kinross within Griffin Forest in Scotland.

== Geography ==
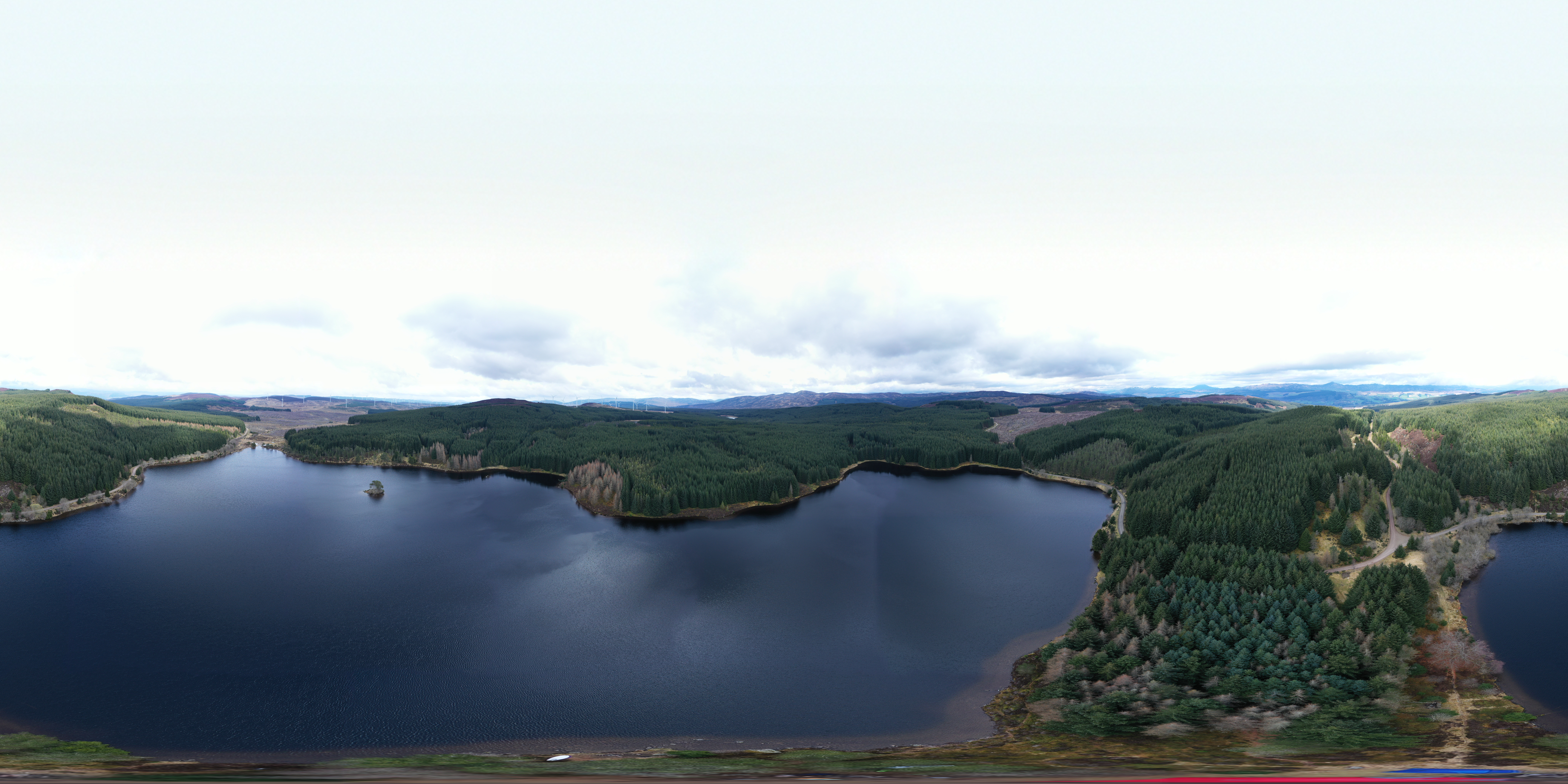
360 degree panoramic view of the Loch, showing the shoreline and location of the island

Loch Kennard is located within and surrounded Griffin Forest and is one of a handful of small lochs within the forest that are popular with walkers. On the east shore of the loch lies the remains of an old boatshed. An accompanying Loch Kennard Lodge, that was constructed in 1870 for wealthy fishing parties, was removed when Griffin Forest was planted.

== Island ==
Loch Kennard contains a small island, almost circular, measuring some 18m long, north to the south bearing, by 16m wide, and possibly artificial, although not a crannog. The island contains the ruins of a building measuring some 1.7m high, 6.3m long, on a bearing of east to west bearing, by 3.4m wide, with walls almost 0.7m thick. The purpose of the building is unknown.
