= Rannoch Barracks =

Military barracks in Perth and Kinross, Scotland

- Bridge of Gaur
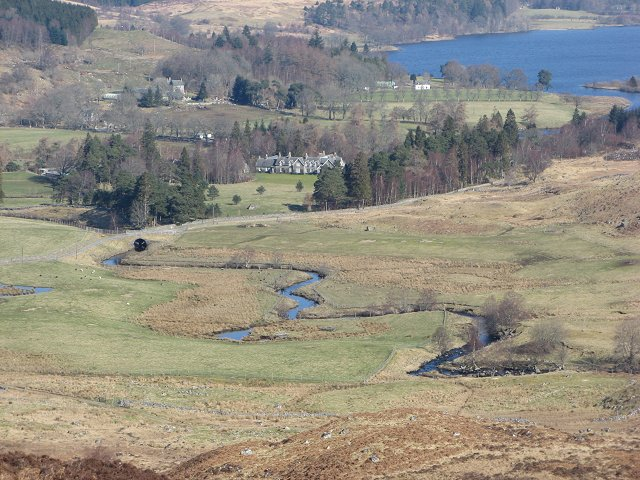
- The modern Rannoch Barracks at the west end of Loch Rannoch

Site information
- Type: Barracks
- Owner: Baron Pearson of Rannoch

Location
- Location within Perth and Kinross
- Coordinates: 56°40′39″N 04°27′01″W

Site history
- Built: 1746
- In use: 1746–1798

Rannoch Barracks was a British Army cantonment constructed in 1746 at the western end of Loch Rannoch, Perthshire, Scotland. The military settlement was built in the aftermath of the Jacobite uprising of 1745. It was used as a base from which patrols would be sent out to find and capture rebels as well as police the area for brigands and cattle thieves.

The original barrack buildings, which are near to the church and deserted hamlet of Bridge of Gaur (Braes of Rannoch), were where Hector Munro brought the Jacobite rebel John Du Cameron after his capture in the Raid on Rannoch.

The present-day Rannoch Barracks is the Scottish residence of Baron Pearson of Rannoch, a British businessman and a former leader of the UK Independence Party (UKIP). It is situated on a 6,000-acre (2,400 ha) estate that has a shooting lodge named after the former barracks.

== Barracks ==
The barracks were built in 1746 in response to the Jacobite uprisings, and to overawe the Robertson clan, though, by a strange quirk of fate, they would later become the residence of the chief. Following the defeat of the Jacobites at Culloden (1746), "Butcher" Cumberland ordered his troops to show no quarter to any remaining Jacobite rebels. The Hanoverian Army (known as "Redcoats") then embarked upon the so-called "pacification" of Jacobite areas of the Highlands. Numerous barracks were constructed throughout the Highlands to house the Government troops, including one at the head of Loch Rannoch at Braes of Rannoch (now called Bridge of Gaur). It is likely that it was a thatched-roof construction, more quarters than castle.

Rannoch's clans had played a full part in the Jacobite risings. All those the troops believed to be rebels were killed, as were some non-combatants. "Rebellious" settlements were burned and livestock was confiscated on a large scale.

When the reprisals ceased, the warriors returned. However, without crops or cattle, there seemed no alternative open to them but thieving, and sheer hunger drove them to commit savage deeds. A Captain Patton of Guise's Regiment said, "the people of this country [Rannoch] are the greatest thieves in Scotland and were all in the late rebellion, except for a few. They have a great number of arms but they keep them concealed from us."

Places such as Banff, Aberdeen, Angus and the Mearns suffered from the depredations of the thieves of Rannoch. In the 1747, a band of Rannoch thieves was intercepted and forty head of cattle were recovered from them. There are dozens of similar reports which gave a fair indication of the problems facing the soldiers.

The infamous Sergeant Mhor (the great Sergeant), an ex-soldier who led one of the gangs, was held in Rannoch Barracks before being taken to Perth where he was condemned as a thief and executed. He protested his innocence saying he had "never killed a man but in self-defence: that he never took what was not his own, except a sheep from the hills, to give him and his food."

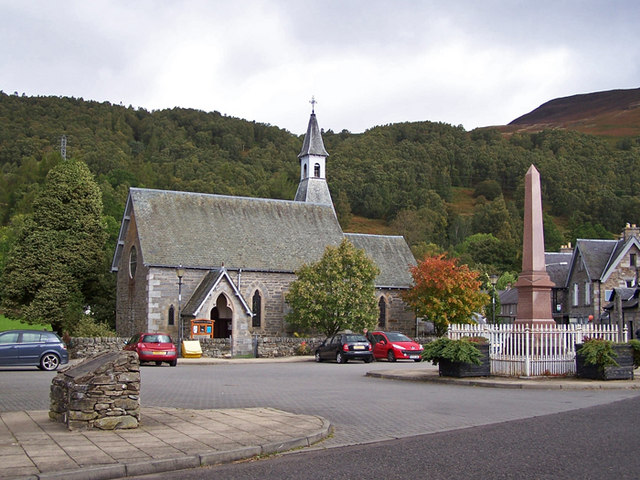
Buchanan Memorial in Kinloch Rannoch

The soldiers struggled to cope with the lawlessness and aimed to bring peace to the area. Dugald Buchanan (1716–1768), a teacher and an evangelist, preaching at large open air meetings, which upwards of 500 people attended, showing great courage as he persuaded the "wild men" to give up their lawlessness and savage ways. He and his wife taught them new trades and crafts. They worked with James Small, an older brother of Major-General John Small and formerly an Ensign in Lord Loudoun's Regiment, who had been appointed by the Commissioners for the Forfeited Estates to run the Rannoch estates, which had been seized from the clan chieftains who had supported the Jacobites. The tiny hamlet at the east end of Loch Rannoch, now known as Kinloch Rannoch, was enlarged and settled, mainly by soldiers being discharged from the army, but also by displaced crofters.

A wide range of agricultural and other improvement works were undertaken across the estates, including drainage, road making and bridge building. The Soldier's Trenches on Rannoch Moor as seen from the West Highland Line date from this period. Slowly peace and prosperity were brought to Rannoch. Flax and potatoes were introduced, mills built and spinning and weaving taught; a mason, joiner and wheelwright passed on their skills; a shoemaker and tailor set up business.

Buchanan is commemorated by a monument erected in The Square at Kinloch Rannoch and by the first Church built at the Braes of Rannoch, or Georgetown as it was known at the time, named after the King George II. This latter name was swiftly changed again after the Redcoats' withdrawal from the area.

The main building was converted from a barracks into a shooting lodge between 1798 and 1803.

The first church in Bridge of Gaur was built a few hundred yards west of the current church in 1776. This was replaced by a church on the present site in 1855, until it in turn was replaced by the current church in 1907. The flagstones on the chancel floor in the church are from one of the early churches.

No one knows why the two earlier churches were replaced, and the only reminder of the original church is the bellcote, which was moved to each of its replacements in turn. The Rev Archibald Eneas Robertson (1870–1958), first ascender of all the Munros (hills in Scotland over 3,000 ft), was minister here between 1907 and 1920.
