= Loch Fender =

Loch in Perth and Kinross, Scotland

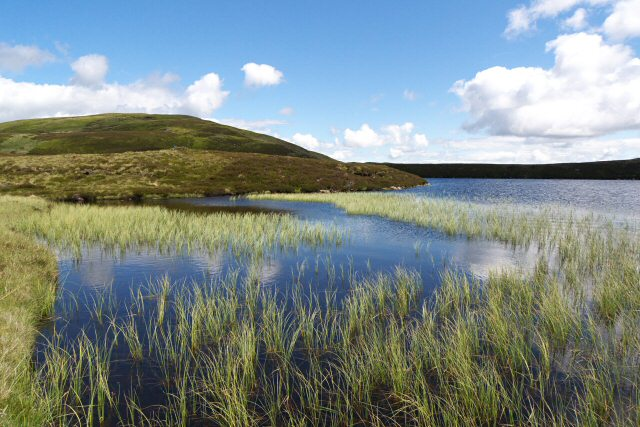
- Meall Dearg rises above the loch 1 Km away.

- Location within Perth and Kinross
- Location: NN87904131
- Coordinates: 56.55039978°N 3.82493972°W
- Type: freshwater loch
- Max. length: 0.48 km (0.30 mi)
- Max. width: 0.40 km (0.25 mi)
- Surface area: 9 ha (22 acres)
- Average depth: 31.82 ft (9.70 m)
- Max. depth: 78 ft (24 m)
- Water volume: 30,998,000 ft^{3} (877,800 m^{3})
- Shore length^{1}: 1 km (0.62 mi)
- Surface elevation: 578 m (1,896 ft)
- Max. temperature: 42.4 °F (5.8 °C)
- Min. temperature: 36 °F (2 °C)
- Islands: 0
- ^{1} Shore length is not a well-defined measure.

Loch Fender is a small irregular shaped freshwater loch that lies to the north of Loch Freuchie and three miles south-south-east of Amulree and 2 1/2 miles from southeast from Milton in Perth and Kinross. For its size it is very deep.

== Geography ==
Loch Fender lies midway between Glen Quaich and Glen Cochill in a bowl formed between two small hills, at the top of Glen Fender.

== See also ==
- List of lochs in Scotland
