= Raid on Rannoch =

- Part of the aftermath of the Jacobite rising of 1745
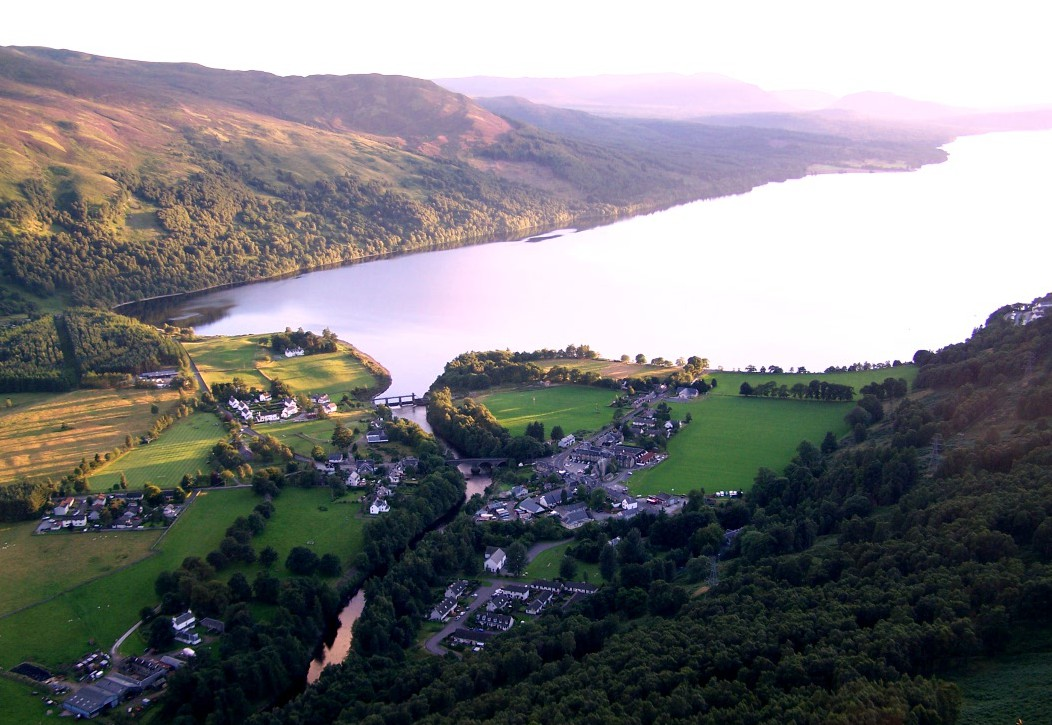
- The village of Kinloch Rannoch, the ruined Rannoch Barracks are nearby where the Jacobite John Dubh Cameron was held before being executed
Date	1753
Location	Dunan, Rannoch, Scotland
Result	British-Hanoverian Government victory

Belligerents
(Kingdom of Great Britain) British Government; 34th (Cumberland) Regiment of Foot	Jacobites

Commanders and leaders
(Kingdom of Great Britain) Lieutenant Hector Munro	Sergeant John Dubh Cameron

Casualties and losses
None	John Dubh Cameron captured and executed

The Raid on Rannoch took place in 1753 in the tumultuous aftermath of the Jacobite rising of 1745. Lieutenant Hector Munro, 8th laird of Novar who was a commissioned officer in the 34th (Cumberland) Regiment of Foot led the raid to capture the Jacobite rebel John Dubh Cameron who was later executed.

== Background ==
In June 1753 another more important member of the Clan Cameron, Archibald Cameron of Lochiel, who was the clan chief's brother, had been captured and executed for having supported the Jacobite rising. John Dubh Cameron having no fixed abode and facing the consequences of having served in the French army and also of having supported the Jacobite rising, formed a party of freebooters, and took up his residence in the mountains between the counties of Perth, Inverness and Argyll. He carried on a system of spoliation by carrying off cattle that belonged to people he called his enemies, and also blackmailing people. In the aftermath of the Jacobite rising the district of Rannoch was described as being in a sad state with people starving and with the returning warriors having no option but to resort to thieving. There were soldiers who had been established at the Rannoch Barracks who were everywhere searching for the rebel leaders and trying to curb and capture the thieves. Lieutenant Hector Munro of Novar received special instructions to apprehend the rebel John Dubh Cameron who was better known as Sergeant Mor.

== Raid on Rannoch ==
Lieutenant Munro marched a strong force of soldiers through Rannoch. Cameron had for a long time slept in a barn on the farm of Dunan in Rannoch, but he was betrayed one night while he was asleep in the barn, in the year 1753, although historian Alexander Mackenzie gives the year of 1754. Cameron was apprehended by a party of men led by Lieutenant Hector Munro. Cameron was a powerful man and shook off all of the soldiers who had hold of him and attempted to escape. However, he was overpowered by the remainder of the party who had stayed outside. Cameron was held at Rannoch Barracks, before being carried to Perth where he was tried for murder as well as for various acts of theft and cattle stealing. He was found guilty and executed at Perth on 23 November 1753. It was generally believed locally that Cameron had been betrayed by the man whose barn he had been sleeping in.

== Aftermath ==
The man who had betrayed Cameron apparently had to flee the country. By 1754 peace was beginning to reign in Rannoch. Lieutenant Munro was also tasked with the apprehension of the Jacobite Ewen MacPherson of Cluny. However, in 1755, after nine years of playing hide and seek in the mountains of Badenoch, MacPherson managed to elude Munro's grasp and escaped to France.

== See also ==
- Battle of Culloden
- Jacobite rising of 1745
- Donald Cameron of Lochiel
