= John Stuart (Presbyterian minister) =

John Stuart FRSE MWS (also spelt Stewart or Steuart, Scottish Gaelic: Iain Stiubhairt) (1743–1821) was a Scottish minister, Gaelic scholar, and reviser of the New Testament in Gaelic of his father James Stuart of Killin.

John Stuart's revised Gaelic New Testament was published in 1796 with a print run of 21,500 copies. He was the main translator of the Old Testament in Gaelic which was published in 1801.

== Life ==
He was born on 31 July 1743 at Killin manse, the son of the Rev James Stuart and his wife, Elizabeth Drummond.

He was licensed as a Church of Scotland minister by the presbytery of Edinburgh on 27 February 1771, and was presented to the congregation of Arrochar by Sir James Colquhoun in October 1773, and was ordained on 12 May 1774. He was translated to Weem on 26 March 1776, and to Luss on 1 July 1777.

In 1783 he was a founding Fellow of the Royal Society of Edinburgh. He received an honorary doctorate D.D. from Glasgow University in 1795.

Stuart died in Luss manse on 24 May 1821 and is buried there.

== Works ==
Stuart was a Gaelic scholar. His father had already translated the New Testament into Gaelic, and at the time of his death had begun a translation of the Old Testament. This work was continued by his son, and the complete translation was published at Edinburgh in 1767, under the auspices of the Society in Scotland for Propagating Christian Knowledge; another edition was published in London in 1807. John Stuart also assisted the publication of the Gaelic poems of Duncan Ban MacIntyre. For his services as translator he received from the Lords of the Treasury £1,000 in 1820, and the thanks of the General Assembly of the Church of Scotland were conveyed to him from the chair, Very Rev Thomas MacKnight, on 28 May 1819.

Stuart studied natural history and botany, attending John Hope's classes in Linnaean Botany at the University of Edinburgh in 1766. In 1772, he accompanied Thomas Pennant on his Tour in Scotland and Voyage to the Hebrides, providing the author with information on natural history, the Gaelic language and Highland customs. He also assisted Rev. John Lightfoot with the preparation of his Flora Scotica (1777).

He was the author of "The Account of the Parish of Luss" in vol. xvii. of Sir John Sinclair's Statistical Account of Scotland.

== Family ==
On 24 July 1792 he married Susan McIntyre, daughter of Rev Dr Joseph McIntyre of Glenorchy. She died on 7 July 1846, leaving a son, Joseph McIntyre, later minister of Kingarth, and a daughter.

His brother-in-law was James McLagan, minister of Amulrie in Perthshire, and author of Spiritual views of the divine government 1831.
