= James MacLagan =

James McLagan
- Born: 8 September 1728; Ballechin, Perthshire, Scotland
- Died: 3 May 1805 (aged 76); Blair Atholl, Scotland
- Education: University of St Andrews (no degree)
- Occupations: Folklorist, minister
- Spouse: Catherine Stuart
- Writing career
- Language: Scottish Gaelic, English

James MacLagan or McLagan (Scottish Gaelic: Seumas MacLathagain; 1728–1805) was a Church of Scotland minister and collector of Scottish Gaelic poetry and song. His manuscript collection, known as the McLagan Collection, comprises some 250 manuscripts of primarily Gaelic song and poetry collected in the second half of the eighteenth century. The collection includes works by many of the best-known 17th- and 18th-century Gaelic poets such as Iain Lom, Màiri nighean Alasdair Ruaidh and Alasdair mac Mhaighstir Alasdair.

== Life and career ==
McLagan was born in 1728 at the Ballechin estate near Strathtay, Perthshire. A son of Donald McClagon, a farmer, his birth (or baptism) is recorded in the parish of Moulin, Perthshire, on 8 September 1728. In 1750, he matriculated at the University of St Andrews in the 1750/51 session. It is not known what he studied or when he left, but he is subsequently recorded as being ordained in the Church of Scotland by the presbytery of Dunkeld on 6 February 1760. His first position as minister was at the chapel of ease in Amulree, Perthshire, between 1760 and 1764.

He left Perthshire in 1764 when he was appointed chaplain to the 42nd Regiment of Foot, the Black Watch, which had originally been raised at Aberfeldy, Perthshire. He succeeded Adam Ferguson, later professor of philosophy at the University of Edinburgh, in this post. He continued as chaplain with the regiment until 1788 during which time he served in the Isle of Man, Ireland and in the United States where the regiment was involved in the American War of Independence. The freedom of the city Glasgow was conferred on him 5 April 1776.

He did not spend all of the time he was employed with the regiment in their company, as on 7 June 1784, he married Catherine Stuart, daughter of James Stuart, the minister of Killin who worked on the translation of the New Testament into Scottish Gaelic. She was half her husband's age in 1784, and they had a family of four sons and three daughters. Their eldest son, also James, was minister of Kinfauns Parish Church, became professor of divinity at King's College, Aberdeen, and authored Spiritual Views of the Divine Government (1831).

After leaving the Black Watch in 1788, he became minister of Blair Atholl and Strowan, Perthshire, and stayed there until his death. In the Statistical Accounts of Scotland of 1792, he authored the section covering the parish of Blair Atholl and Strowan in which he voiced warnings about the perceptible weakening of Gaelic in that area.

McLagan died at Blair Atholl on 3 May 1805.

== Poetry ==
He composed poetry in Scottish Gaelic. published in Gillies collection and MacPhàrlain.

== Poetry Collection and the 'McLagan Manuscripts' ==
The Oxford Dictionary of National Biography describes the manuscript collection amassed by McLagan as his "great achievement". The collection was donated to the University of Glasgow in 1910 and is now housed in the University of Glasgow Library Special Collections.

The collection contains 250 manuscripts with some 630 separate items which were collected or transcribed by McLagan, mainly in Scottish Gaelic along with items in Middle Irish, English and Latin. They are largely anonymous and ascribed verse, with a small number of prose items, sourced from many areas of Highland Scotland and also from Ireland and the Isle of Man. John Mackechnie's Catalogue of Gaelic Manuscripts (1973) notes that there are at least 47 different hands represented in the collection. In many instances these manuscripts contain the earliest, or the only, examples of particular poems or songs, and, in the view of Professor of Celtic Derick S. Thomson, they provide "a highly valuable source".

McLagan began collecting the Ossianic ballads of Scottish Gaelic while still at school. McLagan's material was drawn partly from Perthshire sources, including some manuscripts which are older than 1750. He also used his contacts, both ministerial and military, to acquire versions of poems and songs from other parts of Gaelic Scotland, such as Argyll with its islands, Ross-shire, Inverness-shire, Skye and the outer isles, and districts in Aberdeenshire and elsewhere that were still Gaelic-speaking in his time. According to Derick S. Thomson, McLagan likely provided some material for John Gillies' Clan Feuds and Songs (1780), and he was closely involved with the same publisher's book of 1786, known generally as the Gillies Collection.

His contemporaries in poetry and song collection included Jerome Stone, a teacher in Dunkeld, Donald MacNicol, Church of Scotland minister of Lismore, Joseph Macintyre from Glenorchy, Archibald MacArthur from Glenlyon, and John Stuart, Church of Scotland minister of Killin (his brother-in-law).

=== Ossianic Ballads ===
In October 1760, while McLagan was minister of Amulree, he was contacted by James Macpherson, the famous publisher of Fragments of Ancient Poetry collected in the Highlands of Scotland and subject of the Ossian controversy. The next year, Macpherson wrote to MacLagan twice to thank him for sending him on some poems. In 1800 McLagan recalled that he had given Macpherson ‘about thirteen poems’.

== See also ==
- Charles O'Conor (historian)
