= Glenalmond =

Valley of the River Almond in Perth and Kinross, Scotland

Coordinates: 56.435°N 3.701°W

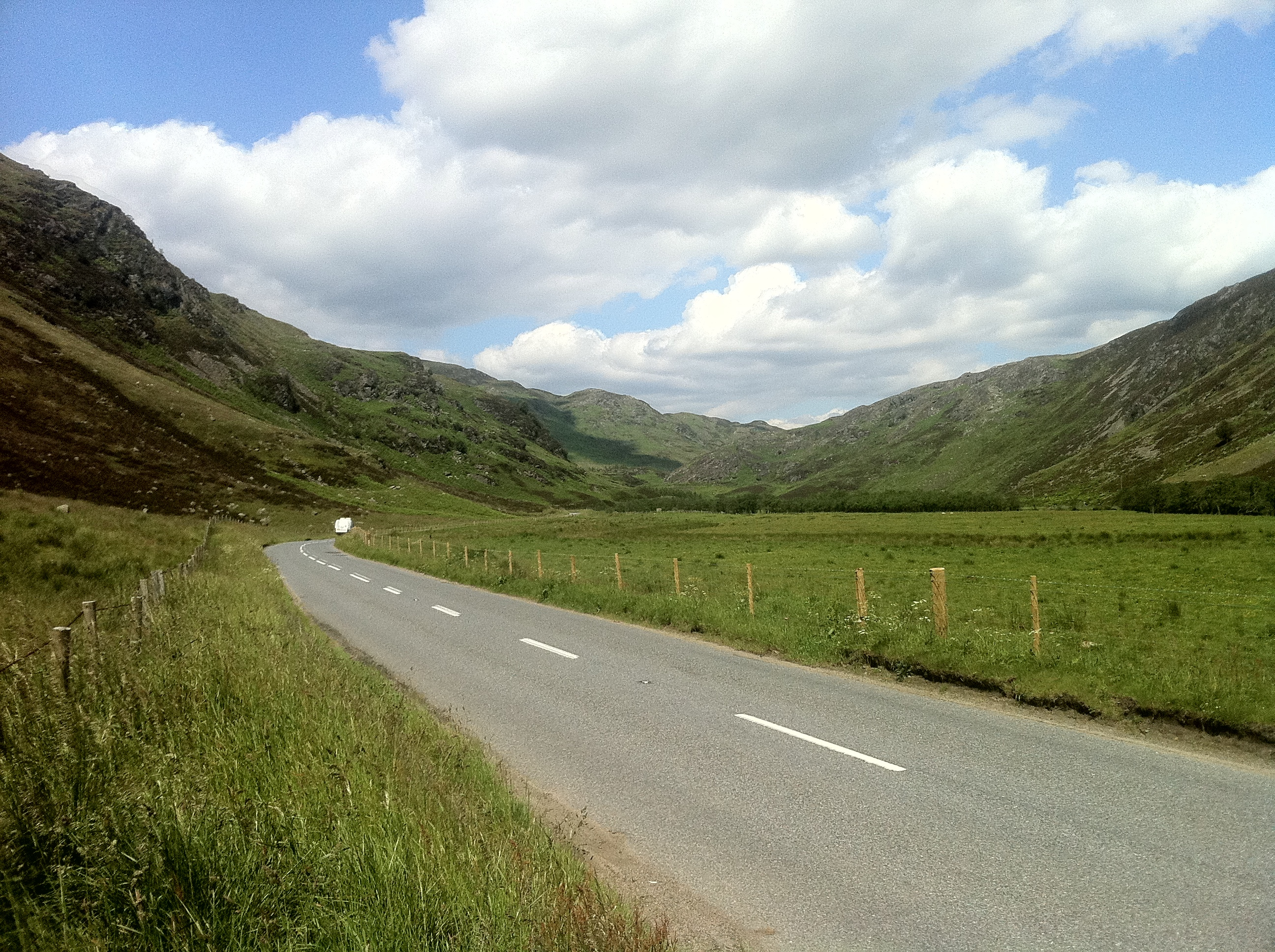
Sma' Glen

Glenalmond or Glen Almond (Scottish Gaelic: Gleann Amain /ɡlaun̪ˠ ˈamɛn/) is a glen which stretches for 40 km to the west of the city of Perth in Perth and Kinross, Scotland and down which the River Almond flows. 'Almond' is an old Brittonic word for river, with no connection to the nut.

The upper half of the glen runs through bare mountainous country and is virtually uninhabited whilst the lower, easterly section of the glen is gentler terrain, well-wooded with some rich agricultural land. The change in character takes place as the river crosses the Highland Boundary Fault, leaving the Grampian Highlands for the Central Lowlands. The River Almond enters the River Tay just north of Perth.

The head of Glen Almond is dominated by the Shee of Ardtalnaig (~750 m), an island hill flanked by glacial breaches cut by ice overflowing from the upper Tay basin. This may account for one of the largest and densest clusters of Rock Slope Failures in Britain, with 33 RSFs at an average size of 0.20 sq km, the most dramatic towering above Conichan. The lower of these two passes is followed by the Rob Roy Way through to Ardtalnaig on Loch Tay. Although the glaciated upper valley is steep-sided, it cuts through moorlands which rise gently to Ben Chonzie on the south, the only 'Munro' (931m), and the 'Corbett' Creagan na Beinne (888m) on the north. Midway down the upper glen, a remarkably bold ravine cuts NE from Auchnafree through Glen Lochan to Glen Quaich; it is lined with large RSFs.

A short middle section of Glen Almond takes a NW-SE dogleg down to the Highland Boundary, and is known as the Sma' Glen, (Scottish Gaelic: Caol Ghlinn Amain - caol meaning a narrow place). The A822 road takes advantage of this deeply incised section of the glen to forge a route between Crieff and Strathbran, much as General Wade's Military Road did in the middle of the eighteenth century. The stretch of the river from Newton Bridge to Connachan Lodge is lined by ancient alders, evidence of coppice management over many centuries.

Lower Glenalmond is the location for Glenalmond College, a private boarding school.
