= Garrow, Perth and Kinross =

Settlement in Scotland

Garrow: Scottish Gaelic: Garbhach
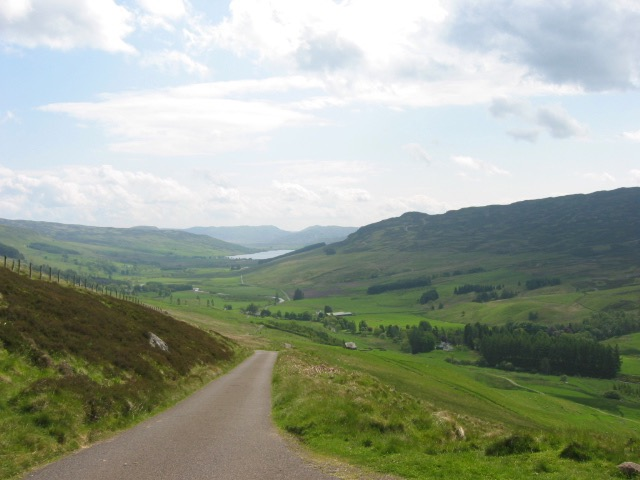
- View from just above Garrow, looking southeast to Loch Freuchie

- Location within Perth and Kinross
- Council area: Perth and Kinross
- Lieutenancy area: Perth and Kinross
- Country: Scotland
- Sovereign state: United Kingdom
- Post town: Aberfeldy
- Postcode district: PH
- Police: Scotland
- Fire: Scottish
- Ambulance: Scottish

Garrow is a clachan in the Breadalbane region of Perth and Kinross, Scotland. It is located about midway between Kenmore, 4.5 miles (7.2 kilometres) to the northwest, and Amulree, 5.3 mi (8.5 km) to the southeast. It sits below the River Quaich, which flows into nearby Loch Freuchie, itself situated between Garrow and Amulree, 2.3 mi (3.7 km) away. Garrow's elevation is about 314 metres (1,030 feet).

Garrow Bridge, a single segmental arch bridge that crosses the River Quaich, is a Category C listed structure dating to the early 19th century.

Garrow Hill, which rises to 732 m (2,402 ft), stands to the south of Garrow.

Robert Burns passed through Garrow during his tour of the Highlands in the summer of 1787.

== Gallery ==
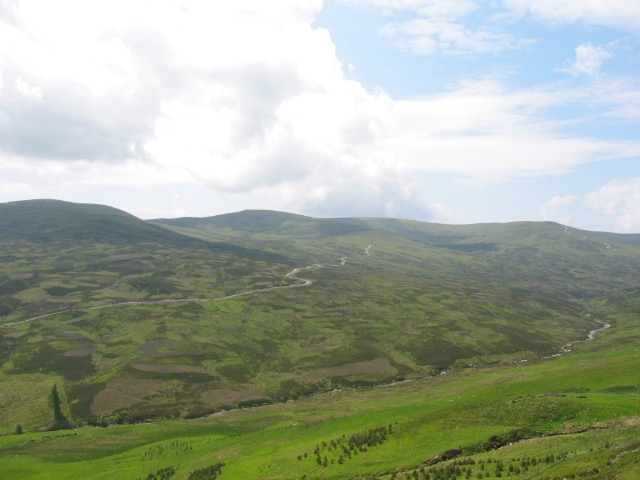
Looking south across the River Quaich towards Garrow Hill

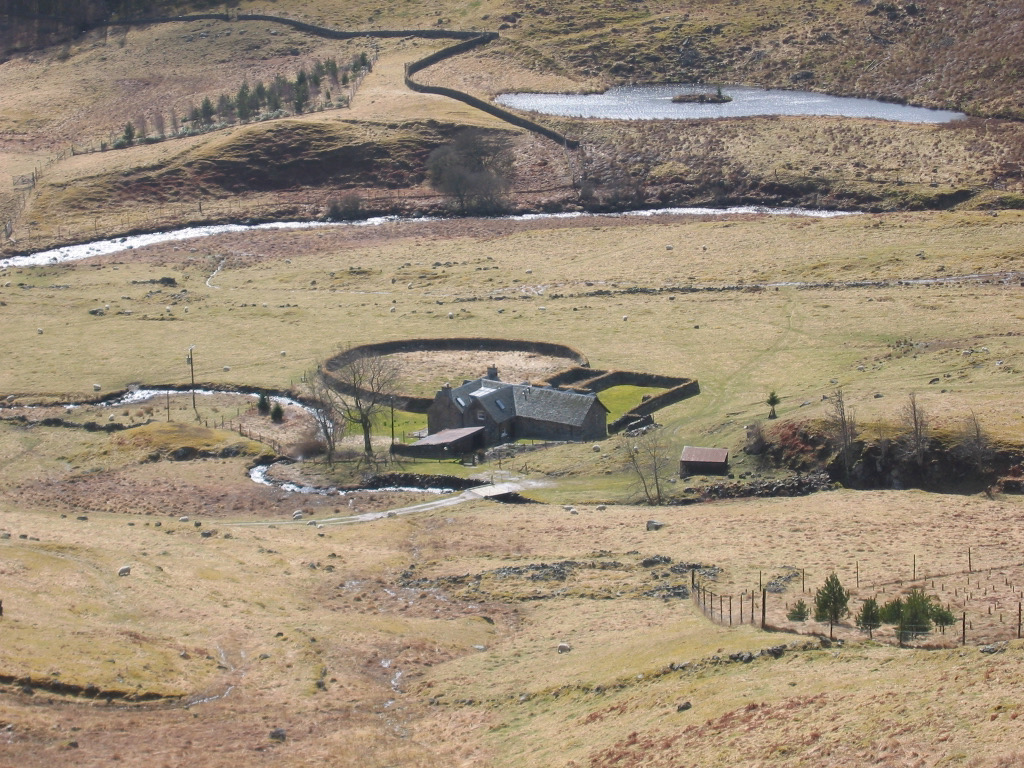
A farmstead standing between the river and a stream
