= Kinloch Rannoch =

Coordinates: 56.701°N 4.186°W

Kinloch Rannoch: Scottish Gaelic: Ceann Loch Raineach
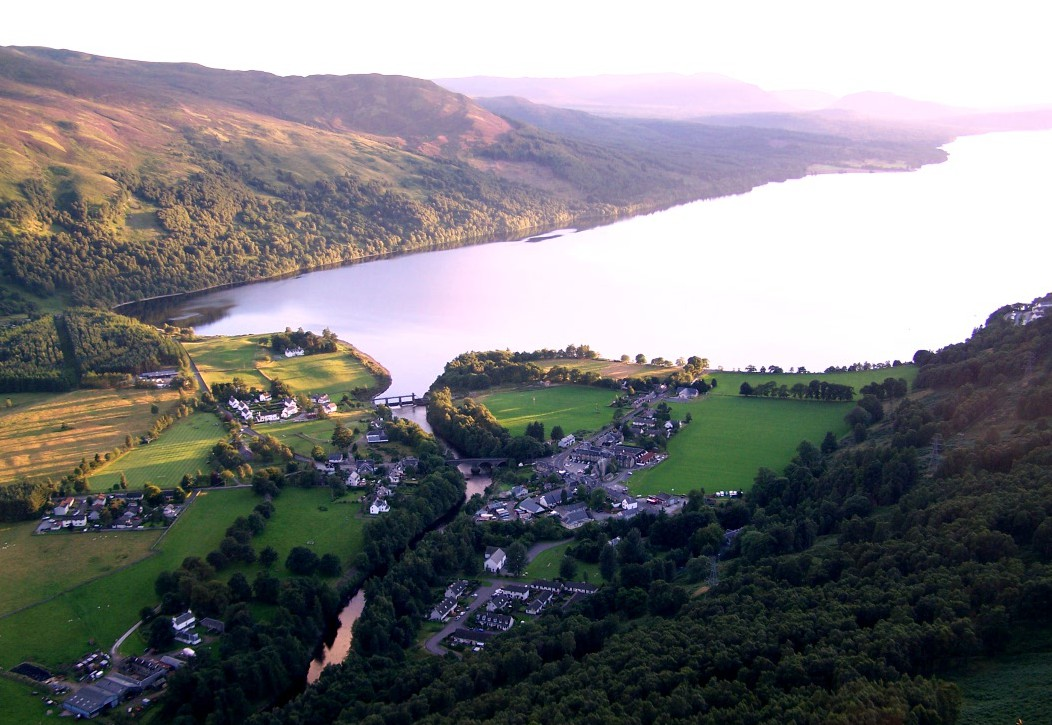

- Location within Perth and Kinross
- OS grid reference: NN662586
- Council area: Perth and Kinross
- Country: Scotland
- Sovereign state: United Kingdom
- Post town: PITLOCHRY
- Postcode district: PH16
- Dialling code: 01882 Some newer numbers are given with a Pitlochry code of 01796
- Police: Scotland
- Fire: Scottish
- Ambulance: Scottish
- UK Parliament: Angus and Perthshire Glens
- Scottish Parliament: Perthshire North

Kinloch Rannoch (/ˌkɪnlɒx ˈrænəx/; Scottish Gaelic: Ceann Loch Raineach) is a village in Perth and Kinross, Scotland, at the eastern end of Loch Rannoch, 18 miles (29 km) west of Pitlochry, on the banks of the River Tummel. The village is a tourist and outdoor pursuits centre. It has a small population and is fairly remote.

The name of the village, Kinloch Rannoch, or rather Ceann Loch means 'end' of the loch. It could be used for either end, but is usually used for the end the water flows out of in a fresh water loch such as this, in contrast to a sea loch where the brine hits the land. On the road to Rannoch Station is the church of A. E. Robertson at Braes of Rannoch.

== Overview ==
Formerly a tiny hamlet, Kinloch Rannoch was enlarged and settled, under the direction of James Small, formerly an Ensign in Lord Loudoun's Regiment, mainly by soldiers discharged from the army, but also by displaced crofters. Small had been appointed by the Commissioners for the Forfeited Estates to run the Rannoch estates, which had been seized from the clan chieftains who had supported the Jacobites following the Battle of Culloden in 1746. Local roads and bridges were improved, enabling soldiers at Rannoch Barracks to move more freely around the district. The Soldiers' Trenches were dug on nearby Rannoch Moor in an unsuccessful attempt to create better quality agricultural land.

Small was supported by Dugald Buchanan and his wife who taught the villagers new trades and crafts. Buchanan was a local schoolmaster and Gaelic poet, who is commemorated by a large monument in the centre of the square in Kinloch Rannoch. He worked with James Stuart minister of Killin on translating Bible passages into Scottish Gaelic.

The main economic activities in the area are agriculture, forestry, hydro power and tourism with local tourist activities including fishing, rafting, cycling and hiking.

Near the village is a hill reputed to resemble the head, shoulders, and torso of a man. It has been given the name of "The Sleeping Giant". Local myth says that the giant will wake up only when he hears the sounds of his master's flute.

The old bridge over the River Tummel is worthy of note. Some sources attribute it to Thomas Telford but that is unlikely since a plaque on the bridge dates its building to 1764 when Telford would have been 7 years old.

There is also has an attractive waterfall at the entrance to the village on the Allt Mor burn known locally as The Falls and there is a walkway to the hill giving access to Craig Var an imposing craggy outcrop jutting into the valley and offering stupendous views over the village and nearby lochs and hills.

The village and some of its inhabitants were featured in the film Shepherd on the Rock.

== Gallery ==
Photos of Kinloch Rannoch
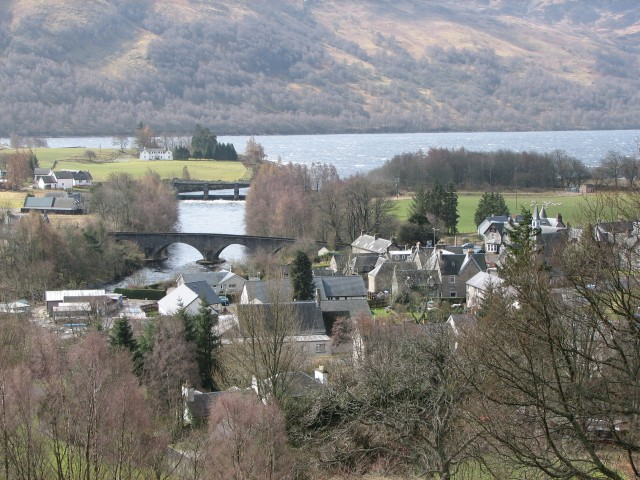
A photo shot of village buildings and River Tummel from low altitude.

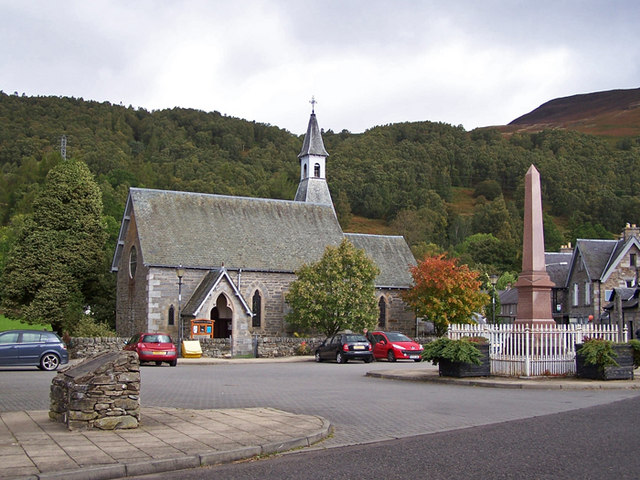
Dugald Buchanan Memorial on right
