= Moss-trooper =

17th-century brigands on the England-Scotland border

Moss Troopers Act 1662
- Act of Parliament
- Parliament of England
- Long title: An Act for preventing of Theft and Rapine upon the Northern Borders of England
- Citation: 14 Cha. 2 c. 22 (Note: This is the citation in The Statutes of the Realm.); 13 & 14 Cha. 2. c. 22 (Note: This is the citation in The Statutes at Large.)
- Territorial extent: England and Wales

Dates
- Royal assent: 19 May 1662
- Commencement: 29 September 1662 (Note: Start of session.)
- Expired: 28 September 1667
- Repealed: 28 July 1863
Other legislation
Amended by	Moss Troopers Act 1666; Moss Troopers Act 1677; Moss Troopers Act 1685; Moss Troopers Act 1695; Moss Troopers Act 1700; Moss Troopers Act 1712; Continuance of Laws, etc. Act 1723; Perpetuation of Various Laws Act 1732; Universities (Wine Licences) Act 1743; Continuance of Laws (No.2) Act 1750; Continuance, etc., of Acts, 1757
Repealed by	Statute Law Revision Act 1863

Status: Repealed

Text of statute as originally enacted

Moss Troopers Act 1666
- Act of Parliament
- Parliament of England
- Long title: An Act to continue a former Act for preventing of Thefte and Rapine upon the Northerne Borders of England.
- Citation: 18 & 19 Cha. 2. c. 3: (Ruffhead: 18 Cha. 2. c. 4)
- Territorial extent: England and Wales

Dates
- Royal assent: 18 January 1667
- Commencement: 21 September 1666
- Expired: 28 September 1673
- Repealed: 28 July 1863
Other legislation
Amends	Moss Troopers Act 1662
Amended by	Moss Troopers Act 1677; Moss Troopers Act 1685; Moss Troopers Act 1695Moss Troopers Act 1700; Moss Troopers Act 1712; Perpetuation of Various Laws Act 1732
Repealed by	Statute Law Revision Act 1863

Status: Repealed

Text of statute as originally enacted

Moss Troopers Act 1677
- Act of Parliament
- Parliament of England
- Long title: An Act for continuance of two former Acts for preventing of Theft and Rapine upon the Northerne Borders of England.
- Citation: 29 & 30 Cha. 2. c. 2
- Territorial extent: England and Wales

Dates
- Royal assent: 20 March 1678
- Commencement: 28 January 1678
- Expired: 2 July 1687
- Repealed: 28 July 1863
Other legislation
Amends	Moss Troopers Act 1662; Moss Troopers Act 1666
Amended by	Moss Troopers Act 1685; Moss Troopers Act 1695; Moss Troopers Act 1700; Moss Troopers Act 1712; Perpetuation of Various Laws Act 1732
Repealed by	Statute Law Revision Act 1863

Status: Repealed

Text of statute as originally enacted

Moss Troopers Act 1685
- Act of Parliament
- Parliament of England
- Long title: An Act for Continuance of Three former Acts for Preventing of Theft and Rapine upon the Northerne Borders of England.
- Citation: 1 Ja. 2. c. 14
- Territorial extent: England and Wales

Dates
- Royal assent: 27 June 1685
- Commencement: 19 March 1604
- Repealed: 28 July 1863
Other legislation
Amends	Moss Troopers Act 1662; Moss Troopers Act 1666; Moss Troopers Act 1677
Amended by	Moss Troopers Act 1695; Moss Troopers Act 1700; Moss Troopers Act 1712
Repealed by	Statute Law Revision Act 1863

Status: Repealed

Text of statute as originally enacted

Moss Troopers Act 1695
- Act of Parliament
- Parliament of England
- Long title: An Act to continue Foure former Acts for preventing Theft and Rapine upon the Northerne Borders of England.
- Citation: 7 & 8 Will. 3. c. 17
- Territorial extent: England and Wales

Dates
- Royal assent: 10 April 1696
- Commencement: 22 November 1695
- Repealed: 15 July 1867
Other legislation
Amends	Moss Troopers Act 1662; Moss Troopers Act 1666; Moss Troopers Act 1677; Moss Troopers Act 1685; Moss Troopers Act 1712
Amended by	Moss Troopers Act 1700
Repealed by	Statute Law Revision Act 1867

Status: Repealed

Text of statute as originally enacted

Moss Troopers Act 1712
- Act of Parliament
- Parliament of Great Britain
- Long title: An Act for continuing the Acts therein mentioned, for preventing Theft and Rapine upon the Northern Borders of England.
- Citation: 12 Ann. c. 10; 12 Ann. St. 1. c. 10
- Territorial extent: Great Britain

Dates
- Royal assent: 6 July 1713
- Commencement: 9 April 1713
- Repealed: 15 July 1867
Other legislation
Amends	Moss Troopers Act 1662; Moss Troopers Act 1666; Moss Troopers Act 1677; Moss Troopers Act 1685; Moss Troopers Act 1695; Moss Troopers Act 1700
Repealed by	Statute Law Revision Act 1867

Status: Repealed

Text of statute as originally enacted

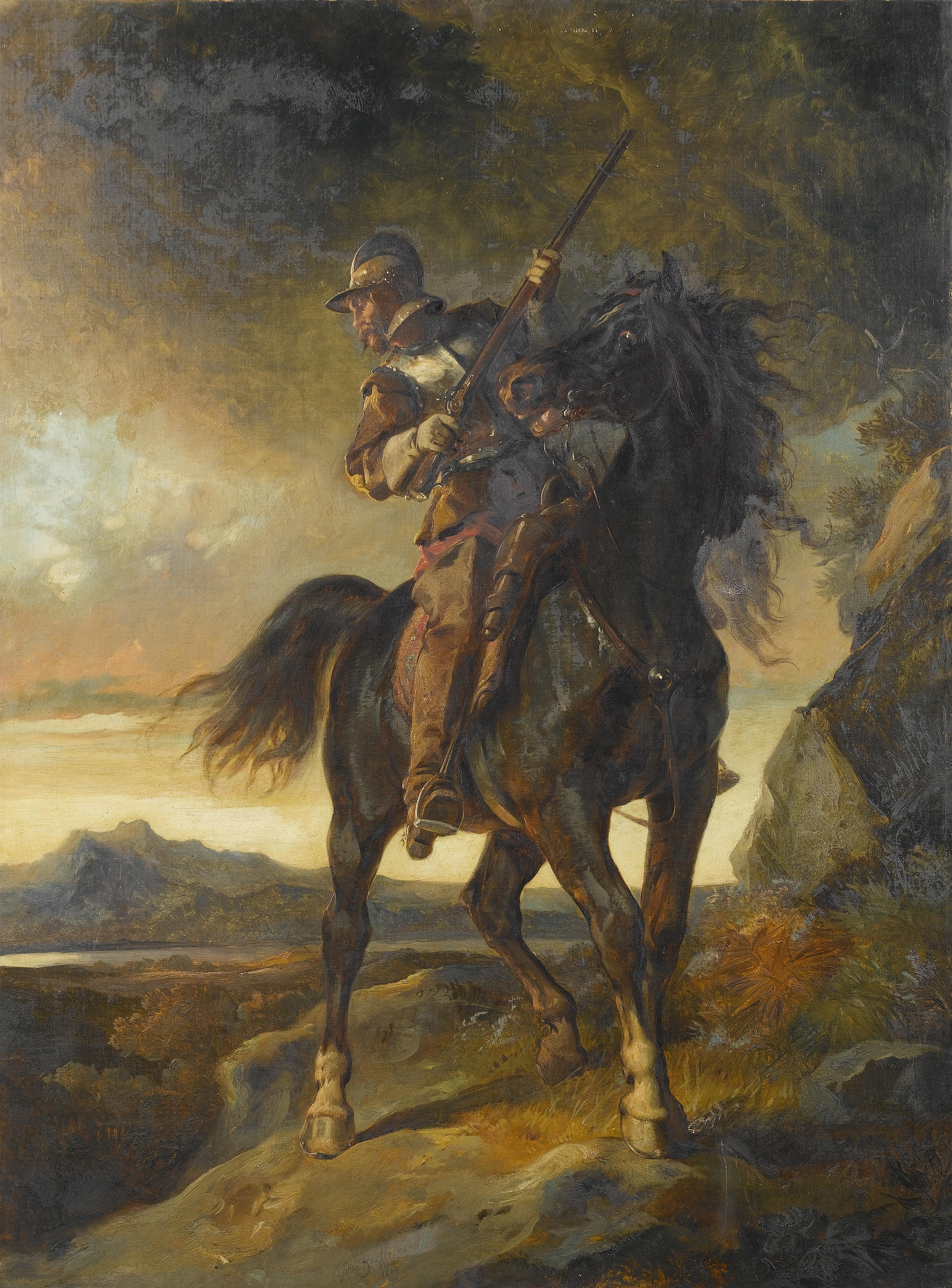
The Moss-trooper, by Thomas Jones Barker

Moss-troopers were brigands of the mid-17th century, who operated across the border country between Scotland and the northern English counties of Northumberland and Cumberland during the period of the English Commonwealth, until after the Restoration.

Much like the earlier border reivers who had operated in the lawless region during the 16th century and were dealt with, moss-troopers do not have a clear genesis. They gradually evolved, or reemerged, from the long running sociopolitical milieu of the Border. Mention of them appears suddenly in historical records and gives the false impression that they appeared suddenly, but the first statute passed to deal with them, the Moss Troopers Act 1662 (14 Cha. 2. c. 22), notes the moss-troopers to have been a long-running problem.

In the Scots language, "moss" refers to marsh, bog, or soft wet ground.

With the 1662 act about to expire, the Cavalier Parliament passed the Moss Troopers Act 1666 (18 & 19 Cha. 2. c. 3). Under section two of this act, the benefit of clergy was taken away from those convicted, which generally meant a death sentence, or otherwise with judicial discretion, the notorious thieves and spoil-takers in Northumberland or Cumberland were to be transported to America, "there to remaine and not to returne".

Many moss-troopers were disbanded or deserting soldiers from one of the Scottish armies of the Wars of the Three Kingdoms. They had kept their weapons and lived a life of brigandage, attacking both civilians and Parliamentary soldiers for supplies during the Royalist rising of 1653 to 1654 when English Parliamentarian troops under George Monck occupied Scotland. Moss-troopers usually operated in small bands, either on the fringes of the Highlands or in the border regions. Many Highland lairds complained of moss-troopers' cattle-stealing and of how they incurred military reprisals against the Highlands as a whole.

Some moss-troopers may have had a national-political as well as an economic motivation, believing in resisting the Cromwellian occupation of Scotland – much as their Irish contemporaries, the "tories", in part resisted English occupation.

== See also ==
- Rapparees – Irish guerrillas who fought for James II after the Revolution of 1688 and who on his defeat switched to cattle raiding and extorting protection against theft from Ulster Scots merchants and Anglo-Irish landlords.
- Iain Dubh Camshròn (Sergent Mòr), who fought on after the Jacobite rising of 1745 until his capture at the Raid on Rannoch and execution for cattle raiding in 1753.
