= Braes of Rannoch =

Hill in Perthshire, Scotland

Coordinates: 56.6774°N 4.4377°W

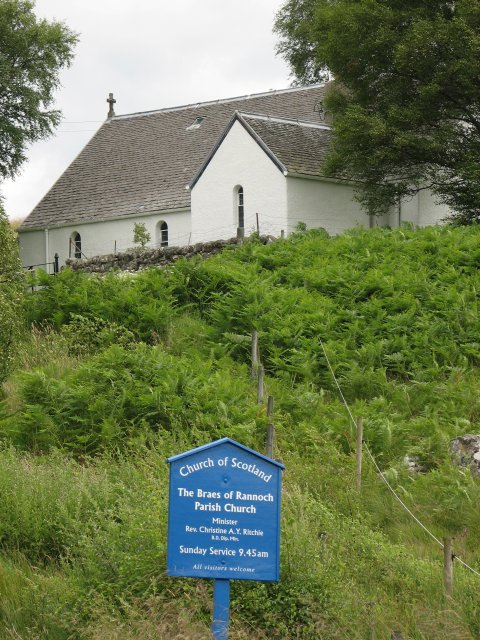
Braes of Rannoch Parish Church

Braes of Rannoch (wikt:braes, slopes, Gaelic Braigh Raithneach) is a hill with a deserted hamlet and church in Perthshire. The hamlet was formerly, briefly, called Georgetown, as the redcoat barracks of Jacobite rising of 1745 were then known, then known as Bridge of Rannoch, or Bridge of Gaur, after the bridge on the River Gaur. The original barracks have gone but a large house and shooting lodge, Rannoch Barracks, is named after them. The Braes of Rannoch Manse became a hostel for forestry workers by the 1970s. The church is today a tourist feature on the road from Kinloch Rannoch to Rannoch Station.

The hamlet has had three churches – in 1776, 1855, and 1907, with the bellcote being moved each time. The first church was associated with the Gaelic Bible translator and poet Dugald Buchanan and the third with the Rev. A. E. Robertson, president of the Scottish Mountaineering Society. The third was designed by Glasgow architect, Peter MacGregor Chalmers.

The hamlet, or hill, features in the Gaelic song Bothan Àirigh am Bràigh Raithneach ("A shieling on the Braes of Rannoch").
