= Mo Shùil Ad Dhèidh =

Mo Shùil Ad Dhèidh ("My Eye is After You"), also known as Och Òin, Mo Chailinn ("Alas, My Maiden"), is a traditional Scottish song of lost love, originally written as a poem by the Reverend Donald MacNicol (1735-1802).

The thirty-five-year-old Rev. MacNicol wrote the poem in lament of being snubbed by Lillias Campbell, a local laird's daughter. He had requested the seventeen-year-old girl's hand in marriage, but Lillias had already accepted the hand of her cousin, Captain Alexander Campbell. However, Sir Alexander made an ungallant bet with a servant which left the angered Lillias no choice but to accept the alternate proposal of the Rev. MacNicol. They married just after her eighteenth birthday, and would go on to have sixteen children. The poem was later set to music and remains a popular Highland folk song.

== Lyrics ==
Dh’ éirich mi moch air mhaduinn an-dé
‘S gun ghearr mi’n ear-thalmhainn do bhrìgh mo sgéil
An dùil gu ‘m faicinn fhéin rùn mo chléibh
Och òin gu ‘m faca ‘s a cùl rium féin.

Chorus:
Och òch mo chailinn ‘s mo shùil ad dhéidh
Och òch mo chailinn ‘s mo shùil ad dhéidh
Mo Lili mo Lili ‘s mo shùil ad dhéidh
Cha léir dhomh am bealach aig cumha nan deur.

Na’m biodh sud agam mo lùth ‘s mo leum
Mi ‘m shuidh’ air a bheallach ‘s mo chù air èill
Gun dèanainn-sa cogadh gu làidir treun
Mu’n leiginn mo leannan le fear tha fo’n ghréin.

Tha mulad orm-sa is fiabhras mór
O chualas gu ‘n deach’ thu le Brian a dh’òl
Mo chomunn cha deanain ri mnaoi tha ‘san fheòil
O rinn thu mo thréigsinn ‘s mi fhéin a bhith beò.

O chan eil uiseag no aoilinn bhàn
Am bàrr a’ chaisteil far’n robh mi ‘s mo ghràdh
Nach bheil ri tuireadh do’oidhche ‘s do là
O chual iad gun ghlacadh mo chailinn air làimh.

Nan tigeadh tu ‘m baile le d’ ghille ‘s le t-each
Gu’m fosglainn an dorus ‘s gu leiginn thu steach
Gu’n dèanainn do leapa ‘s gu’n laidhinn fhéin leat
‘S cha b’fhad leinn an oich’ ‘s biodh mìos innt air fad.

Och òch mo chailinn ‘s mo shùil ad dhéidh
Och òch mo chailinn ‘s mo shùil ad dhéidh
Mo Lili mo Lili ‘s mo shùil ad dhéidh
Cha léir dhomh am bealach aig cumha nan deur.

I got up early in the morning yesterday
and I cut some common yarrow to tell my story
in hope that I'd see the my heart's desire
Oh alas I saw her with her back turned to me.

Chorus:
Oh oh my girl I long for you
Oh oh my girl I long for you
My Lili, my Lili, I long for you
I can't see the pass through lamenting tearfully.

If I were to have my strength and my energy
while sitting on the pass with my dog on leash
I would fight strongly and bravely
before I would let my darling be belong to any man under the sun.

I am suffering from sadness and a heavy fever
since I hear that you went drinking with Brian.
I wouldn't give my company to any woman at all
since you deserted me and while I'm still alive.

Oh there's no skylark and no white seagull
on top of the castle where I was with my love
that isn't lamenting by night and by day
since they heard that my girl would take another's hand.

If you would come home with your servant and your horse
I would open the door to you and let you inside,
I would make your bed and I myself would lie with you
and the night would not seem long to us though it were a month long.

Oh oh my girl I long for you
Oh oh my girl I long for you
My Lili, my Lili, I long for you
I can't see the pass through lamenting tearfully.
