= Amulree, Ontario =

Amulree
- Unincorporated community
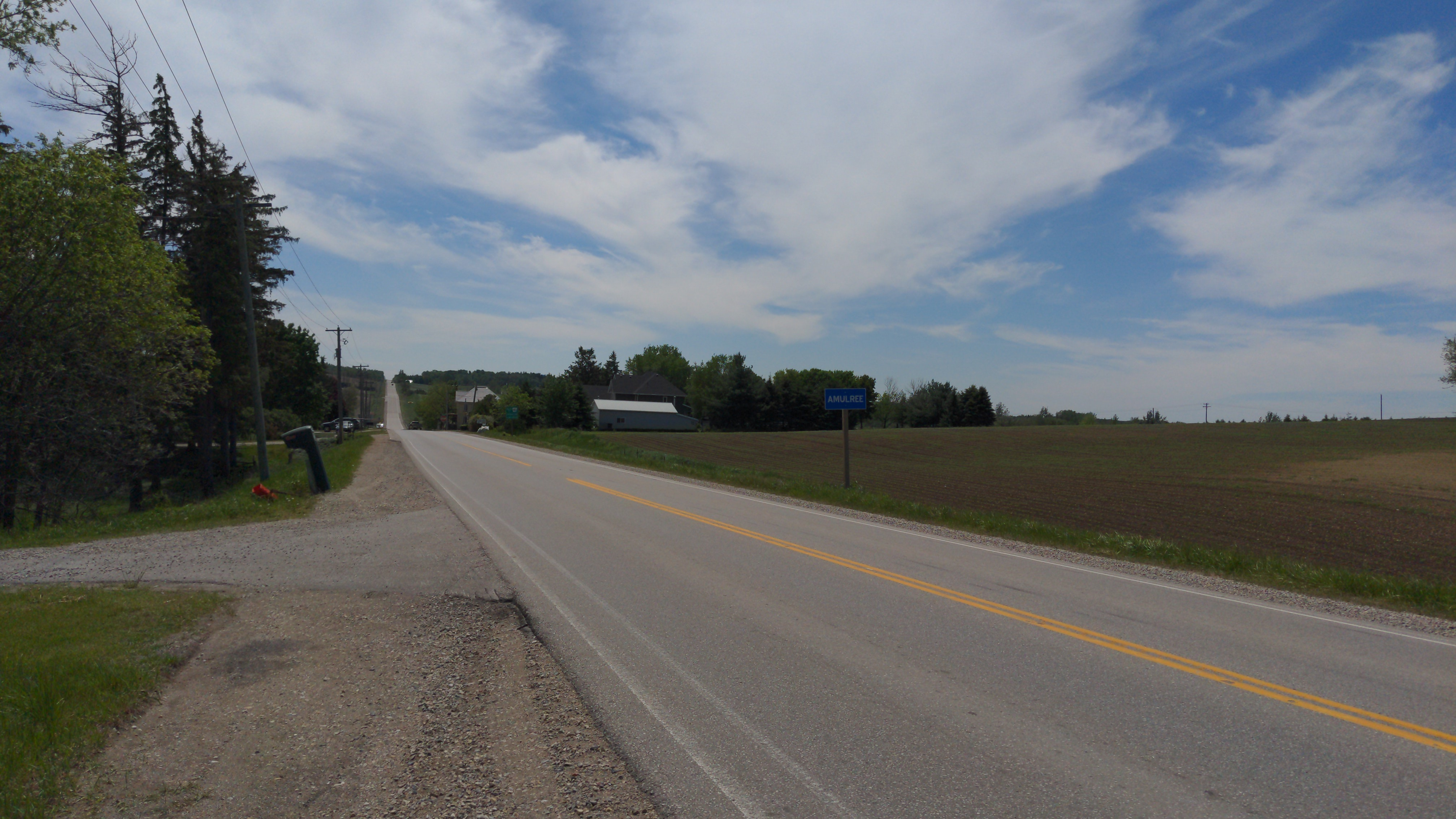

- Location within Ontario Location within Canada
- Country: Canada
- Province: Ontario
- County: Perth
- Township: Perth East
- Time zone: UTC-5 (EST)
  - Summer (DST): UTC-4 (EDT)

Amulree is a community in the township of Perth East, Perth County, Ontario, Canada. It lies 13 kilometres (8 mi) northeast of Stratford and 28 kilometres (17 mi) west of Kitchener. Silver Creek runs past the community. The settlement was named after the hamlet of Amulree in Perthshire, Scotland, and a number of its early settlers were from Perthshire.

== See also ==
- List of unincorporated communities in Ontario
