= Robert Kirk (folklorist) =

Scottish folklorist (1644–1692)

- Born: 9 December 1644; Aberfoyle, Stirling, Scotland
- Died: 14 May 1692 (aged 47); Doon Hill, Aberfoyle, Stirling, Scotland
- Other name: "The Fairy Minister"
- Education: University of St Andrews (1664); University of Edinburgh (1661)
- Occupations: Minister, scholar, folklorist
- Known for: The Secret Commonwealth (1692); An Biobla Naomhtha (1688); Psalma Dhaibhidh an Meadradchd (1684); Ministry at Balquhidder
- Spouses: Isobel Campbel (died 1680); Margaret Campbell of Fordie
- Children: 2
- Parent: James Kirk

Robert Kirk (9 December 1644 – 14 May 1692) was a minister, Gaelic scholar and folklorist, best known for The Secret Commonwealth, a treatise on fairy folklore, witchcraft, ghosts, and second sight, a type of extrasensory perception described as a phenomenon by the people of the Scottish Highlands. Folklorist Stewart Sanderson and mythologist Marina Warner called Kirk's collection of supernatural tales one of the most important and significant works on the subject of fairies and second sight. Christian philosopher and religious studies scholar David Bentley Hart has praised Kirk for writing The Secret Commonwealth to defend "harmless Scottish country folk who innocently dabbled in the lore of their culture" and "found themselves arraigned by Presbyterian courts for practicing the black arts."

In the late 1680s, Kirk travelled to London to help publish one of the first translations of the Bible into Scottish Gaelic. Gentleman scientist Robert Boyle financed the publication of the Gaelic Bible and pursued inquiries into Kirk's reports of second sight. Kirk died before he was able to publish The Secret Commonwealth. Legends arose after Kirk's death saying he had been taken away to fairyland for revealing the secrets of the Good People.

Scottish author Walter Scott first published Kirk's work on fairies more than a century later in 1815. Andrew Lang later gave it the popular title, The Secret Commonwealth of Elves, Fauns and Fairies (1893). Multiple editions of The Secret Commonwealth have since been published, with notable scholarly analysis by Sanderson, Mario M. Rossi, and Michael Hunter.

== Life ==
Kirk was born in Aberfoyle, Scotland, the seventh and youngest son of James Kirk, minister at Aberfoyle, Perthshire. He studied theology at St Andrews and received his master's degree at Edinburgh in 1661. Kirk became minister of Balquhidder in 1664, and later of Aberfoyle, from 1685 until his death. In 1670, he married his first wife, Isobel Campbel, the daughter of Sir Colin Campbel of Mochaster. Isobel produced a son, Colin, who became a writer to the signet. When she died on 25 December 1680, Kirk cut out an epitaph for her by himself. His second wife, Margaret, the daughter of Campbell of Fordy, bore him a second son, Robert, who became a minister at Dornoch, Sutherlandshire.

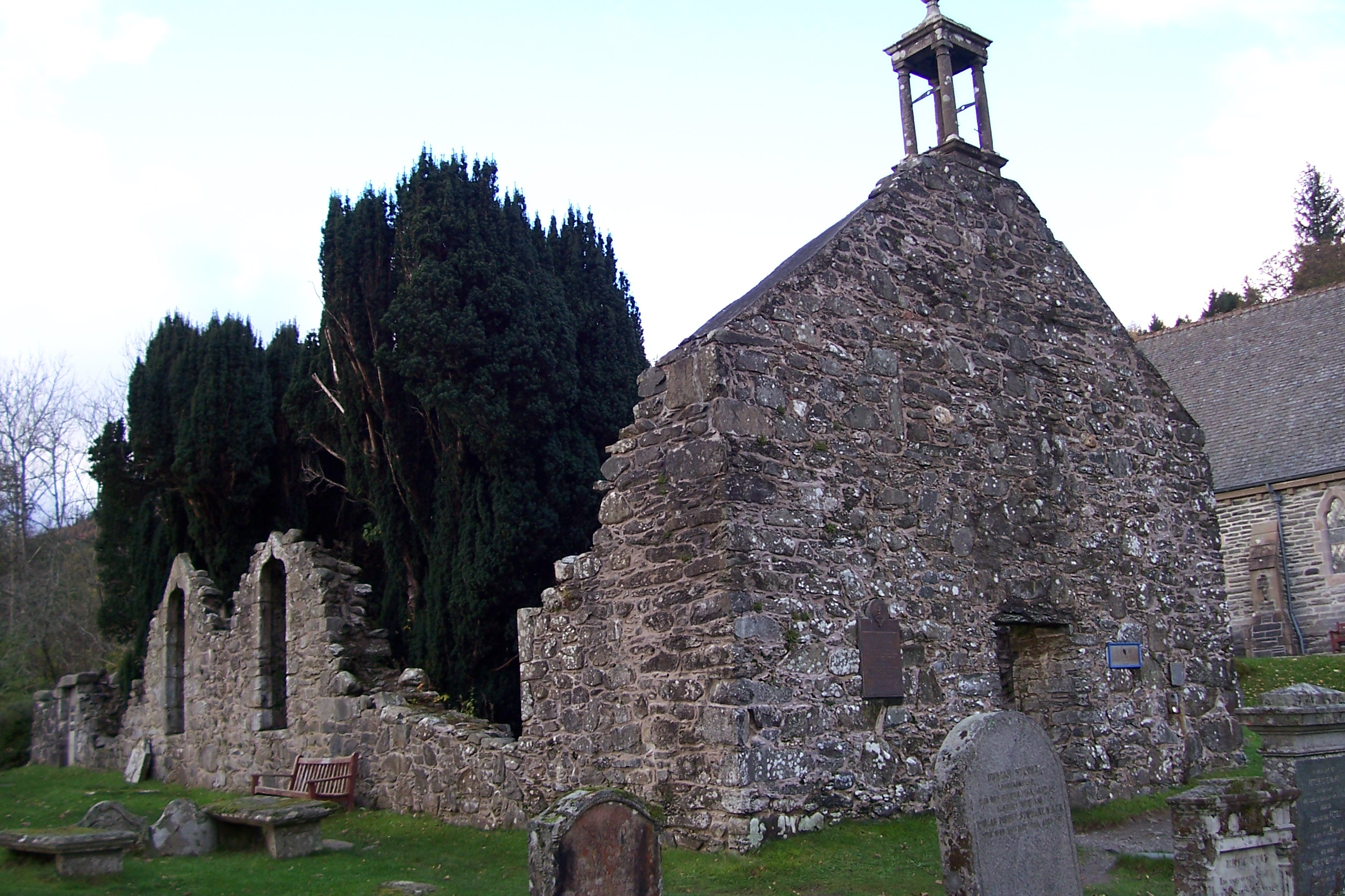
Kirk was minister at Balquhidder until 1685.

Kirk was a Gaelic scholar, the author of the first complete translation of the Scottish metrical psalms into Gaelic, published at Edinburgh in 1684 as Psalma Dhaibhidh an Meadrachd, &c. (Psalms of David in Metre, &c.). During its preparation Kirk learned that the synod of Argyll intended to bring out a rival version, and stories are told of how he used to keep himself awake while working to be first in the field.

In 1689, Kirk was called to London to superintend the printing of An Biobla Naomhtha, the Gaelic Bible that had begun decades earlier under the direction of Bishop William Bedell. It was published in 1690. To this version Kirk added a short Gaelic vocabulary (6 pp.), which was republished, with additions by Edward Lhuyd in William Nicolson's Historical Library (London, 1702).

Kirk's involvement in Bedell's Bible was at the request of his friend James Kirkwood, a promoter of Scottish Gaelic literacy. The printing was funded by scientist Robert Boyle, a member of the Royal Society.

== The Secret Commonwealth ==
The Secret Commonwealth is a collection of folklore collected between 1691 and 1692 and published in 1815. Folklorist Stewart Sanderson and mythologist Marina Warner called Kirk's collection of supernatural tales one of the most important and significant works on the subject of fairies and second sight.

According to George MacDonald Ross, professor of philosophy at the University of Leeds, Kirk documented fairy folklore from traditional accounts in the Scottish Highlands to promote Christianity and its biblical account of "non-human spirits". Historian Michael Hunter believed that "Kirk also saw the value of second sight in vindicating the supernatural against 'atheists'". Kirk probably encountered opposition to his supernatural beliefs in the secular and sceptical climate of 17th-century coffeehouses in Restoration London, during his visit in 1689.

Kirk collected these stories into a manuscript sometime between 1691 and 1692, but died before it could be published. More than a century would pass before the book was finally released by Scottish author Walter Scott in 1815 under the title The Secret Commonwealth or an Essay on the Nature and Actions of the Subterranean (and for the most part) Invisible People heretofore going under the names of Fauns and Fairies, or the like, among the Low Country Scots as described by those who have second sight, 1691. The autograph copy is currently unaccounted for, and published editions rely on one or more of 4 known manuscript copies. Walter Scott's 1815 edition was based on one of these 4 known manuscripts, which he borrowed from the Advocates Library to copy, and which has been missing ever since.

The book also contains Kirk's transcript of a letter from George Mackenzie, Viscount of Tarbat to Robert Boyle.

Folklore scholars consider The Secret Commonwealth one of the most important and authoritative works on fairy folk beliefs. He describes the fairies as follows:

These Siths or Fairies they call Sleagh Maith or the Good People [...] are said to be of middle nature between Man and Angel, as were Daemons thought to be of old; of intelligent fluidous Spirits, and light changeable bodies (lyke those called Astral) somewhat of the nature of a condensed cloud, and best seen in twilight. These bodies be so pliable through the sublety of Spirits that agitate them, that they can make them appear or disappear at pleasure.

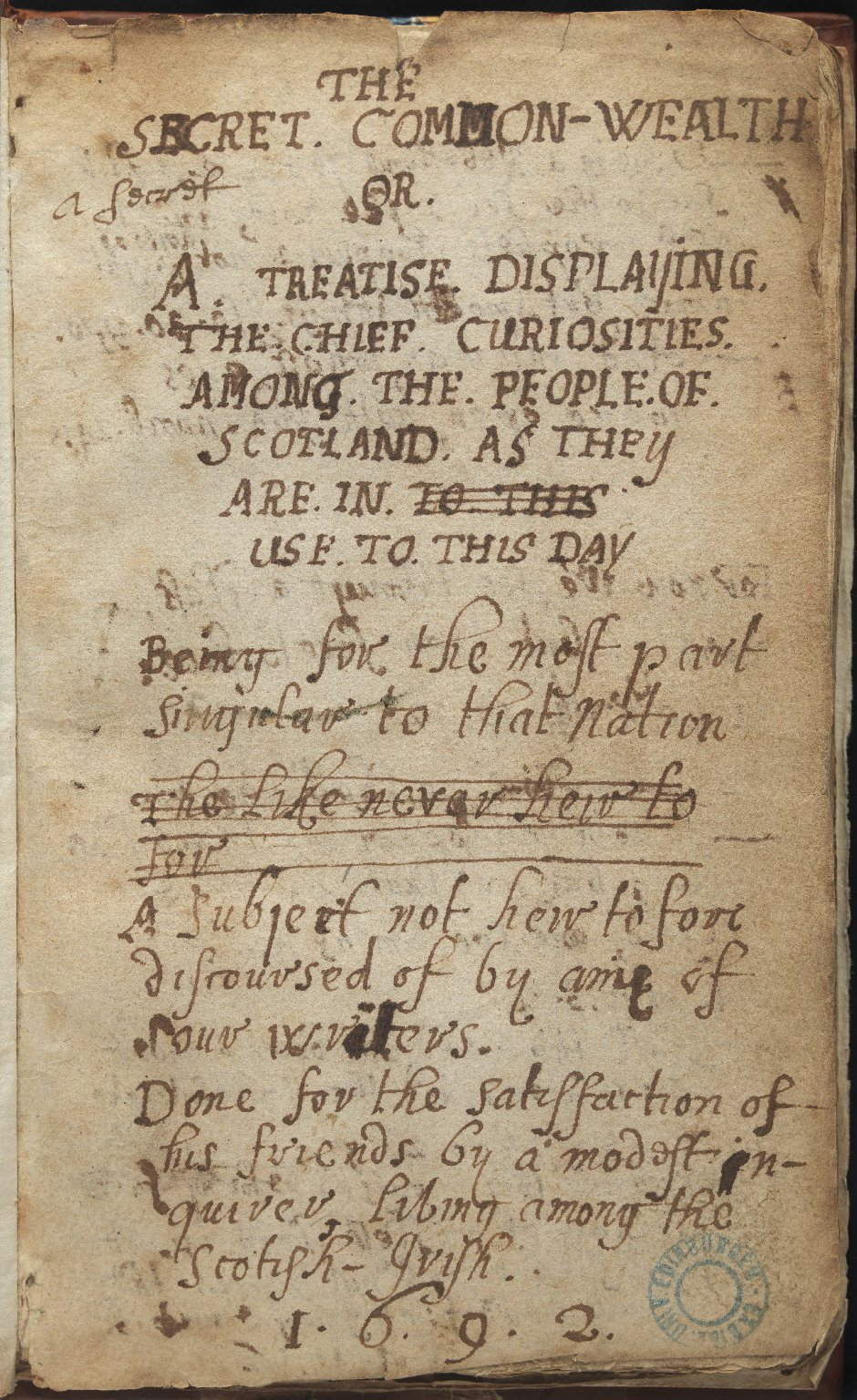
Secret Commonwealth Manuscript Title Page

Andrew Lang published a second edition of the book in 1893, under the title The Secret Commonwealth of Elves, Fauns and Fairies, followed by a 1933 version with an introduction by Robert Bontine Cunninghame Graham. Both of these editions were copies of Scott's 1815 edition. Multiple editions of The Secret Commonwealth have since been published, with notable scholarly analysis by Sanderson, Mario M. Rossi, and Michael Hunter. Stewart Sanderson edited a new edition for the Folklore Society in 1976 followed by a contemporary version published by Robert John Stewart in 1990, with an extensive commentary exploring many of the esoteric themes contained in the text. Michael Hunter edited a new edition in 2001, and New York Review Books published a new version in 2006 with an introduction by Marina Warner.

Manuscript La.III.551 at the University of Edinburgh was written in 1692 by Robert Campbell, and is the oldest of the known and accounted for manuscript versions. It is presumably a copy of Kirk's original, and Hunter and Sanderson both relied primarily on it for their scholarly editions of The Secret Commonwealth. There are also two 18th-century manuscript copies of unknown origin, MS. 5022 at the National Library of Scotland, and MS Gen 308D at the University of Edinburgh.

== Death ==
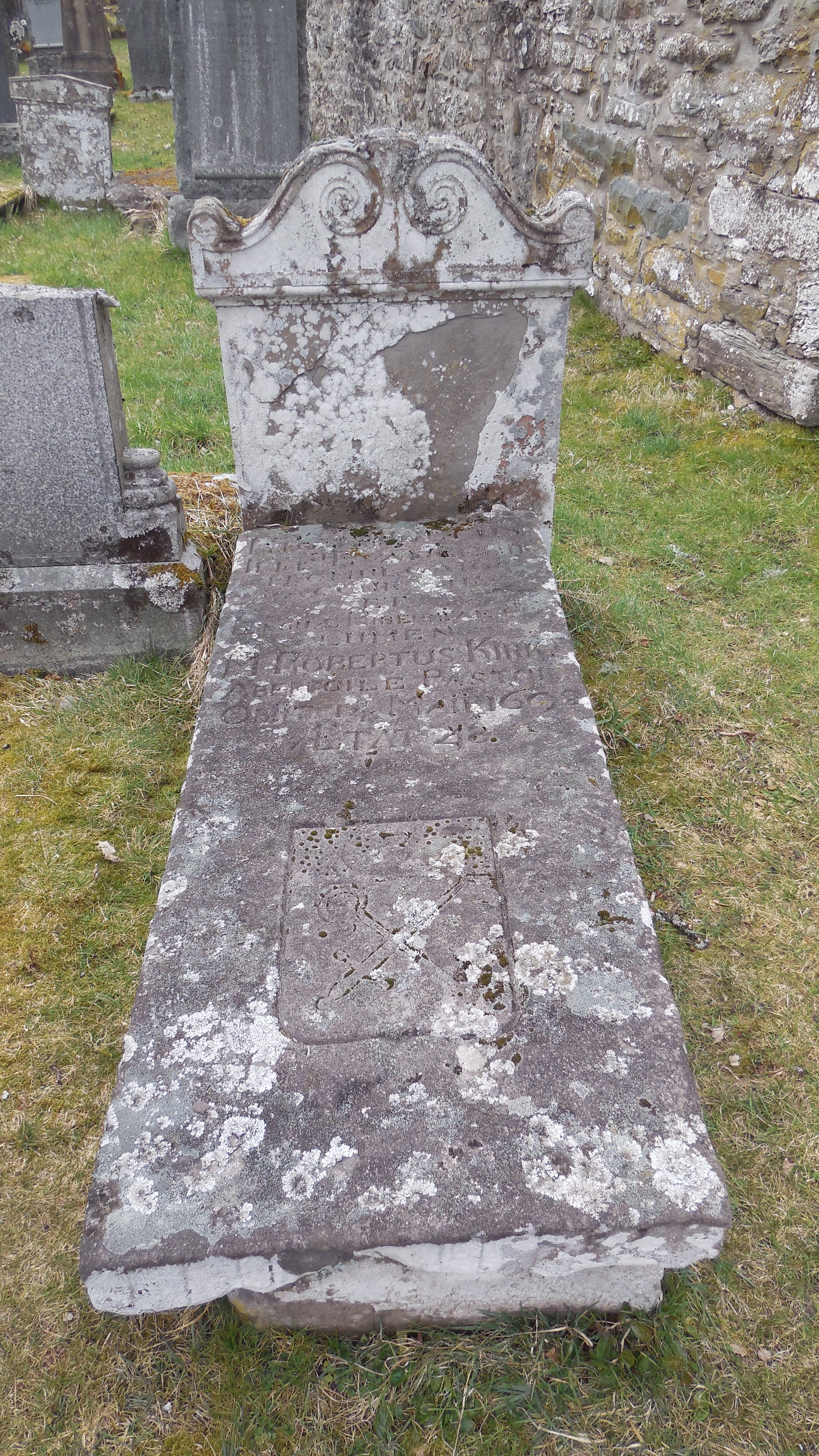
Robert Kirk's grave stone in Aberfoyle, Scotland

Kirk died before he was able to publish The Secret Commonwealth. Legends arose after Kirk's death saying he had been taken away to fairyland for revealing the secrets of the Good People. Scottish studies and folklore scholar Stewart Sanderson (1924–2016) reported that Kirk

was in the habit of taking a turn in his nightgown on summer evenings on the fairy hill beside the manse, in order to get a breath of fresh air before retiring to bed: and one evening in 1692 – 14 May – his body was found lying, apparently dead, on the hill.

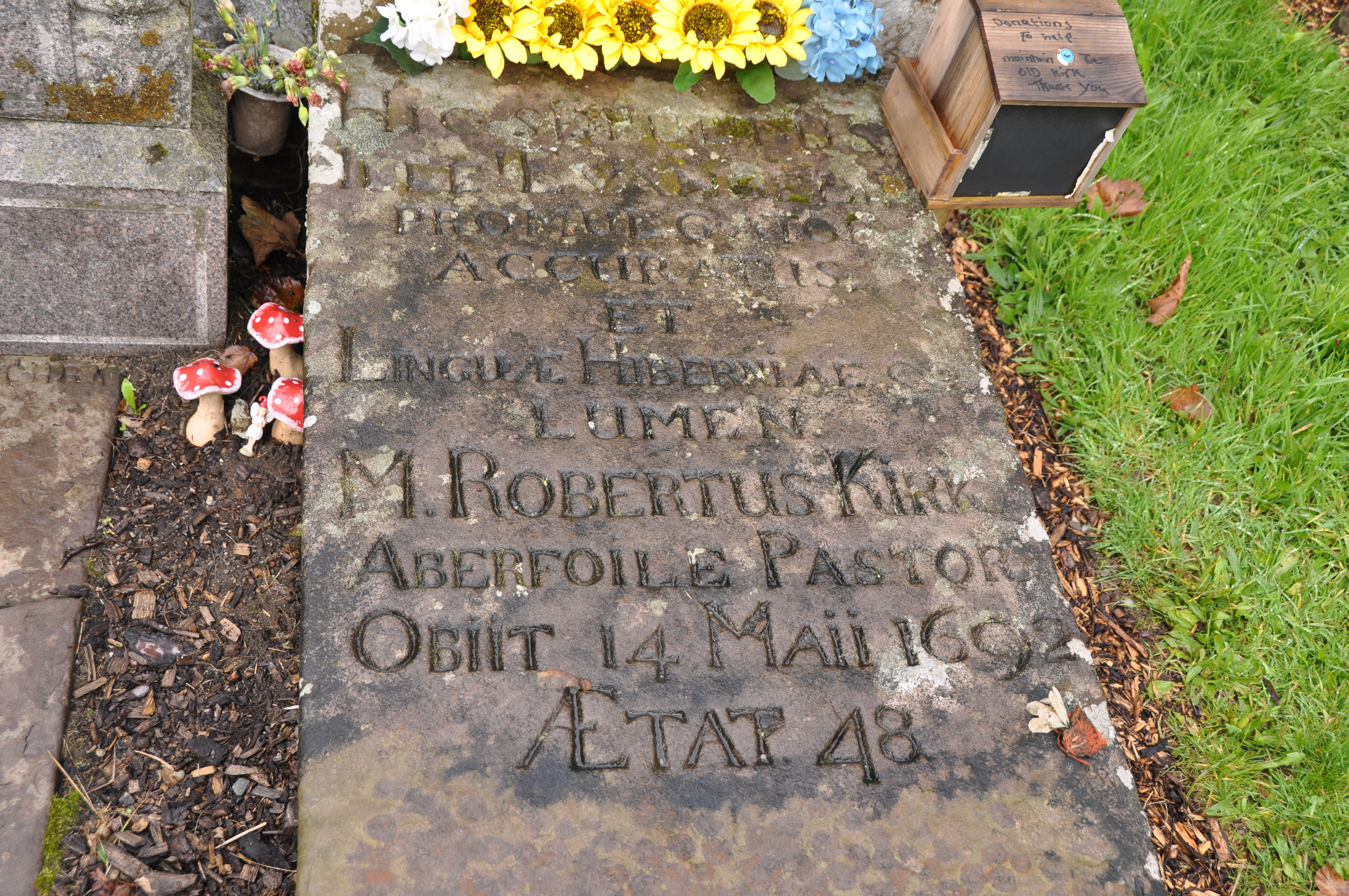
Epitaph on Robert Kirk tombstone, Aberfoyle Old Burial Ground, Scotland

Kirk's tomb is located in Aberfoyle old churchyard on Manse Rd, next to the south-east corner of the ruins of the old church also known as Kirkton Church. His grave was marked by a stone which bears the following inscription:

HIC SEPULTUS (est)
ILLE EVANGELII
PROMULGATOR
ACCURATUS
ET
LINGUÆ HIBERNIAE
LUMEN
M. ROBERTUS KIRK
ABERFOILE PASTOR
OBIIT 14 MAII 1692
ÆTAT(e) 48

This translates to "Here is buried that illustrious and accurate publisher of the Gospel, luminary of the Gaelic language. M. Robert Kirk, Aberfoyle minister, died 14 May 1692, aged 48.".

Popular legend questions whether his ashes or even his body is buried there. After his death, folktales arose saying that his body had been taken away by fairies to become the "Chaplain to the Fairy Queen". Roderick U. Sayce, then at the Museum of Archaeology and Anthropology, University of Cambridge, noted the similarity between the legend of Kirk's death and the Germanic legend of Dietrich von Bern, who in one tale was taken away by a dwarf when he died. According to Sayce, both share a theme common to ancestral spirit cults—the departed are taken away to fairyland.

== In literature and the arts ==
The romantic narrative of Kirk's engagement with the Commonwealth of Fairies was dramatised by Netta Blair Reid in her play The Shepherd Beguiled, premiered in Edinburgh by Theatre Alba under the direction of Charles Nowosielski in 1982, subsequently produced at the Brunton Theatre, Musselburgh, in 1986, and revived by Theatre Alba at Duddingston Kirk in 2016.

== Notes ==
Attribution This article incorporates text from a publication now in the public domain: Hadden, James Cuthbert (1892). "Kirk, Robert". In Lee, Sidney (ed.). Dictionary of National Biography. Vol. 31. London: Smith, Elder & Co.
