= Garrow Bridge =

Bridge in Perth and Kinross, Scotland

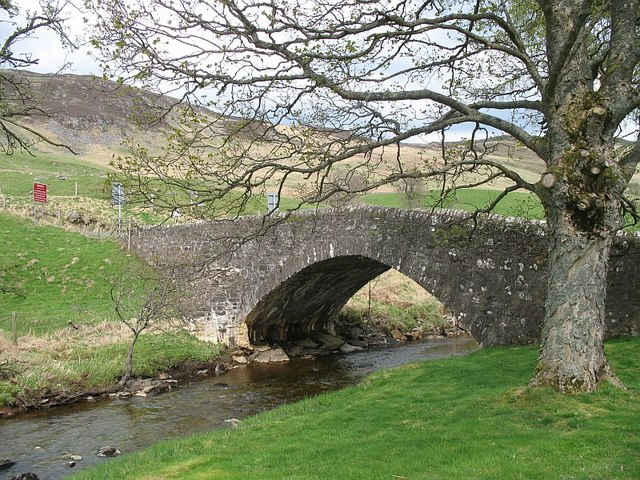
- Pictured in 2008, looking downstream
- Coordinates: 56.53938°N 3.91149°W
- Crosses: River Quaich
- Locale: Perth and Kinross

History
- Opened: Early 19th century

Listed Building – Category C(S)
- Official name: Garrow Bridge Over River Quaich
- Designated: 8 June 1981
- Reference no.: LB6194

Location
- Interactive map of Garrow Bridge

Garrow Bridge is a bridge in Garrow, Perth and Kinross, Scotland. A Category C listed structure since 1981, it is a single segmental arch bridge, built from rubble, which crosses the River Quaich.

== See also ==
- List of bridges in Scotland
