= Society in Scotland for Propagating Christian Knowledge =

The Society in Scotland for Propagating Christian Knowledge, or the SSPCK, was a group established in Scotland to promote the better understanding of the principles of the reformed Christian religion, principally through the established Church of Scotland.

== History ==
=== 18th century ===
Founded in 1709, the Society had similar aims to the English Society for Promoting Christian Knowledge, which was made up of Anglicans and did not concern itself with Scotland. Its main activity was in evangelising the Scottish Highlands, sending ministers to Scottish emigrant communities overseas, and sending missionaries to convert native peoples to Christianity.

The Society began to establish schools in the Highlands with the aim of reducing Jacobitism and resisting the rise of Roman Catholicism. The first school was opened on St Kilda in 1711. By the end of that year, the SSPCK had five schools, twenty-five by 1715, 176 by 1758, and 189 by 1808, by which time 13,000 children were attending the schools.

At first, the SSPCK strongly avoided using the Gaelic language in its schools, which has led to the claim that pupils learnt by rote, without understanding what they were being taught. A Society rule of 1720 required the teaching of reading and numbers, "but not any Latin or Irish", a common term for Gaelic in both Ireland and Scotland. In 1741, the SSPCK introduced the Galick and English Vocabulary compiled by the poet Alasdair MacDonald, but in 1753 a rule of the Society forbade children "either in the schoolhouse or when playing about the doors thereof to speak Erse, under pain of being chastised". The desired effect was to strengthen the Church of Scotland and the English language.

John Lorne Campbell wrote in 1997, "Too often Scottish writers, and particularly writers on the history of the Scottish Highlands, have confused 'education' with 'Calvinist indoctrination', such as was given in the S.P.C.K. schools in the Scottish Highlands and Islands, where the Westminster Confession of Faith, the Shorter Catechism, Vincent's Catechism, the Protestant's Resolutions, Pool's Dialogues, and Guthrie's Trials, all in English, formed the bulk of an unattractive list of school books."

It was not until after the final defeat of Jacobitism at Culloden in 1746 that the Society began to consider publishing a Bible in Scottish Gaelic, and it initiated a translation project in 1755. The New Testament translation was led by James Stuart (1701–1789), minister of Killin in Perthshire, and the poet Dugald Buchanan. Stuart worked from the Greek, while Buchanan improved the Gaelic. The work on the Old Testament translation was largely by Stuart's son John Stuart of Luss (1743–1821).

In 1766, the Society allowed its Highland schools to use Gaelic alongside English as a language of instruction. It published a New Testament in Gaelic in 1767, with facing pages of Gaelic and English texts. This was followed by the Old Testament in Gaelic, published in four parts between 1783 and 1801.

Despite the SSPCK's Gaelic language work, in 1790 one of its preachers still insisted that English monolingualism was one of its goals, and ten years later some SSPCK schools were still using corporal punishment on children speaking Gaelic.

=== 19th century ===
By the early 19th century, the Society's activity was declining. Its work in schools was taken over by the Gaelic Societies of Edinburgh, the Glasgow Gaelic School and a group based in Inverness.

In 1879, the Society boasted that through its work "barbarity and the Irish language ... are almost rooted out".

In 1880, the Society formed a commission to revise the Gaelic Bible, including members of the Free Churches as well as the established Church of Scotland, chaired by Norman Macleod. By the time the New Testament was completed the affairs of the Society had come under the investigation of a Royal Commission for alleged financial mismanagement, and in 1883 the work of revision was suspended, to be resumed some thirteen years later in 1896. In 1902 the new revision of the Bible was adopted by the National Bible Society of Scotland, later renamed the Scottish Bible Society. The National Bible Society continues to exist as the Society in Scotland for Propagating Christian Knowledge.
