= James Kirkwood (Church of Scotland) =

James Kirkwood (c.1650–1708 or 1709) was a Church of Scotland minister, advocate of free parish libraries, and promoter of Scottish Gaelic language literacy. He was behind the Bible translations into Scottish Gaelic of Robert Kirk.

In 1685 he was deprived of the living of ministry for refusing to take the test and moved to England to become rector of Astwick, Bedfordshire, but following the Act of Settlement 1701 was ejected for not abjuring under the Act of Security 1704, which required the taker of the oath to renounce their allegiance to the Stuarts and the Church.

== Life ==
He was born at Dunbar, in about 1650. He graduated M.A. from Edinburgh University in 1670, and after passing his trials before the presbytery of Haddington became domestic chaplain to John Campbell, Earl of Caithness, by whom, on 12 May 1679, he was presented to the living of Minto. Deprived of this benefice after 1 November 1681 for refusing to take the test, Kirkwood, as one of the "outed ministers", migrated to England, where, on 1 March 1685, through the friendship of Gilbert Burnet, he was instituted to the rectory of Astwick, Bedfordshire.

In 1690 Kingwood began a correspondence with Robert Boyle on the subject of the Gaelic scriptures for the Highlanders. Boyle presented him with two hundred copies of his Bible in Irish for immediate circulation, and subscribed towards the printing of three thousand more copies, which Kirkwood succeeded in distributing over the north of Scotland, in spite of opposition to his scheme in England, on the ground that it would help preserve Gaelic.

Kirkwood on 7 January 1702 was ejected from the living of Astwick for not abjuring "according to the statute 13 and 14 William III." He bequeathed his books and papers to the presbytery of Dunbar.

== Works ==
In 1699 there appeared anonymously a tract, An Overture for Founding and Maintaining Bibliothecks in every Paroch throughout the Kingdom. This was printed at Edinburgh, the word "overture" being the technical term for a proposal to the old Scottish parliament. Under the scheme the parish minister's private books were to form the nucleus of each library, the parish schoolmaster was to act as librarian, and a uniform system of cataloguing was to be adopted throughout the country. The tract was reprinted by William Blades in 1889. The Overture is traced to Kirkwood by means of a second tract, A Copy of a Letter anent a Project for Erecting a Library in every Presbytery, or at least every County in the Highlands. From a Reverend Minister of the Scots Nation now in England (no place nor date), to which is appended the statement:

The author of this Letter is a person who has a great zeal for propagating the knowledge of God in the Highlands of Scotland, and is the same who promoted contributions for the printing of Bibles in the Irish language, and sent so many of them down to Scotland.

The general assembly approved the project, but without further action. Laurence Charters, however, states that a library was established for the clergy in the Highlands by Kirkwood in 1699. In recognition of his projects Kirkwood was, on 4 March 1703, elected a corresponding member of the English Society for Promoting Christian Knowledge; and on 11 November 1703 there were read at one of the society's meetings Letters and Papers from Mr. Kirkwood relating to the Erection of Lending Libraries in the Highlands. The tract contained elaborate suggestions and rules for the conduct of a lending library. A dry place was to be chosen; the books were to be kept under lock and key. Some may be lent out, but no one to have more than two at a time, and the borrowers must be approved preachers, schoolmasters, and students. Each book is to have its price against it in the catalogue, and every borrower is to deposit a quarter more than the value, as a security for its safe return.

Kirkwood also wrote A New Family Book, or the True Interest of Families.… Together with several Prayers for Families and Children and Graces before and after Meat. The second edition of this work had a preface by Anthony Horneck and a frontispiece engraved by M. Vandergucht, dated 1693, is preserved in the British Museum Library. Charters assigned the date 1692 to this work, but in a letter to Kirkwood, dated 18 October 1690, Boyle acknowledges the receipt of a copy.

- "A Collection of Highland Rites and Customes" Copied by Edward Lhuyd from the Manuscript of the Rev James Kirkwood (1650-1709) and Annotated by him with the Aid of the Rev John Beaton. - republished and edited John Lorne Campbell (Cambridge, 1975),
