= Edradour distillery =

Whisky distillery in Pitlochry, Scotland

Coordinates: 56°42′3.22″N 3°42′10.13″W

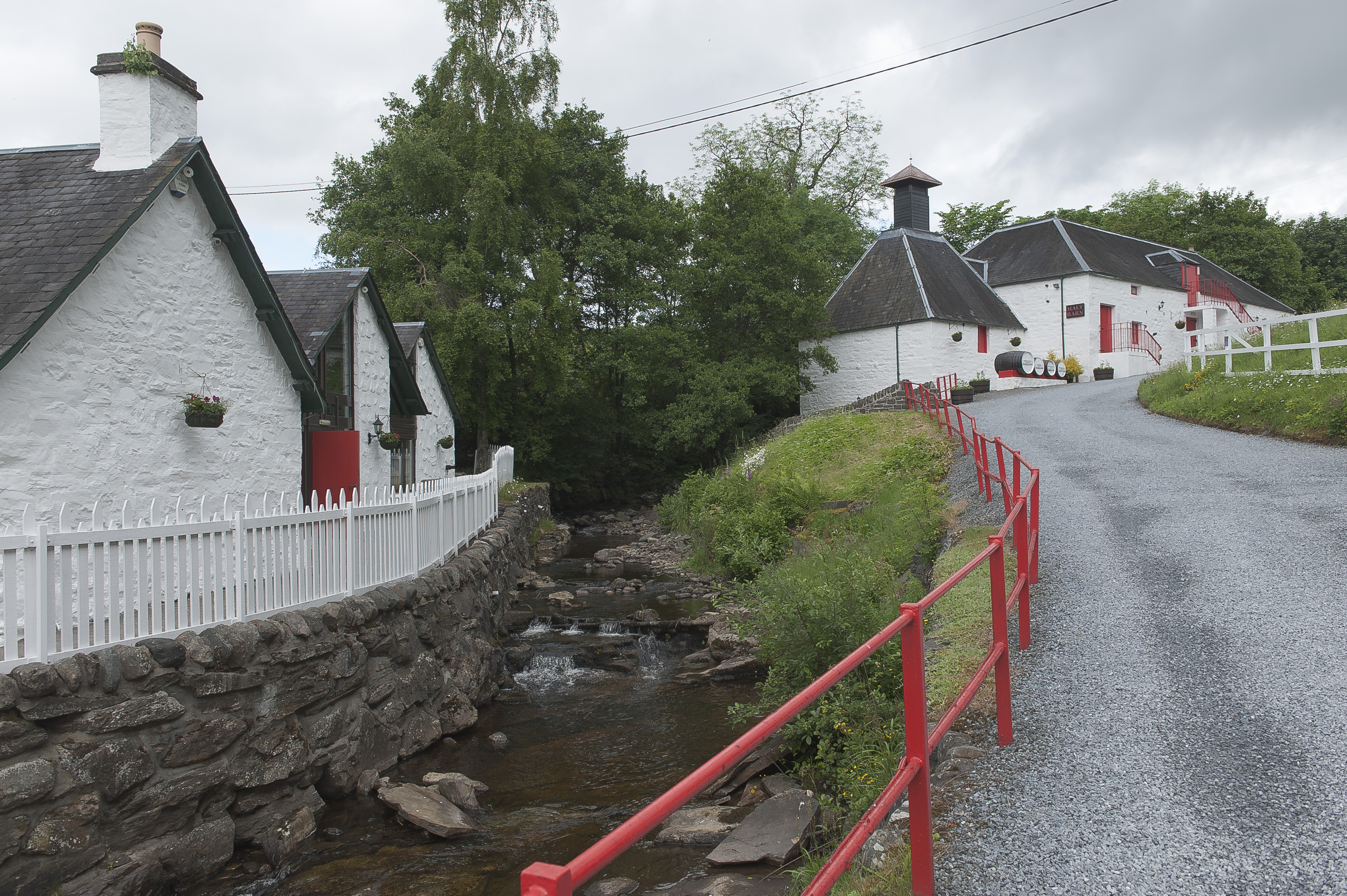
- Buildings
- Location: Pitlochry, Perthshire
- Owner: Signatory Vintage Scotch Whisky Company
- Founded: 1825 (201 years ago)
- Status: Active
- Water source: Ben Vrackie Springs
- No. of stills: 1 wash still 4200 L, 1 spirit still 2200 L
- Capacity: 95,000 litres

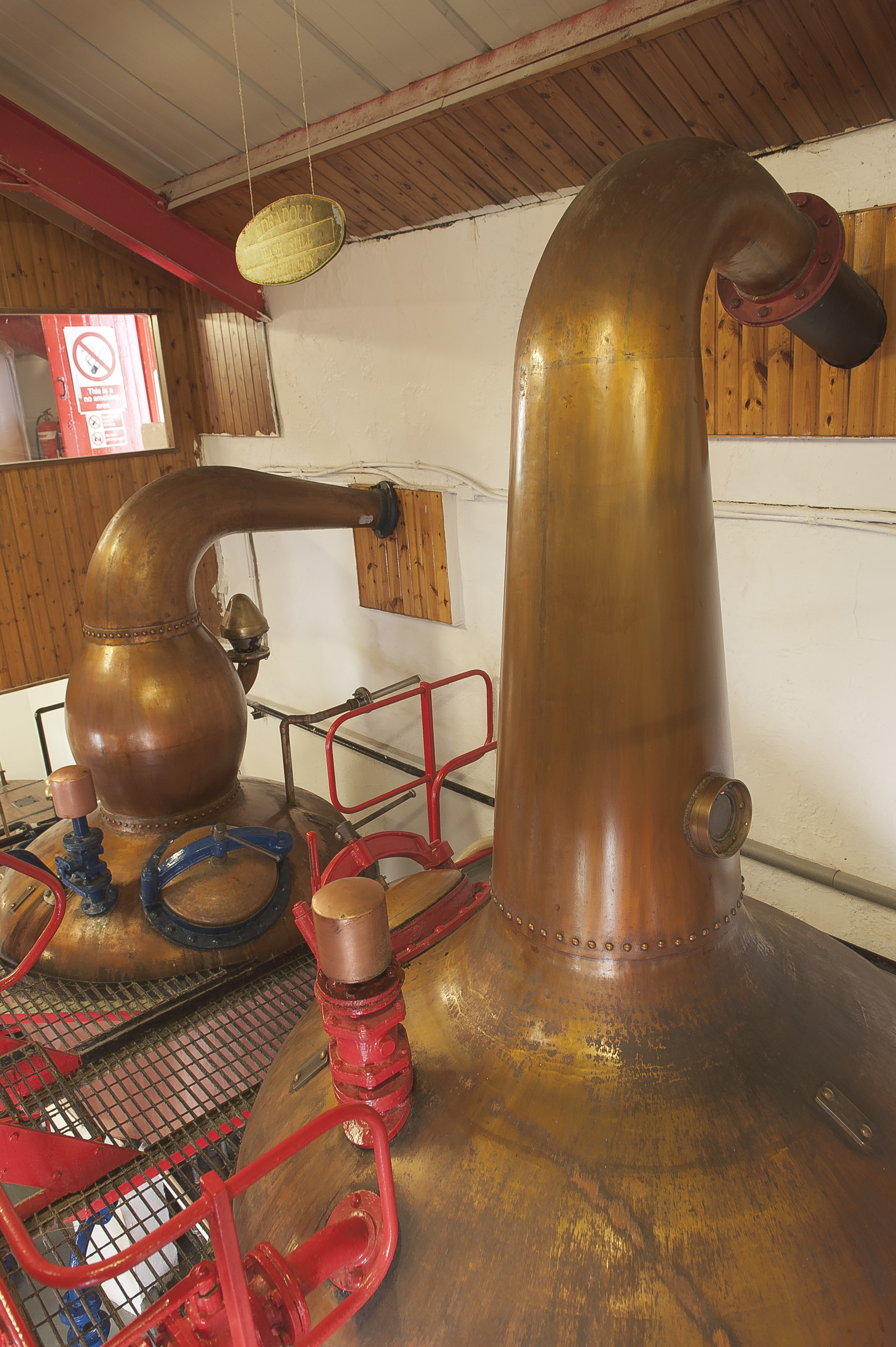
Stills

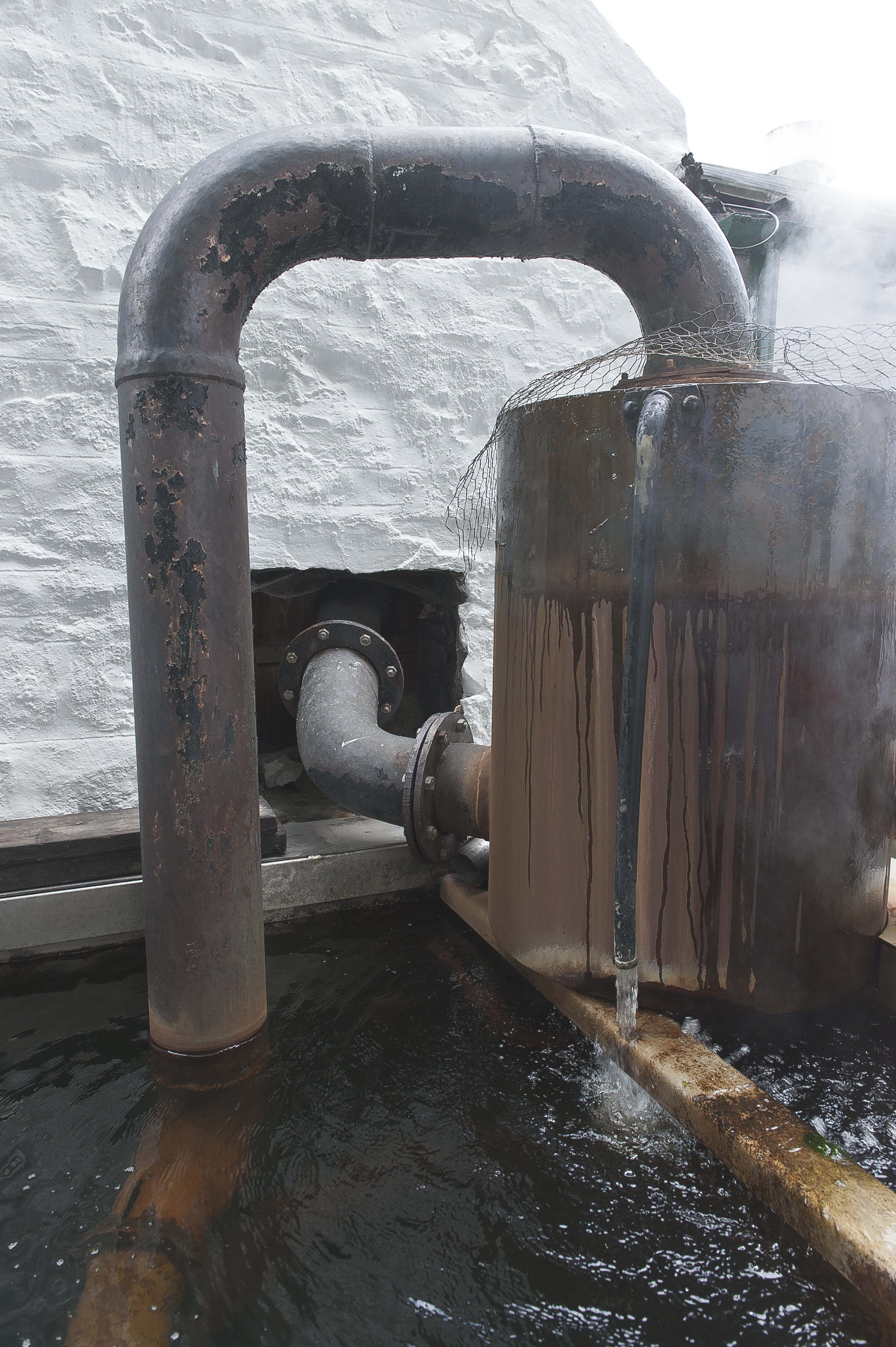
Condenser

Edradour distillery (Scottish Gaelic: Eadar Dhà Dhobhar, "between two rivers") is a Highland single malt whisky distillery based in Pitlochry, Perthshire. It has been owned by the Signatory Vintage Scotch Whisky Company since 2002, and was previously owned by Pernod Ricard.

Signatory, founded in 1988, is primarily an independent bottler and is based in Pitlochry.

== History ==
Founded in 1825, Edradour was originally run by three men. The distillery was initially part of a consortium of farmers, with Duncan Forbes being one of the key figures.

In 1933, the Mackintosh family sold Edradour to William Whiteley & Co.

In 1982, Pernod Ricard subsidiary Campbell Distillers acquired Edradour.

In 2002, the Signatory Vintage Scotch Whisky Company, an independent bottler, purchased Edradour.

== Production ==
The distillery was traditionally run by three men; now there are two. Eighteen casks are produced each week.

The wash still has a capacity of 4,200 litres and the smaller spirit still 2,200 litres.

A variety of whiskies are available from the post-2002 distillery, none of which ever employs artificial colouration, for example, the use of E150a or E150b caramel for either artificial darkening or colour matching and adjustment from batch to batch, nor ever use the process of, endorse or engage in, nor present whiskies that have ever been chill-filtered in any way or to any extent. Chill filtration is a process by which the esters and oils are removed, producing a cleaner look to the whisky, which when chilled or has ice added to it does not turn cloudy. There is, amongst others, a non-chill-filtered 12-year-old malt, some of which goes into the "House of Lords" and "Clan Campbell" blends.

Also produced for two days a week is a heavily peated version of the Edradour called Ballechin. It is named after the former distillery at nearby Ballechin.

== See also ==
- Whisky
- Scotch whisky
- List of whisky brands
- List of distilleries in Scotland
