= Dugald Buchanan =

Scottish poet (1716-1768)

Dugald Buchanan (Dùghall Bochanan in Gaelic) (Ardoch Farm, Strathyre (near Balquhidder) in Perthshire, Scotland 1716–1768) was a Scottish poet writing in Scots and Scottish Gaelic. He helped the Rev. James Stuart or Stewart of Killin to translate the New Testament into Scottish Gaelic. John Reid called him "the Cowper of the Highlands".

== Background ==
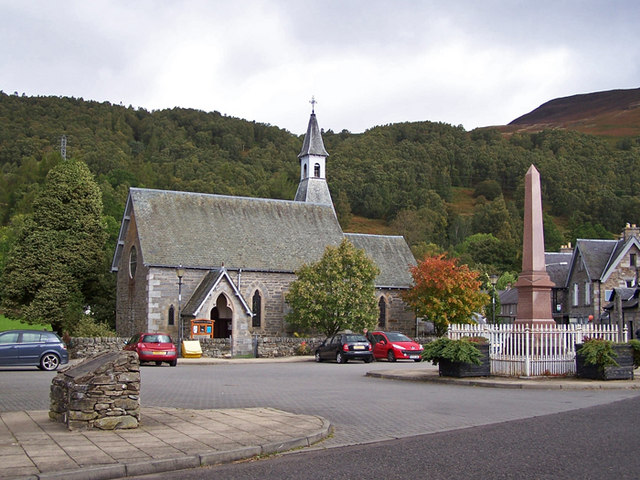
Kinloch Rannoch. The church is All Saints Scottish Episcopal Church. The obelisk is not a war memorial, but is inscribed: "In memory of Dugald Buchanan the Rannoch schoolmaster, evangelist and sacred poet, died 24th June 1768". The memorial is dated 1875.

Rannoch's clans had played a full part in the Jacobite uprisings. All those the troops believed to be rebels were killed, as were some non-combatants, 'rebellious' settlements were burned and livestock was confiscated on a large scale. Some in the highland Jacobite regions survived the ravaging of the countryside by King George's forces only to starve the following winter.

When the reprisals ceased, the warriors returned. However, without crops or cattle, there seemed no alternative open to them but thieving, and sheer hunger drove them to commit savage deeds. A Captain Patton of Guise's Regiment said 'the people of this country (Rannoch) are the greatest thieves in Scotland and were all in the late rebellion, except for a few. They have a great number of arms but they keep them concealed from us.'

Though traumatised by the violent history of the times in which he lived, his passions ultimately turned to the spiritual and the poetic, as L. Macbean commented: 'Though Buchanan himself had not espoused the Jacobite cause, this cold-bloodcd massacre of his friends roused the old Highlander in him, and for a time not even his new-found religion could banish wild thoughts of revenge from his mind. However, after a mental conflict that continued for years, the genius of Christianity at last prevailed, and he learned to forgive.' (L. Macbean, "Sketch of the Author's Life" in Dugald Buchanan's Spiritual Songs, Edinburgh, 1884).

== Life ==
Dugald Buchanan was a teacher and an evangelist, preaching at large open air meetings, which upwards of 500 people attended. He showed great courage as he persuaded the 'wild men' of Rannoch to give up their lawlessness and savage ways. He and his wife taught them new trades and crafts. They worked with James Small, formerly an Ensign in Lord Loudoun's Regiment, who had been appointed by the Commissioners for the Forfeited Estates to run the Rannoch estates which had been seized from the clan chieftains who had supported the Jacobites. The tiny hamlet at the east end of Loch Rannoch, now known as Kinloch Rannoch, was enlarged and settled, mainly by soldiers being discharged from the army, but also by displaced crofters.

A wide range of agricultural and other improvement works were undertaken across the estates, including drainage, road making and bridge building. Slowly peace and prosperity were brought to Rannoch. Flax and potatoes were introduced, mills built and spinning and weaving taught; a mason, joiner and wheelwright passed on their skills; a shoemaker and a tailor set up business.

Dugald Buchanan is buried in the Little Leny, Buchanan Burial Enclosure and Burial Ground near Callander, Stirling, Scotland, at the confluence of the Eas Gobhain and Garbh Uisge rivers.

== Work ==
Buchanan was a highly regarded religious poet who, strongly influenced by his reading of English Puritan writings, composed his celebrated Spiritual Hymns in a Scots Gaelic of a high quality that to some extent reflected the language of the classical Gaelic common to the bards of both Ireland and Scotland.

Buchanan and minister James Stuart of Killin, sponsored by the Society in Scotland for Propagating Christian Knowledge (SSPCK), carried out the first translation of the New Testament into Gaelic. Their translation, begun in 1755, was completed and published in 1767. Following the unsuccessful Jacobite rebellion of 1745, the Gaelic language had been proscribed, and all schools in the Highlands were required to teach only in English. Buchanan and Stuart's translation was significant in that it was accompanied by a shift by the SSPCK and other educational authorities back to Gaelic as the language of education of Highland Scottish children. This played a major part in promoting literacy in the language.

Buchanan also translated some English Puritan literature into Gaelic.

Buchanan was considerably impressed by James Macpherson's Ossian (1760–65) and, taking it to be authentic, was moved to revalue the genuine traditions and rich cultural heritage of the Gaels. At around the same time, he wrote to Sir James Clerk of Penicuik, the leading antiquary of the movement, proposing that someone should travel to the Isles and Western Coast of Scotland and collect the work of the ancient and modern bards, in which alone he could find the language in its purity. Much later, in the 19th and 20th centuries, this task was taken up by collectors such as Alexander Carmichael and Lady Evelyn Stewart Murray, and to be recorded and continued by the work of the School of Scottish Studies and the Scottish Gaelic Texts Society.

== Memorial ==
Buchanan is commemorated by a monument erected in The Square at Kinloch Rannoch and by the first church built at the Braes of Rannoch, or Georgetown as it was known at the time, named after King George. This latter name was swiftly changed again after the kings' soldiers' withdrawal from the area.
