= Ballechin distillery =

1810–1927 whisky distillery in Scotland

Coordinates: 56.6622°N 3.7397°W

Region: Highland
- Location: Perthshire, Scotland
- Founded: 1810
- Status: Closed/demolished

Ballechin distillery was a Scotch whisky distillery. It operated between 1810 and 1927. It was one of seven original farm distilleries operating in Perthshire. Out of these seven, Edradour is the only one remaining.

The distillery was located in an estate in Logierait parish, Perthshire, Scotland, located 3 miles (5 kilometres) west north-west of Ballinluig junction. The main residence on the estate was Ballechin House

Later in life the distillery was operated by the Robertson Family. It supplied a large range of customers both locally and to wine merchants in Edinburgh and Glasgow. The distillery eventually closed due to the diversion of the water source and demolished. The trustees were allowed three years to move the bonded stock on.

Since 2002, Edradour have resurrected the Ballechin brand of whisky.

== See also ==
- List of whisky distilleries in Scotland
- List of historic whisky distilleries
