= Donald MacNicol =

Scottish clergyman and writer (1735–1802)

The Rev. Donald MacNicol (Scottish Gaelic: Domhnall MacNeacaill; 1735–1802), was a Scottish clergyman, Church of Scotland minister of Saddell and Lismore in Argyll, and an author. He was the son of Nicol Macnicol of Succoth, Argyll, and the nephew of Alexander Stewart of Invernahyle in the Strath of Appin. He is perhaps best known for his Remarks On Dr. Samuel Johnson's Journey To The Hebrides, a work which commented rather vituperatively on Dr. Johnson's equally insulting A Journey to the Western Islands of Scotland.

The Rev. MacNicol assisted the renowned Gaelic poet, Duncan Ban MacIntyre, by transcribing over 6,000 lines of the illiterate man's work. MacNicol is also remembered for his Gaelic poem for unrequited love, entitled Mo Shùil Ad Dhèidh. (English: "My Eye is After You")

Chorus:

Ochoin a chailin 's mo shùil ad dhèidh
A chailin, mo chailin 's mo shùil ad dhèidh
A Lili, mo Lili 's mo shùil ad dhèidh
Cha lèir dhomh am bealach le sileadh nan deur

English Translation:

Alas, my girl, my eye is after you
Girl, my girl, my eye is after you
Lily, my Lily, my eye is after you
I can't see the mountain pass for the flowing of tears

The thirty-five-year-old Rev. MacNicol wrote the poem as a lament for his unrequited love for Lillias Campbell, a local laird's daughter. He had requested the seventeen-year-old girl's hand in marriage, but Lillias had already accepted the hand of her cousin, Captain Sir Alexander Campbell. However, Sir Alexander made an ungallant bet with a servant which left the incensed Lillias no choice but to break off their engagement and accept the alternate proposal of the local minister. They married just after her eighteenth birthday, and would go on to have sixteen children. His poem was later set to music and remains a popular song in Scottish traditional music.
