= John Du Cameron =

John Du Cameron (Scottish Gaelic: Iain Dubh Camshròn) (executed 23 November 1753) was a Scottish Sergeant in the French Royal Army who came back to Scotland to fight for Prince Charles Edward Stuart during the Jacobite rising of 1745. When the rebellion failed he took to the hills with a band of renegades and fought on until he was captured and hanged in 1753. He is better known by the name of Sergent Mòr (Mòr the Scottish Gaelic for "largeness of size" or "greatness of character").

He was viewed as a brigand, however, by those who opposed him and his victims in the counties in which he operated (Perth, Inverness and Argyle), but a folk hero to those who sympathised with the aims of the rebellion (as shown by the mention of Sergeant Mòr in The Bonnie Banks o' Loch Lomond, a poem by Andrew Lang).

== Capture ==
Cameron, having no fixed abode and facing the consequences of having served in the French army, and also of having supported the Jacobite rising, formed a party of freebooters, and took up his residence in the mountains between the counties of Perth, Inverness and Argyll. He carried on a system of spoliation by carrying off cattle that belonged to people he called his enemies, and also blackmailing people. He had for a long time slept in a barn on the farm of Dunan in Rannoch, but he was betrayed and one night while he was asleep in the barn, in the year 1753, he was apprehended by a party of men led by Hector Munro, 8th laird of Novar. Cameron was a powerful man and shook off all of the soldiers who had hold of him, and attempted to escape. However, he was overpowered by the remainder of the party, who had stayed outside. Cameron was carried to Perth where he was tried for murder as well as for various acts of theft and cattle stealing. He was found guilty and executed at Perth in 1753. It was generally believed locally that Cameron had been betrayed by the man whose barn he had been sleeping in.

== See also ==
- Mosstroopers
