= James Stuart (cleric) =

James Stuart or James Stewart (Scottish Gaelic: Seumas Stiubhairt, 1701–1789) was a Scottish cleric. He was a minister in Killin and worked with poet Dugald Buchanan on the Scottish Gaelic New Testament published in 1767. His son, John Stuart (1743–1821) of Luss, continued to work on the Old Testament published in 1801. His daughter married James McLagan, minister at Amulree.
