= Bible translations into Scottish Gaelic =

The New Testament was first published in Scottish Gaelic in 1767 and the whole Bible (Am Bìoball Gàidhlig) was first published in 1801. Prior to these, Gaels in Scotland had used translations into Irish.

== Book of Common Order ==
The Book of Common Order was translated into Scottish Gaelic by Séon Carsuel (John Carswell), Bishop of the Isles, and printed in 1567. This is considered the first printed book in Scottish Gaelic though the language resembles classical Irish. Dugald Campbell of Knapdale produced a manuscript translation of the Old Testament in 1673, but it was never published. James Kirkwood (1650-1709) promoted Gaelic education and attempted to provide a version of William Bedell's Bible translations into Irish, edited by his friend Robert Kirk (1644–1692), Episcopal minister of Balquhidder and later of Aberfoyle, author of The Secret Commonwealth of Elves, Fauns and Fairies, which failed, though he did succeed in publishing a Psalter in Gaelic (1684).

== Society in Scotland for Propagating Christian Knowledge edition of the Bible ==
It was not until after the final defeat of the Jacobite warriors at Culloden in 1746, that the Society in Scotland for Propagating Christian Knowledge began serious work on a published Bible in Scottish Gaelic and initiated a translation project in 1755. The result of this was the New Testament of James Stuart (1701–1789), minister of Killin, and poet Dugald Buchanan, published in 1767. Stuart worked from the Greek, Buchanan improved the Gaelic. This was followed in 1801 by a full Bible translation with an Old Testament largely by Stuart's son John Stuart of Luss.

== Metrical Psalms ==
The Psalms were translated into Gaelic in metrical form for congregational singing. The full 150 Metrical Psalms called Sailm Dhaibhidh were first published in full in 1694. The General Assembly of the Church of Scotland produced a revised edition in 1826, which is basically the same text that is still used today. The Metrical Psalms of all 150 Hebrew Psalms are often printed at the back of the Bible along with some 67 Paraphrases called Laoidhean o na Sgrioptuiribh Naomha and some 5 Spiritual Songs called Dana Spioradail. This was last printed as a separate edition by the Scottish Bible Society in 1987.

== First Bible Society editions ==
In 1801 the Gaelic Bible was printed by the Society in Scotland for the Propagation of Christian Knowledge (SSPCK). The Gaelic Bible was first printed by the Bible Society in 1807 when the British and Foreign Bible Society (BFBS) printed a corrected edition of the SSPCK text. In 1826 a revision of the Bible was made by the General Assembly of the Church of Scotland and was printed with the Metrical Psalms Sailm Dhaibhidh by SSPCK and BFBS. From 1872 the text was maintained by the National Bible Society of Scotland (NBSS) in Edinburgh, instead of by the British and Foreign Bible Society (BFBS).

== Other translations ==
In the 1830s a translation of the New Testament was made, based on the Latin Vulgate, by Fr. Ewen MacEachen, a Roman Catholic priest from Lochaber, and posthumously published at Aberdeen in 1875. In 1860 the Apocrypha was translated by Alister Macgregor, a minister from Inverness.

== 1902 edition ==
In 1880 the Society in Scotland for Propagating Christian Knowledge (SSPCK) formed a commission to revise the Gaelic Bible. This consisted of both the Established and Free Churches. The commission under the chairmanship of Norman Macleod, included the following well-known Gaelic scholars: - A. Clerk, T. McLauchlan, and N. Dewar, Andrew D. Mackenzie, Robert Blair, John Maclean, Alexander Nicolson, and Donald Mackinnon. By the time the New Testament was completed the affairs of the SSPCK came under the investigation of a Royal Commission, and the work of revision was suspended, to be resumed some 13 years later in 1896. Meanwhile, four of the revisers had died, and the Old Testament was completed by N. Macleod, R. Blair, J. Maclean, and N. Dewar. The result amounts to a fresh translation of the Bible, preserving as far as possible the diction and idiom of the Bible of 1826. In 1902 the new revision of the Bible was adopted by the National Bible Society of Scotland (now called the Scottish Bible Society).

== Today's Gaelic version ==
In 1980 the Bible Society produced An Deagh Sgeul aig Marcus which was the Gospel of Mark in Today's Gaelic Version (TGV). It was translated by Kenneth McDonald, Donald Meek, Donald Gillies and Roderick MacLeod. In 1986 the Bible Society produced Facal as a' Phriosan which was a translation of Paul's Letters from Prison to the Ephesians, Philippians, Colossians and Philemon. It was translated by Kenneth MacDonald, Calum Matheson and Donald Meek.

== Recent Bible Society editions ==
In 1992 a new edition of the Bible was printed by the Scottish Bible Society Comann-Bhìoball Dùthchail na h-Alba. This was an orthographic revision of the 1902 Bible by Donald Meek, and also included an updated edition of the Metrical Psalms. In 2000 another edition of the Bible was produced which included an orthographic revision of the 1826 Metrical Psalms. In 2002 a diglot New Testament was published by the Scottish Bible Society of the 2000 edition of the Gaelic New Testament and the English New King James Version.

== New translation ==
In 2009 a new Gaelic translation of the New Testament was started by the Scottish Bible Society called Eadar-theangachadh Ùr The aim is to translate the Bible into modern everyday Scots Gaelic. The translation team comprises translators from the Church of Scotland, Free Church of Scotland, Methodist Church and Catholic Church in Scotland. The translation aims to combine faithfulness to the Koine Greek original with vocabulary in normal use, and clarity with dignity. This fresh translation is aimed at a younger generation. Soisgeul Eòin - The Gospel of John was published in 2010 and launched at the Gaelic Mòd in Thurso. The New Testament An Tiomnadh Nuadh was completed in 2017. In 2022 an audio version was produced.

== Digital editions ==
The Scots Gaelic Bible was digitised by the Scottish Bible Society for the production of the New Testament diglot with the English NKJV in 2002. In 2016 Scots Gaelic Scriptures were placed online on BibleSearch (Bibles.org) and YouVersion. As well as the main Bible digitised editions of the Metrical Psalms, and the New Testament from 2017 in the new translation are also available.
