= Duncan Ban MacIntyre =

Scottish Gaelic poet (1724–1812)

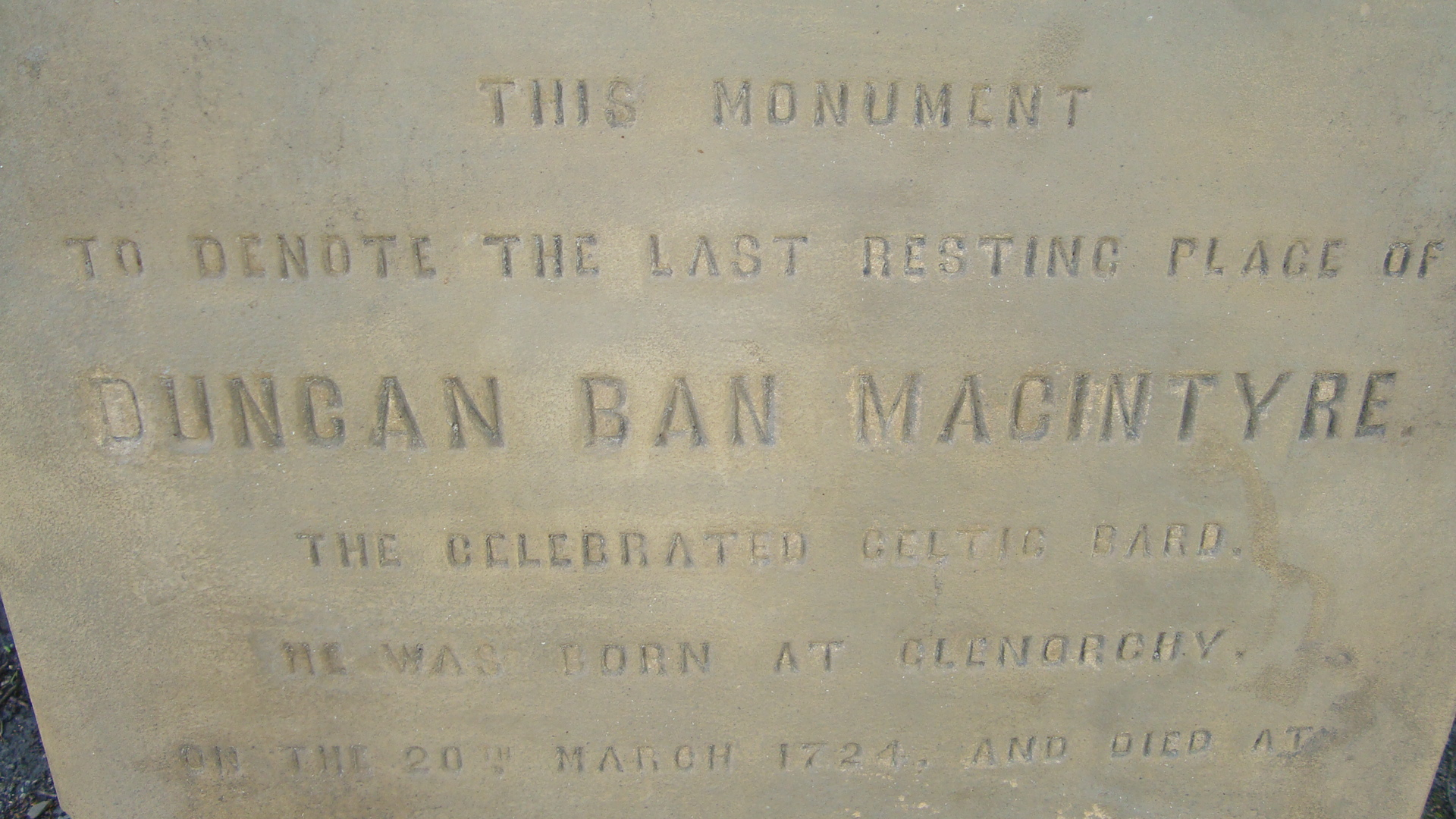
Duncan Ban MacIntyre Memorial, Greyfriars Kirkyard

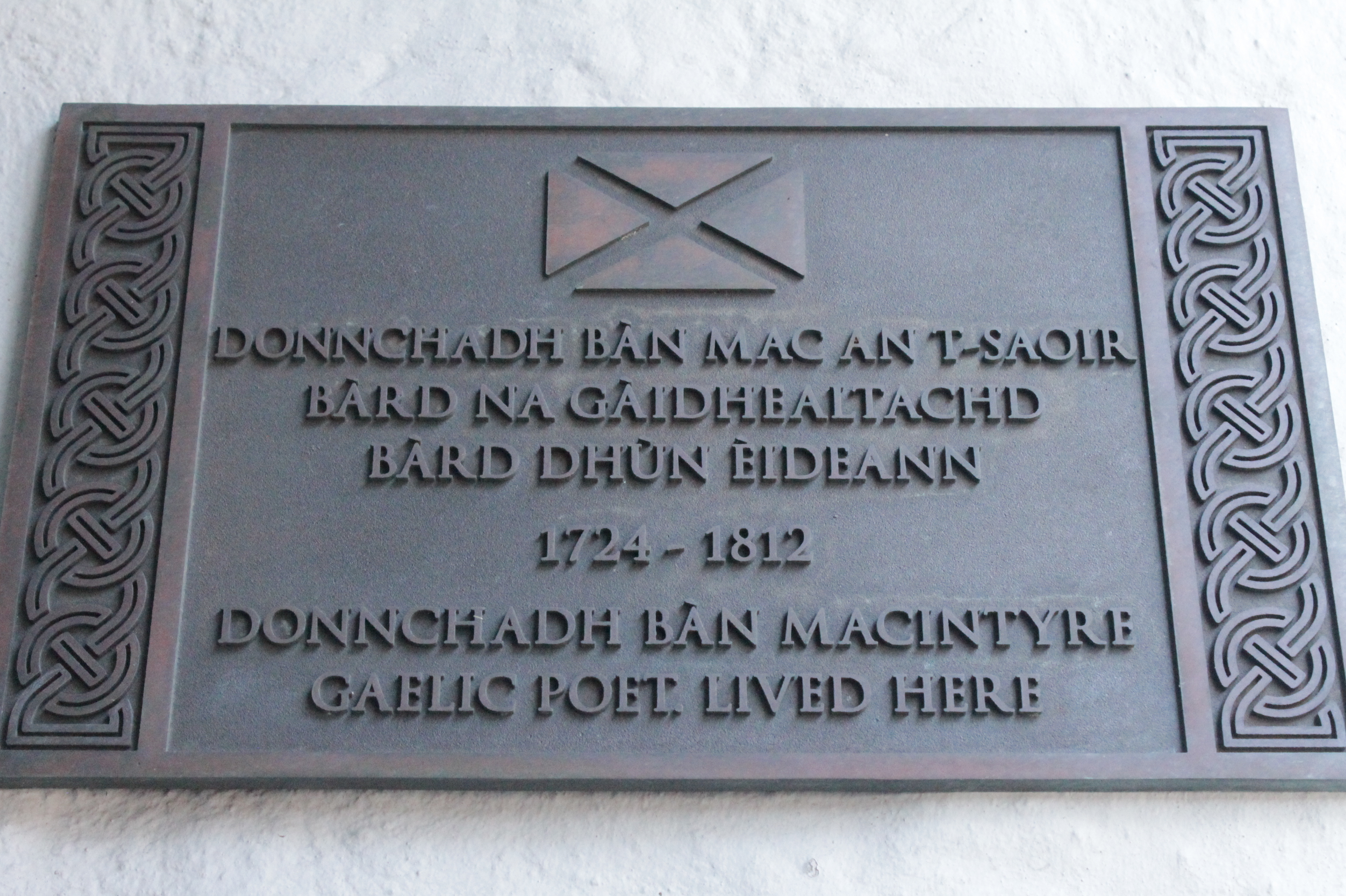
Plaque to Duncan Ban MacIntyre, Roxburgh Close, Edinburgh

Donnchadh Bàn Mac an t-Saoir, anglicized as Duncan Ban MacIntyre (20 March 1724 – 14 May 1812), was one of the most renowned of Scottish Gaelic poets. He formed an integral part of one of the golden ages of Gaelic poetry in Scotland during the 18th century.

== Life ==
Born in Druim Liaghart in Glen Orchy, he went on to work in various occupations, including as a soldier in the Campbell of Argyll Militia, as a forester, and as a constable of Edinburgh City Guard. While a soldier in the Argyll regiment he fought for the Hanoverian forces during the Jacobite rising of 1745–6. He took part in the Battle of Falkirk as a substitute for a local gentleman, Archibald Fletcher of Crannach, and managed to lose his sword during the fighting — an event which would later lead to the composition of a humorous poem about the battle.

When he returned from the battle, MacIntyre was refused his pay by the gentleman who had commissioned him to fight in his stead because of the lost sword and it was in reply that MacIntyre composed the aforementioned poem, satirising the gentleman and the sword he had lost.

MacIntyre moved to Edinburgh in 1767 and was to spend the rest of his life there serving with the Breadalbane Fencibles and the City Guard before retiring in 1806. During his time in Edinburgh he composed several prize winning poems and attempted to win the place of Bard to the Highland and Agricultural Society, losing to Donald Shaw despite receiving much praise for his poetry.

== Poetry ==
MacIntyre's native region had no school and he remained illiterate throughout his life and kept his work by memory. Initially his work was memorized and transmitted orally, and later written down by the minister of Lismore, Donald MacNicol. MacIntyre’s poetry would later be translated into English by such notable figures as Hugh MacDiarmid, Derick Thomson and Iain Crichton Smith.

Most of his poetry is descriptive and the influence of his contemporary, Alasdair MacMhaighstir Alasdair, is notable in much of it. Despite the Jacobite upheavals that wracked Scotland during his lifetime it was his experience as a gamekeeper in Argyll and Perthshire in the employ of the Duke of Argyll which had greatest impact upon his poetry. His greatest work, Moladh Beinn Dòbhrain, stems from this period. The significance of MacIntyre's nature themed poetry is such that it has, along with that of the aforementioned MacMhaighstir Alasdair, been described as "the zenith of Gaelic nature poetry".

== Commemoration ==
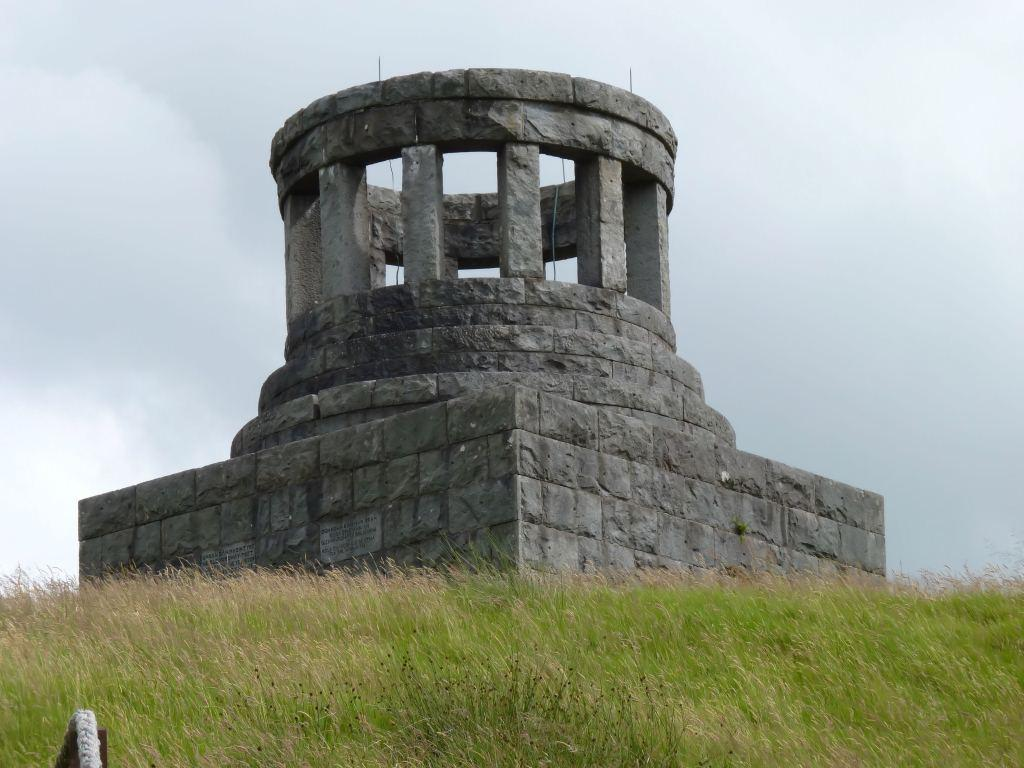
Dalmally Memorial by John Thomas Rochead

He died in Edinburgh on 14 May 1812. He was buried in Greyfriars Kirkyard in Edinburgh. A memorial was erected to his memory several years later, having been erected by friends and well-wishers of the man who had gained fame during his lifetime as Donnchadh Bàn nan Òran or "Fair Duncan of the Songs". The monument is poorly repaired in cement, losing much of its original detail.

Another monument, designed by John Thomas Rochead, was erected to honour MacIntyre in the hills near Dalmally, overlooking Loch Awe. The monument was built following a public subscription in 1859.

The anti-racist and anti-colonialist poet Duncan Livingstone, a major figure in 20th-century Scottish Gaelic literature, grew up being told that his mother, Jane MacIntyre (Sine nighean Donnchaidh mhic Iain) (1845–1938), a native of Ballachulish, was the grandniece of Duncan Ban MacIntyre.
