= Glen Quaich =

Glen in Perth and Kinross, Scotland

Coordinates: 56.54°N 3.90°W

Glen Quaich is a glen in Perth and Kinross and is situated almost midway between Crieff and Aberfeldy. The upper reaches of the glen approach Loch Tay to the west whilst to the south-east, the lower part of the glen contains Loch Freuchie. The glen then continues eastward before opening out onto Strathbraan and the village of Amulree.

The glen takes its name from its bowl-like similarity to a quaich, Scottish Gaelic cuach, meaning cup or bowl.
