= Loch Freuchie =

Lake in Perth and Kinross, Scotland

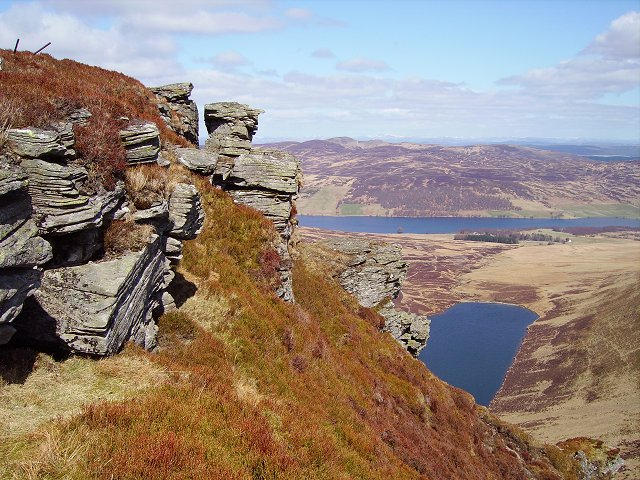
- Loch a' Mhuilinn and Loch Freuchie from a pinnacle below the summit of Creag Grianain.

- Location within Perth and Kinross
- Location: NN86433773
- Coordinates: 56.51789856°N 3.84823699°W
- Type: freshwater loch
- Primary inflows: River Quaich
- Primary outflows: River Quaich to River Braan
- Catchment area: 6,067 ha (14,990 acres)
- Max. length: 2.8163 km (1.7500 mi)
- Max. width: 0.80 km (0.50 mi)
- Surface area: 139 ha (340 acres)
- Average depth: 23 ft (7.0 m)
- Max. depth: 62 ft (19 m)
- Water volume: 344,329,583 ft^{3} (9,750,328.0 m^{3})
- Shore length^{1}: 7 km (4.3 mi)
- Surface elevation: 264 m (866 ft)
- Max. temperature: 58.6 °F (14.8 °C)
- Min. temperature: 49.4 °F (9.7 °C)
- Islands: 0
- ^{1} Shore length is not a well-defined measure.

Loch Freuchie, also known as Fraoch, the heathery loch, is a large freshwater loch on a north-west to south-east orientation, within Glen Quaich in Perth and Kinross. The loch is located 2 miles (3.2 km) west of Amulree and 6.5 miles (10.5 km) southeast of Kenmore.

== History ==
Robert Burns passed beside the loch during his tour of the Highlands in the summer of 1787.

== Geography ==
Loch Freuchie is a loch in a pastoral setting surrounded by green fields and patches of woodlands. The loch contains the remains of a crannog that is located on the southwest shore of the loch. The remains are exposed to a height of 6 ft (1.8 m) and measures around 108 ft (33 m) on an east to west bearing by 57.41 ft (17.50 m). The island has been planted with conifers. To the south-west of the loch at a distance of 2.5 miles is the mountain of Beinn na Gainimh at 730 m (2,400 ft). Almost exactly in the opposite direction at the same distance to the north-west is the mountain of Meall Dearg at 690 m (2,260 ft). River Quaich, sometimes known as River Freuchie to anglers flows into the loch and out before becoming River Braan that flow into the Tay. On the eastern shoreline is the remain of a township.

Loch Freuchie is a trout-fishing loch.

== Gallery ==
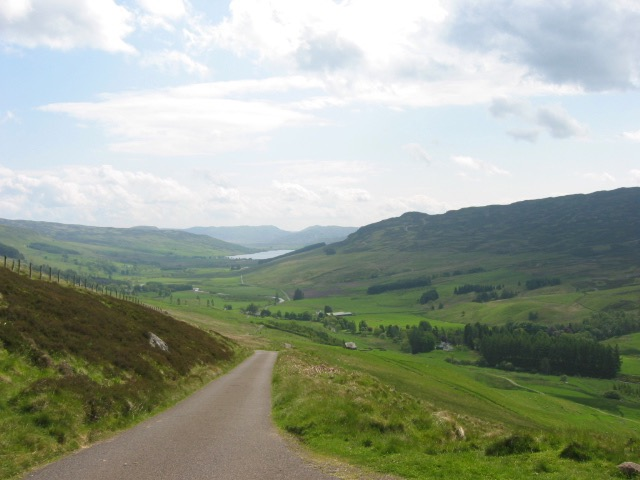
Loch Freuchie viewed from above Garrow, just over two miles to the northwest

== See also ==
- List of lochs in Scotland
