= A. E. Robertson =

Scottish minister and mountaineer (1870–1958)

The Rev. A. E. Robertson FRSE FRSSA FRSGS

Personal life
- Born: Archibald Eneas Robertson; 3 July 1870 Helensburgh, Scotland, UKGBI
- Died: 22 June 1958 (aged 87) Edinburgh, Scotland, UK
- Spouse: Katherine Clayson McFarlane (died 1935); Winifred Dorothy Hutchison
- Education: University of Glasgow; MA, 1892; BD, 1896
- Other name: Archie Eneas Robertson

Religious life
- Religion: Church of Scotland

The Rev. Archibald "Archie" Eneas Robertson FRSE FRSSA FRSGS (3 July 1870 – 22 June 1958) was a Scottish minister of the Church of Scotland and mountaineer. Robertson is generally regarded as being the first mountaineer to climb all 282 Munros, the peaks of Scotland over 3,000 feet (910 m) in height, first listed by Sir Hugh Munro.

== Life ==
Robertson was born on 3 July 1870 in Helensburgh, the son of a prosperous merchant then educated at Glasgow Academy. He then studied divinity at University of Glasgow, graduating MA in 1892 and BD in 1896.

From 1897 to 1906 he assisted in churches in Edinburgh and Musselburgh.

In 1907 Robertson became minister of Braes of Rannoch (near the Bridge of Gaur, on the River Gaur) where he made an effort to learn Scottish Gaelic, to deliver his sermons in Gaelic and try to keep the language alive.

The Reverend was known for his woodwork skills and crafted the altar at the Kirk and the door frames and bannisters at the manse (now a private residence called Craigriach).

In 1918 he moved to Edinburgh as chaplain of Astley Ainslie Hospital. In 1946 he was elected a fellow of the Royal Society of Edinburgh. His proposers were Ian Bartholomew, Murray Macgregor, James Ernest Richey, Thomas Cooper, 1st Baron Cooper of Culross, Douglas Guthrie and James Ritchie.

He was president of the Scottish Mountaineering Club 1930–32. In 1946 he became the first president of the Scottish Rights of Way Society.

== Climbing reputation ==
He climbed his first Munro in 1889. He joined the Scottish Mountaineering Club in 1893.

Doubts have been expressed about whether he climbed Ben Wyvis, and he did not climb the Inaccessible Pinnacle. He admitted turning back on Ben Wyvis because of adverse weather, and it is not known whether he climbed it again. The Inaccessible Pinnacle was not classified as a Munro in 1901, only its parent peak Sgùrr Dearg, which is slightly lower.

Robertson's final Munro was Meall Dearg on Aonach Eagach in Glen Coe. On reaching the summit, he famously kissed the cairn and then his wife. They then consumed a quart of Ayala champagne.

== Personal life ==
He married twice: first to Katherine Clayson McFarlane, then, following her death in 1935, he married Winifred Dorothy Hutchison.

He died at home in Edinburgh on 22 June 1958.
