= Rannoch =

Area of the Scottish Highlands

Coordinates: 56.667°N 4.333°W

Approximate location of Rannoch

Rannoch (Scottish Gaelic: Raineach or Raithneach, meaning 'bracken') is an area of the Scottish Highlands between the A9 road, to the east, and the A82, to the west. The area is crossed from south to north by the West Highland railway line.

Features of the area include Loch Rannoch and Rannoch Moor. The loch is in the northwest of the council area of Perth and Kinross. The moor extends further west, into the south of the Highland council area.

The moor is partly within the catchment basin of the loch. The loch itself drains to the east, via the River Tummel into the River Tay.

The railway links Rannoch station and Corrour station with Fort William in the north and Glasgow in the south. Via the north bank of Loch Rannoch the B846 road links Rannoch station with the A9 between Pitlochry and Blair Atholl. Corrour station is remote from any public road.

The village of Kinloch Rannoch is on the B846 at the eastern (River Tummel) end of the loch.

== Map references ==
Place	Ordnance Survey grid reference
Kinloch Rannoch	NN661586
Rannoch station	NN422578
Corrour station	NN356663
