= Amulree =

Coordinates: 56.5084°N 3.7896°W

Amulree: Scottish Gaelic: Àth Maol Ruibhe
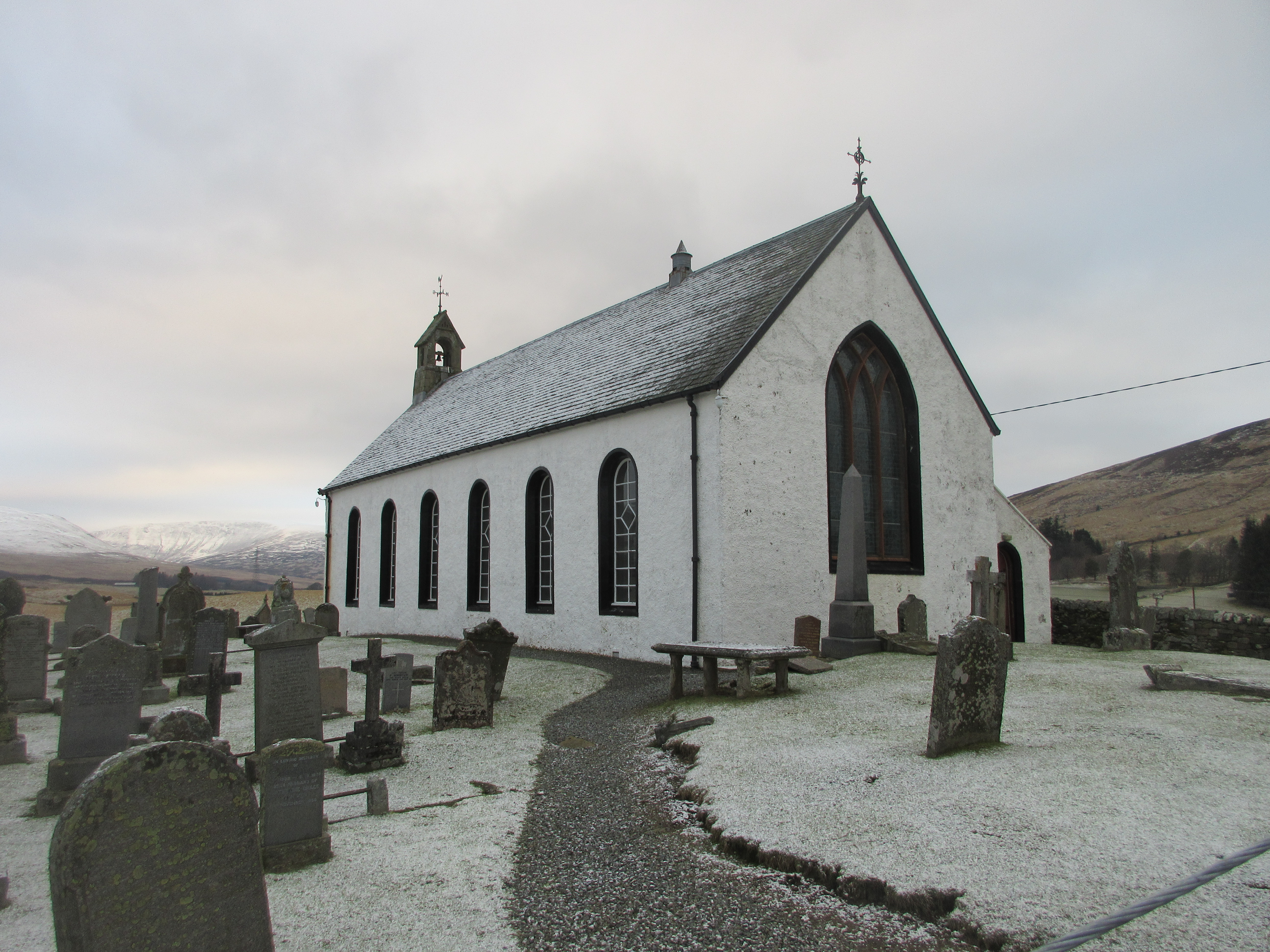
- Amulree and Strathbraan Church

- Location within Perth and Kinross
- OS grid reference: NN890365
- Council area: Perth and Kinross
- Country: Scotland
- Sovereign state: United Kingdom
- Post town: DUNKELD
- Postcode district: PH8
- Police: Scotland
- Fire: Scottish
- Ambulance: Scottish
- UK Parliament: Angus and Perthshire Glens
- Scottish Parliament: Perthshire North

Amulree (Scottish Gaelic: Àth Maol Ruibhe, 'Ford of [St.] Maelrubha') is a small hamlet in Perth and Kinross, Scotland. It lies in hilly country on the A822 road, one kilometre (one-half mile) east of Loch Freuchie in Strathbraan, eight kilometres (5 mi) west of Dunkeld and ten kilometres (6 mi) north of Crieff. It lies close to the geographical centre of Scotland.

Its parish church contains records of the large number of people who stayed there prior to mass emigration to North Easthope, Canada, in the early 19th century, where a settlement (Amulree, Ontario) was named after it. The church is linked to the Aberfeldy Parish Church. A history of the hamlet, titled Amulree and its Church, was written in 1990 by resident Nancy Countess of Enniskille, the American-born second wife of the 6th Earl of Enniskillen. A notable minister was James McLagan.

The River Braan flows past Amulree from Loch Freuchie.
