= Rutland (disambiguation) =

Rutland is a county in England.

Rutland may also refer to:

== Places ==
- Rutland Island, an island in the Andaman and Nicobar Islands in the Indian Ocean

=== Canada ===
- Rutland Park, Calgary, a neighbourhood of Calgary, Alberta, Canada
- Rutland, British Columbia, a neighbourhood of Kelowna, British Columbia, Canada
- Rutland, Saskatchewan, a community in Saskatchewan, Canada

=== Ireland ===
- Rutland Island, County Donegal, an island and electoral district in County Donegal

=== Saint Vincent and the Grenadines ===
- Rutland River, a river

=== United Kingdom ===
- Rutland (constituency), a former constituency
- Rutland Water, a lake in Rutland, England

=== United States ===
- Rutland, Illinois
- Rutland, Iowa
- Rutland, Kentucky
- Rutland, Massachusetts, a New England town
  - Rutland (CDP), Massachusetts, the main village in the town
- Rutland, New York
- Rutland, North Dakota
- Rutland, Ohio
- Rutland, South Dakota
- Rutland, Vermont (disambiguation)
  - Rutland (city), Vermont, the largest US city named Rutland
  - Rutland (town), Vermont
- Rutland County, Vermont
- Rutland, Wisconsin, a town
  - Rutland (community), Wisconsin, an unincorporated community
- Rutland Township (disambiguation)

== Other uses ==
- Rutland Railroad, which served the New England states of the United States
- Rutland State Airport, an airport in Rutland, Vermont
- Duke of Rutland, derived from the county in England
- Mr Rutland, a male osprey who nested near Rutland Water, England

== People with the name ==
- Frederick Rutland (1886-1949), British aviator
- Mark Rutland (born 1947), American missionary
- Nona Rutland (1907–1980), American horsewoman
- Patti Rutland, American choreographer
- Rutland Barrington (1853-1922), British entertainer
- Rutland Boughton (1878-1960), British composer
- Tom Rutland (born 1992), British politician
