= Loch of Craiglush =

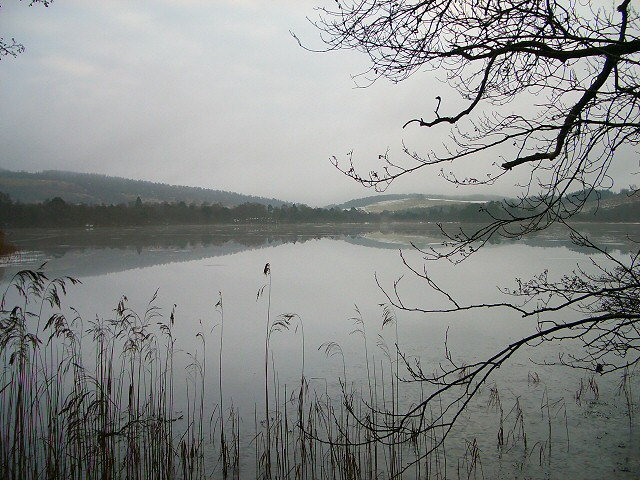
- Loch of Craiglush in the winter

- Location within Perth and Kinross
- Location: NO043443
- Coordinates: 56.581°N 3.5587°W
- Type: freshwater loch
- Primary inflows: Lunan Burn
- Primary outflows: Lunan Burn
- Catchment area: 14.9 km^{2} (3,680 acres)
- Surface area: 26.3 ha (65 acres)
- Average depth: 4.9 m (16 ft)
- Max. depth: 13 m (44 ft)
- Water volume: 138,980 m^{3} (4,907,900 ft^{3})
- Shore length^{1}: 2.3 km (1.4 mi)
- Surface elevation: 103 m (338 ft)
- Max. temperature: 16.2 °C (61.2 °F)
- Min. temperature: 9.4 °C (49.0 °F)
- Islands: 1
- ^{1} Shore length is not a well-defined measure.

Loch of Craiglush is a freshwater loch, located around 1 1/2 miles (2.4 km) north-east of Dunkeld in Perth and Kinross, Scotland. The loch is a designated Site of Special Scientific Interest (SSSI), as well as forming part of a Special Area of Conservation.

== Fishing ==
Loch of Craiglush, Loch of the Lowes, Loch of Butterstone, Loch of Clunie, Loch of Drumellie, Loch Rae, Fingask Loch, Loch White and Loch Black and the Stormont Loch form a series of lochs all draining into the Lunan Burn, which flows into the River Isla before its junction with the River Tay. All these rivers contain pike and perch and trout are taken in Lochs Craiglush, Lowes and Butterstone.
