= Ospreys in Britain =

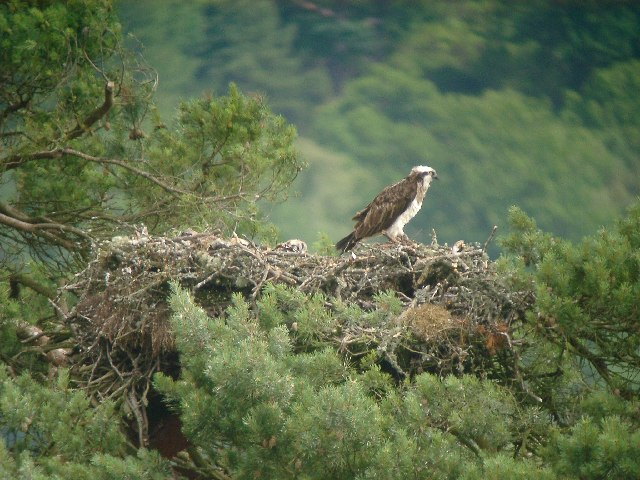
An osprey on nest at Loch of the Lowes, Scotland

The osprey (Pandion haliaetus) is a medium-large raptor which is a specialist fish-eater with a worldwide distribution. The subspecies Pandion haliaetus haliaetus is native to Eurasia and is found in the British Isles, where it is a scarce breeder primarily in Scotland, with smaller numbers in England and Wales. It became extinct in the British Isles in 1916, but recolonised in 1954. Scandinavian birds migrate through Britain on the way to their breeding sites.

== History ==
The osprey formerly inhabited much of Britain, but heavy persecution, mainly by Victorian egg and skin collectors, during the 19th and early 20th centuries brought about its demise. The osprey became extinct as a breeding bird in England in 1840. It is generally considered that the species was absent from Scotland from 1916 to 1954, although there is some evidence that it continued to breed in Strathspey in the 1930s and 40s. It is not thought to have inhabited Wales at that time: in Ireland it appears to have died out in the early 19th century.

The British population has grown from 2 known breeding pairs in 1967 to 150 pairs in 2000, 250 pairs in 2018, and a most recent estimate in 2023 of nearly 300 pairs.

== Recolonisation ==
=== Recolonisation of Scotland ===
In 1954 Scandinavian birds recolonised Scotland naturally, and a pair has nested successfully almost every year since 1959 at Loch Garten Osprey Centre, Abernethy Forest Reserve, in the Scottish Highlands. This osprey centre has become one of the most well-known conservation sites in the UK, and has attracted over 2 million visitors since 1959.

The early recolonisation was very slow because of contamination of the food chain by organochlorine pesticides and the activities of egg collectors. To protect the birds and increase their survival rates, "Operation Osprey" was launched. Barbed wire and electric wires were placed around the trees where the birds nested, and a watch was kept over them through the night.

Some chicks from Scottish nests have been moved to England and Spain (Urdaibai Bird Center) to establish new breeding populations.

In 2022 Sacha Dench led a project which followed three satellite-tagged juvenile ospreys from the osprey project in the Tweed Valley Forest Park on their first migration south. Two of the young ospreys perished; the third was reported in November 2022 to be in Spain.

The population in Scotland was estimated at 250 breeding pairs in 2023. .

=== Reintroduction to England ===
Because of the slow geographical spread of breeding ospreys within Scotland, in 1996 English Nature and Scottish Natural Heritage licensed a project to re-introduce the osprey to central England. Over six years, chicks from Scottish nests were moved to the Nature Reserve at Rutland Water in the Midlands area, where they were released. Funding was provided by Anglian Water and the Leicestershire and Rutland Wildlife Trust managed the project supported by a large team of volunteers.

In 1999 some of the translocated birds returned after their migration from Africa and in 2001 the first pair bred, including the eponymous Mr Rutland. In 2022 there were 26 adult ospreys and up to 10 breeding pairs in the area of Rutland Water. In 2025 the project announced that 300 chicks had now fledged since the first in 2001.

=== Recolonisation of England ===
In 1999 a pair from the Scottish population bred for the first time in the Lake District at Bassenthwaite Lake. In 2021 there were 6 established nests in the Lake District where ospreys raised a total of 15 chicks.

In June 2009 a pair produced three young at Kielder Forest; these are the first to breed at Kielder for over 200 years. In 2023 eleven chicks fledged from nests at Kielder, making a total over the life of the project of 115.

In 2017 a project was started to reintroduce ospreys to the Poole Harbour area. The first egg at a nest site put in place by the project was laid in 2022. Two chicks hatched in early June 2022 and were ringed in July. One of the chicks died in August after a predation attempt by a goshawk. in 2025 a pair of ospreys hatched two chicks from a second nest in the Poole Harbour area.

In 2022 further locations where ospreys had bred successfully for the first time were made public in North Yorkshire and Leicestershire.

In June 2025 the first breeding pair in the East of England since reintroduction were confirmed at Ranworth Broad in Norfolk

=== Recolonisation of Wales ===
An unexpected result of the Rutland translocation project was the establishment of two nests in Wales in 2004. One was near Welshpool in Montgomeryshire and the other at the RSPB Glaslyn Osprey Project at Pont Croesor, near Porthmadog in north Wales. In both cases the adult male, although originally from Scotland, had been translocated to Rutland. In 2022 the female osprey at Glaslyn returned for a 19th breeding season at the site, from which she has raised 41 young. The Glaslyn female did not return from migration in 2023, but a new female joined the established male at the nest and successful breeding continued at the site.

In 2011 the Dyfi Osprey Project reported that an unringed male osprey and a female which fledged from Rutland Water in 2008 had successfully raised chicks at a new nest site near the river Dyfi in Wales. By the end of 2019 the project had raised 19 chicks.

In 2012 a new nest was reported in Snowdonia, and a single chick hatched successfully. Since 2014 ospreys have been nesting successfully near Clywedog Reservoir in Powys, and in 2018 a pair nested successfully for the first time at Llyn Brenig. In 2023 a nest was found further south in Wales near Talybont on Usk.

=== Legal protection ===
Ospreys are a species listed in Schedule 1 of the Wildlife and Countryside Act 1981. Offences under this Act include taking or owning eggs, damaging the birds or the nesting sites, and "intentionally or recklessly disturbing the bird while it is building a nest or is in, on or near a nest containing eggs or young or disturbing dependent young of such a bird".

=== Viewing and tracking ===
The websites of the wildlife organisations which protect and manage access to the nest sites at Loch Garten, Rutland Water, the Woodland Trust's Loch Arkaig, WWT Caerlaverock, Scottish Wildlife Trust at Loch of the Lowes and Dyfi, stream live webcam pictures of nesting birds during the breeding season (typically April–September). Loch Garten, Dyfi and the Highland Foundation for Wildlife have fitted satellite trackers to some chicks to improve understanding of migratory behaviour. The exact location of many nests is not widely disclosed due to the risk of eggs being stolen by egg collectors which, despite being made illegal in 1981 under the Wildlife and Countryside Act, continues to present a threat to rare nesting birds.

=== Ringing ===
Many ospreys can be identified due to bird ringing carried out under the scheme administered by the British Trust for Ornithology (BTO). Ospreys which have been ringed in Britain in recent years have a BTO metal ring one leg, and field readable blue "Darvic" ring on the other. Any UK sighting of a colour ringed osprey should be reported to the Roy Dennis Wildlife Foundation which coordinates the ringing of the species nationally.
