= Black Loch (Perth and Kinross) =

Small lowland freshwater loch

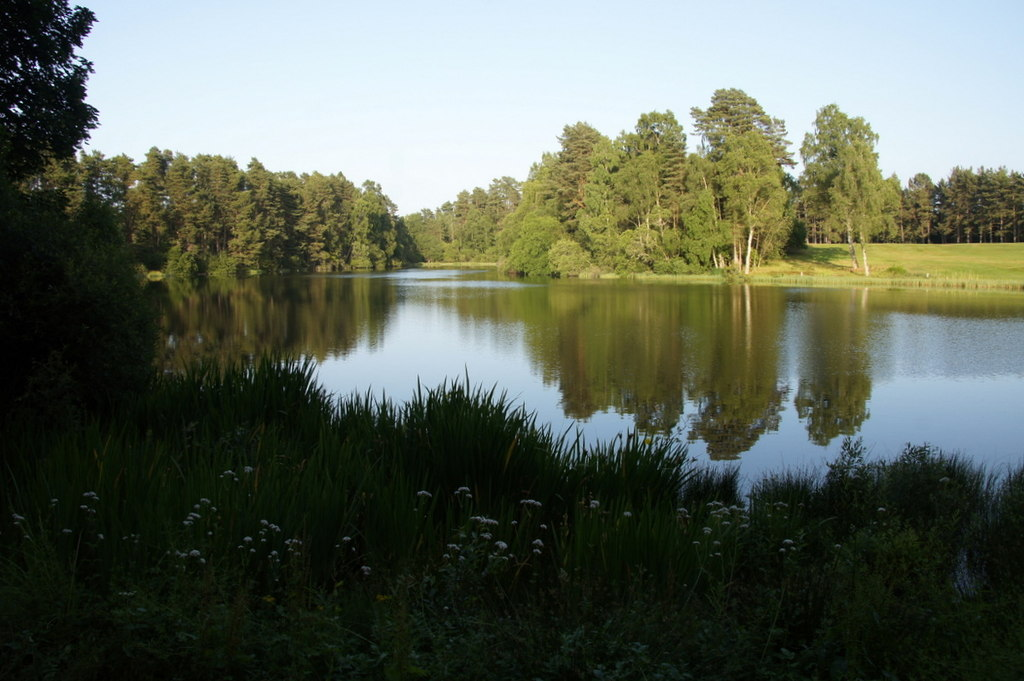
- Black Loch, Carsie, near Blairgowrie

- Location within Perth and Kinross
- Location: NO175427
- Coordinates: 56.569100°N 3.343300°W
- Type: freshwater loch
- Max. length: 0.402 km (0.250 mi)
- Max. width: 0.1609 km (0.1000 mi)
- Surface area: 2.6 ha (6.4 acres)
- Average depth: 4.75 ft (1.45 m)
- Max. depth: 7 ft (2.1 m)
- Water volume: 1,611,000 ft^{3} (45,600 m^{3})
- Shore length^{1}: 0.8 km (0.50 mi)
- Surface elevation: 51 m (167 ft)
- Max. temperature: 60.1 °F (15.6 °C)
- Min. temperature: 57.4 °F (14.1 °C)
- Islands: 0
- ^{1} Shore length is not a well-defined measure.

Black Loch is a small lowland freshwater loch that is located directly to the east of Fingask Loch in the valley of the Lunan Burn and is 1 mile south of Blairgowrie, in Perth and Kinross.

The loch is also a designated Site of Special Scientific Interest (SSSI), as well as forming part of a Special Area of Conservation.

== Geography ==
Black Loch lies to the east of two other small lochs. Directly to the east is White Loch and further east still is Fingask Loch and all within a distance of half a mile. Part of the eastern end of White Loch and all of Black Loch are within the bounds of Blairgowrie Golf Club.

== See also ==
- List of lochs in Scotland
