= Bird hide =

Shelter to observe birds

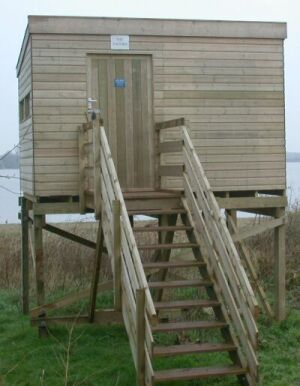
The 'Gazebo' hide at the West Midland Bird Club's Belvide Reservoir reserve.

A bird hide (also known as a blind or bird blind in the US) is a shelter, often camouflaged, used to observe wildlife, especially birds, at close quarters. Hides or hunting blinds were once built chiefly as hunting aids, but are now commonly found in parks and wetlands for the use of birdwatchers and ornithologists.

A typical bird hide resembles a garden shed, with small openings, shutters, or windows built into at least one side to enable observation. However, because birds do not recognize humans as predatory threats unless the human is standing in the open, a bird blind can be little more than a large shed open on one side in which birders stand. Motor vehicles may also act as effective blinds, even with windows open.

== Variants ==
Types of bird hide include:

- tower hides, which have multiple stories and allow observations over large areas.
- bird blinds, which are screens similar to one wall of a typical hide, with or without a roof for shelter.
- machans, covered platforms erected to observe birds and wildlife in high trees or on cliffs, particularly in India where they were originally used by tiger-hunters.
- portable hides, tent-like structures made of fabric arranged on a frame, often used by photographers.
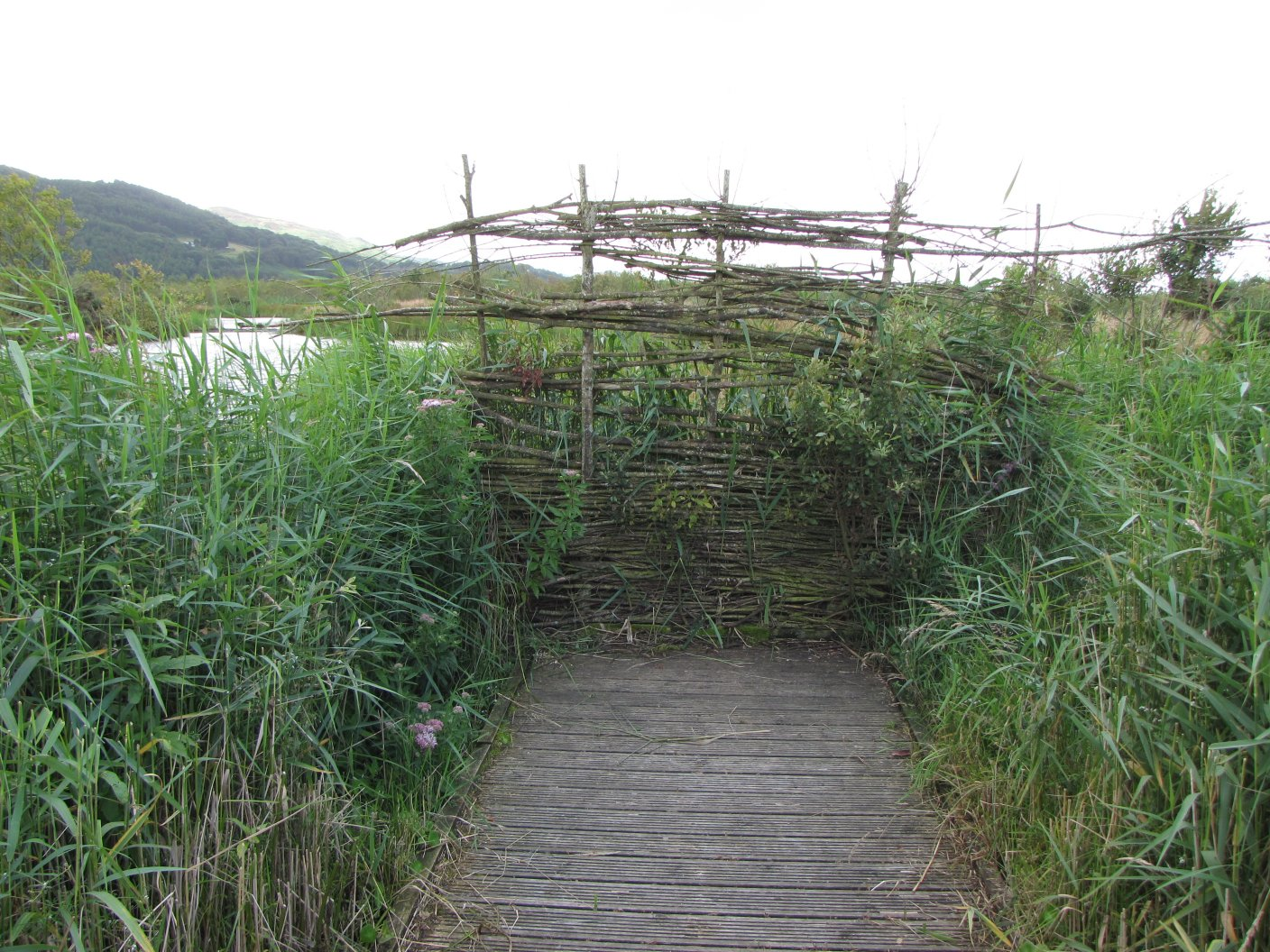
Bird hide in Cors Dyfi nature reserve

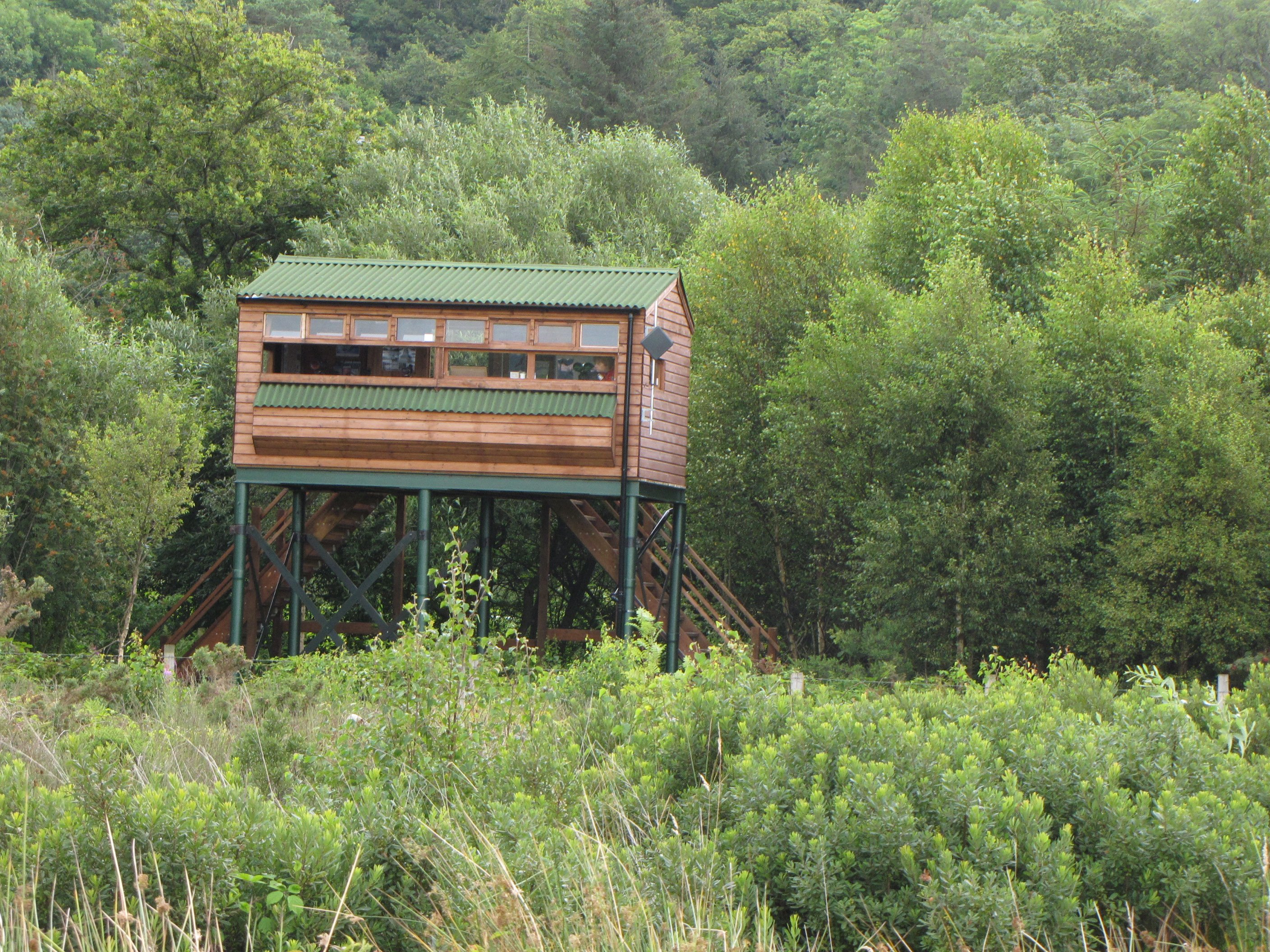
Bird hide in Cors Dyfi nature reserve

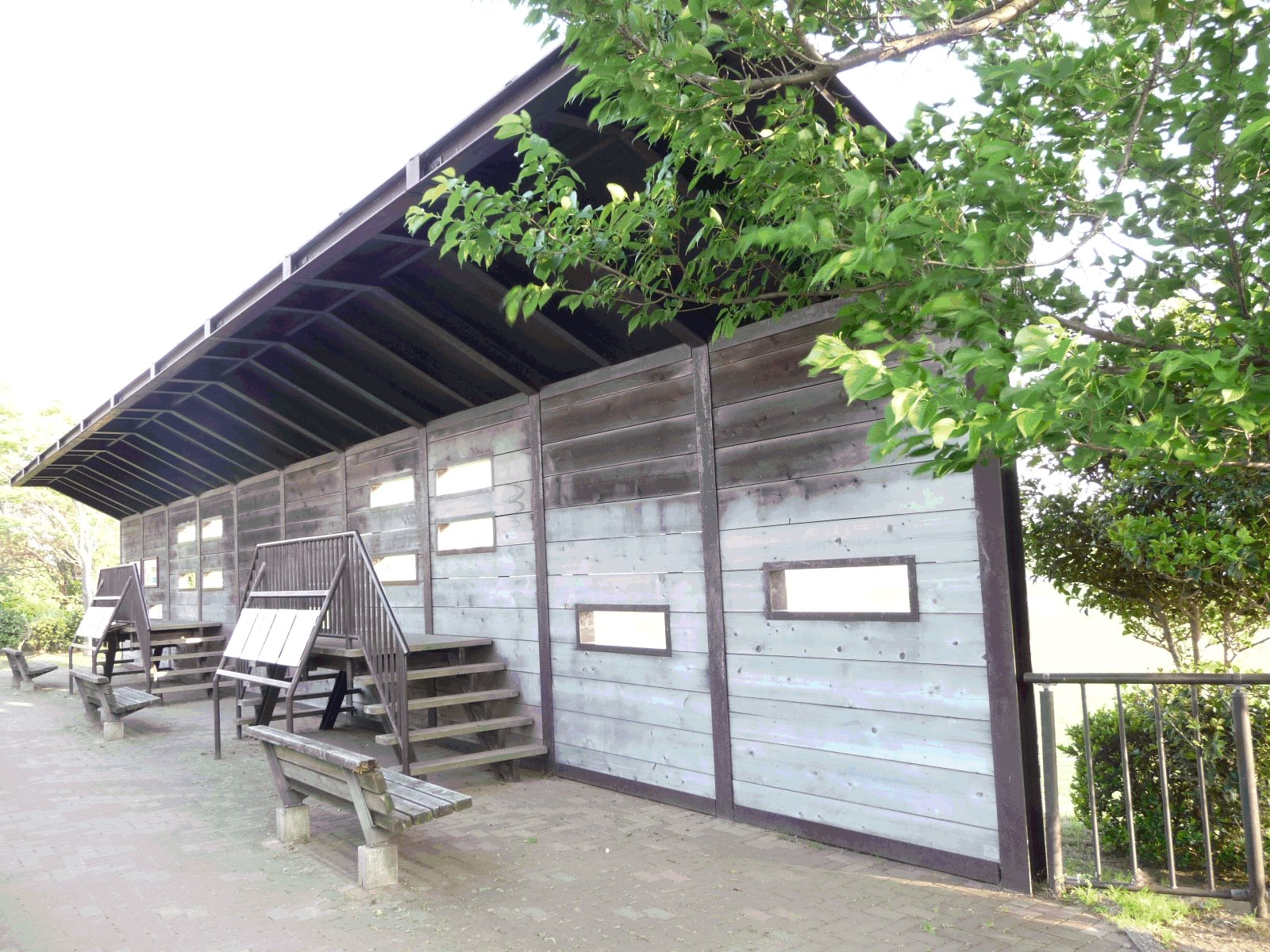
Blind hide in Chiba, Japan

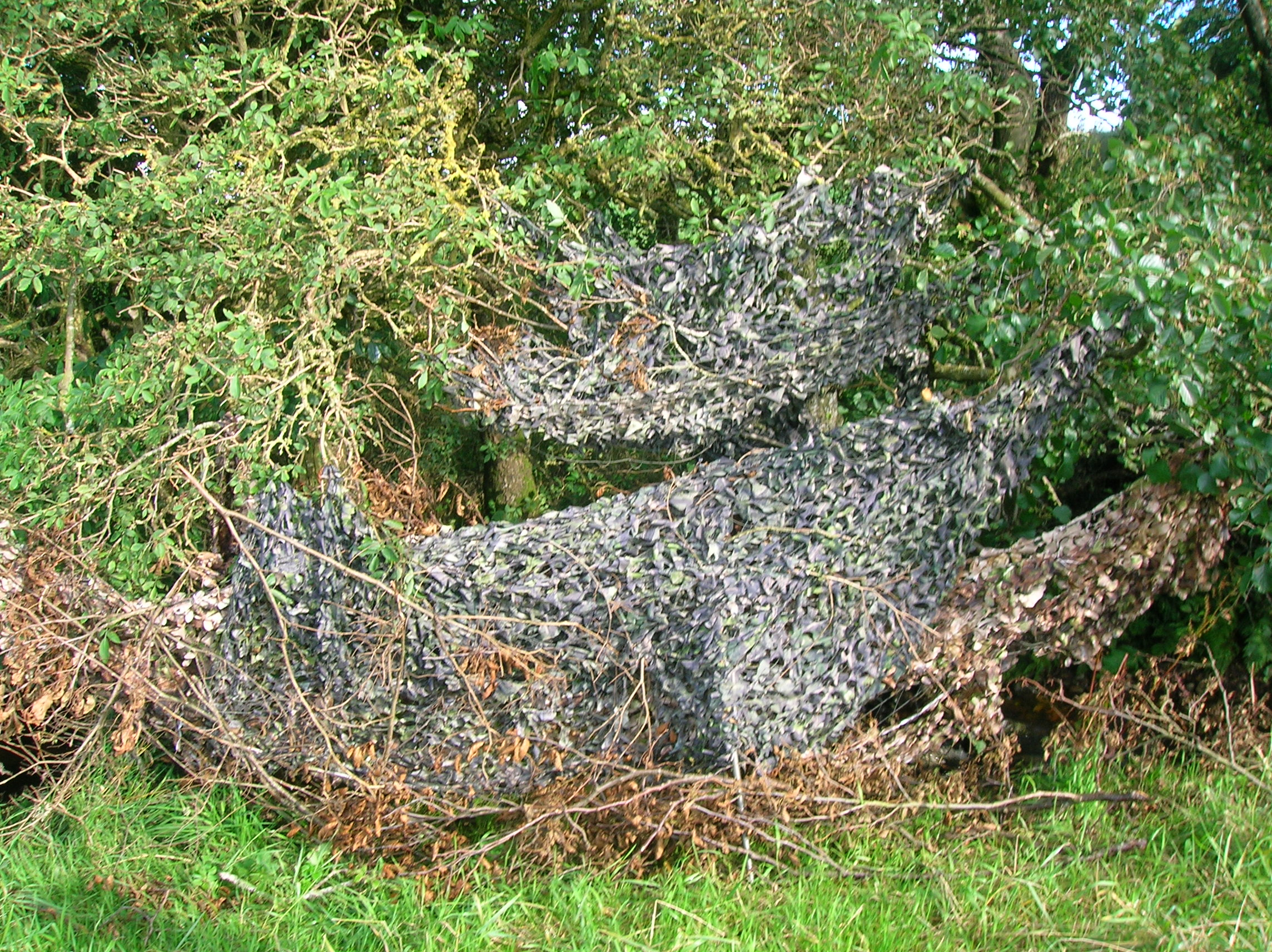
Camouflaged hide in Kerse Castle, East Ayrshire, Scotland

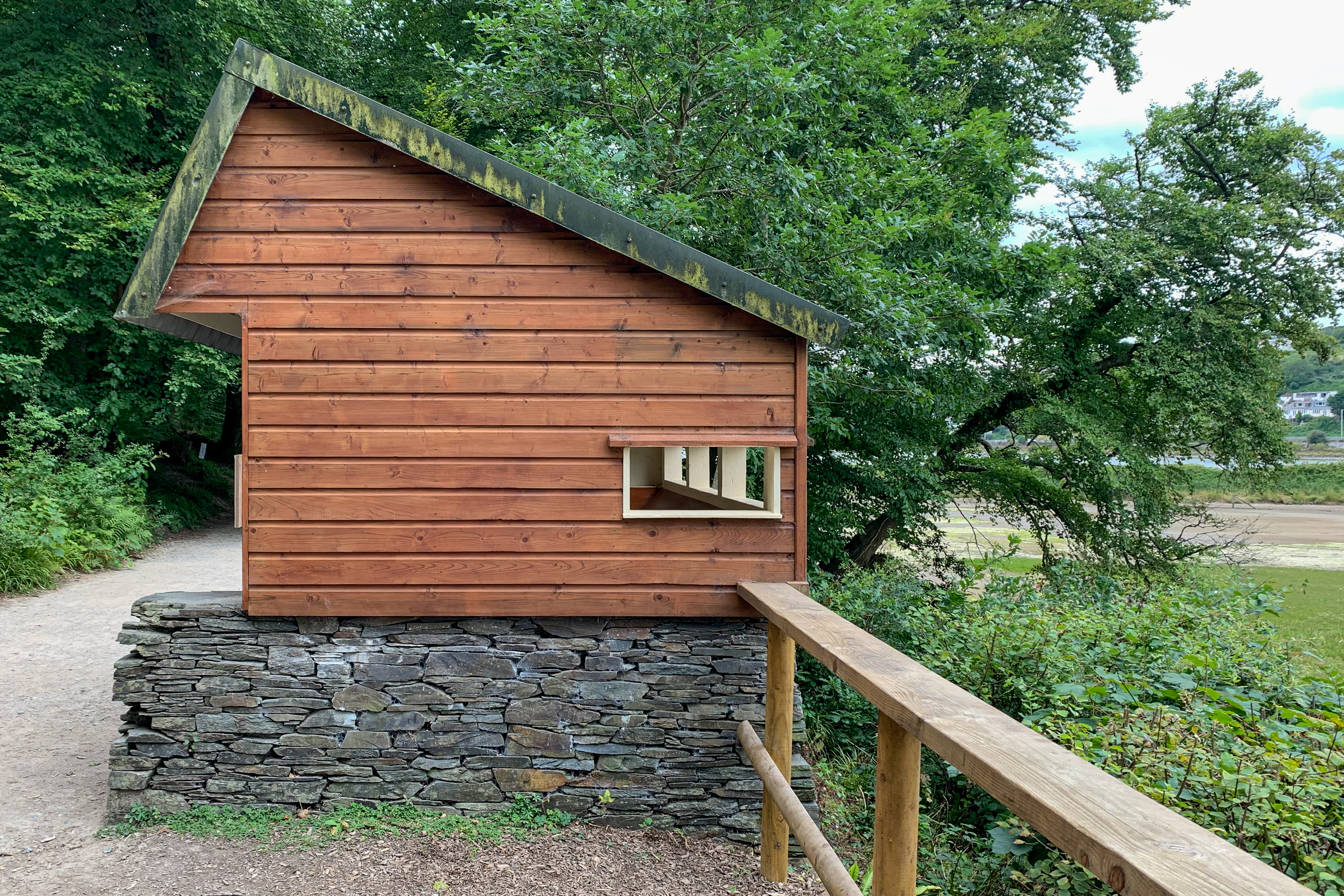
Bird hide in Saltram Park, Plymouth

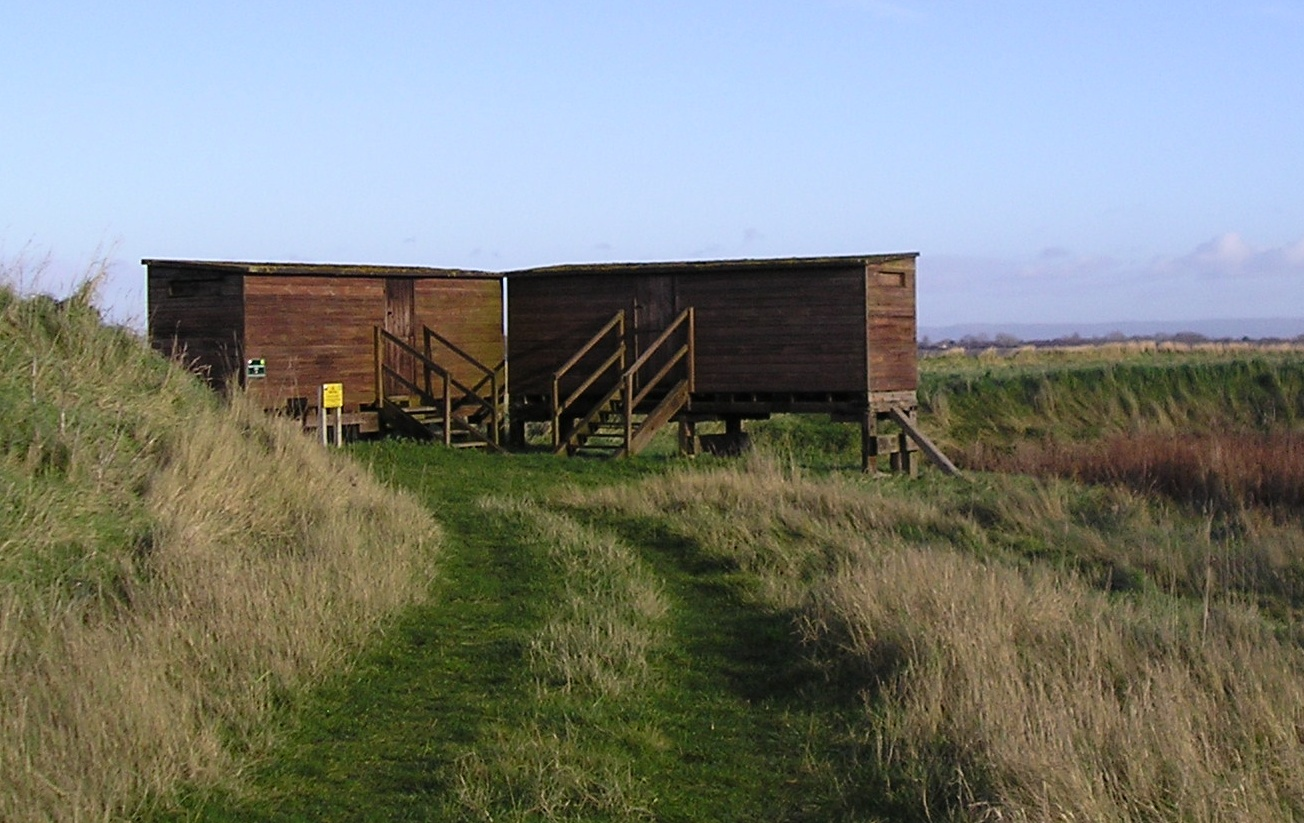
Bird Hide, Stert Point
