= Loch of the Lowes =

Freshwater loch in central Scotland

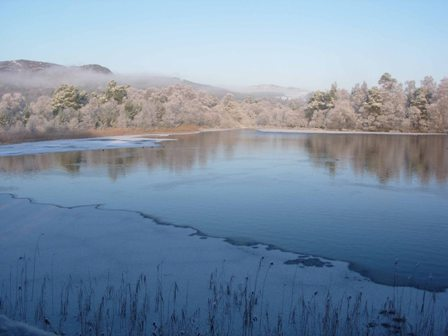
- December 2005

- Location within Perth and Kinross
- Location: NO049438
- Coordinates: 56.5773°N 3.5489°W
- Type: freshwater loch
- Primary inflows: Lunan Burn
- Primary outflows: Lunan Burn
- Catchment area: 14.9 km^{2} (3,680 acres)
- Basin countries: Scotland
- Surface area: 87.9 ha (217 acres)
- Average depth: 4.9 m (16 ft)
- Max. depth: 16 m (53 ft)
- Water volume: 5,492,700 m^{3} (193,973,000 ft^{3})
- Shore length^{1}: 4.4 km (2.7 mi)
- Surface elevation: 101 m (331 ft)
- Max. temperature: 15.6 °C (60.0 °F)
- Min. temperature: 10.0 °C (50.0 °F)
- Islands: 0
- ^{1} Shore length is not a well-defined measure.

Loch of the Lowes is a loch near Dunkeld in Perth and Kinross, Scotland. The loch and the surrounding area are designated as a wildlife reserve, run by the Scottish Wildlife Trust. The loch is also a designated Site of Special Scientific Interest (SSSI), as well as forming part of a Special Area of Conservation.

The loch hosts a variety of wildlife, including a pair of breeding ospreys, red squirrels, otters and beavers. Wildfowl numbers peak in early winter with migrant greylag geese roosting on the loch. In addition, goldeneyes, mallards, goosanders, wigeons, teals, tufted ducks and great crested grebes can also be seen.

== History ==
During the nineteenth century, a drainage channel was dug, connecting Loch of Craiglush with Lowes, causing the water levels of the two lochs to equalise. The Lunan Burn now flows through this channel. The reserve land was purchased by the Scottish Wildlife Trust in 1969, due to the loch being the largest mesotrophic loch in the area, and the presence of the rare pondweed slender naiad.

== Geography ==
Loch of the Lowes forms part of a chain of lochs known as the Lunan Lochs. The Lunan Lochs are Lochs Craiglush, Lowes, Butterstone, Clunie and Marlee, and are connected by the Lunan Burn, which drains into the River Isla, itself a tributary of the River Tay. Loch of the Lowes, along with Loch Craiglush and Loch Butterstone is situated just north of the Highland Boundary Fault, and are mesotrophic lochs, and are characterised by a relatively low nutrient level, as their catchment areas are mostly acidic uplands. By comparison, Lochs Clunie and Marlee are situated south of the Highland Boundary Fault, and have a higher nutrient level. The Lunan Lochs are an example of a rare habitat in the United Kingdom, which start from nutrient-poor oligotrophic lochs further upstream; to richer, mesotrophic lochs downstream.

== Wildlife ==
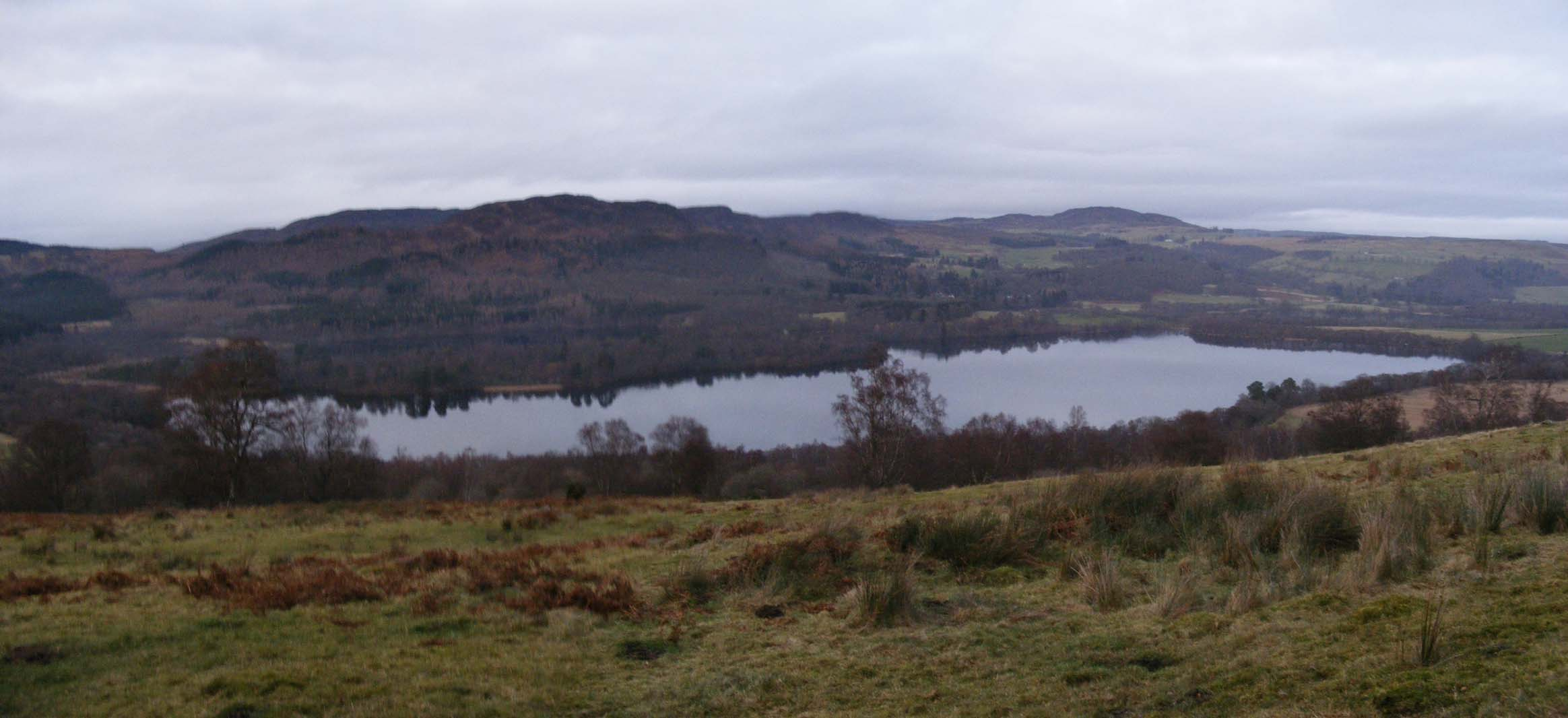
Loch of the Lowes from the south

=== Birds ===
The loch and surrounding woodland host a large variety of birds. In winter, pink-footed geese, greylag geese, wigeons and whooper swans can be seen on the loch, and in summer, large numbers of swallows, sand martins and swifts can be seen over the water. Tufted ducks, goldeneye and great crested grebe can be seen year-round, and both goldeneye and great crested grebe can be seen performing their courtship dance in early spring.

In the woodlands, there are jays, treecreepers, great spotted woodpeckers, siskins and sparrowhawks. In the winter, redpoll and bramblings frequent the woods, and in summer, redstarts and cuckoos can be found.

Between late March to late August, there are a pair of breeding ospreys. Their nest is situated within 200 metres of an observation hide, allowing up-close viewing through binoculars, telescopes and closed-circuit television (CCTV). They can also be observed via an HD camera from the Visitor Centre or online

=== Mammals ===
Fallow and roe deer are often seen from the hide and sometimes otters can be observed. Red squirrels are also quite numerous on the reserve. In 2012 a beaver was spotted on the loch. Beavers were reintroduced to Scotland in 2008, after overhunting led to their disappearance several centuries before and have successfully repopulated much of the area around the Tay and its tributaries.

=== Fish ===
Pike, perch and brown trout are all present in the loch. Fishing in or on the loch is not permitted at any time of year.

== Access ==
The loch is situated about 2 miles (3 km) north-east of Dunkeld. A small unclassified road off the A923 leads to a small car park on the reserve. All paths and infrastructure are located within a western corner of the loch, however, a short woodland footpath connects the visitor centre to Dunkeld by joining a right of way across this minor road, and is suitable for walkers and mountain bikers, but is not suitable for wheelchair users. There is a cycle rack in the reserve car park, and parking for approximately 24 cars.

== Visitor centre ==
The Scottish Wildlife Trust operates a visitor centre on the western side of the loch. There are three observation hides offering views over the loch, and are situated close to the osprey nest. The visitor centre is one of four visitor centres operated by the Scottish Wildlife Trust, the other three being at Montrose Basin, Falls of Clyde and Jupiter Wildlife Centre. The visitor centre and car park are open on a reduced schedule for a third of the year during winter and an entry fee is required for non-SWT members.

Opening hours:

• 1 March - 31 October: open daily from 10:00-17:00

• 1 November - 28 February: open Friday-Sunday from 10:30-16:00
