= Dyfi Osprey Project =

Coordinates: 52.5687°N 3.918°W

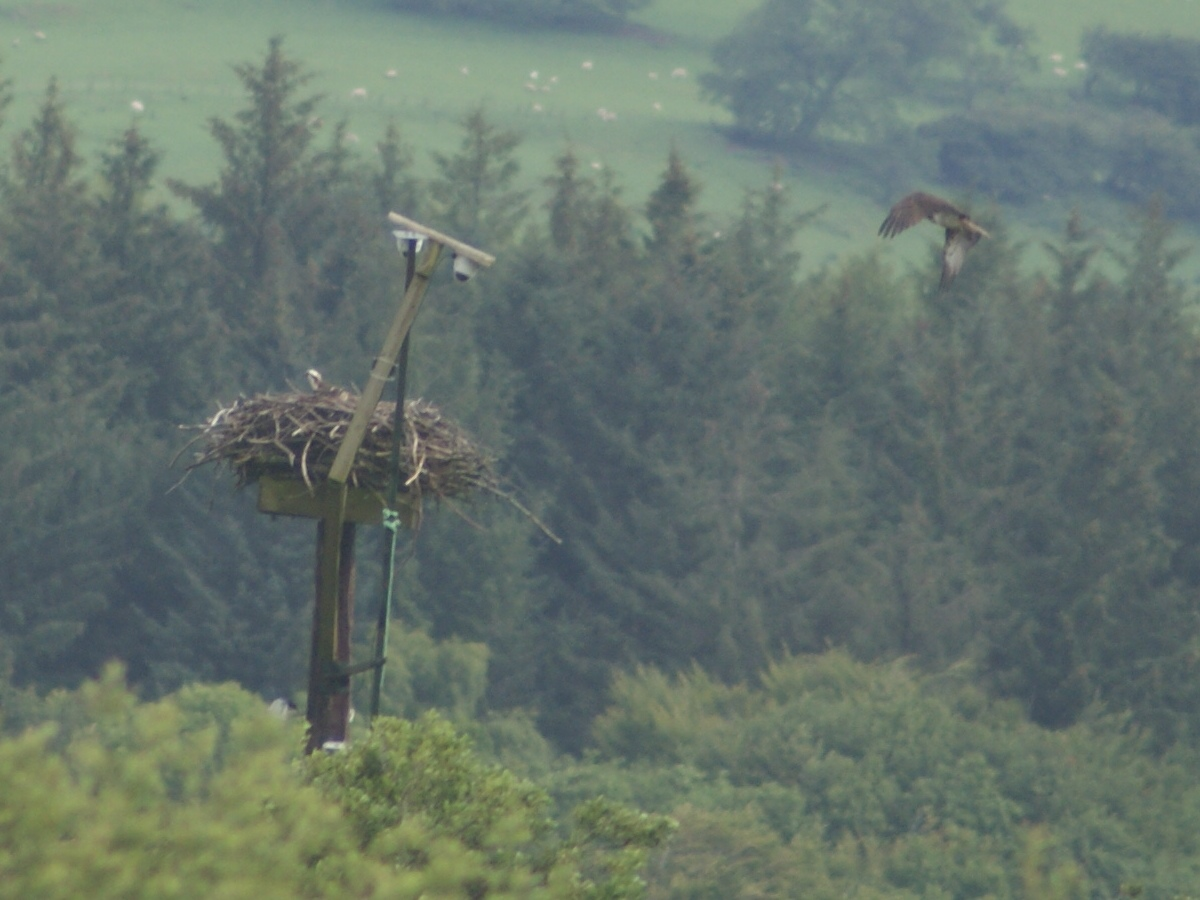
Osprey returning to the nest site

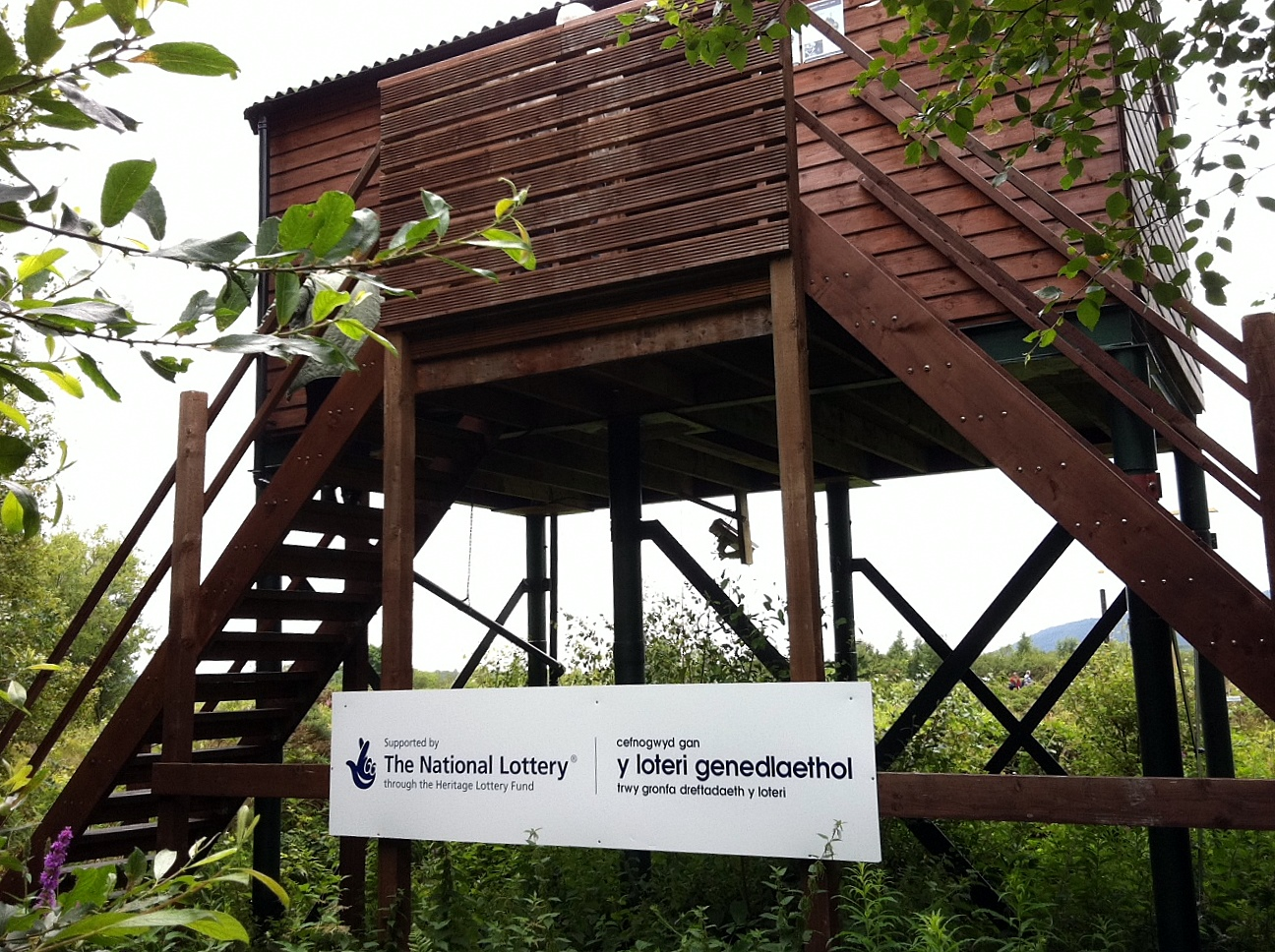
Main hide, July 2011

The Dyfi Osprey Project is a conservation project at the Cors Dyfi nature reserve near Derwenlas, in the county of Powys, Wales, under the management of the Montgomeryshire Wildlife Trust.

== History and activity ==
=== 2011 ===
In 2011, for the first time in over 400 years, Ospreys are breeding in the Dyfi valley on the Cors Dyfi Nature Reserve site, following three years work to reintroduce them into the area.

A resident male osprey managed to attract a female osprey (a 2008 bird from a Rutland Water nest) who laid their first egg on 25 April 2011, a second three days later, and a final egg on 1 May 2011.

On 5 June 2011 the first osprey chick emerged, the second on Monday 6 June 2011, and the third on 7 June 2011, comprising one female (ringed Blue DJ) and two males (ringed Blue DH and Blue 99). The young ospreys are named after local rivers that flow into the River Dyfi; The female, Leri; and the two males Einion and Dulas.

==== Satellite tracking ====
The Montgomeryshire Wildlife Trust, in partnership with the BBC (since featuring the Dyfi Osprey Project on Springwatch in 2011) successfully fitted all three of the osprey chicks with GPS satellite trackers as they were ringed on 19 July 2011 to feed back positional information on their 3,500 miles (5,600 km) migration to Africa. They are the first Welsh ospreys to be satellite tracked.

=== 2012 ===
In 2012, the same two adult ospreys (Monty and Nora) returned from migration to the nest site at Cors Dyfi. Nora arrived on 24 March, and Monty returned on 2 April.

The first egg was laid on Wednesday 18 April, and subsequent eggs laid at three-day intervals on 21 and 24 April respectively. Forty days after being laid, the first egg hatched on Monday 28 May. However the chick survived for only three days. Meanwhile, the other two eggs had also hatched.

However, a persistent period of torrential rain and cold weather then hit west Wales, flooding the marsh area where the nest is located. On Saturday 9 June the smallest chick also perished, and the last remaining chick was also becoming weaker. Normally it would not be the policy of a wildlife project to intervene with nature, however in the interests of re-establishing osprey populations in Wales, the project decided to act. There followed the most amazing rescue operation by the staff of the Dyfi Osprey Project. Two members of DOP waded through deep water out to the nest with ladders, and removed the chick from the nest, dried its feathers, warmed it up and fed it some tiny pieces of fish, before carefully returning it to the nest around thirty minutes later. The little chick rallied! Three days later it was named Ceulan, after the local river Ceulan which had burst its banks during the rains.

On Friday 13 July, the chick - now a juvenile - was again removed from the nest, this time for ringing with a blue Darvic ring with the letters 3C, and was weighed and measured with the verdict that Ceulan was a young male. A satellite tracker was also fitted so that he could be followed as he made his first migratory journey. Just over a week later, he fledged from the nest at 53 days old, and after some flying practice over the next few weeks, he departed on 3 September. His mother, Nora had already left on migration, leaving Monty to continue to feed the youngster. Monty departed just two days after Ceulan.

Ceulan was then followed on his journey south through Europe and across into Africa, where he ended up in Senegal. On 1 December, Ceulan dived into Diawel River, a tributary of the Senegal River and got caught up in some fishing nets and was unable to get free. He was found the following morning by a local fisherman, who realised with the tracker that this was an important bird and kept him for two weeks. When local birdwatchers came in search of Ceulan, they were taken to the fisherman and retrieved his body on 15 December 2012.

=== 2013 ===
In 2013, the first osprey to visit the nest on 5 April was a new female bird, named Elin. The resident male, Monty, returned on Sunday 7 April, by which time Elin had disappeared again, to reappear briefly on 19 April. Nora, the breeding female from 2011 and 2012 was not to return that year.

On 23 April, a second female appeared, she was unringed, and given the name Seren (Welsh for star). She mated with Monty and stayed three days, but then also continued on her journey. The next day a third female, ringed BlueFS, arrived on the nest. This was a three-year-old female who had hatched in Dores near Loch Ness, Scotland. She ate a lot of fish but refused to mate with Monty.

On Monday 29 April at 10.30am a fourth bird White UR (a 3 year old bird who hatched at Ythan Valley, Aberdeenshire) was seen on a nearby perch. Shortly after Seren reappeared, divebombing BlueFS on the nest, ousting her and taking possession - BlueFS was not seen again. On Tuesday 30 April a fifth female bird appeared - Blue12, a three-year-old who had hatched at Rutland and had briefly visited Cors Dyfi in 2012, landing on the nest briefly and surprising the young Ceulan. Monty set off in chase after Blue12, and an aerial battle lasting 7 hours ensued. The chase continued on 1 and 2 May. Meanwhile, a bored Seren disappeared again on 2 May and was not seen again.

On 3 May a victorious Blue12 landed on the nest. Monty arrived and dropped a fish on her back. Four days later, Blue12 was named Glesni, which is Welsh for blue/blueness after her Darvic ring colour.

The first eggs were laid on 22 and 25 May, and were to hatch successfully on 28 and 30 June, despite fears that one would not after it was pecked by a crow and appeared to have a tiny chip.

On 6 August the two chicks, both females, were ringed and named - Clarach (Blue/white 2R) and Cerist (Blue/white 1R), and they fledged on 18 and 20 August respectively. Cerist disappeared for two days after fledging, with fears for her safety, but she returned safely on 22 August.

On 31 August, Glesni left on migration. Monty continued to feed his two offspring. Clarach migrated on 18 September and Cerist on 20 September, both aged 82 days. Monty departed less than an hour after Cerist.

=== 2014 ===
In 2014, the first bird to visit Dyfi was on 24 March, when a four-year-old female from Rutland Water ringed Blue24 arrived. She had also been seen briefly in both Dyfi and Rutland in 2013, but had then spent summer 2013 on a nest in Gwynedd.

On 2 April, a local unringed male bird known as Dai Dot (because of his two white eyebrow feathers) arrived on the nest, but Blue24 had been seen the day before back in her natal site in Rutland. The next day she returned and they mated, building the nest together.

The resident male osprey arrived on 8 April, chasing Dai Dot down the Dyfi Estuary. Blue24 remained on the nest, and Monty brought her fish and mated with her. On 10 April, the 2013 female, Glesni (Blue12) returned, and a major skirmish between the two females began, lasting several days, with Glesni eventually reclaiming her nest, despite major divebombing by Blue24. Blue 24 was to return several times over the next weeks, including landing on a nearby unused nest platform.

The first egg was laid on 2 May, and the second on 6 May. Despite further intrusions on the nest by Blue 24 during incubation, both eggs successfully hatched on 8 and 11 June. The chicks were ringed aged 37 days and 34 days, and judged to be a young male, name Gwynant (Welsh for White stream, due to the very white egg from which he hatched and his lighter plumage) and Deri (a tributary of the Dyfi) - blue and white Darvic rings as well as BTO rings were placed on the birds - Gwynant carries Darvic ring Blue/white 3R and Deri 5R. Neither chick was satellite tagged. Gwynant fledged the nest aged 49 days on 27 July, and Deri at 51 days on 1 August.

The female, Glesni, was again first to leave on migration on 19 August. The two chicks followed, with Gwynant departing on 30 August and Deri on 4 Sept. The male, Monty started his migration on 7 September.

==== The new Cors Dyfi 360° Observatory ====
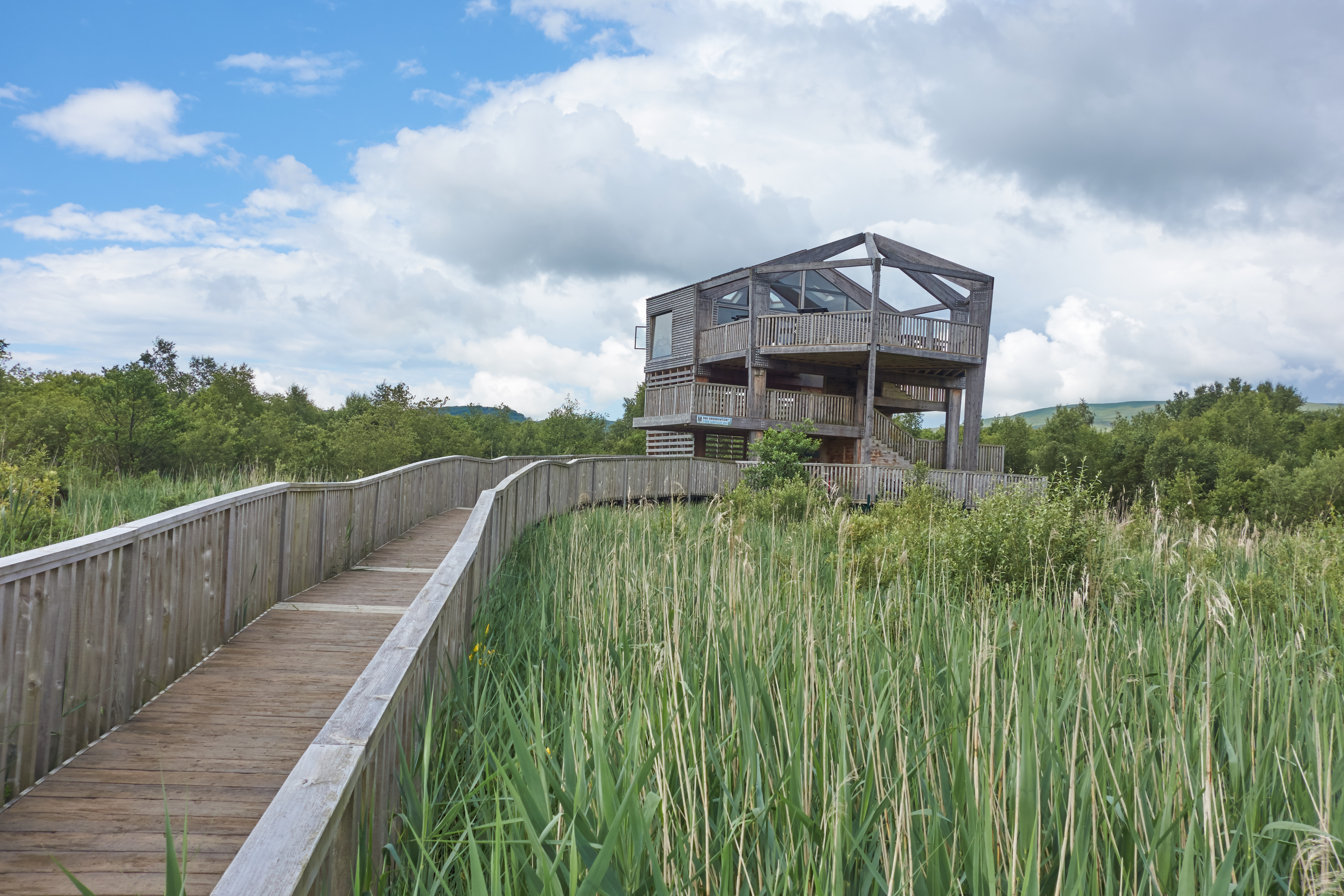
Cors Dyfi 360° Observatory

On 18 April 2014, Montgomeryshire Wildlife Trust opened a brand new, three floor £1.4m observatory on the Cors Dyfi Reserve. From the upper viewing level, 10 m (33 ft) above the bog below, the building provides a full 360 degree panoramic view of the Cors Dyfi Reserve and Dyfi Valley with the Plynlimon Mountains and Snowdonia National Park beyond, enhancing the visitor experience to the full range of flora and fauna on the reserve. The two main sources of funding for the Observatory were The Heritage Lottery Fund and European Regional Development Fund Communities and Nature project. In-kind volunteering support and a grant from the Countryside Council for Wales also contributed to its successful construction.

In February 2015, it was announced that the Cors Dyfi 360 Observatory had been shortlisted in the RICS Wales Awards, which recognise inspirational developments in land management, property, & construction.

The Cors Dyfi 360 Observatory was the winner of the 2015 National Lottery Environment Award, voted for by the public. The award was presented to the project by Springwatch presenter Michaela Strachan at the project on 13 August 2015.

=== 2015 ===
The first osprey to land on the Dyfi nest in 2015 was an unringed male, known locally as Dai Dot, who spent the day of 6 April on site, before departing again. On the morning of 7 April, the female osprey Blue 24(10) arrived on the nest in the early morning, and "Dai Dot" also reappeared at 1.30pm. At 2.19, the resident breeding male, Monty arrived, leading to Dai Dot's departure. Monty mated with Blue 24, and they started to nest build. The following day, 8 April. the resident female osprey, Blue 12(10), known as Glesni, returned to Cors Dyfi just before 9am and chased Blue24 away, and Monty brought in fish for her.

The first egg was laid on 22 April, followed by two more, the first time Glesni had laid a clutch of 3. All three eggs hatched successfully on 29 & 31 May and 2 June. The chicks were ringed on Friday 3 July. The oldest, a female was given a blue Darvic W1 and named Merin. The second was ringed W2 and named Celyn, also a female. The third, a male, was ringed W3 and named Brenig. In a surprise day of excitement all three chicks fledged the nest on the same day, 22 July.

Glesni was last seen at Cors Dyfi on 24 August, as was the eldest chick, Merin. Brenig migrated three days later, and Celyn on 29 August. Monty stayed at Cors Dyfi until 4 September before migrating. The female Blue 24 was seen all throughout the 2015 season on the reserve, and the breeding pair became increasingly tolerant of her presence as the chicks grew. She was last seen at Cors Dyfi on 2 September 2015 before starting her migration.

=== 2016 ===
Once again the female osprey from Rutland Blue 24(10) arrived at the Dyfi nest before the breeding pair, on 25 March 2016, before disappearing for a few days, returning on 29 March. On Wednesday 30 March, a second female Blue 5F(12), also a Rutland bred bird, appeared on the Dyfi, challenging 24 for the nest on that day and the next, when a red kite also joined the fracas. The local unringed male known as "Dai Dot" also appeared on 30 March, mating with 24, before disappearing again. On Sunday 3 April, the resident breeding male known as Monty arrived on the Dyfi nest at 1.07pm, and the female Blue 12(10), Glesni, just over two hours later at 3.35pm. After a short battle with 24, Glesni regained her nest.

Blue 24 did not retreat entirely, but only to an empty nest platform on the Cors Dyfi nature reserve, and Monty was observed mating with both females on a regular basis - an interesting case of polygyny.

On Sunday 17 April, Blue 24 was observed incubating on the spare nest platform, indicating an egg had been laid. The following day, Glesni laid the first of three eggs. Monty supported both nests with fish delivery and relief incubation for three days, but then abandoned Blue 24 and her eggs, focussing his efforts and fish deliveries entirely on Glesni and the main nest. Eventually, Blue24 was forced to leave the nest to fish for herself, and started spending longer periods away from the eggs in the nest - a camera drone sent up during one of her absences showed three eggs in the nest. They were later predated by crows.

The first egg hatched on 24 May, the second egg did not hatch, and the third, a very white egg, hatched on 29 May. The two chicks were ringed on 30 June - the eldest a female ringed Z0 and named Ceri, and the younger bird a male ringed Z1 and named Tegid (after Llyn Tegid). For the first time, buccal swabs were also taken, allowing DNA analysis to be conducted on the chicks. The unhatched egg was removed and sent to the University of Sheffield for analysis.

Z0/Ceri fledged at the age of 51 days on 14 July, and Z1/Tegid at the age of 50 days on 18 July.

At 11.52pm on the night of 17 July, Ceri was roosting off the nest on a larch tree perch for the first time overnight, when she suddenly fell from the perch. She remained in deep reeds for almost 12 hours until finally flying back up to the perch, only to be knocked off again three hours later at 2.20pm by her younger brother, who had only just fledged and mistimed his landing. She then managed to fly to the nest, but appeared to have damaged her left leg/talon and appeared in shock and pain. She remained in a dejected posture, hardly moving on the nest and refusing to eat for three days. At 11.54pm on Wednesday 20 July, lay down and died. Her body was removed from the nest on 22 July and taken for post-mortem, which revealed no signs of infection, poisoning or disease, and no broken bones, but signs of trauma and inflammation on the left flank. A new hide on the reserve, being constructed in autumn 2016 will be named the Ceri Hide in memory.

The female osprey Glesni (Blue12) was last seen on 12 August, probably starting migration early the next morning. The juvenile male chick Tegid (Z1) was last clearly seen on 25 August, probably starting his migration the next day, aged 88 days. The adult male Monty remained at Cors Dyfi until 1 September before commencing migration. Finally Blue24 was last seen on 4 September. In 2018 Dai Dot and Blue 24 started breeding together on a nest at Llyn Brenig. In 2020 Blue 5F raised her first successful brood at Llyn Clywedog.

=== 2017 ===
The single female osprey from Rutland Water, Blue 24(2010) was once again first to arrive back from her wintering grounds, landing on the nest at Cors Dyfi on 24 March 2017.

However, the nesting platform she had laid eggs on in 2016 was removed under licence from Natural Resources Wales on 28 March 2017, so as to prevent the polygamous situation that had occurred in 2016.

The resident adult breeding ospreys arrived back on the nest at Cors Dyfi on the same day, 1 April 2017. Three eggs were laid, and all successfully hatched on 21, 22 and 26 May. The chicks were ringed on 27 June 2017, and revealed to be one male (Darvic ring Z2) and two females (rings Z3 and Z4). In keeping with previous years, the chicks were named after Welsh rivers and streams, with Z1 the oldest a male named Aeron after Afon Aeron, the middle female chick Z3 named Menai, after the Menai Strait, and the youngest female chick Z4 named Eitha, a tributary of Afon Dyfrdwy or River Dee, Wales. The three chicks successfully fledged the nest on 11, 13 and 19 July.

The oldest chick was the first to start his migration. Aged just 84 days, Aeron/Z2 was last seen in the area on 13 August. The adult female was next to depart the following day, 14 August. The two female chicks Menai/Z3 and Eitha/Z4 stayed several more days, finally departing on 24 & 26 August, at the age of 93 days and 92 days respectively. Monty remained just over a week longer, finally departing on 2 September, his timing in keeping with previous seasons.

2017 was also the year that the breeding adults Monty and Glesni became grandparents, as Blue 2R known as Clarach, their first chick to hatch in 2013 successfully bred and raised two chicks on a nest on Forestry Commission near Aberfoyle in Scotland (see Returning Chicks section).

== Returning chicks ==
3 May 2016 - Blue 2R (13), named Clarach, was the first sighting of a Dyfi bred chick returning to Wales. She landed on the osprey nest at Glaslyn Osprey Project, near Porthmadog, and was seen there again for several hours on 13–14 May. On 17 May, Clarach was sighted at the Manton Bay nest at Rutland Osprey Project. On 19 May, she appeared on a nest at Kielder Water in Northumberland.

The following year she arrived at the Aberfoyle nest in early April, seeing off another female. She settled on this nest with an unringed male and went on to lay three eggs, all of which hatched. Their third chick was weak and it died despite efforts from both parents to feed it. The older two chicks grew normally and were eventually ringed LH0 and LH1 - they were both deemed to be male. They were also fitted with satellite trackers.

28 April 2018 - Blue 3R (14), named Gwynant, returned to Wales, landing on the Pont Croesor nest near the Glaslyn Osprey Project.

19 May 2018 - Z1 (16), named Tegid was seen at the Glaslyn Osprey Project. On 21 May 2018 he visited the nest where he hatched at Dyfi Osprey Project.

== Ospreys in Wales: The First 10 Years ==
In 2014, Ospreys in Wales: The First 10 Years was published by Dyfi's project manager. The book offers a detailed photographic record and personal history of osprey re-establishment in the country. It focuses particularly on the Glaslyn Osprey Project near Porthmadog, where birds have been nesting successfully since 2004, and the Dyfi Osprey Project, where ospreys have been breeding since 2011.

== Dyfi Ospreys on BBC Springwatch & Autumnwatch ==
In 2011, the Montgomeryshire Wildlife Trust teamed up with BBC Springwatch and Autumnwatch to feature the Dyfi ospreys. The first show was broadcast on 7 October 2011 and a series of clips followed the birds on migration, presented by leading conservationist Roy Dennis, who travelled to West Africa where they finally tracked down the satellite tagged chick Einion (BlueDH).

In 2012, BBC Springwatch was being broadcast from nearby Ynys-hir RSPB reserve during torrential rain, flooding the valley, the BBC's own camp and the nest area, resulting in a rescue of one chick, Ceulan.

In 2013, BBC Springwatch returned again to Cors Dyfi, and filmed the battles between the female birds to win the nest, after the previous two years' female, Nora did not return. In 2014, the programme moved to a new location at RSPB Minsmere, but still followed activity at DOP, broadcasting footage of the battle between Glesni Blue 12 and her cousin Blue 24, which had been taken from the HD cameras at the Dyfi Osprey Project itself.

In 2016, BBC Springwatch sent a cameraman to Cors Dyfi to record the polygynous antics of Monty with the two females.

== See also ==
- The Montgomeryshire Wildlife Trust
- Cors Dyfi nature reserve
- Ynys-hir RSPB reserve
- Glaslyn Osprey Project
- Ospreys in Britain
