= Rutland Township, Illinois =

Rutland Township, Illinois may refer to one of the following townships:

- Rutland Township, Kane County, Illinois
- Rutland Township, LaSalle County, Illinois

== See also ==
- Rutland Township (disambiguation)
