= Montgomeryshire Wildlife Trust =

Wildlife trust in mid Wales

Montgomeryshire Wildlife Trust (Welsh: Ymddiriedolaeth Natur Maldwyn) is one of six wildlife trusts in Wales. It covers the vice-county of Montgomeryshire. and is based in Welshpool.

As at 2013 the trust had 20 reserves. They include:

- Cors Dyfi, the home of the Dyfi Osprey Project
- Glaslyn in the Cambrian Mountains
- Llanymynech Rocks near Llanymynech
- Roundton Hill near Churchstoke
