= Roundton Hill =

Hill in Wales

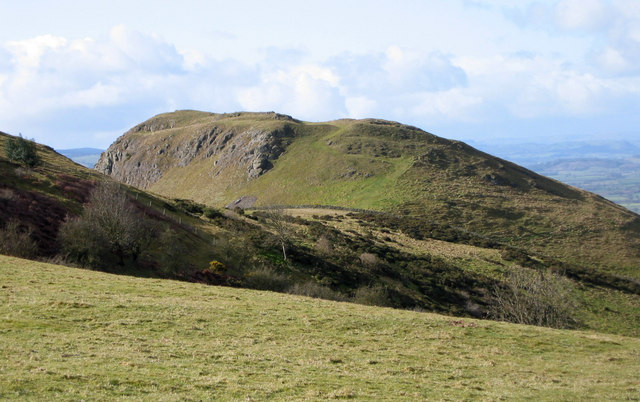
- Roundton Hill viewed from the northeast
- Interactive map of Roundton Hill
- Location: Church Stoke, Powys
- Coordinates: 52°32′53″N 3°02′34″W
- Operator: Montgomeryshire Wildlife Trust
- Status: SSSI
- Website: www.montwt.co.uk/hill.html

Roundton Hill is a rounded, steep sided, 1,210 feet (370 m) hill, volcanic in origin, in the easternmost part of old Montgomeryshire (in present day-Powys), Wales, which juts into the English border near Church Stoke. It is managed as a nature reserve by the Montgomeryshire Wildlife Trust, who acquired it in 1985.

== Archaeology ==
There was once an Iron Age hillfort here. The vantage point offers views across the surrounding countryside, with views of Corndon Hill to the north, as well as the Cambrian Mountains to the west. Lead and Barytes mines run into the hill, and are today used as a roost by Horseshoe and Daubenton's bats. Having avoided the plough, the hill's steep rocky slopes still support plants such as the mountain pansy, which has long since disappeared from most of the hills in mid-Wales. The reserve was made a Site of Special Scientific Interest (SSSI) in 1986.

== See also ==
- List of hillforts in Wales
