= Patti Rutland Jazz =

- Origin: (United States) Brundidge AL Headland AL
- Genres: Jazz and Modern Dance
- Years active: 2006 – present
- Member of: Dance Educators of America

Patti Rutland Jazz started as a multi-genre, professional dance company located in Dothan, Alabama. It was founded in 1989 by choreographer Patti Rutland. The company produced 3 main stage shows per year as well as a show in their black box theatre. Guest artists for Patti Rutland Jazz include Ben Verreen. The company has won awards at the Jazz Dance World Congress (founded by Rutland's teacher, Gus Giordano), including the esteemed Gold Shoe Award. In 2018, Patti Rutland retired as artistic director and named Christina Green Hicks as her successor.

== Performance ==
Patti Rutland Jazz produced full length contemporary, jazz, and hip-hop theatrical dance productions each year in their home city of Dothan. These performances have taken place at many venues including Dothan's Cultural Arts Center, the Dothan Civic Center, Dothan's historic landmark theatre, The Dothan Opera House, and Wiregrass Church. Patti Rutland Jazz has also toured at appeared at various dance festivals such as Jazz on Tap in Atlanta and Panoply Festival of the Arts in Huntsville. In June 2008 the PRJ company made its New York debut at the Ailey Citigroup Theater.

In addition to concert work, Patti Rutland Jazz also produces an annual Christmas show titled "Santa's Workshop", an original work by Patti Rutland Simpson. Santa's Workshop is registered with the Dramatists Guild of America, represented by The Cooper Company and available nationwide for theatre companies and dance studios.

== Outreach ==
Founded in 1989, the company was first a studio-centric, amateur dance company but changed its mission and in 2005 it became a 501(c)(3) non-profit corporation driven by a professional company. PRJ adopted a core mission to provide dance instruction and scholarship opportunities to under-served children in Dothan and the surrounding Wiregrass Region communities through its outreach program. The company provides free dance instruction to thousands of school children.
