= Rae Loch =

Freshwater lake in Perth and Kinross, Scotland

- Ardblair Loch
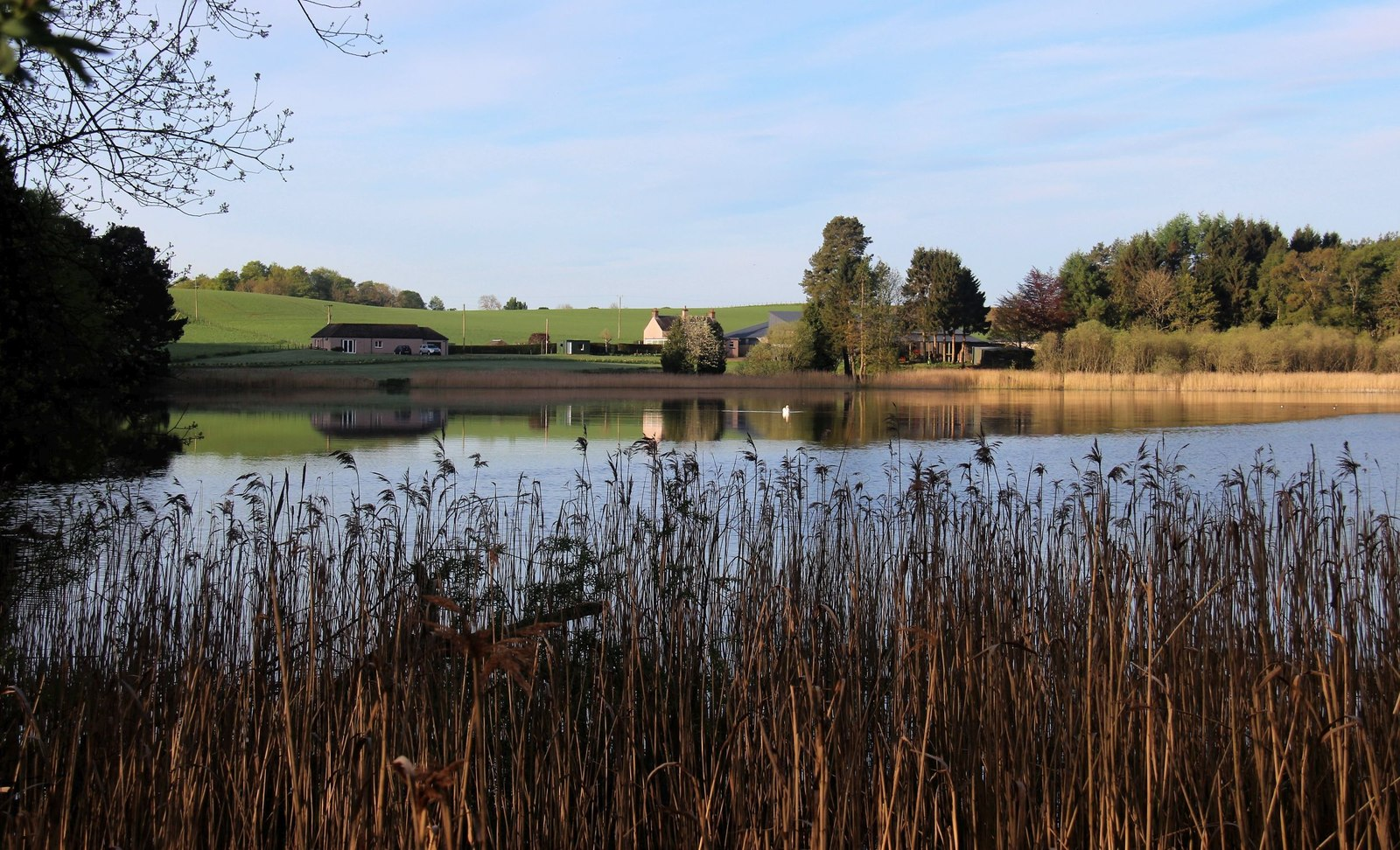
- Peaceful morning on Rae Loch

- Location within Perth and Kinross
- Location: NO158445
- Coordinates: 56°35′07″N 3°22′15″W
- Type: freshwater loch
- Primary outflows: Unnamed burn into Loch of Drumellie
- Max. length: 0.804672 km (0.500000 mi)
- Max. width: 0.3218 km (0.2000 mi)
- Surface area: 3.9 ha (9.6 acres)
- Average depth: 6.5 ft (2.0 m)
- Max. depth: 16 ft (4.9 m)
- Water volume: 87,227,000 ft^{3} (2,470,000 m^{3})
- Shore length^{1}: 3.9 km (2.4 mi)
- Surface elevation: 65 m (213 ft)
- Max. temperature: 60.8 °F (16.0 °C)
- Min. temperature: 57.1 °F (13.9 °C)
- Islands: 0
- ^{1} Shore length is not a well-defined measure.

Rae Loch is a small lowland freshwater loch that sits directly to the east of Loch of Drumellie into which it flows and is 1.5 miles (2.4 km) to the west of Blairgowrie, in Perth and Kinross. The loch is also a designated Site of Special Scientific Interest (SSSI), as well as forming part of a Special Area of Conservation.
