= Fingask Loch =

Small lowland freshwater loch

- Location within Perth and Kinross
- Location: NO164429
- Coordinates: 56.571100°N 3.361600°W
- Type: freshwater loch
- Primary inflows: outflow of White Loch
- Primary outflows: small burn into Lunan Burn
- Max. length: 0.482 km (0.300 mi)
- Max. width: 0.4023 km (0.2500 mi)
- Surface area: 12.8 ha (32 acres)
- Average depth: 23 ft (7.0 m)
- Max. depth: 25 ft (7.6 m)
- Water volume: 32,182,000 ft^{3} (911,300 m^{3})
- Shore length^{1}: 1.5 km (0.93 mi)
- Surface elevation: 46 m (151 ft)
- Max. temperature: 58.8 °F (14.9 °C)
- Min. temperature: 48.7 °F (9.3 °C)
- Islands: 0
- ^{1} Shore length is not a well-defined measure.

Fingask Loch is a small lowland freshwater loch that is about three-quarters of a mile from Rae Loch in the valley of the Lunan Burn and is 1.5 miles south-east of Blairgowrie, in Perth and Kinross. Directly to the east is the smaller White Loch, and next to it is the Black Loch.

The loch is also a designated Site of Special Scientific Interest (SSSI), as well as forming part of a Special Area of Conservation.
