= Glaslyn Osprey Project =

Coordinates: 52.95058°N 4.09684°W

The Glaslyn Osprey Project is located in the Glaslyn Valley at Pont Croesor near Porthmadog in Gwynedd, north-west Wales. The project has supported ospreys since 2004 when they came to the Snowdonia National Park to breed after being absent from Wales for decades. The ospreys spend every winter in West Africa and travel thousands of miles to return to Glaslyn every year to breed and raise their chicks.

The project was initially run by RSPB Cymru. The RSPB Date with Nature site at Pont Croesor aimed to introduce people to the wildlife in the area, inform the public on conservation projects done by the RSPB and ensure 24-hour protection of the eggs in the nest. In 2012 the charity announced that it was looking to withdraw in order to prioritise other challenges facing Welsh wildlife. In September 2013, the project was handed over to a community interest company called Bywyd Gwyllt Glaslyn Wildlife. The project continues successfully.

== History and background ==
Since their disappearance in 1916 from Great Britain, osprey (Pandion haliaetus) have returned to Scotland (in the 1950s), England and Wales. The first pair breeding in Wales were found in 2004 near Porthmadog.

In 2004, due to bad weather and rot in the upper branches of the tree, the nest collapsed. Before the next season in 2005, a platform was constructed with help from local school children. In 2005 the pair returned, took up residence on the specially made platform, and raised the first known Welsh brood. The nest is being monitored via a webcam.

Each year since 2004 the osprey chicks that hatched have been ringed and recorded. This has enabled them to be identified on their return to the UK where many have been seen in subsequent years and bred successfully themselves. The original osprey Welsh pair returned every year and bred successfully until 2015 when the male bird did not reappear from Africa in the spring. However, a new male arrived and bonded successfully with the resident female and bred successfully that year. They continued to breed until 2021 when the male was injured and the chicks which had hatched did not survive, but the pair both returned in 2022 and successfully raised another brood. In 2023 the female osprey who had been at the site since 2004 did not return from migration, but the resident male attracted a new mate'

== Pont Croesor Station ==
In 2010 the Pont Croesor railway station of the Welsh Highland Railway was built near the site.

== See also ==
- Dyfi Osprey Project
- Ospreys in Britain
