= Loch of Clunie =

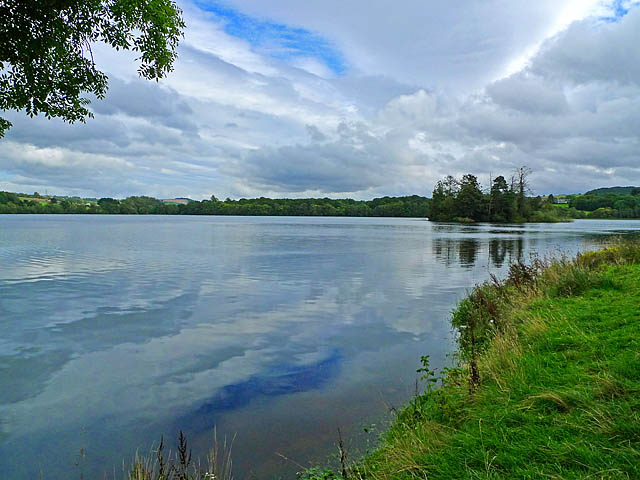
- Loch of Clunie. The island on the right (which is thought to be man made) contains the ruins of Clunie Castle.

- Location within Perth and Kinross
- Location: NO063781
- Coordinates: 56.5810°N 3.4436°W
- Type: freshwater loch
- Primary inflows: Lunan Burn from Loch of Butterstone
- Primary outflows: Lunan Burn into Loch of Drumellie
- Max. length: 410 m (1,350 ft)
- Max. width: 205 m (673 ft)
- Surface area: 50.6 ha (125 acres)
- Average depth: 8.8 m (29 ft)
- Max. depth: 21 m (69 ft)
- Water volume: 4,821,400 m^{3} (170,265,000 ft^{3})
- Shore length^{1}: 3.2 km (2.0 mi)
- Surface elevation: 47 m (154 ft)
- Max. temperature: 16.8 °C (62.3 °F)
- Min. temperature: 8.4 °C (47.2 °F)
- Islands: 1
- ^{1} Shore length is not a well-defined measure.

Loch of Clunie is a small freshwater loch two miles (three kilometres) west of Blairgowrie, Perth and Kinross, Scotland.

== Clunie Castle ==
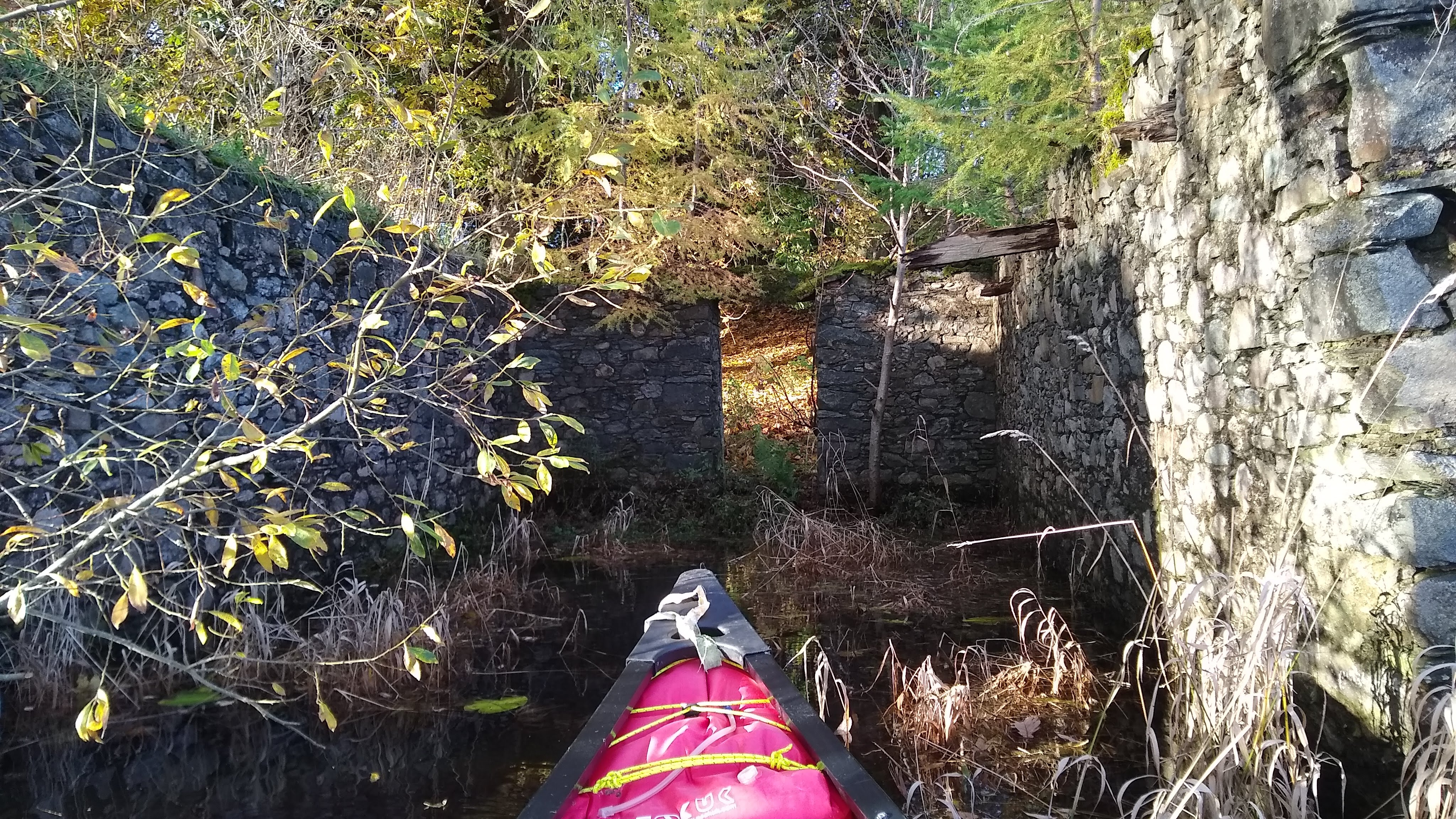
Loch of Clunie boathouse

The Loch of Clunie has a single island, said to be artificial, with the remains of Clunie Castle. The house was designed as a simple L-plan tower house and built by George Brown, Bishop of Dunkeld, between 1485 and 1514 as a spiritual retreat. A chapel was dedicated to St Catherine in the house in 1507. The island is surrounded by a dry-stone wall and there is a well designed pier at the south-end, constructed in 1512–1513. The house was burnt down and restored at the end of the 18th Century. It is now a ruin as the roof collapsed in 1989.
