= Cors Dyfi nature reserve =

Nature reserve in Powys, Wales

Cors Dyfi
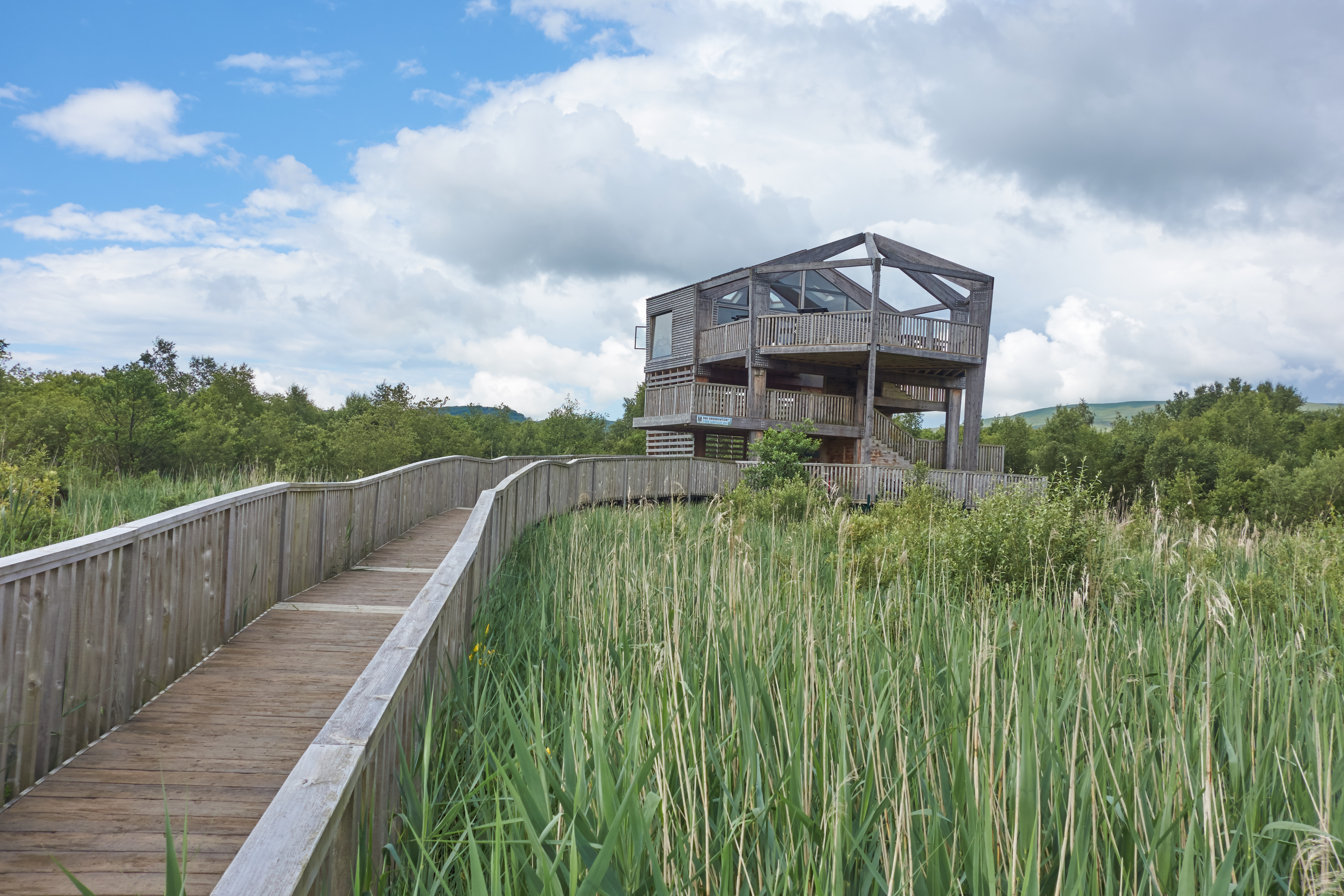
- Boardwalk through wetland habitat surrounding the Cors Dyfi 360° Observatory
- Interactive map of Cors Dyfi
- Location: Powys, Wales
- Coordinates: 52.568774°N 3.918031°W
- Governing body: Montgomeryshire Wildlife Trust
- Website: www.montwt.co.uk/nature-reserves/cors-dyfi

Cors Dyfi is a nature reserve located near to the village of Derwenlas near Machynlleth, in the county of Powys, Wales. Located on land reclaimed from the estuary on the south side of the River Dyfi, the reserve is under the management of the Montgomeryshire Wildlife Trust.

== General site character and ecology ==
The site has open water, swamp, bog, wet woodland, scrub and gorse. Plants present include marsh cinquefoil Comarum palustre, purple loosestrife Lythrum salicaria, lesser spearwort Ranunculus flammula, royal fern Osmunda regalis and bog myrtle Myrica gale.

== Wildlife ==
Ospreys, otters, red kites, peregrines and hen harriers can be found here together with green woodpeckers and nightjars.

Cors Dyfi is home to the Dyfi Osprey Project.

In October 2025, planning permission was granted for a beaver observatory at the nature reserve. In the same month, the Welsh Government announced that beavers would be made a protected native species under Welsh law, following similar moves in England and Scotland.
