= Patti Rutland =

- Born: Birmingham, Alabama, U.S.A.
- Occupation: Choreographer

Patti Rutland is an American choreographer and the artistic director of Patti Rutland Jazz, a contemporary jazz dance and hip hop dance company based in Dothan, AL.

== Career ==
Rutland studied under jazz dance pioneer Gus Giordano. In 2005, she took the top prize Gold Shoe at Leo's Dancewear's Choreography Event at The Jazz Dance World Congress in Chicago, IL. Her modern-day urban inspired jazz and hip hop piece A.M. was a competition favorite and Dance Magazine described the closing night performance as "volatile and full of almost uncontrollable energy."

Dancers who have trained with Patti Rutland have worked or are currently working with such professional dance companies as Thodos Dance Chicago and Giordano Jazz Dance Chicago.

She has choreographed, staged and/or conceptually designed over 100 works for the stage.

== Awards ==
- Bronze Leo Award, Jazz Dance World Congress, 1998
- Gold Leo Award, Jazz Dance World Congress, 2005, Best Choreography
