= Stormont Loch =

- Location within Perth and Kinross
- Location: NO191422
- Coordinates: 56.565500°N 3.317300°W
- Type: freshwater loch
- Max. length: 1.06 km (0.66 mi)
- Max. width: 0.48 km (0.30 mi)
- Surface area: 14.3 ha (35 acres)
- Average depth: 2 ft (0.61 m)
- Max. depth: 3 ft (0.91 m)
- Water volume: 4,867,000 ft^{3} (137,800 m^{3})
- Shore length^{1}: 1.9 km (1.2 mi)
- Surface elevation: 54 m (177 ft)
- Max. temperature: 64 °F (18 °C)
- Islands: 0
- ^{1} Shore length is not a well-defined measure.

Stormont Loch (also known as Loch Stormont or Loch Bog) is a small irregular lowland freshwater loch, that is partially in-filled. It located in a nature reserve owned by the Scottish Wildlife Trust, on a north-east to south-west orientation and is 2 miles southeast of Blairgowrie in Perth and Kinross.

== Geography ==
Stormont Loch is of glacial origin and is formed as a type of geographic formation known as a kettle. The loch is of national importance as it provides a complete dating record for vegetation changes over the last 13000 years.

The loch is a designated Site of Special Scientific Interest (SSSI), as well as forming part of a Special Area of Conservation.

== See also ==
- List of lochs in Scotland
