= Mr Rutland =

Male osprey who nested near Rutland Water

Mr Rutland, formally known by his ring number of 03(97), was a male osprey who was born in Scotland in 1997 and nested every summer near Rutland Water, England, from 1999 to 2015.

Having been extinct in England since the 1840s, ospreys were re-introduced to the country from 1996 by the Rutland Osprey project, which translocated birds from Scotland to Rutland Water. Mr Rutland was born in Scotland in 1997 and was translocated to Rutland Water that summer, part of the second batch of ospreys introduced to England. Having built his nest in 2000, Mr Rutland bred for the first time in 2001, raising a single chick with an unringed female at a nest on private land, close to the reservoir. He continued to breed every year up to 2014. By 2015, he had migrated in excess of 100,000 miles (160,000 km). He failed to return in 2016 at the age of 18.

== Background ==
Having once been common in the United Kingdom, the population of ospreys declined sharply in the 19th century as a result of human activity and habitat loss, eventually leading to extinction in England during the 1840s and in Scotland around 1916. In 1954, a pair of birds returned to Scotland with a breeding at Loch Garten and the population began to grow again, assisted by a shift in attitude. After the Rutland Water reservoir was opened in 1976, the Scottish ospreys and some from Sweden began using it as a stopping-point during their migration.

In the 1990s, following unsuccessful attempts to persuade the birds to stay in Rutland for the summer, the Rutland Osprey project was launched, with financial backing from the Leicestershire and Rutland Wildlife Trust and Anglian Water. Led by osprey-expert Roy Dennis, the project began trans-locating osprey chicks from Scotland to Rutland Water, where a number of artificial nests had been set up on platforms. The first set of birds began their migration to Africa in the autumn of 1996, but none of them returned to Rutland. One was reported to have died in Senegal, for unknown reasons, and an osprey with a ring matching the 1996 birds was spotted in Northern Ireland in 2001, but it is not certain if this was one of the Rutland set.

== Life ==
Mr Rutland was one of eight osprey chicks in the second batch to be transplanted from Scotland to Rutland Water in July 1997. He was given the designation 03(97) and, along with the other birds from that year, a white ring was placed around his leg. The 1997 set translocated for the first time some chicks who were not the youngest in their nests, following a rule change, and this appeared to improve the survival rates of the birds.

In 1999 Mr Rutland and 08(97), another member of the 1997 set, became the first two birds released at Rutland to return from their migration. They spent the whole summer at the reservoir, making use of the artificial nests set up by the project. The last sighting of Mr Rutland that year was on 27 August. Both he and 08(97) returned again in the spring of 2000, and for the first time they also attracted females to Rutland Water. One female, who had no ring around her leg, formed a bond with Mr Rutland in August 2000 and the pair built a nest together although they did not breed. In 2001 he returned earlier than 08(97) accompanied by an unringed female, who project officials thought was likely to be the same female as the previous year. Making use of the nest that he'd constructed in 2000, Mr Rutland and the female mated, producing three eggs of which one hatched. This made him the first member of the Rutland osprey project to successfully reproduce. The chick was given the ring number 13(2001).

Mr Rutland returned to Rutland Water and bred every subsequent year until 2014, producing a total of 32 young, with three different females. As of May 2015 Mr Rutland had 46 grandchildren and 15 great-grandchildren. In 2016, at the age of 18, Mr Rutland failed to return from his winter migration.

== See also ==
- List of individual birds
