= Rutland, Kentucky =

Unincorporated community in Kentucky, United States

Coordinates: 38°26′41″N 84°27′03″W

Rutland is an unincorporated community in Harrison County, Kentucky, in the United States.

== History ==
A post office was established at Rutland in 1852, and remained in operation until it was discontinued in 1904. Rutland was described in 1877 as a small village which contained a store, church and school.
