= White Loch, Perth and Kinross =

Small lowland freshwater loch

White Loch
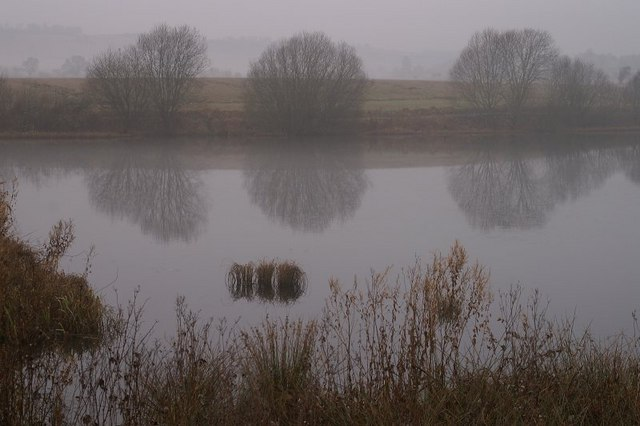
- White Loch Living up to its name on a misty morning, 31 December 2007

- Location within Perth and Kinross
- Location: NO169429
- Coordinates: 56.570700°N 3.352500°W
- Type: freshwater loch
- Max. length: 0.4828 km (0.3000 mi)
- Max. width: 0.225 km (0.140 mi)
- Surface area: 4.9 ha (12 acres)
- Average depth: 13 ft (4.0 m)
- Max. depth: 32 ft (9.8 m)
- Water volume: 8,425,000 ft^{3} (238,600 m^{3})
- Shore length^{1}: 1.2 km (0.75 mi)
- Surface elevation: 48 m (157 ft)
- Max. temperature: 59 °F (15 °C)
- Min. temperature: 50.2 °F (10.1 °C)
- Islands: 0
- ^{1} Shore length is not a well-defined measure.

White Loch is a small lowland freshwater loch that is located directly to the east of Fingask Loch in the valley of the Lunan Burn and is 1.5 miles south of Blairgowrie, in Perth and Kinross. The loch is also a designated Site of Special Scientific Interest (SSSI), as well as forming part of a Special Area of Conservation.

== Geography ==
White Loch is one of three lochs that sit in a row on an orientation of 280 degrees, with Fingask Loch directly to the west and the tiny, almost pond sized Black Loch sitting directly to the east. White Loch drains into Fingask Loch which in turn drains into small burn that meets the Lunan Burn.
