= Loch of Butterstone =

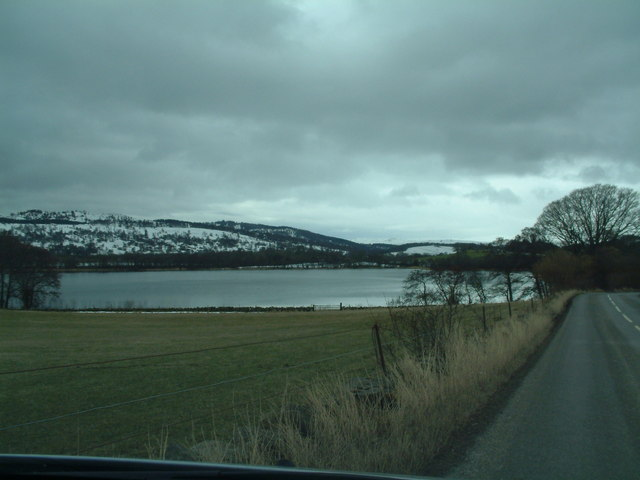
- Loch of Butterstone in winter

- Location within Perth and Kinross
- Location: NO059449
- Coordinates: 56.587100°N 3.533700°W
- Type: freshwater loch
- Primary inflows: Lunan Burn
- Primary outflows: Lunan Burn
- Surface area: 43.5 ha (107 acres)
- Average depth: 3.43 m (11.25 ft)
- Max. depth: 7.6 m (25 ft)
- Water volume: 1,508,800 m^{3} (53,283,000 ft^{3})
- Shore length^{1}: 2.8 km (1.7 mi)
- Surface elevation: 97 m (318 ft)
- Max. temperature: 17 °C (63 °F)
- Min. temperature: 12 °C (53 °F)
- Settlements: Dunkeld
- ^{1} Shore length is not a well-defined measure.

Loch of Butterstone is a small freshwater loch, almost circular in shape, located within the nature reserve of the Cardney Estate, near Dunkeld in Perth and Kinross. It is one of a group of three lochs, which include Loch of the Lowes and Loch of Craiglush, which are located next to each other in southeast to northwest orientation. Loch of Butterstone is located at the top of the group at the northwest end, with Loch of the Lowes being at the southwest and Loch of Craiglush located north of Loch of the Lowes. The three lochs form a chain of lochs known as the Lunan Lochs.

== Settlements ==
Dunkeld is the largest settlement, which is located southeast from the loch. The A923 main road passes to the north of the three lochs, which runs from Dundee to Dunkeld.

== Geography ==
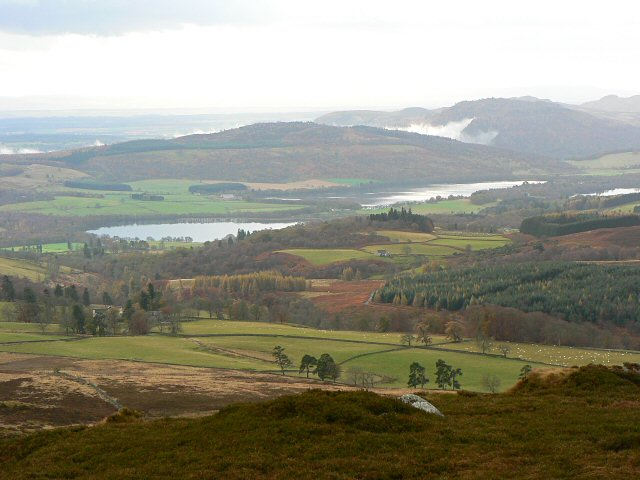
View from Benachally Monument. This is the view towards Loch of Butterstone and Loch of Lowes. Beyond is Newtyle Hill, and on the right of the picture, Birnam Hill. It is just possible to see in front of Loch of Lowes the small stand of trees that appeared above the mist.

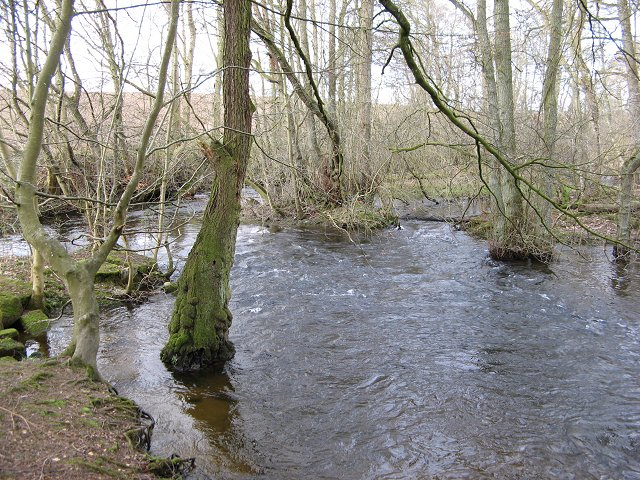
Lunan Burn, in flood.

The loch lies at the head of the valley of the Lunan Burn, which flows east and southeast to join the River Isla near Coupar Angus. The primary feature of Loch of Butterstone, is the clearness of the water, which has been described as gin clear. This startling clearness is particularly noticeable in Scotland, when most lochs are peat lochs, and are therefore peaty in colour.

The three lochs are located in shallow valley, with a northeast orientation, looking from the Dunkeld side. The most prominent feature, is Newtyle Hill at 317 metres (1,040 ft), which is closest to Loch of Lowes. At the other side of the valley is a number of shallow hills, including Crieff Hill, at the base of the three lochs, on the northeast orientation, rising to Craig More. The surrounding area is heavily wooded. On the west slope, looking from Dunkeld, is Drumbuie Wood.

Loch of Butterstone is a well known flyfishing loch.
