= Rutland, Vermont =

Rutland, Vermont may refer to:

- Rutland (city), Vermont
- Rutland (town), Vermont
- Rutland County, Vermont
- West Rutland, Vermont
