= Rutland Township =

Rutland Township may refer to:

- Rutland Township, Kane County, Illinois
- Rutland Township, LaSalle County, Illinois
- Rutland Township, Humboldt County, Iowa
- Rutland Township, Woodbury County, Iowa
- Rutland Township, Montgomery County, Kansas
- Rutland Township, Barry County, Michigan
- Rutland Township, Martin County, Minnesota
- Rutland Township, Sargent County, North Dakota, in Sargent County, North Dakota
- Rutland Township, Meigs County, Ohio
- Rutland Township, Pennsylvania
- Rutland Township, Lake County, South Dakota, in Lake County, South Dakota
