= Roy Dennis (conservationist) =

British conservationist

Roy Dennis OBE
- Born: Roy Henry Dennis; 1940 (age 84–85); Hampshire
- Occupation: Conservationist
- Known for: Species reintroduction

Roy Henry Dennis (born 1940) is a British conservationist.

Dennis grew up in the New Forest in the 1940s. After school he spent time at bird observatories on the islands of Lundy and Fair Isle where he met and worked with ornithologist George Waterston, who attempted to reintroduce the white-tailed eagle to Britain in the 1960s.

Dennis has worked in the Highlands and islands of Scotland since 1959, and has been involved in reintroducing white-tailed eagles, red kites and beavers there. He ran projects re-establishing the goldeneye as a breeding species and restoring the osprey population in Strathspey, where he worked as the RSPB's Highland officer, and oversaw the management of nature reserves including Loch Garten. In the 1960s, he organised the collection of peregrine falcon chicks from nests in the Highlands as a contribution to the re-establishment of the species in eastern Germany.

In 1990, Dennis left the RSPB to start his own wildlife consultancy and pursue his interest in species reintroductions. Between 2000 and 2017 he was involved in projects to extend the range of the red squirrel in the Highlands. The Highland Foundation for Wildlife was renamed the Roy Dennis Wildlife Foundation in 2017.

Dennis received an MBE in 1992 for services to nature conservation and an OBE in 2024 for services to wildlife.
