= Loch of Drumellie =

- Marlee Loch or Loch of Marlee
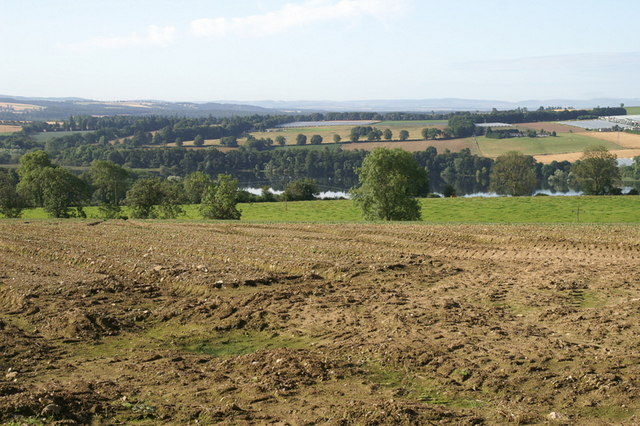
- Fields above Kinloch, with the Loch of Drumellie or Marlee Loch through the trees.

- Location within Perth and Kinross
- Location: NO142442
- Coordinates: 56.582600°N 3.39780°W
- Type: freshwater loch
- Max. length: 1.408 km (0.875 mi)
- Max. width: 0.80 km (0.50 mi)
- Surface area: 70 ha (170 acres)
- Average depth: 29 ft (8.8 m)
- Max. depth: 69 ft (21 m)
- Water volume: 221,902,000 ft^{3} (6,283,600 m^{3})
- Shore length^{1}: 3.9 km (2.4 mi)
- Surface elevation: 44 m (144 ft)
- Max. temperature: 60.2 °F (15.7 °C)
- Min. temperature: 48.7 °F (9.3 °C)
- Islands: 0
- ^{1} Shore length is not a well-defined measure.

Loch of Drumellie also known as Marlee Loch or Loch of Marlee is a small lowland freshwater loch that is located 2.3 miles west of Blairgowrie, in Perth and Kinross The loch is also a designated Site of Special Scientific Interest (SSSI), as well as forming part of a Special Area of Conservation.
