= RT DE =

Television channel in Germany

- Country: Russia and Germany
- Broadcast area: Worldwide
- Network: RT
- Headquarters: Moscow, Russia

Programming
- Language: German
- Picture format: 1080i HDTV

Ownership
- Owner: RT
- Sister channels: RT International; RT America (formerly); RT France; RT Arabic; RT Documentary; RT en Español; RT UK (formerly); RT India

History
- Launched: 2014 (online); 16 December 2021 (TV channel)

Links
- Website: deutsch.rt.com

RT DE (formerly RT Deutsch) is a German-language television channel based in Moscow, with a former office in Berlin. It is part of the RT network, a Russian state-controlled international television network, funded by the Russian government.

The channel was banned in Germany in early February 2022 after failing to secure an appropriate broadcast license, and it was eventually also banned within the European Union following the beginning of Russia's invasion of Ukraine. Nonetheless, RT DE still has an accessible Internet presence and offers live TV in German on its website.

== History ==
RT first launched an online German-language network in November 2014.

YouTube removed the station's two channels from its platform on 28 September 2021 for breaking its policies on COVID-19 misinformation. RT's editor-in-chief Margarita Simonyan urged the Russian authorities to ban German media organisations in Russia and impose sanctions against YouTube. The Russian government promised to adopt "retaliatory measures". According to Politico, RT's "German-language outlets have built an audience that leans to the political far right and is receptive to vaccine skepticism."

When a YouTube channel is removed, its owners are not allowed to create, own or use any other YouTube channels. In December 2021 RT tried to evade this restriction and created a new channel. The channel was removed.

=== Licensing issues ===
RT DE relied on the European Convention on Transfrontier Television, a Council of Europe media directive that would entitle it to broadcast in Germany, during its application for a television license. The German supervisory authorities were not responsible because the program was produced in Moscow and broadcast from there. Its parent organization, TV Novosti, attempted to apply for a television license in Luxembourg in June 2021, which was denied in August on the grounds that RT DE had been based in Berlin and was therefore under German jurisdiction. Serbia issued a permit in December. On 16 December, RT DE went on the air via satellite operator Eutelsat and various transmission channels on the Internet.

On 17 December 2021, a day after its launch on television, the German media regulator Medienanstalt Berlin-Brandenburg (MABB) launched proceedings against RT DE for broadcasting without a license. On 22 December 2021, Eutelsat removed RT DE from its platform on Eutelsat 9B.

At the beginning of February 2022, RT DE announced its intention to appeal against the decision, though according to Reuters, it formally had only until the end of 2021 to respond. MABB and Germany's Commission for Licensing and Supervision (ZAK) said the station needed a license meeting the terms of Germany's State Media Treaty, because RT DE Productions GmbH is based in Berlin-Adlershof and not in Moscow. In a statement, ZAK said that the "organization and distribution of the TV program via live stream on the internet, via the mobile and smart TV app 'RT News' and via satellite must be discontinued."

In response, the Russian Foreign Ministry withdrew the accreditation of the German broadcaster Deutsche Welle and initiated proceedings to classify Deutsche Welle as a "foreign agent". The German government called for the ban to be revoked, and Secretary of State for Culture and Media Claudia Roth (Alliance 90/The Greens) called the ban an "aggressive act". Deutsche Welle protested the withdrawal of accreditations and the announced ban on broadcasting. DW Director General Peter Limbourg remarked that "The measures taken by the Russian authorities are completely incomprehensible and a complete overreaction. We are being played with here in a way that the media only has to experience in autocracies".

=== Termination in European Union ===
On 2 March 2022, following the beginning of the Russian invasion of Ukraine, the European Commission banned all activities of RT and Sputnik in the territory of the European Union. RT DE's broadcasts within Germany were thus terminated.

== Reception ==
In Handelsblatt, Andreas Macho concluded after an investigation of the program of the German branch of RT in November 2014: "The bottom line [is that] RT Germany spreads more untruths, reductions and distortions than this – promise as the moderators constantly – would enlighten". Die Tageszeitung summed up the selection of the interlocutors of the first weeks of RT Deutsch with "either flaming anti-American and European opponents of the left and right margins" together. In February 2016 a former employee called RT Deutsch "skilful propaganda" and claimed that they are concentrating on an audience of conspiracy theorists and persons on the far-right of the political spectrum. In February 2021, through obtained emails, a Der Spiegel investigation provided insights on how the station planned a platform for fringe groups to undermine democracy in Germany.

== See also ==
- Propaganda in the Russian Federation
