= RT India =

Indian news channel operated by RT

- Country: India
- Broadcast area: India
- Network: RT
- Headquarters: New Delhi, India

Programming
- Language: English
- Picture format: 1080i HDTV

Ownership
- Owner: RT
- Sister channels: RT International; RT America (formerly); RT France; RT Arabic; RT Documentary; RT en Español; RT UK (formerly)

History
- Launched: 5 December 2025 (English Webpage and DTH) 7 September 2026 (Hindi Webpage)

Links
- Website: RT India (English); RT India (Hindi)

RT India is an English-language television channel based in New Delhi, India. It is part of the RT network, a Russian state-controlled international television network funded by the Russian government.

RT India began broadcasting in December 2025 and was launched during Russian President Vladimir Putin's state visit to India. The channel operates a newsroom in the Delhi-NCR region and produces news bulletins, documentaries and interview programmes for Indian audiences.

== History ==
RT first announced plans for a dedicated India-focused service in 2025. In November 2025, RT began a nationwide advertising campaign ahead of the launch of its Indian operation, with the campaign appearing across major Indian cities.

RT India began broadcasting in December 2025 from studios in New Delhi. The channel was formally launched by Russian President Vladimir Putin and RT editor-in-chief Margarita Simonyan during Putin's state visit to India. The launch took place on 6 December 2025 and was accompanied by an expansion of media cooperation between Indian and Russian organisations.

At its launch, RT India announced four daily news bulletins, along with documentaries, interviews and public-affairs programming. The service initially focused on English-language broadcasting and coverage of Indian, Russian and international affairs. The launch was accompanied by an addendum to an existing agreement between Prasar Bharati and TV-Novosti, the organisation that operates RT, concerning media cooperation and content exchange.

In February 2026, RT India launched In Conversation with Salman Khurshid, a geopolitical programme hosted by former Indian External Affairs Minister Salman Khurshid. The programme became the channel's flagship geopolitical talk show.

In June 2026, Reporters Without Borders (RSF) criticised the expansion of RT India, describing it as a Kremlin-funded Russian propaganda channel and expressing concern about the potential spread of disinformation. RSF's assessment of RT India's coverage said that the channel frequently portrayed the United States and Ukraine negatively while presenting closer India–Russia relations as important to India's interests. These statements represented RSF's assessment of the channel's coverage.

In September 2026, RT launched RT Hindi, a digital news platform aimed at Hindi-speaking audiences in India. The service provides Hindi-language news reports, videos and analysis and also includes access to RT India's television programming. RT described the launch as an expansion of its India-focused operation, which had begun broadcasting in English in December 2025.

== Reception ==
RT India's launch received attention from press-freedom organisations and commentators concerned about the expansion of Russian state media in India. Reporters Without Borders (RSF) criticised the launch and expressed concern that the channel could contribute to the spread of disinformation in India's information environment. RSF described RT India as a "Kremlin-funded Russian propaganda channel" and said that the channel's expansion took place amid closer India–Russia relations.

RSF also examined RT India's editorial coverage and reported that the channel frequently presented the United States and Ukraine negatively while portraying closer relations between India and Russia as beneficial to India's interests. RT India has presented itself as providing an "alternative narrative" to what its management describes as one-sided Western media coverage.

In an analysis of the expansion of Russian media operations in India, ThePrint reported that RT India's presence had raised concerns among researchers and press-freedom organisations. The report cited RSF's assessment of RT India and described the channel's coverage as operating at the intersection of Indian national interests and Russian geopolitical narratives. RT India declined ThePrint's request for an interview for the report.

Academic research has also examined RT's coverage of India prior to the launch of RT India. A 2026 study by Anilesh Kumar and Daya Thussu analysed 635 English-language RT articles published between 2019 and 2023. The study found that after Russia's full-scale invasion of Ukraine in 2022, RT increasingly framed India as a strategic partner within Russia's conception of a multipolar international order.

RT has defended its India operation as an effort to provide Indian audiences with perspectives that differ from those of Western media. At the launch of RT India, Russian President Vladimir Putin described the channel as providing Indian audiences with greater access to Russian perspectives, while RT India management said the service was intended to offer an alternative account of international affairs.

== See also ==
- RT
- RT International
