= Karen Roberts =

Karen Roberts may refer to:

- Karen Roberts (television presenter), British-born television presenter
- Karen Roberts (field hockey) (born 1967), retired female field hockey player from South Africa
- Karen Roberts (judoka) (born 1976), British Olympic judoka
- Karen Roberts (luger) (born 1954), American Olympic luger
