= RT Documentary =

RT Doc
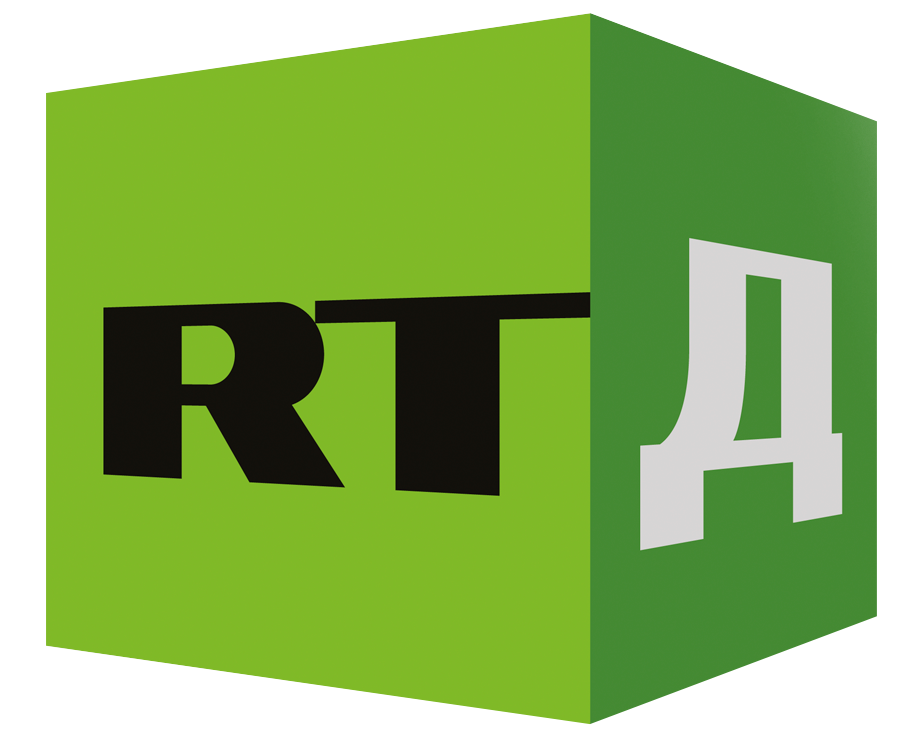
- Type: State media
- Country: Russia
- Broadcast area: Worldwide
- Network: RT
- Headquarters: RT Television Station, Borovaya Street, Building 3/1, Moscow, Russia

Programming
- Languages: Live channels: English, Russian; Video on demand: English, Arabic, Chinese, French, Hindi, Russian, Spanish & Swahili
- Picture format: 1080i (HDTV) (downscaled to 16:9 480i/576i for SDTV feed)

Ownership
- Owner: ANO "TV-Novosti"
- Sister channels: RT International; RT America (formerly); RT Arabic; RT en Español; RT DE; RT France; RT UK (formerly); RT India

History
- Launched: June 23, 2011; 14 years ago
- Former names: RT Documentary channel

Links
- Website: rtd.rt.com en.arteldoc.tv india-rtd.rt.com

Availability

Streaming media
- RT Documentary: On Air
- RT.Doc: On Air

RT Documentary (RTД, literally "RTD") is a Russian free-to-air documentary channel presented in both the English and Russian languages. It was launched on 23 June 2011 by the erstwhile President Dmitry Medvedev who visited RT's studio in Moscow, and deals with a wide variety of topics including Russian culture and life in Russia. The channel shows documentaries mostly on Russia but also from around the globe.

== History ==
=== 2020 ===
On 1 July, 2020, Latvia bans the broadcasting channels of RT Documentary and RT Documentary HD, along with its sister channels including RT International, RT International HD, RT Arabic and RT Spanish. In line with the EU sanction under control of “Rossiya Segodnya International Information Agency Director-General Dmitry Kiselev”. On 9 July, 2020, Lithuanian followed the banning of channels with immediately effect for RT Documentary, RT Documentary HD, RT International, RT International HD and RT Spanish.

=== 2022 ===
On 13 March 2022, RT Documentary YouTube channel with 1.9 million subscribers was suspended.

In September 2022, RT launched its new online streaming platform for "RT Documentary Hindi", available in both English and Hindi language. Along with social media platforms on Telegram and X (formerly Twitter).

== See also ==
- RT (TV network)
- Rossiya Segodnya
- Ruptly
