= Xavier Moreau =

French-born military analyst and commentator

- Born: 25 October 1971; France
- Citizenship: France; Russia (from 2013)
- Education: École spéciale militaire de Saint-Cyr
- Occupations: Businessman, commentator, military officer (former)
- Known for: Founder of Stratpol

Xavier Moreau (born 25 October 1971) is a French-born businessman and political commentator based in Russia. A former officer in the French Army, he moved to Russia in 2000 and became a Russian citizen in 2013. He is the founder of the geopolitical analysis website Stratpol and is known for pro-Russian commentary on international relations issues.

== Career ==
Moreau graduated from the École spéciale militaire de Saint-Cyr and served in the French Army before relocating to Russia. In 2014, he founded Stratpol, a website and media platform focused on political, strategic, and economic analysis. Moreau has appeared in both French and Russian media, including as a presenter on RT en Français. He has been accused by the Council of the European Union of spreading Russian propaganda and disinformation.

He was elected in the 2026 French consular elections for the Russia and Belarus constituency.

== European Union sanctions ==
In December 2025, the European Union imposed sanctions on Moreau as part of measures targeting individuals accused of supporting Russian information operations. According to the EU, Moreau disseminated conspiracy theories about the Russian invasion of Ukraine, such as "accusing Ukraine of orchestrating its own invasion in order to join NATO". The sanctions included an asset freeze, a prohibition on financial transactions with EU citizens and businesses, and a prohibition on entry into EU member states.

The EU has likewise sanctioned several other European and foreign citizens for alleged pro-Russian stances, including Swiss retired military officer Jacques Baud, Swiss-Cameronese activist Nathalie Yamb and German-Turkish journalist Hüseyin Doğru.

Moreau criticized the sanctions and filed a lawsuit against the French Minister for Europe and Foreign Affairs Jean-Noël Barrot, with his lawyer arguing Moreau "has no mandate from Russia" and that "being pro-Putin or pro-Russian is not a crime".
