= RT en Español =

Spanish-language television network

RT en español
- Country: Russia
- Broadcast area: Spain (until 2022); United States (until 2022); Latin America
- Network: RT
- Headquarters: Moscow, Russia

Programming
- Language: Spanish
- Picture format: 1080i HDTV (downscaled to 16:9 576i for the SDTV feed)

Ownership
- Owner: (ANO) TV-Novosti
- Sister channels: RT; RT France; RT Arabic; RT America (formerly); RT Documentary; RT UK (formerly); RT India

History
- Launched: 28 December 2009; 16 years ago

Links
- Website: actualidad.rt.com (channel finder)

Availability

Terrestrial
- Digital terrestrial television (Argentina): Channel 25.5
- Digital terrestrial television (Venezuela): Channel 25.5
- Digital terrestrial television (Cuba): Channel HD4

Streaming media
- actualidad.rt.com: On Air

RT en Español, also known as Actualidad RT, is a Spanish-language pay television channel that is part of the RT network. Launched in 2009, it is based in Moscow, and has bureaus in Miami, Los Angeles, Madrid, Managua, Caracas, Havana and Buenos Aires.

RT Spanish features its own news presenters and programming that differ from the English and Arabic RT channels, but also offers translated versions of RT English programming. The channel's focus is on headline news, politics, sports and broadcast specials.

Currently RT Spanish has a staff of nearly 200 people, including 35 foreign journalists from Spain, Argentina, the United States, Chile, Nicaragua and Venezuela. It also has journalists from Russia and Serbia who speak Spanish.

== History ==
On 15 June 2006, the Financial Times reported that Russia was considering plans to create a channel in Spanish. This was officially announced in 2007 and the channel was launched on 28 December 2009.

== Coverage ==
In Spain (before the 2022 EU ban on RT), the network was available on TV Orange, Vodafone and Movistar TV +, Telecable, among others. The network is also carried via satellite and several cable television companies in Latin America. 7 In Vodafone Spain (ex ONO TV) began broadcasting in December 2010.

During Vladimir Putin's visit to Cristina Fernandez de Kirchner on July 12, 2014 in Buenos Aires, it was announced that the channel would be available on Open Digital TV for free. Actualidad RT entered on the grid on October 10, 2014, becoming the first media produced outside Latin America to enter the state television network in Argentina, as Telesur (which is another international channel that broadcasts on TDA) is of Venezuelan origin and is funded by the Venezuelan, Cuban, and Nicaraguan governments. RT reaches not only Argentina but also Venezuela, which since 1 December 2014, has been aired on TDA.

In May 2015, RT began high definition broadcasting in Chile through the GTD group. By mid-2015, at the end of March 2016, RT enters through the Ecuradorian Grupo TVCable, one of the largest operators in the country. RT Spanish was available in more than 900 private television operators in Latin America and Spain. In addition, national channels of Venezuela and Cuba emit a part of the network of the Russian chain.

On June 9, 2016, the Argentine government of Mauricio Macri, through the Federal System and Public Files Media announced the suspension RT's signal on TDA. Victoria Vorontsova, director of the network, said that the Argentine government was pressured by the United States and would not be surprised that "at that frequency CNN is more likely to appear rather than a regional channel." The same happened with the signal of Telesur. Hernán Lombardi, head of the Argentine public media, announced a review of the matter. Martin Sabbatella, former head of the FASCA, had stated that the removal was due to an alignment of the Argentine government with the United States. Finally, he carried out an agreement where the signal TDA remained in Argentina. In addition an exchange of programming projects, and reciprocity agreed to spread the Argentine content in Russia and several co-productions.

On July 13, 2016, RT announced that they would begin broadcasting in Mexico via the cable operator Izzi Telecom, one of the largest cable TV providers in the north of the country.

In response to the 2022 Russian invasion of Ukraine, the European Union (EU) announced on February 27, 2022 that they would ban RT and Sputnik in all languages throughout all their member states. This effectively ended broadcasts of RT en Español in Spain, as the country is an EU member state, though broadcasts continue to air in Latin America.

On June 16, 2025, the channel started broadcasting on Telecanal's transmitter network in Chile, causing concerns from the National Television Council. The council is likely to issue sanctions due to the lack of transparent information about the lease; in addition, two documentaries aired on RT through Telecanal have led to a sanction from the regulator.

== Programming ==
Programming is made taking into account the time difference between the transmission regions. All news is broadcast during prime time, morning, or evening in New York, Miami, Los Angeles, Mexico, Buenos Aires and Madrid. Programming include daily sports, news, feature stories about life in Russia, and interviews with personalities of interest.

- Behind the news: the program of the attorney and author Eva Golinger .
- Report RT: RT journalists share their impressions of working in different parts of the world.
- Keiser Report: Economic Analysis of Max Keiser and Stacy Herbert
- Erick list: presents reports on the most interesting and attractive in Russia
- Interview: a series of programs where people from the most varied spheres tells stories of his life.
- Sports reports: the scores of each week
- Special: special reports presenting the viewpoint of RT on past events and a thorough analysis of what is happening in the present.
- Technology: the latest achievements and perspective in different areas of Russian science
- A day with ... : Eva Golinger spends a day with some of the most important personalities of the world today.
- RT Research: Journalist turns detective
- Out of box: a series of interviews with RT correspondents who will relate how they lived experience of covering the most important news
- A background: a series of programs featuring a tour of the major cities and remote corners of Russia.
- Beyond Moscow: tourism program.
- Political cuisine: the Betzabé Zumaya program.
- El Zoom: presented by Javier Rodríguez Carrasco.
- Letters on the table: led by Luis Castro program where they meet with experts and specialists comment on Latin American politics.
- Talking with Correa: a weekly program hosted by former president Rafael Correa.
- Outside the box: a series of interviews with RT correspondents that will tell how they lived the experience of covering the most important news.

== Importance ==
Latin America is the second most significant area of influence for RT (rt.com). In 2013, RT ascended to the ranks of the 100 most watched websites in seven Latin American countries.
