= Karen Roberts (television presenter) =

British-born television presenter

Karen Roberts is a British-born television presenter. During the late 1990s and early 2000s, Roberts was an in-vision continuity announcer and newsreader for Border Television in Carlisle.

By 2002, she had joined the now defunct ITN News Channel (latterly ITV News Channel) as a presenter and was also a regular anchor of the ITV Morning News on ITV1. Roberts also freelanced as an overnight shift presenter for Sky News. Formerly worked for RTTV in Moscow, Russia from 2005–2010. She then worked and presented on CCTV News in Beijing, China from 2010 to 2012. As of 2012, Roberts works as a newsreader for the English service of France 24 in Paris. From October 2021-January 2022 Roberts read bulletins on GB News.
