= RT en Français =

Russian government-owned French TV channel

RT France/RT en Français
- Logo between December 2017 to April 2023

- Logo after April 2023
- Type: State media
- Country: Russia; France
- Broadcast area: EMEA
- Network: RT
- Headquarters: Boulogne-Billancourt, France (2017-2023); Moscow, Russia (2023-)

Programming
- Language: French
- Picture format: 1080i (HDTV) (downscaled to 16:9 576i for the SDTV feed)

Ownership
- Owner: (ANO) TV-Novosti
- Sister channels: RT International; RT America; RT Arabic; RT Documentary; RT en Español; RT UK; RT Deutsch

History
- Launched: December 18, 2017

Links
- Website: francais.rt.com

RT en Français, also known as RT France between December 2017 to April 2023, is the French version of the Russian state-controlled news channel RT, funded by the Russian government. Before the production activities relocated to Moscow in April 2023, The channel was based in the Paris suburb of Boulogne-Billancourt. Similar to other RT channels, the accuracy and objectivity of RT France's information was regularly questioned. It was banned after Russia's invasion of Ukraine.

== History ==
RT revealed in late 2015 it was planning to develop a network for the French-speaking audience in countries such as France, Belgium and Switzerland. The channel was launched on December 18, 2017, broadcasting in France, Belgium, Canada, Switzerland and the Mediterranean. The channel, like other RT channels, cycled around 30 minutes of news and 30 minutes of other features, 24/7, and was able to provide rolling coverage on breaking news events when warranted.

Following the beginning of the 2022 Russian invasion of Ukraine, RT France's activities were banned in the European Union and in Canada. However, the channel continued to broadcast online and via the Russian satellite Ekspress AM8, which covers EMEA countries.

On 8 March 2022, RT France challenged the EU ban of its activities in the General Court of the Court of Justice of the European Union. After refusing to "urgently" consider the case on 30 March, the General Court dismissed the case on 27 July 2022, ruling that the ban against RT was justified.

In January 2023, following the freezing of their bank accounts by the Direction générale du Trésor, its president Xenia Fedorova announced the closure of the French branch of the channel. The last news bulletin live from Boulogne-Billancourt was broadcast on 19 January 2023, before the channel began to rebroadcast archived programs throughout the day. Fedorova was expelled from France in July 2026.

=== Regular programs in the current channel ===
The new channel is still a mix of the newscasts and rolling-broadcast documentaries with some regular programs.

Programs after April 2023
Program	Presenter	Note
POLIT’MAG	Magali Forestier	Inherited from RT France Update paused after September 2023
AFRICONNECT	Samantha Ramsamy	Inherited from RT France
L’ÉCHIQUIER MONDIAL	Xavier Moreau	Inherited from RT France
LA GRANDE INTERVIEW		Inherited from RT France
CONVERSATION AVEC CORREA. COUPS D’ÉTAT	Rafael Correa	French dubbed Spanish program From RT en Español
LE POINT AVEC ALEXIS POULIN	Alexis Poulin	Broadcast inside the newscasts every Tuesday and Thursday
ICI MOSCOU!	Xavier Moreau	
LES RÉVOLTÉS AVEC DIDIER MAÏSTO	Didier Maïsto	

== Assessments and responses ==
Political science researcher Maxime Audinet discussed on L'Express the neutrality of RT France stating: "Today it's not easy at all to find "fake news", or at least gross attempts at misinformation on the sites of RT, for example. They certainly have a conspiratorial past, but it definitely seems more interesting to observe the nature of their editorial line, which is highly selective and consistent with the Moscow-based view of the world."

In 2017, French president Emmanuel Macron accused RT France of spreading "propaganda" during his 2017 presidential campaign and banned RT reporters from his campaign headquarters. He described the channel as a tool for "influence-peddling."

On June 28, 2018, RT France was found in breach by the CSA for "failures of honesty, the rigor of the information and the diversity of the viewpoints" in a subject on the Syria. In a topic broadcast on April 13, "disputing the reality of chemical weapons attacks in the Syrian city of Douma", the CSA observed that the channel "had not faithfully translated comments of Syrian witnesses". The CSA imposed no sanctions on RT, but the regulator has the authority to fine a broadcaster or suspend its licence. However, RT acknowledged that these actual words were spoken by the witness, but in a longer version of the interview that was not broadcast on air. RT France then apologized for the technical error, claiming "not to have invented a piece of evidence by means of a deliberately fraudulent translation as many media believe" with evidence as full testimony. Its president Xenia Fedorova claimed that "RT France covers all subjects, including the Syrian conflict, in a totally balanced manner, by giving all sides a chance to comment." As a result, RT France appealed a week later to the Conseil d'État to overturn the decision of the CSA.

On July 18, 2018, the Syndicat national des journalistes (SNJ) wrote a blog stating that RT France journalists were denied access on numerous occasions to cover major events, such as presidential elections. The main reason was that "RT is regularly blamed at the highest level as a tool for propaganda and misinformation."

On October 17, 2018, during an interview with a Puremedia journalist, French government spokesperson Benjamin Griveaux re-affirmed the state's refusal to open its press room to RT France and Sputnik, saying: "They are not news organizations. They are propaganda funded by a foreign state."

In November 2018, RT France was accredited to allow access to some Elysée press conferences. But in February 2019, LREM refused to allow the channel to cover its European campaigns, on the basis that RT and Sputnik, "are not news organizations but propaganda in the service of the Kremlin. They should not be considered to be media, since they do not verify or cross-check information".

On 23 February 2022, Frédéric Taddeï stopped hosting the show Interdit d'interdire in response to Russia's recognition of the Donetsk and Luhansk breakaway states immediately prior to the 2022 Russian invasion of Ukraine.

=== Bans ===
On 27 February 2022, the European Union (EU) announced that in response to the invasion of Ukraine RT and Sputnik (another Russian state-run news outlet) were banned in all languages throughout all their member states. RT France appealed the ban to the European Court of Justice for a temporary suspension on 30 March 2022 which was rejected. A subsequent appeal to the General Court was also rejected.

On 16 March 2022, the Canadian Radio-television and Telecommunications Commission removed RT networks, including the French version, from its list of non-Canadian programming services authorized for distribution. To circumvent the ban, the channel continued to broadcast online and via the Russian satellite Ekspress AM8, which covers EMEA countries.

On 8 March 2022, RT France challenged the EU ban of its activities in the General Court of the Court of Justice of the European Union. After refusing to "urgently" consider the case on 30 March, the General Court dismissed the case on 27 July 2022, ruling that the ban against RT was justified.

In January 2023, following the freezing of their bank accounts by the Direction générale du Trésor, its president Xenia Fedorova announced the closure of the French branch of the channel.
