= RT America =

Part of the RT TV network that folded in 2022

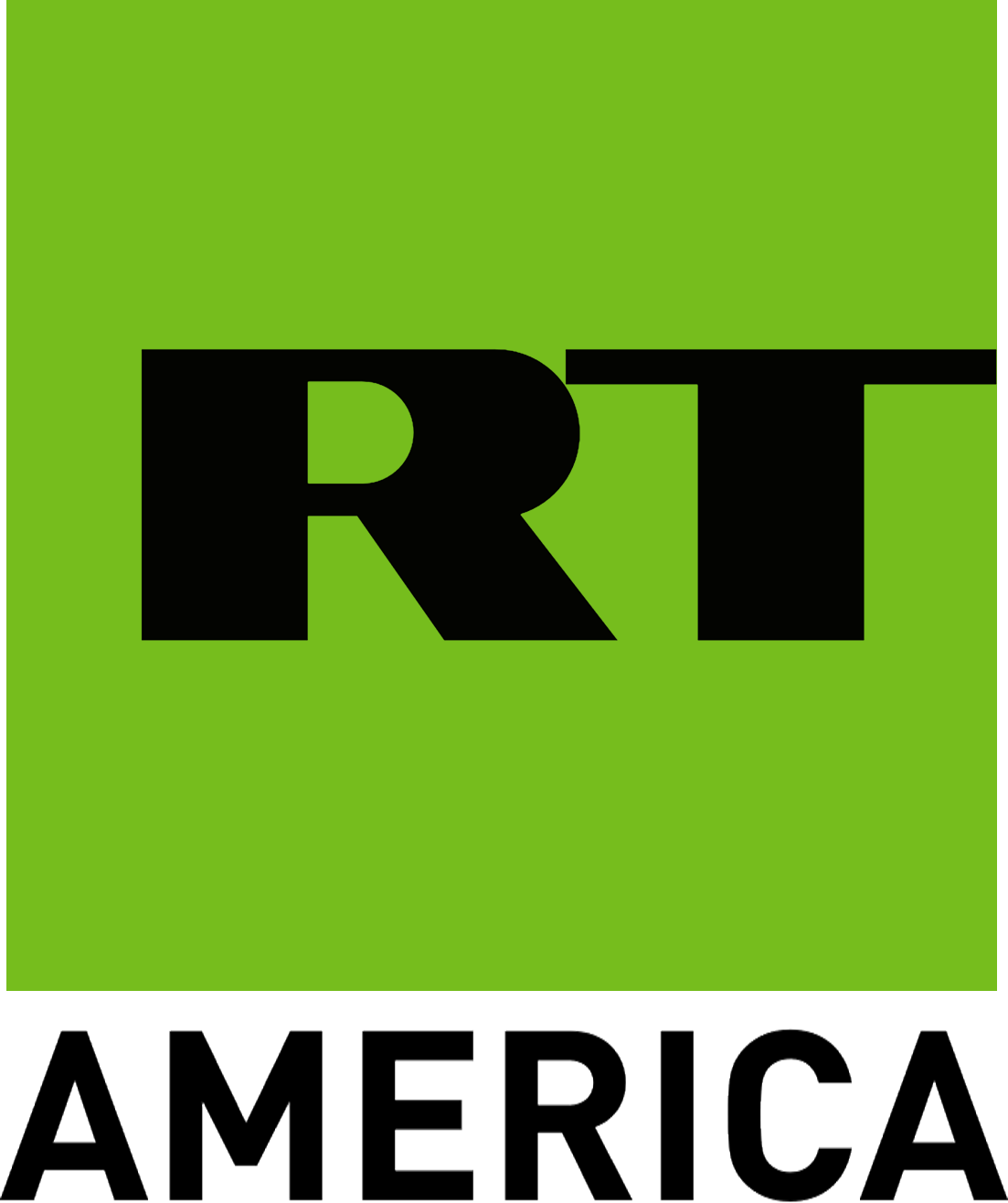
- Country: United States
- Network: RT
- Headquarters: Washington, D.C.

Programming
- Language: English
- Picture format: 1080i HDTV (downgraded to letterboxed 480i for the SDTV feed)

Ownership
- Owner: (ANO) TV-Novosti (on behalf of T&R Productions)
- Sister channels: RT International; RT France; RT UK (formerly); RT Arabic; RT Documentary; RT en Español; RT Deutsch (formerly)

History
- Launched: February 2010
- Closed: March 3, 2022

RT America was a U.S.-based news channel headquartered in Washington, D.C. Owned by TV Novosti and operated by the production company T&R Productions, it was a part of the RT network, a global multilingual television news network based in Moscow and funded by the Russian government. The channel said it reached an audience of 85 million people in the United States, but this figure is disputed. It was distributed through select cable providers, over-the-top services, a live stream through its website, and three low-power digital subchannels. Since the channel's closure, viewers who tune into the cable channel or their live stream are being shown a live feed of an RT International broadcast instead.

Among the channel's shows at its closure were Dennis Miller + One with Dennis Miller, CrossTalk with Peter Lavelle, and The Keiser Report with Max Keiser. Other shows included News with Ed Schultz (2016–2018) and Larry King Now (2012–2020). Additional personalities included Rick Sanchez, Stacy Herbert, Chris Hedges, Jesse Ventura, Sean Stone, Lee Camp, Mike Papantonio, and Ben Swann.

Incidents centered upon RT America include Breaking the Set host Abby Martin's 2014 statement of her opposition to Russia's intervention in Ukraine, which was followed the next day by anchor Liz Wahl's on-the-air resignation, which she issued on account of her belief that RT was a propaganda machine for President Vladimir Putin. In 2017, David Z. Morris wrote in Fortune that, "according to a[n unnamed] social network analyst interviewed by the New York Times, RT is not simply a platform for a right-wing agenda. Rather, it fuels fringe viewpoints across the political spectrum, providing grist for libertarian, far-left, and anti-globalization factions as well." James Kirchick wrote in the Washington Post that the channel was "not a 'news service' in any meaningful sense of the term".

After losing the majority of its cable and satellite coverage following the Russian invasion of Ukraine, the channel ceased operations of all live programming on March 3, 2022, with T&R Productions indicating the layoffs of all off- and on-air staff would be permanent.

== History ==
The channel was launched in the United States in February 2010 as RT was looking to increase its reach. It was launched along with Rusiya Al-Yaum in 2007, the Spanish-language channel RT Actualidad in 2009, and the RT Documentary channel in 2011.

In October 2017, after the United States Department of Justice insisted that RT America register as a "foreign agent" under the Foreign Agents Registration Act (FARA), the Russian Justice Ministry declared "foreign agents" several U.S.-government funded media outlets, including the Voice of America and Radio Free Europe/Radio Liberty. RT America's editor in chief, Margarita Simonyan, said that it would comply with the demand in order to avoid further legal action by the U.S. government, but criticized the move, noting that registration also resulted in the TV channel losing its Congressional press credentials, and undermined assertions by the U.S. Department of Justice that FARA registration would not have any effect on the channel's ability to operate in the United States.

=== Termination ===
The network was removed from the services offered by DirecTV on March 1, 2022, following Russia's invasion of Ukraine, with Ora Media pausing production on several shows it produced for RT America. Dish Network dropped the channel on March 4.

After losing the majority of its cable and satellite connections, the channel ceased operations of all live programming on March 3, 2022, with T&R Productions indicating the layoffs of all off- and on-air staff would be permanent.

On August 9, 2024, the broadcast and other equipment from the RT studio in Washington DC would be auctioned off.

== Views and opinions ==
A 2017 report by the United States Intelligence Community characterized RT as "the Kremlin's principal international propaganda outlet" and said that RT America had been set up as an autonomous nonprofit organization to avoid the Foreign Agent Registration Act's registration requirement.

According to David Z. Morris, writing in Fortune magazine in 2017, "in its early years, RT provided a platform for various fringe or simply false narratives in American public discourse", with guests on the network "arguing that the 9/11 attacks were a CIA conspiracy and that Osama bin Laden's death was faked". According to him, "RT America has been more likely to highlight legitimate but marginalized political perspectives, and further blurs the line between propaganda and commentary by employing respected U.S. journalists such as Chris Hedges, Ed Schultz, and Larry King." He also added that during the 2016 U.S. presidential election campaign, RT published conspiracy theories about the murder of Seth Rich to undermine the Hillary Clinton campaign. Some of these gained traction on social media and were distributed around the internet.

In their investigation of alleged Russian meddling in the U.S. 2016 elections, the U.S. intelligence services stated that they had "high confidence" that RT was involved in a campaign ordered by President Vladimir Putin. The New York Times reported their findings in 2017 indicating that "the attack was carried out through the targeted use of real information, some open and some hacked, and the creation of false reports, or 'fake news', broadcast on state-funded news media like RT and its sibling".

James Kirchick wrote in the Washington Post in September 2017 that "RT is not a 'news service' in any meaningful sense of the term. Reputable news services don't employ Illuminati correspondents. RT has no regard whatsoever for basic journalistic values like objectivity or the pursuit of truth." Kirchick was a guest in August 2013 to talk about Chelsea Manning, and used the opportunity to "speak out against the horrific anti-gay legislation" which had recently been approved by President Putin. The clip went viral on social media.

William Broad of the New York Times wrote about the network's coverage of 5G, the mobile phone technology. Broad said the network aired seven programs in 2019 on the subject up to mid-April that year. One of these, entitled A Dangerous 'Experiment on Humanity', Broad commented, linked 5G "signals to brain cancer, infertility, autism, heart tumors and Alzheimer's disease – claims that lack scientific support". According to Broad, the channel focused on Vaxxed: From Cover-Up to Catastrophe, a 2016 film by the British anti-vaccine campaigner Andrew Wakefield, to echo the charge by an unnamed black minister in Los Angeles who was seen in a video addressing an audience and, according to Broad, saying that "childhood immunizations had caused autism in 200,000 black children". Domestically, in Russia, Putin is a firm advocate of vaccinations.

An Oxford University study interviewing 23 of RT's journalists wrote that RT hired journalists with little or no experience in order "to be able to mold the newly hired journalists and shape their minds". Rachel Blevins, co-host of the business-finance show BoomBu$t, was recruited from college and while working for fringe websites and radio networks.

== Programming ==
- CrossTalk (2009–2022)
- Keiser Report (2009–2022)
- The Alyona Show (2009–2012)
- The Big Picture with Thom Hartmann (2010–2017)
- Larry King Now (2012–2020) (produced by Ora TV)
- Capital Account (2011–2013)
- Breaking the Set (2012–2015)
- Politicking with Larry King (2013–2020) (produced by Ora TV)
- Worlds Apart (2013–2022)
- Boom Bust with Bart Chilton (2013–2022)
- Going Underground with Afshin Rattansi (2013–2022)
- Redacted Tonight (2014–2022)
- America's Lawyer with Mike Papantonio (2016–2022)
- On Contact with Chris Hedges (2016–2022)
- News with Ed Schultz (2016–2018)
- The Alex Salmond Show (2017–2022)
- The World According to Jesse (2017-2022)
- Dennis Miller + One (2020–2022)
- KPFK Rebel Alliance radio podcast (2023–2024)

== Personalities ==
- Rick Sanchez Misha Solodovnikov Producer (2018–2022)
- Christy Ai (2019–2022)
- Chris Hedges Mikhail Johnson- Producer/editor (2016–2022)
- Max Keiser (2009–2022)
- Peter Lavelle (2009–2022)
- Stacy Herbert (2009–2022)
- Afshin Rattansi (2013–2022)
- Jesse Ventura (2015–2022)
- Sean Stone (2015–2022)
- Lee Camp (2014–2022)
- Mike Papantonio (2016–2022)
- Alex Salmond (2017–2022)
- Scottie Nell Hughes (2018–2022)
- Dennis Miller (2020–2022)
- Steve Malzberg (2020–2022)
- Ben Swann (2014–2015 and 2018–2022)
- Alyona Minkovski (2010–2012)
- Lauren Lyster (2010–2013)
- Larry King (2013–2020)
- Sophie Shevardnadze (2013–2022)
- Adam Kokesh (2011)
- Liz Wahl (2011–2014)
- Abby Martin (2012–2015)
- Ed Schultz (2016–2018)
- Thom Hartmann (2010–2017)

== Incidents ==
ODNI Statement on Declassified Intelligence Community Assessment of Russian Activities and Intentions in Recent U.S. Elections

=== Abby Martin statement ===
On March 4, 2014, Breaking the Set host Abby Martin, whose show was at the time produced by RT America, speaking directly to her viewing audience during the show's closing statement, said that although she worked for RT, she was against Russia's intervention in Ukraine. She said that "what Russia did is wrong," as she is against intervention by any nation into another country's affairs. Later, Martin asserted that RT still supported her despite her differences of opinion with the Russian government. RT's press office suggested that Martin would be sent to Crimea, and responded to accusations of propaganda, stating "the charges of propaganda tend to pop up every time a news outlet, particularly RT, dares to show the side of events that does not fit the mainstream narrative, regardless of the realities on the ground. This happened in Georgia, this is happening in Ukraine." (Note: See Information war during the Russo-Georgian war and annexation of Crimea by the Russian Federation.)

Glenn Greenwald said that American media elites love to mock Russian media, especially RT, as being a source of shameless pro-Putin propaganda, where free expression is strictly barred. Agreeing the "network has a strong pro-Russian bias", he suggested that Martin's action "remarkably demonstrated what 'journalistic independence' means".

=== Resignation of Liz Wahl ===
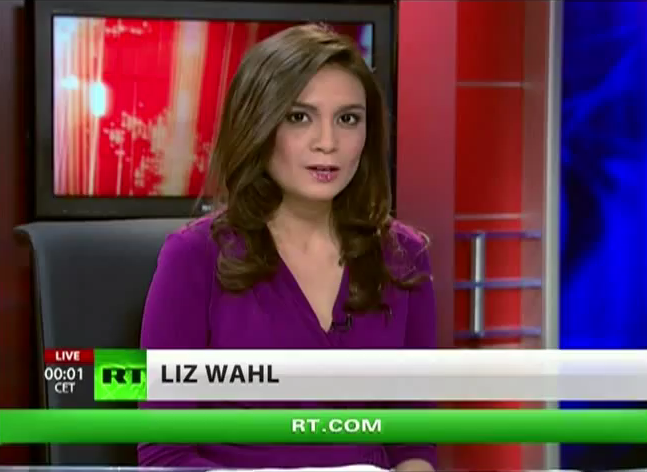
RT America broadcast with former anchor Liz Wahl

The day after Martin's statement, RT America anchor Liz Wahl resigned on air, which she said was due to her belief that RT was a propaganda machine for President Vladimir Putin. She stated:

I cannot be part of a network funded by the Russian government that whitewashes the actions of Putin. I am proud to be an American and believe in disseminating the truth. And that is why, after this newscast, I am resigning.

Wahl said that what "broke" her was that RT censored a question from her interview with Ron Paul about "Russia's intervention in Ukraine".

In response, RT released a statement: "When a journalist disagrees with the editorial position of his or her organization, the usual course of action is to address those grievances with the editor, and, if they cannot be resolved, to quit like a professional. But when someone makes a big public show of a personal decision, it is nothing more than a self-promotional stunt. We wish Liz the best of luck on her chosen path".

In a March 2014 Politico article, Wahl expanded on her resignation statement, saying, "For about two and a half years. I'd looked the other way as the network smeared America for the sake of making the Kremlin look better by comparison, while it sugarcoated atrocities by one brutal dictator after another."

When asked by Brian Stelter, host of CNN's Reliable Sources, about a clip of her interviewing a guest on RT, Wahl responded,

They get these extreme voices on that have this kind of hostile toward the West viewpoints towards the world, very extremist. These are the people that they have on. And when I was on the anchor desk, they would instruct you to egg on these guests and try to get them, you know, rallied up, to really fire off their anti-American talking points. Listen, I'm all about exposing government corruption. I'm all about being critical of the government. But this is different. This is promoting the foreign policy of somebody that has just invaded a country, has invaded the country and is then lying about it, is using the media as a tool to fulfill his foreign policy interests. And RT is part of Putin's propaganda network and it's very, very troubling in the wake of what is going on in Ukraine today.

=== C-SPAN interruption ===
On January 12, 2017, during a live House of Representatives debate on the Securities and Exchange Commission, C-SPAN 1's live broadcast was suddenly interrupted by a cut-in of RT America. C-SPAN explained the interruption as a technical malfunction, blaming it on an internal routing error, that moved the RT America feed from an internal monitor within C-SPAN used to monitor the network alongside others to the broadcast feed for C-SPAN 1.

RT stated that while it was testing its systems in preparation for the inauguration of Donald Trump, its signal was "mistakenly routed onto the primary encoder feeding C-SPAN 1's signal to the internet, rather than to an unused backup."

== See also ==
- Sputnik (news agency), RT's sister service which provides radio and web content
- United States cable news
- Voice of America, U.S. federal government's global service
- List of United States over-the-air television networks
- List of United States cable and satellite television networks
