= RT Arabic =

Arabic-language television news channel

- Country: Russia
- Broadcast area: Europe, Middle East, North Africa, Africa, South Asia, Asia Pacific, Australia, North America
- Network: RT
- Headquarters: Moscow

Programming
- Language: Arabic
- Picture format: 1080i HDTV (downscaled to 16:9 576i for the SDTV feed)

Ownership
- Owner: (ANO) TV-Novosti
- Sister channels: RT; RT Documentary; RT France; RT en español RT America (formerly); RT UK (formerly); RT India

History
- Launched: 4 May 2007

Links
- Website: arabic.rt.com

RT Arabic, formerly known as Rusiya Al-Yaum (Arabic: روسيا اليوم, lit. 'Russia Today'), is a Russian state-owned free-to-air television news channel broadcasting in Arabic and headquartered in Moscow, Russia. Rusiya Al-Yaum started broadcasting on 4 May 2007. The parent company of RT Arabic is TV-Novosti, which is an Autonomous Non-Commercial Organization owned by the Russian Federation.

The channel covers a wide variety of events worldwide from the point of view of the Russian government. It also features interviews, debates and stories about cultural life in Russia and major cities.

== History ==
“Rusiya Al-Yaum” was first conceived in February 2006 following the launch of its English counterpart RT in December 2005. Test broadcasts began on 4 May 2007, with a full launch being made later. By this point, it used satellites to broadcast across the Middle East, North Africa and Europe, with a potential audience of 350 million people. The channel can also be watched on the Internet. As of November 2012, it was available on myTV, an over-the-top technology platform in North and South America.

=== Editor-in-chief ===
Previously, when ANO TV-Novosti announced plans to launch an Arabic-language channel, the editor-in-chief's position was taken by Akram Khuzam, who had previously been Al Jazeera's former Moscow Bureau chief. He eventually decided to move back to Syria, leaving Margarita Simonyan, RT editor-in-chief, to be appointed as his successor. In her new post, Margarita Simonyan became responsible for the work of RT's English and Arabic channels. Aydar Aganin was appointed Deputy Editor-in-chief of the Arabic channel.

=== Demographics ===
The channel staff includes Russian and Arab journalists, Russian Arabists and Orientalists, overall having more than 500 employees including natives of Algeria, Egypt, Jordan, Iraq, Yemen, Lebanon, Mauritania, Morocco, Palestine, Syria, Sudan, Tunisia, Oman and other countries. The channel has correspondents in Lebanon, Palestine, Iraq, Egypt, Israel, Turkey, the United Kingdom and the United States. The channel also stated in 2007 that it planned to get its own exclusive materials from Syria, Jordan and Iraq in the near future.

== Programs ==
- Panorama—a weekly round-table discussion where various topics are covered. Each episode is 26 minutes in length and focuses on various topics and their aspects from different or sometimes controversial points of view.
- Persona—26-minute prime-time programme on Fridays - repeated on Saturdays and Sundays. The programme features guests with specific knowledge, experience and qualifications in political, cultural and other fields - at their workplace, at home, or any other place the guest chooses.
- Zoom—weekly edition covering current or unusual events, featuring public personalities or ordinary people in extraordinary situations. This is a dynamic 13-minute story during which events unfold in various locations - from the planet's hot-spots to science laboratories and theatres.
- Weekly Report—26-minute news and analysis programme that covers main political events over the previous seven days airing on Fridays and repeated on Saturdays and Sundays.
- Press Review—3-minute feature, four times a day, which covers headlines in Russian and foreign press, with special attention paid to Russian-Arab relations.
- Documentaries—RT Arabic presents a selection of documentaries centered on a variety of topics, including Russian culture and society.

== Assessment and reactions ==
RT Arabic, along with other RT channels, has been subject to criticism for its explicit connections with the Russian government. The parent company of RT, TV-Novosti, is registered as a state-owned ANO. According to figures from the Russian Ministry of Justice, TV-Novosti, the Russian state provides 176.7 billion rubles in financing and 42.3 million rubles in other funding.

On 9 November 2017, RT announced that it had been given a notice deadline to register under the U.S. Foreign Agents Registration Act (FARA) by the U.S. Justice Department. Although the U.S. Justice Department has never finalized the demand nor made it public, the action has generated a series of reactions from RT and the Russian government. Margarita Simonyan referred to this letter as a "cannibalistic deadline" and argued that this was an attempt to limit RT's functionalities. Top Russian officials have also reiterated their stand with RT on this matter, and have stated that a retaliation was likely to follow on U.S. foreign media.

== Incidents ==
On 17 May 2015, an RT Arabic journalist was allegedly assaulted by Israeli security forces while filming Jerusalem Day celebrations in Jerusalem. A similar occurrence took place on 9 December 2017.

On 29 January 2020, RT Arabic correspondent Wafa Shabruni was badly injured from an exploded shell during a militants' weapon depot removal in Idlib Governorate in Syria. She lost consciousness and was later taken to Hama State Hospital under the care of Russian military medics. RT editor-in-chief Margarita Simonyan personally thanked the medics and the Russian Minister of Defense for their assistance in this matter.

During the 2026 Iran war, RT Arabic's Iran bureau in Tehran was damaged following a U.S.-Israeli airstrike on a nearby building on 2 March.
