= Interdit d'interdire =

French television talk show

- Genre: Talk show
- Created by: Frédéric Taddeï
- Presented by: Frédéric Taddeï (former, resigned 23 February 2022)
- Theme music composer: Guillaume Perret
- Original language: French

Production
- Camera setup: Multiple
- Running time: 57 minutes

Original release
- Network: RT France
- Release: September 2018 – 23 February 2022

Interdit d'interdire was a live, daily (4 days per week), cultural, prime-time, talk show on RT France created by Frédéric Taddeï. Taddeï was the host of the show until his resignation on 23 February 2022 in response to Russia's recognition of the Donetsk and Luhansk breakaway states immediately before the 2022 Russian invasion of Ukraine. Following the beginning of the 2022 Russian invasion of Ukraine, RT was banned by the European Commission on all the territory of the European Union and RT France ceased activities on 21 January 2023.

The show was named after the aphorism Il est interdit d'interdire ! created by Jean Yanne and which became one of the popular slogans during May 1968.
