= Perth and Kinross-shire =

UK Parliament constituency (since 2024)

- County constituency for the House of Commons
- Interactive map of boundaries from 2024
- Boundary of Perth and Kinross-shire in Scotland
- Subdivision: Perth and Kinross
- Electorate: 76,320 (March 2020)
- Major settlements: Perth

Current constituency
- Created: 2024
- Member of Parliament: Pete Wishart (SNP)
- Seats: One
- Created from: Ochil and South Perthshire & Perth and North Perthshire

Perth and Kinross-shire is a constituency of the House of Commons in the UK Parliament. Further to the completion of the 2023 review of Westminster constituencies, it was first contested at the 2024 general election. The seat is currently held by the SNP's Pete Wishart who previously served as the MP for Perth and North Perthshire from 2005 to 2024 and North Tayside from 2001 to 2005.

== Boundaries ==
The constituency comprises the following wards or part wards of Perth and Kinross Council:

- In full: Almond and Earn, Kinross-shire, Strathearn, Carse of Gowrie, Perth City Centre, Perth City North, Perth City South.
- In part: Strathallan, Strathmore (area of Scone and District community council), Strathtay (minority of electorate including the villages of Dunning and Muthill).

The majority of the electorate, comprising the Carse of Gowrie, the city of Perth and surrounding villages, was previously part of the former Perth and North Perthshire constituency; areas to the west and south of Perth, including the towns of Crieff and Kinross, were transferred from the abolished constituency of Ochil and South Perthshire.

== Members of Parliament ==
Election	Member	Party
2024	Pete Wishart	SNP

== Elections ==
=== Elections in the 2020s ===
General election 2024: Perth and Kinross-shire
Party	Candidate	Votes	%	±%
SNP	Pete Wishart	18,928	37.8	−7.5
Conservative	Luke Graham	14,801	29.6	−11.5
Labour	Graham Cox	9,018	18.0	+13.0
Liberal Democrats	Amanda Clark	3,681	7.4	−0.6
Reform	Helen McDade	2,970	5.9	+5.2
Independent	Sally Hughes	679	1.4	N/A
Majority		4,127	8.2	
Turnout		50,077	64.8	
SNP hold		Swing	+2.0	

=== Elections in the 2010s ===
2019 notional result (Note: Estimate of the 2019 general election result as if the revised boundaries recommended under the 2023 boundary review were in place)
Party	Vote	%
SNP	25,562	45.3
Conservative	23,198	41.1
Liberal Democrats	4,505	8.0
Labour	2,818	5.0
Brexit Party	402	0.7
Majority	2,364	4.2
Turnout	56,485	74.0
Electorate	76,320	
