= Perth and Kinross Council elections =

Local government elections in Perth and Kinross, Scotland

Perth and Kinross Council in Scotland holds elections every five years, previously holding them every four years from its creation as a single-tier authority in 1995 to 2007.

== Council elections ==
=== As a district council ===
Year	SNP	Conservative	Liberal (Note: SDP–Liberal Alliance in 1984, Liberal Democrats from 1988 onwards.)	Labour	Independent
1974	0	16	0	4	9
1977	2	19	0	3	5
1980	1	19	1	5	3
1984 (Note: New ward boundaries.)	1	14	4	6	4
1988	8	12	2	5	2
1992	5	16	2	3	3

=== As a unitary authority ===
Year	SNP	Conservative	Liberal Democrats	Labour	Perth Independent Candidates Party	Independent
1995	18	2	5	6	0	1
1999 (Note: New ward boundaries.)	15	11	6	6	0	3
2003	15	10	9	5	0	2
2007 (Note: Change to single transferable vote system and new ward boundaries.)	18	12	8	3	0	0
2012	18	10	5	4	1	3
2017 (Note: New ward boundaries.)	15	17	4	1	0	3
2022	16	14	4	2	0	4

== Results maps ==
2017 results map

== By-elections ==
=== 2007-2012 ===
Highland By-Election 22 February 2008
Party	Candidate	FPv%	Count
Party	Candidate	FPv%	1
SNP	Katie Howie	59.9	1,891
Conservative	Graham Rees	29.8	940
Liberal Democrats	Andrew Kenton	7.3	229
Labour	Anne Chatt	3.1	97
SNP hold			
Valid: 3,157 Spoilt: 21 Quota: 1,579 Turnout: 3,178

Strathallan By-Election 6 May 2010
Party	Candidate	FPv%	Count				
Party	Candidate	FPv%	1	2	3	4	5
SNP	Tom Gray	30.3	1,555	1,569	1,769	2,299	3,302
Conservative	John Blackie	33.4	1,713	1,724	1,785	2,208	
Liberal Democrats	Neil Gaunt	20.3	1,042	1,057	1,321		
Labour	Alistair Munro	14.7	754	762			
Independent	Chris Rennie	1.2	61				
SNP hold							
Valid: 5,125 Spoilt: 54 Quota: 2,563.5 Turnout: 5,179

Highland By-Election 19 September 2011
Party	Candidate	FPv%	Count
Party	Candidate	FPv%	1
SNP	Mike Williamson	54.4	1,449
Conservative	Graham Rees	22.4	596
Liberal Democrats	Victor Clements	12.1	321
Independent	William Leske	10.1	269
Independent	Chris Rennie	1.0	27
SNP hold			
Valid: 2,662 Spoilt: 23 Quota: 1,332 Turnout: 2,685

=== 2012-2017 ===
Perth City Centre By-Election 7 May 2015
Party	Candidate	FPv%	Count
Party	Candidate	FPv%	1
SNP	Andrew Parrott	51.1	3,589
Conservative	Chris Ahern	23.9	1,679
Labour	Lorna Redford	13.4	939
Liberal Democrats	Philip Brown	10.0	701
Independent	Ian Thomson	1.7	119
SNP hold			
Valid: 7,027 Spoilt: 104 Quota: 3,515 Turnout: 7,131

Almond and Earn By-Election 7 April 2016
Party	Candidate	FPv%	Count		
Party	Candidate	FPv%	1	2	3
Conservative	Kathleen Baird	48.5	1,651	1,681	1,720
SNP	Wilma Lumsden	38.4	1,327	1,334	1,370
Labour	Dave MacKenzie	6.3	219	228	280
Liberal Democrats	George Hayton	4.5	157	163	
UKIP	Denise Baykal	2.2	77		
Conservative gain from Independent					
Valid: 3,431 Spoilt: 19 Quota: 1,716 Turnout: 3,450

=== 2017-2022 ===
Perth City South By-Election 23 November 2017
Party	Candidate	FPv%	Count					
Party	Candidate	FPv%	1	2	3	4	5	6
Conservative	Audrey Coates	31.2	1,734	1,738	1,744	1,762	2,381	2,863
SNP	Pauline Leitch	32.1	1,780	1,781	1,813	1,883	2,227	
Liberal Democrats	Liz Barrett	28.8	1,597	1,601	1,627	1,733		
Labour	Tricia Duncan	5.7	314	319	332			
Scottish Green	Elspeth MacLachlan	1.8	102	105	332			
Independent	Denise Baykal	0.5	25					
Conservative hold								
Valid: 5,552 Spoilt: 55 Quota: 2,777 Turnout: 5,607

Highland By-Election 19 April 2018
Party	Candidate	FPv%	Count					
Party	Candidate	FPv%	1	2	3	4	5	6
Conservative	John Duff	46.7	1,907	1,908	1,923	1,930	1,977	2,084
SNP	John Kellas	35.9	1,466	1,467	1,472	1,509	1,594	1,712
Independent	Avril Taylor	6.9	280	286	299	325	391	
Labour	Jayne Ramage	5.8	239	240	256	280		
Scottish Green	Mary McDougall	2.5	104	106	118			
Liberal Democrats	Chris Rennie	1.9	78	78				
Independent	Denise Baykal	0.3	12					
Conservative hold								
Valid: 4,086 Spoilt: 31 Quota: 2,044 Turnout: 4,117

Perth City North By-Election 26 November 2020
Party	Candidate	FPv%	Count
Party	Candidate	FPv%	1
SNP	Ian Massie	61.0	1,406
Conservative	Aziz Rehman	22.9	528
Labour	Nicola Ferry	9.5	220
Liberal Democrats	James Graham	3.9	91
Scottish Green	Paul Vallot	2.6	60
SNP hold			
Valid: 2,305 Spoilt: 28 Quota: 1,153 Turnout: 2,333

Perth City South By-Election 26 November 2020
Party	Candidate	FPv%	Count					
Party	Candidate	FPv%	1	2	3	4	5	6
Liberal Democrats	Liz Barrett	31.6	1,823	1,824	1,851	1,925	2,749	3,571
SNP	Iain MacPherson	32.9	1,898	1,900	1,960	2,017	2,110	
Conservative	Andy Chan	29.4	1,698	1,705	1,713	1,729		
Labour	Tricia Duncan	3.5	204	205	224			
Scottish Green	Elspeth MacLachlan	2.3	135	136				
UKIP	Lynda Davis	0.3	18					
Liberal Democrats gain from SNP								
Valid: 5,776 Spoilt: 51 Quota: 2,889 Turnout: 5,827

Almond and Earn By-Election 25 March 2021
Party	Candidate	FPv%	Count
Party	Candidate	FPv%	1
Conservative	Frank Smith	51.2	1,819
SNP	Michelle Frampton	37.3	1,327
Labour	Craig Masson	7.5	267
Liberal Democrats	Claire McLaren	4.0	143
Conservative gain from SNP			
Valid: 3,556 Spoilt: 17 Quota: 1,779 Turnout: 3,573

=== 2022-2027 ===
Perth City North By-Election 26 September 2024
Party	Candidate	FPv%	Count				
Party	Candidate	FPv%	1	2	3	4	5
SNP	Carol Mair	44.7	917	946	961	1,015	1,058
Labour	Kirsten Nkwocha-Dyer	15.3	313	331	358	374	409
Conservative	Aziz Rehman	14.4	296	297	316	323	365
Reform UK	Sonia Davidson	10.2	209	213	220	234	
Alba	Robert Reid	6.5	133	139	145		
Liberal Democrats	Tina Ng-a-Mann	4.6	95	111			
Scottish Green	Caitlin Ripley	4.2	87				
SNP gain from Labour							
Valid: 2,050 Spoilt: 21 Quota: 1,026 Turnout: 2,071

Strathallan By-Election 26 September 2024
Party	Candidate	FPv%	Count					
Party	Candidate	FPv%	1	2	3	4	5	6
Liberal Democrats	Alan Watt	30.0	978	1,006	1,035	1,213	1,509	2,110
Conservative	Amanda Runciman	32.1	1,045	1,049	1,123	1,169	1,206	
SNP	Catherine Scott	17.4	568	613	626	696		
Labour	Ken McCracken	11.2	366	382	388			
Reform UK	Ian Thomas	6.0	194	198				
Scottish Green	Nettie Sutherland	3.3	107					
Liberal Democrats gain from Conservative								
Valid: 3,258 Spoilt: 22 Quota: 1,630 Turnout: 3,280
