= Blairgowrie and Glens (ward) =

Electoral ward of Perth and Kinross, Scotland

Location of the ward

Blairgowrie and Glens is one of the twelve wards used to elect members of the Perth and Kinross Council. It elects three Councillors.

== Councillors ==
Election	Councillors		
2007	Bob Ellis (SNP)	Liz Grant (SNP)	Caroline Shiers (Conservative)
2012	Bob Ellis (SNP)	Liz Grant (SNP)	Caroline Shiers (Conservative)
2017	Tom McEwan (SNP)	Bob Brawn (Conservative)	Caroline Shiers (Conservative)
2022	Tom McEwan (SNP)	Bob Brawn (Conservative)	Caroline Shiers (Conservative)

== Election results ==
=== 2022 Election ===
2022 Perth and Kinross Council election

Blairgowrie & Glens - 3 seats
Party	Candidate	FPv%	Count								
Party	Candidate	FPv%	1	2	3	4	5	6	7	8	9
Conservative	Caroline Shiers (incumbent)	25.78%	1,202								
SNP	Tom McEwen (incumbent)	23.62%	1,101	1,102.05	1,105.05	1,111.08	1,119.14	1,194.2			
Conservative	Bob Brawn (incumbent)	19.69%	918	949.24	961.36	974.45	1,008.84	1,023.9	1,024.54	1,089.69	1,244.5
SNP	Harry Macfadyen	16.65%	776	776.33	778.33	780.33	785.36	811.39	835.72	889.02	
Labour	Pauline Hunter	4.98%	232	232.42	234.42	241.42	300.66	341.69	342.57		
Green	Louise Ramsay	3.62%	169	169.33	175.33	187.39	214.48				
Liberal Democrats	Gordon Clark	3.5%	163	164.02	168.02	178.02					
Independent	Bernard Noonan	1.37%	64	64.27	65.27						
Scottish Family	Jack Murphy	0.79%	37	37.18							
Electorate: 9,188 Valid: 4,662 Quota: 1,166 Turnout: 52.2%

=== 2017 Election ===
2017 Perth and Kinross Council election

Blairgowrie and Glens - 3 seats
Party	Candidate	FPv%	Count				
Party	Candidate	FPv%	1	2	3	4	5
Conservative	Caroline Shiers (incumbent)	36.4	1,641				
SNP	Tom McEwan	23.4	1,055	1,067.8	1,074.1	1,099.2	1,154.3
Conservative	Bob Brawn	19.9	897	1,341.5			
SNP	Alison Mulholland	13.5	609	616.8	621.7	658.5	682.3
Green	Louise Ramsay	3.6	164	171.8	188.2		
Liberal Democrats	Gordon Clark	3.1	141	156.7	224.3	297.5	
Electorate: 8,607 Valid: 4,507 Spoilt: 138 Quota: 1,127 Turnout: 4,645 (53.6%)

=== 2012 Election ===
2012 Perth and Kinross Council election

Blairgowrie and Glens - 3 seats
Party	Candidate	FPv%	Count	
Party	Candidate	FPv%	1	2
SNP	Bob Ellis (incumbent)	34.11%	1,340	
Conservative	Caroline Shiers (incumbent)	33.49%	1,316	
SNP	Liz Grant (incumbent)	21.48%	844	1,152
Labour	Grant Wallace	8.20%	322	333
Liberal Democrats	Sanjay Samani	2.72%	107	114
Electorate: - Valid: 3,929 Spoilt: 66 Quota: 983 Turnout: 3,995 (%)

=== 2007 Election ===
2007 Perth and Kinross Council election

Perth and Kinross council election, 2007: Blairgowrie and Glens
Party	Candidate	FPv%	Count	
Party	Candidate	FPv%	1	2
SNP	Bob Ellis	33.8	1,680	
Conservative	Caroline Shiers	28.9	1,435	
SNP	Liz Grant	20.9	1,038	1,379
Liberal Democrats	Alison Taylor	9.2	459	487
Labour	Roy Cameron	7.2	357	371
Electorate: 8,319 Valid: 4,969 Spoilt: 112 Quota: 1,243 Turnout: 61.08%
