= Carse of Gowrie (ward) =

Electoral ward in Scotland

Location of the ward

Carse of Gowrie is one of the twelve wards used to elect members of the Perth and Kinross Council. It elects three Councillors.

== Councillors ==
Election	Councillors		
2007	Peter Mulheron (SNP)	John Hulbert (SNP)	Mac Roberts (Conservative)
2012	Gordon Walker (SNP)	Douglas Pover (SNP)	Mac Roberts (Conservative)
2017	Beth Pover (SNP)	Alasdair Bailey (Labour)	Angus Forbes (Conservative)
2022	Ken Harvey (SNP)	Alasdair Bailey (Labour)	Angus Forbes (Conservative)

== Election results ==
=== 2022 Election ===
2022 Perth and Kinross Council election

Carse of Gowrie - 3 seats
Party	Candidate	FPv%	Count							
Party	Candidate	FPv%	1	2	3	4	5	6	7	8
Labour	Alasdair Bailey (incumbent)	27.8%	1,265							
Conservative	Angus Forbes (incumbent)	22.4%	1,017	1,041.4	1,054.7	1,099.1	1,139.4			
SNP	Ken Harvey	21.1%	961	980.5	983.6	996.4	1,100.3	1,100.4	1,134.1	1,652.8
SNP	John Kellas	10.4%	474	479.7	483.7	493.9	544.4	544.4	567.0	
Conservative	Mac Roberts	8.5%	388	396.5	405.7	429.4	446.9	448.9		
Scottish Green	Roger Humphry	5.1%	233	251.7	260.0	306.6				
Liberal Democrats	Lindsay Easton	3.3%	150	176.4	182.7					
Scottish Family	Don Marshall	1.3%	59	60.7						
Electorate: 8,157 Valid: 4,619 Spoilt: 72 Quota: 1,137 Turnout: 56.6%

=== 2017 Election ===
2017 Perth and Kinross Council election

Carse of Gowrie - 3 seats
Party	Candidate	FPv%	Count					
Party	Candidate	FPv%	1	2	3	4	5	6
Conservative	Angus Forbes	43.4	1,916					
SNP	Beth Pover	18.3	810	829.9	884.01	910.09	910.6	1,579.08
SNP	Douglas Pover (incumbent)	15.1	668	681.1	692.1	715.6	715.8	
Labour	Alasdair Bailey	14.8	656	825.7	875.8	1,107.3		
Liberal Democrats	Mary Matheson	4.6	203	423.9	482.4			
Scottish Green	Hilary Charles	3.7	165	209				
Electorate: 7,830 Valid: 4,418 Spoilt: 70 Quota: 1,105 Turnout: 4,488 (57.3%)

=== 2012 Election ===
2012 Perth and Kinross Council election

Carse of Gowrie - 3 seats
Party	Candidate	FPv%	Count			
Party	Candidate	FPv%	1	2	3	4
Conservative	Mac Roberts (incumbent)	32.45%	1,045			
SNP	Gordon Walker	23.45%	755	778	801	928
SNP	Douglas Pover	23.32%	751	769	796	925
Labour	Lorna Redford	15.31%	493	527	639	
Liberal Democrats	Tina Ng-A-Mann	5.47%	176	247		
Electorate: - Valid: 3,220 Spoilt: 47 Quota: 806 Turnout: 3,267 (%)

=== 2007 Election ===
2007 Perth and Kinross Council election

Perth and Kinross council election, 2007: Carse of Gowrie
Party	Candidate	FPv%	Count				
Party	Candidate	FPv%	1	2	3	4	5
Conservative	Mac Roberts	28.6	1,192				
SNP	John Hulbert	25.8	1,075				
SNP	Peter Mulheron	20.7	862	882	905	975	1,353
Liberal Democrats	Catherine Carruthers	17.2	715	757	759	917	
Independent	Richard Rattray	7.8	323	355	356		
Electorate: 6,775 Valid: 4,167 Spoilt: 80 Quota: 1,042 Turnout: 62.69%
