= 2017 Perth and Kinross Council election =

2017 Scottish local government election

← 2012	4 May 2017	2022 →

All 40 seats to Perth and Kinross Council 21 seats needed for a majority
	First party	Second party	Third party
Party	Conservative	SNP	Liberal Democrats
Last election	10 seats, 25.2%	18 seats, 40.3%	5 seats, 12.7%
Seats before	10	18	5
Seats won	17	15	4
Seat change	▲7	▼3	▼1
Popular vote	24,761	18,871	7,539
Percentage	40.9%	31.2%	12.5%
Swing	▲15.7%	▼9.2%	▼0.2%
	Fourth party	Fifth party
Party	Independent	Labour
Last election	3 seats, 7.3%	4 seats, 11.9%
Seats before	3	4
Seats won	3	1
Seat change	Steady	▼3
Popular vote	4,083	3,142
Percentage	6.7%	5.2%
Swing	▼0.6%	▼6.7%
- The 12 multi-member wards
Council Leader before election
Ian Miller
SNP
Council Leader after election
Ian Campbell
Conservative

The 2017 Perth and Kinross Council election was held on 4 May 2017, the same day as the other Scottish local government elections. The election covered the twelve wards created as a result of the Local Governance (Scotland) Act 2004, with each ward electing three or four councillors using the single transferable vote system form of proportional representation, with 40 Councillors being elected, a reduction of 1 member compared to 2012.

Following the 2012 election a Scottish National Party minority administration took over the running of the Council with the support of the Scottish Conservatives. After this election, the Conservatives and Liberal Democrat groups formed a coalition with independents to run the administration. The sole Labour councillor, Alasdair Bailey, was initially named as part of the coalition, but soon insisted that he was not.

In September 2019, the coalition ended as the Conservative group voted to continue in a minority administration.

== Results ==
2017 Perth and Kinross Council election result
Party	Seats	Gains	Losses	Net gain/loss	Seats %	Votes %	Votes	+/−
Conservative	17	-	-	▲7	42.5	40.9	24,761	▲15.7
SNP	15	-	-	▼3	37.5	31.2	18,871	▼9.2
Liberal Democrats	4	-	-	▼1	10.0	12.5	7,539	▼0.2
Labour	1	-	-	▼3	2.5	5.2	3,142	▼6.7
Independent	3	-	-	Steady	7.5	6.7	4,083	▼0.6
Green	0	-	-	Steady	0.0	3.4	2,083	▲2.5
Scotland Independent Network	0	-	-	Steady	0.0	0.1	78	▼0.8

Note: "Votes" are the first preference votes. The net gain/loss and percentage changes relate to the result of the previous Scottish local elections on 3 May 2012. This may differ from other published sources showing gain/loss relative to seats held at dissolution of Scotland's councils. There was also one less seat at this election than in 2012.

== Ward results ==
=== Carse of Gowrie ===
- 2012: 2xSNP; 1xCon
- 2017: 1xSNP; 1xCon; 1xLab
- 2012-2017 Change:1xLab Gain from SNP

Carse of Gowrie - 3 seats
Party	Candidate	FPv%	Count					
Party	Candidate	FPv%	1	2	3	4	5	6
Conservative	Angus Forbes	43.4	1,916					
SNP	Beth Pover	18.3	810	829.9	884.01	910.09	910.6	1,579.08
SNP	Douglas Pover (incumbent)	15.1	668	681.1	692.1	715.6	715.8	
Labour	Alasdair Bailey	14.8	656	825.7	875.8	1,107.3		
Liberal Democrats	Mary Matheson	4.6	203	423.9	482.4			
Green	Hilary Charles	3.7	165	209				
Electorate: 7,830 Valid: 4,418 Spoilt: 70 Quota: 1,105 Turnout: 4,488 (57.3%)

=== Strathmore ===
- 2012: 2xSNP; 1xCon; 1xLib Dem
- 2017: 2xCon; 1xSNP; 1xLib Dem
- 2012-2017 Change: 1xCon Gain from SNP

Strathmore - 4 seats
Party	Candidate	FPv%	Count					
Party	Candidate	FPv%	1	2	3	4	5	6
Conservative	Dennis Melloy (incumbent)	26.7	1,833					
Liberal Democrats	Lewis Simpson (incumbent)	19.5	1,342	1,365.7	1,379.6			
SNP	Fiona Sarwar	18.2	1,251	1,266.9	1,267.8	1,267.9	1,355.9	1,417.8
Conservative	Colin Stewart	15.2	1,047	1,418.9				
SNP	Ian Stratton	12.6	866	868.7	869.1	869.5	899.2	940.8
Independent	Alan Livingstone *	3.9	270	277.2	282.2	283.4	358.08	
Green	Michael Gallagher	3.9	268	274.7	276.8	277.4		
Electorate: Valid: 6,877 Spoilt: 165 Quota: 1,376 Turnout: 7,042 (57.9%)

- = Sitting Councillor from Almond and Earn Ward.

=== Blairgowrie and Glens ===
- 2012: 2xSNP; 1xCon
- 2017: 2xCon; 1xSNP
- 2012-2017 Change: 1xCon Gain from SNP

Blairgowrie and Glens - 3 seats
Party	Candidate	FPv%	Count				
Party	Candidate	FPv%	1	2	3	4	5
Conservative	Caroline Shiers (incumbent)	36.4	1,641				
SNP	Tom McEwan	23.4	1,055	1,067.8	1,074.1	1,099.2	1,154.3
Conservative	Bob Brawn	19.9	897	1,341.5			
SNP	Alison Mulholland	13.5	609	616.8	621.7	658.5	682.3
Green	Louise Ramsay	3.6	164	171.8	188.2		
Liberal Democrats	Gordon Clark	3.1	141	156.7	224.3	297.5	
Electorate: 8,607 Valid: 4,507 Spoilt: 138 Quota: 1,127 Turnout: 4,645 (53.6%)

=== Highland ===
- 2012: 2xSNP; 1xCon
- 2017: 1xCon; 1xSNP; 1xIND
- 2012-2017 Change: 1xIND gain from SNP

Highland - 3 seats
Party	Candidate	FPv%	Count				
Party	Candidate	FPv%	1	2	3	4	5
Conservative	Ian Campbell (incumbent)††	45.44	1,927				
SNP	Mike Williamson (incumbent)	19.22	815	843.76	877.11	911.6	1,578.94
SNP	Kirsty Gowans	17.31	734	757.82	791.27	822.21	
Independent	Xander McDade	10.59	449	716.39	770.28	953.5	1,024.24
Green	Mary McDougall	3.96	168	200.81			
Liberal Democrats	Kenneth Spittal	3.49	148	332.71	385.39		
Electorate: TBC Valid: 4,241 Spoilt: 65 Quota: 1,061 Turnout: 4,306 (58.4%)

=== Strathtay ===
- 2012: 2xSNP; 1xCon
- 2017: 2xCon; 1xSNP
- 2012-2017 Change: 1xCon Gain from SNP

Strathtay - 3 seats
Party	Candidate	FPv%	Count					
Party	Candidate	FPv%	1	2	3	4	5	6
Conservative	Anne Jarvis	25.28	1,307					
Conservative	Ian James	19.63	1,015	1,027.68	1,066.73	1,090.78	1,222.92	1,236.93
SNP	Grant Laing (incumbent)	19.52	1,009	1,009.15	1,033.15	1,094.15	1,164.17	2,133.22
SNP	John Kellas (incumbent)	18.28	945	945.13	955.13	1,018.13	1,112.13	
Labour	Frank Stevenson	8.96	463	463.28	510.32	593.34		
Green	Elspeth Coutts	4.24	219	219.12	277.16			
Liberal Democrats	Alex Linklater	4.1	212	212.18				
Electorate: TBC Valid: 5,170 Spoilt: 81 Quota: 1,293 Turnout: 5,251 (57.6%)

=== Strathearn ===
- 2012: 1xSNP; 1xCon; 1xPICP
- 2017: 1xSNP; 1xCon; 1xPICP
- 2012-2017 Change: No Change

Strathearn - 3 seats
Party	Candidate	FPv%	Count						
Party	Candidate	FPv%	1	2	3	4	5	6	7
Conservative	Roz McCall	26.54	1,204						
Independent	Rhona Brock (incumbent)	24.51	1,112	1,115.72	1,144.78				
SNP	Stewart Donaldson	13.34	605	605.11	608.11	609.08	681.3	715.67	1,204.12
Conservative	Alex Menzies-Runciman	13.01	590	651.37	670.43	672.64	686.92	764.31	769.32
SNP	John Fellows	10.6	481	481	485	485.55	513.66	537.82	
Independent	Craig Finlay	6.06	275	275.86	279.92	283.26	317.53		
Green	Lawrence Buckley	4.12	187	187.29	199.34	200.38			
Liberal Democrats	Tina Ng-A-Mann	1.81	82	82.29					
Electorate: TBC Valid: 4,536 Spoilt: 121 Quota: 1,135 Turnout: 4,656 (54.4%)

=== Strathallan ===
- 2012: 1xCon; 1xSNP; 1xLib Dem
- 2017: 2xCon; 1xSNP
- 2012-2017 Change: 1xCon gain from Lib Dem

Strathallan - 3 seats
Party	Candidate	FPv%	Count						
Party	Candidate	FPv%	1	2	3	4	5	6	7
Conservative	Murray Lyle (incumbent)	28.05	1,280						
Conservative	Crawford Reid	23.64	1,079	1,195.76					
SNP	Tom Gray (incumbent)	14.61	667	669.37	670.14	673.14	705.19	736.49	1,279.99
SNP	Mairi MacDonald	12.66	578	579.29	580.0	581	616.26	631.26	
Liberal Democrats	Ann Gaunt (incumbent)	11.79	538	546.52	563.61	565.76	628.41	752.12	788.79
Labour	Fhinan Beyts	5.15	235	235.97	239.95	243.33	266.7		
Green	Bruce Fummey	3.7	169	169.75	171.72	175.92			
Independent	Ron Rose	0.39	18	18.86	22.27				
Electorate: TBC Valid: 4,564 Spoilt: 78 Quota: 1,142 Turnout: 4,642 (54.5%)

=== Kinross-shire ===
- 2012: 2xIndependent; 1xLib Dem; 1xSNP
- 2017: 1xCon; 1xSNP; 1xLib Dem; 1xIND
- 2012-2017 Change:1xCon gain from IND

Kinross-shire - 4 seats
Party	Candidate	FPv%	Count						
Party	Candidate	FPv%	1	2	3	4	5	6	7
Conservative	Callum Purves	26.73	1,642						
SNP	Richard Watters	19.03	1,169	1,171.77	1,224.77	1,253.02			
Liberal Democrats	Willie Robertson (incumbent)	17.29	1,062	1,104.51	1,128.76	1,235.76			
Independent	Mike Barnacle (incumbent) ††††††	12.16	747	759.07	777.07	807.07	813.07	814.7	1,272.92
Independent	Dave Cuthbert (incumbent)	9.77	600	618.86	637.12	689.37	695.79	698.03	
Conservative	John Ross	7.96	489	803.91	807.15	831.18	832.08	833.3	907.43
Labour	David MacKenzie	4.77	293	299.04	311.04				
Green	Karen Grunwell	2.31	142	143					
Electorate: TBC Valid: 6,144 Spoilt: 59 Quota: 1,229 Turnout: 6,203 (58.3%)

=== Almond and Earn ===
- 2012: 1xCon; 1xSNP; 1xIndependent
- 2017: 2xCon; 1xSNP
- 2012-2017 Change: 1xCon gain from IND

Almond and Earn - 3 seats
Party	Candidate	FPv%	Count				
Party	Candidate	FPv%	1	2	3	4	5
Conservative	Kathleen Baird (incumbent)	42.08	1,724				
SNP	Henry Anderson (incumbent)†††††	21.53	882	899.84	905.35	972.91	1,312.13
Conservative	David Illingworth	17.5	717	1,324.36			
SNP	Peter Glennie	8.05	330	332.43	335.48	379.6	
Liberal Democrats	Chris Rennie	5.61	230	253.52	344.1	435.66	445.7
Green	Linda Buchan	5.22	214	232.25	254.07		
Electorate: TBC Valid: 4,097 Spoilt: 113 Quota: 1,025 Turnout: 4,210 (55.2%)

=== Perth City South ===
- 2012: 1xLib Dem; 1xCon; 1xSNP; 1xLab
- 2017: 1xLib Dem; 1xCon; 2xSNP;
- 2012-2017 Change: 1xSNP gain from Lab

Perth City South - 4 seats
Party	Candidate	FPv%	Count						
Party	Candidate	FPv%	1	2	3	4	5	6	7
Liberal Democrats	William Wilson (incumbent)	34.66	2,417						
Conservative	Michael Jamieson†	25.2	1,757						
SNP	Bob Band (incumbent) ††††	14.9	1,039	1,151.05	1,158.26	1,169.32	1,226.72	1,267.05	1,381.62
SNP	Sheila McCole	10.81	754	828.42	831.92	837.24	904.96	944.39	1,083.36
Labour	Alistair Munro (incumbent)	6.37	444	615.25	678.5	702.63	780.71	902.22	
Independent	Susan Bathgate	3.63	253	417.9	471.68	560.41	600.75		
Green	Paul Vallot	3.05	213	306.45	322.72	337.21			
Independent	Damian Houston	1.38	96	176.34	211.16				
Electorate: TBC Valid: 6,973 Spoilt: 113 Quota: 1,395 Turnout: 7,086 (55%)

=== Perth City North ===
- 2012: 2xSNP; 2xLab
- 2017: 2xSNP; 1xCon
- 2012-2017 Change: 1xCon gain from Lab

Perth City North - 3 seats
Party	Candidate	FPv%	Count							
Party	Candidate	FPv%	1	2	3	4	5	6	7	8
SNP	Dave Doogan (incumbent) †††	35.37	1,290							
Conservative	Harry Coates	25.58	933							
Labour	Calum Gillies (incumbent)	15.82	577	596.34	601.15	606.47	619.92	674.5	722.49	
SNP	John Rebbeck	13.16	480	797.63	798.15	799.44	817.98	836.76	870.49	1,047.4
Liberal Democrats	Philip Brown	3.45	126	131.86	135.71	137.73	141.91			
Independent	Elspeth MacLachlan (incumbent)*	3.1	113	118.57	120.01	124.05	188.88	213.64		
Independent	Sam Finlayson	2.5	91	97.45	99.45	119.88				
Independent	Arthur Frater	1.01	37	38.17	38.53					
Electorate: TBC Valid: 3,647 Spoilt: 108 Quota: 912 Turnout: 3,755 (41.1%)

*served as councillor for the SNP in previous term

=== Perth City Centre ===
- 2012: 1xSNP; 1xLib Dem; 1xLab; 1xCon
- 2017: 1xCon; 2xSNP; 1xLib Dem
- 2012-2017 Change: 1xSNP gain from Lab

Perth City Centre - 4 seats
Party	Candidate	FPv%	Count							
Party	Candidate	FPv%	1	2	3	4	5	6	7	8
Conservative	Chris Ahern	32.75	1,763							
SNP	Eric Drysdale	19.99	1,076	1,091.17						
Liberal Democrats	Peter Barrett (incumbent)	19.28	1,038	1,313.87						
SNP	Andrew Parrott (incumbent)	14.08	758	763.06	780.22	792.2	792.21	809.79	895.96	1,086.4
Labour	Tricia Duncan	8.81	474	554.93	627.55	628.32	633.9	668.24	739.77	
Green	Fraser Hunter	3.23	174	191.51	218.62	219.19	225.54	250.69		
Scotland Independent Network	Ian Thomson	1.45	78	132.08	152.44	152.56	173.49			
Independent	David West	0.41	22	44.57	54.84	54.87				
Electorate: TBC Valid: 5,383 Spoilt: 129 Quota: 1,077 Turnout: 5,512 (44.7%)

== Aftermath ==
On 29 March 2021 Kinross-shire councillor Mike Barnacle joined the Conservative group.

=== By-elections ===
==== Perth City South by-election (2017) ====
On 25 September 2017, Perth City South Conservative councillor Michael Jamieson resigned his seat having been found to be in possession of indecent images. A by-election took place on 23 November 2017. The seat was won by the Conservative candidate, Audrey Coates.

Perth City South by-election (23 November 2017) - 1 seat
Party	Candidate	FPv%	Count					
Party	Candidate	FPv%	1	2	3	4	5	6
SNP	Pauline Leitch	32.1	1,780	1,781	1,813	1,883	2,227	
Conservative	Audrey Coates	31.2	1,734	1,738	1,744	1,762	2,381	2,863
Liberal Democrats	Liz Barrett	28.8	1,597	1,601	1,627	1,733		
Labour	Tricia Duncan	5.7	314	319	332			
Green	Elspeth MacLachlan	1.8	102	105	332			
Independent	Denise Baykal	0.5	25					
Electorate: 12,998 Valid: 5,552 Spoilt: 55 Quota: 2,777 Turnout: 43.1%

==== Highland by-election ====
On 6 February 2018 Highland Conservative councillor Ian Campbell died suddenly. A by-election was held on 19 April 2018 and was won by the Conservative candidate John Duff.

Highland by-election (19 April 2018) - 1 seat
Party	Candidate	FPv%	Count					
Party	Candidate	FPv%	1	2	3	4	5	6
Conservative	John Duff	46.7	1,907	1,908	1,923	1,930	1,977	2,084
SNP	John Kellas	35.9	1,466	1,467	1,472	1,509	1,594	1,712
Independent	Avril Taylor	6.9	280	286	299	325	391	
Labour	Jayne Ramage	5.8	239	240	256	280		
Green	Mary McDougall	2.5	104	106	118			
Liberal Democrats	Chris Rennie	1.9	78	78				
Independent	Denise Baykal	0.3	12					
Electorate: 7,333 Valid: 4,086 Spoilt: 31 Quota: 2,044 Turnout: 56.2%

==== Perth City South by-election (2020) ====
On 26 March 2020 Perth City South SNP councillor Bob Band died after a long battle with cancer. A by-election was held on 26 November 2020 and won by the Liberal Democrat candidate Liz Barrett.

Perth City South by-election (26 November 2020) - 1 seat
Party	Candidate	FPv%	Count					
Party	Candidate	FPv%	1	2	3	4	5	6
SNP	Iain MacPherson	32.9	1,898	1,900	1,960	2,017	2,110	
Liberal Democrats	Liz Barrett	31.6	1,823	1,824	1,851	1,925	2,749	3,571
Conservative	Andy Chan	29.4	1,698	1,705	1,713	1,729		
Labour	Tricia Duncan	3.5	204	205	224			
Green	Elspeth MacLachlan	2.3	135	136				
UKIP	Lynda Davis	0.3	18					
Turnout: 44.0%

==== Perth City North by-election ====
On 19 February 2020 Perth City North SNP councillor Dave Doogan resigned his seat having been elected as an MP for Angus at the 2019 UK Parliament Election. A by-election was held on 26 November 2020 and won by the SNP candidate Ian Massie.

Perth City North by-election (26 November 2020) - 1 seat
Party	Candidate	FPv%	Count
Party	Candidate	FPv%	1
SNP	Ian Massie	61.0	1,406
Conservative	Aziz Rehman	22.9	528
Labour	Nicola Ferry	9.5	220
Liberal Democrats	James Graham	3.9	91
Green	Paul Vallot	2.6	60
Turnout: 25.5%

==== Almond and Earn by-election ====
On 27 December 2020 Almond and Earn SNP councillor Henry Anderson died having contacted Coronavirus. A by-election was held on 25 March 2021 and won by the Conservative candidate Frank Smith.

Almond and Earn by-election (25 March 2021) - 1 seat
Party	Candidate	FPv%	Count
Party	Candidate	FPv%	1
Conservative	Frank Smith	51.2	1,819
SNP	Michelle Frampton	37.3	1,327
Labour	Craig Masson	7.5	267
Liberal Democrats	Claire McLaren	4.0	143
Electorate: TBC Valid: 3,556 Spoilt: 17 Turnout: 3,573
