= Strathearn (ward) =

Electoral ward of Perth and Kinross, Scotland

Location of the ward

Strathearn is one of the twelve wards used to elect members of the Perth and Kinross Council. It elects three Councillors.

== Councillors ==
Election	Councillors		
2007	Anne Younger (SNP)	Anne Cowan (Conservative)	Helen McDonald (Conservative)
2012	Anne Younger (SNP)	Anne Cowan (Conservative)	Rhona Black (Perth Ind.)
2017	Stewart Donaldson (SNP)	Roz McCall (Conservative)	Rhona Black (Perth Ind.)
2022	Stewart Donaldson (SNP)	Noah Khogali (Conservative)	Rhona Black (Perth Ind.)

== Election results ==
=== 2022 Election ===
2022 Perth and Kinross Council election

Strathearn - 3 seats
Party	Candidate	FPv%	Count			
Party	Candidate	FPv%	1	2	3	4
Conservative	Noah Khogali	29.94%	1,337			
Independent	Rhona Brock (incumbent)	27.41%	1,224			
SNP	Stewart Donaldson (incumbent)	24.23%	1,082	1,086.77	1,104.95	1,137.27
SNP	David West	8.76%	391	393.14	396.72	402.83
Liberal Democrats	Julia Brown	5.84%	261	327.47	354.92	452.71
Independent	Roger Cartwright	3.83%	171	237.97	276.17	
Electorate: 8,672 Valid: 4,466 Quota: 1,117 Turnout: 52.4%

=== 2017 Election ===
2017 Perth and Kinross Council election

Strathearn - 3 seats
Party	Candidate	FPv%	Count						
Party	Candidate	FPv%	1	2	3	4	5	6	7
Conservative	Roz McCall	26.54	1,204						
Independent	Rhona Brock (incumbent)	24.51	1,112	1,115.72	1,144.78				
SNP	Stewart Donaldson	13.34	605	605.11	608.11	609.08	681.3	715.67	1,204.12
Conservative	Alex Menzies-Runciman	13.01	590	651.37	670.43	672.64	686.92	764.31	769.32
SNP	John Fellows	10.6	481	481	485	485.55	513.66	537.82	
Independent	Craig Finlay	6.06	275	275.86	279.92	283.26	317.53		
Green	Lawrence Buckley	4.12	187	187.29	199.34	200.38			
Liberal Democrats	Tina Ng-A-Mann	1.81	82	82.29					
Electorate: TBC Valid: 4,536 Spoilt: 121 Quota: 1,135 Turnout: 4,656 (54.4%)

=== 2012 Election ===
2012 Perth and Kinross Council election

Strathearn - 3 seats
Party	Candidate	FPv%	Count			
Party	Candidate	FPv%	1	2	3	4
SNP	Anne Younger (incumbent)	30.82%	1,137			
Conservative	Ann Cowan (incumbent)	23.69%	874	889	910	946
Perth Independent Candidates Party	Rhona Brock	18.27%	674	742	779	939
Conservative	Bob Ferguson	15.59%	575	588	599	640
Labour	Alastair McLean	8.76%	323	356	389	
Liberal Democrats	Kenneth Robertson Spittal	2.87%	106	125		
Electorate: - Valid: 3,689 Spoilt: 30 Quota: 923 Turnout: 3,719 (%)

=== 2007 Election ===
2007 Perth and Kinross Council election

Perth and Kinross council election, 2007: Strathearn
Party	Candidate	FPv%	Count					
Party	Candidate	FPv%	1	2	3	4	5	6
SNP	Anne Younger	25.18	1,210					
Conservative	Ann Cowan	23.80	1,144	1,145	1,200	1,329		
Conservative	Helen McDonald	18.39	884	885	935	998	1,094	1,500
Independent	Rhona Brock	13.28	638	640	723	985	996	
Liberal Democrats	Russell Auld	13.21	635	637	671			
Independent	Colin Crabbie	6.14	295	296				
Electorate: 8,102 Valid: 4,806 Spoilt: 101 Quota: 1,202 Turnout: 60.58%
