= Strathmore (ward) =

Electoral ward of Perth and Kinross, Scotland

Location of the ward

Strathmore is one of the twelve wards used to elect members of the Perth and Kinross Council. It elects four Councillors.

== Councillors ==
Election	Councillors			
2007	Alan Grant (SNP)	Ian Miller (SNP)	Dennis Melloy (Conservative)	Lewis Simpson (Liberal Democrats)
2012	Alan Grant (SNP)	Ian Miller (SNP)	Dennis Melloy (Conservative)	Lewis Simpson (Liberal Democrats)
2017	Fiona Sarwar (SNP)	Colin Stewart (Conservative)	Dennis Melloy (Conservative)	Lewis Simpson (Liberal Democrats)
2022	Grant Stewart (SNP)	Colin Stewart (Conservative)	Hugh Anderson (Conservative)	Jack Welch (SNP)

== Election results ==
=== 2022 Election ===
2022 Perth and Kinross Council election

Strathmore - 4 seats
Party	Candidate	FPv%	Count					
Party	Candidate	FPv%	1	2	3	4	5	6
SNP	Grant Stewart	26.3%	1,780					
Independent	Colin Stewart (incumbent)	17.4%	1,174	1,182.88	1,269.03	1,585.75		
Conservative	Hugh Anderson	15.3%	1,032	1,032.96	1,052.96	1,142.2	1,183.25	2,138.59
Conservative	Dennis Melloy (incumbent)	14.9%	1,009	1,011.4	1,027.64	1,107.64	1,153.79	
SNP	Jack Welch	9.9%	671	1,057.45	1,234.28	1,310.2	1,352.06	1,380.96
Liberal Democrats	Violet Iwanio	8.8%	598	600.88	756.32			
Green	Jill Belch	7.4%	500	514.15				
Electorate: 12,365 Valid: 6,764 Quota: 1,353 Turnout: 54.7%

=== 2017 Election ===
2017 Perth and Kinross Council election

Strathmore - 4 seats
Party	Candidate	FPv%	Count					
Party	Candidate	FPv%	1	2	3	4	5	6
Conservative	Dennis Melloy (incumbent)	26.7	1,833					
Liberal Democrats	Lewis Simpson (incumbent)	19.5	1,342	1,365.7	1,379.6			
SNP	Fiona Sarwar	18.2	1,251	1,266.9	1,267.8	1,267.9	1,355.9	1,417.8
Conservative	Colin Stewart	15.2	1,047	1,418.9				
SNP	Ian Stratton	12.6	866	868.7	869.1	869.5	899.2	940.8
Independent	Alan Livingstone *	3.9	270	277.2	282.2	283.4	358.08	
Green	Michael Gallagher	3.9	268	274.7	276.8	277.4		
Electorate: Valid: 6,877 Spoilt: 165 Quota: 1,376 Turnout: 7,042 (57.9%)

=== 2012 Election ===
2012 Perth and Kinross Council election

Strathmore - 4 seats
Party	Candidate	FPv%	Count
Party	Candidate	FPv%	1
Conservative	Dennis Melloy (incumbent)	23.66%	1,252
SNP	Alan Grant (incumbent)	21.11%	1,117
SNP	Ian Miller (incumbent)	20.56%	1,088
Liberal Democrats	Lewis Simpson (incumbent)	20.43%	1,081
Labour	Jamie Glackin	6.09%	322
Independent	Michael Gallagher	5.35%	283
Green	Louise Ramsay	2.80%	148
Electorate: - Valid: 5,291 Spoilt: 81 Quota: 1,059 Turnout: 5,372 (%)

=== 2007 Election ===
2007 Perth and Kinross Council election

Perth and Kinross council election, 2007: Strathmore
Party	Candidate	FPv%	Count							
Party	Candidate	FPv%	1	2	3	4	5	6	7	8
Conservative	Dennis Melloy	24.9	1,764							
Liberal Democrats	Lewis Simpson	19.6	1,390	1,444						
SNP	Alan Grant	15.0	1,066	1,087	1,088	1,103	1,147	1,262	1,365	1,651
SNP	Ian Miller	14.1	1,003	1,030	1,031	1,039	1,091	1,117	1,164	1,378
SNP	Stan McMillan	8.7	620	628	634	654	676	697	744	
Labour	Lorna Ferguson	6.6	470	483	486	506	553	606		
Independent	Michael Gallagher	4.3	308	334	335	401	449			
Green	Louise Ramsay	4.0	285	317	321	337				
Independent	Hugh Anderson	2.7	190	224	227					
Electorate: 11,504 Valid: 7,096 Spoilt: 125 Quota: 1,420 Turnout: 62.77%
