= Perth City Centre (ward) =

City ward

Location of the ward

Perth City Centre is one of the twelve wards used to elect members of the Perth and Kinross Council. It elects four Councillors.

== Councillors ==
Election	Councillors			
2007	Jack Coburn (SNP)	Archie MacLellan (Labour)	Heather Stewart (Conservative)	Peter Barrett (Liberal Democrats)
2012	Jack Coburn (SNP)	Archie MacLellan (Labour)	Heather Stewart (Conservative)	Peter Barrett (Liberal Democrats)
2015 By-	Andrew Parrott (SNP)	Archie MacLellan (Labour)	Heather Stewart (Conservative)	Peter Barrett (Liberal Democrats)
2017	Andrew Parrott (SNP)	Eric Drysdale (SNP)	Chris Ahern (Conservative)	Peter Barrett (Liberal Democrats)
2022	Andrew Parrott (SNP)	Eric Drysdale (SNP)	Chris Ahern (Conservative)	Peter Barrett (Liberal Democrats)

== Election results ==
=== 2022 Election ===
2022 Perth and Kinross Council election

Perth City Centre - 4 seats
Party	Candidate	FPv%	Count							
Party	Candidate	FPv%	1	2	3	4	5	6	7	8
SNP	Eric Drysdale (incumbent)	27.49%	1,445							
Liberal Democrats	Peter Barrett (incumbent)	19.75%	1,038	1,051.6	1,056.41					
Conservative	Chris Ahern (incumbent)	19.12%	1,005	1,008.26	1,009.26	1,010.19	1,026.22	1,037.52	1,042.48	1,328
SNP	Andrew Parrott (incumbent)	12.46%	655	979.46	1,006.45	1,007.02	1,013.84	1,174.36		
Labour	Scott Forsyth	8.28%	435	449.41	453.96	454.96	472.29	543.09	576.67	581.87
Conservative	Nick Tulloch	5.69%	299	299.54	299.54	299.87	305.89	312.92	314.49	
Green	Susannah Rae	5.1%	268	282.41	284.96	285.51	294.35			
Independent	Ian Thomson	1.28%	64	66.45	74.45	74.71				
Alba	Sandy Miller	0.91%	48	53.71						
Electorate: 12,856 Valid: 5,257 Quota: 1,052 Turnout: 41.8%

=== 2017 Election ===
2017 Perth and Kinross Council election

Perth City Centre - 4 seats
Party	Candidate	FPv%	Count							
Party	Candidate	FPv%	1	2	3	4	5	6	7	8
Conservative	Chris Ahern	32.75	1,763							
SNP	Eric Drysdale	19.99	1,076	1,091.17						
Liberal Democrats	Peter Barrett (incumbent)	19.28	1,038	1,313.87						
SNP	Andrew Parrott (incumbent)	14.08	758	763.06	780.22	792.2	792.21	809.79	895.96	1,086.4
Labour	Tricia Duncan	8.81	474	554.93	627.55	628.32	633.9	668.24	739.77	
Green	Fraser Hunter	3.23	174	191.51	218.62	219.19	225.54	250.69		
Scotland Independent Network	Ian Thomson	1.45	78	132.08	152.44	152.56	173.49			
Independent	David West	0.41	22	44.57	54.84	54.87				
Electorate: TBC Valid: 5,383 Spoilt: 129 Quota: 1,077 Turnout: 5,512 (44.7%)

=== 2012 Election ===
2012 Perth and Kinross Council election

Perth City Centre - 4 seats
Party	Candidate	FPv%	Count						
Party	Candidate	FPv%	1	2	3	4	5	6	7
SNP	Jack Coburn (incumbent)†	21.77%	923						
Liberal Democrats	Peter Barrett (incumbent)	21.09%	894						
Labour	Archie MacLellan (incumbent)	17.43%	739	742	751	751	778	834	1,038
SNP	Andy Hay	14.74%	625	691	697	698	716	749	
Conservative	Heather Stewart (incumbent)	16.58%	703	704	716	719	729	792	837
Independent	Nathan Shields	5.28%	224	225	230	241	279		
Perth Independent Candidates Party	Ian Thomson	2.62%	111	112	114	119			
Perth Independent Candidates Party	Mahesh Rednam	0.47%	20	20	21				
Electorate: - Valid: 4,239 Spoilt: 74 Quota: 848 Turnout: 4,315 (%)

=== 2007 Election ===
2007 Perth and Kinross Council election

Perth and Kinross council election, 2007: Perth City Centre
Party	Candidate	FPv%	Count					
Party	Candidate	FPv%	1	2	3	4	5	6
SNP	Jack Coburn	23.0	1,299					
Liberal Democrats	Peter Barrett	20.8	1,172					
Conservative	Heather Stewart	20.1	1,137					
Labour	Archie MacLellan	17.9	1,012	1,024	1,032	1,034	1,104	1,201
SNP	Gordon Hunter	8.6	488	598	604	604	664	745
Independent	Ian Thomson	5.3	298	305	312	313	364	
Green	Jack Cockin	4.2	238	249	258	259		
Electorate: 11,109 Valid: 5,644 Spoilt: 115 Quota: 1,129 Turnout: 51.84%
