= Kinross-shire (ward) =

Electoral ward of Perth and Kinross, Scotland

Location of the ward

Kinross-shire is one of the twelve wards used to elect members of the Perth and Kinross Council. It elects four Councillors.

== Councillors ==
Election	Councillors			
2007	Sandy Miller (SNP)	Willie Robertson (Liberal Democrats)	Michael Barnacle (Liberal Democrats /Ind.)	Kathleen Baird (Conservative)
2012	Joe Giacopazzi (SNP)	Willie Robertson (Liberal Democrats)	Michael Barnacle (Liberal Democrats /Ind.)	Dave Cuthbert (Ind.)
2017	Richard Watters (SNP)	Willie Robertson (Liberal Democrats)	Michael Barnacle (Liberal Democrats /Ind.)	Callum Purves (Conservative)
2022	Richard Watters (SNP)	Willie Robertson (Liberal Democrats)	Dave Cuthbert (Ind.)	Neil Freshwater (Conservative)

== Election results ==
=== 2022 Election ===
2022 Perth and Kinross Council election

Kinross-shire - 4 seats
Party	Candidate	FPv%	Count						
Party	Candidate	FPv%	1	2	3	4	5	6	7
SNP	Richard Watters (incumbent)	25.47%	1,638						
Liberal Democrats	Willie Robertson (incumbent)	20.93%	1,346						
Conservative	Neil Freshwater	14.88%	957	960.36	964.83	972.05	1,011.17	1,029.04	1,876.66
Conservative	George Stirling	14.38%	925	932.38	940.8	948.93	972.28	986.49	
Independent	Dave Cuthbert	11.27%	725	778.48	799.65	816.81	964.15	1,251.98	1,302.66
Labour	Graham Cox	6.81%	438	487	496.65	504.18			
Green	Pat Doran	5.15%	331	517.84	525.9	532	658.81		
Scottish Family	Gerald O'Connell	0.81%	52	58.04	58.66				
Electorate: 11,806 Valid: 6,432 Quota: 1,287 Turnout: 55.1%

=== 2017 Election ===
2017 Perth and Kinross Council election

Kinross-shire - 4 seats
Party	Candidate	FPv%	Count						
Party	Candidate	FPv%	1	2	3	4	5	6	7
Conservative	Callum Purves	26.73	1,642						
SNP	Richard Watters	19.03	1,169	1,171.77	1,224.77	1,253.02			
Liberal Democrats	Willie Robertson (incumbent)	17.29	1,062	1,104.51	1,128.76	1,235.76			
Independent	Mike Barnacle (incumbent)	12.16	747	759.07	777.07	807.07	813.07	814.7	1,272.92
Independent	Dave Cuthbert (incumbent)	9.77	600	618.86	637.12	689.37	695.79	698.03	
Conservative	John Ross	7.96	489	803.91	807.15	831.18	832.08	833.3	907.43
Labour	David MacKenzie	4.77	293	299.04	311.04				
Green	Karen Grunwell	2.31	142	143					
Electorate: TBC Valid: 6,144 Spoilt: 59 Quota: 1,229 Turnout: 6,203 (58.3%)

=== 2012 Election ===
2012 Perth and Kinross Council election

Kinross-shire - 4 seats
Party	Candidate	FPv%	Count							
Party	Candidate	FPv%	1	2	3	4	5	6	7	8
Independent	Dave Cuthbert	19.31%	897	905	915	964				
Independent	Mike Barnacle (incumbent)	17.27%	802	819	828	859	871	905	924	930
Liberal Democrats	Willie Robertson (incumbent)	16.99%	789	807	857	902	910	947		
Conservative	Kathleen Baird (incumbent)	14.98%	696	701	707	723	726	733	739	743
SNP	Joe Giacopazzi	14.04%	652	658	664	685	689	1,009		
SNP	Sandy Miller (incumbent)	8.45%	411	417	418	434	436			
Labour	Simon Edwin Bramwell	4.95%	230	241	246					
Liberal Democrats	Russell Auld	1.87%	87	91						
Green	Donald Fraser	1.74%	81							
Electorate: - Valid: 4,645 Spoilt: 37 Quota: 930 Turnout: 4,682 (%)

=== 2007 Election ===
2007 Perth and Kinross Council election

Perth and Kinross council election, 2007: Kinross-shire
Party	Candidate	FPv%	Count				
Party	Candidate	FPv%	1	2	3	4	5
SNP	Sandy Miller	25.0	1,445				
Liberal Democrats	Willie Robertson	22.7	1,314				
Conservative	Kathleen Baird	21.0	1,217				
Liberal Democrats	Michael Barnacle	16.3	942	1,010	1,094	1,115	1,242
Labour	Kate Milliken	11.2	650	692	713	717	774
Green	Andrew Thompson	3.7	216	278	295	302	
Electorate: 9,664 Valid: 49 Spoilt: 5,784 Quota: 1,157 Turnout: 60.36%
