= Roz McCall =

Scottish Conservative politician

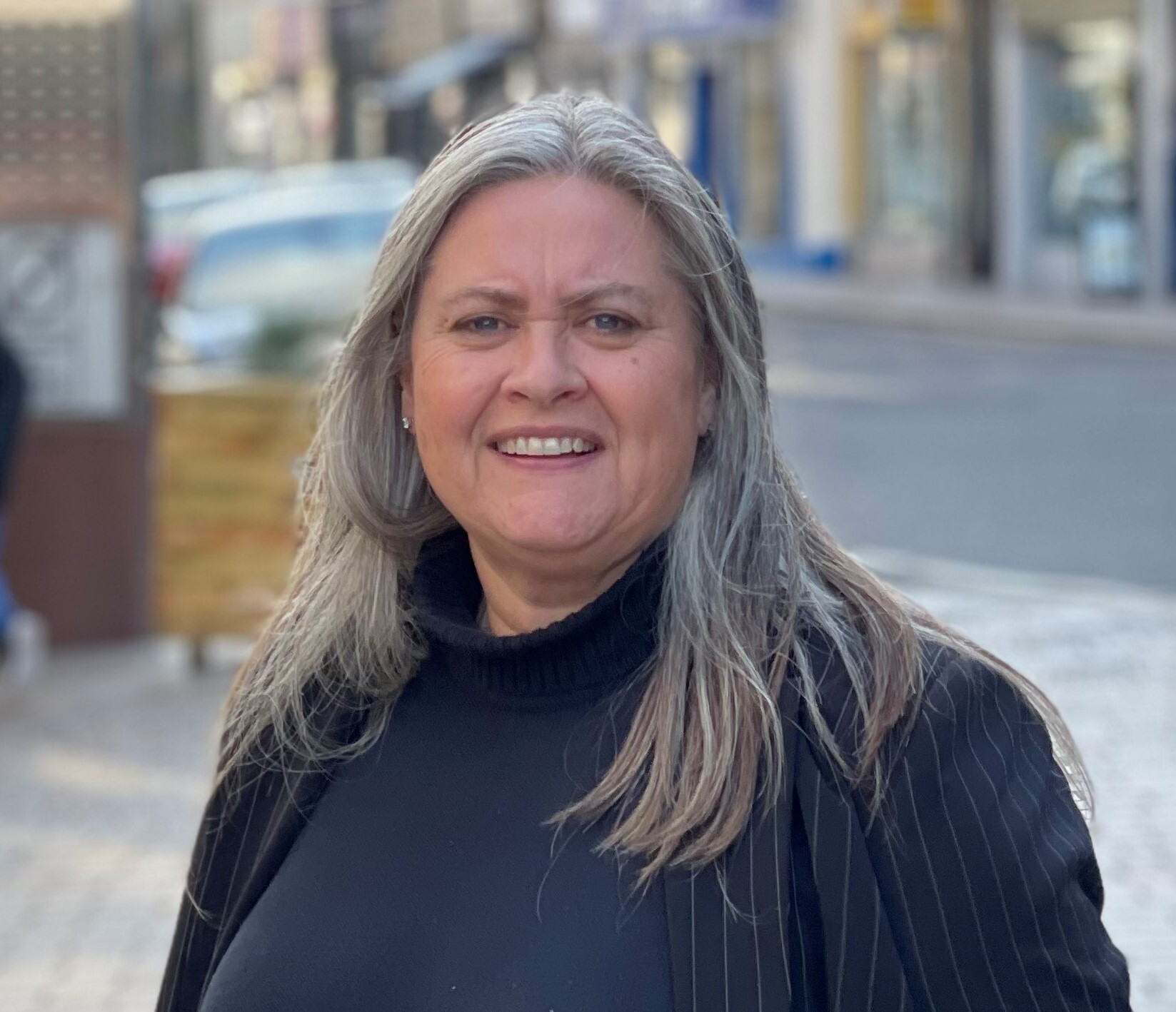
- McCall in Kirkcaldy

Member of the Scottish Parliament for Mid Scotland and Fife (1 of 7 Regional MSPs)
- In office 6 September 2022 – 9 April 2026
- Preceded by: Dean Lockhart

Personal details
- Born: Rosalind Stockton; 27 June 1969 (age 56) Bishopbriggs, Scotland, United Kingdom
- Party: Scottish Conservatives
- Children: 2

Rosalind McCall (née Stockton; born 27 June 1969) is a Scottish politician. She is a member of the Scottish Conservative and Unionist Party, and a former Member of the Scottish Parliament (MSP) for the Mid Scotland and Fife region.

== Early life ==
Daughter to Mary Miller Reid Stockton and James Wardlaw Stockton, McCall was born in Bishopbriggs at Stobhill Hospital; the family later moved to Milngavie. McCall attended Westbourne School in Glasgow from 1974 to 1987. Leaving school with 8 O grades and 3 Highers, she took an apprenticeship position at House of Fraser, completing her training and rising to Department Manager. She eventually set up her own business with her husband.

== Political career ==
In the 2017 Perth and Kinross Council election, she was elected to the Strathearn ward. McCall remained on Perth and Kinross Council until 2022.

In the 2019 general election, McCall was the Conservative candidate in Cumbernauld, Kilsyth and Kirkintilloch East winning 7,380 votes and coming in third place.

McCall stood in the Dunfermline constituency at the 2021 Scottish Parliament election, where she finished in third place with 15.4% of the vote. Additionally, she was fifth on the party list for the Mid Scotland and Fife region.

=== Member of the Scottish Parliament ===
McCall replaced Dean Lockhart in the Scottish Parliament in 2022 – who had resigned – as an additional member for the Mid Scotland and Fife electoral region. Upon taking her seat in the Scottish Parliament on 20 September 2022, she became the first MSP to swear allegiance to King Charles III, following the death of Queen Elizabeth II earlier that month.

In October 2024, McCall was appointed Shadow Minister for Children and Young People in the Shadow Cabinet of Russell Findlay.

In the 2026 Scottish Parliament election, she was the Scottish Conservative candidate in the constituency of Perthshire South and Kinross-shire, she wasn't elected.

== Personal life ==
Roz and her husband Ewan Graeme McCall were married in 1994. They are adoptive parents to two daughters. The couple now live in Dunblane.
