= Brian Leishman =

Scottish politician (born 1982)

Brian Leishman MP
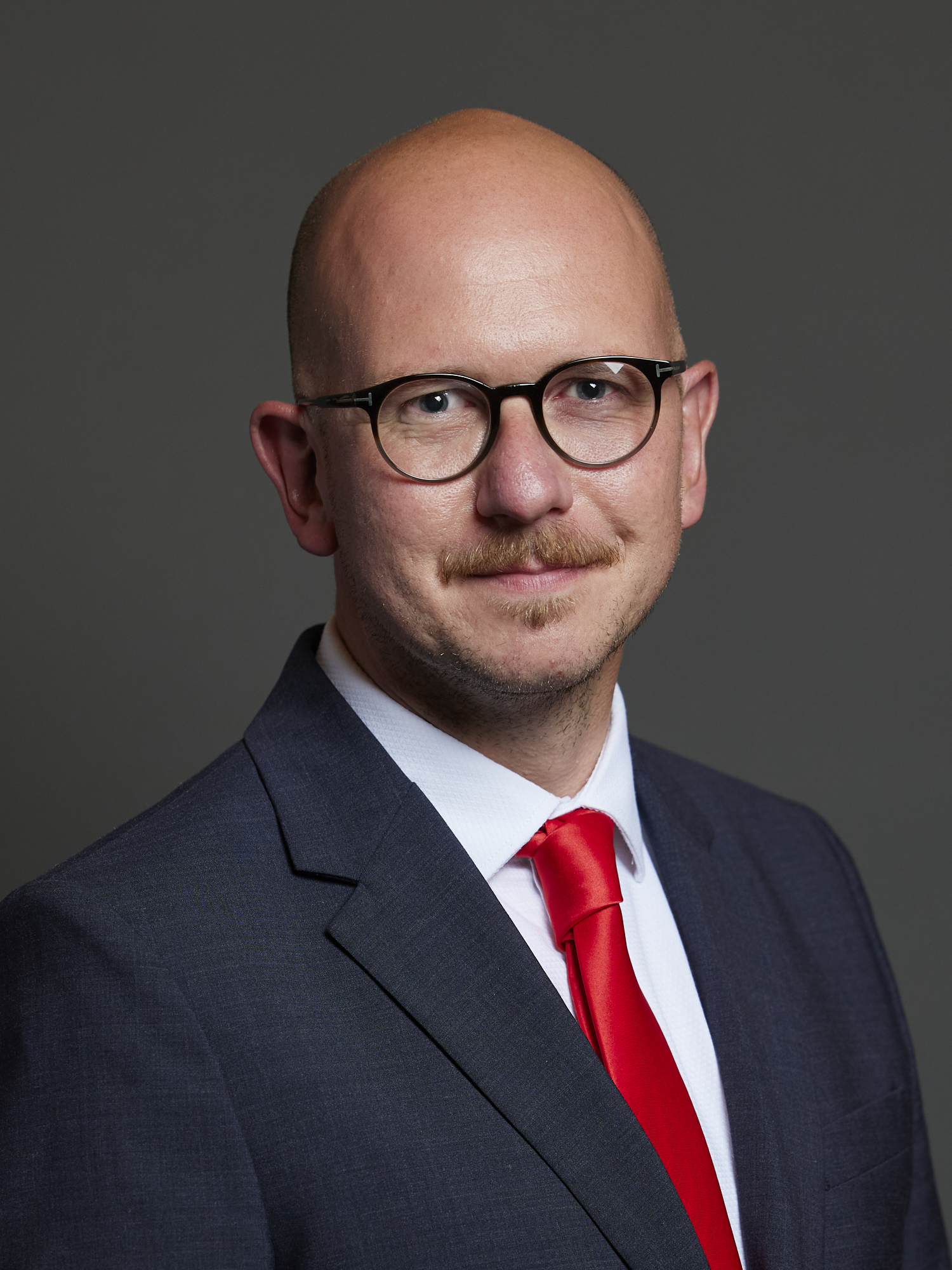
- Official portrait, 2024

Member of Parliament for Alloa and Grangemouth
- Incumbent
- Assumed office 4 July 2024
- Preceded by: Constituency established
- Majority: 6,122 (14.9%)

Member of Perth and Kinross Council for Perth City North
- In office 5 May 2022 – 1 August 2024
- Succeeded by: Carol Mair

Personal details
- Born: Brian William Leishman; July 1982 (age 44) Almondbank, Scotland, United Kingdom
- Party: Labour
- Children: 1
- Education: University of Stirling; Abertay University (BA)
- Occupation: Politician; golfer

Brian William Leishman (born July 1982) is a Scottish politician and golfer who has served as Member of Parliament (MP) for Alloa and Grangemouth since 2024. On the political left, he is a member of the Socialist Campaign Group within the Labour Party.

== Early life and career ==
Leishman was educated at St Columba's High School in Perth. He began a history and politics degree at the University of Stirling, but left after several weeks to pursue a golfing career.

Leishman is a member of the Professional Golfers' Association, and has received a Bachelor of Arts in golf management from Abertay University. He has coached at numerous Scottish golf clubs, including Alloa Golf Club where he owned a shop prior to his election to Parliament.

== Political career ==
In 2022, Leishman was elected as a Member of Perth and Kinross Council for Perth City North. As a councillor, he served as a director of two council-funded sports bodies. He resigned from the Council in August 2024.

At the 2024 general election, Leishman was elected as MP for the newly established Alloa and Grangemouth constituency. He defeated SNP candidate John Nicolson, who was the incumbent MP for one of its predecessor seats.

Leishman voted against the Terminally Ill Adults (End of Life) Bill, that would legalise assisted suicide in England and Wales. He has been a member of the trade unions Community and Unite.

On 16 July 2025, Leishman had the whip withdrawn following reported breaches of party discipline, including voting against the party line and making public comments critical of the leadership. In response to his suspension, Leishman stated that he remained a "proud Labour member" and wished to continue serving as a Labour MP. He said that his votes against the government were motivated by a desire to represent his constituents effectively, particularly those impacted by austerity. Leishman added, "It is not my duty as an MP to make people poorer," and reaffirmed his commitment to delivering positive change for communities across Alloa and Grangemouth.

On 7 November 2025, the whip was restored. In February 2026, he called on Keir Starmer to resign. On 11 May 2026, he called on Anas Sarwar and Jackie Baillie to resign following the results of the 2026 Scottish Parliament election.

In 2026, he publicly opposed calls from Andy Burnham to rejoin the European Union, revealing he had voted Leave in the 2016 referendum on the subject.
