= Perth City North (ward) =

Location of the ward

Perth City North is one of the twelve wards used to elect members of the Perth and Kinross Council. It elects three Councillors.

== Councillors ==
Election	Councillors			
2007	Elspeth Maclachlan (SNP)	Dave Scott (SNP)	John Flynn (Labour)	Calum Gillies (Labour)
2012	Elspeth Maclachlan (SNP)	Dave Doogan (SNP)	John Flynn (Labour)	Calum Gillies (Labour)
2017	John Rebbeck (SNP)	Dave Doogan (SNP)	Harry Coates (Conservative)	3 seats
2022	John Rebbeck (SNP)	Ian Massie (SNP)	Brian Leishman (Labour)	3 seats
2024 by-	John Rebbeck (SNP)	Ian Massie (SNP)	Carol Mair (SNP)	3 seats

== Election results ==
=== 2024 by-election ===
Perth City North by-election (26 September 2024) - 1 seat
Party	Candidate	FPv%	Count				
Party	Candidate	FPv%	1	2	3	4	5
SNP	Carol Mair	44.7	917	946	961	1,015	1,058
Labour	Kirsten Nkwocha-Dyer	15.3	313	331	358	374	409
Conservative	Aziz Rehman	14.4	296	297	316	323	365
Reform	Sonia Davidson	10.2	209	213	220	234	
Alba	Robert Reid	6.5	133	139	145		
Liberal Democrats	Tina Ng-a-Mann	4.6	95	111			
Green	Caitlin Ripley	4.2	87				
Electorate: 9,128 Quota: 1,050 Turnout: 22.7

=== 2022 Election ===
2022 Perth and Kinross Council election

Perth City North - 3 seats
Party	Candidate	FPv%	Count						
Party	Candidate	FPv%	1	2	3	4	5	6	7
SNP	Ian Massie (incumbent)	32.66%	1,129						
SNP	John Rebbeck (incumbent)	22.53%	779	997.63					
Conservative	Aziz Rehman	19.58%	677	678.17	680.22	685.32	715.45	733.13	
Labour	Brian Leishman	15.33%	530	539.12	560.19	570.98	639.01	735.77	1,091.10
Liberal Democrats	James Graham	4.25%	147	148.40	156.76	170.05			
Green	Ronnie McNeil	3.47%	120	131.93	170.87	198.72	228.03		
Alba	Alan Black	2.17%	75	79.21	94.65				
Electorate: 9,041 Valid: 3,457 Quota: 865 Turnout: 39.3%

=== 2017 Election ===
2017 Perth and Kinross Council election

Perth City North - 3 seats
Party	Candidate	FPv%	Count							
Party	Candidate	FPv%	1	2	3	4	5	6	7	8
SNP	Dave Doogan (incumbent)	35.37	1,290							
Conservative	Harry Coates	25.58	933							
Labour	Calum Gillies (incumbent)	15.82	577	596.34	601.15	606.47	619.92	674.5	722.49	
SNP	John Rebbeck	13.16	480	797.63	798.15	799.44	817.98	836.76	870.49	1,047.4
Liberal Democrats	Philip Brown	3.45	126	131.86	135.71	137.73	141.91			
Independent	Elspeth MacLachlan (incumbent)*	3.1	113	118.57	120.01	124.05	188.88	213.64		
Independent	Sam Finlayson	2.5	91	97.45	99.45	119.88				
Independent	Arthur Frater	1.01	37	38.17	38.53					
Electorate: TBC Valid: 3,647 Spoilt: 108 Quota: 912 Turnout: 3,755 (41.1%)

=== 2012 Election ===
2012 Perth and Kinross Council election

Perth City North - 4 seats
Party	Candidate	FPv%	Count						
Party	Candidate	FPv%	1	2	3	4	5	6	7
SNP	Dave Doogan	31.35%	1,239						
Labour	John Flynn (incumbent)	23.10%	913						
SNP	Elspeth Maclachlan (incumbent)	14.88%	588	690	693	707	1,115		
Labour	Calum Gillies (incumbent)	13.31%	526	554	658	692	706	767	908
Conservative	Yvonne Clark	10.37%	410	414	416	457	460	472	
SNP	Liam Hannan	3.80%	150	432	435	451			
Liberal Democrats	Philip Brown	3.19%	126	131	133				
Electorate: - Valid: 3,952 Spoilt: 100 Quota: 791 Turnout: 4,052 (%)

=== 2007 Election ===
2007 Perth and Kinross Council election

Perth and Kinross council election, 2007: Perth City North
Party	Candidate	FPv%	Count						
Party	Candidate	FPv%	1	2	3	4	5	6	7
SNP	Elspeth Maclachlan	23.5	1,217						
SNP	Dave Scott	19.3	1,001	1,127					
Labour	John Flynn	18.5	958	964	975	991	1,146		
Conservative	Douglas Gratty	13.4	694	698	703	725	842	847	
Labour	Calum Gillies	12.8	666	675	684	697	785	867	1,115
Liberal Democrats	Philip Brown	10.1	523	529	541	593			
Green	Adam Ramsay	2.5	130	135	147				
Electorate: 11,189 Valid: 5,189 Spoilt: 153 Quota: 1,038 Turnout: 47.74%
