= Perth City South (ward) =

Electoral ward of Perth and Kinross, Scotland

Location of the ward

Perth City South is one of the twelve wards used to elect members of the Perth and Kinross Council. It elects four Councillors.

== Councillors ==
| Election | Councillors | | | |
|---|---|---|---|---|
| 2007 | Robert Band (SNP) | Willie Wilson (Liberal Democrats) | Lorraine Caddell (Liberal Democrats) | Alexander Stewart (Conservative) |
| 2012 | Robert Band (SNP) | Willie Wilson (Liberal Democrats) | Alistair Munro (Labour) | Alexander Stewart (Conservative) |
| 2017 | Robert Band (SNP) | Willie Wilson (Liberal Democrats) | Sheila McCole (SNP) | Michael Jamieson (Conservative) |
| 2017 by- | Robert Band (SNP) | Willie Wilson (Liberal Democrats) | Sheila McCole (SNP) | Audrew Coates (Conservative) |
| 2022 | Iain Macpherson (SNP) | Liz Barrett (Liberal Democrats) | Sheila McCole (SNP) | Andy Chan (Conservative) |

== Election results ==
=== 2022 Election ===
2022 Perth and Kinross Council election

Perth City South - 4 seats
| Party | Candidate | FPv% | Count | | | | | | |
| Party | Candidate | FPv% | 1 | 2 | 3 | 4 | 5 | 6 | 7 |
|---|---|---|---|---|---|---|---|---|---|
| Liberal Democrats | Liz Barrett (incumbent) | 33.88% | 2,315 | | | | | | |
| SNP | Iain Macpherson | 20.15% | 1,377 | | | | | | |
| Conservative | Andy Chan | 16.84% | 1,151 | 1,419.22 | | | | | |
| SNP | Sheila McCole (incumbent) | 13.49% | 922 | 1,044.85 | 1,046.23 | 1,055.39 | 1,243.90 | 1,257.02 | 1,489.86 |
| Conservative | Calum Milne | 5.91% | 404 | 483.85 | 524.41 | 524.44 | 542.62 | | |
| Labour | Kirsten Roper | 5.63% | 385 | 547.57 | 550.3 | 550.5 | 652.11 | 795.49 | |
| Green | Elspeth McLachlan | 4.08% | 279 | 411.27 | 412.53 | 412.86 | | | |
Electorate: 13,427 Valid: 6,833 Quota: 1,367 Turnout: 51.6%

=== 2017 By-elections ===
Perth City South By-election (23 November 2017) - 1 Seat
| Party | Candidate | FPv% | Count | | | | | |
| Party | Candidate | FPv% | 1 | 2 | 3 | 4 | 5 | 6 |
|---|---|---|---|---|---|---|---|---|
| SNP | Pauline Leitch | 32.1 | 1,780 | 1,781 | 1,813 | 1,883 | 2,227 | |
| Conservative | Audrey Coates | 31.2 | 1,734 | 1,738 | 1,744 | 1,762 | 2,381 | 2,863 |
| Liberal Democrats | Liz Barrett | 28.8 | 1,597 | 1,601 | 1,627 | 1,733 | | |
| Labour | Tricia Duncan | 5.7 | 314 | 319 | 332 | | | |
| Green | Elspeth MacLachlan | 1.8 | 102 | 105 | 332 | | | |
| Independent | Denise Baykal | 0.5 | 25 | | | | | |
Electorate: 12,998 Valid: 5,552 Spoilt: 55 Quota: 2,777 Turnout: 43.1%

=== 2017 Election ===
2017 Perth and Kinross Council election

Perth City South - 4 seats
| Party | Candidate | FPv% | Count | | | | | | |
| Party | Candidate | FPv% | 1 | 2 | 3 | 4 | 5 | 6 | 7 |
|---|---|---|---|---|---|---|---|---|---|
| Liberal Democrats | William Wilson (incumbent) | 34.66 | 2,417 | | | | | | |
| Conservative | Michael Jamieson† | 25.2 | 1,757 | | | | | | |
| SNP | Bob Band (incumbent) | 14.9 | 1,039 | 1,151.05 | 1,158.26 | 1,169.32 | 1,226.72 | 1,267.05 | 1,381.62 |
| SNP | Sheila McCole | 10.81 | 754 | 828.42 | 831.92 | 837.24 | 904.96 | 944.39 | 1,083.36 |
| Labour | Alistair Munro (incumbent) | 6.37 | 444 | 615.25 | 678.5 | 702.63 | 780.71 | 902.22 | |
| Independent | Susan Bathgate | 3.63 | 253 | 417.9 | 471.68 | 560.41 | 600.75 | | |
| Green | Paul Vallot | 3.05 | 213 | 306.45 | 322.72 | 337.21 | | | |
| Independent | Damian Houston | 1.38 | 96 | 176.34 | 211.16 | | | | |
Electorate: TBC Valid: 6,973 Spoilt: 113 Quota: 1,395 Turnout: 7,086 (55%)

=== 2012 Election ===
2012 Perth and Kinross Council election

Perth City South - 4 seats
| Party | Candidate | FPv% | Count | | | | | | | |
| Party | Candidate | FPv% | 1 | 2 | 3 | 4 | 5 | 6 | 7 | 8 |
|---|---|---|---|---|---|---|---|---|---|---|
| Liberal Democrats | William Wilson (incumbent) | 25.70% | 1,288 | | | | | | | |
| Conservative | Alexander Stewart (incumbent) | 21.27% | 1,066 | | | | | | | |
| SNP | Bob Band (incumbent) | 18.18% | 911 | 936 | 938 | 957 | 998 | 1,468 | | |
| Labour | Alistair Munro | 11.02% | 552 | 568 | 572 | 605 | 669 | 694 | 757 | 937 |
| SNP | Murray Duncan | 9.4% | 471 | 486 | 488 | 511 | 546 | | | |
| Liberal Democrats | Lorraine Caddell (incumbent) | 5.73% | 287 | 453 | 467 | 489 | 558 | 568 | 657 | |
| Green | Alice Walsh | 4.53% | 227 | 237 | | | | | | |
| Independent | Iona MacGregor | 4.17% | 209 | 221 | 231 | | | | | |
Electorate: - Valid: 5,011 Spoilt: 46 Quota: 1,003 Turnout: 5,057 (%)

=== 2007 Election ===
2007 Perth and Kinross Council election

Perth and Kinross council election, 2007: Perth City South
| Party | Candidate | FPv% | Count | | | | | | |
| Party | Candidate | FPv% | 1 | 2 | 3 | 4 | 5 | 6 | 7 |
|---|---|---|---|---|---|---|---|---|---|
| Liberal Democrats | Willie Wilson | 29.8 | 1,789 | | | | | | |
| Conservative | Alexander Stewart | 29.4 | 1,768 | | | | | | |
| SNP | Robert Band | 17.2 | 1,033 | 1,063 | 1,087 | 1,122 | 1,564 | | |
| Labour | Jock Munro | 13.3 | 796 | 836 | 881 | 916 | 938 | 968 | |
| Liberal Democrats | Lorraine Caddell | 10.3 | 618 | 867 | 991 | 1,049 | 1,085 | 1,156 | 1,573 |
| SNP | Andrew Gadsden | 8.1 | 485 | 513 | 532 | 564 | | | |
| Independent | Keith Mothersson | 3.2 | 191 | 201 | 222 | | | | |
Electorate: 10,914 Valid: 6,680 Spoilt: 80 Quota: 1,337 Turnout: 61.94%
