= Almond and Earn (ward) =

Electoral ward of Perth and Kinross, Scotland

Location of the ward

Almond and Earn is one of the twelve wards used to elect members of the Perth and Kinross Council. It elects three Councillors.

== Councillors ==
Election	Councillors		
2007	Wilma Lumsden (SNP)	George Hayton (Liberal Democrats)	Alan Jack (Conservative; Ind.)
2012	Henry Anderson (SNP)	Alan Livingstone (Conservative)	Alan Jack (Conservative; Ind.)
2017	Henry Anderson (SNP)	Kathleen Baird (Conservative)	David Illingworth (Conservative)
2022	Michelle Frampton (SNP)	Frank Smith (Conservative)	David Illingworth (Conservative)

== Election results ==
=== 2022 Election ===
2022 Perth and Kinross Council election

Almond & Earn - 3 seats
Party	Candidate	FPv%	Count				
Party	Candidate	FPv%	1	2	3	4	5
SNP	Michelle Frampton	33.81%	1,339				
Conservative	David Illingworth (incumbent)	27.93%	1,106				
Conservative	Frank Smith (incumbent)	20.35%	806	817.44	916.73	933.271	1,035.53
Liberal Democrats	Tina Ng-A-Mann	8.76%	347	397.94	404.7	424.22	
Green	Paul Vallot	7.88%	312	503.28	505.15	521.61	683.39
UKIP	Lynda Davis	1.26%	50	63.77	64.71		
Electorate: 7,985 Valid: 3,960 Quota: 991 Turnout: 50.2%

=== 2017 Election ===
2017 Perth and Kinross Council election

Almond and Earn - 3 seats
Party	Candidate	FPv%	Count				
Party	Candidate	FPv%	1	2	3	4	5
Conservative	Kathleen Baird (incumbent)	42.08	1,724				
SNP	Henry Anderson (incumbent)	21.53	882	899.84	905.35	972.91	1,312.13
Conservative	David Illingworth	17.5	717	1,324.36			
SNP	Peter Glennie	8.05	330	332.43	335.48	379.6	
Liberal Democrats	Chris Rennie	5.61	230	253.52	344.1	435.66	445.7
Green	Linda Buchan	5.22	214	232.25	254.07		
Electorate: TBC Valid: 4,097 Spoilt: 113 Quota: 1,025 Turnout: 4,210 (55.2%)

=== 2012 Election ===
2012 Perth and Kinross Council election

Almond and Earn - 3 seats
Party	Candidate	FPv%	Count					
Party	Candidate	FPv%	1	2	3	4	5	6
Conservative	Alan Livingstone	30.14%	1,112					
SNP	Henry Anderson	24.18%	892	901	923			
SNP	Wilma Lumsden (incumbent)	17.02%	628	640	670	671	756	
Independent	Alan Jack (incumbent)††	12.04%	444	493	597	597	771	987
Labour	Andrew Dundas	10.0%	369	381	451	451		
Liberal Democrats	George Hayton (incumbent)	6.61%	244	284				
Electorate: - Valid: 3,689 Spoilt: 36 Quota: 923 Turnout: 3,725 (%)

=== 2007 Election ===
2007 Perth and Kinross Council election

Perth and Kinross council election, 2007: Almond and Earn
Party	Candidate	FPv%	Count			
Party	Candidate	FPv%	1	2	3	4
SNP	Wilma Lumsden	36.6	1,790			
Conservative	Alan Jack	30.2	1,477			
Liberal Democrats	George Hayton	17.3	849	1,078	1,120	1,610
Conservative	Pamella Roberts	15.9	778	853	1,017	
Electorate: 7,995 Valid: 4,894 Spoilt: 79 Quota: 1,224 Turnout: 62.20%
