= Alexander Stewart (Conservative politician) =

Scottish Conservative politician

Alexander Stewart MBE
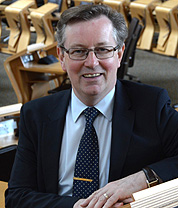

Member of the Scottish Parliament for Mid Scotland and Fife (1 of 7 Regional MSPs)
- In office 6 May 2016 – 9 April 2026

Personal details
- Born: Alexander James Stewart; 29 November 1962 (age 63) Perth, Scotland
- Party: Scottish Conservative Party

Alexander James Stewart MBE (born 29 November 1962) is a Scottish Conservative Party politician who served as a Member of the Scottish Parliament (MSP) for the Mid Scotland and Fife region from 2016 until 2026.

== Political career ==
Stewart began his political career when he was elected to Perth and Kinross Council as a councillor for Perth City South.

Stewart stood in the 2015 general election as the Scottish Conservative candidate for Perth and North Perthshire, coming second to the Scottish National Party (SNP)'s Pete Wishart, who was returned with a near 10,000 majority.

=== Member of the Scottish Parliament ===
In the 2016 Scottish Parliament election, Stewart stood as the Scottish Conservative candidate for Clackmannanshire and Dunblane, where he came third with 6,915 votes (23.2%). He was then elected from the Mid Scotland and Fife regional list.

Following his election to the Scottish Parliament, he stood down as a councillor at the 2017 Scottish local elections having served in the role for 18 years.

Stewart campaigned for Britain to leave the European Union in the 2016 EU Referendum.

Formerly the Scottish Conservative spokesperson for International Development and External Affairs in the Scottish Parliament; Alexander was promoted to Spokesperson and Shadow Minister for Local Government in June 2017 by Scottish Conservative Party leader Ruth Davidson. He currently serves as the Scottish Conservatives' Deputy Constitution, External Affairs and Culture Spokesperson.

At the 2021 Scottish Parliament election, Stewart came second in Clackmannanshire and Dunblane, beating the Labour challenger, with 8,292 votes (25.6%). On the regional list, the Conservatives returned all four of their MSPs, including Stewart, who had been placed fourth.
