= Dave Doogan =

Scottish politician

Dave Doogan MP
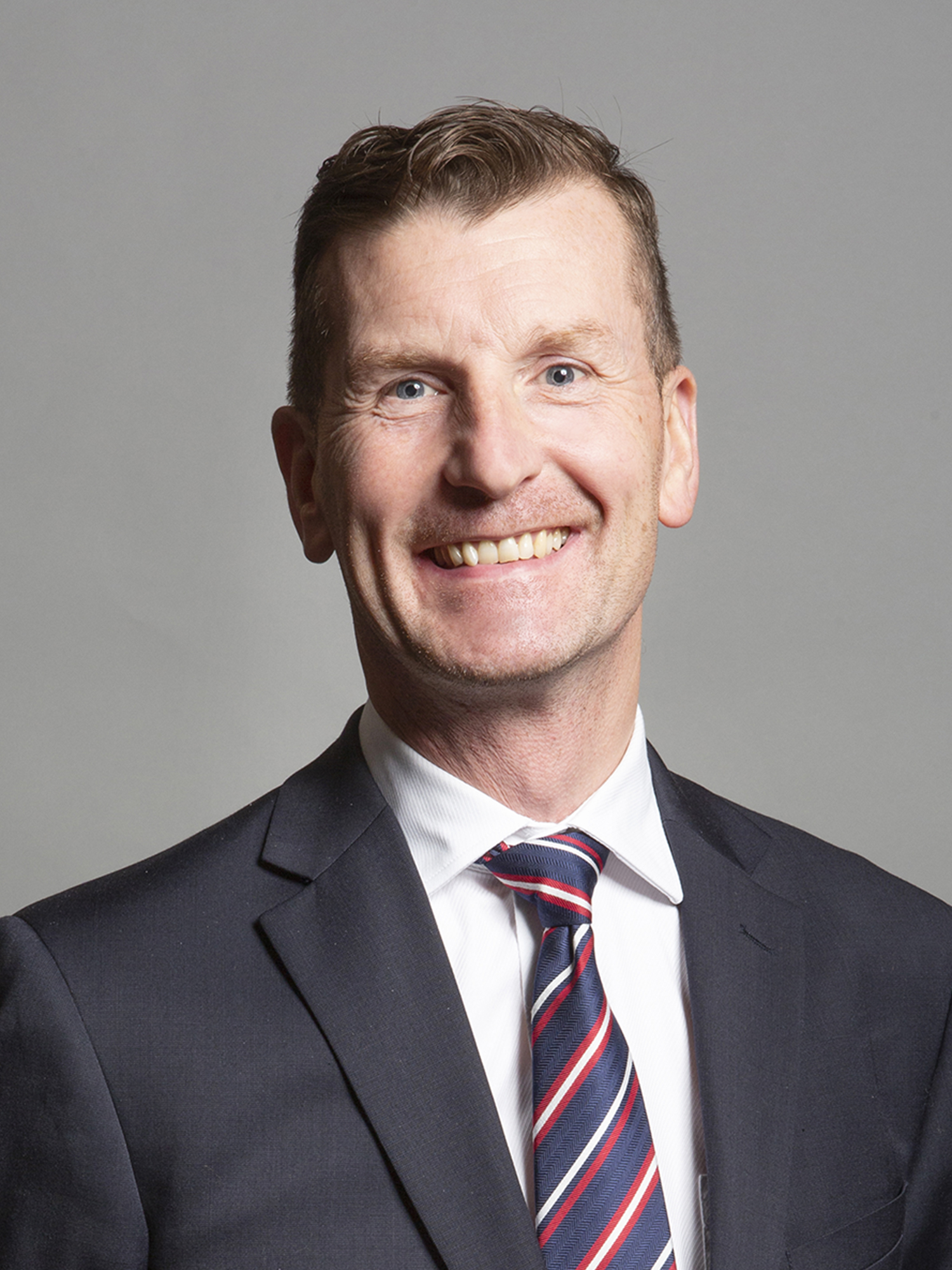
- Official portrait, 2019

Leader of the Scottish National Party in the House of Commons
- Incumbent
- Assumed office 12 May 2026
- Deputy: Pete Wishart
- Party Leader: John Swinney
- Preceded by: Stephen Flynn
SNP spokesperson roles
SNP Economy Spokesperson in the House of Commons
Incumbent
Assumed office 10 July 2024
Leader	Stephen Flynn; Himself
Preceded by	Drew Hendry
SNP Defence Spokesperson in the House of Commons
Incumbent
Assumed office 10 July 2024
Leader	Stephen Flynn; Himself
Preceded by	Martin Docherty-Hughes
In office 10 December 2022 – 4 September 2023
Leader	Stephen Flynn
Preceded by	Stewart McDonald
Succeeded by	Martin Docherty-Hughes
SNP Energy Security and Net Zero Spokesperson in the House of Commons
In office 4 September 2023 – 16 June 2025
Leader	Stephen Flynn
Preceded by	Alan Brown
Succeeded by	Graham Leadbitter

Member of Parliament for Angus and Perthshire Glens Angus (2019–2024)
- Incumbent
- Assumed office 12 December 2019
- Preceded by: Kirstene Hair
- Majority: 4,870 (10.3%)

Personal details
- Born: David Michael Doogan; 4 March 1973 (age 53) Perth, Scotland
- Party: Scottish National Party
- Spouse: Gillian Kirk (m. 1999)
- Children: 2
- Education: University of Dundee (MA)
- Website: davedooganmp.scot

David Michael Doogan (born 4 March 1973) is a Scottish National Party (SNP) politician who has served as the Leader of the Scottish National Party in the House of Commons since May 2026. Doogan was the SNP's Energy Security and Net Zero Spokesperson from September 2023 to July 2024, and has served as the Member of Parliament (MP) for Angus and Perthshire Glens previously Angus, since 2019.

== Early life and career ==
David Doogan was born on 4 March 1973 in Perth to Irish parents James and Anne (née Walsh) Doogan. Following his schooling in Perth, Doogan worked as an aircraft engineer for the Ministry of Defence specialising in Sea King Search and Rescue Aircraft.

He left his career in the Ministry of Defence in 2007 to pursue a career in politics, studying at the University of Dundee. Doogan graduated in 2011 with a first-class MA (Hons) in Politics and International Relations.

From 2011 to 2016, Doogan worked in the office of the then Scottish Finance Secretary and Deputy First Minister John Swinney.

== Perth and Kinross Council (2012–2020) ==
Doogan was elected to Perth and Kinross Council as a councillor for Perth City North ward in 2012, with the largest share of first preference votes in that ward. Upon election, Doogan became Convenor of Housing and Health, having responsibility for council housing and social care. Doogan was also an ex officio member of the board of NHS Tayside. He later identified achievements from this time as including the construction of a footbridge over the A9, the building of the £11m Tulloch Primary School, the renovation of Perth Crematorium and the conversion of a number of disused sites to council housing.

Doogan served as chair of Perth and Kinross Integration Joint Board from 2015 to 2017.

Doogan was reelected to Perth and Kinross Council in 2017, the only of Perth City North's four incumbents to do so. Additionally, he increased his share of the vote by 4.02%. At the election Doogan became the leader of the SNP group on Perth and Kinross Council, and as such, Leader of the Opposition. Doogan was also a member of the JD Fergusson Arts Awards Trust, the Convention of Scottish Local Authorities, the Perth City Development Board, Perth Common Good Fund and the Tayside Valuation Joint Board, among others.

After his election to Parliament in December 2019 Doogan announced his intention to stand down as a councillor, with the timing of his resignation subject to the Chief Executive of PKC scheduling a by-election.

Doogan formally stood down as a councillor at a full council meeting in February 2020. The SNP retained the seat vacated by Doogan with a majority of 38%.

== Member of Parliament (2019–present) ==
=== Election ===
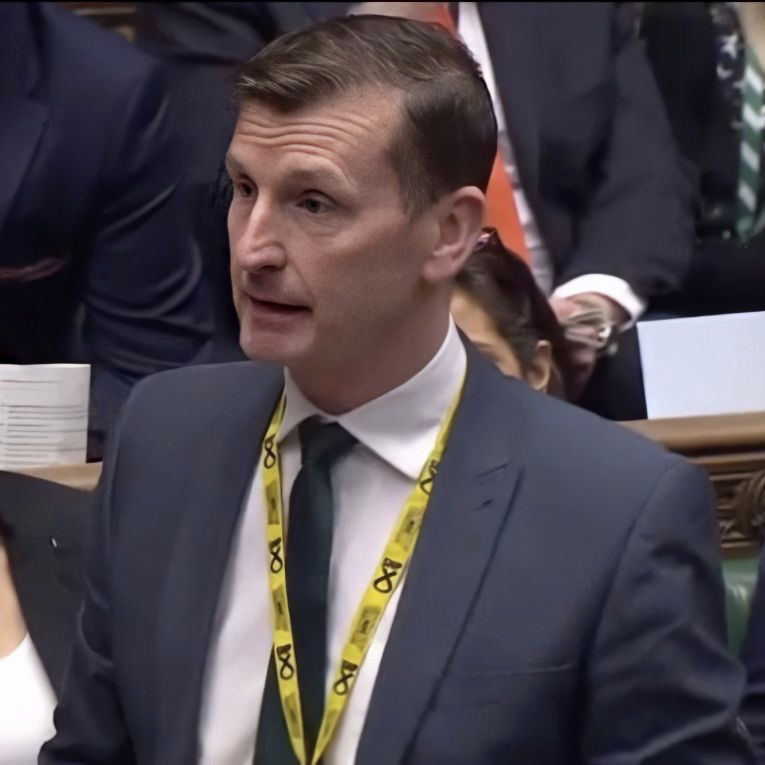
Doogan in the House of Commons

At the 2019 general election, Doogan was elected to Parliament as MP for Angus with 49.1% of the vote and a majority of 3,795 votes. Doogan was sworn into Parliament on 18 December 2019, taking the oath on the Jerusalem Bible, and made his maiden speech on 21 January 2020. His first contribution in Parliament was a Question to the Prime Minister.

=== Spokesperson roles ===
Doogan became the SNP Spokesperson for Agriculture and Rural Affairs on 7 January 2020, taking the SNP seat on the Environment, Food and Rural Affairs Select Committee. On 16 October 2020, he also became Spokesperson for Manufacturing. In January 2022, as part of a reshuffle, Doogan became SNP Spokesperson for Defence Procurement and took up the SNP seat on the Defence Select Committee. Following the 2022 SNP Westminster leadership election, the new leader, Stephen Flynn, promoted Doogan to the SNP frontbench as Spokesperson for Defence.

In May 2023, Doogan stated that he had contacted the Independent Parliamentary Standards Authority (IPSA) in order to repay a London congestion charge penalty claimed in error. Doogan later described the incident as "very difficult", as reporting had suggested that the claim related to a speeding fine and that IPSA had contacted Doogan to request repayment, rather than Doogan contacting IPSA. Doogan confirmed that he received a full apology from IPSA following the incident.

In September 2023, Doogan was appointed the SNP's Energy Security and Net Zero Spokesperson. Due to the 2023 Periodic Review of Westminster constituencies, Doogan's constituency of Angus was abolished, and replaced with Angus and Perthshire Glens. At the 2024 general election, Doogan was elected to Parliament as MP for Angus and Perthshire Glens with 40.4% of the vote and a majority of 4,870. On 16 June 2025, Doogan replaced Stephen Flynn on the Scottish Affairs Select Committee.

=== SNP Westminster leader ===
On 12 May 2026, following the resignation of Stephen Flynn, Doogan was elected as Leader of the Scottish National Party in the House of Commons. This was following Flynn's election in the 2026 Scottish Parliament election and his resignation as an MP.

== Personal life ==
Doogan married Gillian Kirk in 1999; they have a son and daughter. He is Catholic.

Parliament of the United Kingdom
Preceded by Kirstene Hair	Member of Parliament for Angus; 2019–present	Incumbent
