= 2022 Perth and Kinross Council election =

2022 Perthshire local elections

- 5 May 2022

All 40 seats to Perth and Kinross Council 21 seats needed for a majority
	First party	Second party	Third party
Leader	Grant Laing	Murray Lyle	Willie Wilson
Party	SNP	Conservative	Liberal Democrats
Leader's seat	Strathtay	Strathallan (retiring)	Perth City South (retiring)
Last election	15 seats, 31.2%	17 seats, 40.9%	4 seats, 12.5%
Seats won	16	14	4
Seat change	▲1	▼3	Steady
Popular vote	22,273	19,643	7,961
Percentage	36.6%	32.3%	13.1%
Swing	▲5.4%	▼8.6%	▲0.7%
	Fourth party	Fifth party
Leader	Various	Alasdair Bailey
Party	Independent	Labour
Leader's seat	Various	Carse of Gowrie
Last election	3 seat, 6.7%	1 seat, 5.2%
Seats won	4	2
Seat change	▲1	▲1
Popular vote	4,399	3,432
Percentage	7.2%	5.6%
Swing	▲0.5%	▲0.4%
- Composition of the council following the election
Council Leader before election
Murray Lyle
Conservative
Council Leader after election
SNP

The 2022 Perth and Kinross Council election was held on 5 May 2022 on the same day as the 31 other local authorities in Scotland. The election used the 12 wards created under the Local Governance (Scotland) Act 2004, with 40 councillors elected. Each ward elects either 3 or 4 members - using the STV electoral system - a form of proportional representation.

Following the declaration of the results on 6 May 2022, talks began between the political groupings to determine who will be able to form an administration, which will result in posts such as Committee Conveners, the Council Leader, and the Provost being allocated.

== Background ==
=== Previous election ===
At the previous election in 2017, the Conservatives won the most seats on the council, but were 4 seats short of an overall majority. The SNP won the next most seats at 15, followed by the Liberal Democrats at 4, with Independents taking 3 and Labour taking 1 seat. Following the result a Conservative-Liberal Democrat coalition administration was formed. However, in September 2019, the coalition administration ended as the Conservative group voted to continue as a minority administration.

2017 Perth and Kinross election result
Party	Seats	Vote share
Conservative	17	40.9%
SNP	15	31.2%
Liberal Democrats	4	12.5%
Independent	3	6.7%
Labour	1	5.2%

=== Composition ===
There were changes to the political composition of the Council between 2017 and 2022 owing to the suspension of Councillors, defections, by-election results. Just before the election, the Scottish Conservatives had 17 Councillors, the SNP had 13 Councillors (down two compared to 2017), the Scottish Liberal Democrats had 5 (up one compared to 2017), Labour continued to have one Councillor, whilst there were four Independent or non-aligned Councillors.

Composition of Perth and Kinross Council
Party	2017 election	Dissolution
Conservative	17	17
SNP	15	13
Liberal Democrats	4	5
Independent	3	4
Labour	1	1

==== By-elections ====
Five by-elections were held between the 2017 and 2022 elections. Resignation of Conservative Councillor Michael Jamieson after being charged with possession of indecent images of children in 2017 and SNP Councillor Dave Doogan after his election as a Member of Parliament in the 2019 United Kingdom general election triggered by-elections in Perth City South and Perth City North. The deaths of Conservative Councillor Ian Campbell and SNP Councillors Bob Band and Henry Anderson also triggered by-elections in the Highland, Perth City South, and Almond and Earn wards.

Three by-elections did not change the political composition of the council. Conservative candidate Audrey Coates was elected to replace Jamieson in the first Perth City South by-election. John Duff won the Highland by-election to replace fellow Conservative Ian Campbell. The SNP's Ian Massie won the Perth City North by-election to replace Dave Doogan.

Two by-elections resulted in changes in political representation. Liz Barrett of the Scottish Liberal Democrats won the second Perth City South by-election, replacing the SNP's Bob Band. Scottish Conservative candidate Frank Smith won the final by-election of the term, replacing the SNP's Henry Anderson as a Councillor for the Almond and Earn.

By-elections during 2017-22 term
Ward	Previous Councillor		Elected Councillor	
Perth City South	Conservative	Michael Jamieson	Conservative	Audrey Coates
Highland	Conservative	Ian Campbell	Conservative	John Duff
Perth City South	SNP	Bob Band	Liberal Democrats	Liz Barrett
Perth City North	SNP	Dave Doogan	SNP	Ian Massie
Almond and Earn	SNP	Henry Anderson	Conservative	Frank Smith

==== Suspensions ====
Further changes in political composition resulted from Councillors being suspended from their political parties. Two Councillors were suspended from the Scottish Conservatives and did not rejoin the group for the remainder of the Council term. Colin Stewart and Calum Purves, representing Strathmore and Kinross-shire, were suspended in 2019 after allegations about their conduct during a meeting of the council's Integration Joint Board. Only Purves, not Stewart, was later readmitted to the Conservative group. Audrey Coates, elected in the 2017 Perth City South by-election, was also suspended from the Conservative group after being charged with drink driving in 2020.

==== Defections ====
Michael Barnacle, previously an independent councillor for Kinross-shire, joined the Scottish Conservatives in 2021, citing the prospect of a second referendum on Scottish independence and promises from the Conservative group to increase autonomy for Kinross-shire as his motivating favours.

=== Retiring Councillors ===
12 incumbent Councillors did not seek re-election. These included the outgoing Leader of the council, Conservative Councillor Murray Lyle and the longest serving Councillor, the Scottish Liberal Democrats' Willie Wilson. In total, seven Conservative Councillors, three SNP Councillors, and two Liberal Democrat Councillors did not seek re-election.

Ward	Party	Retiring councillor	First elected
Carse of Gowrie	SNP	Beth Pover	2017
Strathmore	SNP	Fiona Sarwar	2017
Strathmore	Liberal Democrats	Lewis Simpson	2003
Strathearn	Conservatives	Roz McCall	2017
Strathallan	Conservatives	Murray Lyle	2007
Strathallan	SNP	Tom Gray	2010
Kinross-shire	Conservatives	Michael Barnacle	1999
Kinross-shire	Conservatives	Callum Purves	2017
Almond and Earn	Conservatives	Kathleen Baird	2016
Perth City South	Liberal Democrats	Willie Wilson	1980
Perth City South	Independent	Audrey Coates	2017
Perth City North	Conservatives	Harry Coates	2017

1. Note 1: Table displays party affiliation at the end of the Council term. Michael Barnacle was elected as an independent but joined the Conservatives whilst Audrey Coates was suspended from the Conservatives during the term.

== Results ==
2022 Perth and Kinross Council election result
Party	Seats	Gains	Losses	Net gain/loss	Seats %	Votes %	Votes	+/−
SNP	16	1	0	▲1	40.0	36.6	22,273	▲5.4
Conservative	14	0	3	▼3	35.0	32.3	19,643	▼8.6
Liberal Democrats	4	1	1	Steady	10.0	13.1	7,961	▲0.7
Independent	4	1	0	▲1	10.0	7.2	4,399	▲0.5
Labour	2	1	0	▲1	5.0	5.6	3,432	▲0.4
Green	0	0	0	Steady	0.0	4.5	2,748	▲1.1
Scottish Family	0	0	0	Steady	0.0	0.2	148	New
Alba	0	0	0	Steady	0.0	0.2	123	New
UKIP	0	0	0	Steady	0.0	0.1	50	Steady

Note: "Votes" are the first preference votes. The net gain/loss and percentage changes relate to the result of the previous Scottish local elections on 4 May 2017. This may differ from other published sources showing gain/loss relative to seats held at dissolution of Scotland's councils.

Ward Summary
Ward	%	Cllrs	%	Cllrs	%	Cllrs	%	Cllrs	%	Cllrs	%	Cllrs	Total Cllrs
Ward	SNP		Lab		Conservative		Green		Lib Dem		Others		Total Cllrs
Carse of Gowrie	31.5	1	27.8	1	30.9	1	5.1	0	3.3	0	1.3	0	3
Strathmore	36.2	2			30.2	1	7.4	0	8.8	0	17.4	1	3
Blairgowrie and Glens	40.3	1	5.0	0	45.5	2	3.6	0	5.5	0	2.2	0	3
Highland	36.3	1	3.3	0	30.9	1	4.6	0	2.0	0	21.9	1	3
Strathtay	46.5	1			34.9	1			18.7	1			3
Strathearn	33.0	1			29.9	1			5.8	0	31.2	1	3
Strathallan	35.0	1			46.6	2	7.0	0	11.4	0			3
Kinross-shire	25.5	1	6.8	0	29.3	1	5.2	0	20.9	1	12.1	1	4
Almond and Earn	33.8	1			48.3	2	7.9	0	8.8	0	1.3	0	3
Perth City South	33.6	2	5.6	0	22.8	1	4.1	0	33.9	1			4
Perth City North	55.2	2	15.3	1	19.6	0	3.5	0	4.3	0	2.2	0	3
Perth City Centre	39.9	2	8.3	0	24.8	1	5.1	0	19.8	1	2.2	0	4

== Ward results ==
=== Carse of Gowrie (Ward 1) ===
Incumbent Councillors Alasdair Bailey (Labour) and Angus Forbes (Conservative) were re-elected. Ken Harvey (SNP) was elected for the first time. John Kellas, formerly the SNP Councillor for Strathtay, stood as a second SNP candidate but was not elected. There was no change in political representation from the 2017 election, remaining as one Labour, one Conservative, and one SNP.

Carse of Gowrie - 3 seats
Party	Candidate	FPv%	Count							
Party	Candidate	FPv%	1	2	3	4	5	6	7	8
Labour	Alasdair Bailey (incumbent)	27.8%	1,265							
Conservative	Angus Forbes (incumbent)	22.4%	1,017	1,041.4	1,054.7	1,099.1	1,139.4			
SNP	Ken Harvey	21.1%	961	980.5	983.6	996.4	1,100.3	1,100.4	1,134.1	1,652.8
SNP	John Kellas	10.4%	474	479.7	483.7	493.9	544.4	544.4	567.0	
Conservative	Mac Roberts	8.5%	388	396.5	405.7	429.4	446.9	448.9		
Green	Roger Humphry	5.1%	233	251.7	260.0	306.6				
Liberal Democrats	Lindsay Easton	3.3%	150	176.4	182.7					
Scottish Family	Don Marshall	1.3%	59	60.7						
Electorate: 8,157 Valid: 4,619 Spoilt: 72 Quota: 1,137 Turnout: 56.6%

=== Strathmore (Ward 2) ===
Perth & Kinross' Provost and incumbent Councillor Dennis Melloy was not re-elected, with party colleague Hugh Anderson elected for the first time. Colin Stewart, first elected in 2017 but subsequently suspended from the Conservatives over allegations of bullying, was elected as an independent, whilst the SNP's Grant Stewart and Jack Welch were both elected for the first time. Incumbent Liberal Democrat Councillor Lewis Simpson did not seek re-election. The Scottish National Party and Independents gained a seat compared to 2017, whilst the Liberal Democrats and Conservatives lost one.

Strathmore - 4 seats
Party	Candidate	FPv%	Count					
Party	Candidate	FPv%	1	2	3	4	5	6
SNP	Grant Stewart	26.3%	1,780					
Independent	Colin Stewart (incumbent)	17.4%	1,174	1,182.88	1,269.03	1,585.75		
Conservative	Hugh Anderson	15.3%	1,032	1,032.96	1,052.96	1,142.2	1,183.25	2,138.59
Conservative	Dennis Melloy (incumbent)	14.9%	1,009	1,011.4	1,027.64	1,107.64	1,153.79	
SNP	Jack Welch	9.9%	671	1,057.45	1,234.28	1,310.2	1,352.06	1,380.96
Liberal Democrats	Violet Iwanio	8.8%	598	600.88	756.32			
Green	Jill Belch	7.4%	500	514.15				
Electorate: 12,365 Valid: 6,764 Quota: 1,353 Turnout: 54.7%

=== Blairgowrie and Glens (Ward 3) ===
Incumbent Councillors Bob Brawn (Conservative), Tom McEwen (SNP) and Caroline Shiers (Conservative) were re-elected. There was no change in political representation from the 2017 election, remaining as two Conservative and one SNP.

Blairgowrie & Glens - 3 seats
Party	Candidate	FPv%	Count								
Party	Candidate	FPv%	1	2	3	4	5	6	7	8	9
Conservative	Caroline Shiers (incumbent)	25.78%	1,202								
SNP	Tom McEwen (incumbent)	23.62%	1,101	1,102.05	1,105.05	1,111.08	1,119.14	1,194.2			
Conservative	Bob Brawn (incumbent)	19.69%	918	949.24	961.36	974.45	1,008.84	1,023.9	1,024.54	1,089.69	1,244.5
SNP	Harry Macfadyen	16.65%	776	776.33	778.33	780.33	785.36	811.39	835.72	889.02	
Labour	Pauline Hunter	4.98%	232	232.42	234.42	241.42	300.66	341.69	342.57		
Green	Louise Ramsay	3.62%	169	169.33	175.33	187.39	214.48				
Liberal Democrats	Gordon Clark	3.50%	163	164.02	168.02	178.02					
Independent	Bernard Noonan	1.37%	64	64.27	65.27						
Scottish Family	Jack Murphy	0.79%	37	37.18							
Electorate: 9,188 Valid: 4,662 Quota: 1,166 Turnout: 52.2%

=== Highland (Ward 4) ===
Incumbent Councillors John Duff (Conservative), Xander McDade (Independent) and Michael Williamson (SNP) were re-elected. There was no change in political representation from the 2017 election, remaining as one Conservative, one Independent and one SNP.

Highland - 3 seats
Party	Candidate	FPv%	Count							
Party	Candidate	FPv%	1	2	3	4	5	6	7	8
Conservative	John Duff (incumbent)	24.92%	1,110	1,120						
Independent	Xander McDade (incumbent)	21.93%	977	1,009	1,010.1	1,076.15	1,148.16			
SNP	Michael Williamson (incumbent)	19.21%	856	857	857.16	865.16	908.16	914.89	930.38	1,740.42
SNP	Sally Murray	18.11%	807	811	811.15	829.16	899.17	905.09	916.98	
Conservative	Rhona Metcalf	6.02%	268	275	279	283.03	291.06	297.86		
Green	Mary McDougall	4.56%	203	212	212.1	247.11				
Labour	Paula Hunter	3.30%	147	166	166.18					
Liberal Democrats	Barry McMahon	1.95%	87							
Electorate: 7,674 Valid: 4,455 Quota: 1,114 Turnout: 58.8%

=== Strathtay (Ward 5) ===
Incumbent Councillors Ian James (Conservative) and Grant Laing (SNP) were re-elected. Claire McLaren (Liberal Democrats) was elected for the first time and incumbent Councillor Anne Jarvis (Conservative) was not re-elected. Liberal Democrats gained the seat from the conservatives. 2022 political representation is now one Conservative, one SNP and one Liberal Democrat.

Strathtay - 3 seats
Party	Candidate	FPv%	Count				
Party	Candidate	FPv%	1	2	3	4	5
SNP	Grant Laing (incumbent)	25.74%	1,328				
SNP	Melanie Kinney	20.72%	1,069	1,101.19	1,107.33	1,114.84	
Conservative	Ian James (incumbent)	18.84%	972	972.4	1,698.57		
Liberal Democrats	Claire McLaren	18.65%	962	964.92	1,020.06	1,231.26	1,821.09
Conservative	Anne Jarvis (incumbent)	16.05%	828	828.54			
Electorate: 9,890 Valid: 5,159 Quota: 1,290 Turnout: 53.3%

=== Strathearn (Ward 6) ===
Incumbent Councillors Rhona Brock (Independent) and Stewart Donaldson (SNP) were re-elected. Unlike 2017, the Conservatives only stood one candidate and their candidate, Noah Khogali, was elected for the first time and is the youngest representative on the Council. There was no change in political representation from the 2017 election, remaining as one Independent, one SNP and one Conservative.

Strathearn - 3 seats
Party	Candidate	FPv%	Count			
Party	Candidate	FPv%	1	2	3	4
Conservative	Noah Khogali	29.94%	1,337			
Independent	Rhona Brock (incumbent)	27.41%	1,224			
SNP	Stewart Donaldson (incumbent)	24.23%	1,082	1,086.77	1,104.95	1,137.27
SNP	David West	8.76%	391	393.14	396.72	402.83
Liberal Democrats	Julia Brown	5.84%	261	327.47	354.92	452.71
Independent	Roger Cartwright	3.83%	171	237.97	276.17	
Electorate: 8,672 Valid: 4,466 Quota: 1,117 Turnout: 52.4%

=== Strathallan (Ward 7) ===
Council leader Murray Lyle (Conservative) and Tom Gray (SNP) stood down at this election. Incumbent Councillor Crawford Reid (Conservative) was re-elected. Keith Allen (Conservative) and Steven Carr (SNP) were elected for the first time. There was no change in political representation from the 2017 election, remaining two Conservatives and one SNP.

Strathallan - 3 seats
Party	Candidate	FPv%	Count			
Party	Candidate	FPv%	1	2	3	4
Conservative	Keith Allen	29.68%	1,420			
SNP	Steven Carr	21.90%	1,048	1,053.18	1,121.65	1,205.12
Conservative	Crawford Reid (incumbent)	16.97%	812	1,002.65	1,017.43	1,205.42
SNP	Catherine Scott	13.06%	625	626.41	720.57	821.88
Liberal Democrats	Neil Gaunt	11.43%	547	562.39	686.02	
Green	Andrew Lear	6.96%	333	335.67		
Electorate: 9,543 Valid: 4,785 Quota: 1,197 Turnout: 51.5%

=== Kinross-Shire (Ward 8) ===
Incumbent Councillors Callum Purves (Conservative) and Mike Barnacle (Independent/Conservative) stood down at this election. Incumbent Councillors Willie Robertson (Liberal Democrats) and Richard Watters (SNP) were re-elected. Neil Freshwater (Conservative) was elected for the first time. Former Councillor Dave Cuthbert (Independent) is back representing Kinross-shire after being elected. There was no change in political representation from the 2017 election, remaining one SNP, one Liberal Democrat, one Conservative and one Independent.

Kinross-shire - 4 seats
Party	Candidate	FPv%	Count						
Party	Candidate	FPv%	1	2	3	4	5	6	7
SNP	Richard Watters (incumbent)	25.47%	1,638						
Liberal Democrats	Willie Robertson (incumbent)	20.93%	1,346						
Conservative	Neil Freshwater	14.88%	957	960.36	964.83	972.05	1,011.17	1,029.04	1,876.66
Conservative	George Stirling	14.38%	925	932.38	940.8	948.93	972.28	986.49	
Independent	Dave Cuthbert	11.27%	725	778.48	799.65	816.81	964.15	1,251.98	1,302.66
Labour	Graham Cox	6.81%	438	487	496.65	504.18			
Green	Pat Doran	5.15%	331	517.84	525.9	532	658.81		
Scottish Family	Gerald O'Connell	0.81%	52	58.04	58.66				
Electorate: 11,806 Valid: 6,432 Quota: 1,287 Turnout: 55.1%

=== Almond and Earn (Ward 9) ===
Deputy Provost and incumbent Councillor Kathleen Baird (Conservative) stood down at this election. Incumbent Councillors David Illingworth (Conservative) and Frank Smith (Conservative) were re-elected. Unlike 2017, the SNP only stood one candidate and Michelle Frampton was elected for the first time. There was no change in political representation from the 2017 election, remaining two Conservatives and one SNP.

Almond & Earn - 3 seats
Party	Candidate	FPv%	Count				
Party	Candidate	FPv%	1	2	3	4	5
SNP	Michelle Frampton	33.81%	1,339				
Conservative	David Illingworth (incumbent)	27.93%	1,106				
Conservative	Frank Smith (incumbent)	20.35%	806	817.44	916.73	933.271	1,035.53
Liberal Democrats	Tina Ng-A-Mann	8.76%	347	397.94	404.7	424.22	
Green	Paul Vallot	7.88%	312	503.28	505.15	521.61	683.39
UKIP	Lynda Davis	1.26%	50	63.77	64.71		
Electorate: 7,985 Valid: 3,960 Quota: 991 Turnout: 50.2%

=== Perth City South (Ward 10) ===
Incumbent Councillors Liz Barrett (Liberal Democrats) and Sheila McCole (SNP) were re-elected. Andy Chan (Conservative) and Iain Macpherson (SNP) were elected for the first time. There was no change in political representation from the 2017 election, remaining two SNP, one Liberal Democrat and one Conservative.

Perth City South - 4 seats
Party	Candidate	FPv%	Count						
Party	Candidate	FPv%	1	2	3	4	5	6	7
Liberal Democrats	Liz Barrett (incumbent)	33.88%	2,315						
SNP	Iain Macpherson	20.15%	1,377						
Conservative	Andy Chan	16.84%	1,151	1,419.22					
SNP	Sheila McCole (incumbent)	13.49%	922	1,044.85	1,046.23	1,055.39	1,243.90	1,257.02	1,489.86
Conservative	Calum Milne	5.91%	404	483.85	524.41	524.44	542.62		
Labour	Kirsten Roper	5.63%	385	547.57	550.3	550.5	652.11	795.49	
Green	Elspeth McLachlan	4.08%	279	411.27	412.53	412.86			
Electorate: 13,427 Valid: 6,833 Quota: 1,367 Turnout: 51.6%

=== Perth City North (Ward 11) ===
Incumbent Councillors Ian Massie (SNP) and John Rebbeck (SNP) were re-elected. Incumbent Councillor Harry Coates (Conservative) stood down at this election and Brian Leishman (Labour) won the 3rd seat over the conservative candidate, Aziz Rehman. The political representation is now two SNP and one Labour.

Perth City North - 3 seats
Party	Candidate	FPv%	Count						
Party	Candidate	FPv%	1	2	3	4	5	6	7
SNP	Ian Massie (incumbent)	32.66%	1,129						
SNP	John Rebbeck (incumbent)	22.53%	779	997.63					
Conservative	Aziz Rehman	19.58%	677	678.17	680.22	685.32	715.45	733.13	
Labour	Brian Leishman	15.33%	530	539.12	560.19	570.98	639.01	735.77	1,091.10
Liberal Democrats	James Graham	4.25%	147	148.40	156.76	170.05			
Green	Ronnie McNeil	3.47%	120	131.93	170.87	198.72	228.03		
Alba	Alan Black	2.17%	75	79.21	94.65				
Electorate: 9,041 Valid: 3,457 Quota: 865 Turnout: 39.3%

=== Perth City Centre (Ward 12) ===
Incumbent Councillors Chris Ahern (Conservative), Peter Barrett (Liberal Democrats), Eric Drysdale (SNP) and Andrew Parrott (SNP) were all re-elected. There was no change in political representation from the 2017 election, remaining two SNP, one Conservative and one Liberal Democrat.

Perth City Centre - 4 seats
Party	Candidate	FPv%	Count							
Party	Candidate	FPv%	1	2	3	4	5	6	7	8
SNP	Eric Drysdale (incumbent)	27.49%	1,445							
Liberal Democrats	Peter Barrett (incumbent)	19.75%	1,038	1,051.6	1,056.41					
Conservative	Chris Ahern (incumbent)	19.12%	1,005	1,008.26	1,009.26	1,010.19	1,026.22	1,037.52	1,042.48	1,328
SNP	Andrew Parrott (incumbent)	12.46%	655	979.46	1,006.45	1,007.02	1,013.84	1,174.36		
Labour	Scott Forsyth	8.28%	435	449.41	453.96	454.96	472.29	543.09	576.67	581.87
Conservative	Nick Tulloch	5.69%	299	299.54	299.54	299.87	305.89	312.92	314.49	
Green	Susannah Rae	5.10%	268	282.41	284.96	285.51	294.35			
Independent	Ian Thomson	1.28%	64	66.45	74.45	74.71				
Alba	Sandy Miller	0.91%	48	53.71						
Electorate: 12,856 Valid: 5,257 Quota: 1,052 Turnout: 41.8%

== Aftermath ==
=== September 2024 by-elections ===
Conservative councillor Crawford Reid resigned as a councillor in July 2024 after being asked to return to work in the NHS. This was followed by Labour councillor Brian Leishman resigning as a councillor in August 2024 after being elected as the Member of Parliament for the Alloa and Grangemouth constituency at the 2024 General Election. The resulting by-elections were held on 26 September 2024 and Liberal Democrat candidate, Alan Watt won the Strathallan by-election, while SNP candidate Carol Mair won the Perth City North by-election.

Strathallan by-election (26 September 2024) - 1 seat
Party	Candidate	FPv%	Count					
Party	Candidate	FPv%	1	2	3	4	5	6
Conservative	Amanda Runciman	32.1	1,045	1,049	1,123	1,169	1,206	
Liberal Democrats	Alan Watt	30.0	978	1,006	1,035	1,213	1,509	2,110
SNP	Catherine Scott	17.4	568	613	626	696		
Labour	Ken McCracken	11.2	366	382	388			
Reform	Ian Thomas	6.0	194	198				
Green	Nettie Sutherland	3.3	107					
Electorate: 9,657 Quota: 1,630 Turnout: 34.0%

Perth City North by-election (26 September 2024) - 1 seat
Party	Candidate	FPv%	Count				
Party	Candidate	FPv%	1	2	3	4	5
SNP	Carol Mair	44.7	917	946	961	1,015	1,058
Labour	Kirsten Nkwocha-Dyer	15.3	313	331	358	374	409
Conservative	Aziz Rehman	14.4	296	297	316	323	365
Reform	Sonia Davidson	10.2	209	213	220	234	
Alba	Robert Reid	6.5	133	139	145		
Liberal Democrats	Tina Ng-a-Mann	4.6	95	111			
Green	Caitlin Ripley	4.2	87				
Electorate: 9,128 Quota: 1,050 Turnout: 22.7%
