= 2012 Perth and Kinross Council election =

2012 Scottish local government election

- 3 May 2012

All 41 seats to Perth and Kinross Council 21 seats needed for a majority
	First party	Second party	Third party
Leader	Ian Miller	Mac Roberts	Peter Barrett
Party	SNP	Conservative	Liberal Democrats
Leader's seat	Strathmore	Carse of Gowrie	Perth City Centre
Last election	18 seats, 43.9%	12 seats, 29.3%	8 seats, 19.5%
Seats before	18	13	7
Seats won	18	10	5
Seat change	Steady	▼2	▼3
	Fourth party	Fifth party
Leader	Archie MacLellan	Mike Barnacle	Rhona Brock
Party	Labour	Independent
Leader's seat	Perth City Centre	Kinross-shire	Strathearn
Last election	3 seats, 7.3%	0 seats, 0%	0 seat, 0%
Seats before	3	1	0
Seats after	4	3	1
Seat change	▲1	▲3	▲1
Council Leader before election
Ian Miller
SNP
Council Leader after election
Ian Miller
SNP

The 2012 Perth and Kinross Council election was held on 3 May 2012, the same day as the other Scottish local government elections. The election used the twelve wards created as a result of the Local Governance (Scotland) Act 2004, with each ward electing three or four councillors using the single transferable vote system form of proportional representation, with 41 Councillors being elected.

The council was previously controlled by a Liberal Democrat/Scottish National Party coalition administration from 2007 to 2012.

The 2012 elections saw the SNP remain the main party by a significant margin but they did not make further advances. Both the Conservatives and the Liberal Democrats lost seats to Independents who returned to the Council having been wiped out in 2007. Following the election a Scottish National Party minority administration took over the running of the council with the support of the Scottish Conservative and Unionist Party.

== Results ==
2012 Perth and Kinross Council election result
Party	Seats	Gains	Losses	Net gain/loss	Seats %	Votes %	Votes	+/−
SNP	18	0	0	Steady	43.9	40.3	19,119	▲3.1
Conservative	10	0	2	▼2	24.4	25.2	11,941	▼2.9
Liberal Democrats	5	0	3	▼3	12.2	12.7	6,033	▼7.0
Labour	4	1	0	▲1	9.8	11.9	5,619	▲3.4
Independent	3	3	0	▲3	7.3	7.3	3,458	▲2.5
Perth Independent Candidates Party	1	1	0	▲1	2.4	1.7	805	New
Green	0	0	0	Steady	0.0	1.0	456	▼0.7

Note: "Votes" are the first preference votes. The net gain/loss and percentage changes relate to the result of the previous Scottish local elections on 3 May 2007. This may differ from other published sources showing gain/loss relative to seats held at dissolution of Scotland's councils.

== Ward results ==
=== Carse of Gowrie ===
- 2007: 2xSNP; 1xCon
- 2012: 2xSNP; 1xCon
- 2007-2012 Change: No change

Carse of Gowrie – 3 seats
Party	Candidate	FPv%	Count			
Party	Candidate	FPv%	1	2	3	4
Conservative	Mac Roberts (incumbent)	32.45%	1,045			
SNP	Gordon Walker	23.45%	755	778	801	928
SNP	Douglas Pover	23.32%	751	769	796	925
Labour	Lorna Redford	15.31%	493	527	639	
Liberal Democrats	Tina Ng-A-Mann	5.47%	176	247		
Electorate: - Valid: 3,220 Spoilt: 47 Quota: 806 Turnout: 3,267 (%)

=== Strathmore ===
- 2007: 2xSNP; 1xCon; 1xLib Dem
- 2012: 2xSNP; 1xCon; 1xLib Dem
- 2007-2012 Change: No change

Strathmore – 4 seats
Party	Candidate	FPv%	Count
Party	Candidate	FPv%	1
Conservative	Dennis Melloy (incumbent)	23.66%	1,252
SNP	Alan Grant (incumbent)	21.11%	1,117
SNP	Ian Miller (incumbent)	20.56%	1,088
Liberal Democrats	Lewis Simpson (incumbent)	20.43%	1,081
Labour	Jamie Glackin	6.09%	322
Independent	Michael Gallagher	5.35%	283
Green	Louise Ramsay	2.80%	148
Electorate: - Valid: 5,291 Spoilt: 81 Quota: 1,059 Turnout: 5,372 (%)

=== Blairgowrie and Glens ===
- 2007: 2xSNP; 1xCon
- 2012: 2xSNP; 1xCon
- 2007-2012 Change: No change

Blairgowrie and Glens – 3 seats
Party	Candidate	FPv%	Count	
Party	Candidate	FPv%	1	2
SNP	Bob Ellis (incumbent)	34.11%	1,340	
Conservative	Caroline Shiers (incumbent)	33.49%	1,316	
SNP	Liz Grant (incumbent)	21.48%	844	1,152
Labour	Grant Wallace	8.20%	322	333
Liberal Democrats	Sanjay Samani	2.72%	107	114
Electorate: - Valid: 3,929 Spoilt: 66 Quota: 983 Turnout: 3,995 (%)

=== Highland ===
- 2007: 2xSNP; 1xCon
- 2012: 2xSNP; 1xCon
- 2007-2012 Change: No change

Highland – 3 seats
Party	Candidate	FPv%	Count					
Party	Candidate	FPv%	1	2	3	4	5	6
SNP	Katie Howie (incumbent)	33.09%	1,141					
Conservative	Ian Campbell (incumbent)	23.93%	825	839	849	902		
SNP	Mike Williamson (incumbent)	15.28%	527	727	742	776	780	879
Independent	Xander McDade	9.08%	313	334	368	410	418	559
Independent	William Leszke	8.29%	286	292	310	370	378	
Liberal Democrats	Victor Clements	6.24%	215	227	250			
Labour	Lorna Ferguson	4.09%	141	147				
Electorate: - Valid: 3,448 Spoilt: 52 Quota: 863 Turnout: 3,500 (%)

=== Strathtay ===
- 2007: 2xSNP; 1xCon
- 2012: 2xSNP; 1xCon
- 2007-2012 Change: No change

Strathtay – 3 seats
Party	Candidate	FPv%	Count
Party	Candidate	FPv%	1
Conservative	Barbara Vaughan (incumbent)	31.44%	1,003
SNP	John Kellas (incumbent)	28.78%	918
SNP	Grant Laing	25.77%	822
Labour	Anne Chatt	9.50%	303
Liberal Democrats	Neil Henry Gaunt	4.51%	144
Electorate: - Valid: 3,190 Spoilt: 31 Quota: 798 Turnout: 3,221 (%)

=== Strathearn ===
- 2007: 2xCon; 1xSNP
- 2012: 1xSNP; 1xCon; 1xPICP
- 2007-2012 Change: PICP gain one seat from Con

Strathearn – 3 seats
Party	Candidate	FPv%	Count			
Party	Candidate	FPv%	1	2	3	4
SNP	Anne Younger (incumbent)	30.82%	1,137			
Conservative	Ann Cowan (incumbent)	23.69%	874	889	910	946
Perth Independent Candidates Party	Rhona Brock	18.27%	674	742	779	939
Conservative	Bob Ferguson	15.59%	575	588	599	640
Labour	Alastair McLean	8.76%	323	356	389	
Liberal Democrats	Kenneth Robertson Spittal	2.87%	106	125		
Electorate: - Valid: 3,689 Spoilt: 30 Quota: 923 Turnout: 3,719 (%)

=== Strathallan ===
- 2007: 1xSNP; 1xCon; 1xLib Dem
- 2012: 1xCon; 1xSNP; 1xLib Dem
- 2007-2012 Change: No change

Strathallan – 3 seats
Party	Candidate	FPv%	Count			
Party	Candidate	FPv%	1	2	3	4
Conservative	Murray Lyle (incumbent)	34.02%	1,064			
SNP	Tom Gray (incumbent)	24.62%	770	790		
Liberal Democrats	Ann Gaunt (incumbent)	17.99%	563	700	701	852
SNP	Brian Sculthorp	13.40%	419	426	432	481
Labour	Dave MacLurg	9.97%	312	327	328	
Electorate: - Valid: 3,128 Spoilt: 46 Quota: 783 Turnout: 3,174 (%)

=== Kinross-shire ===
- 2007: 2xLib Dem; 1xSNP; 1xCon
- 2012: 2xIndependent; 1xLib Dem; 1xSNP
- 2007-2012 Change: Independent gain from Lib Dem and Con

Kinross-shire – 4 seats
Party	Candidate	FPv%	Count							
Party	Candidate	FPv%	1	2	3	4	5	6	7	8
Independent	Dave Cuthbert	19.31%	897	905	915	964				
Independent	Mike Barnacle (incumbent)	17.27%	802	819	828	859	871	905	924	930
Liberal Democrats	Willie Robertson (incumbent)	16.99%	789	807	857	902	910	947		
Conservative	Kathleen Baird (incumbent)	14.98%	696	701	707	723	726	733	739	743
SNP	Joe Giacopazzi	14.04%	652	658	664	685	689	1,009		
SNP	Sandy Miller (incumbent)	8.45%	411	417	418	434	436			
Labour	Simon Edwin Bramwell	4.95%	230	241	246					
Liberal Democrats	Russell Auld	1.87%	87	91						
Green	Donald Fraser	1.74%	81							
Electorate: - Valid: 4,645 Spoilt: 37 Quota: 930 Turnout: 4,682 (%)

=== Almond and Earn ===
- 2007: 1xSNP; 1xCon; 1xLib Dem
- 2012: 1xCon; 1xSNP; 1xIndependent
- 2007-2012 Change: Independent gain from Lib Dem

Almond and Earn – 3 seats
Party	Candidate	FPv%	Count					
Party	Candidate	FPv%	1	2	3	4	5	6
Conservative	Alan Livingstone	30.14%	1,112					
SNP	Henry Anderson	24.18%	892	901	923			
SNP	Wilma Lumsden (incumbent)	17.02%	628	640	670	671	756	
Independent	Alan Jack (incumbent)††	12.04%	444	493	597	597	771	987
Labour	Andrew Dundas	10.0%	369	381	451	451		
Liberal Democrats	George Hayton (incumbent)	6.61%	244	284				
Electorate: - Valid: 3,689 Spoilt: 36 Quota: 923 Turnout: 3,725 (%)

=== Perth City South ===
- 2007: 2xLib Dem; 1xCon; 1xSNP
- 2012: 1xLib Dem; 1xCon; 1xSNP; 1xLab
- 2007-2012 Change: Lab gain from Lib Dem

Perth City South – 4 seats
Party	Candidate	FPv%	Count							
Party	Candidate	FPv%	1	2	3	4	5	6	7	8
Liberal Democrats	William Wilson (incumbent)	25.70%	1,288							
Conservative	Alexander Stewart (incumbent)	21.27%	1,066							
SNP	Bob Band (incumbent)	18.18%	911	936	938	957	998	1,468		
Labour	Alistair Munro	11.02%	552	568	572	605	669	694	757	937
SNP	Murray Duncan	9.4%	471	486	488	511	546			
Liberal Democrats	Lorraine Caddell (incumbent)	5.73%	287	453	467	489	558	568	657	
Green	Alice Walsh	4.53%	227	237						
Independent	Iona MacGregor	4.17%	209	221	231					
Electorate: - Valid: 5,011 Spoilt: 46 Quota: 1,003 Turnout: 5,057 (%)

=== Perth City North ===
- 2007: 2xSNP; 2xLab
- 2012: 2xSNP; 2xLab
- 2007-2012 Change: No change

Perth City North – 4 seats
Party	Candidate	FPv%	Count						
Party	Candidate	FPv%	1	2	3	4	5	6	7
SNP	Dave Doogan	31.35%	1,239						
Labour	John Flynn (incumbent)	23.10%	913						
SNP	Elspeth Maclachlan (incumbent)	14.88%	588	690	693	707	1,115		
Labour	Calum Gillies (incumbent)	13.31%	526	554	658	692	706	767	908
Conservative	Yvonne Clark	10.37%	410	414	416	457	460	472	
SNP	Liam Hannan	3.80%	150	432	435	451			
Liberal Democrats	Philip Brown	3.19%	126	131	133				
Electorate: - Valid: 3,952 Spoilt: 100 Quota: 791 Turnout: 4,052 (%)

=== Perth City Centre ===
- 2007: 1xSNP; 1xLib Dem; 1xCon; 1xLab
- 2012: 1xSNP; 1xLib Dem; 1xLab; 1xCon
- 2007-2012 Change: No change

Perth City Centre – 4 seats
Party	Candidate	FPv%	Count						
Party	Candidate	FPv%	1	2	3	4	5	6	7
SNP	Jack Coburn (incumbent)†	21.77%	923						
Liberal Democrats	Peter Barrett (incumbent)	21.09%	894						
Labour	Archie MacLellan (incumbent)	17.43%	739	742	751	751	778	834	1,038
SNP	Andy Hay	14.74%	625	691	697	698	716	749	
Conservative	Heather Stewart (incumbent)	16.58%	703	704	716	719	729	792	837
Independent	Nathan Shields	5.28%	224	225	230	241	279		
Perth Independent Candidates Party	Ian Thomson	2.62%	111	112	114	119			
Perth Independent Candidates Party	Mahesh Rednam	0.47%	20	20	21				
Electorate: - Valid: 4,239 Spoilt: 74 Quota: 848 Turnout: 4,315 (%)

== Post Election Changes ==
- † On 24 March 2015 Perth City Centre SNP Cllr Jack Coburn announced he was standing down from the council for health reasons.By-election date confirmed – Perth & Kinross Council. A by-election was held to fill the vacancy on 7 May 2015 and the seat was retained by the SNP's Andrew Parrott.
- †† On 31 January 2016 Almond and Earn Independent Cllr Alan Jack died after a short illness.Tributes paid to 'Mr Bridge of Earn' councillor Alan Jack A by-election was held on 7 April 2016 and the seat was won by the Conservative's Kathleen Baird.

== By-Elections since 2012 ==
Perth City Centre By-election (7 May 2015) - 1 Seat
Party	Candidate	FPv%	Count
Party	Candidate	FPv%	1
SNP	Andrew Parrott	51.07	3,589
Conservative	Chris Ahern	23.89	1,679
Labour	Lorna Redford	13.36	939
Liberal Democrats	Philip Brown	9.98	701
Independent	Ian Thomson	1.69	119
Electorate: 11,160 Valid: 7,027 Spoilt: 104 Quota: 3,515 Turnout: 7,131 (63.94%)

Almond and Earn By-election (7 April 2016) - 1 Seat
Party	Candidate	FPv%	Count		
Party	Candidate	FPv%	1	2	3
Conservative	Kathleen Baird	48.5%	1,651	1,681	1,720
SNP	Wilma Lumsden	38.4%	1,327	1,334	1,370
Labour	Dave MacKenzie	6.3%	219	228	280
Liberal Democrats	George Hayton	4.5%	157	163	
UKIP	Denise Baykal	2.2%	77		
Electorate: 8,772 Valid: 3,431 Spoilt: 19 Quota: 1,716 Turnout: 3,450 (39.33%)
