= 2007 Perth and Kinross Council election =

2007 Scottish local government election

- 3 May 2007

All 41 seats to Perth and Kinross Council 21 seats needed for a majority
	First party	Second party
Party	SNP	Conservative
Last election	15 seats, 36.1%	10 seats, 28.1%
Seats before	15	10
Seats won	18	12
Seat change	▲3	▲2
Popular vote	23,254	17,556
Percentage	37.2%	28.1%
Swing	▲1.1%	Steady
	Third party	Fourth party
Party	Liberal Democrats	Labour
Last election	9 seats, 22.1%	5 seats, 9.7%
Seats before	9	5
Seats won	8	3
Seat change	▼1	▼2
Popular vote	12,203	5,311
Percentage	19.7%	8.5%
Swing	▼2.4%	▼1.2%
Council Leader before election
SNP
Council Leader after election
SNP

The 2007 Perth and Kinross Council election was held on 3 May 2007, the same day as the other Scottish local government elections and the Scottish Parliament general election. The election was the first one using 12 new wards created as a result of the Local Governance (Scotland) Act 2004, each ward will elect three or four councillors using the single transferable vote system form of proportional representation. The new wards replace 41 single-member wards which used the plurality (first past the post) system of election.

The Council continued to be controlled by a Liberal Democrat/Scottish National Party coalition administration.

== Results ==
2007 Perth and Kinross Council election result
Party	Seats	Gains	Losses	Net gain/loss	Seats %	Votes %	Votes	+/−
SNP	18	-	-	▲3	43.9	37.2	23,254	▲1.1
Conservative	12	-	-	▲2	29.3	28.1	17,556	Steady
Liberal Democrats	8	-	-	▼1	19.5	19.7	12,303	▼2.4
Labour	3	-	-	▼2	7.3	8.5	5,311	▼1.2
Green	0	-	-	Steady	0.0	1.7	1,094	New
Independent	0	-	-	▼2	0.0	4.8	3,020	▲0.9

== Ward results ==
=== Carse of Gowrie ===
Perth and Kinross council election, 2007: Carse of Gowrie
Party	Candidate	FPv%	Count				
Party	Candidate	FPv%	1	2	3	4	5
Conservative	Mac Roberts	28.6	1,192				
SNP	John Hulbert	25.8	1,075				
SNP	Peter Mulheron	20.7	862	882	905	975	1,353
Liberal Democrats	Catherine Carruthers	17.2	715	757	759	917	
Independent	Richard Rattray	7.8	323	355	356		
Electorate: 6,775 Valid: 4,167 Spoilt: 80 Quota: 1,042 Turnout: 62.69%

=== Strathmore ===
Perth and Kinross council election, 2007: Strathmore
Party	Candidate	FPv%	Count							
Party	Candidate	FPv%	1	2	3	4	5	6	7	8
Conservative	Dennis Melloy	24.9	1,764							
Liberal Democrats	Lewis Simpson	19.6	1,390	1,444						
SNP	Alan Grant	15.0	1,066	1,087	1,088	1,103	1,147	1,262	1,365	1,651
SNP	Ian Miller	14.1	1,003	1,030	1,031	1,039	1,091	1,117	1,164	1,378
SNP	Stan McMillan	8.7	620	628	634	654	676	697	744	
Labour	Lorna Ferguson	6.6	470	483	486	506	553	606		
Independent	Michael Gallagher	4.3	308	334	335	401	449			
Green	Louise Ramsay	4.0	285	317	321	337				
Independent	Hugh Anderson	2.7	190	224	227					
Electorate: 11,504 Valid: 7,096 Spoilt: 125 Quota: 1,420 Turnout: 62.77%

=== Blairgowrie and Glens ===
Perth and Kinross council election, 2007: Blairgowrie and Glens
Party	Candidate	FPv%	Count	
Party	Candidate	FPv%	1	2
SNP	Bob Ellis	33.8	1,680	
Conservative	Caroline Shiers	28.9	1,435	
SNP	Liz Grant	20.9	1,038	1,379
Liberal Democrats	Alison Taylor	9.2	459	487
Labour	Roy Cameron	7.2	357	371
Electorate: 8,319 Valid: 4,969 Spoilt: 112 Quota: 1,243 Turnout: 61.08%

=== Highland ===
Perth and Kinross council election, 2007: Highland
Party	Candidate	FPv%	Count
Party	Candidate	FPv%	1
SNP	Eleanor Howie	32.9	1,489
Conservative	Ian Campbell	25.6	1,158
SNP	Ken Lyall	25.4	1,150
Liberal Democrats	Danus Skene	13.5	609
Independent	Ron Rose	2.5	115
Electorate: 7,312 Valid: 4,531 Spoilt: 96 Quota: 1,131 Turnout: 63.14%

=== Strathtay ===
Perth and Kinross council election, 2007: Strathtay
Party	Candidate	FPv%	Count			
Party	Candidate	FPv%	1	2	3	4
Conservative	Barbara Vaughan	32.7	1,400			
SNP	John Kellas	32.6	1,398			
Liberal Democrats	Alan Livingstone	17.4	747	892	930	
SNP	Alisdair Wylie	17.3	742	782	1,020	1,441
Electorate: 6,998 Valid: 4,287 Spoilt: 80 Quota: 1,072 Turnout: 62.40%

=== Strathearn ===
Perth and Kinross council election, 2007: Strathearn
Party	Candidate	FPv%	Count					
Party	Candidate	FPv%	1	2	3	4	5	6
SNP	Anne Younger	25.18	1,210					
Conservative	Ann Cowan	23.80	1,144	1,145	1,200	1,329		
Conservative	Helen McDonald	18.39	884	885	935	998	1,094	1,500
Independent	Rhona Brock	13.28	638	640	723	985	996	
Liberal Democrats	Russell Auld	13.21	635	637	671			
Independent	Colin Crabbie	6.14	295	296				
Electorate: 8,102 Valid: 4,806 Spoilt: 101 Quota: 1,202 Turnout: 60.58%

=== Strathallan ===
Perth and Kinross council election, 2007: Strathallan
Party	Candidate	FPv%	Count							
Party	Candidate	FPv%	1	2	3	4	5	6	7	8
SNP	John Law	25.2	1,163							
Conservative	Murray Lyle	15.6	842	845	847	870	897	1,379		
Conservative	John Wilson	14.8	666	667	673	683	696			
Independent	Colin Young	13.5	609	611	636	658	697	773	882	
Liberal Democrats	Ann Gaunt	12.0	541	548	556	654	830	883	941	1,229
Labour	Anne Chatt	8.9	402	405	405	439				
Green	Hilary Halley	5.0	225	231	234					
Independent	Jock Stewart	1.2	53	55						
Electorate: 7,586 Valid: 4,501 Spoilt: 55 Quota: 1,126 Turnout: 60.06%

=== Kinross-shire ===
Perth and Kinross council election, 2007: Kinross-shire
Party	Candidate	FPv%	Count				
Party	Candidate	FPv%	1	2	3	4	5
SNP	Sandy Miller	25.0	1,445				
Liberal Democrats	Willie Robertson	22.7	1,314				
Conservative	Kathleen Baird	21.0	1,217				
Liberal Democrats	Michael Barnacle	16.3	942	1,010	1,094	1,115	1,242
Labour	Kate Milliken	11.2	650	692	713	717	774
Green	Andrew Thompson	3.7	216	278	295	302	
Electorate: 9,664 Valid: 49 Spoilt: 5,784 Quota: 1,157 Turnout: 60.36%

=== Almond and Earn ===
Perth and Kinross council election, 2007: Almond and Earn
Party	Candidate	FPv%	Count			
Party	Candidate	FPv%	1	2	3	4
SNP	Wilma Lumsden	36.6	1,790			
Conservative	Alan Jack	30.2	1,477			
Liberal Democrats	George Hayton	17.3	849	1,078	1,120	1,610
Conservative	Pamella Roberts	15.9	778	853	1,017	
Electorate: 7,995 Valid: 4,894 Spoilt: 79 Quota: 1,224 Turnout: 62.20%

=== Perth City South ===
Perth and Kinross council election, 2007: Perth City South
Party	Candidate	FPv%	Count						
Party	Candidate	FPv%	1	2	3	4	5	6	7
Liberal Democrats	Willie Wilson	29.8	1,789						
Conservative	Alexander Stewart	29.4	1,768						
SNP	Robert Band	17.2	1,033	1,063	1,087	1,122	1,564		
Labour	Jock Munro	13.3	796	836	881	916	938	968	
Liberal Democrats	Lorraine Caddell	10.3	618	867	991	1,049	1,085	1,156	1,573
SNP	Andrew Gadsden	8.1	485	513	532	564			
Independent	Keith Mothersson	3.2	191	201	222				
Electorate: 10,914 Valid: 6,680 Spoilt: 80 Quota: 1,337 Turnout: 61.94%

=== Perth City North ===
Perth and Kinross council election, 2007: Perth City North
Party	Candidate	FPv%	Count						
Party	Candidate	FPv%	1	2	3	4	5	6	7
SNP	Elspeth Maclachlan	23.5	1,217						
SNP	Dave Scott	19.3	1,001	1,127					
Labour	John Flynn	18.5	958	964	975	991	1,146		
Conservative	Douglas Gratty	13.4	694	698	703	725	842	847	
Labour	Calum Gillies	12.8	666	675	684	697	785	867	1,115
Liberal Democrats	Philip Brown	10.1	523	529	541	593			
Green	Adam Ramsay	2.5	130	135	147				
Electorate: 11,189 Valid: 5,189 Spoilt: 153 Quota: 1,038 Turnout: 47.74%

=== Perth City Centre ===
Perth and Kinross council election, 2007: Perth City Centre
Party	Candidate	FPv%	Count					
Party	Candidate	FPv%	1	2	3	4	5	6
SNP	Jack Coburn	23.0	1,299					
Liberal Democrats	Peter Barrett	20.8	1,172					
Conservative	Heather Stewart	20.1	1,137					
Labour	Archie MacLellan	17.9	1,012	1,024	1,032	1,034	1,104	1,201
SNP	Gordon Hunter	8.6	488	598	604	604	664	745
Independent	Ian Thomson	5.3	298	305	312	313	364	
Green	Jack Cockin	4.2	238	249	258	259		
Electorate: 11,109 Valid: 5,644 Spoilt: 115 Quota: 1,129 Turnout: 51.84%

== Aftermath ==
=== 2008 Highland by-election ===
On 22 February 2008 Katie Howie of the SNP was elected to the seat formerly held by her late sister, Eleanor who died in late 2007.

Highland by-election (22 February 2008) - 1 seat
Party	Candidate	FPv%	Count
Party	Candidate	FPv%	1
SNP	Katie Howie	59.9	1,891
Conservative	Graham Rees	29.8	940
Liberal Democrats	Andrew Kenton	7.3	229
Labour	Anne Chatt	3.1	97
Electorate: 7,282 Valid: 3,157 Spoilt: 21 Quota: 1,579 Turnout: 43.6%

=== Strathallan by-election ===
On 6 May 2010, Tom May of the SNP held the seat of his party colleague John Law who had died.

Strathallan by-election (6 May 2010) - 1 seat
Party	Candidate	FPv%	Count				
Party	Candidate	FPv%	1	2	3	4	5
Conservative	John Blackie	33.4	1,713	1,724	1,785	2,208	
SNP	Tom Gray	30.3	1,555	1,569	1,769	2,299	3,302
Liberal Democrats	Neil Gaunt	20.3	1,042	1,057	1,321		
Labour	Alistair Munro	14.7	754	762			
Independent	Chris Rennie	1.2	61				
Electorate: 7,642 Valid: 5,125 Spoilt: 54 Quota: 2,563.5 Turnout: 67.8%

=== 2011 Highland by-election ===
On 19 September 2011 Mike Williamson of the SNP was elected to the seat formerly held by Ken Lyall who had emigrated to Australia.

Highland by-election (19 September 2011) - 1 seat
Party	Candidate	FPv%	Count
Party	Candidate	FPv%	1
SNP	Mike Williamson	54.4	1,449
Conservative	Graham Rees	22.4	596
Liberal Democrats	Victor Clements	12.1	321
Independent	William Leske	10.1	269
Independent	Chris Rennie	1.0	27
Electorate: 7,183 Valid: 2,662 Spoilt: 23 Quota: 1,332 Turnout: 37.4%
