= Ochil and South Perthshire =

UK Parliament constituency (2005–2024)

Coordinates: 56.281°N 3.545°W

- Former county constituency for the House of Commons
- Boundary of Ochil and South Perthshire in Scotland
- Subdivision: Clackmannanshire/Perth and Kinross
- Major settlements: Alloa, Auchterarder, Tullibody, Blackford

2005–2024
- Created from: Ochil and Perth
- Replaced by: Alloa and Grangemouth, Perth and Kinross-shire, Stirling and Strathallan, Dollar to Dunfermline and Dollar, Angus and Perthshire Glens

Ochil and South Perthshire was a county constituency of the House of Commons of the Parliament of the United Kingdom. It elected one Member of Parliament (MP) by the first-past-the-post system of election.

The constituency was created for the 2005 general election as a result of the Fifth Review of the Boundary Commission for Scotland. It had been represented from 2019 by John Nicolson of the Scottish National Party (SNP).

The seat was abolished prior to the 2024 general election and replaced by parts of five other constituencies.

== Constituency profile and voting patterns ==
=== Constituency profile ===
The Ochil and South Perthshire constituency covered the rural south of the Perth and Kinross council area south of the River Tay, running down through the Ochil Hills into the more industrial Clackmannanshire council area to the south. It was an affluent constituency.

Agriculture and tourism formed an important part of the local economy in the north of the constituency in southern Perth and Kinross-shire, housing affluent resort towns such as Auchterarder, Crieff and Kinross. Clackmannanshire is better known for its light industry and breweries dotted along the course of the River Forth and its northern tributary streams.

=== Voting patterns ===
The Ochil and South Perthshire constituency was formed from elements of the old Ochil and Perth constituencies. Perth was traditionally a strong area of support for the Conservative Party until the party's wipeout in Scotland at the 1997 general election, from then onwards; the area usually voted SNP. Ochil covered the counties of Kinross-shire and Clackmannanshire, alongside some of the more industrialised parts of Stirlingshire, traditionally an SNP-Labour marginal. When Ochil and South Perthshire was first formed, it was thought of as an SNP-Labour marginal; however, the SNP failed to win the constituency when it was created in 2005, and at the subsequent general election in 2010. Tasmina Ahmed-Sheikh gained the seat from Gordon Banks of the Labour Party in a landslide victory across Scotland at the 2015 general election as they won 56 of Scotland's 59 parliamentary seats. At the 2017 general election, Ahmed-Sheikh lost the constituency to Luke Graham of the Conservative Party, and in 2019, Graham lost the seat to John Nicolson, former SNP MP for East Dunbartonshire.

At the 2017 local election, all wards in southern Perth and Kinross-shire voted Conservative by a good margin. The result in Clackmannanshire was mixed, with the SNP forming the largest party across the county as a whole but missing out to the Conservatives in Dollar to the north-east of the council area and missing out to Labour in northern Alloa. The Conservatives came first across Ochil and South Perthshire on the whole, with the SNP in second place.

== Boundaries ==
Map of boundaries 2005–2024

The constituency is composed of the Clackmannanshire council area (all five wards), and the Perth and Kinross council wards of Strathtay, Strathearn, Strathallan, Almond and Earn, and Kinross-shire.

The constituency was created to cover Clackmannanshire and a southern portion of Perth and Kinross; the Perth and North Perthshire constituency was created at the same time to cover the rest of the Perth and Kinross council area.

Prior to the 2005 election, the council areas had been covered by the Angus, Ochil, Perth and North Tayside constituencies. The Perth constituency was entirely within the Perth and Kinross council area, the North Tayside constituency covered a northern portion of Perth and Kinross and a northern portion of the Angus council area, the Angus constituency covered a small southeastern portion of Perth and Kinross, a southern portion of Angus and northern portions of the Dundee City council area, and the Ochil constituency covered another southeastern portion of the Perth and Kinross, the whole of Clackmannanshire and a southeastern portion of the Stirling council area.

== Abolition ==
Further to the completion of the 2023 periodic review of Westminster constituencies, the seat was abolished for the 2024 general election, with its contents distributed to five new constituencies:

- The bulk of Clackmannanshire, including the town of Alloa, to Alloa and Grangemouth
- Strathearn, Almond and Earn and Kinross-shire to Perth and Kinross-shire
- Strathallan to Stirling and Strathallan
- The small town of Dollar to Dunfermline and Dollar
- A small rural area in the north to Angus and Perthshire Glens

== Members of Parliament ==
Election	Member	Party
2005	Gordon Banks	Labour
2015	Tasmina Ahmed-Sheikh	Scottish National Party
2017	Luke Graham	Conservative
2019	John Nicolson	Scottish National Party

== Elections ==
=== Elections in the 2010s ===
General election 2019: Ochil and South Perthshire
Party	Candidate	Votes	%	±%
SNP	John Nicolson	26,882	46.5	+11.2
Conservative	Luke Graham	22,384	38.7	−2.8
Labour	Lorna Robertson	4,961	8.6	−11.4
Liberal Democrats	Iliyan Stefanov	3,204	5.5	+2.3
UKIP	Stuart Martin	382	0.7	New
Majority		4,498	7.8	N/A
Turnout		57,813	73.4	+2.8
SNP gain from Conservative		Swing	+7.0	

General election 2017: Ochil and South Perthshire
Party	Candidate	Votes	%	±%
Conservative	Luke Graham	22,469	41.5	▲20.8
SNP	Tasmina Ahmed-Sheikh	19,110	35.3	▼10.7
Labour	Joanne Ross	10,847	20.0	▼8.4
Liberal Democrats	Iliyan Stefanov	1,742	3.2	▲0.6
Majority		3,359	6.2	N/A
Turnout		54,168	70.6	▼4.2
Conservative gain from SNP		Swing	▲15.8	

General election 2015: Ochil and South Perthshire
Party	Candidate	Votes	%	±%
SNP	Tasmina Ahmed-Sheikh	26,620	46.0	+18.4
Labour	Gordon Banks	16,452	28.4	−9.5
Conservative	Luke Graham	11,987	20.7	+0.2
Liberal Democrats	Iliyan Stefanov	1,481	2.6	−8.8
UKIP	Martin Gray	1,331	2.3	+0.9
Majority		10,168	17.6	N/A
Turnout		57,871	74.8	+7.6
SNP gain from Labour		Swing	+13.9	

General election 2010: Ochil and South Perthshire
Party	Candidate	Votes	%	±%
Labour	Gordon Banks	19,131	37.9	+6.5
SNP	Annabelle Ewing	13,944	27.6	−2.3
Conservative	Gerald Michaluk	10,342	20.5	−1.0
Liberal Democrats	Graeme Littlejohn	5,754	11.4	−1.9
UKIP	David Bushby	689	1.4	+0.8
Green	Hilary Charles	609	1.2	−0.9
Majority		5,187	10.3	+8.8
Turnout		50,469	67.2	+1.2
Labour hold		Swing	+4.4	

=== Elections in the 2000s ===
General election 2005: Ochil and South Perthshire
Party	Candidate	Votes	%	±%
Labour	Gordon Banks	14,645	31.4	−2.0
SNP	Annabelle Ewing	13,957	29.9	−1.7
Conservative	Liz Smith	10,021	21.5	−0.6
Liberal Democrats	Catherine Whittingham	6,218	13.3	+2.8
Green	George Baxter	978	2.1	New
Scottish Socialist	Iain Campbell	420	0.9	−0.9
UKIP	David Bushby	275	0.6	New
Free Scotland Party	Maitland Kelly	183	0.4	New
Majority		688	1.5	−0.3
Turnout		46,697	66.0	+3.6
Labour hold		Swing	−0.2	
