= Janey Godley =

Scottish actress, writer and comedian (1961–2024)

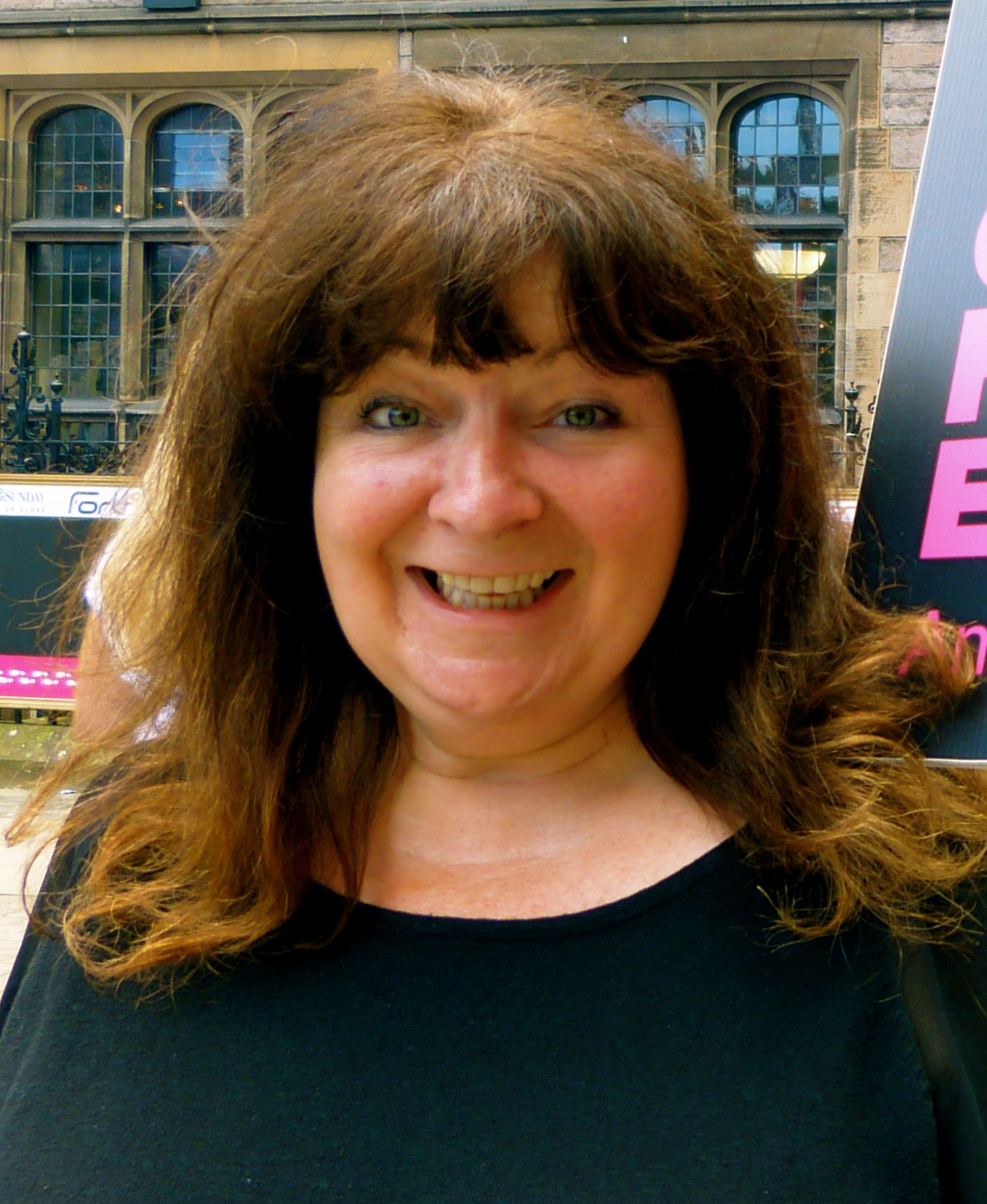
- Godley in 2013
- Born: Jane Godley Currie; 20 January 1961; Lennoxtown, Stirlingshire, Scotland
- Died: 2 November 2024 (aged 63); Glasgow, Scotland
- Other names: Janey Currie; Janey Storrie
- Occupations: Comedian; actress; writer
- Years active: 1994–2024
- Spouse: Sean Storrie (m. 1980)
- Children: Ashley Storrie
- Website: janeygodley.com

Jane Godley Currie (20 January 1961 – 2 November 2024), known professionally as Janey Godley, was a Scottish stand-up comedian, actress, writer and political activist. She began her stand-up career in 1994, and won various awards for her comedy in the 2000s.

During the COVID-19 pandemic, she made a series of voice over clips of politicians and other well known personalities. The following year, she was dropped from a pantomime performance of Beauty and the Beast after a series of controversial racist tweets emerged, for which Godley later apologised. She was later diagnosed with ovarian cancer, from which she died in 2024.

== Early life ==
Godley was born Jane Godley Currie, in Lennoxtown, Stirlingshire (now part of East Dunbartonshire) on 20 January 1961. The youngest of four children born to Annie and Jim Currie, she was raised on Kenmore Street in Shettleston, a district in the East End of Glasgow, and attended Eastbank Academy. Living in poverty, which was rife in the East End during that time, Godley left school at 16 with no qualifications. Her parents were alcoholics and her mother was also addicted to tranquillisers. Her uncle molested her and her sister for a number of years during their childhoods, crimes for which he was sentenced to two years in prison in 1996. Annie went missing and was found dead in 1982 by the River Clyde; Godley said that she believed that her mother had been murdered by her abusive boyfriend Peter Greenshields.

== Career ==
For fifteen years Godley and her husband ran the Weavers Inn public house in Glasgow, where she learned to handle a crowd.

Godley began her stand-up career in 1994 using her middle name as both the Storrie and Currie families had disappointed her and changed her name from Jane Godley Storrie to Janey Godley the following year. She won an award for the "Best Show Concept" at the New Zealand International Comedy Festival in 2002 and the "Spirit of the Festival" in 2006. She published her autobiography Handstands in the Dark in 2005. In 2006, she was a finalist for the Edinburgh Evening Times' "Scotswoman of the Year" award. In 2002, 2006, 2008, and 2009, she was nominated as "Best International Guest" by the New Zealand Comedy Guild. Her TV appearances include River City, Sam Delaney's News Thing, The Alex Salmond Show, Have I Got News for You, and Traces, and she appeared in the film Wild Rose. Godley often made spoof voice-overs of videos.

In 2020, Godley wrote and starred in a series of short films titled Alone, about a recently widowed housewife whose abusive husband has died of COVID-19, as part of the National Theatre of Scotland's Scenes for Survival webseries. In December 2020, the Royal Society of Edinburgh commended Godley's voice-overs of First Minister Nicola Sturgeon's COVID-19 briefings for helping engage the public with the warnings. That year, she won the Scots Language Award's Speaker of the Year Award.

In September 2021, tweets Godley had sent in 2011 were publicised by The Daily Beast, leading MSP Douglas Lumsden to question the decision to cast her in a pantomime performance of Beauty and the Beast. Some of these tweets included insults based on the Chernobyl disaster and disabilities, and racial insults towards African American musicians Kelly Rowland, 50 Cent and Snoop Dogg in 2011. Godley apologised for the tweets and Public Health Scotland dropped her from a campaign.

== Political activism ==
Godley was a strong advocate for the transgender rights movement, actively supporting protections for the international transgender community. She was also a supporter of Scottish independence. Initially a supporter of the Conservatives in her youth, once going so far as to meet Margaret Thatcher at a Scottish Conservative Party Conference in Perth, she later became a supporter of the Scottish National Party and toured the UK in February 2016 in support of Labour Party leader Jeremy Corbyn.

Godley went viral that year after being pictured standing outside Donald Trump's Turnberry Golf resort holding a sign stating "Trump is a Cunt", having been prevented from approaching her subject by Police Scotland, and organised a protest in Glasgow just prior to the election of Trump as president.

== Personal life ==
Godley married Sean Storrie on 27 September 1980. Storrie, who is autistic, was born into a Glasgow gangster family. Their daughter, Ashley Storrie (born 1986), who is also autistic, is a stand-up comedian and BBC Radio Scotland presenter. Godley lived in the Woodlands area of Glasgow's West End.

Godley ran a public house in Calton, Glasgow, with her husband and his family for 14 years during the 1980s and 1990s. In 1982, when Godley was 21, her mother died after drowning in the River Clyde. Godley believed that her mother was murdered by her mother's boyfriend, who she claimed was violent. He was never charged by police for Annie Currie's death despite calls from her family for an investigation. On 31 December 2010, her brother Mij Currie died from a drug-related illness.

=== Illness and death ===
In November 2021, Godley announced via Twitter the cancellation of the last weekend of her tour, explaining that she had been diagnosed with ovarian cancer and was being treated in hospital, and underwent a full hysterectomy in January 2022. In June that year, she announced that she was cancer-free. In December, she announced that her cancer had returned and that she would need further chemotherapy. After her cancer spread, she began to receive palliative care and moved into a hospice in September 2024. She was awarded an honorary doctorate from the University of Glasgow on 31 October 2024.

Godley died at The Prince and Princess of Wales Hospice in Glasgow, on 2 November 2024, aged 63. Former Scottish First Minister Nicola Sturgeon paid tribute to her. Her funeral was held at St Mary's Cathedral, Glasgow and was officiated by Kelvin Holdsworth. Mourners included Nicola Sturgeon and Gavin Mitchell. The funeral ended with a recording of Godley saying her catchphrase, "Frank, get the door" before the cathedral doors opened.

== Filmography ==
Year	Title	Role	Notes
2004	Kings of Comedy	Herself/Performer	Television Special
2009	River City	Maris MacKinnon	Guest Role (1 Episode)
2012	Timeshift	Comedian/Landlady	Contributor (1 Episode)
2012	Chris Ramsey’s Comedy Fringe	Performer	TV Movie
2012	British Passions on Film	Herself	All 3 Episodes
2017	The Blame Game	Performer	Guest Panelist (2 Episodes)
2017	The Alex Salmond Show	Herself	Guest (1 Episode)
2018-2021	Have I Got News For You	Herself	Panelist (4 Episodes)
2018	Super November	Donna	Supporting Role
2018	Wild Rose	Jackie	Supporting Role
2019-2020	Traces	Clare Tindall	Recurring Role (2 Episodes)
2019	The Comedy Underground	Performer	Contributor (1 Episode)
2019	Breaking the News	Herself	Guest Panelist (1 Episode)
2019	The Last Mermaid	Pearl	Main Role
2020	The Sarah O’Connell Show	Herself	Guest (1 Episode)
2020	Billy and Us	Herself	Contributor (All 6 Episodes)
2020	This Morning	Herself	Guest (1 Episode)
2021	Kay Burley	Herself/Comedian	Contributor (1 Episode)
2021	Lorraine	Herself	Guest (1 Episode)
2021	Dregs	Mum	Main Role (All Episodes)
2024	Janey	Herself	Television Documentary

== Books ==
- Godley, Janey (2005). Handstands in the Dark. London: Ebury Press. ISBN 978-0-09-190877-5. OCLC 61175808.
- Godley, Janey (2020). Frank Get the Door!. Illustrated by Christina Connelly. Edinburgh: Luath Press. ISBN 978-1-910022-14-6. OCLC 1198558126.
- Godley, Janey (2022). Nothing Left Unsaid. London: Hodder & Stoughton. ISBN 978-1-5293-5712-7. OCLC 1308460883.
