= Allen Vincatassin =

Chagossian activist

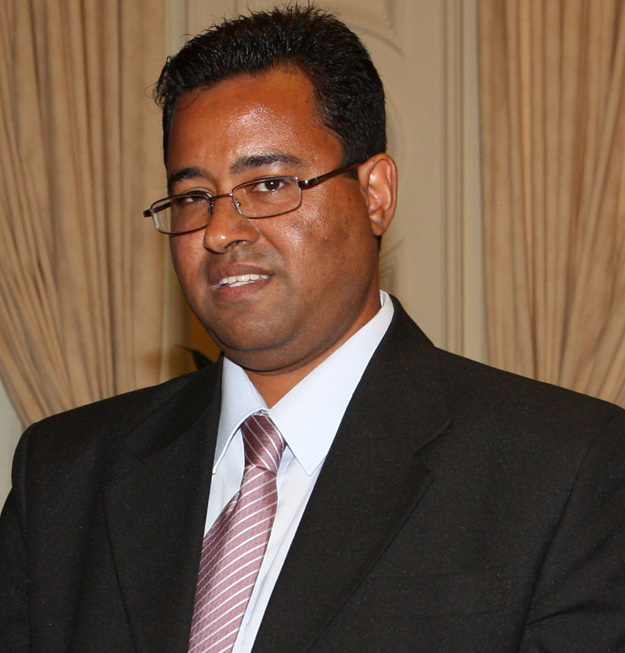
Vincatassin in 2011

Allen Vincatassin is a Chagossian activist who is the first and current President of the Diego Garcia and Chagos Islands Council. He was arrested in 2020 and jailed in 2021 for fraud.

== Early life ==
Vincatassin was one year old when he was evicted from the Chagos Islands. His parents were not married and so ended up on separate islands. Vincatassin went with his paternal grandparents to Mauritius where he was forced to live in poverty.

== Political career ==
Vincatassin was elected as the President of the Diego Garcia and Chagos Islands Council in 2011.

Vincatassin is opposed to Olivier Bancoult's Chagos Refugee Group as "they want Mauritian sovereignty over the islands. That is something we cannot negotiate. We believe that the rights of our people come first, not the state of Mauritius. We are proud to be British citizens and we believe a true democratic future lies with the UK."

Vincatassin said that the government "should disclose how much money it has received" from the sale of .io domain names and asked the government to provide "assurances that it will be used for the islands, including the resettlement that so many Chagossians want to see happen."

In 2015, Vincatassin was interviewed by George Galloway on RT UK's Sputnik.

== Criminal activities ==
In February 2020 Allen Vincatassin, along with Sandeeren Mareemootoo, Yiliana Hengari and Marie Dorothee, appeared in the Snaresbrook Crown Court to face charges of fraud, conspiracy to defraud and fraud by abuse of position. They are alleged to have conspired in 2016 to swindle GBP 88,000 out of 83-year-old Marie Lucienne Anodin's bank account. Vincatassin is also alleged to have used his influence to convince Anodin, who suffered from Alzheimer's disease, to sell her Newham home to a real estate agency for GBP 300,000 which was about half of its market value. Vincatassin was sentenced to a four-year prison sentence in November 2021.

== Books ==
- The Flight to Freedom (CreateSpace Independent Publishing Platform: 2015), ISBN 1499224176
