= Rattansi =

Rattansi may refer to:

- Afshin Rattansi (born 1968), British journalist
- Shihab Rattansi, correspondent for Al Jazeera English
