= Tasmina Ahmed-Sheikh =

Scottish politician

Tasmina Ahmed-Sheikh OBE WS NP
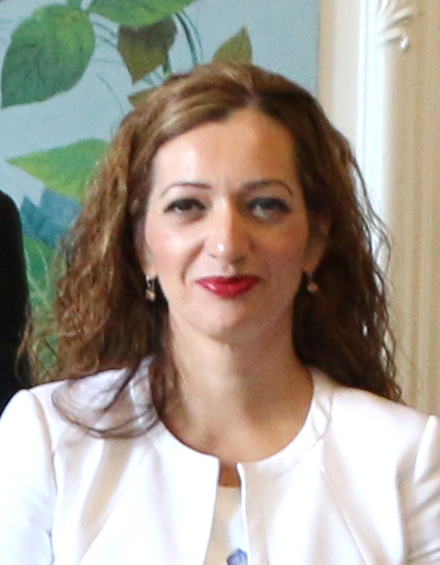
- Ahmed-Sheikh in 2016

Chair of the Alba Party
- In office 26 March 2021 – 13 January 2026
- Leader: Alex Salmond; Kenny MacAskill
- Preceded by: Office established
- Succeeded by: Debbie Ewen

Member of Parliament for Ochil and South Perthshire
- In office 7 May 2015 – 3 May 2017
- Preceded by: Gordon Banks
- Succeeded by: Luke Graham

Personal details
- Born: Tasmina Andalib Rizvi; 5 October 1970 (age 56) Chelsea, London, England
- Party: Independent (since 2026)
- Other political affiliations: Conservative (1986–2000); Labour (2000); SNP (2000–2021); Alba (2021–2026)
- Spouse: Zulfikar Sheikh
- Children: 4
- Education: University of Edinburgh; University of Strathclyde

Tasmina Ahmed-Sheikh (born 5 October 1970) is a British politician, solicitor, and former actress, best known for serving as chair of the Alba Party from 2021 to 2026. She was also the Member of Parliament (MP) for Ochil and South Perthshire from 2015 to 2017. A former member of the Scottish National Party (SNP), Ahmed-Sheikh served as the SNP's Trade and Investment spokesperson, Deputy Shadow Leader of the House of Commons, and National Women's and Equalities Convener.

After losing her parliamentary seat, Ahmed-Sheikh started working at RT UK on The Alex Salmond Show. In March 2021 she switched from the SNP to the Alba Party and then stood as Alba's top list candidate in Central Scotland at the 2021 Scottish Parliament election, but neither she nor her party succeeded in gaining a seat. Ahmed-Sheikh has been described as a key ally of former First Minister Alex Salmond, who led the Alba Party until his death in 2024.

Ahmed-Sheikh also founded and formerly chaired the Scottish Asian Women's Association.

== Early life and education ==
Tasmina Ahmed-Sheikh was born in Chelsea, London, in 1970, and was raised in Edinburgh. She is Pakistani on her paternal side with her father, Mohammad bin Ashiq Rizvi, a Pakistani immigrant to Britain, working first as a lecturer in English at the University of London and then as an insurance broker. He was a Conservative politician, serving as councillor on the New Town/Stockbridge division on Lothian Regional Council from 1986 to 1994 and standing for Edinburgh Leith in 1992. He was the first Asian Conservative councillor in Scotland. Her mother is a half-Welsh, half-Czech actress who performed with the Royal Shakespeare Company (RSC) and completed a law degree in her retirement.

Ahmed-Sheikh was educated at Craigmount High School, George Heriot's School in Edinburgh, the University of Edinburgh (MA) and the University of Strathclyde (LLB & Postgraduate Diploma in Law). She has a sister who is a London-based barrister.

== Legal career ==
Ahmed-Sheikh became a partner at the Glasgow law firm Hamilton Burns, specialising in commercial conveyancing and private client work, often with a family law or immigration element.

On 15 January 2019, she was found guilty of professional misconduct by the Scottish Solicitors' Discipline Tribunal (SSDT) and fined £3,000. The Tribunal found that Ahmed-Sheikh and fellow solicitor Alan Mickel had shown "disregard for the rules" in running a trust and had a conflict of interest when they borrowed money from it to help their ailing firm. In addition to their fines, the pair also had to pay the expenses of the Law Society of Scotland, which had brought the case forward.

In September 2021, the SSDT found her guilty for a second time when she was ruled to have committed "recklessness by omission" during her tenure as the designated cashroom partner at Hamilton Burns, which went into administration in 2017. Ahmed-Sheikh admitted six other breaches of financial rules too but was cleared of any suggestion of dishonesty or a lack of integrity.

== Political career ==
=== Early activism ===
Ahmed-Sheikh was active in the Scottish Conservatives from the age of 10 and a member from 16. She was chairperson of Edinburgh Central Young Conservatives and deputy spokeswoman for the party on women and family issues and equal opportunities. She stood as the party's candidate in Glasgow Govan in the 1999 Scottish Parliament election, where she came in third place with 2,343 votes (8.88%).

While a Conservative Party member, she criticised Alex Salmond as "hopelessly out of his depth" and "utterly naive" for his comments condemning NATO's intervention in Kosovo.

In 2000, she resigned from the Conservatives in response to William Hague's "right wing" pronouncements on asylum seekers. She briefly joined the Labour Party before declaring that she would join the Scottish National Party (SNP), and was welcomed as a 'defector'. "I am not an opportunist, I have changed political parties - so what?", Ahmed-Sheikh said at the time. Salmond said he was "glad she had joined the party".

=== SNP and Yes Scotland ===
In July 2012, she joined the Advisory Board of Yes Scotland, the cross-party campaign for Scottish independence ahead of the upcoming referendum. In May 2014 she was the third candidate on the SNP's list for the European Parliament election, but did not win a seat.

=== Member of Parliament (2015–2017) ===
In the 2015 general election, Ahmed-Sheikh was elected to the UK Parliament in the Ochil and South Perthshire constituency, earning 46% of the vote as the SNP took the seat from Labour incumbent Gordon Banks. She was Scotland's first female Muslim MP. However she lost the seat at the following 2017 general election to Luke Graham of the Conservative Party. During that election campaign, financial allegations emerged, regarding her time as a solicitor; calls were made for her to be suspended from the SNP, but leader Nicola Sturgeon stood by her.

=== Post–parliament and Alba Party (2017–) ===
In 2019, it was reported the SNP declined her application to stand in the upcoming European Parliament election of that year. On 31 March 2021, she was unveiled as a candidate for the Alba Party in the 2021 Scottish Parliament election, and stood for the party in Central Scotland. She was unsuccessful, as were all the other Alba candidates in the election.

Ahmed-Sheikh spoke alongside Alex Salmond in North Macedonia the day that he died in October 2024. She was in fact sitting next to him at lunch when Salmond collapsed and died. Ahmed-Sheikh was struggling to open a bottle of ketchup, when Salmond reached over to help, before collapsing to the floor.

== Political opinions ==
Ahmed-Sheikh was described as being on the right wing of the SNP, having asserted that the party's business policies were more typical of the centre-right. She supports Scottish republicanism.

== Awards and honours ==
She was appointed Officer of the Order of the British Empire (OBE) in the 2014 New Year Honours for services to business and to the Asian community in Scotland.

== Other works ==
=== Acting and media career ===
After graduating in law, Ahmed-Sheikh made acting her first career. She starred in the Pakistani drama series Des Pardes, which led to a series of local modelling shoots. She starred in the 2000 drama Aansoo, playing Imaan, the daughter of a mixed-race Scottish-Pakistani couple; the drama was filmed in both countries and was produced by her husband Zulfikar Sheikh. She produced and appeared in other productions also like The Castle: Aik Umeed (2001) and Thori Khushi Thora Ghum (2002).

Ahmed-Sheikh is the owner (formerly co-owner with Alex Salmond) of Slainte Media, a production company behind The Alex Salmond Show. She regularly co-hosted the programme on RT, until the channel was closed down in March 2022 following the Russian invasion of Ukraine.

Ahmed-Sheikh wrote a column in The National for eight years, signing off in March 2023.

=== Charity work ===
Ahmed-Sheikh founded and chaired the Scottish Asian Women's Association. It launched on 19 April 2012 at Stirling Castle, with the Scottish government supporting this event, to the equivalent of around £16,000. Ahmed-Sheikh resigned as a trustee of SAWA after her election as an MP in 2015. In January 2016, The Herald reported that during the period Ahmed-Sheikh was chair, only a small proportion (3%) of the SAWA's income had been donated to charitable causes. The charity was wound up in 2018.

She was involved with British Muslim Awards from its inception, presenting the awards at the inaugural ceremony in 2013 and in 2014.

She was a trustee of Scottish Women in Sport, a charity founded in 2013.

== Personal life ==
A Muslim, Ahmed-Sheikh married Zulfiqar Sheikh in 1991 and they have four children. Sheikh is an actor, producer and director and the couple has worked together in numerous television projects.

Parliament of the United Kingdom
Preceded by Gordon Banks	Member of Parliament for Ochil and South Perthshire; 2015–2017	Succeeded by Luke Graham
