= Diego Garcia and Chagos Islands Council =

- Headquarters: East Point House, Crawley, United Kingdom; Proposed capital: East Point, British Indian Ocean Territory
- Official languages: English; Ilois creole
- Type: Non-governmental organisation

Government
  - President: Allen Vincatassin
  - Vice-president: Selmour Chery
- Establishment: 2001

The Diego Garcia and Chagos Islands Council is the provisional Chagossian civilian government for the Chagos Archipelago in the Indian Ocean.

Between 1967 and 1973, the United Kingdom removed the entire population of the Chagos Archipelago and prevented them from returning to make way for a United States military base on Diego Garcia. Most of the islanders ended up in Mauritius—which insists the islands were illegally seized from it prior to Mauritian independence—and a minority in Seychelles. The British Overseas Territories Act 2002 made them British citizens, and many moved to the United Kingdom, mainly to Crawley in West Sussex; in 2022 the British government estimated that there were about 10,000 Chagossians in the United Kingdom, Mauritius and Seychelles.

The election was held over a period of three weeks in December 2010 or in early 2011. The results were released on 26 January 2011; only 122 votes were cast by the 4000 or less than 4000 eligible islanders and their descendants. Voters could only choose to support or reject the proposed president and vice-president and a list of key points. Allen Vincatassin and Selmour Chery were elected as president and vice-president, respectively.

The council is based in Great Britain. While the rival Mauritius-based Chagos Refugees Group seeks to become part of Mauritius, the council favors remaining British.

Vincatassin and others were charged with fraud in 2020, accused of conspiring to swindle £88,000 from an 83-year-old woman in 2016; he was convicted and sentenced to four years imprisonment in November 2021.

== Sources ==
- Chagos Islanders v Attorney General and HM BIOT Commissioner, EWHC (QB) 2222 (High Court 9 October 2003).
- Chagos Islanders v Attorney General and HM BIOT Commissioner, EWCA Civ 997 (Court of Appeal 22 July 2004).
- "British Overseas Territories Act 2002 (c. 8)". legislation.gov.uk.
- Legal Consequences of the Separation of the Chagos Archipelago from Mauritius in 1965, Advisory Opinion (PDF). I.C.J. Reports 2019. International Court of Justice. 25 February 2019.
- Chambers, Bala (22 October 2021). "Will Britain give citizenship rights to all Chagos islanders?". Al Jazeera English.
- Syal, Rajeev (1 September 2022). "Evicted Chagos Islanders' descendants to get British citizenship". The Guardian.
