= Ashley Storrie =

Scottish comedian, actress and screenwriter (born 1986)

- Born: Ashley Jane Storrie; 19 April 1986 (age 40); Glasgow, Scotland
- Occupations: Standup comedian, actress, writer, radio personality
- Years active: 1990–present
- Relatives: Janey Godley (mother)

Ashley Jane Storrie (born 19 April 1986) is a Scottish stand-up comedian, presenter on radio and television, actress, and writer.

== Early life ==
Born on 19 April 1986 in Glasgow, Scotland, to Ian Storrie, a pub landlord, and Janey Godley, an actress, writer and comedian. Storrie grew up in Calton, Glasgow. Her parents ran The Weavers Inn, a public house, and Storrie's earliest memory of performing is singing "The Deadwood Stage" there. When they moved from the pub, the family relocated to the affluent West End of Glasgow, where Storrie attended Laurel Bank School in the Hillhead neighbourhood. She was privately educated at Hutchesons' Grammar School, in Glasgow. Storrie's childhood is described in Godley's autobiography, Handstands in the Dark.

Following school Storrie studied filmmaking and screen writing at University of the West of Scotland's Ayr Campus.

Aged four, Storrie appeared in a Ken Loach-directed advertisement for Fairy. In 1997, she appeared in a short film Wednesday's Child as the title character, and in 1999 appeared in her own Edinburgh Festival Fringe show, What Were You Doing When You Were 13?.

== Career ==
Since October 2018, Storrie has presented a late night music and chat show on BBC Radio Scotland on Fridays, between 10pm and 1am until 2025 and midnight since then before the Ashley Storrie Show became part of the Up Late in January 2026.

She has appeared on radio shows including The News Quiz on BBC Radio 4 and the BBC Radio Scotland shows Breaking the News and The Funny Life Of.

In 2016, Storrie received online recognition for her sketch videos, such as "If Harry Potter was Scottish". Storrie explained that when LADbible bought the video, it received 25 million views. When it was posted again the following year, it received 3 million views a day. "If The Handmaid's Tale was Scottish" also went viral on Twitter; it was retweeted by Margaret Atwood, the author of the book.

Storrie's stand-up material tackles mental health, especially women's issues (such as smear tests), aiming to reduce isolation through openness. In her 2019 Edinburgh Fringe show Hysterical, Storrie used humour to address these topics, encouraging solidarity and connection among her audience.

From 2019 to 2020, Storrie co-presented a BBC Scotland television show Up For It with comedians Christopher Macarthur-Boyd and Rosco McClelland, with a series of challenges and skits.

In 2023 and 2024, Storrie recounted her life story in a twelve-episode comedy show on BBC Radio 4, What's the Story, Ashley Storrie? The programme has been recommissioned by the BBC for a second series.

Filmed in 2021, but not broadcast until 2023 due to concern about some of Godley's tweets that were judged to be racist and ableist, Storrie co-presented the four-part BBC Scotland television series Janey and Ashley Get A Real Job. Storrie and her mother, Janey Godley, challenged each other working in various industries, including jobs at a dairy farm, a construction site, in a factory, and at an airport check-in.

=== Dinosaur ===
In 2021, Storrie co-created and starred in the BBC Three comedy television series Dinosaur with Matilda Curtis. The show aired six full episodes in April 2024; a second series of six episodes aired in February 2026.

At the 2024 BAFTA Scotland Awards, Storrie was nominated for "Best Television Actress" as Nina in Dinosaur. She was also nominated for "Best Film/Television Writer" alongside Matilda Curtis. The show also received two other nominations: "Best Scripted Television", and "Best Director" for Niamh McKeown, for four in total. Storrie was also shortlisted for the audience's favourite Scot award, voted for online by the public; she finished with the most votes. Storrie and Curtis shared the writer award.

== Personal life ==
Storrie is autistic, but was not diagnosed until later in life. She has spoken about how this affected her growing up.
