= Gordon Banks (politician) =

British Labour Party politician

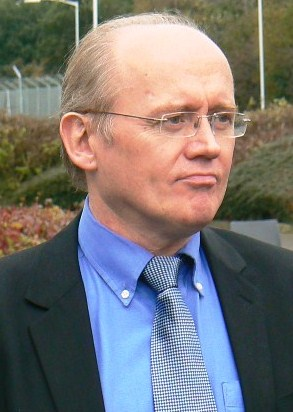
- Banks in 2008

Shadow Minister for Scotland
- In office 18 March 2013 – 8 May 2015
- Leader: Ed Miliband
- Preceded by: Willie Bain
- Succeeded by: Paul Sweeney (2017)

Shadow Minister for Business, Innovation and Skills
- In office 8 October 2010 – 23 May 2011
- Leader: Ed Miliband
- Succeeded by: Chuka Umunna

Member of Parliament for Ochil and South Perthshire
- In office 5 May 2005 – 30 March 2015
- Preceded by: Constituency established
- Succeeded by: Tasmina Ahmed-Sheikh

Personal details
- Born: 14 June 1955 (age 71) Acomb, Northumberland, England
- Party: Labour
- Education: University of Stirling

Gordon Raymond Banks (born 14 June 1955) is a British Labour politician who served as the Member of Parliament (MP) for Ochil and South Perthshire from 2005 to 2015.

== Early life ==
Banks was born in Acomb, Northumberland and educated at the Lornshill Academy in Alloa and then the Glasgow College of Building. He later obtained an honours degree in History and Politics from the University of Stirling.

He has worked in the construction industry for 31 years, and formed his own building supplies business in 1986.

== Member of Parliament ==
Banks was elected in the new constituency of Ochil and South Perthshire at the 2005 general election, defeating both Annabelle Ewing and Liz Smith.

Shortly after his election, Banks became a member of the Regulatory Reform Committee, the Unopposed Bills (Panel) Committee, the Scottish Affairs Committee and the Northern Ireland Affairs Select Committee. In May 2006, he became a PPS to James Purnell, and subsequently left the Scottish and Northern Ireland committees.

In October 2010, he was appointed as one of the Shadow Ministers of the Department of Business, Innovation and Skills. He resigned from this role in April 2011 to concentrate on his constituency duties, and was succeeded by Chuka Ummuma. He returned to the opposition front bench in 2013 as Shadow Minister for Scotland.

During his period as an MP he also successfully ran by-election campaigns for Westminster (1) and Holyrood(2). He also ran the successful 2012 Council elections for the City of Glasgow.

Later he also played a leading role in running Scottish Labour's campaign in the 2014 independence referendum.

In many of these campaigns he worked alongside James Kelly MSP.

He was defeated by Tasmina Ahmed-Sheikh of the Scottish National Party at the 2015 general election.

== Personal life ==
Banks is married with two children. He is a member of the Coeliac Society.

== See also ==
- List of people diagnosed with coeliac disease

Parliament of the United Kingdom
Preceded by Martin O'Neill	Member of Parliament for Ochil and South Perthshire; 2005–2015	Succeeded by Tasmina Ahmed-Sheikh
