= Ava Vidal =

English comedian

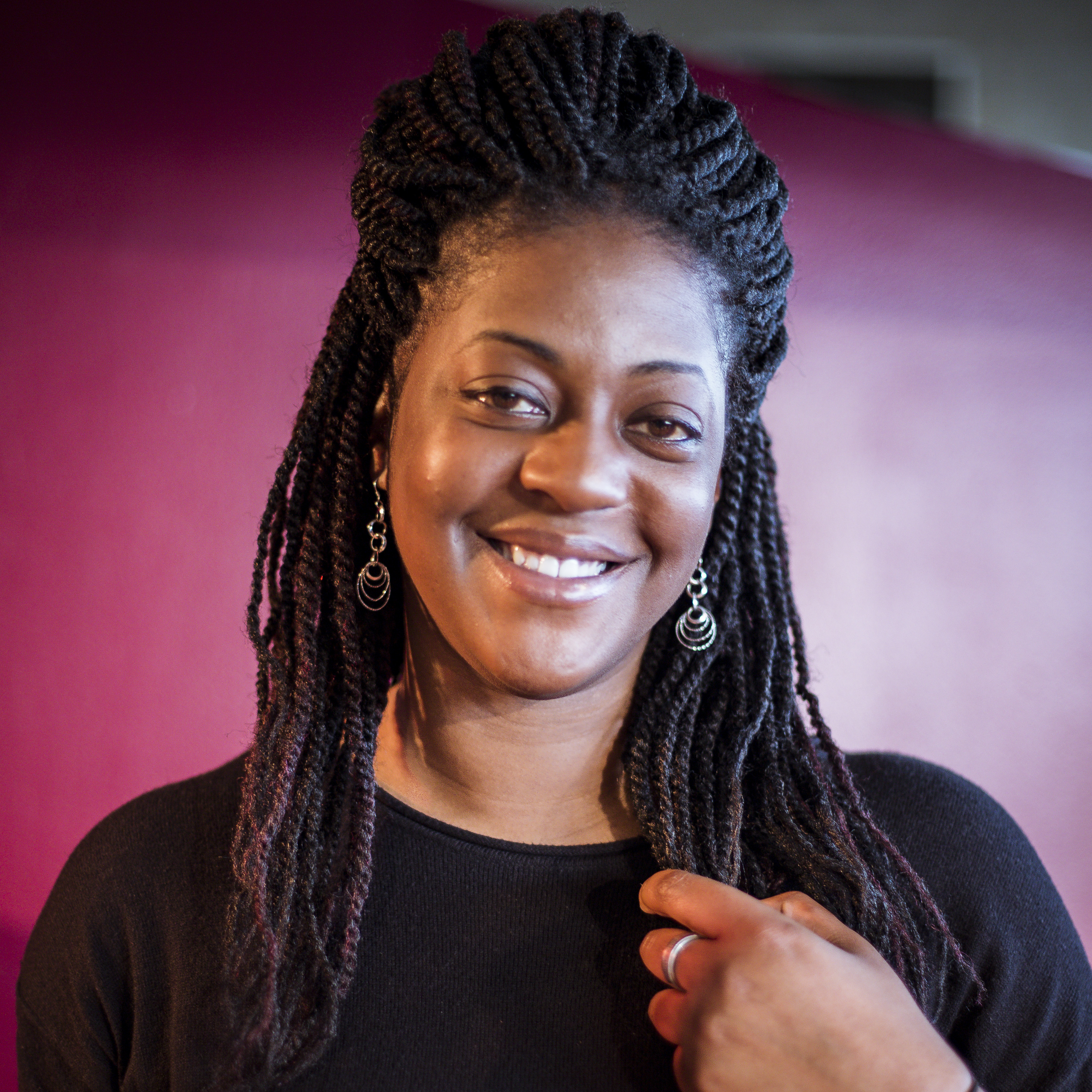
- Born: Ava Beverley Vidal; 1976 (age 49–50); Lambeth, London, England
- Children: 3

Comedy career
- Medium: Stand–up; television
- Genres: Observational comedy; sketch comedy; satire

Ava Beverley Vidal (/ˈeɪvə vɪˈdɑːl/; born 1976 in Lambeth, London) is an English comedian. She has taken part in E4's Kings of Comedy. Her career in comedy began on the BBC's Urban Sketch Show.

== Life and career ==
In 1996, Vidal began working as a prison officer at HM Prison Pentonville in Barnsbury, North London. She was inspired to go into the field by her mother, who worked at HM Prison Holloway. Vidal decided to quit the prison profession in 2001 to go to university and study law. Around this time, she also began writing comedy material.

Vidal appeared in 28 Acts in 28 Minutes and The Comic Side of 7 Days in 2005. She has also been involved in other BBC shows including The Last Laugh, The Sack Race and The Crouches. Vidal was a housemate in Kings of Comedy on E4, and Channel 4 made a documentary about her called From the Top, a half-hour show explaining her journey in comedy so far and how she became a comedian.

Vidal was on the line-up of Michael McIntyre's Comedy Roadshow in Swansea that aired on 27 June 2009, BBC Radio 4's The News Quiz in February and October 2010, and appeared four times on BBC Two's Mock the Week between 2011 and 2013. In July 2012, she appeared on Is Football Racist? on BBC Three.

On BBC Three's Free Speech, she suggested armed drug dealers should be helped rather than sent to prison.

In 2016, along with numerous other celebrities, Vidal toured the UK to support Jeremy Corbyn's bid to become Prime Minister. Vidal presents her own YouTube podcast named Black Woman's Hour.

== Personal life ==
Vidal has three children, two daughters and a son. Her eldest daughter, Shaquelle, died in April 2018.
