= John Nicolson =

Scottish politician and journalist

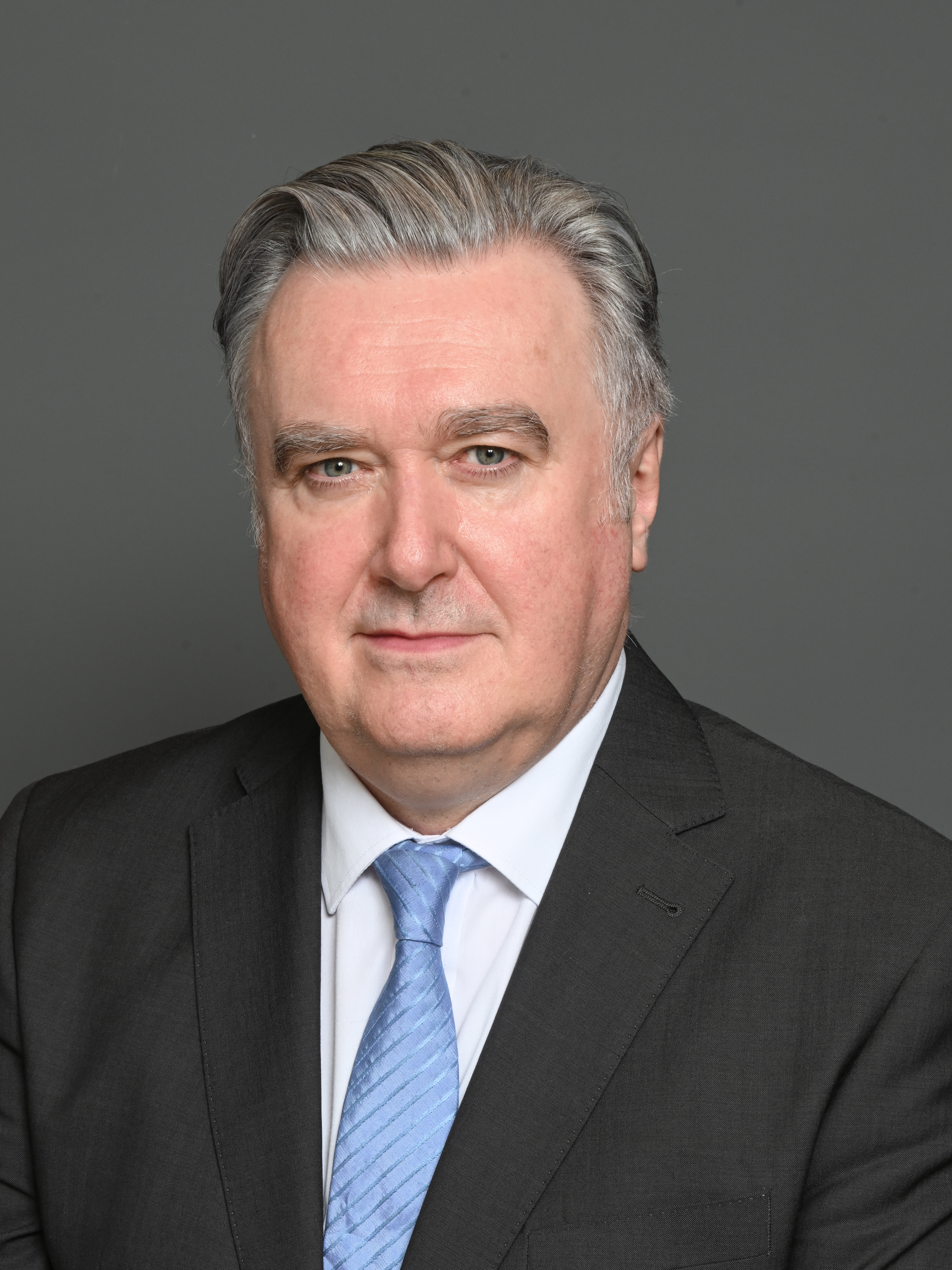
- Official portrait, 2023

SNP Spokesperson for Digital, Culture, Media and Sport in the House of Commons
- In office 7 January 2020 – 5 July 2024
- Leader: Ian Blackford; Stephen Flynn
- Preceded by: Hannah Bardell
- In office 20 May 2015 – 8 June 2017
- Leader: Angus Robertson
- Preceded by: Office established
- Succeeded by: Brendan O'Hara

Member of Parliament for Ochil and South Perthshire
- In office 12 December 2019 – 30 May 2024
- Preceded by: Luke Graham
- Succeeded by: Constituency abolished

Member of Parliament for East Dunbartonshire
- In office 7 May 2015 – 3 May 2017
- Preceded by: Jo Swinson
- Succeeded by: Jo Swinson

Personal details
- Born: John MacKenzie Nicolson; 23 June 1961 (age 65) Glasgow, Scotland
- Party: Scottish National Party
- Domestic partner: Juliano Zini
- Education: University of Glasgow; Harvard University

John MacKenzie Nicolson (born 23 June 1961) is a Scottish journalist, broadcaster and Scottish National Party (SNP) politician.

Nicolson served as the SNP Member of Parliament (MP) for Ochil and South Perthshire from 2019 general election until the seat's abolition in 2024. He was previously the MP for East Dunbartonshire, having been elected at the 2015 general election, and defeated at the 2017 general election. He contested Alloa and Grangemouth in the 2024 election but was defeated.

He was the SNP shadow secretary of state for culture, media and sport, a member of the House of Commons Culture, Media and Sport Committee, chair on the All Party Parliamentary Group for Democracy & the Constitution and deputy chair of the APPG on Global LGBT+ Rights.

== Early life and education ==
John Nicolson was born in Glasgow, the son of John Donald Nicolson and Marion Nicolson. His ancestry is Hebridean and Orcadian on his father's side. His mother came from Scotstoun in Glasgow. His father died of lung cancer when he was at school and aged 15.

Nicolson won a bursary to Hutchesons' Grammar School, and is the first generation of his family to go to university. He graduated from the University of Glasgow with a MA (Hons.) in English literature and Politics. He was awarded a Kennedy Scholarship for postgraduate study in the United States, and was Harkness Fellow in American Government at Harvard Kennedy School at Harvard University.

As a student, he won the British Isles Observer Mace (now the John Smith Memorial Mace), and World Universities Debating Championship in the same year, winning the World Championship with his debate partner Frank McKirgan at Princeton University. He returned to the Glasgow University Union in 2012 to debate against other former World Universities' Championship winners on a motion welcoming Scottish independence.

After graduating from Harvard, he worked as a speechwriter on Capitol Hill for Senator Daniel Patrick Moynihan specialising in Israel-Palestinian issues, the Irish peace process, and gun control.

== Broadcasting career ==
=== BBC ===
He moved back to the UK from Washington, D.C. to work full-time for the BBC when offered a job presenting the network 'DEF 2' youth strand discussion programme Open to Question.

After three series Nicolson moved to London as one of the launch reporters for the BBC's flagship Sunday politics programme On the Record. He made the documentary 'A Question of Consent' for the BBC's Public Eye. The documentary examined the discriminatory laws targeting gay men in the UK, and asked why the Conservative Party continued to support them.

He went on to work as a reporter for a range of high-profile BBC news and current affairs shows including Panorama, Assignment, and Newsnight.

Nicolson was the BBC presenter on 11 September 2001 when the Twin Towers in New York were attacked, anchoring and providing live commentary on BBC News 24 and BBC One – a broadcast which won the BBC a Foreign Press Association award for best live breaking news coverage. Of the broadcast, Nicolson said, "My time on air seemed dream like, with hours passing in an instant, and yet individual moments seeming to linger endlessly."

=== ITV ===
He has said in later years that he preferred the interview environment at ITV. In stark contrast to the BBC, his ITV bosses were happy to go over time if the party's press office was unhappy with his probing questions to a politician.

=== Other media work ===
John Nicolson has written for a wide range of newspapers and magazines including The Times, The Herald, The New York Times, The Boston Globe, The Sunday Times, The Sunday Telegraph, The Guardian, New Statesman, The Daily Record, and the Harvard International Review. He appeared as himself in The Trial of Tony Blair for Channel 4.

He has worked as a radio presenter for BBC Radio Scotland, BBC Radio 4 where he presented The Westminster Hour, and BBC Radio 5. He is a regular commentator on UK politics for American audiences on the Cumulus Media Networks radio programme The John Batchelor Show. He presented the daily breakfast 'John Nicolson and Jane Moore Show' on LBC 97.3 and has, since 2017, been the host of The Week with John Nicolson on Talkradio. His final Talk Radio show was on Sunday 28 March 2021. He has been one of the SNP's most prominent media spokespeople since being elected to Parliament in 2015 with regular appearances on The Andrew Marr Show, Question Time, Any Questions?, This Week with Andrew Neil, Westminster Hour on Radio 4, Channel 4 News and The Wright Stuff on Channel 5. During his campaign to be re-elected in 2017, Nicolson told The Irish Times, "People like that they can see me on the telly, talking about East Dunbartonshire."

In 2020, Nicolson worked 98 and a half hours for News UK – three hours each Sunday – as a journalist. He declared outside earnings of £19,700, amounting to an hourly wage of £200. In 2021 his contract with the outlet was terminated, something he alleged was due to an editorial desire for "uniform views".

== Political career ==
=== Early career ===
John Nicolson joined the Scottish National Party aged 16, but let his membership lapse whilst working as a BBC and ITV journalist. He rejoined the party in the run up to the Scottish independence referendum. He was a member of the National Collective, the student cultural movement campaigning for Scottish independence during Scotland's Referendum.

=== Member of Parliament for East Dunbartonshire (2015–17) ===
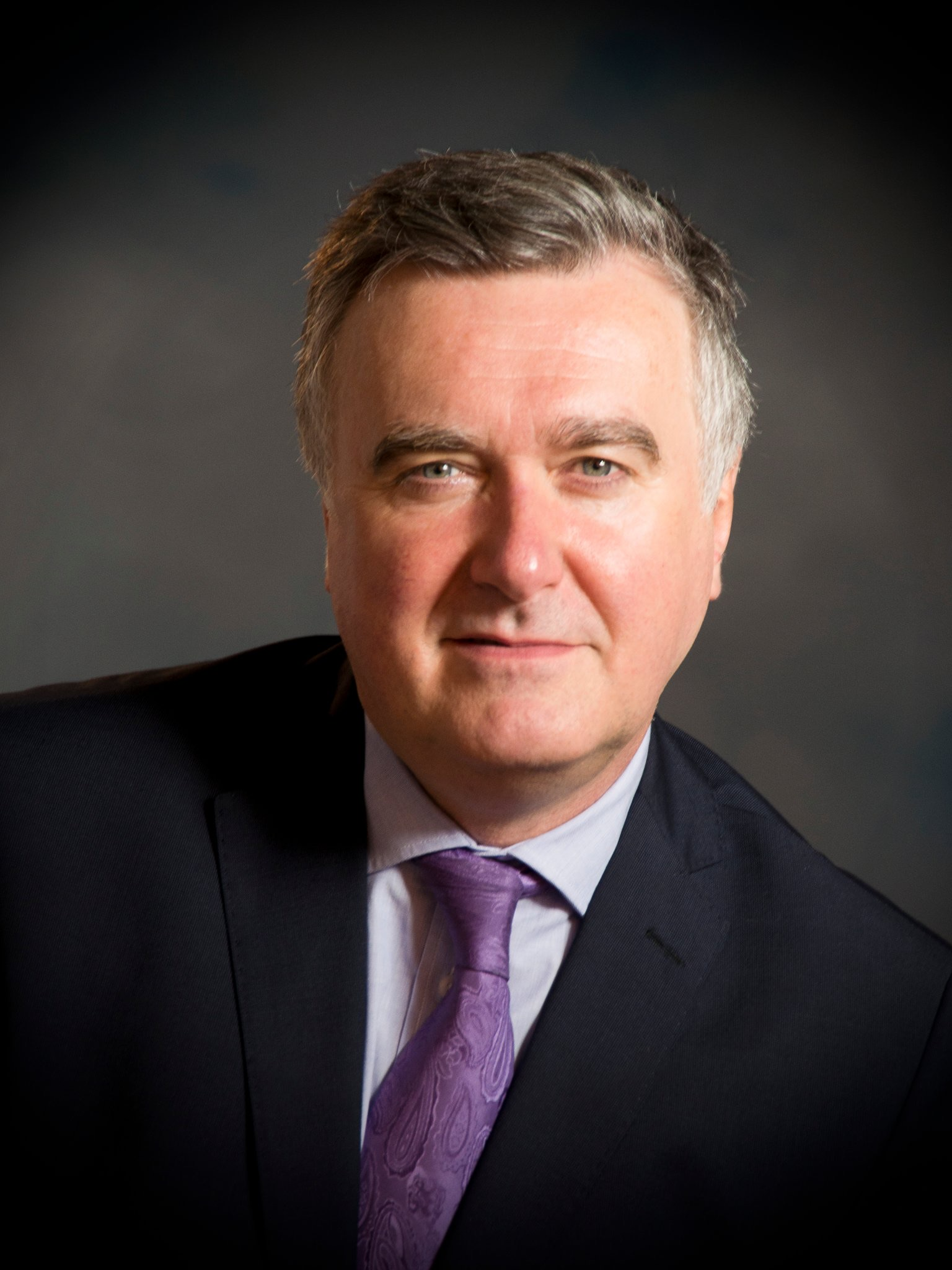
Nicolson in 2015

Nicolson was elected to Parliament as MP for East Dunbartonshire at the 2015 general election with 40.3% of the vote and a majority of 2,167.

Nicolson was appointed Shadow SNP Spokesperson for Culture, Media and Sport shortly after his election. A strong supporter of public service broadcasting, he led the campaign at Westminster to prevent Channel 4 from being privatised. He also campaigned for the establishment of a separate BBC Scottish Six O'Clock News – a proposal which won the unanimous support of members of the Commons Culture, Media and Sport Select Committee on which he sat. The BBC subsequently announced a separate Scottish channel with a 9 o'clock news hour.

Nicolson used his position to cross examine the BBC Chair Rona Fairhead, revealing the unorthodox way in which she had been appointed without due process. She withdrew her candidacy for the new BBC Board shortly afterwards. He also proposed that the BBC publish all presenter pay, arguing that it would reveal some hugely inflated salaries, a shortage of BME presenters at the top of the BBC earnings league, and a significant gender pay gap. His proposal was accepted by the DCMS Select Committee, and the Government. When BBC presenter salaries were subsequently published there was public controversy as a significant underpayment of women at the corporation was revealed.

As a member of the DCMS Select Committee, Nicolson used the platform to talk about homophobia in sport, persuading the committee to launch an inquiry. He was also actively involved in the parliamentary inquiries into "fake news", the abuse of ticket sales by touts, complaints against the press, combating doping in sport, and the impact of Brexit on the creative industries, tourism and the digital single market.

An opponent of Brexit, Nicolson campaigned for Scotland to remain in the Single Market.

A supporter of Palestinian rights and an independent homeland for the Palestinian people, Nicolson visited Israel and the Palestine territories with Medical Aid for Palestinians and the Council for the Advancement of Arab-British Understanding soon after his election.

In 2016, Nicolson put forward a Private Member's Bill for an 'Alan Turing law' which would retrospectively pardon all gay men who had been convicted of offences no longer on the statute books. The Conservative government initially promised to support his proposed legislation, but then reversed its position following Theresa May's election as Conservative leader, causing a number of Tory MPs to condemn their own front bench as untrustworthy. Nicolson's bill was filibustered by Conservative government Justice Minister Sam Gyimah. The SNP Scottish Government subsequently announced that it would pick up and pass a Scottish version of the bill with all party support at Holyrood, the Historical Sexual Offences (Pardons and Disregards) (Scotland) Act 2018 which came into effect in 2019.

In 2016, The Herald newspaper dubbed him "bottom of the league for written questions", after reporting that he had submitted fewer than any other newly elected SNP MP. Commenting on the story, the Scottish National Party said this was "traditional for senior frontbenchers who can question ministers in other ways."

In 2016, Nicolson repeatedly criticised on social media STV's Digital Politics and Comment Editor, Stephen Daisley, who had published critical opinion pieces about the SNP. He tweeted: "[Daisley] is meant to be a neutral journalist – not an activist." Nicolson and another SNP MP, Pete Wishart, complained about him to STV bosses and Daisley alleges he was told, "We can't afford to have a member of the Culture, Media and Sport Committee complaining about us." Daisley stopped writing opinion pieces for STV and Nicolson and Wishart were accused of "gagging" him. However, the SNP said: "At no point did they ask for Mr Daisley to stop writing and any suggestion otherwise is completely untrue. Any editorial decisions are entirely a matter for STV." STV denied censoring any of its journalists.

Nicolson failed to be re-elected in 2017, losing to the seat's former MP, Liberal Democrat Jo Swinson.

=== Member of Parliament for Ochil and South Perthshire (2019–2024) ===
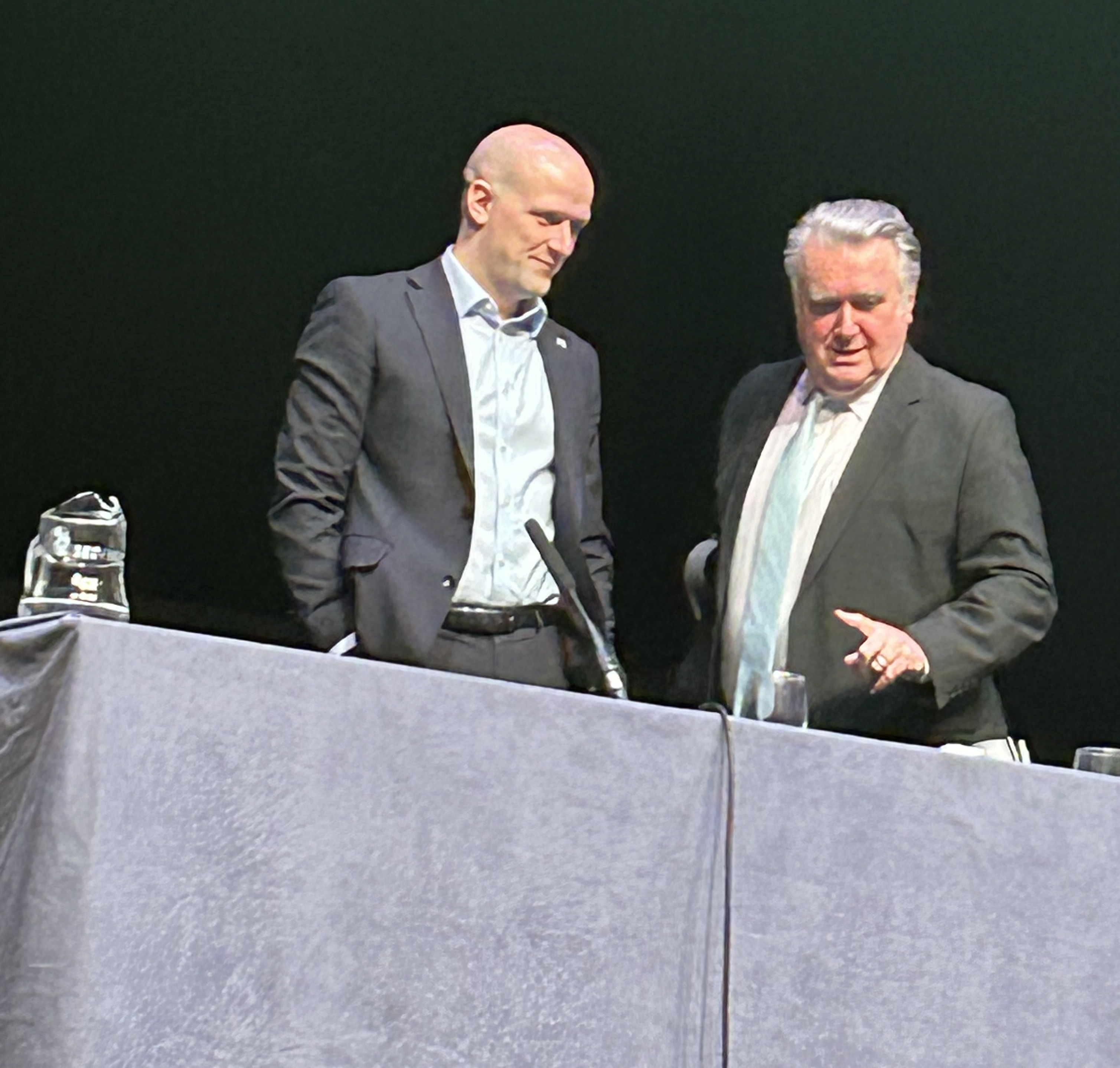
SNP House of Commons leader Stephen Flynn and Nicolson at the 2024 National Campaign Council

At the 2019 general election, Nicolson stood as the SNP candidate in Ochil and South Perthshire. During the 2019 general election campaign, Nicolson was heckled at a hustings in Alloa after telling the audience, "Only the Scottish National Party can beat the Tories here in East Dunbartonshire." Afterwards, Nicolson said "I made a slip of the tongue. We're all human." Nicolson was elected as MP for Ochil and South Perthshire with 46.5% of the vote and a majority of 4,498.

As a member of the CMS Committee, Nicolson has taken evidence from witnesses and cross-examined ministers as part of inquiries on a number of issues including public service broadcasting, the economics of music streaming, concussion in sport and the impact of Brexit and the COVID-19 pandemic on culture and the arts. Following an exchange between Nicolson and Director-General of the BBC Tim Davie on the DCMS Committee, the BBC revealed it had spent in excess of a million pounds on external lawyers fighting women and BAME staff over equal pay and race discrimination cases.

During the first coronavirus lockdown, Nicolson fundraised to donate tablet devices to hospitals serving constituents of Ochil and South Perthshire, so that patients in COVID-19 ICU wards could stay in contact with friends and family members. He said, "Having my own mum in hospital recently brought home to me again how important it is for patients to be able to stay in touch with relatives and friends, especially now that hospital visits aren't possible."

As a result of the coronavirus pandemic, in-person constituency surgeries were not permitted and Nicolson became the first parliamentarian in Britain to launch an automated 'virtual surgery' booking system.

In March 2021, Nicolson called for a debate in parliament on the disposal of unexploded mines and bombs on the seabed left there during the World Wars: "These explosions will kill any sea life nearby. If they do not die instantly, the pressure wave causes traumatic harm, such as lesions, haemorrhages and decompression sickness."

In July 2021, a joint committee was established by the House of Commons and the House of Lords to consider the government's draft Online Safety Bill to which Mr Nicolson was appointed.

In November 2022 Nicolson was rebuked by the Speaker of the House of Commons, Lindsay Hoyle, for partially leaking the contents of a letter. Parliament voted to refer Nicolson to the Commons Select Committee of Privileges over the alleged leak. The Committee acquitted Mr Nicolson.

In June 2023, Nicolson was cleared of bullying Conservative MP Nadine Dorries, who had complained about his conduct in a Parliamentary Committee meeting and several tweets that he had liked on Twitter, including one that referred to Dorries as a "vacuous goon". Dorries' complaint was initially upheld by the Parliamentary Commissioner for Standards, before an independent panel cleared Nicolson on appeal, based on, among other factors, Dorries' own record of behaviour on Twitter.

Nicolson was the SNP candidate in the new constituency of Alloa and Grangemouth in the 2024 general election. He was defeated by Labour Party candidate Brian Leishman.

== Personal life ==
In 1999, when he was a presenter on BBC Breakfast, Nicolson came out as gay in various newspapers. He was the first BBC network television presenter to do so. He told the House of Commons that although the decision was tough, and not welcomed by his bosses at the BBC who were unsupportive, he is glad that he made it. "I've lost track of the number of people who've told me subsequently that when I came out in the papers they told their parents. Gay kids should have role models. They should know that being gay doesn't stop you doing anything as an adult."

Nicolson lives in Bearsden in north Glasgow with his long-term partner Juliano Zini. Nicolson is a landlord.

Parliament of the United Kingdom
Preceded by Jo Swinson	Member of Parliament for East Dunbartonshire; 2015–2017	Succeeded by Jo Swinson
Preceded by Luke Graham	Member of Parliament for Ochil and South Perthshire; 2019–2024	Constituency abolished
