= Janey =

- Gender: Female

Origin
- Origin: Hebrew
- Meaning: "Yahweh is gracious/merciful"
- Region of origin: Worldwide

Other names
- Related names: John, Jane
- Popularity: see popular names

Janey is a diminutive form of the feminine given name Jane.

== People with this name ==
- Janey Buchan (1926–2012), Scottish Labour Member of the European Parliament (MEP) for the Glasgow
- Janey Sevilla Callander (1846–1923), British theatre producer
- Janey Canuck, pen name used by Emily Murphy (1868–1933), Canadian women's rights activist, jurist, and author
- Janey Godley (1961–2024), British stand-up comedian and writer
- Janey Gohl (born 1956), beauty queen from St. Cloud, Minnesota, competed in the Miss USA pageant
- Janey Lee Grace, (born 1960), British based singer, author, television presenter and radio disc jockey
- Janey Ironside (1919–1979), former professor of fashion at the Royal College of Arts, London
- Janey Jacké (born 1992), Dutch drag queen and performer
- Janey Scott Lewin, pen name of Roberta Leigh (1926–2014), British author and artist

== Fictional character ==
- Brainy Janey, nickname of Mary Jane Watson in Marvel comic books
- Janey Powell, friend of Lisa Simpson and recurring character in The Simpsons
- Janey Harper, the middle child and only daughter of Ben Harper (My Family) and Susan Harper in the BBC sitcom My Family

== See also ==
- Janey, Virginia, a community in the United States
- Janey Slaughter Briscoe Grand Opera House, historic theater in Uvalde, Texas
- Janey III or USS Onyx (PYc-5), diesel coastal patrol yacht of the United States Navy during World War II
- Truth and Janey, American rock band from Iowa
- Jane (disambiguation)
- Janney (disambiguation)
