= Keiser Report =

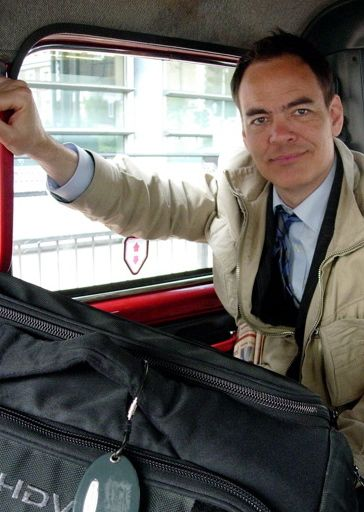
- Max Keiser in a London taxi
- Genre: News and current affairs
- Created by: Russia Today (RT)
- Presented by: Max Keiser
- Starring: Stacy Herbert
- Original language: English
- No. of episodes: 1819

Production
- Production location: Various
- Running time: 30 minutes

Original release
- Network: RT
- Release: September 2009 – February 24, 2022

The Keiser Report was a financial news and analysis show on RT UK and the Russian state RT network, hosted by Max Keiser and Stacy Herbert, a married couple. It ran from September 2009 to February 2022, with three new shows every week. Herbert is the co-host; she bantered with Keiser on headlines and commentary. It was produced by the Associated Press.

The Independent described the show as "mischievously seditious" and Keiser as "America's most outrageous political pundit".

An episode broadcast in September 2011 featured an interview with the comedian Roseanne Barr, who stated that her solution to the 2008 financial crisis was to "bring back the guillotine".

On February 24, 2022, Keiser quit the show after 1819 episodes in response to changes in the media landscape following the 2022 Russian invasion of Ukraine.

On June 30, 2022, Max and Stacy rebooted their show on Youtube albeit renamed to Max & Stacy Report. It uses the same format and runtime as the original Keiser Report on RT and has frequent new episodes uploaded weekly.
