= Open to Question =

- Presented by: Donny MacLeod; Mary Marquis; Donald MacCormick; Don Cupitt; Hilary O'Neill; Michael MacFarlane; John Nicolson; Krishnan Guru-Murthy; John Kelly

Production
- Running time: 35-60 minutes

Original release
- Network: BBC2 Scotland
- Release: 5 June 1972 – 23 March 1992

Open to Question is a current affairs television programme, broadcast by BBC Scotland. Beginning as a regional broadcast in June 1972 until 1973, the programmes were hosted in turn by Donny MacLeod, Mary Marquis and Donald MacCormick.

Guests in the early programmes included Chay Blyth and John Ridgway, the Atlantic rowers; Communist Jimmy Reid and Lord George MacLeod of Fuinary; and MPs, anti-Royalist Willie Hamilton, and pro-Royalist Norman St John-Stevas. In 1976, the programme was revamped and networked on BBC1 with Don Cupitt, Dean of Emmanuel College, Cambridge, moderating the discussion, focusing on religious matters. The series was rested after 1977 but returned in 1984 under the production of BBC Scotland, featuring an audience of youngsters, mainly teenagers. After airing on BBC1 Scotland with Hilary O'Neill and Michael MacFarlane as hosts, the show moved to BBC2 in December 1984 with repeats of most of the episodes. An episode featuring David Steel was not included in the re-runs. In 1988, Krishnan Guru-Murthy became the host of the series at just 18 years old. John Kelly replaced Guru-Murthy for the final series, in 1992. The series brand continued on BBC Radio 1 hosted by Emma Freud from January - December 1994.

== Premise ==
It was a British audience participation talk show which involved Scottish teenagers asking questions to celebrities about topical issues of the day.

== Guests ==
(Sourced from the BBC's Radio Times archive)

- 10 Dec 1984: Ato Wahib Muluneh, Dr. John Seaman & George Galloway.
- 14 Dec 1984: Arthur Scargill.
- 18 Dec 1984: Billy Connolly.
- 21 Dec 1984: HRH Princess Anne.
- 8 Jan 1985: The Rt Hon Cecil Parkinson, MP.
- 15 Jan 1985: The Bishop of Durham, The Right Rev David Jenkins.
- 22 Jan 1985: Tessa Sanderson, Mary Peters and Wendy Sly.
- 29 Jan 1985: Jimmy & Sarah Boyle.
- 5 Feb 1985: The Rt Hon Enoch Powell, MP
- 12 Feb 1985: Midge Ure, Stuart Adamson and Robert Hodgens.
- 17 Sep 1985: John Nicolson replaces Hilary O'Neill and Michael MacFarlane as host. Desmond Tutu is guest.
- 24 Sep 1985: The Rt Hon Neil Kinnock, MP, Leader of the Labour Party.
- 1 Oct 1985: Mrs. Victoria Gillick.
- 8 Oct 1985: Former Prime Minister of Rhodesia Mr. Ian Smith.
- 15 Oct 1985: Steve Sawyer, Greenpeace.
- 22 Oct 1985: James Anderton, Chief Constable of Greater Manchester & Leslie Curtis, Chairman of the Police Federation of England and Wales.
- 29 Oct 1985: Dr. David Owen.
- 5 Nov 1985: Jeffrey Archer.
- 12 Nov 1985: Jo-Ag-Quis-Ho, Chief of the Iroquois Confederacy.
- 19 Nov 1985: Vladimir Pozner.
- 26 Nov 1985: Tony Benn.
- 3 Dec 1985: Cliff Richard.
- 10 Dec 1985: Aurora & Michael El Legion.
- 22 Sep 1986: Derek Hatton & John Macreadie.
- 29 Sep 1986: Jim Kerr.
- 6 Oct 1986: Mrs. Mary Whitehouse.
- 13 Oct 1986: Lord Walter Marshall.
- 20 Oct 1986: Ian Botham.
- 27 Oct 1986: Former Vice-President Walter Mondale (via satellite).
- 17 Nov 1986: Former Prime Minister Edward Heath.
- 24 Nov 1986: Guest not specified by Radio Times.
- 1 Dec 1986: Guest not specified by Radio Times.
- 8 Dec 1986: Denis Healey.
- 15 Dec 1986: South Africa's Deputy Foreign Minister Ron Miller (via satellite).
- 29 Sep 1987: Bernie Grant.
- 6 Oct 1987: Edwina Currie.
- 13 Oct 1987: Terry Butcher.
- 20 Oct 1987: Ben Elton.
- 27 Oct 1987: Janet & Stewart Farrar.
- 3 Nov 1987: Former News of the World editor David Montgomery.
- 10 Nov 1987: Peter Tatchell.
- 17 Nov 1987: Freemason Commander Michael Higham.
- 24 Nov 1987: Billy Bragg.
- 1 Dec 1987: Winnie Ewing.
- 8 Dec 1987: Clive Barker.
- 15 Dec 1987: Michael Grade.
- 22 Dec 1987: Sir Ian MacGregor.
- 9 May 1988: Live edition. Guest not specified by Radio Times.
- 16 May 1988: Live edition. Guest not specified by Radio Times.
- 30 May 1988: Live edition. Tom Robinson & The Rev David Holloway.
- 6 Jun 1988: Live edition. Senator Gary Hart.
- 13 Jun 1988: Live edition. Linda Lusardi, Gail McKenna & Miss Bluebell Margaret Kelly.
- 21 Sep 1988: Krishnan Guru-Murthy becomes host. Guest: Jimmy Savile.
- 28 Sep 1988: John Prescott, MP.
- 5 Oct 1988: Guest not specified in Radio Times.
- 12 Oct 1988: Dr. Jerry Nims.
- 19 Oct 1988: Guest not specified in Radio Times.
- 26 Oct 1988: Guest not specified in Radio Times.
- 3 April 1989: Pamela Stephenson.
- 10 April 1989: The Guardian Angels founders Curtis Sliwa & Dave Edmond.
- 17 April 1989: Janet Street-Porter.
- 24 April 1989: Rt Hon Roy Hattersley, MP.
- 8 May 1989: Rt Hon Douglas Hurd, MP. (Originally scheduled but postponed from 1 May)
- 15 May 1989: Padre Miguel D'Escoto.
- 13 Jan 1992: John Kelly becomes host. Guest: Justin Fashanu.
- 20 Jan 1992: Robbie Coltrane.
- 27 Jan 1992: Tom Sutherland.
- 3 Feb 1992: Bernadette Devlin McAliskey.
- 24 Feb 1992: Caroline Cossey.
- 2 Mar 1992: Kate Adie.
- 16 Mar 1992: Nabil Shaban. (Originally scheduled but postponed from 9 March)
- 23 Mar 1992: Craig Charles.
