= RT UK =

Defunct English language television channel

- Country: United Kingdom
- Broadcast area: United Kingdom
- Network: RT
- Headquarters: Millbank Tower, London

Programming
- Language: English
- Picture format: 1080i HDTV (downscaled to 16:9 576i for the SDTV feed)

Ownership
- Owner: (ANO) TV-Novosti (on behalf of Russia Today TV UK Limited)
- Sister channels: RT International; RT America (formerly); RT France; RT Arabic; RT Documentary; RT en Español; RT Deutsch (formerly)

History
- Launched: 30 October 2014
- Closed: 2 March 2022

Links
- Website: www.rt.com/uk/

RT UK, also known as Russia Today, was a free-to-air television news channel based in the United Kingdom. It was part of the RT network, a Russian state-controlled international television network funded by the federal tax budget of the Russian government. The channel's head was Nikolay Bogachikhin. Launched in 2014, it ran live broadcasts for seven years and ceased broadcasting from London in July 2021.

RT UK served as the home and production base of RT's UK-based programmes. The channel's studios were located in Millbank Tower. Prior to its closure, the channel offered four hours of its own programming per day, airing RT UK News Monday through Friday at 7 pm, 8 pm, 9 pm and 10 pm. The RT UK News anchors were Bill Dod and Kate Partridge. RT International now broadcasts in its place, though the channel is still available online through RT's websites and social media.

The UK media regulator Ofcom repeatedly found RT to have breached its rules on impartiality and on one occasion found it had broadcast "materially misleading" content. On 18 March 2022, Ofcom cancelled RT's UK broadcasting licence "with immediate effect" after concluding the outlet was not "fit and proper" or a "responsible broadcaster".

== Launch ==
RT UK was launched on 30 October 2014 and closed for TV broadcasting on 30 July 2021. The channel's coverage focused on the United Kingdom. RT presenter Afshin Rattansi stated that the channel's position was "to challenge dominant power structures in Britain by broadcasting live and original programming with a progressive UK focus", and it was "not subject to the metropolitan elite's London bias" since its "news will come from right across the country".

Richard Sambrook, former director of global news at the BBC and director of the Centre of Journalism at Cardiff University was quoted as saying "It's a surprising move to focus resources on the UK. It's not a commercial proposition, therefore the main purpose must be to gain influence. It's about soft power for the Kremlin". In a pre-launch statement, RT correspondent Polly Boiko said "So much is made of how RT is funded. It's been cast as the Big Bad Wolf of the news media landscape," and "I think many of us... see the launch of RT UK as an opportunity to shake off the accusations levelled at the channel".

== Incidents ==
=== Relations with British regulators (2014–19) ===
Ahead of the launch of its UK-specific broadcasts in 2014, RT said that its advertisements promoting the channel had been rejected by ad agencies because it was felt they would violate UK laws on political advertising. The network posted versions of the adverts on billboards and its website with the word "redacted" on them in protest. The UK Advertising Standards Authority said it had not banned the ads or even received any complaint about them.

The UK broadcast regulator Ofcom has repeatedly reprimanded the international version of RT for its failure to remain impartial. In July 2014, London-based RT International correspondent Sara Firth resigned, after five years with the channel, calling its coverage of the MH17 disaster, the "straw that broke the camel's back". Shortly after RT UK was launched, Ofcom said sanctions would be imposed if further breaches of the broadcasting code occurred.

In September 2015, Ofcom found RT in breach of the impartiality rules in its coverage of events in Ukraine and Syria. It also upheld the complaint by the BBC that allegations made in an episode of The Truthseeker that a BBC Panorama film, Saving Syria's Children, had faked parts of a report on a chemical weapon attack in Syria were "materially misleading". Another episode of The Truthseeker, named "Genocide of Eastern Ukraine", stated that the Ukrainian government was deliberately bombing civilians, had murdered and tortured journalists, and had crucified babies. Ukrainian army forces were accused of "ethnic cleansing" and were compared to Nazis during World War Two. The only response to these allegations shown in the broadcast was a caption reading, "Kiev claims it is not committing genocide, denies casualty reports", which appeared on screen for six seconds. According to Ofcom, the broadcast had "little or no counterbalance or objectivity". A spokesperson for the media regulator said "Ofcom found that RT broadcast content that was either materially misleading or not duly impartial. These are significant failings and we are therefore requiring RT to broadcast two clear statements on our decision which correct these failures".

In December 2018, Ofcom ruled that seven programmes broadcast by RT between 17 March and 26 April of that year, in the wake of the Salisbury nerve agent attacks, had breached the UK's impartiality rules. The BBC reported that RT was "extremely disappointed by Ofcom's conclusions". RT was fined £200,000 but kept its licence to broadcast in the UK.

=== Threatened closure of banking facilities ===
In October 2016, RT published a letter sent to "Russia Today TV UK Ltd" by NatWest bank informing the company that it intended to cease the banking facilities provided to the company. RT's editor in Moscow, Margarita Simonyan, tweeted in Russian "They closed our accounts in Britain. All of them. 'Decision not to be discussed'. Long live freedom of speech!" Russian MPs, the foreign ministry, and human rights officials condemned the move.

The Russian embassy in London described the move as an "openly political decision". The British government, which owned the majority of shares in the group since the 2008 financial crisis, denied responsibility for the bank's actions. NatWest subsequently said that it had written to one of RT's suppliers, not to the station itself, and that it would review the decision. RT said the supplier provided all RT services in the UK.

While RT and Russian officials framed NatWest's actions as politically motivated, an alternative explanation proposed in a RUSI article was that the threatened closure was more likely due to compliance concerns, such as transparency around People with Significant Control requirements. RT itself acknowledged that its UK arm received funding from the Russia state; however, there was no evidence of a transparent institutional link to Russia. RT UK was registered in the UK and its director and sole shareholder was a British individual, Christopher Wood, as later reported by The Independent. This organisational structure may have raised questions for NatWest, although its decision to end banking services was reversed in late January 2017.

=== Criticism of coverage (2016–2022) ===
Oliver Kamm wrote in The Times in October 2016: "For purportedly expert analysis of world events, RT turns to an assortment of racists, neo-Nazis, UFO buffs, 9/11 conspiracy theorists and obscure fantasists. Admittedly it's also been commended for balance and fairness – by the British National Party". He continued: "This is not a normal news outlet but a conspiracy of fraudsters in the service of a murderous autocracy". In The Observer, Nick Cohen wrote in November 2014 that the channel "feeds the huge western audience that wants to believe that human rights are a sham and democracy a fix. Believe that and you will ask: what right have we to criticise Putin? At least he is honest in his way".

In late February 2022, following Russia's invasion of Ukraine, a number of British journalists based in RT's offices in Moscow and at RT UK's offices in London resigned from the network in response to its coverage of the incident. Former First Minister of Scotland Alex Salmond suspended his RT talk show, The Alex Salmond Show, on 24 February after receiving public criticism following the invasion. According to The Times, four journalists "publicly announced their resignation, while others are said to have quietly left RT's London bureau". YouTube banned access to all RT and Sputnik channels on the platform from Europe and Britain. (Note: Although videos and channels may appear in search results, the videos are unwatchable, with UK users given the message: "This channel is not available in your country".)

On 2 March 2022, RT UK's SD Freeview channel 234 went off the air in the afternoon, with RT HD on Freeview channel 113 following an hour later at about 4:45pm. Both channels were replaced by a placeholder message saying that the service was unavailable. On the same day, Sky removed channel 511, which hosted RT, due to the ongoing situation in Ukraine.

=== Ofcom revocation of licence (2022) ===
In 2022, following the invasion of Ukraine by Russia, Ofcom looked into whether RT had breached impartiality rules regarding its coverage of the conflict. Although the European Union proposed banning the channel across all its member states, (Note: RT DE, RT's German subsidiary, was banned in Germany during the lead-up to the invasion.) this was opposed by Liz Truss, then British foreign secretary, who feared it may lead to a retaliatory ban on the BBC and other British news outlets in Russia.

Ofcom revoked RT's UK broadcasting licence "with immediate effect" on 18 March 2022 after concluding the outlet was not "fit and proper" or a "responsible broadcaster". In particular, Ofcom said that Russian laws against disinformation concerning the Russian invasion of Ukraine meant that RT could not report the invasion responsibly. At the time of the ruling, Ofcom had 29 open investigations regarding RT's coverage of the invasion. The ruling only concerned the right to broadcast in the UK; RT's ability to broadcast online was not affected. Kremlin spokesperson Dmitry Peskov criticised the ban, saying it was "continuing the anti-Russian madness that is happening in America and Europe".

== RT UK programming ==
- Going Underground (2014–2022) with Afshin Rattansi
- In the Now (Anissa Naouai)
- Keiser Report (2009–2022) with Max Keiser
- Sam Delaney's News Thing (2015–2018) with Sam Delaney
- Sputnik (2013–2022) with George Galloway
- The Alex Salmond Show (2017–2022) with Alex Salmond
- Venture Capital (Katie Pilbeam)

== RT programmes on RT UK ==
- Boom Bust (Ameera David, Bianca Facchinei, & Edward Harrison) from RT America
- CrossTalk and On the Money (Peter Lavelle) from RT International
- Larry King Now (Larry King) from RT America
- Politicking (Larry King) from RT America
- Redacted Tonight (Lee Camp) from RT America
- Watching the Hawks (Tyrel Ventura, Sean Stone, & Tabetha Wallace) from RT America
- SophieCo (Sophie Shevardnadze) from RT International
- The Big Picture with Thom Hartmann (Thom Hartmann) from RT America
- Worlds Apart (Oksana Boyko) from RT International

== On air staff ==
News anchors

- Bill Dod (2014–2021)
- Kate Partridge

Correspondents

- Laura Smith (2015–2018)
- Polly Boiko (2015–)
- Anastasia Churkina
