= Luke Graham (politician) =

British politician

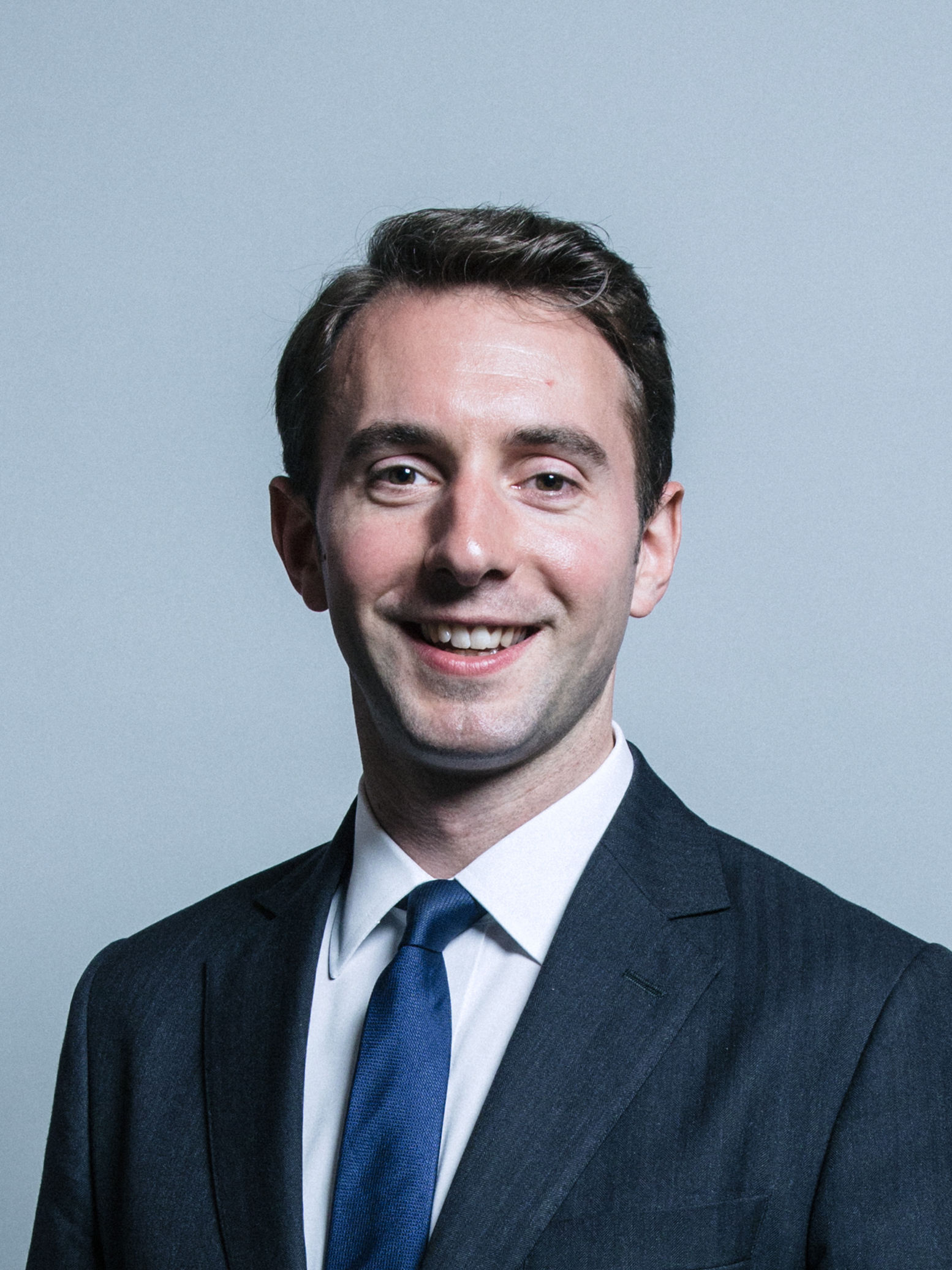
- Official portrait, 2017

Member of Parliament for Ochil and South Perthshire
- In office 8 June 2017 – 6 November 2019
- Preceded by: Tasmina Ahmed-Sheikh
- Succeeded by: John Nicolson

Personal details
- Born: Luke Patrick Graham; June 1985 (age 41) Swindon, Wiltshire, England
- Party: Conservative
- Education: University of Sheffield
- Profession: Accountant

Luke Patrick Graham (born 17 June 1985) is a British Conservative Party politician who served as the Member of Parliament for Ochil and South Perthshire from 2017 to 2019.

From September 2018, Graham served in the role of Parliamentary private secretary (PPS) to the Cabinet Office. He was later made PPS to the Ministry of Housing, Communities and Local Government. He held both positions concurrently until the end of the Second May Ministry.

== Early life ==
Graham was born in Eldene, Swindon, Wiltshire in June 1985 and was educated at the Dorcan Academy, the local comprehensive. He graduated from the University of Sheffield with a BA in Economics and Social Policy in 2006. Graham graduated with 2.1 Dual Honours, before serving as the Finance Officer of Sheffield University Union from 2006-07.

Prior to entering the Commons, he worked for Tesco plc for five and a half years whilst gaining his Chartered Institute for Management Accounting qualification. During his tenure, he worked in the UK, Thailand and China. After Tesco, Graham joined Tough Mudder, a British firm launched in the US. He later accepted a job as a senior manager at Marks and Spencer plc and returned to the UK.

Graham started his own accountancy business, Tech & The Beancounters, in 2016.

== Political career ==
Graham first entered Scottish politics in 2014, when he actively campaigned for Better Together, the unionist campaign during the 2014 Scottish independence referendum. Graham was subsequently selected to contest the constituency of Ochil and South Perthshire at the 2015 general election, and finished in third place.

Graham was the Director of Finance of Britain Stronger in Europe, the official Remain campaign in the 2016 EU Membership Referendum.

Graham was reselected to contest the Ochil and South Perthshire seat during the 2017 general election. He defeated the sitting Scottish National Party MP, Tasmina Ahmed-Sheikh. Graham successfully overturned Ahmed-Sheikh's 10,168 majority to win by 3,359 votes.

In November 2018 he was the recipient of a £25,000 donation from Lord Sainsbury of Turville, which was donated to the Scottish Conservative Party for Graham's association.

He voted in favour of former Prime Minister Theresa May's deal to leave the European Union.

Graham backed Michael Gove during the Conservative leadership contest.

He was a member of the Public Accounts Committee from September 2017 until October 2018 and subsequently served as a member of the Finance Committee for the House of Commons.

Causes that Graham worked extensively on included renewable energy (particularly geothermal), domestic abuse, and farming.

In March 2019, a staff member working in Graham's constituency office was threatened by two men who allegedly said that "in an independent Scotland all of you will be hanging", banging on windows and shouting at the staffer. Police Scotland stated they would be making inquiries. Later that month, the police issued descriptions of individuals they would like to speak to relating to the incident.

Seeking re-election at the 2019 general election on 12 December 2019, Graham lost his seat to the Scottish National Party's John Nicolson, who was previously the MP for East Dunbartonshire from 2015-17.

Although Graham lost his seat, the Conservative Party won the general election in a landslide. Following his personal defeat, he was appointed to head a "Union unit" in 10 Downing Street, which gave him responsibility for supporting unionism and opposing Scottish independence. Graham was replaced in February 2021 by Oliver Lewis.

Parliament of the United Kingdom
Preceded by Tasmina Ahmed-Sheikh	Member of Parliament for Ochil and South Perthshire; 2017–2019	Succeeded by John Nicolson
