= Dinosaur (TV series) =

Scottish Television series

- Genre: Comedy drama
- Created by: Matilda Curtis; Ashley Storrie
- Written by: Matilda Curtis; Ashley Storrie; Kat Rose Martin; Robin Boreham
- Directed by: Niamh McKeown
- Starring: Ashley Storrie; Kat Ronney
- Original language: English
- No. of series: 2
- No. of episodes: 12

Production
- Executive producers: Sarah Hammond; Katie Churchill; Harry Williams; Jack Williams; Catriona Renton; Emma Lawson; Gavin Smith; Daniel Walker
- Producer: Brian Coffey
- Running time: 30 minutes
- Production company: Two Brothers

Original release
- Network: Hulu; BBC Scotland; BBC Three
- Release: 5 April 2024 – present

Dinosaur is a British comedy drama television series set in Glasgow starring Ashley Storrie and Kat Ronney and created by Matilda Curtis and Storrie. It premiered on Hulu and BBC Three in April 2024 and was renewed for a second season later that year following critical acclaim. The second season premiered in February 2026.

== Premise ==
=== Series 1 ===
Autistic paleontologist Nina enjoys her routine life working at The Natural History Museum of Glasgow (based on and filmed at Kelvingrove Art Gallery and Museum) and living with her sister Evie, but is shaken when Evie suddenly announces she is engaged to a stranger.

=== Series 2 ===
Following the end of series 1, Nina has taken up a palaeontology role on an Isle of Wight dig site. After her role on site ends and she finally returns to Scotland, there's been considerable change since she left eight months earlier – with work, family and relationships all impacted.

== Cast and characters ==
=== Main characters ===
Series 1 & 2

- Ashley Storrie as Nina McArthur, an autistic paleontologist
- Kat Ronney as Evie, Nina's sister
- Danny Ashok as Ranesh, Evie's husband
- Lorn Macdonald as Lee, a barista and Nina's love interest
- David Carlyle as Bo McArthur, Nina and Evie's brother
- Sally Howitt as Diane McArthur, mother to Bo, Evie and Nina
- Greg Hemphill as Ade McArthur, father to Bo, Evie and Nina

Series 2

- Hyoie O'Grady as Clayton, (Note: Clayton appears from series 2 onwards.) an American paleontologist working with Nina on the Isle of Wight, and her other love interest

=== Recurring characters ===
- Sanjeev Kohli as Sachin, Ranesh's dad
- Sabrina Sandhu as Amber, Evie's friend
- Ben Rufus Green as Shane, Nina's boss
- Jim Kitson as Declan, Nina's colleague
- Kate Dickie as Cecily, a dressmaker

== Production ==
The series was commissioned in 2022 by the BBC. It was produced by Two Brothers Pictures in association with All3Media and created by Matilda Curtis and Ashley Storrie from an original idea by Curtis. It has Niamh McKeown as director and Brian Coffey as producer. In May 2023, American streaming service Hulu co-commissioned the series.

Storrie has said playing the role of Nina, a young autistic woman, has helped her in certain ways with her own autism diagnosis. Storrie, speaking in 2024 said it was a liberating experience playing the role of Nina: "The good thing about being Nina is she’s an unmasked autistic person so a lot of the things that take a lot of pressure for me to do every day, to just behave like a normal person, I didn’t have to do. It was good for the brief time we filmed Dinosaur, and that was so nice,” she says.

A second series was commissioned in November 2024.

=== Casting ===
Dinosaur is Storrie's television acting debut, having previously worked in comedy and playing a small role in the Josie Long film Super November (2018).

In August 2023, it was announced that Kat Ronney would appear in the series as Evie with David Carlyle as Bo, and Lorn Macdonald as Lee.

=== Filming ===
Filming began in Scotland in August 2023. Filming in Glasgow was scheduled throughout August and into September 2023. Filming on the second series was underway in June 2025.

== Broadcast ==
Series 1 premiered on Hulu on 5 April 2024. It was first shown on BBC Three on 21 April 2024.

Series 2 launched fully on BBC iPlayer on 5 February 2026, with episodes 1 & 2 broadcast on BBC Scotland (TV channel) on the same day. It was subsequently released on BBC Three on 7 February 2026 and Hulu on 25 February 2026.

== Reception ==
Series 1

Jack Seale in The Guardian gave the show four stars and wrote "This spiky and heartfelt comedy might be powered by the lead character’s autism, but it’s not defined by it. It gives people with the condition a long overdue voice".

In 2024, the series was nominated for four BAFTA Scotland awards. Curtis and Storrie won the award for best writers. After its award success, Dinosaur was recommissioned for a second series.

Series 2

Chitra Ramaswamy in The Guardian gave the show four stars and wrote "It’s refreshing, groundbreaking and absolutely piles up the gags. The return of this Glaswegian sitcom is very welcome indeed"
