= Kings of Comedy (British TV series) =

- Genre: Reality game show
- Presented by: Russell Brand
- Narrated by: Matthew Rudge
- Country of origin: United Kingdom
- Original language: English
- No. of series: 1

Production
- Running time: 30 minutes (inc. adverts)
- Production company: Endemol West

Original release
- Network: Channel 4
- Release: 4 October 2004 – 2004

Kings of Comedy is a reality television game show broadcast made by Endemol West for Channel 4.

The show is presented by Russell Brand and narrated by Matthew Rudge. The premise was that eight comics lived in a Big Brother-style house to try to determine whether old-school comics or the newer generation are best.

The winner (Andrew Maxwell) got the chance to make his own pilot show.

== Contestants ==
=== New comics ===
- Janey Godley
- Boothby Graffoe
- Andrew Maxwell
- Ava Vidal

=== Old comics ===
- Stan Boardman
- David Copperfield
- Mick Miller
- Scott Capurro
