= Sam Delaney's News Thing =

Current affairs television series

- Genre: Satire
- Created by: RT UK
- Presented by: Sam Delaney
- Original language: English
- No. of seasons: 1
- No. of episodes: 138

Production
- Executive producer: Ben Rigden
- Production location: London

Original release
- Network: RT
- Release: 5 November 2015 – 24 June 2018

Sam Delaney's News Thing was a television programme produced by RT UK and presented by British journalist and broadcaster Sam Delaney, that aired every Saturday night from November 2015 until June 2018.

Notable guest appearances included Ken Livingstone, former mayor of London, Calum Morson, a notable Sunderland AFC fan and John Prescott, Labour peer and former deputy prime minister. A clip of the show that was widely shared online was a prank where a child was dressed up as the Queen to knight Nigel Farage, but had been primed by Delaney to say "My mummy says you hate foreigners." Commenting on the segment, Jim Waterson said it was "unclear" how a show with material like this fitted into the image of RT being a Kremlin propaganda front.

On 3 June 2016, the show was guest hosted by John Prescott and temporarily titled John Prescott's News Thing.

The series was cancelled in 2018 when RT reduced its amount of independently-made output.
