= Sputnik (TV programme) =

- Genre: News and current affairs
- Created by: Associated Press
- Presented by: George Galloway, Gayatri Galloway

Production
- Production location: London

Original release
- Network: RT

Sputnik: Orbiting the world with George Galloway was a weekly television programme on RT UK presented by broadcaster George Galloway and his wife Gayatri. It was produced by Global Media Services, a subsidiary of the American news agency Associated Press. The series began its run on 16 November 2013, but was off-air because of the 2015 general election between 28 March 2015 (71) and 16 May 2015 (72).

In March through June 2021 the show was co-hosted by James Giles for ten weeks. The programme covered world affairs with expert guests in conversation with the programme's hosts. It usually covered two separate stories; one in each half of the 30-minute slot.

Following the beginning of the 2022 Russian invasion of Ukraine, Ofcom revoked RT's UK broadcasting licence "with immediate effect" on 18 March 2022 after concluding the outlet was not "fit and proper" or a "responsible broadcaster"; thus, Galloway's program came to an end.

== Notable guests ==
- Gilad Atzmon, Israeli-born musician and political activist.
- Vince Cable, Liberal Democrat politician.
- David Davis, British Conservative Party politician.
- Nigel Farage, then leader of the UK Independence Party.
- Rob Griffiths, General Secretary of the Communist Party of Britain.
- Lee Jasper, political activist.
- Steve Keen, economist and author.
- Seumas Milne, associate editor of The Guardian.
- Peter Oborne, British journalist and writer.
- Jacob Rees-Mogg, Conservative MP.
- Jill Stein, presidential candidate for the Green Party of the United States.
- Andy Worthington, historian and investigative journalist.
- Arron Banks, businessman and Leave.EU donor.
