= Strathtay (ward) =

Electoral ward of Perth and Kinross, Scotland

Location of the ward

Strathtay is one of the twelve wards used to elect members of the Perth and Kinross Council. It elects three Councillors.

== Councillors ==
Election	Councillors		
2007	Alisdair Wylie (SNP)	John Kellas (SNP)	Barbara Vaughan (Conservative)
2012	Grant Laing (SNP)	John Kellas (SNP)	Barbara Vaughan (Conservative)
2017	Grant Laing (SNP)	Anne Jarvis (Conservative)	Ian James (Conservative)
2022	Grant Laing (SNP)	Claire McLaren (Liberal Democrats)	Ian James (Conservative)

== Election results ==
=== 2022 Election ===
2022 Perth and Kinross Council election

Strathtay - 3 seats
Party	Candidate	FPv%	Count				
Party	Candidate	FPv%	1	2	3	4	5
SNP	Grant Laing (incumbent)	25.74%	1,328				
SNP	Melanie Kinney	20.72%	1,069	1,101.19	1,107.33	1,114.84	
Conservative	Ian James (incumbent)	18.84%	972	972.4	1,698.57		
Liberal Democrats	Claire McLaren	18.65%	962	964.92	1,020.06	1,231.26	1,821.09
Conservative	Anne Jarvis (incumbent)	16.05%	828	828.54			
Electorate: 9,890 Valid: 5,159 Quota: 1,290 Turnout: 53.3%

=== 2017 Election ===
2017 Perth and Kinross Council election

Strathtay - 3 seats
Party	Candidate	FPv%	Count					
Party	Candidate	FPv%	1	2	3	4	5	6
Conservative	Anne Jarvis	25.28	1,307					
Conservative	Ian James	19.63	1,015	1,027.68	1,066.73	1,090.78	1,222.92	1,236.93
SNP	Grant Laing (incumbent)	19.52	1,009	1,009.15	1,033.15	1,094.15	1,164.17	2,133.22
SNP	John Kellas (incumbent)	18.28	945	945.13	955.13	1,018.13	1,112.13	
Labour	Frank Stevenson	8.96	463	463.28	510.32	593.34		
Green	Elspeth Coutts	4.24	219	219.12	277.16			
Liberal Democrats	Alex Linklater	4.1	212	212.18				
Electorate: TBC Valid: 5,170 Spoilt: 81 Quota: 1,293 Turnout: 5,251 (57.6%)

=== 2012 Election ===
2012 Perth and Kinross Council election

Strathtay - 3 seats
Party	Candidate	FPv%	Count
Party	Candidate	FPv%	1
Conservative	Barbara Vaughan (incumbent)	31.44%	1,003
SNP	John Kellas (incumbent)	28.78%	918
SNP	Grant Laing	25.77%	822
Labour	Anne Chatt	9.50%	303
Liberal Democrats	Neil Henry Gaunt	4.51%	144
Electorate: - Valid: 3,190 Spoilt: 31 Quota: 798 Turnout: 3,221 (%)

=== 2007 Election ===
2007 Perth and Kinross Council election

Perth and Kinross council election, 2007: Strathtay
Party	Candidate	FPv%	Count			
Party	Candidate	FPv%	1	2	3	4
Conservative	Barbara Vaughan	32.7	1,400			
SNP	John Kellas	32.6	1,398			
Liberal Democrats	Alan Livingstone	17.4	747	892	930	
SNP	Alisdair Wylie	17.3	742	782	1,020	1,441
Electorate: 6,998 Valid: 4,287 Spoilt: 80 Quota: 1,072 Turnout: 62.40%
