= The Alex Salmond Show =

Political talk show hosted by Alex Salmond, former First Minister of Scotland

- Genre: Talk show
- Presented by: Alex Salmond
- Starring: Tasmina Ahmed-Sheikh
- Country of origin: United Kingdom
- Original language: English
- No. of seasons: 1

Production
- Executive producer: Maureen Goldthorpe
- Producer: Slainte Media
- Production locations: Millbank Tower, London; Various
- Cinematography: Emil Kunda
- Editors: Tasmina Ahmed-Sheikh; Miren Patel; Gustavo Adolfo; Hass Alkatib
- Camera setup: Jean Jaques Gonfier; Stavros Michaelides; Christian Smith; Rafal Gabzdyl
- Running time: 30 minutes

Original release
- Network: RT (2017‒2022)
- Release: 16 November 2017 – 24 February 2022

The Alex Salmond Show was a UK weekly political talk show hosted by former First Minister of Scotland, Alex Salmond, which premiered on RT on 16 November 2017. The guests included various political and public figures. The show aired every Thursday on RT UK at 07:30, 12:30 and 22:30. The show was produced by Slainte Media, a production company co-owned by Salmond and former SNP MP Tasmina Ahmed-Sheikh. On 24 February 2022, it was announced that the show was suspended on RT until further notice in response to the 2022 Russian invasion of Ukraine.

== History ==
On 9 November 2017, the RT channel (formerly known as Russia Today) launched The Alex Salmond Show, with the first episode airing a week later.

Salmond stated that his performance at the 2017 Edinburgh Fringe Festival as part of his Alex Salmond: Unleashed tour inspired him to create the talk show.

Salmond's successor as Scotland's first minister, Nicola Sturgeon, said she would have advised against his decision to host a programme on RT. Salmond was criticised by Scottish politicians from the other parties for a perceived lack of judgement. The first show was broadcast on 16 November 2017; the main interviewee was Carles Puigdemont, the former president of Catalonia.

On 24 February 2022, the show was suspended until further notice in response to the Russia-Ukraine conflict after Salmond received criticism for not taking action in the days preceding the Russian invasion of Ukraine.

On 11 July 2023, more than a year after the show ended, Salmond started a new show on all social media platforms, Scotland Speaks with Alex Salmond, seen as a natural successor to The Alex Salmond Show that was also hosted by Salmond and Ahmed-Sheikh and produced by Slainte Media. It first aired on 13 July 2023 and featured a similar format to the show albeit having a smaller budget and studio.

In February 2024, the show returned on the Turkish public broadcaster TRT. The first episode included an interview with actor Brian Cox.

== Premise ==
The show typically begins with Alex Salmond greeting the audience then reading tweets, letters and e-mails that are sent in by members of the public. Afterwards, Alex Salmond introduces the State Your Case section of the show where he introduces a fellow guest who expresses their opinions on a certain subject. Salmond and the guest would then discuss and debate on the issue. Tasmina Ahmed-Sheikh then introduces a topical political issue and interviews an individual involved in that subject. Salmond then engages the guest with a friendly chat about the guest's personal life.

== Controversy and criticism ==
=== Broadcast on RT ===
After it was announced that The Alex Salmond Show would be airing on RT, Salmond received cross-party criticism from politicians and journalists who accused him of launching a new programme on a "Kremlin propaganda channel". A number of invited guests (including former Prime Minister David Cameron, House of Commons Speaker, John Bercow and ministers from the Scottish Government) rejected offers to appear on the show as it was being aired on RT.

In the wake of the poisoning of Sergei and Yulia Skripal, critics called for Salmond to cancel The Alex Salmond Show with some raising questions regarding editorial independence. Salmond defended the show and insisted that he had full editorial control of the programme with no interference from RT.

==== Russia-Ukraine conflict criticism ====
Further criticism was drawn of the programme being broadcast on RT in February 2022 in response to the Ukraine-Russia crisis. First Minister of Scotland, Nicola Sturgeon said that it was "appalling" that Salmond was still broadcasting the show on the network. Scottish Liberal Democrat leader Alex Cole-Hamilton called for Salmond's membership of the Privy Council to be revoked in response to his continuation of his role on RT. This was later reiterated by MPs in the House of Commons on 23 February 2022.

On 24 February 2022, Salmond announced that he would suspend the show until further notice in response to the Russian invasion of Ukraine.

=== Ofcom investigation ===
After the first episode had aired, it emerged that tweets and e-mails that Salmond read out on the show had not actually been sent in by members of the public. One was presented as coming from a Twitter account that did not appear to have posted it, while a second only appeared online several hours after the programme was broadcast. After an investigation, the media regulator Ofcom found that the show had breached broadcasting rules by being "materially misleading" and undermining viewers' trust. However, RT criticised Ofcom's investigation and attributed the issue to a "trivial teething problem."
