= Strathallan (ward) =

Electoral ward of Perth and Kinross Council, Scotland

Location of the ward

Strathallan is one of the twelve wards used to elect members of the Perth and Kinross Council. It elects three Councillors.

== Councillors ==
Election	Councillors		
2007	John Law (SNP)	Ann Gaunt (Liberal Democrats)	Murray Lyle (Conservative)
2010 by-	Tom Gray (SNP)	Ann Gaunt (Liberal Democrats)	Murray Lyle (Conservative)
2012	Tom Gray (SNP)	Ann Gaunt (Liberal Democrats)	Murray Lyle (Conservative)
2017	Tom Gray (SNP)	Crawford Reid (Conservative)	Murray Lyle (Conservative)
2022	Steven Carr (SNP)	Crawford Reid (Conservative)	Keith Allen (Conservative)
2024 by-	Steven Carr (SNP)	Alan Watt (Liberal Democrats)	Keith Allen (Conservative)

== Election results ==
=== 2024 By-election ===
Strathallan by-election (26 September 2024) - 1 seat
Party	Candidate	FPv%	Count					
Party	Candidate	FPv%	1	2	3	4	5	6
Conservative	Amanda Runciman	32.1	1,045	1,049	1,123	1,169	1,206	
Liberal Democrats	Alan Watt	30.0	978	1,006	1,035	1,213	1,509	2,110
SNP	Catherine Scott	17.4	568	613	626	696		
Labour	Ken McCracken	11.2	366	382	388			
Reform UK	Ian Thomas	6.0	194	198				
Green	Nettie Sutherland	3.3	107					
Electorate: 9,657 Quota: 1,630 Turnout: 34.0

=== 2022 Election ===
2022 Perth and Kinross Council election

Strathallan - 3 seats
Party	Candidate	FPv%	Count			
Party	Candidate	FPv%	1	2	3	4
Conservative	Keith Allen	29.68%	1,420			
SNP	Steven Carr	21.9%	1,048	1,053.18	1,121.65	1,205.12
Conservative	Crawford Reid (incumbent)	16.97%	812	1,002.65	1,017.43	1,205.42
SNP	Catherine Scott	13.06%	625	626.41	720.57	821.88
Liberal Democrats	Neil Gaunt	11.43%	547	562.39	686.02	
Green	Andrew Lear	6.96%	333	335.67		
Electorate: 9,543 Valid: 4,785 Quota: 1,197 Turnout: 51.5%

=== 2017 Election ===
2017 Perth and Kinross Council election

Strathallan - 3 seats
Party	Candidate	FPv%	Count						
Party	Candidate	FPv%	1	2	3	4	5	6	7
Conservative	Murray Lyle (incumbent)	28.05	1,280						
Conservative	Crawford Reid	23.64	1,079	1,195.76					
SNP	Tom Gray (incumbent)	14.61	667	669.37	670.14	673.14	705.19	736.49	1,279.99
SNP	Mairi MacDonald	12.66	578	579.29	580.0	581	616.26	631.26	
Liberal Democrats	Ann Gaunt (incumbent)	11.79	538	546.52	563.61	565.76	628.41	752.12	788.79
Labour	Fhinan Beyts	5.15	235	235.97	239.95	243.33	266.7		
Green	Bruce Fummey	3.7	169	169.75	171.72	175.92			
Independent	Ron Rose	0.39	18	18.86	22.27				
Electorate: TBC Valid: 4,564 Spoilt: 78 Quota: 1,142 Turnout: 4,642 (54.5%)

=== 2012 Election ===
2012 Perth and Kinross Council election

Strathallan - 3 seats
Party	Candidate	FPv%	Count			
Party	Candidate	FPv%	1	2	3	4
Conservative	Murray Lyle (incumbent)	34.02%	1,064			
SNP	Tom Gray (incumbent)	24.62%	770	790		
Liberal Democrats	Ann Gaunt (incumbent)	17.99%	563	700	701	852
SNP	Brian Sculthorp	13.40%	419	426	432	481
Labour	Dave MacLurg	9.97%	312	327	328	
Electorate: - Valid: 3,128 Spoilt: 46 Quota: 783 Turnout: 3,174 (%)

=== 2010 By-election ===
Strathallan by-election, 6 May 2010
Party	Candidate	FPv%	Count				
Party	Candidate	FPv%	1	2	3	4	5
Conservative	John Blackie	33.42	1,713	1,724	1,785	2,208	
SNP	Tom Gray	30.34	1,555	1,569	1,769	2,299	3,302
Liberal Democrats	Neil Gaunt	20.33	1,042	1,057	1,321		
Labour	Alistair Munro	14.71	754	762			
Independent	Chris Rennie	1.19	61				
SNP hold		Swing					
Electorate: 7,642 Valid: 5,125 Spoilt: 54 Quota: 2,563.5 Turnout: 67.8%

=== 2007 Election ===
2007 Perth and Kinross Council election

Perth and Kinross council election, 2007: Strathallan
Party	Candidate	FPv%	Count							
Party	Candidate	FPv%	1	2	3	4	5	6	7	8
SNP	John Law	25.2	1,163							
Conservative	Murray Lyle	15.6	842	845	847	870	897	1,379		
Conservative	John Wilson	14.8	666	667	673	683	696			
Independent	Colin Young	13.5	609	611	636	658	697	773	882	
Liberal Democrats	Ann Gaunt	12.0	541	548	556	654	830	883	941	1,229
Labour	Anne Chatt	8.9	402	405	405	439				
Green	Hilary Halley	5.0	225	231	234					
Independent	Jock Stewart	1.2	53	55						
Electorate: 7,586 Valid: 4,501 Spoilt: 55 Quota: 1,126 Turnout: 60.06%
