= Max Keiser =

American-Salvadoran broadcaster and filmmaker

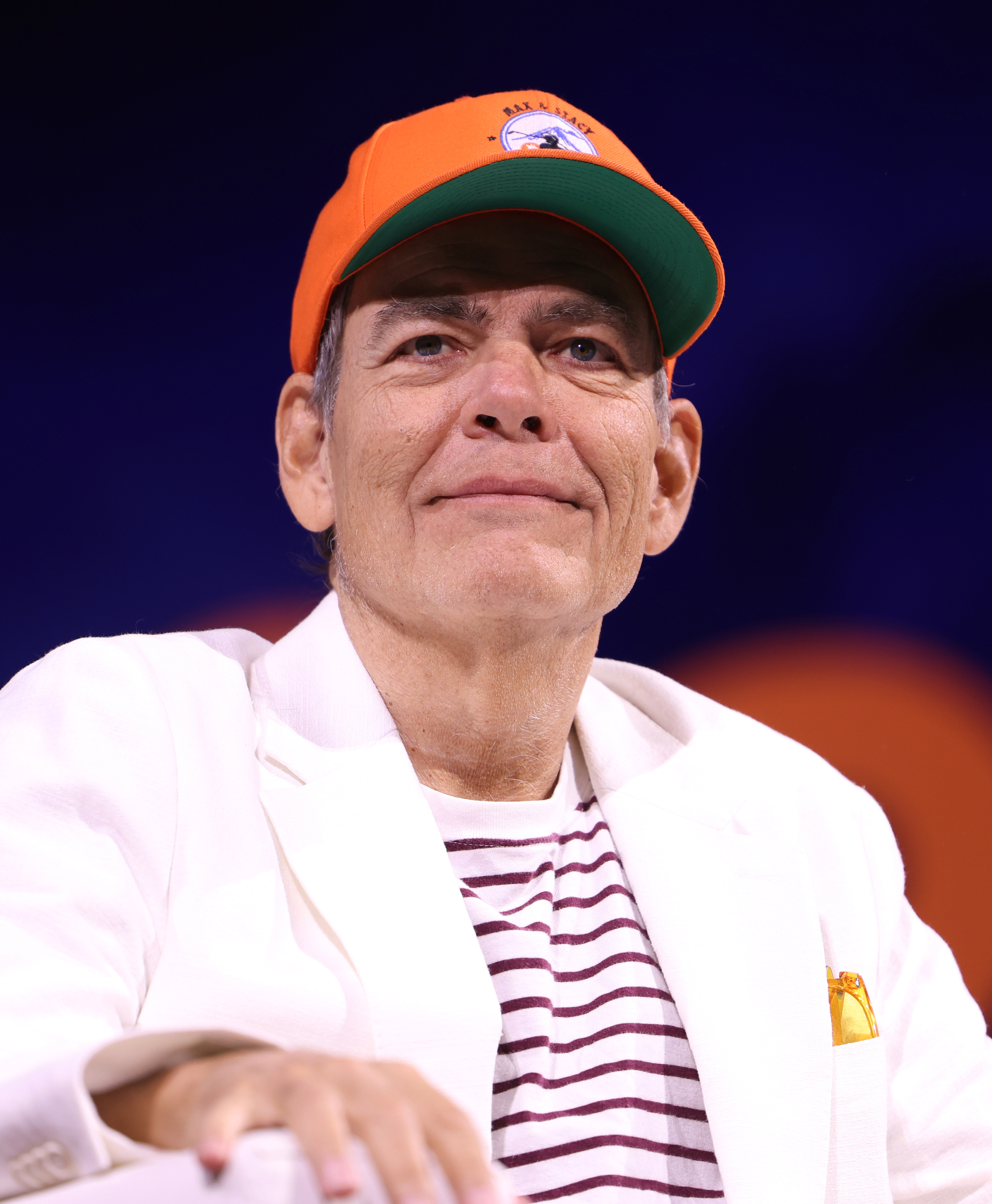
- Keiser in 2025
- Born: Timothy Maxwell Keiser; New Rochelle, New York, United States
- Education: New York University
- Occupation: Journalist
- Notable credit(s): Hollywood Stock Exchange, People & Power, Karmabanque
- Political party: Nuevas Ideas
- Spouse: Stacy Herbert
- Website: maxkeiser.com

Timothy Maxwell "Max" Keiser is an American-Salvadoran broadcaster and filmmaker. He produced and appeared in the TV series People & Power on the Al-Jazeera English network from 2006, and became known for hosting Keiser Report, a financial program broadcast on RT that featured heterodox economics theories, from September 2009 to February 2022. He presented a season of The Oracle with Max Keiser on BBC World News in 2009. Until November 2012, Keiser anchored On the Edge, a program of news and analysis hosted by Iran's Press TV.

Alongside his wife Stacy Herbert, he co-hosted the weekly economics programme Double Down on Radio Sputnik, presented a weekly show about finance and markets on London's Resonance FM, and wrote for The Huffington Post. He lived in London from about 2011 for some years.

As of 2023 he was serving as a personal advisor on matters related to cryptocurrency to Salvadoran president Nayib Bukele in connection to Bitcoin investment in the country, and Stacy claims to be employed by the government of El Salvador.

== Early life and education ==
Timothy Maxwell "Max" Keiser was born in New Rochelle, New York, United States. He grew up in Westchester County, New York.

After studying theatre at New York University, he took a variety of jobs in stand-up comedy and in radio, a part-time job as a stockbroker in the 1980s at Paine Webber, and at the midtown office of Oppenheimer and Co. Inc. under David Tufts.

== Hollywood Stock Exchange ==
Keiser is the creator, co-founder, and former CEO of HSX Holdings/Hollywood Stock Exchange, later sold to Cantor Fitzgerald. Alongside Michael R. Burns, he co-invented the Virtual Specialist platform on which the Hollywood Stock Exchange operates. This technology allows traders to exchange virtual securities, such as "MovieStocks" and "StarBonds", with convertible virtual currency, the "Hollywood Dollar". In 1998 Digital Coast Reporter recognized Keiser as one of Los Angeles' top 50 internet executives for his work on this project.

== Broadcasting career ==
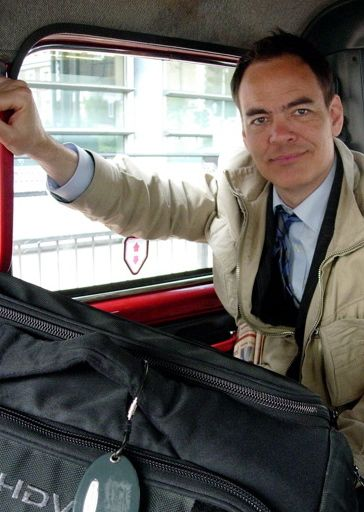
Max Keiser in a London taxi (2007)

Keiser presented Rumble at the Box Office for NBC's Access Hollywood. He also produced and hosted the weekly talk show Buy, Sell, Hold for CBS radio's KLSX in Los Angeles, CA. He also presented The Truth About Markets on Resonance 104.4 FM in London, but the show is no longer listed on their website as of at least June 2022.

=== People & Power ===
Keiser produced 10 short documentary films covering aspects of financial markets for Al Jazeera's series People & Power. The films include Rigged Markets, Money Geyser, Death of the Dollar, Peaked, Extraordinary Antics, Savers vs Speculators, Banking On It, Private Finance or Public Swindle? and Focus on Locusts.

=== The Oracle with Max Keiser (BBC) ===
A pilot episode was produced for Al-Jazeera English titled The Oracle. The show was developed into a series for BBC World News. The series first aired on January 9, 2009. Keiser left the BBC after ten episodes. On Twitter, he said he left because he was ordered not to mention Israel in any context.

He also hosted the New Year's Eve special The Keiser's Business Guide to 2010 for BBC Radio 5 Live.

=== On the Edge ===
A weekly half-hour financial commentary show that started in 2009 and broadcast on Press TV.

=== The Keiser Report ===
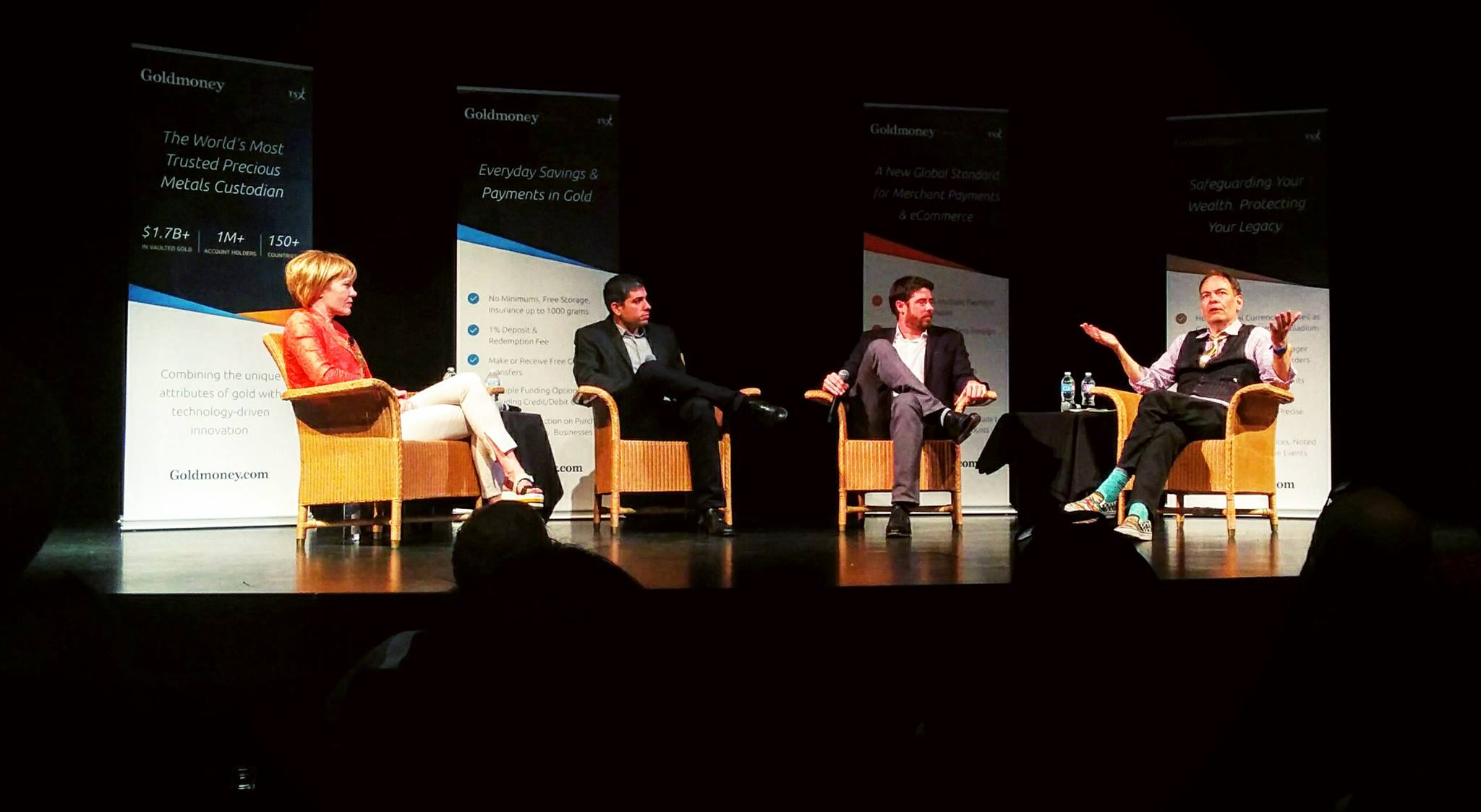
Max Keiser and Stacy Herbert at a Goldmoney talk, Toronto, Canada

From September 2009 until February 2022, Keiser hosted The Keiser Report with financial news and analysis, on the RT network. The 30-minute program is produced three times a week. Stacy Herbert (Keiser's wife) was the co-host; she bantered with Keiser on headlines and commentary. Most episodes are divided into two parts. In the first half, Keiser and Herbert alternately discussed a current financial topic, commented on financial media reports, and provided commentary on the actions of bankers. The second half featured a guest interview, either face-to-face in the studio or through video conferencing, conducted by Keiser.

An episode broadcast in September 2011 featured an interview with comedian Roseanne Barr, who satirically stated that her solution to the financial crisis was to "bring back the guillotine".

The show's guests regularly included advocates for and entrepreneurs working in the cryptocurrency and blockchain fields.

The show ended in February 2022 after Keiser and Herbert resigned from RT and deleted previous pro-Russian statements in response to changes in the media landscape following the 2022 Russian invasion of Ukraine.

=== Financial punditry ===
Keiser has appeared as a financial pundit on a number of news networks. Keiser called for a "fatwā" against Hank Paulson on Al Jazeera in response to the Troubled Asset Relief Program (TARP). In a later broadcast Keiser said, "Paulson stinks". Keiser has advised investors to buy bitcoin and precious metals such as gold and silver, in order to undermine "the banksters". In November 2012, he predicted that the UK pound was about to collapse.

== Activism ==
=== Karmabanque ===
Keiser founded the hedge fund Karmabanque, which sought to profit from any decline in equity value of companies that are susceptible to boycott from environmental groups. The hedge fund's progress was followed monthly in The Ecologist magazine. Its targets included Coca-Cola and McDonald's.

The Karmabanque hedge fund project was designed to simultaneously short-sell companies while funneling profits into environmental and ethical-business pressure groups that further act to drive down the companies' stock prices. Describing the project, Keiser stated, "The Internet allows people, activists, from all over the world to gather, or swarm, and hit a company where it hurts most—in their stock price."

The Guardian newspaper described Keiser's Karmabanque hedge fund as a "fantastical scheme" and accused him of trying to exist "beyond the normal forces and controls of society". A spokesman for Ryanair said, "Since they put Ryanair on their list, our share price has gone up by 10 percent. We are always delighted to be part of a list which includes Coca-Cola, Starbucks, and Wal-Mart."

=== Extraordinary Antics ===
In the Al-Jazeera short film Extraordinary Antics, Keiser traveled to Milan and Venice to find out how Central Intelligence Agency station chief Robert Seldon Lady and his fellow CIA agents spent $500,000 on a procedure known as extraordinary rendition, an illegal practice that resulted in an Egyptian citizen, who had been granted asylum in Italy, being abducted and tortured in Cairo.

The CIA was prosecuted for the case and Robert Seldon Lady was found guilty in a Milan court. He was sentenced on November 9, 2009 to nine years in prison, according to The Guardian. This verdict was upheld on appeal, but the US refuses to extradite Lady to Italy.

=== Crash JP Morgan—buy silver ===
Keiser has labeled JPMorgan Chase "the biggest financial terrorist on Wall Street" in relation to their alleged manipulation of the price of silver. Keiser created a campaign called "Crash JP Morgan—buy silver", whereby people buy silver bullion, thus raising its price and leaving JP Morgan with a huge short position to cover, the margin of which are collateralized by JPMorgan's own stock price, bankrupting itself. The campaign was introduced on the Alex Jones Radio show in November 2010. Writing in The Guardian in December 2010, Keiser suggested that the text "crash jp morgan buy silver" should be used as a googlebomb to virally promote the campaign.

Adweek magazine described Keiser as "the most visible character in an underground movement that has spurred hundreds of blog posts and videos, and played some small part in driving up the price of precious metals".

Keiser drew criticism at the 2000 ShowBiz Expo in Las Vegas when he said of media content that "Everything is inescapably going to a price point called free." In response, Kevin Tsujihara, executive vice president of New Media at Warner Bros., commented that "Piracy.com" will be the victor if superior content is available on sites supported by advertisements.

In 2005, Steven Milloy, the "Junk Science" commentator, demanded that Keiser be removed from the panel of the Triple Bottom Line Investing conference, where he was scheduled to appear. Milloy accused Keiser of making threats against his organization and petitioned sponsors Calvert Investments and KLD Research & Analytics to withdraw from the project. Robert Rubenstein, founder of conference organiser Brooklyn Bridge, stated that Keiser's comments "do not constitute a threat to person or property and are not related to the conference or the content that will be presented there".

The Atlantic magazine's The Wire website speculated that a Downfall parody video created to promote Keiser's campaign was implicated in the sacking of Grant Williams, the Asia equity trading head at J.P. Morgan.

=== El Salvador ===
From the end of 2022, both Max Keiser and his wife Stacy Herbert have served as bureaucrats at the head of the National Bitcoin Office of El Salvador, a country that adopted Bitcoin as its official currency.

== Personal life ==
Keiser married Stacy Herbert, a former Canadian television presenter of the Keiser Report on RT, and Double Down on Radio Sputnik.

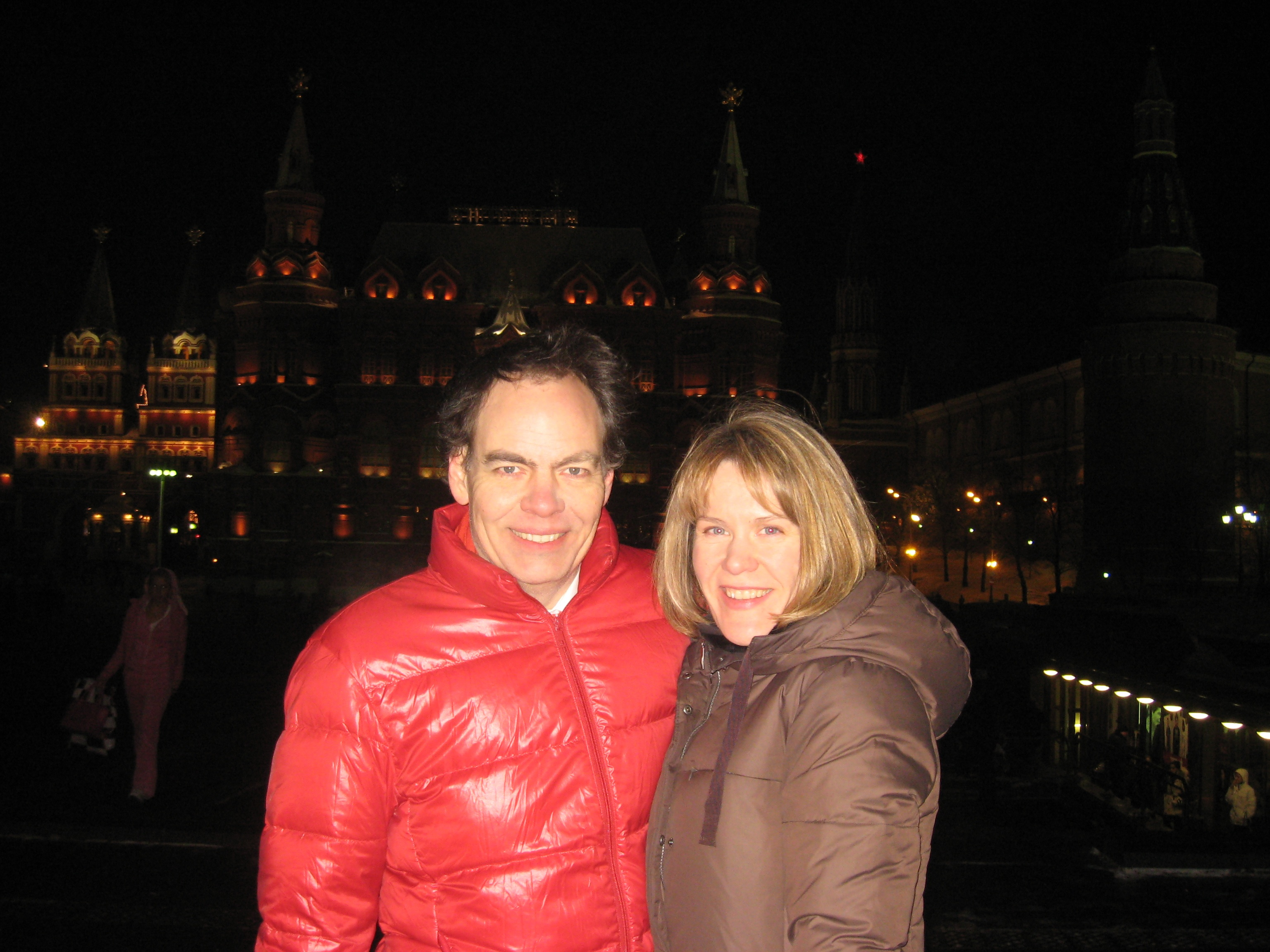
Max and Stacy outside the Kremlin

== See also ==
- Error account – a term often mentioned by Max Keiser
