= Afshin Rattansi =

British journalist and author (born 1968)

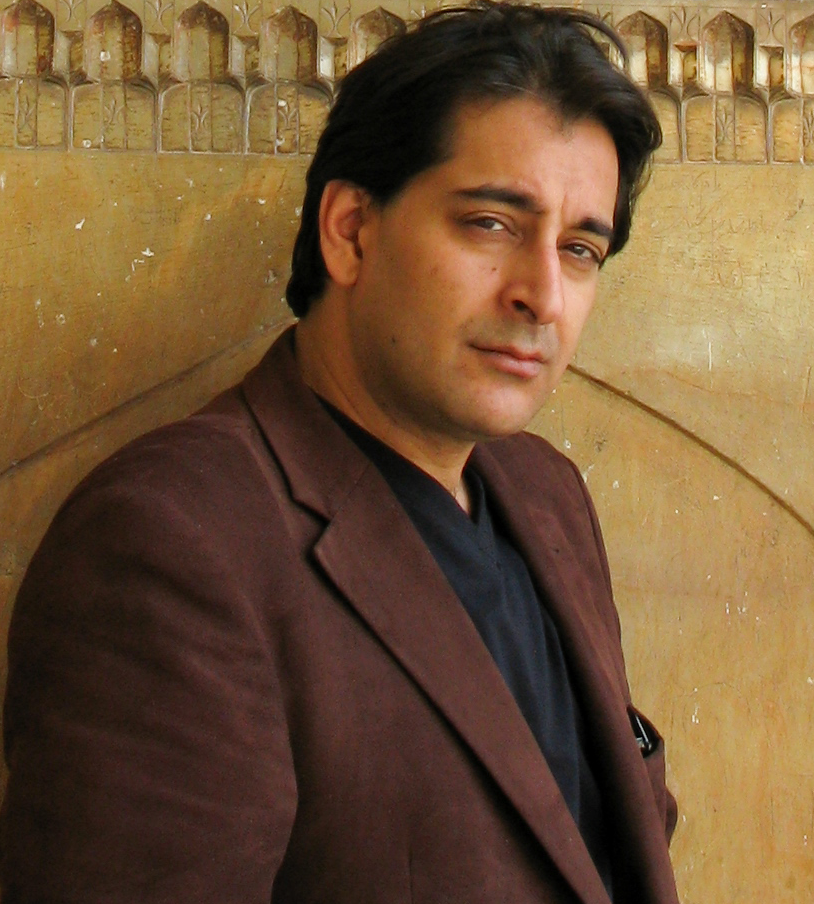
- Rattansi in 2008
- Born: 1968 (age 57–58); Cambridge, England
- Occupations: Broadcaster, journalist
- Years active: 1988–present
- Employer(s): The Guardian, Channel 4, Dubai Business Channel, Today (BBC Radio 4), Al Jazeera Arabic, Press TV, RT
- Notable work: The Dream of the Decade: The London Novels
- Television: Rattansi & Ridley; Double Standards; Going Underground
- Relatives: Shihab Rattansi (brother)
- Website: afshinrattansi.com

Afshin Rattansi (born 1968) is a British broadcaster, journalist and author who presents Going Underground broadcast around the world except in the UK and EU and New Order for Ghaf TV Productions, on networks including the RT network, formerly known as Russia Today.

== Early life ==
Rattansi was born in Cambridge, England, in 1968, the son of immigrant parents, Prof. Pyarally Mohamedally Rattansi and Zarin Miraly Charania, who had married in London two years before. His father – late emeritus Professor of History and Philosophy of Science at University College London – was born in Kenya, one of the ten children of a tea planter, and the Rattansi family had originally come there from Chavand, a village in Kathiawar, Gujarat, India.

== Career ==
Rattansi began his career as a columnist for The Guardian before working on Britain's Channel 4 primetime documentary series executive produced by Tariq Ali and Darcus Howe, commissioned by Farukh Dhondy and Waldemar Januszczak.

He has also worked for the Today programme on BBC Radio 4, Channel 4, Al Jazeera, CNN International, Press TV and Bloomberg. He was the launch Business Editor of the Dubai Business Channel. He was also the first English-language producer at Qatar's Al Jazeera Television Network He contributed twice to the scholarly journal, Critical Quarterly in 2003-4.

His work appeared in the 1994 Penguin Books anthology, Brought to Book and his quartet The Dream of the Decade was published in 2005. He wrote occasional articles for CounterPunch between 2009 and 2019.

Rattansi was a guest panelist in a 2018 edition of the BBC's Question Time in which the poisoning of Sergei and Yulia Skripal was discussed. Referring to Keir Starmer, Rattansi asked: "Why is it that neo-con, neo-liberal Labour Party members continue to try and use WMDs to push us into war?"

In 2022, Afshin Rattansi founded the production company Ghaf TV Productions in the United Arab Emirates where quarter of a century before he was the founding Business Editor of the Dubai Business Channel.

He now co-hosts a current affairs YouTube show Forecast News with Millie Pinch.

== Filmography ==
=== Television ===
Today programme (BBC Radio 4)	2002–2003
Press TV News	2007–2008
Rattansi & Ridley (with Yvonne Ridley)	2008–2010
Alternate Reality	2011
Double Standards	2011–2013
Going Underground	2013–

=== Documentaries ===
Year	Documentary
2012	Eritrea: A Nation In Isolation

== Books ==
- Afshin Rattansi, The Dream of the Decade: the London Novels (London: BookSurge, 2006)
