= List of places in Perth and Kinross =

Map of places in Perth and Kinross compiled from this list

This list of places in Perth and Kinross is a list of links for any town, village, hamlet, castle, golf course, historic house, nature reserve, reservoir, river, canal, and other place of interest in the Perth and Kinross council area of Scotland.

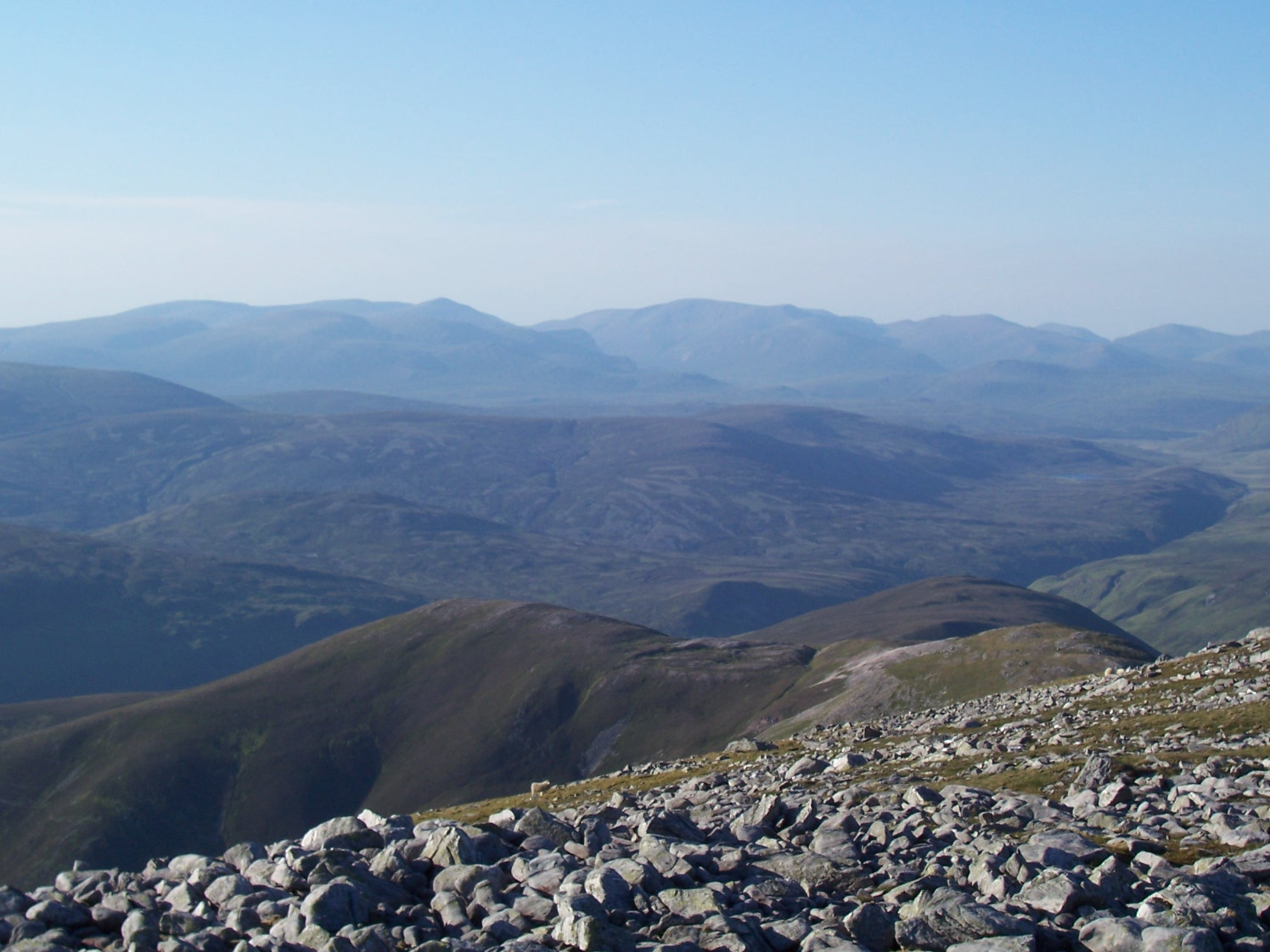
Beinn a Ghlo, Grampians

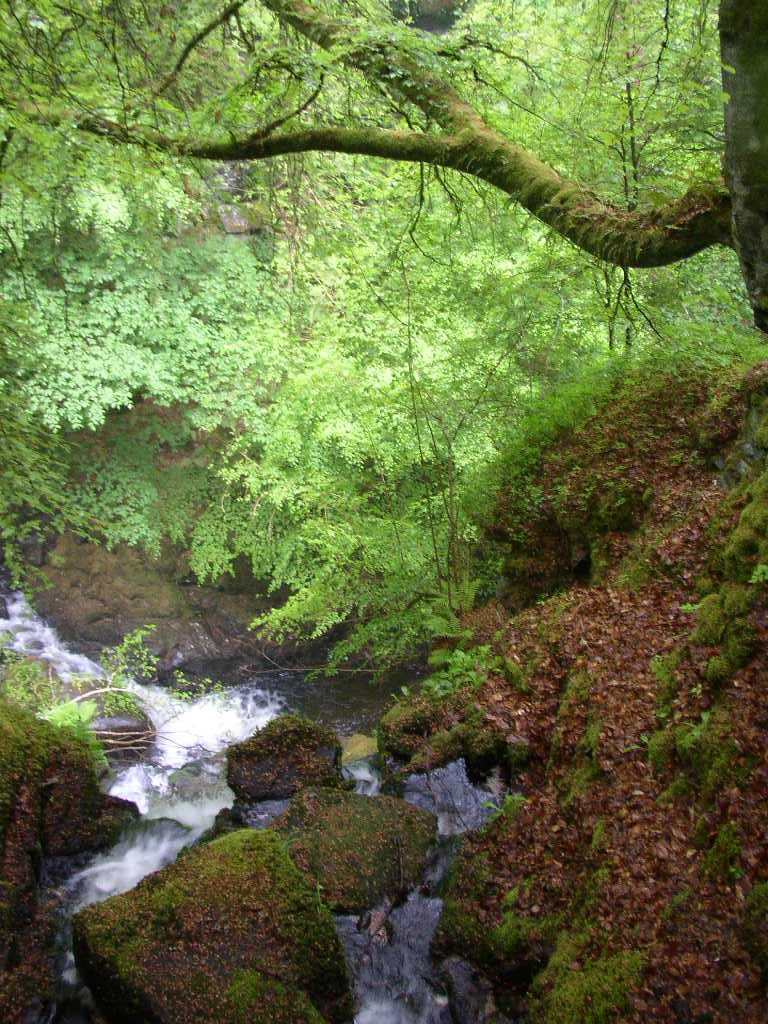
Birks of Aberfeldy

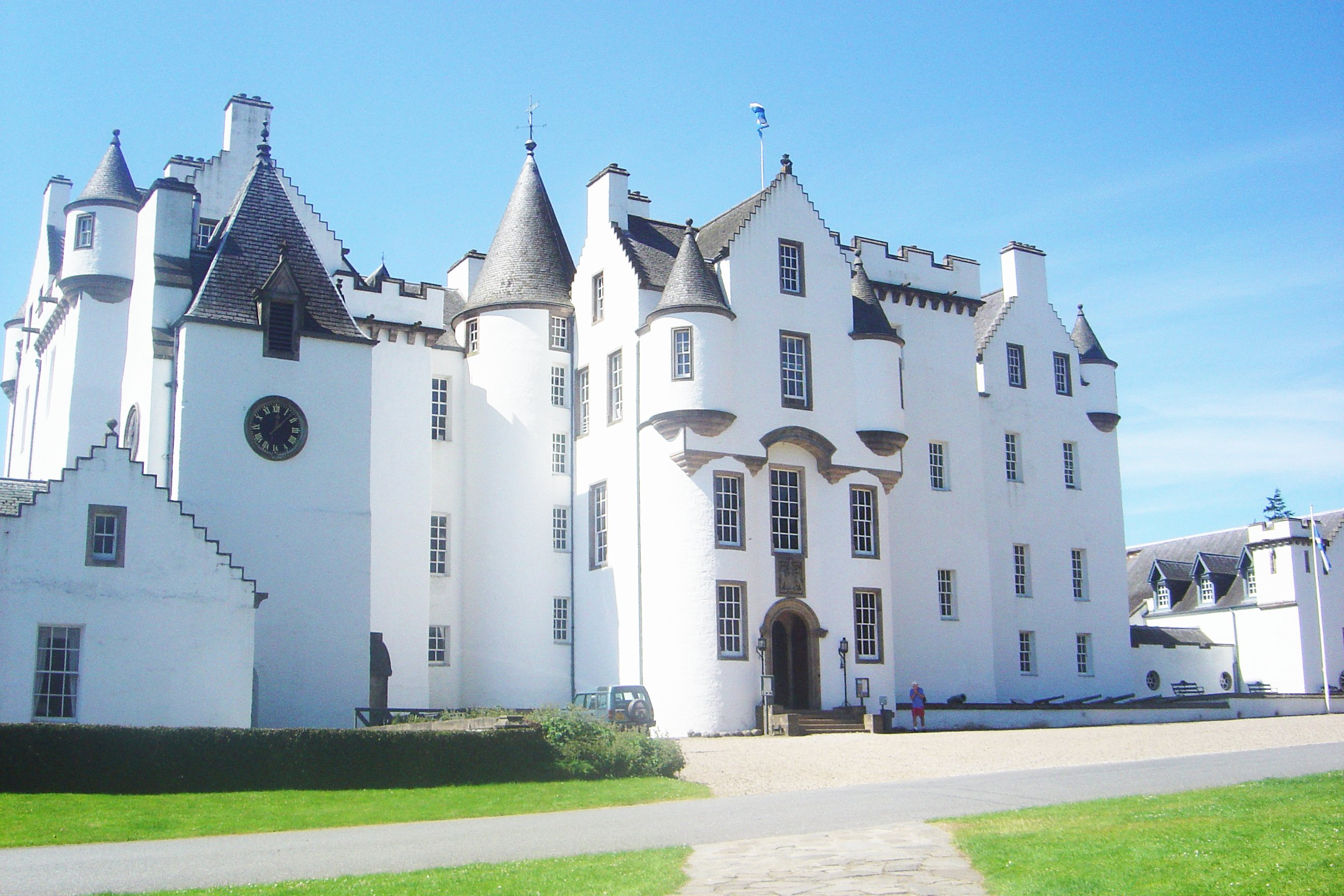
Blair Castle

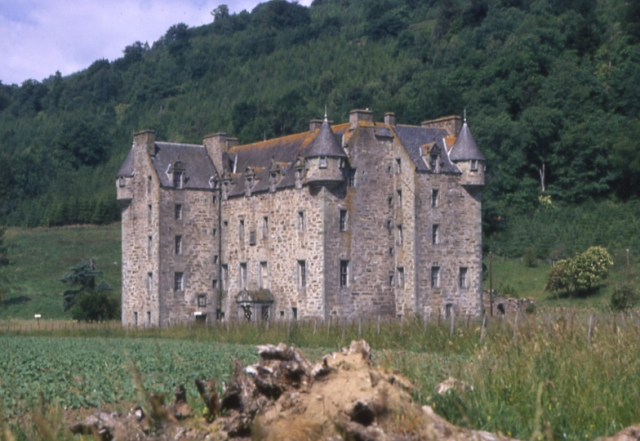
Castle Menzies

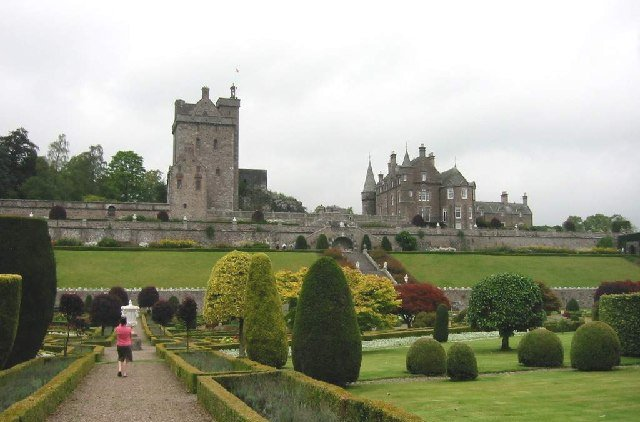
Drummond Castle

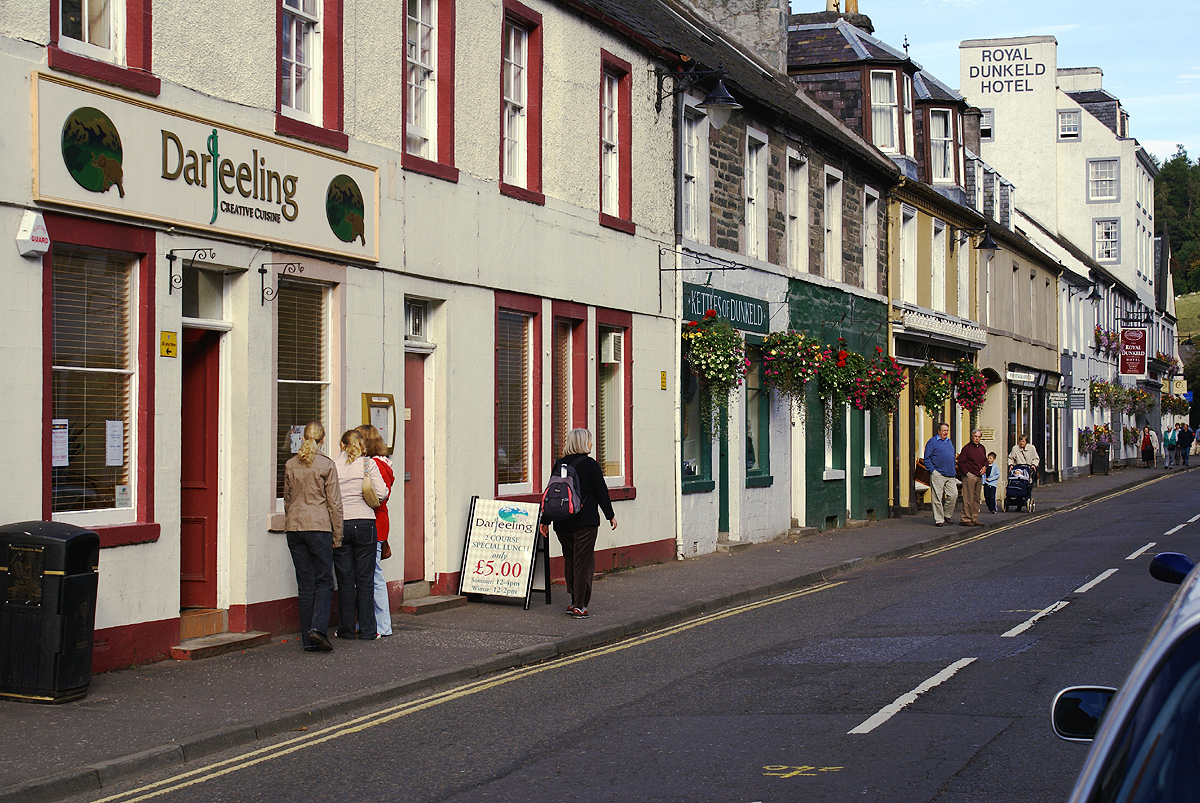
Dunkeld

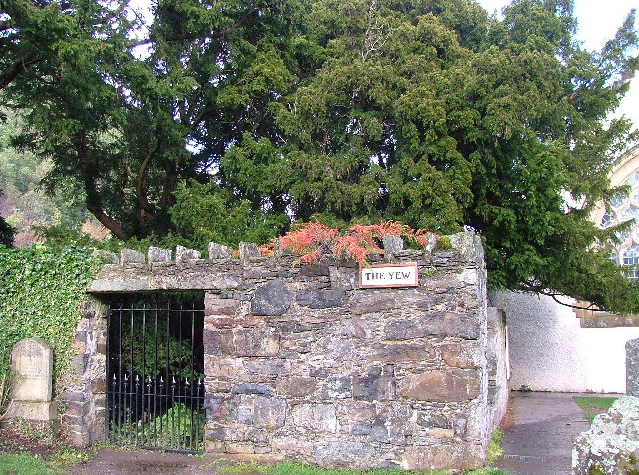
Fortingall Yew

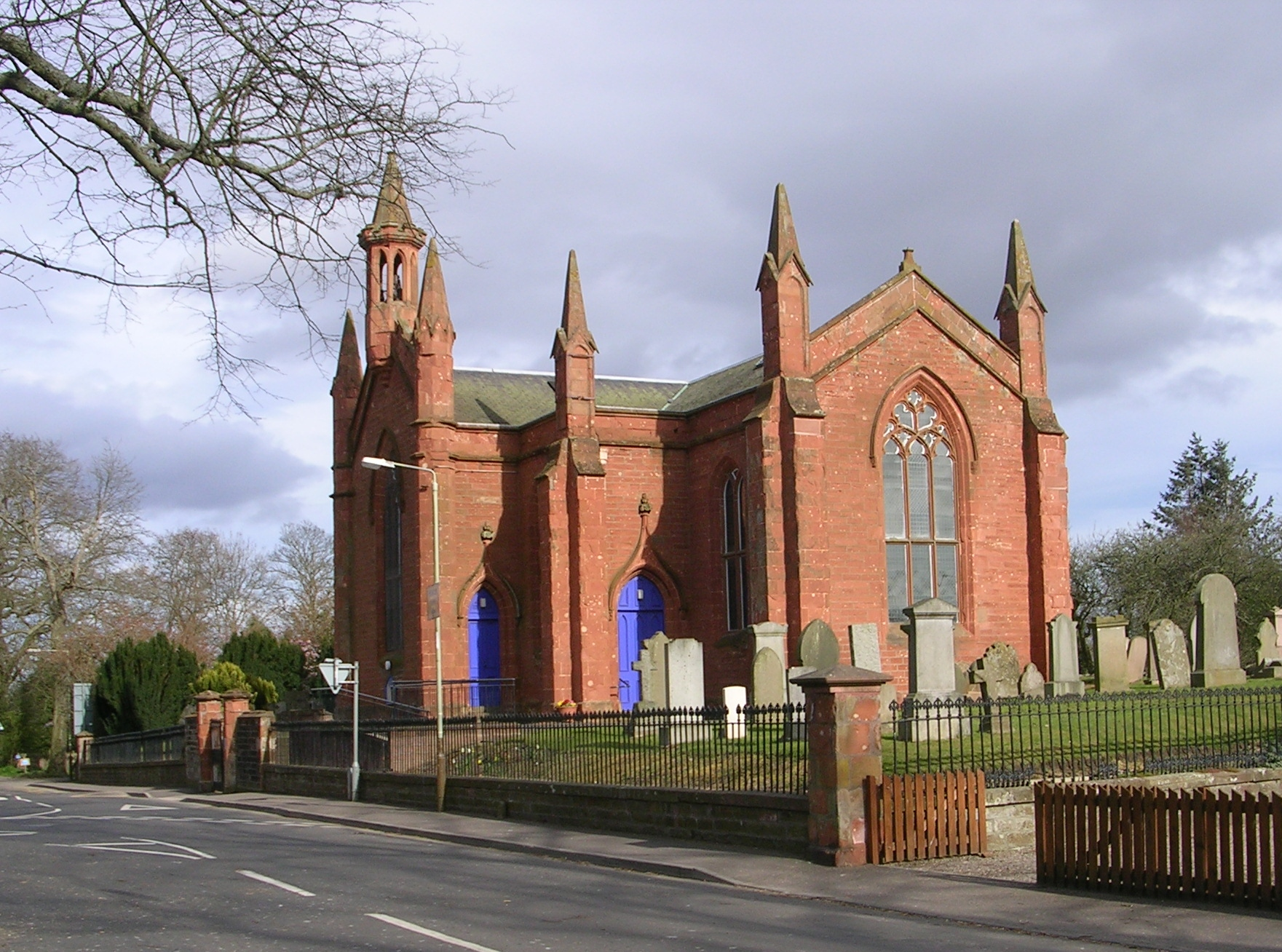
Inchture Church

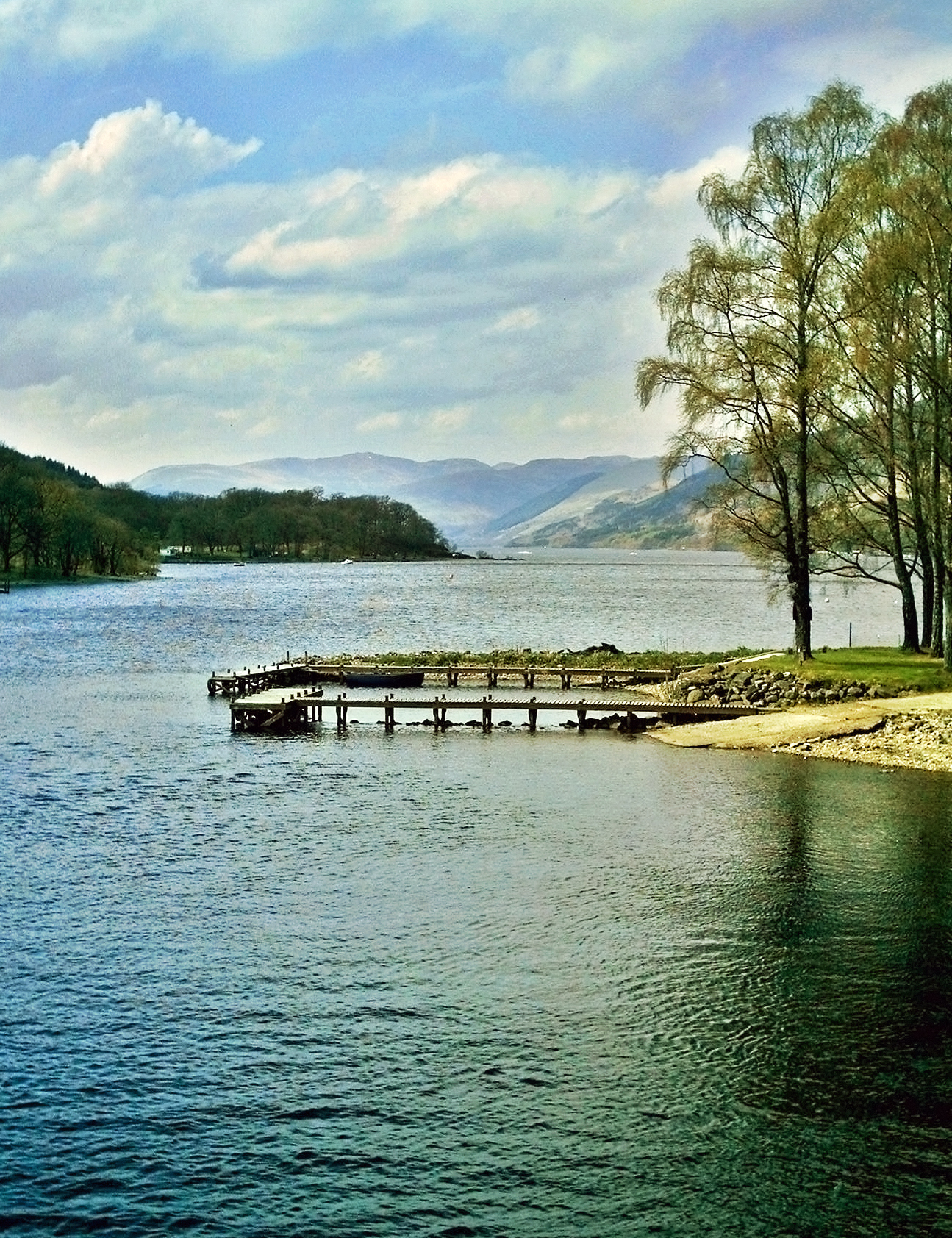
Loch Earn

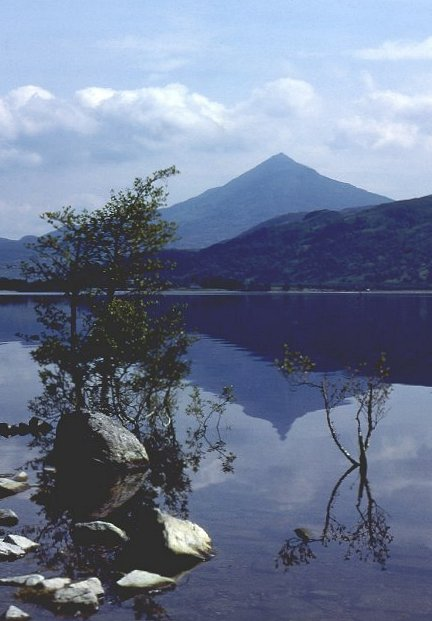
Loch Rannoch

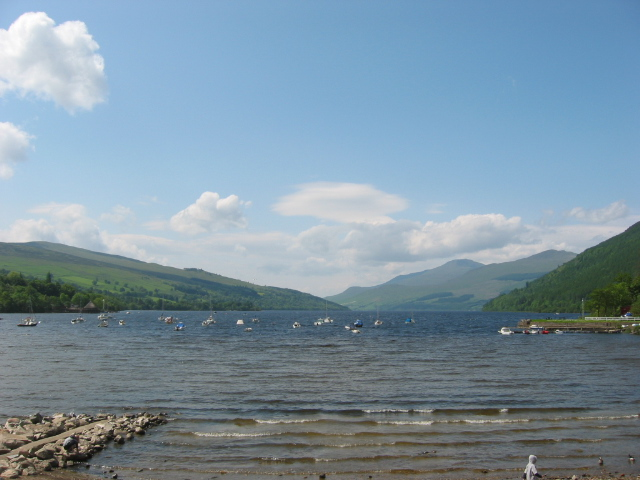
Loch Tay at Kenmore

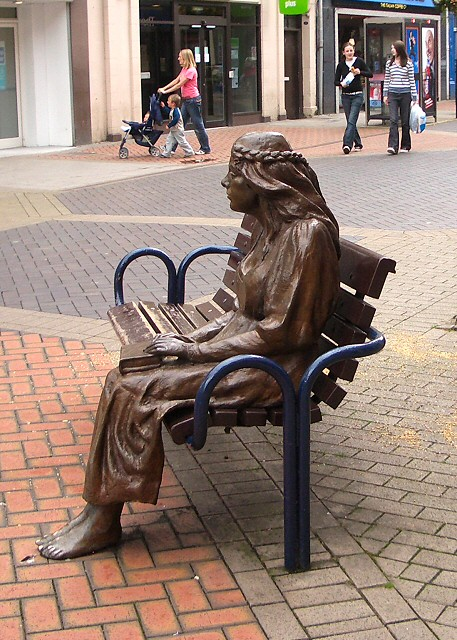
Fair Maid of Perth

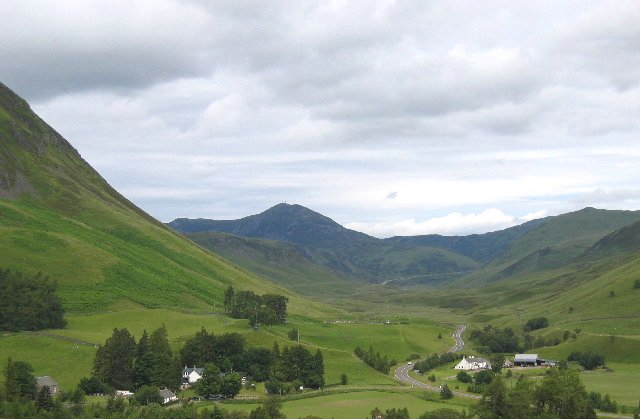
Glenshee from the Spittal

== A ==
- Abbots Deuglie
- Aberfeldy, Aberfeldy Distillery
- Abernethy
- Acharn
- Almondbank
- Alyth
- Amulree
- Atholl, Atholl Highlanders
- Auchterarder

== B ==
- Balado
- Ballinluig
- Bankfoot
- Ben Lawers
- Blackford
- Black Hill Roman Camps
- Blair Atholl, Blair Atholl Mill
- Blair Castle
- Blairgowrie
- Bridgend
- Bridge of Balgie
- Bridge of Earn
- Burrelton

== C ==
- Cairngorms National Park
- Castle Menzies
- Clunie
- Cluny House
- Comrie
- Coupar Angus
- Creag Odhar
- Crieff

== D ==
- Drummond Castle
- Dull
- Dunkeld
- Dunning

== E ==
- Errol

== F ==
- Fearnan
- Finegand
- Forgandenny
- Forest of Atholl
- Forteviot
- Fortingall, Fortingall Yew
- Fowlis Wester

== G ==
- Glen Lyon
- Glenfarg
- Glenshee, Glenshee Ski Centre
- Gowrie
- Grampian Mountains
- Grandtully
- Greenloaning

== I ==
- Inchture
- Innerpeffray
- Invergowrie

== K ==
- Keltybridge
- Kenmore
- Killiecrankie
- Kindrogan
- Kingoodie
- Kinloch Rannoch
- Kinross
- Kinrossie
- Kirkmichael

== L ==
- Lawers
- Leetown
- Loch Earn
- Loch Lomond and The Trossachs National Park
- Loch Rannoch
- Loch Tay
- Logierait
- Luncarty

== M ==
- Madderty
- McDiarmid Park
- Meigle
- Meikleour
- Melville Monument
- Methven
- Milnathort
- Muthill

== O ==
- Ochil Hills

== P ==
- Perth
- Pitkeathly Wells
- Pitlochry
- Pitmiddle

== R ==
- Rannoch Moor
- Rattray
- River Ericht
- River Isla
- River Tay

== S ==
- Scone
- Spittal of Glenshee
- St Fillans
- Stormontfield
- Strathearn
- Strathtay

== T ==
- Trinafour

== W ==
- Waterloo
- Weem

== See also ==
- List of places in Scotland
