= Loch Moraig =

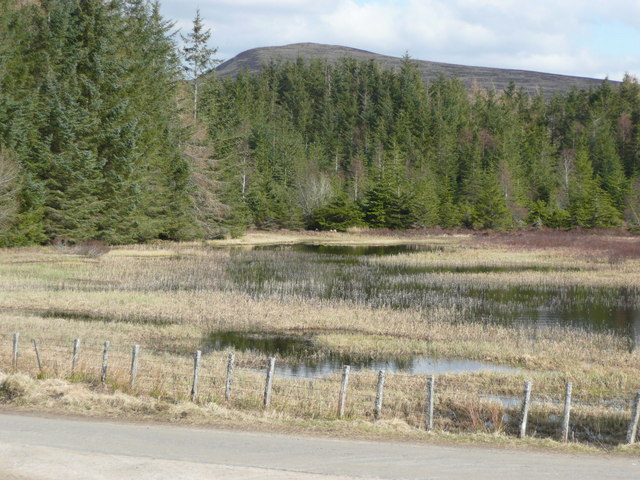
- Loch Moraig. This is a reed surrounded lochan linked to the larger loch and ideal for birds and fish. Meall Mor is just visible above the trees on the far side of the lochan.

- Location within Perth and Kinross
- Location: NN907666
- Coordinates: 56.7785°N 3.7899°W
- Type: freshwater loch
- Max. length: 0.804 km (0.500 mi)
- Max. width: 0.402 km (0.250 mi)
- Surface area: 12.6 ha (31 acres)
- Average depth: 5.5 ft (1.7 m)
- Max. depth: 14 ft (4.3 m)
- Water volume: 8,921,000 ft^{3} (252,600 m^{3})
- Shore length^{1}: 2.7 km (1.7 mi)
- Surface elevation: 334 m (1,096 ft)
- Max. temperature: 57.5 °F (14.2 °C)
- Min. temperature: 48 °F (9 °C)
- Islands: 2
- ^{1} Shore length is not a well-defined measure.

Loch Moraig is a freshwater loch, located 2 miles northeast of Blair Atholl. Loch Moraig was an artificial loch, originally a Snipe marsh, that was dammed in the south, to create the current loch.

== Hut circle ==
Slightly to the north of the loch is the remains of prehistoric hut circles. The two hut circles are formed by earth banks that have been reduced due to erosion. The west hut circle is 8.5m in diameter, and is a ring ditch house. The other hut is oval in shape and slightly larger at 9.0m in diameter. The two hut circles were examined by archaeological teams on 29 September 1967.

== Geography ==
Loch Moraig is dominated by the quadruple peaks of Beinn a' Ghlò, 2 miles on a north-west bearing. The peak called Carn Liath at 975m is the closest, with Braigh Coire Chruinn-bhalgain at 1070m directly behind it. To the south, at two and a half miles in the village of Killiecrankie, and three miles further on is the village of Pitlochry. Directly west of the loch is the small village of Old Blair. Ben Vuirich at 903 m is situated six and half miles in a north-easterly direction.

== Walking ==
Loch Moraig is both a popular walking destination and provides a number of tracks for walkers that lead from the loch to various locations within the Beinn a' Ghlò range and Ben Vuirich, leaving from the Bridge of Tilt, slightly north of Blair Atholl, and from the loch itself.
