= Càrn Liath (Munro) =

Mountain in Scotland

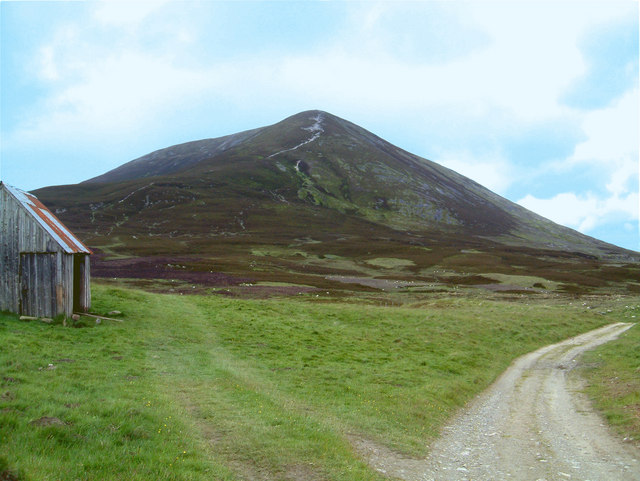
- Càrn Liath

Highest point
- Elevation: 976 m (3,202 ft)
- Prominence: 211 m (692 ft)
- Listing: Munro, Marilyn
- Coordinates: 56°48′28″N 3°44′39″W

Geography
- Location: Perth and Kinross, Scotland
- Parent range: Grampian Mountains
- OS grid: NN936698
- Topo map: OS Landranger 43

Carn Liath (976 m) is a mountain in the Grampian Mountains of Scotland. It lies east of Blair Atholl in Perthshire, Scotland.

Although belonging to the vast Beinn a' Ghlò massif, Càrn Liath is a mountain in its own right. It is prominent from the main A9 road to the west and is the most accessible of Beinn a' Ghlò's three Munros. Climbs usually start from the nearby Loch Moraig, and from there it can either be climbed on its own or as part of the long Beinn a' Ghló traverse. The peak also suffers from visible erosion on its slopes.
