= Bohespic =

Coordinates: 56.723°N 4.058°W

Bohespic (Gaelic: Both Easbaig 'bishop's house') is a place near Blair Atholl in the Perth and Kinross area of Scotland. The name also appears in older records in the forms Bohespick, Bohespike, Bospekke, Both an Easbean, etc. The land was once associated with Dunkeld Cathedral, and it has been suggested that the bishops may have used it as a summer retreat in medieval times. Historically, the community was made up of six named farm complexes or townships. Archeological records indicate that the site shows continuous habitation since ancient times. Two of the farms, Over Bohespic and Easter Bohespic are still occupied, and the remainder appear to have been occupied into the 19th century. The area now belongs to the Forestry Commission.
