= Lude House =

Category B listed house in Blair Atholl, Scotland

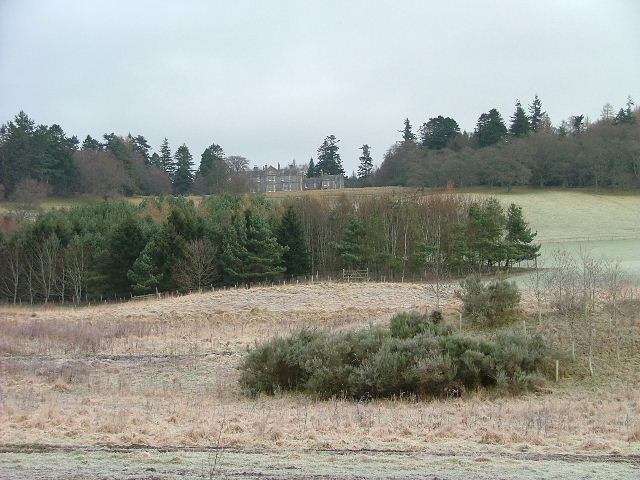
- The building viewed from the southwest, beside the B8079, in 2007
- Interactive map of the Lude House area
- Alternative names: House of Lude; Lude Estate

General information
- Location: Blair Atholl, Perth and Kinross, Scotland
- Coordinates: 56.775937867°N 3.831629481°W
- Construction started: 1837
- Completed: 1839 (187 years ago)

Technical details
- Floor count: 2

Design and construction
- Architect: William Burn

Lude House (also known as House of Lude or Lude Estate) is a Category B listed country house and estate in Blair Atholl, Perth and Kinross, Scotland. It was completed in 1839, and it received its historic designation in 1971. The building was designed by William Burn.

Today's building replaces an earlier structure, owned by the Robertson family, which was demolished in the early 19th century.

As of 2022, it is the seat of Andrew Grant, whose family has owned the estate since 1938. The McInroy family owned it in the 19th century.

The estate's six cottages are available for rental.

Lude Airfield (ICAO airport code GB-0329; also known as Blair Atholl Airfield), located around 0.8 miles (1.3 km) to the south, is owned by the estate.
