= Xander McDade =

Scottish politician

Councillor Xander McDade

Provost of Perth and Kinross Council
- Incumbent
- Assumed office 25 May 2022
- Preceded by: Dennis Melloy

Councillor of Perth and Kinross Council for Highland ward
- Incumbent
- Assumed office 4 May 2017

Personal details
- Born: 1993/1994 Aberdeen, Scotland
- Party: Independent

Xander McDade (born 1993/1994) is a Scottish Independent councillor for the Highland Ward of Perth and Kinross Council.

Xander McDade was first elected to Perth and Kinross Council in the 2017 Scottish council election with 449 1st preference votes, becoming a councillor at 23 years old.

In the 2022 election, he was re-elected with an increase in 1st preference votes of 74%.

Xander would become the youngest ever Provost of Perth and Kinross Council in 2022 at 28 years old and the youngest in Scotland since the end of World War II.

== Education ==
Xander was educated at Pitlochry High School in Pitlochry and then Breadalbane Academy in Aberfeldy. He would go on to attend UHI Perth and hold the post of Student Representative Council Chair there from 2012-13.

== Personal ==
Xander McDade is the son of Helen McDade who has been a Member of the Scottish Parliament for Mid Scotland and Fife since May 2026.

Xander's Grandpa was a town and county Councillor.

== Career ==
On 28 September 2018, Xander became the youngest person to chair a national park, being appointed Convener of the Cairngorms National Park Authority.

Throughout his time as a councillor, Xander has served on numerous committees, including the Learning & Families Committee. He is currently convener of two committees: the Civic Affairs Sub-Committee, which he joined on 18 June 2025, and Perth and Kinross Council, which he joined on 6 May 2022.

=== First term (2017–2022) ===
Xander would be heavily involved in the campaigns against rural school closures during the Perth & Kinross School Estate Review. One example of his involvement was in Logierait, where around 50 parents attended a meeting he organised. Xander stated that "Closure should not be one of the options under consideration".

One of the schools which he attended in his youth, Pitlochry High School, would also be put under review. Xander endorsed the idea of helping expand the school to include S5 and S6 and even created a draft financial plan aiming at helping deliver this.

=== Second term (2022–current) ===
Xander was elected Provost in May 2022 following a vote in which he received 20 votes from the Independent and SNP councillors, against the 14 votes cast for Conservative councillor Caroline Shiers by the Conservative and Liberal Democrat councillors, with Labour's two councillors abstaining.

== Awards & Acknowledgment ==
In 2018, Xander received a Spirit of Youth Award in recognition of his work with young people and local conservation groups in his community.
