= Blair Atholl Watermill =

- The logo of today's business, depicting the mill and its waterwheel

- Location within Perth and Kinross
- Current status: Tea room
- Coordinates: 56°45′53″N 3°50′50″W

Construction
- Completed: c. 1830; 196 years ago
- Renovated: 1977; 49 years ago

Equipment
- Mule Frames

Blair Atholl Watermill is Scotland's oldest working watermill, located in Blair Atholl, Perth and Kinross, and dating to around 1830. There has been a mill on the site since at least the 1590s. After it stopped being used, in 1929, it became a store. In 1977 it was restored by John Ridley and the last miller's assistant, who could still remember the previous mill. In 1993 it passed to James and Mary Bruce. Today, the building is used as a tea room, owned by the Bruces' children.

The mill's waterwheel is powered by the River Tilt, and can only be used when the river is in full spate.

== See also ==
- List of places in Perth and Kinross

== Gallery ==
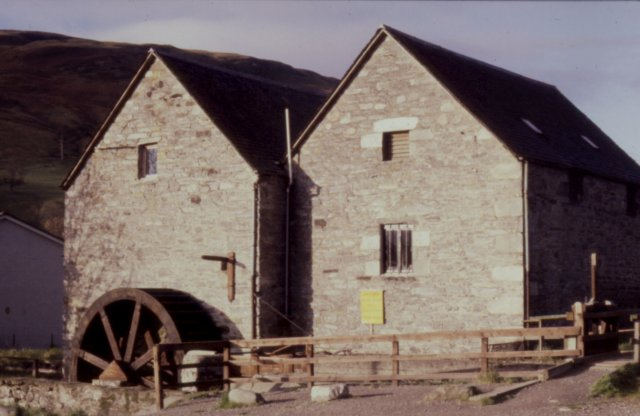
The mill building (left) and granary, 1980
