= Highland (ward) =

Electoral ward of Perth and Kinross, Scotland

Location of the ward

Highland is one of the twelve wards used to elect members of the Perth and Kinross Council. It elects three Councillors.

== Councillors ==
Election	Councillors		
2007	Eleanor Howie (SNP)	Ken Lyall (SNP)	Ian Campbell (Conservative)
2008 by-	Kaite Howie (SNP)	Ken Lyall (SNP)	Ian Campbell (Conservative)
2011 by-	Kaite Howie (SNP)	Mike Williamson (SNP)	Ian Campbell (Conservative)
2012	Kaite Howie (SNP)	Mike Williamson (SNP)	Ian Campbell (Conservative)
2017	Xander McDade (Ind.)	Mike Williamson (SNP)	Ian Campbell (Conservative)
2018 by-	Xander McDade (Ind.)	Mike Williamson (SNP)	John Duff (Conservative)
2022	Xander McDade (Ind.)	Mike Williamson (SNP)	John Duff (Conservative)

== Election results ==
=== 2022 Election ===
2022 Perth and Kinross Council election

Highland - 3 seats
Party	Candidate	FPv%	Count							
Party	Candidate	FPv%	1	2	3	4	5	6	7	8
Conservative	John Duff (incumbent)	24.92%	1,110	1,120						
Independent	Xander McDade (incumbent)	21.93%	977	1,009	1,010.1	1,076.15	1,148.16			
SNP	Michael Williamson (incumbent)	19.21%	856	857	857.16	865.16	908.16	914.89	930.38	1,740.42
SNP	Sally Murray	18.11%	807	811	811.15	829.16	899.17	905.09	916.98	
Conservative	Rhona Metcalf	6.02%	268	275	279	283.03	291.06	297.86		
Green	Mary McDougall	4.56%	203	212	212.1	247.11				
Labour	Paula Hunter	3.3%	147	166	166.18					
Liberal Democrats	Barry McMahon	1.95%	87							
Electorate: 7,674 Valid: 4,455 Quota: 1,114 Turnout: 58.8%

=== 2018 By-election ===
Highland By-election (19 April 2018) - 1 Seat
Party	Candidate	FPv%	Count					
Party	Candidate	FPv%	1	2	3	4	5	6
Conservative	John Duff	46.7	1,907	1,908	1,923	1,930	1,977	2,084
SNP	John Kellas	35.9	1,466	1,467	1,472	1,509	1,594	1,712
Independent	Avril Taylor	6.9	280	286	299	325	391	
Labour	Jayne Ramage	5.8	239	240	256	280		
Green	Mary McDougall	2.5	104	106	118			
Liberal Democrats	Chris Rennie	1.9	78	78				
Independent	Denise Baykal	0.3	12					
Electorate: 7,333 Valid: 4,086 Spoilt: 31 Quota: 2,044 Turnout: 56.2%

=== 2017 Election ===
2017 Perth and Kinross Council election

Highland - 3 seats
Party	Candidate	FPv%	Count				
Party	Candidate	FPv%	1	2	3	4	5
Conservative	Ian Campbell (incumbent)††	45.44	1,927				
SNP	Mike Williamson (incumbent)	19.22	815	843.76	877.11	911.6	1,578.94
SNP	Kirsty Gowans	17.31	734	757.82	791.27	822.21	
Independent	Xander McDade	10.59	449	716.39	770.28	953.5	1,024.24
Green	Mary McDougall	3.96	168	200.81			
Liberal Democrats	Kenneth Spittal	3.49	148	332.71	385.39		
Electorate: TBC Valid: 4,241 Spoilt: 65 Quota: 1,061 Turnout: 4,306 (58.4%)

=== 2012 Election ===
2012 Perth and Kinross Council election

Highland - 3 seats
Party	Candidate	FPv%	Count					
Party	Candidate	FPv%	1	2	3	4	5	6
SNP	Katie Howie (incumbent)	33.09%	1,141					
Conservative	Ian Campbell (incumbent)	23.93%	825	839	849	902		
SNP	Mike Williamson (incumbent)	15.28%	527	727	742	776	780	879
Independent	Xander McDade	9.08%	313	334	368	410	418	559
Independent	William Leszke	8.29%	286	292	310	370	378	
Liberal Democrats	Victor Clements	6.24%	215	227	250			
Labour	Lorna Ferguson	4.09%	141	147				
Electorate: - Valid: 3,448 Spoilt: 52 Quota: 863 Turnout: 3,500 (%)

=== 2011 By-election ===
Highland by-election, 19 September 2011
Party	Candidate	FPv%	Count
Party	Candidate	FPv%	1
SNP	Mike Williamson	54.43	1,449
Conservative	Graham Rees	22.39	596
Liberal Democrats	Victor Clements	12.06	321
Independent	William Leske	10.11	269
Independent	Chris Rennie	1.0	27
SNP hold		Swing	
Electorate: 7,183 Valid: 2,662 Spoilt: 23 Quota: 1,332 Turnout: 2,685 (37.38%)

=== 2008 By-election ===
Highland by-election, 22 February 2008
Party	Candidate	FPv%	Count
Party	Candidate	FPv%	1
SNP	Katie Howie	59.90	1,891
Conservative	Graham Rees	29.78	940
Liberal Democrats	Andrew Kenton	7.25	229
Labour	Anne Chatt	3.07	97
SNP hold		Swing	
Electorate: 7,282 Valid: 3,157 Spoilt: 21 Quota: 1,579 Turnout: 43.6%

=== 2007 Election ===
2007 Perth and Kinross Council election

Perth and Kinross council election, 2007: Highland
Party	Candidate	FPv%	Count
Party	Candidate	FPv%	1
SNP	Eleanor Howie	32.9	1,489
Conservative	Ian Campbell	25.6	1,158
SNP	Ken Lyall	25.4	1,150
Liberal Democrats	Danus Skene	13.5	609
Independent	Ron Rose	2.5	115
Electorate: 7,312 Valid: 4,531 Spoilt: 96 Quota: 1,131 Turnout: 63.14%
