= Ben Vuirich =

Mountain in Perth and Kinross, Scotland

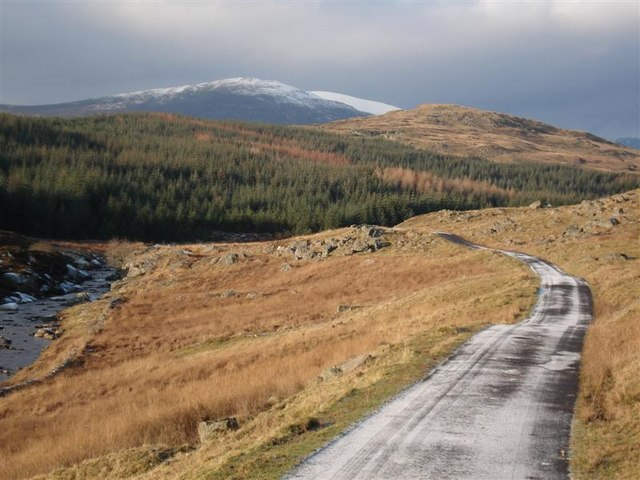
- Ben Vuirich (top) from the southeast

Highest point
- Elevation: 903 m (2,963 ft)
- Prominence: 345 m (1,132 ft)
- Listing: Corbett, Marilyn
- Coordinates: 56°48′39″N 3°38′39″W

Geography
- Location: Perth and Kinross, Scotland
- Parent range: Grampian Mountains
- OS grid: NN997700
- Topo map: OS Landranger 43

Ben Vuirich (903 m) is a mountain in the Grampian Mountains of Scotland. It is located in Perthshire, north of the town of Pitlochry. A mountain of heather and bog, it rises to the southeast of Beinn a' Ghlò.

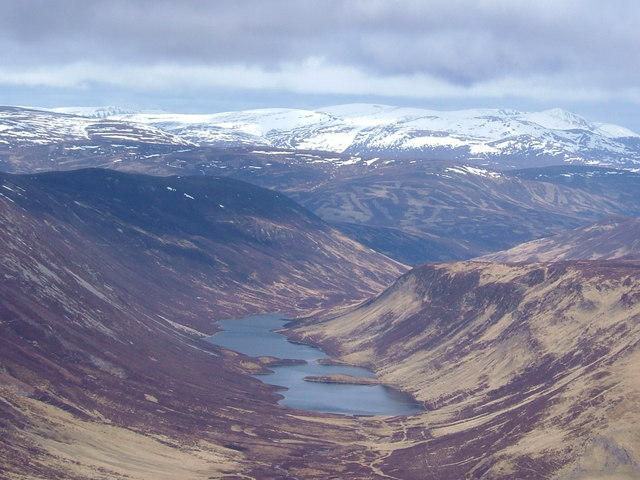
Photo of Loch Loch from the summit of Ben Vuirich
