= Waterloo, Perth and Kinross =

Coordinates: 56.513804°N 3.530770°W

Waterloo
- Location within Perth and Kinross
- OS grid reference: NO059368
- Council area: Perth and Kinross
- Lieutenancy area: Perth and Kinross
- Country: Scotland
- Sovereign state: United Kingdom
- Post town: PERTH
- Postcode district: PH1
- Dialling code: 01738
- Police: Scotland
- Fire: Scottish
- Ambulance: Scottish
- Scottish Parliament: North Tayside; North East Scotland

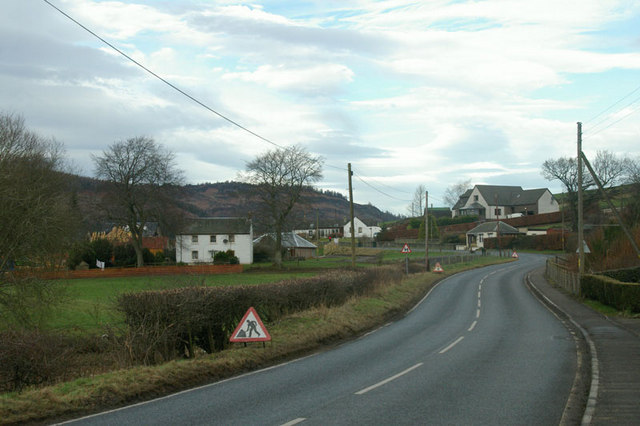
Waterloo

Waterloo is a small hamlet in Perth and Kinross, Scotland approximately 1/2 mile (800 metres) north of Bankfoot on the old A9.

== Etymology ==
Local opinion is divided on the origin of the name. Most agree that the hamlet was named after the Battle of Waterloo. However, some say it was named Waterloo because it was settled by soldiers returning from the battle, while others assert that it was given the name because the hamlet was built for the widows of the soldiers who did not return from the battle.

== Education ==
Waterloo is in the catchment area for Auchtergaven Primary School in nearby Bankfoot.

== Transport ==
Waterloo lies on the B867 (the old A9). It has one bus stop and is served by the Number 23 bus that runs between Perth and Aberfeldy and is operated By Stagecoach.

The nearest railway station is Dunkeld & Birnam approximately 3 miles (5 kilometres) north of Waterloo.

== Staredam Standing Stones ==
Just outside Waterloo there are two standing stones known as the Staredam standing stones. The stone on the right-hand side (if you are facing the stones from the road) has a cross carved in it and is suggested to be one of the earliest examples of Christian symbology being carved on pre-historic standing stones.

Steardam is also mentioned in Sir Walter Scott's book The Fair Maid of Perth.
