= Moncreiffe House =

House in Perth and Kinross, Scotland

Coordinates: 56.358°N 3.399°W

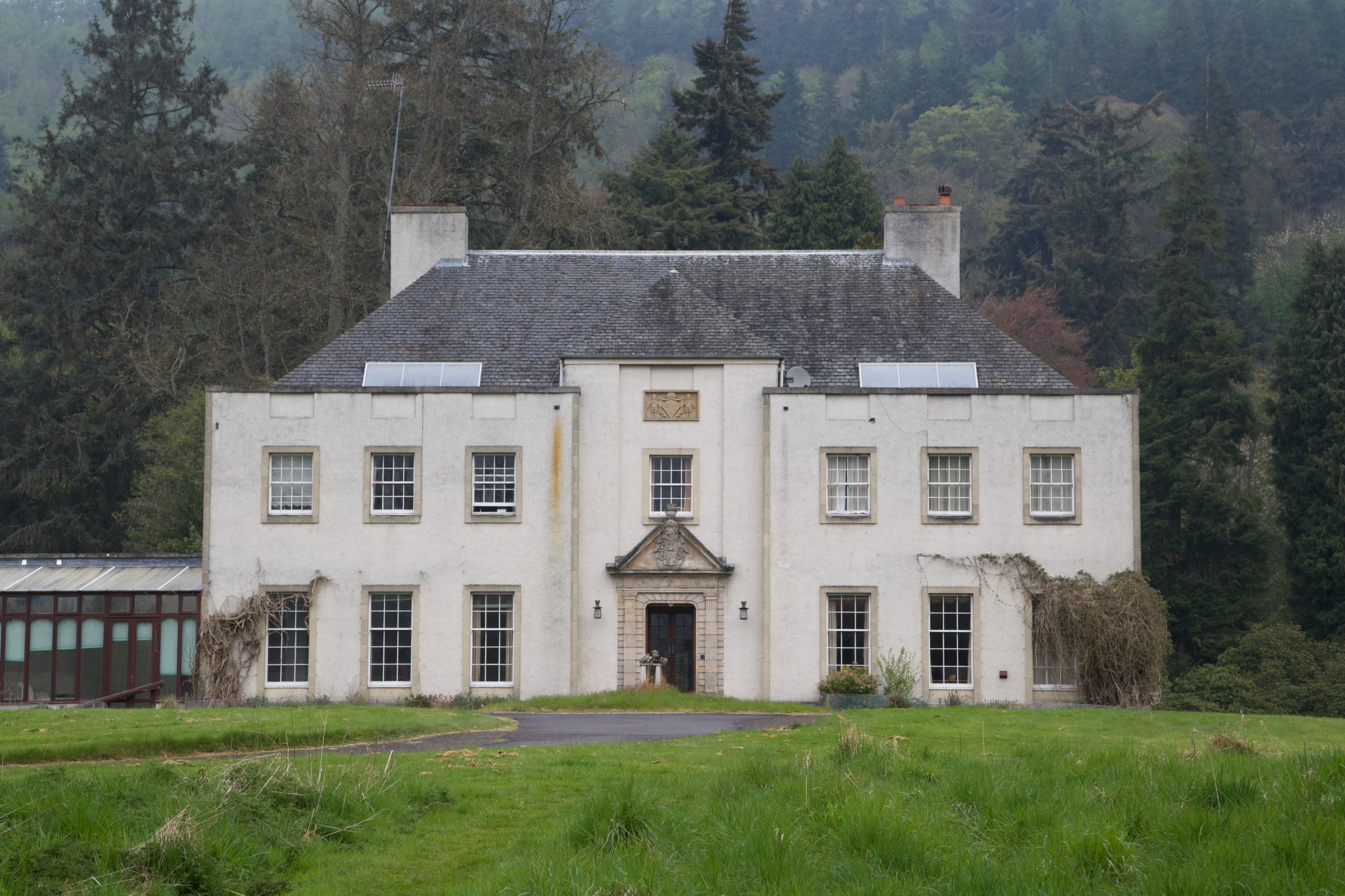
Moncreiffe House: the current building

Moncreiffe House is a country house near Bridge of Earn in Perthshire in Scotland. It is a category B listed building.

== History ==
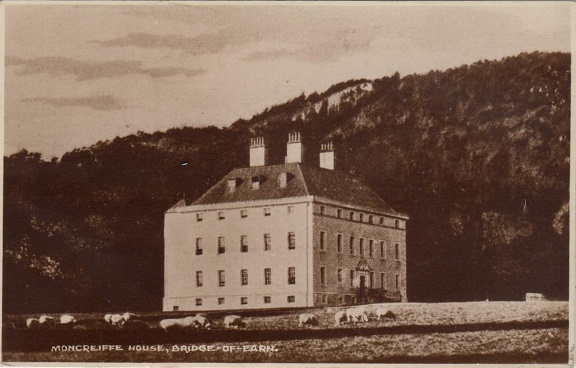
The 17th-century house

The house and its grounds lie below the southern slope of Moncreiffe Hill. The original house was designed by Sir William Bruce in the classical style for Sir Thomas Moncreiffe, 1st Baronet and was completed in 1679.

It was the headquarters of the Polish I Corps, which was formed under Scottish Command in September 1940, during the Second World War.

After the original house was completely destroyed by fire 1957, claiming the life of Sir David Moncreiffe of that Ilk, 10th Baronet and 23rd Laird, it was rebuilt to a design by Sir William Kininmonth in 1962. The doorpiece from the original house was used in the construction of the new building.

Part of the driveway leading to the house was built over in the 1980s during the construction of the M90 motorway.

An ancient stone circle stands in the grounds of the house.
