= Old Blair =

Coordinates: 56.77°N 03.86°W

Old Blair: Scottish Gaelic: Seann Bhlàr
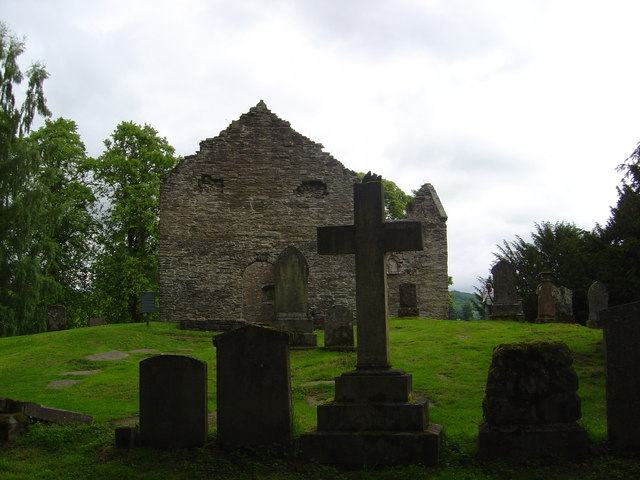
- Old Blair Kirk

- Location within Perth and Kinross
- OS grid reference: NN8666
- Council area: Perth and Kinross
- Country: Scotland
- Sovereign state: United Kingdom
- Police: Scotland
- Fire: Scottish
- Ambulance: Scottish

Old Blair is a tiny village of 18th century stone houses in Perth and Kinross, Scotland, adjoining and overlooking the grounds of Blair Castle. It is the site of St Bride's Kirk, the original church of Blair Atholl parish. This probably early Christian foundation was replaced by a new building in Blair Atholl village in the 19th century. There are substantial remains of the unroofed original church, set within an unwalled graveyard, though its western tower has been removed. The ancient building is flanked on the south side by a 'laird's aisle' of 16th century date, which encloses several monuments of the family of the Dukes of Atholl. John Graham of Claverhouse, 'Bonnie Dundee' (d 1689) is also buried in the vault below the aisle.

The modern burial ground of the ducal family lies within railings beside the mound on which the church is set.

The main medieval road north through the Central Highlands of Scotland formerly passed through Old Blair and on through Glen Banvie to the Minigaig Pass. It was in use up to the 18th century. The 'village street' of Old Blair was built on either side of it.
