= Bridge of Earn =

Coordinates: 56.350905°N 3.401250°W

Bridge of Earn: Scottish Gaelic: Drochaid Èireann
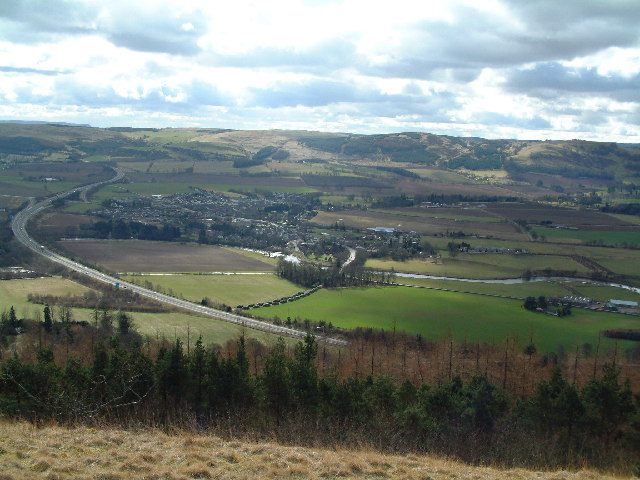

- Location within Perth and Kinross
- Population: 2,920 (2020)
- OS grid reference: NO1102
- Council area: Perth and Kinross
- Lieutenancy area: Perth and Kinross
- Country: Scotland
- Sovereign state: United Kingdom
- Post town: PERTH
- Postcode district: PH2
- Police: Scotland
- Fire: Scottish
- Ambulance: Scottish
- UK Parliament: Perth and Kinross-shire
- Scottish Parliament: Perthshire South and Kinross-shire

Bridge of Earn (Scottish Gaelic: Drochaid Èireann) is a village in Perth and Kinross, Scotland. Often referred to simply as 'Brig' (Scots for 'bridge'). The village grew up on the south bank of an important crossing of the River Earn, whose sandstone bridge existed from at least the early 14th century, when it is known to have been repaired by order of Robert I of Scotland (1306–1329) (site: NO 133 185). Substantial remains of the medieval bridge (rendered redundant by a replacement, still in use, slightly upstream in 1821–22) survived into the 1970s, when almost all the stonework was demolished. This ancient bridge was a major landmark on the road between Edinburgh (39 miles or 63 kilometres south) and Perth (4 miles or 6 kilometres north) for several centuries. The village's oldest houses are to be found lining the road (Back Street/Old Edinburgh Road) leading south from the site of the demolished bridge. Among them are some with 18th-century datestones.

The ruined Old Bridge of Earn (and part of the village) are featured in the 1857 painting Sir Isumbras at the Ford by John Everett Millais (1829–1896), who often stayed at nearby Perth. There is also an early 19th-century lithograph showing the structure as complete in Sketches of Scenery in Perthshire by David Octavius Hill (1802–1870).

== History ==
Bridge of Earn is the main village in the parish of Dunbarney (sometimes Dumbarney in older documents). The place-name is of uncertain (though probably Celtic) origin, and contains the element dun, 'fort', or possibly druim, 'ridge'. The ancient ecclesiastical focus of the parish was not within the present village, but about 1.5 km to the west at NO 113 190. The site of the medieval parish church is marked by a walled burial ground a little south of the River Earn. There are no visible remains of the medieval building (or of the medieval village that is said to have adjoined it to the south), but the churchyard contains an interesting collection of 18th-century headstones carved with symbols of mortality, trades etc. In 1689 the church was rebuilt much nearer to the Bridge, by then the main focus of settlement in the parish, at NO 130 185. In 1787 the church was rebuilt yet again, using the same stones, on its present site just to the east of the second, which also became a graveyard. The present congregation is a large and flourishing one, and a modern hall and kitchen has been built adjoining the church in recent years. The parish has recently been merged with Forgandenny, its neighbouring village 3 miles (5 kilometres) to the west.

The remains of two medieval chapels survive in Dunbarney parish, in the grounds of Moncrieffe Estate (originally a private chapel of the Moncrieffe family, now their burial vault), and at Ecclesiamagirdle (pronounced 'Exmagirdle'), a site of probably early Christian origin adjoining Ecclesiamagirdle House (early 17th century) on the Glenearn Estate below the Ochil Hills. It is sometimes suggested that the latter was a parish church in its own right up to the Reformation (1559), though there seems to be no conclusive documentation on this point. The small surviving late medieval building (roofless but largely complete) might seem too modest in size to have served as a parish church. The surrounding graveyard contains several well-preserved gravestones from the 17th and 18th centuries, which are interesting examples of 'folk art'.

The parish of Dunbarney was very much part of the traditional agricultural economy of lowland Scotland up to the late 19th century, with most of the inhabitants engaged in agriculture or associated rural crafts. The traffic on the main north road from Edinburgh also gave a certain scope for the inn and hotel trade to accommodate travellers. From the late 18th century the spa (now closed) at Pitkeathly Wells became an important economic focus, with large numbers of visitors resorting to the parish to 'take the waters'. During the 19th century the coming of the railway to the village and the building of a station (closed in the 1960s) provided a further source of local employment, with much local produce being moved out by rail.

Bridge of Earn has had two railway stations, the second and most recent having closed on 15 June 1964. Bridge of Earn's original station had been located a few hundred yards further east when the existing line first opened on 18 July 1848. This station was closed on 1 February 1892, not as a consequence of economic cutbacks, but rather as a consequence of expansion. The Bridge of Earn to Mawcarse line, which followed closely to the route of the current M90 motorway southwards towards Balmanno Hill, before cutting right through the heart of it via the two tunnels which still exist today, opened to passengers on 1 June 1890. It made logistical sense to move Bridge of Earn's station to a better position to accommodate this new junction and so the original station was replaced. This section of line, between Bridge of Earn and Cowdenbeath, was closed in January 1970, following the Labour government instructions and was not a Beeching recommendation.

Salmon fishing on the Earn (a major tributary of the Tay), was also long an important source of income, though since the late 20th century commercial net fishing on both rivers has died out (sport fishing continues in season).

Since the Second World War, Bridge of Earn has increasingly become a dormitory town for families whose wage-earners commute to Perth, Dundee, Edinburgh or other large towns, and this has led to a great expansion in the numbers of homes being built, and a corresponding increase in the number of local shops and services.

== Expansion ==
Bridge of Earn and the formerly neighbouring but now conjoined village of Kintillo have expanded out of all recognition since the 1960s, with hundreds of new homes being built. An entire new settlement called Oudenarde—named for the Flemish town of Oudenaarde—is currently being built on the site of the large former hospital (NO 142 181) to the east of the old village. The Great Recession caused a temporary halt in construction, though the project later resumed, with the approach roads under construction as of June 2015 (again underway as of January 2025; many homes are now complete).

Bridge of Earn's proximity to Perth, and convenient transport links to Edinburgh and Dundee, make it a desirable 'dormitory' town, though its second and most-recent railway station was closed on 15 June 1964, following the Beeching reforms of the 1960s.

== Sport ==
The local amateur football team Bridge of Earn AFC play their home fixtures at Victory Park.

The local Bridge of Earn Bowling Club on Main Street is one of the oldest (founded in 1859 on land leased to the village by Sir Thomas Moncreiffe) and largest sports clubs in the village.

== Facilities ==
Apart from the parish church and the primary school, the facilities in the village include three parks: Victory, Balmanno and Kintillo.

The spa at the neighbouring hamlet (1 mile or 1.5 kilometres west) of Pitkeathly Wells was formerly well-known and popular as a health and social resort, but was closed in 1949.

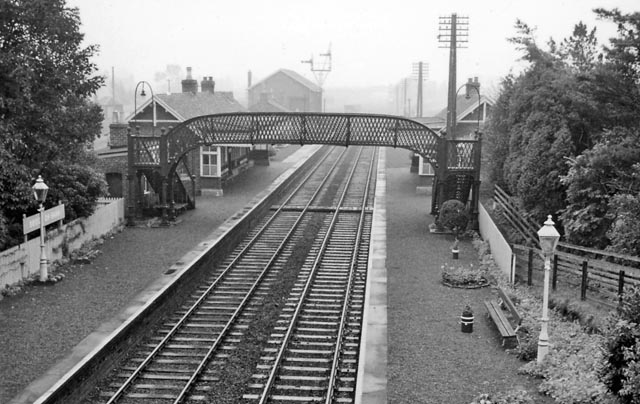
Until 1964, Bridge of Earn had a railway station opened by the North British Railway

== Education ==
The village school is Dunbarney Primary School (run by Perth and Kinross Council), which was extended and modernised in 1996.

Dunbarney Primary School is a feeder school for Secondary Bertha Park High School in the north of Perth, Scotland.

Up until August 2024, on the south west outskirts of the village, there was Kilgraston School, which is centred upon a mansion house built around 1800 by Francis Grant of Glenlochy.

== Estates ==
Local estates that surround the village (none of whose houses are open to the public) include Moncreiffe House (the seat of the ancient family of Moncrieffe), Glenearn House (with the early-17th-century Ecclesiamagirdle House in its grounds) and Dunbarney House.

== Hospital ==
Bridge of Earn Hospital was established as an Emergency Hospital Service facility in 1939. It closed in 1992.

== See also ==
- List of places in Perth and Kinross
