= Pitkeathly Wells =

Coordinates: 56.3442°N 3.4333°W

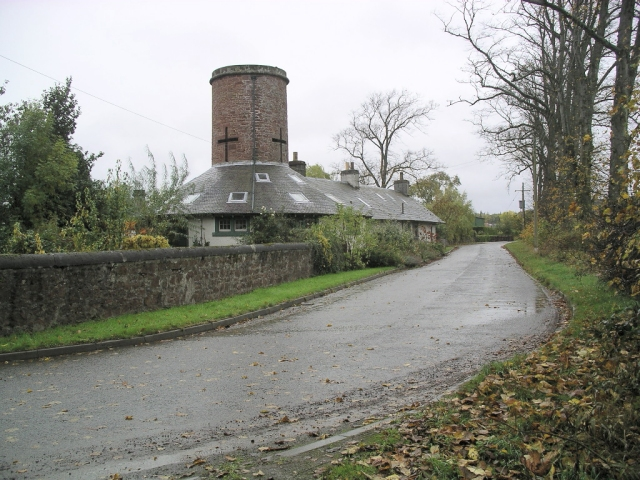
- Pitkeathly Wells

- Location within Perth and Kinross
- OS grid reference: NO115178
  - Edinburgh: 40 mi (64 km) S
  - London: 440 mi (710 km) SSE
- Council area: Perth and Kinross
- Lieutenancy area: Perth and Kinross
- Country: Scotland
- Sovereign state: United Kingdom
- Post town: Perth
- Postcode district: PH2
- Dialling code: 01738
- Police: Scotland
- Fire: Scottish
- Ambulance: Scottish
- UK Parliament: Perth and Kinross-shire
- Scottish Parliament: Perthshire South and Kinross-shire

Pitkeathly Wells (spelling variants: Pitcaithly, Pitceathly, Pitkethley, etc.) is a hamlet in the Perth and Kinross area of Scotland, famed for its mineral water. The water was recommended for health during the 19th century, and was bottled for sale, sometimes carbonated. In 1910, Schweppes took over bottling the water, however, they shut down production after a fire.

== Hamlet ==
Pitkeathly, historically known as Pitcaithly, is situated north of the Ochil Hills, 2 miles (3 kilometres) southwest of Bridge of Earn. Pitcaithly Bannock, a kind of bannock quite similar to a shortbread, is named for the town.

== Mineral water ==
The hamlet has five main wells which produce Pitkeathly mineral water, which were known in the 19th century as the East, the West, the Spout, the Dunbarny, and the Southpark. The wells had been used for restorative properties by the local community, but in 1772 the scientific community started investigating them. A scholar from Glasgow discovered that the water contained quantities of calcium, salt, magnesium and limestone. There are records of people bathing in the springs going back to 1711. By 1876, the water was bottled and sent round the country, sometimes carbonated. In addition, the owner of the land, Mr Grant of Kilgraston, had opened a mineral spa at the springs, with accommodation for guests.

Schweppes took over the springs in 1910 and subsequently bottled the water in a plant employing thirty people. In 1927, a disastrous fire ended the bottling operation. The mineral spa was closed in 1949.
