= Abbots Deuglie =

Coordinates: 56.2823°N 3.4237°W

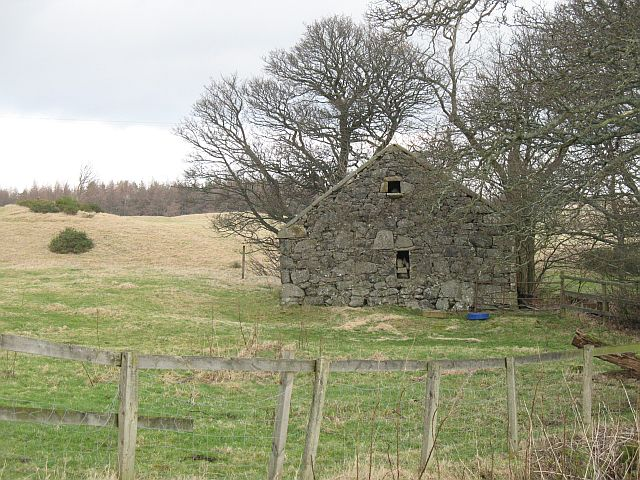
- Stone byre, Abbots Deuglie

- Location within Perth and Kinross
- Council area: Perth and Kinross
- Country: Scotland
- Sovereign state: United Kingdom
- Post town: Perth
- Postcode district: PH2
- Police: Scotland
- Fire: Scottish
- Ambulance: Scottish
- UK Parliament: Perth and Kinross-shire <-- 2024 -->

Abbots Deuglie (/ˌæbəts ˈdjuːɡli/) is a hamlet in Perth and Kinross, Scotland. It is located in the Ochil Hills, in Arngask parish, about one mile (1.5 km) west of Glenfarg. Glenfarg Reservoir lies just to the west of the village, and was built in 1912.

The site is noted for two Neolithic sites, Abbots Deuglie stone circle, which is now virtually unrecognisable as an archaeological site due to the removal of the stones from it, and a single standing stone at West Blair, 700 metres (2,300 feet) south of the village.
