= Perth and Kinross Spirit of Youth Awards =

The Perth and Kinross Spirit of Youth Awards (SoY) are an annual awards ceremony for young people held in the area of Perth and Kinross, Scotland. They aim to recognise the achievements of young people in the area in sport, the arts, the environment and the local community. They are currently held in the Perth Concert Hall in Perth. They are run on behalf of the Perth and Kinross Council Sub-Group for Children and Young People by the Perth and Kinross Youth Council.

== History ==
The Spirit of Youth Awards were established by Perth and Kinross Council in 2007 to recognise the contributions which local young people made to their communities. The 2008 awards were held in the Salutation Hotel in Perth, before the ceremony moved to the Perth Concert Hall. Dartington Crystal became a principal sponsor of the awards in 2009, and have since provided the ceremony with its trophies. From 2010, the main Spirit of Youth Awards were twinned with the presentation of Gold Duke of Edinburgh Awards for the region.

== Partners and Sponsors ==
Principal Partner since 2009 - Dartington Crystal 2010 Partner - YMCA 2011 Partner - St John's Academy

Sponsors for the awards include the Perthshire Advertiser, Live Active Leisure and the Perth and Kinross Heritage Trust.

== Categories ==
The Spirit of Youth Awards are divided into individual and group awards.

The individual awards are:

- Personal Achievement
- Special Endeavor
- Community Contribution

The group awards include:

- Group Achievement Award
- Group Award for Contribution to the Arts
- Group Award for Contribution to the Environment
- Group Active Citizenship Award
- Group Award for Endeavor in Sporting

There is also an overall award each year. The winner of the Overall Perth and Kinross Spirit of Youth Award in 2009 was Kimberly Tosh.
