= Beinn a' Ghlò =

Scottish mountain in the Forest of Atholl

Beinn a’ Ghlò
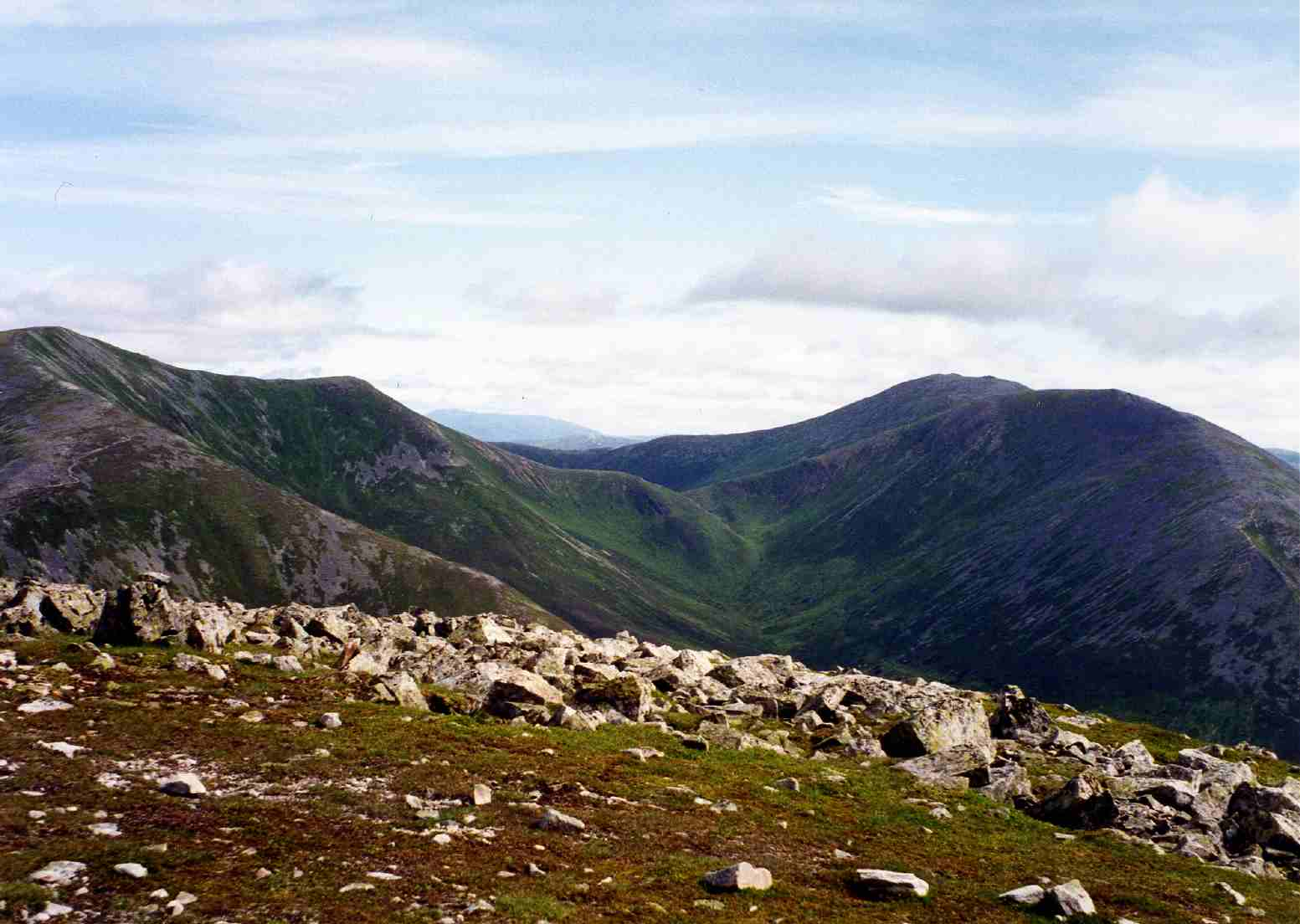
- Bràigh Coire Chruinn-bhalgain (left) and Càrn nan Gabhar (right) seen from Càrn Liath

Highest point
- Elevation: 1,121.9 m (3,681 ft)
- Prominence: 658 m (2,159 ft)
- Parent peak: Lochnagar
- Listing: Munro, Marilyn
- Coordinates: 56°49′52″N 3°43′48.9″W

Naming
- English translation: Hill of the Veil or Mist
- Language of name: Gaelic
- Pronunciation: Scottish Gaelic: [peɲəˈɣl̪ˠɔː] English approximation: BAYN-ə-KHLAW

Geography
- Location within Scotland
- Location: Perthshire, Scotland
- Parent range: Grampians
- OS grid: NN970732
- Topo map: OS Landranger 43, OS Explorer 394

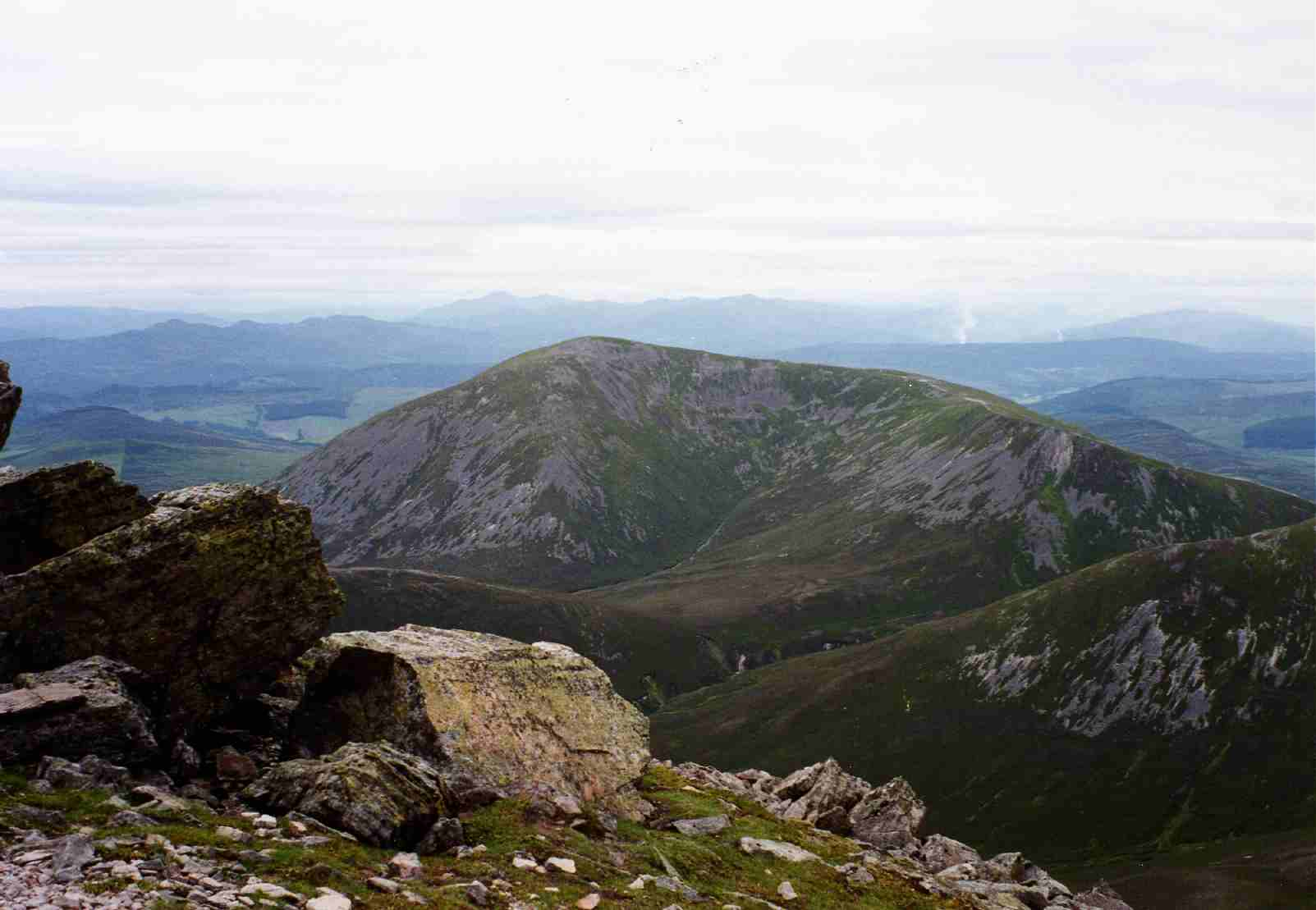
Càrn Liath from Airgiod Bheinn

Beinn a’ Ghlò is a Scottish mountain situated roughly ten kilometres (six miles) northeast of Blair Atholl in the Forest of Atholl in between Glen Tilt and Glen Loch, in Cairngorms National Park.

== Details ==
It is a huge, complex hill with many ridges, summits and corries, covering approximately 40 km^{2} (15 sq mi) with three Munros. These are Càrn Liath (Grey Cairn) at 976 metres (3,202 ft), Bràigh Coire Chruinn-bhalgain ("Brae/Brow of the Corrie of Round Blisters", "blisters" referring to rock formations) at 1,070 metres (3,510 ft) and Càrn nan Gabhar ("Hill/cairn of the Goats") at 1,121.9 metres (3,681 ft). The mountain has patches of grey scree (see pictures) amongst grass, while heather grows quite profusely on the lower slopes and gives the hill a colourful skirt when in bloom in summer.

=== Flora and fauna ===
Beinn a' Ghlò has such a diversity of flora that it has been declared a SSSI and a SAC over an area of 80 km^{2} (31 sq mi). It is a region of European dry heaths and there are many species of alpine and marsh plants on the mountain such as the rare yellow oxytropis (Oxytropis campestris), mountain avens (Dryas octopetala), rock speedwell (Veronica fruticans), rock sedge (Carex rupestris) and green spleenwort (Asplenium viride).

=== Human activity ===
Beinn a' Ghlò is a familiar sight to motorists travelling north along the A9 road at the Pass of Killiecrankie but this view only shows Càrn Liath. The main mass of the mountain is hidden behind with the highest and most distant Munro, Càrn nan Gabhar, more than 12 km (7 1/2 mi) from Blair Atholl, so it is a full day's expedition to climb all three Munros. Beinn a' Ghlò has nineteen corries and legend says that a rifle shot in any one cannot be heard in any of the others. Queen Victoria viewed the mountain in 1844 on a drive up Glen Tilt, saying, "We came upon a lovely view — Beinn a' Ghlò straight before us — and under these high hills the River Tilt gushing and winding over stones and slates … and the air so pure and fine but no description can do it justice".

There are two popular starting points for the traverse of the mountain. The first is at Loch Moraig (grid reference NN905670) at the end of the minor road, 3 km (2 mi) from Blair Atholl. The other is at Marble Lodge in Glen Tilt (grid reference NN898717) but this requires permission from the Atholl Estate to drive the 7 km (4 1/2 mi) up the private estate road. From Loch Moraig a track is followed to the foot of the mountain. It is a steep climb to the first Munro of Càrn Liath passing through white granite scree near the top. The route continues north dropping down to a col at 760 metres (2,490 ft) to climb Bràigh Coire Chruinn-bhalgain which gives a fine view down into Glen Tilt before turning east to take in Càrn nan Gabhar. The return to Loch Moraig can be varied, going over the "top" of Airgiod Bheinn (1,061 m or 3,481 ft), which translates as Silver Mountain, before dropping into the valley and picking up the track; this avoids the need to re-ascend the first two Munros.

In May 1993, an RAF Hercules plane stalled and crashed on the mountain while engaged in low level navigation training, killing all nine on board.

=== Views ===
Càrn Liath and Càrn nan Gabhar both have trig points and are excellent viewpoints. Càrn nan Gabhar’s highest point is not actually at the trig point; it is at a cairn 200 metres (660 ft) to the north east with a height of 1,121.9 metres (3,681 ft), about 2 metres (7 ft) more than the trig point. Càrn nan Gabhar has a panorama that includes the Cairngorms, the Glen Shee hills and an aerial view down into Glen Loch. Càrn Liath looks out over Blair Atholl towards the Scottish Lowlands.

== Gaelic pronunciation ==
- Càrn Liath [kʰaːrˠn ʎiə]
- Bràigh Coire Chruinn-bhalgain (Gaelic: Bràigh Coire a' Chruinn-bhalgain) [pɾaːjkʰɔɾʲəˈxɾɯiɲvalˠ̪akɛɲ]
- Càrn nan Gabhar [kʰaːrˠnəŋˈko.əɾ]
- Airgiod Bheinn (Gaelic: Airgead-bheinn) [ˈɛɾʲɛkʲət̪veɲ]

== See also ==
- Ben Nevis
- List of Munro mountains
- Mountains and hills of Scotland
