= Forest of Atholl =

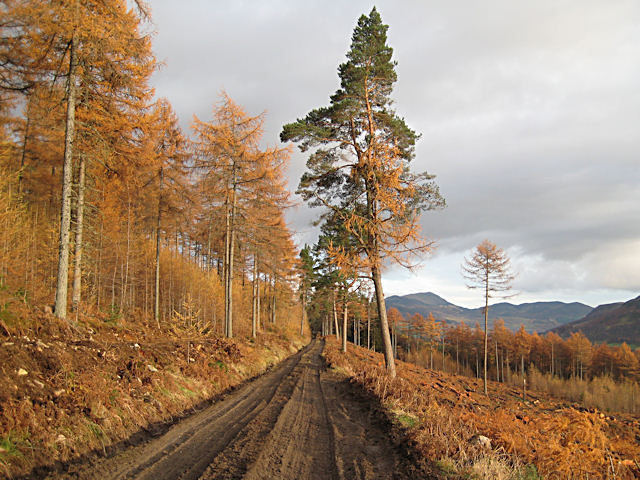
- A logging road in Baluain Wood, looking east

- Location within Perth and Kinross Location within Scotland
- Interactive map of Forest of Atholl

Geography
- Location: Perth and Kinross, Scotland
- Coordinates: 56.841644°N 3.9238399°W

The Forest of Atholl (also known as Atholl Forest) is a deer forest near the Scottish village of Blair Atholl, Perth and Kinross, first recorded in the 12th century. 100,000 acres (40,000 ha) in size, most of it is within the Cairngorms National Park.
