= Cluny House =

Category B listed house in Aberfeldy, Perth and Kinross

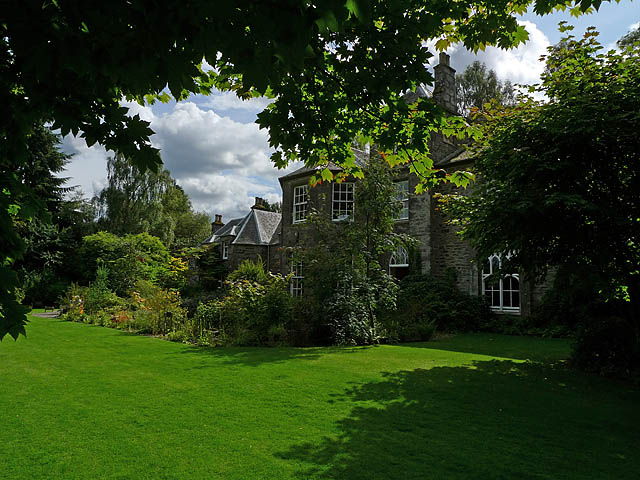
- Cluny House in 2009
- Interactive map of the Cluny House area

General information
- Location: Aberfeldy, Perth and Kinross, Scotland
- Coordinates: 56.6411°N 3.82875°W
- Completed: c. 1825; 201 years ago

Inventory of Gardens and Designed Landscapes in Scotland
- Official name: Cluny House
- Designated: 30 June 1987
- Reference no.: GDL00104

Technical details
- Floor count: 2 (3 in tower)

Cluny House is Category B listed building in Aberfeldy, Perth and Kinross, Scotland. It dates to around 1825. Its tower was added about fifty years later.

In the mid-19th century, it was the home of Thomas Cockburn-Hood (1820–1889).

The house's gardens were started in the 1950s by Bobby and Betty Masterton. The former also planted the tree trail at the Birks of Aberfeldy.

== See also ==
- List of listed buildings in Perth and Kinross
