= Blair Atholl =

Village in Perthshire, Scotland

Coordinates: 56.77°N 3.84°W

Blair Atholl: Scottish Gaelic: Blàr Athall
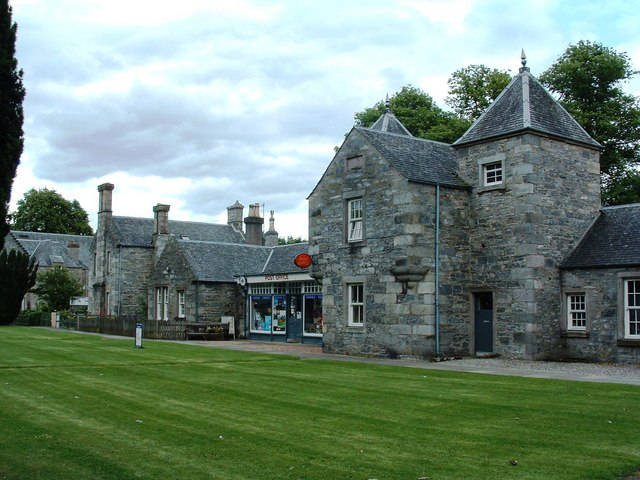
- Blair Atholl Post Office

- Location within Perth and Kinross
- Population: 600 - 700
- OS grid reference: NN876654
  - Edinburgh: 61.5 mi (99 km)
  - London: 393 mi (632 km)
- Community council: Blair Atholl and Struan
- Council area: Perth and Kinross
- Lieutenancy area: Perth and Kinross
- Country: Scotland
- Sovereign state: United Kingdom
- Post town: PITLOCHRY
- Postcode district: PH18
- Police: Scotland
- Fire: Scottish
- Ambulance: Scottish
- UK Parliament: Angus and Perthshire Glens
- Scottish Parliament: Perthshire North

Blair Atholl (from the Scottish Gaelic: Blàr Athall, originally Blàr Ath Fhodla) is a village in Perthshire, Scotland, built about the confluence of the Rivers Tilt and Garry in one of the few areas of flat land in the midst of the Grampian Mountains. The Gaelic place-name Blair, from blàr, 'field, plain', refers to this location. Atholl, which means 'new Ireland', from the archaic Ath Fhodla is the name of the surrounding district.

On 13 March 2008, it was announced that Blair Atholl (together with some other Highland Perthshire villages) would be included in the Cairngorms National Park. This change was made at the request of the people of the town. The Forest of Atholl already formed part of the Cairngorms.

== Blair Castle ==
Blair Atholl's most famous feature is Blair Castle (NN 865 662), one of Scotland's premier stately homes, and the last castle in the British Isles to be besieged, in 1746 during the last Jacobite rising. The Castle was the traditional home of the Earls (later Marquesses, now Dukes) of Atholl. The Duke of Atholl is the only person in the United Kingdom allowed to raise a private army. This army, known as the Atholl Highlanders, conducts largely social and ceremonial activities, and primarily consists of workers on the extensive Atholl Estates.

The Castle no longer belongs directly to the Duke of Atholl, as the 10th Duke, George Iain Murray (1931–96), left the Castle in trust upon his death. His distant cousin the 11th Duke, John Murray (1929–2012), lived in South Africa, and visited annually to review the Atholl Highlanders. The oldest part of Blair Castle, known as Comyn's (or Cumming's) Tower, a small tower-house with immensely thick walls, is claimed (perhaps dubiously) to date from as early as the 13th century. The majority of the Castle is 16th century in date, though much altered. After the siege referred to above, the upper storey and battlements of the ancient Castle were removed to render it indefensible. A medieval appearance becoming fashionable again during the 19th century, the Castle, which had become known as Atholl House, was raised in height and adorned with battlements once more. The many alterations in the fabric are largely concealed by the white harling (roughcast) on the walls. The collections of furniture, paintings, historical relics, weapons, embroidery, china, Highland artefacts and hunting trophies preserved in the Castle are among the finest in Scotland, as is the plasterwork and other décor of the principal rooms. Thirty-two rooms are open to the public, more than in any comparable stately home.

The Castle sits in extensive grounds, which the Dukes of Atholl have altered and added to over several centuries. Notable among the features are Diana's Grove and the Hercules Garden, both laid out in the first half of the 18th century, and rare examples of their period. Both are adorned with lead reproductions of Classical statues. The Dukes of Atholl were early and enthusiastic tree planters, and Diana's Grove contains some of the tallest trees in Great Britain. The Hercules Garden, recently restored, is a rare survival of a walled formal garden with an artificial lake and islands, surrounded by plantations of fruit trees. There are several other follies, bridges etc. of various periods.

Also within the Castle grounds is the hamlet and former parish church of Old Blair (NN 867 666), the original focus of settlement in the area before the present village, which was laid out from the first half of the 19th century. The church was dedicated to St Bride and is a probable early Christian site. John Graham of Claverhouse, Viscount Dundee, 'Bonnie Dundee' was buried in the aisle attached to the now roofless church after the Battle of Killiecrankie, 27 July 1689. The modern railed burial enclosure of the family of the Dukes adjoins the ancient unenclosed churchyard. In the Middle Ages the main road from Atholl to Badenoch, and hence to the north of Scotland, passed through this village and the Minigaig Pass.

In 1946 the first Blair Atholl International Scout Jamborette was held within the castle grounds. This Scout Camp has been held every two years since, with Scouts from across the globe in attendance. The camp was the idea of Jack Stewart, International Commissioner for Scotland before and after the 1939/1945 war, who proposed a smaller international camp than a World Jamboree – a Jamborette. John Kennedy, the Camp Chief from 1998 to 2010, passed over the role to Andrew Sharkey for the camp in 2012.

Built in 1820 as a private hunting lodge by John Murray, 4th Duke of Atholl, the Atholl Arms Hotel and its estate was owned for most of the 20th century by the Stewart~MacKay family (the second-largest employers in Highland Perthshire after the Duke of Atholl). Latterly it was owned by local Conservative politician John "Jock" Stewart~MacKay MBE of nearby Killicrankie, who sold it in 1981.

On 13 March 2008, Blair Atholl won the appeal to be in the Cairngorms National Park, making it likely Blair Castle will become a more popular attraction.

== Village ==
Until the early 19th century the only building on the site of the present village was Blair Atholl Mill. It began to grow around the present parish church, largely as a planned settlement, when this was moved from Old Blair. The arrival of the railway linking Perth with Inverness in 1863 and the building of the main A9 North Road encouraged the growth of the village, though the A9 has bypassed it since the 1980s.

The Atholl Country Life Museum in the village has displays on the social history of the area. It is open in the summer, with an entrance charge.

A peculiar quirk of the town is ownership of the water supply. As a result of an unusual legal agreement made in 1911 for the benefit of steam trains, the responsibility for the public water supply to the people of Blair Atholl has been held by the railway companies who own the line through Blair Atholl, currently Network Rail. In April 2006, it was announced that Network Rail would finance the cost of connecting the Blair Atholl and Bridge of Tilt (Scottish Gaelic: Drochaid Theilt) to Scottish Water's supply.

== Transport ==
The town has a railway station on the Highland Main Line. The main road north from Perth to Inverness, the A9, ran through the village until it was bypassed in 1984.

Blair Atholl Airfield (owned by Lude House) is located to the east of the village, on the northern side of the B8079. Its ICAO airport code is GB-0329. Its single runway, a grass strip, is numbered 12 and 30.

== Jamborette ==
Since its inception in 1946, Blair Atholl Patrol Jamborette has taken place every two years in the grounds of Blair Castle. Scotland's largest regular Scout Camp is usually attended by around 1,200 participants, half Scottish Scouts, and half Internationals, from countries including Austria, Belgium, Canada, Denmark, Gibraltar, Hong Kong, Iceland, Japan, Malawi, Netherlands, Norway, Sweden, Poland, Russia, Singapore, South Africa and the United States. The camp is divided into six sub-camps: MacDonald, Maclean, Murray, Morrison, Robertson and Stewart. The 2010 camp saw John Kennedy retire as the camp chief, after 12 years in the role, handing over to Andrew Sharkey who led the next Jamborette in 2012. In recognition of Kennedy's outstanding services, Eleanor Lyall, the Chief Commissioner for Scotland, presented him with the Silver Wolf, the highest award in adult Scouting. The Jamborette of 2020 was cancelled, due to the COVID-19 outbreak.

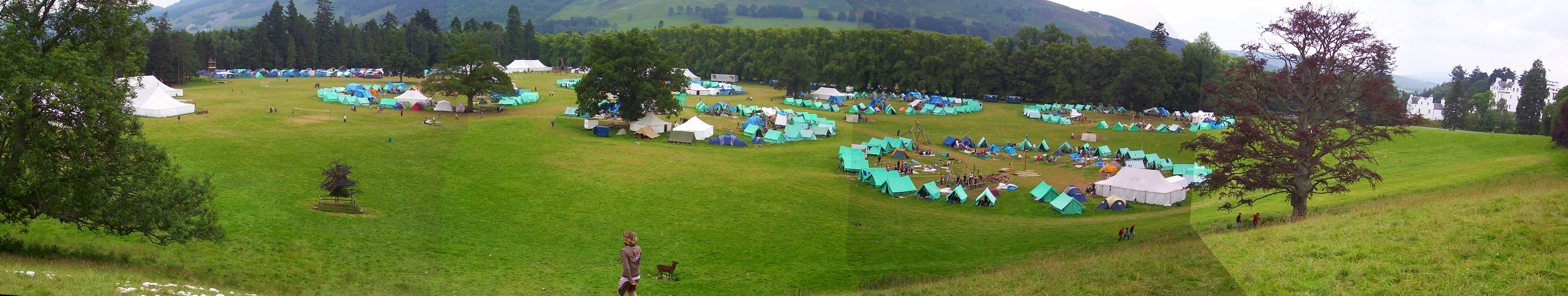
Blair Atholl Jamborette, 2004

== See also ==
- Bohespic
