= Perth and Kinross =

Council area of Scotland

Perth and Kinross: Peairt agus Ceann Rois (Scottish Gaelic); Pairth an Kinross (Scots)
- Lieutenancy and council area
- Coat of arms

- Perth and Kinross shown within Scotland
- Coordinates: 56°23′45″N 03°26′00″W
- Sovereign state: United Kingdom
- Country: Scotland
- Unitary authority: 1 April 1996
- Administrative HQ: 2 High Street, Perth

Government
  - Type: Council
  - Body: Perth and Kinross Council
  - Control: No overall control
  - MPs: 2 MPs: Dave Doogan (SNP); Pete Wishart (SNP)
  - MSPs: 2 MSPs: Jim Fairlie (SNP); John Swinney (SNP)

Area
  - Total: 2,041 sq mi (5,286 km^{2})
  - Rank: 5th

Population (2024)
  - Total: 154,420
  - Rank: 12th
  - Density: 75/sq mi (29/km^{2})
- Time zone: UTC+0 (GMT)
  - Summer (DST): UTC+1 (BST)
- ISO 3166 code: GB-PKN
- GSS code: S12000048
- Website: www.pkc.gov.uk

Perth and Kinross (Scots: Pairth an Kinross; Scottish Gaelic: Peairt agus Ceann Rois) is one of the 32 council areas of Scotland, and a lieutenancy area. It is bordered by Highland and Aberdeenshire to the north, Angus, Dundee, and Fife to the east, Clackmannanshire to the south, and Stirling and Argyll and Bute to the west.

Geographically the area is split by the Highland Boundary Fault into a more mountainous northern part and a flatter southern part. The northern area is a popular tourist spot, while agriculture makes an important contribution to the southern part of the area.

The area is run by Perth and Kinross Council, which is based in Perth.

== History ==
The area takes its name from the two historical shires of Perthshire and Kinross-shire. Each was administered by a sheriff from medieval times, supplemented by commissioners of supply from 1667 and then by a county council from 1890.

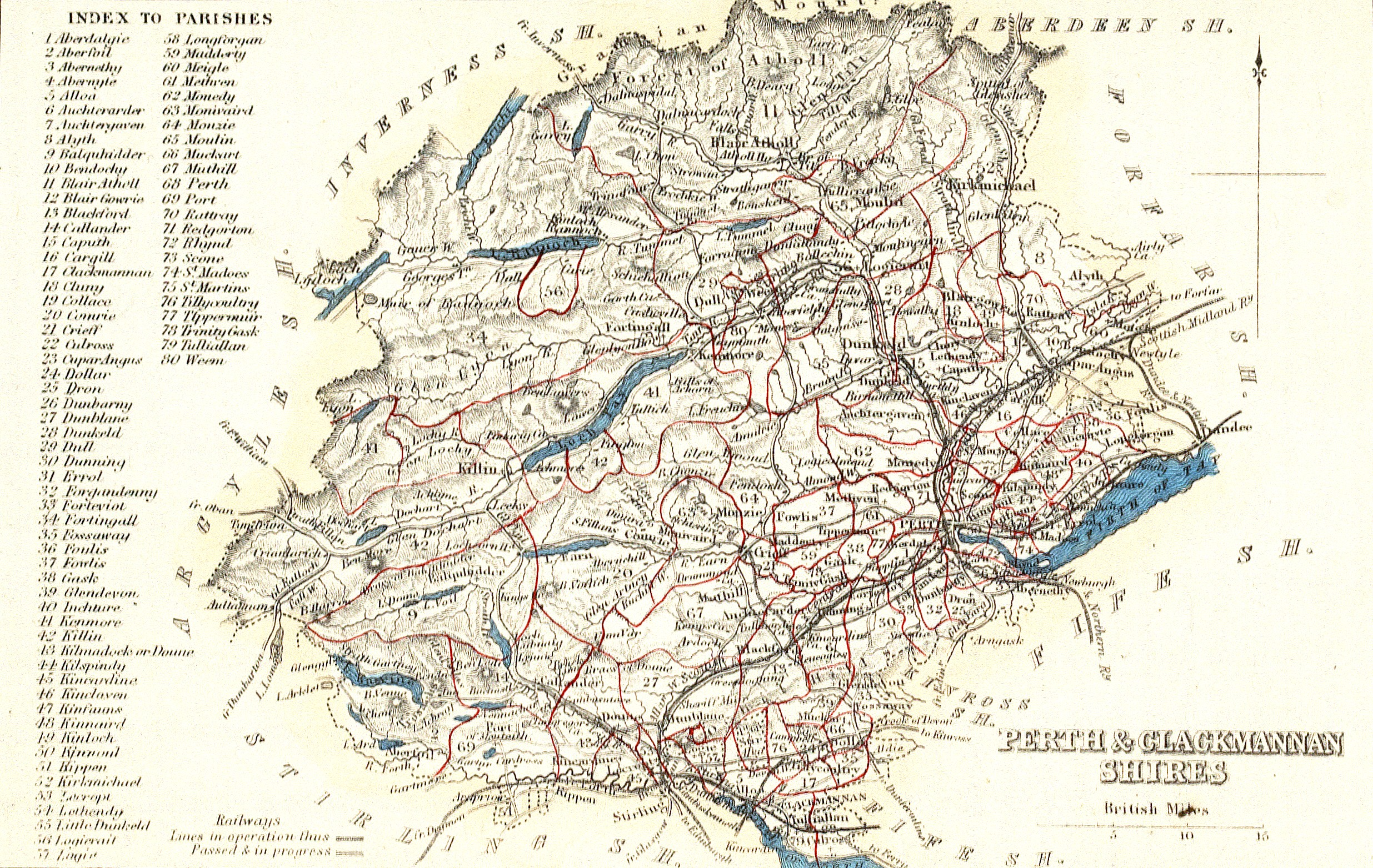
Perth & Clackmannan Shires. 1854. Civil Parish map

Perthshire was one of the largest counties, whereas Kinross-shire was one of the smallest; it was the least populous Scottish county in the 1921 census. In 1930 the county councils for Perthshire and Kinross-shire were combined for most purposes. The two councils continued to be elected as separate bodies, but operated together as the 'Perth and Kinross Joint County Council', serving the combined area of the two counties.

Local government was reformed in Scotland in 1975 under the Local Government (Scotland) Act 1973. Mainland Scotland's counties, burghs and landward districts were replaced with a two-tier structure of upper-tier regions and lower-tier districts. Perth and Kinross was created as one of the districts within the Tayside region. As established in 1975, Perth and Kinross covered the whole of Kinross-shire, and the majority of the pre-1975 Perthshire, with three exceptions: a large area in the south-west of the county which went to the new Stirling district, Muckhart which went to Clackmannan district, and Longforgan which went to the city of Dundee. Perth and Kinross also included the parish of Kettins from Angus. A lieutenancy area covering the same area as the new district was created at the same time.

In 1996, local government in Scotland was reformed again under the Local Government etc. (Scotland) Act 1994. The regions and districts were abolished and replaced by unitary council areas. One such area was named by the 1994 Act as 'Perthshire and Kinross', covering the area of the 1975–1996 district of Perth and Kinross, plus an area transferred from Dundee roughly matching the pre-1975 parish of Longforgan. The shadow authority elected in 1995 to oversee the transition requested a change of name from 'Perthshire and Kinross' to 'Perth and Kinross' in December 1995, which was agreed by the government before the new council area came into force on 1 April 1996. The Perth and Kinross lieutenancy area was adjusted to match the new council area in 1996.

== Geography ==
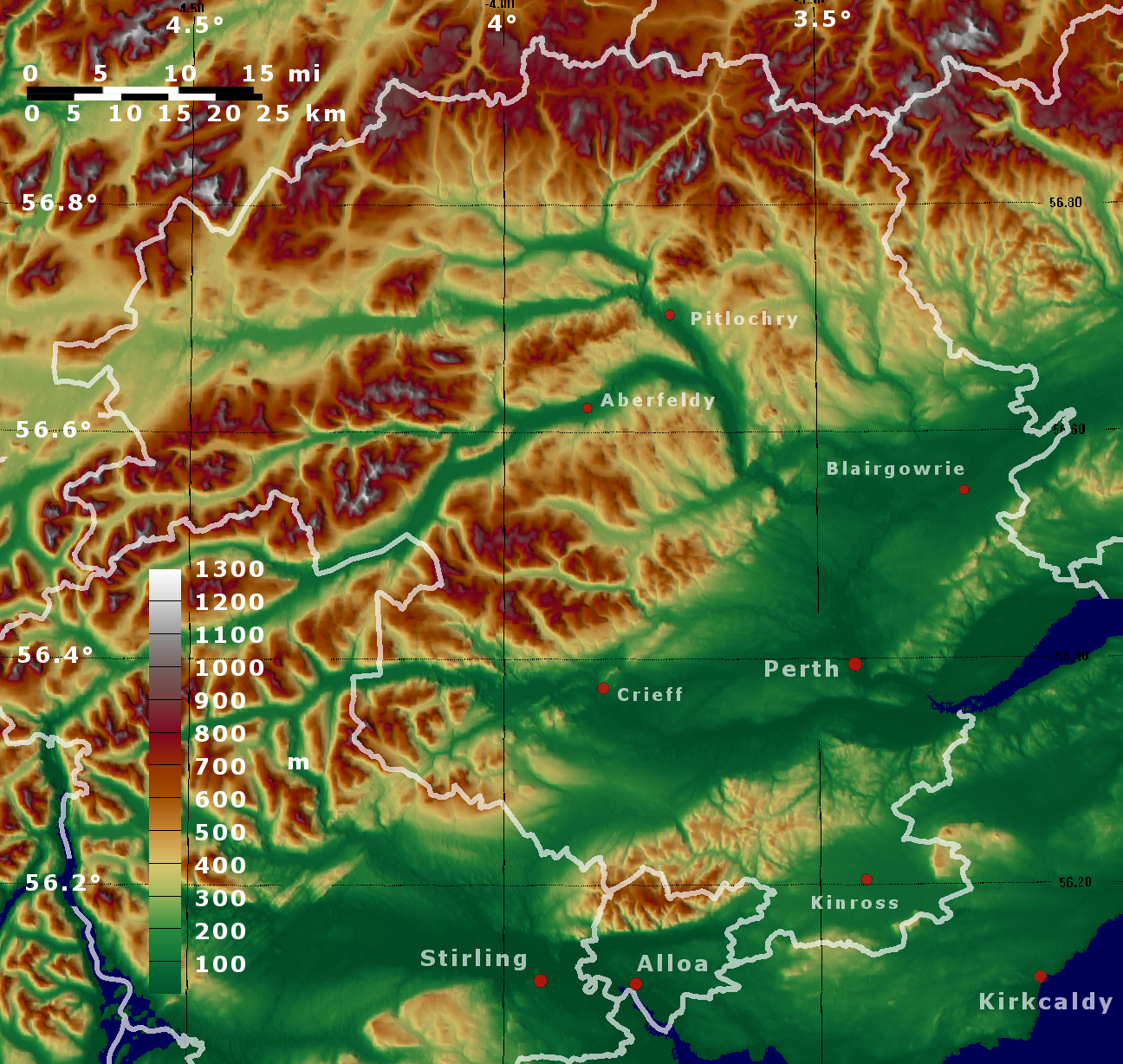
Topographic map of Perth and Kinross

The Highland Boundary Fault runs across the region from the northeast to the southwest. This roughly divides the area between highland Perthshire, including part of the Grampian Mountains, to the north, and lowland Perthshire and Kinross to the south. The highland area is intersected with glacial valleys, often containing ribbon lakes, including Loch Tay and Loch Earn. The lowland area is a fertile region lying within the Central Lowlands.

River Tay, the longest river in Scotland, flows through the mountainous terrains of Perthshire and Kinross. Emerging from Loch Tay, it flows eastward and, after joining the River Isla, it turns south and runs through Perth, before entering the Firth of Tay.

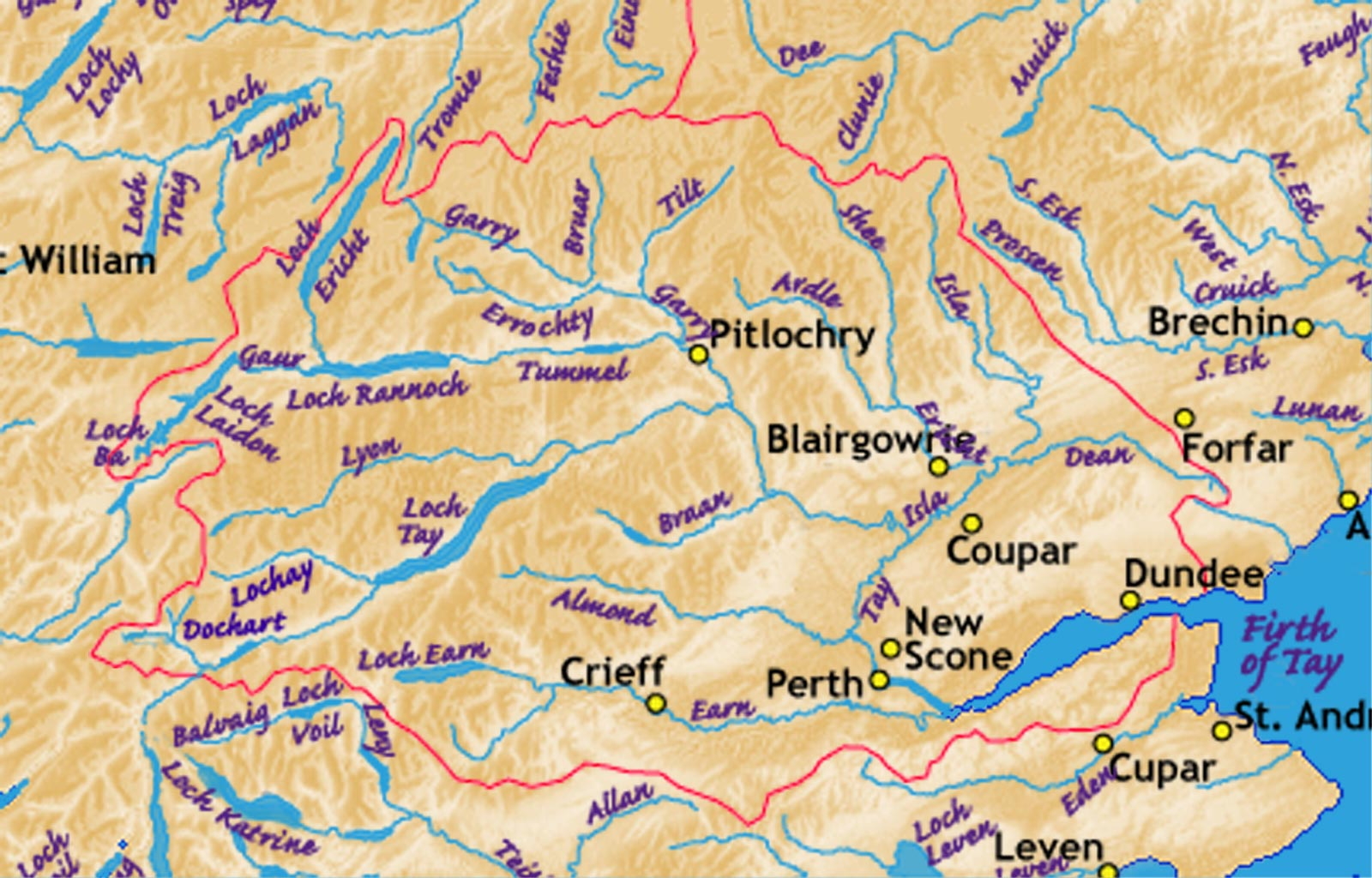
Catchment of the River Tay.

== Languages ==
The 2022 Scottish Census reported that out of 147,257 residents aged three and over, 46,713 (31.7%) considered themselves able to speak or read the Scots language.

The 2022 Scottish Census reported that out of 147,254 residents aged three and over, 1,974 (1.3%) considered themselves able to speak or read Gaelic.

== Economy ==
In the southern part of Perth and Kinross agriculture plays an important part of the local economy. This includes the cultivation of fruits, fodder, wheat and seed potatoes.

The scenic nature of the northern part of Perth and Kinross makes tourism an important part of the economy. The Forestry Commission controls large parts of the area, which is also home to a number of hydroelectric dams.

== Settlements ==
The largest settlements in Perth and Kinross

=== Largest settlements by population ===
Settlement	Population (2020)
Perth	47,350
Blairgowrie and Rattray	9,240
Crieff	7,280
Auchterarder	5,840
Kinross	5,610
Scone	5,030
Bridge of Earn	2,920
Pitlochry	2,880
Alyth	2,370
Coupar Angus	2,220
Milnathort	1,950
Aberfeldy	1,940
Comrie	1,900
Invergowrie	1,750
Luncarty	1,630
Stanley	1,500
Errol	1,490
Inchture	1,420
Abernethy	1,390
Almondbank	1,370

== Places of interest ==
- Ashintully Castle
- Atholl Country Life Museum
- Ben Lawers
- Blackhall Roman Camps
- Blair Atholl Mill
- Blair Castle
- Cateran Trail
- Cairngorms National Park
- Castle Menzies
- Clan Donnachaidh Centre
- Cluny House Gardens
- Dirnanean House
- Drummond Castle
- Edradour Distillery
- Elcho Castle
- Forest of Atholl
- Fortingall Yew
- Glen Lyon
- Grampian Mountains
- Kindrogan House
- Lendrick Muir School
- Loch Earn
- Loch Lomond and the Trossachs National Park
- Loch Rannoch
- Loch Tay
- Melville Monument
- Portmoak
- Rannoch Moor
- Strathearn
- Whitefield Castle

== Politics and governance ==
=== Local government ===
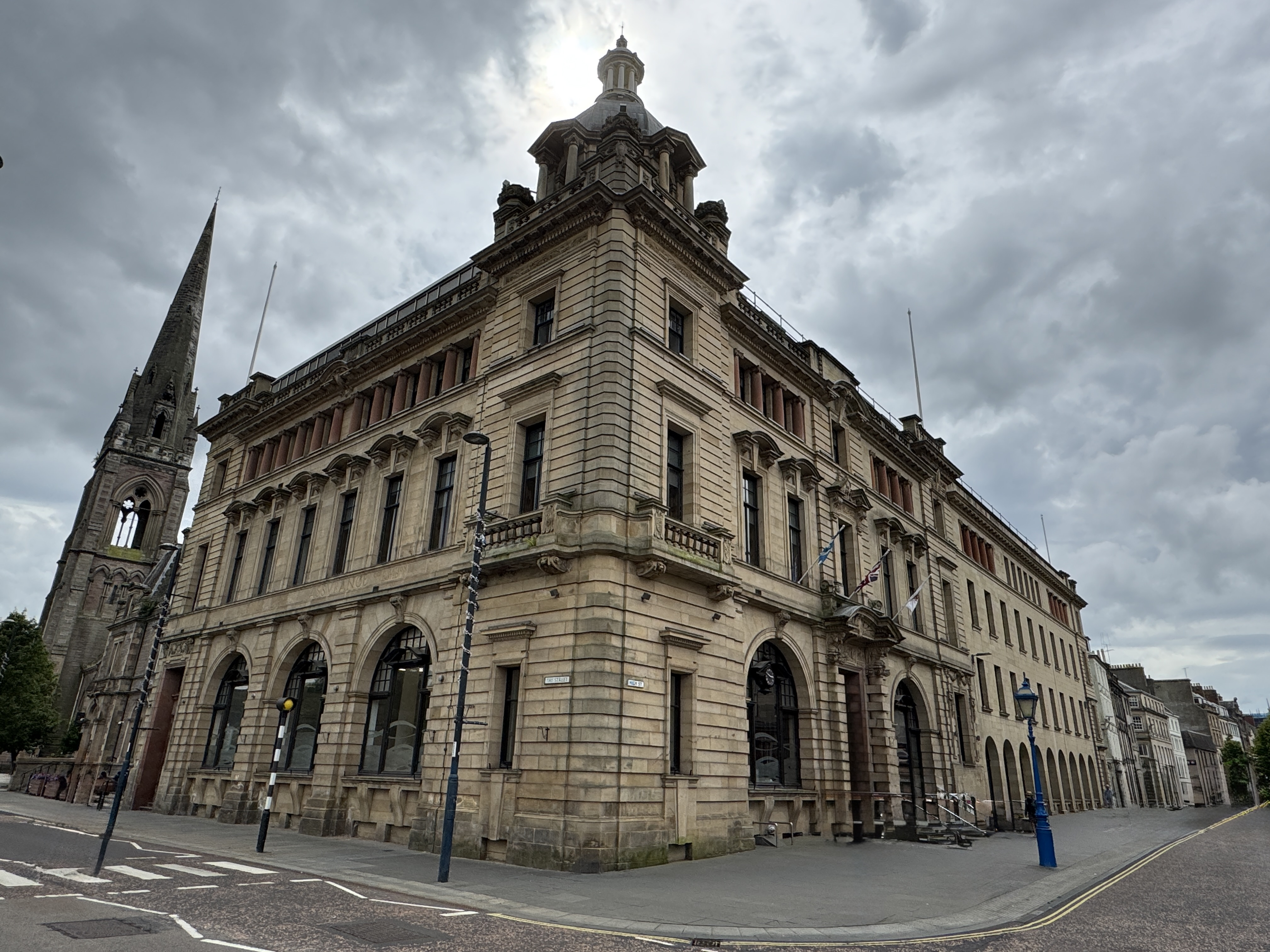
2 High Street, Perth: Council's headquarters

The local authority is Perth and Kinross Council, which meets at 2 High Street, Perth.

=== Scottish Parliament ===
Perth and Kinross is covered by two Scottish Parliament constituencies and one electoral region. Following the 2021 Scottish Parliament election these two constituencies—Perthshire South and Kinross-shire and Perthshire North—are held respectively by Jim Fairlie and John Swinney, both members of the Scottish National Party. Following the same election the electoral region—Mid Scotland and Fife—is represented by four members of the Scottish Conservatives, two members of Scottish Labour, and one member of the Scottish Greens.

=== UK Parliament ===
Perth and Kinross is covered by three United Kingdom Parliament constituencies; Perth and Kinross-shire, Angus and Perthshire Glens and Stirling and Strathallan. Following the 2024 UK Parliamentary General Election these seats are respectively held by Pete Wishart (Scottish National Party), Dave Doogan (Scottish National Party) and Chris Kane (Labour Party).

=== Referendums ===
On 18 September 2014, Perth and Kinross voted strongly "No" in the Scottish Independence Referendum, with a majority of 60.2% on a record turnout of 86.9%.

On 23 June 2016, Perth and Kinross voted in favour of remain in the Brexit referendum, with a majority of 61.1% on a turnout of 73.7%.

== See also ==
- Perth and Kinross Council
- Perth and Kinross Spirit of Youth Awards
- List of places in Perth and Kinross
