= List of listed buildings in Perth and Kinross =

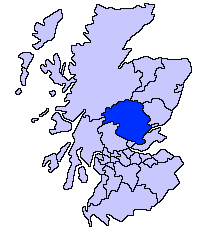
Perth and Kinross shown within Scotland

This is a list of listed buildings in Perth and Kinross. The list is split out by parish.

- List of listed buildings in Aberdalgie, Perth and Kinross
- List of listed buildings in Aberfeldy, Perth and Kinross
- List of listed buildings in Abernethy, Perth and Kinross
- List of listed buildings in Abernyte, Perth and Kinross
- List of listed buildings in Alyth, Perth and Kinross
- List of listed buildings in Ardoch, Perth and Kinross
- List of listed buildings in Arngask, Perth and Kinross
- List of listed buildings in Auchterarder, Perth and Kinross
- List of listed buildings in Auchtergaven, Perth and Kinross
- List of listed buildings in Bendochy, Perth and Kinross
- List of listed buildings in Blackford, Perth and Kinross
- List of listed buildings in Blair Atholl, Perth and Kinross
- List of listed buildings in Blairgowrie And Rattray, Perth and Kinross
- List of listed buildings in Blairgowrie, Perth and Kinross
- List of listed buildings in Caputh, Perth and Kinross
- List of listed buildings in Cargill, Perth and Kinross
- List of listed buildings in Cleish, Perth and Kinross
- List of listed buildings in Clunie, Perth and Kinross
- List of listed buildings in Collace, Perth and Kinross
- List of listed buildings in Comrie, Perth and Kinross
- List of listed buildings in Coupar Angus, Perth and Kinross
- List of listed buildings in Crieff, Perth and Kinross
- List of listed buildings in Dron, Perth and Kinross
- List of listed buildings in Dull, Perth and Kinross
- List of listed buildings in Dunbarney, Perth and Kinross
- List of listed buildings in Dunkeld And Dowally, Perth and Kinross
- List of listed buildings in Dunning, Perth and Kinross
- List of listed buildings in Errol, Perth and Kinross
- List of listed buildings in Findo Gask, Perth and Kinross
- List of listed buildings in Forgandenny, Perth and Kinross
- List of listed buildings in Forteviot, Perth and Kinross
- List of listed buildings in Fortingall, Perth and Kinross
- List of listed buildings in Fossoway, Perth and Kinross
- List of listed buildings in Fowlis Wester, Perth and Kinross
- List of listed buildings in Glendevon, Perth and Kinross
- List of listed buildings in Inchture, Perth and Kinross
- List of listed buildings in Kenmore, Perth and Kinross
- List of listed buildings in Kettins, Perth and Kinross
- List of listed buildings in Kilspindie, Perth and Kinross
- List of listed buildings in Kinclaven, Perth and Kinross
- List of listed buildings in Kinfauns, Perth and Kinross
- List of listed buildings in Kinloch, Perth and Kinross
- List of listed buildings in Kinnaird, Perth and Kinross
- List of listed buildings in Kinnoull, Perth and Kinross
- List of listed buildings in Kinross, Perth and Kinross
- List of listed buildings in Kirkmichael, Perth and Kinross
- List of listed buildings in Lethendy, Perth and Kinross
- List of listed buildings in Liff And Benvie, Perth and Kinross
- List of listed buildings in Little Dunkeld, Perth and Kinross
- List of listed buildings in Logiealmond, Perth and Kinross
- List of listed buildings in Logierait, Perth and Kinross
- List of listed buildings in Longforgan, Perth and Kinross
- List of listed buildings in Madderty, Perth and Kinross
- List of listed buildings in Meigle, Perth and Kinross
- List of listed buildings in Methven, Perth and Kinross
- List of listed buildings in Moneydie, Perth and Kinross
- List of listed buildings in Monzievaird And Strowan, Perth and Kinross
- List of listed buildings in Moulin, Perth and Kinross
- List of listed buildings in Muckhart, Perth and Kinross
- List of listed buildings in Muthill, Perth and Kinross
- List of listed buildings in Orwell, Perth and Kinross
- List of listed buildings in Perth, Perth and Kinross
- List of listed buildings in Pitlochry, Perth and Kinross
- List of listed buildings in Portmoak, Perth and Kinross
- List of listed buildings in Rattray, Perth and Kinross
- List of listed buildings in Redgorton, Perth and Kinross
- List of listed buildings in Rhynd, Perth and Kinross
- List of listed buildings in Scone, Perth and Kinross
- List of listed buildings in St Madoes, Perth and Kinross
- List of listed buildings in St Martins, Perth and Kinross
- List of listed buildings in Tibbermore, Perth and Kinross
- List of listed buildings in Trinity Gask, Perth and Kinross
- List of listed buildings in Weem, Perth and Kinross

== See also ==
- Scheduled monuments in Perth and Kinross
