= List of listed buildings in Kenmore, Perth and Kinross =

This is a list of listed buildings in the parish of Kenmore in Perth and Kinross, Scotland.

== List ==
Name	Location	Date Listed	Grid Ref. (Note: Sometimes known as OSGB36, the grid reference (where provided) is based on the British national grid reference system used by the Ordnance Survey. • "Guide to National Grid". Ordnance Survey. • "Get-a-map". Ordnance Survey.)	Geo-coordinates	Notes	LB Number (Note: Historic Environment Scotland assign a unique alphanumeric identifier to each designated site in Scotland, for listed buildings this always begins with "LB", for example "LB12345".)	Image
Acharn Cottages To North Of B Road From Killin To Kenmore At Acharn				56°34′13″N 4°01′31″W	Category C(S)	13803	Upload Photo
Kenmore Gate To Taymouth Castle, E. Side Of Square, With Flanking Walls On Either Side				56°35′07″N 3°59′54″W	Category B	13807	Upload another image
Masonic Hall, N. Side Of Square				56°35′07″N 3°59′57″W	Category B	12121	Upload Photo
Lawers Church				56°31′41″N 4°09′06″W	Category B	13806	Upload Photo
Taymouth Castle				56°35′41″N 3°58′53″W	Category A	12093	Upload Photo
Isle Of Loch Tay				56°35′02″N 4°00′37″W	Category B	12103	Upload Photo
Bridge Over Allt A' Mhoirneas Near Rynachulig				56°29′52″N 4°15′02″W	Category C(S)	12110	Upload Photo
Nurses' Cottage S. Side Of Square				56°35′05″N 3°59′57″W	Category C(S)	12128	Upload Photo
Mrs. Mcdiarmid, The Brae, E. Side				56°35′04″N 3°59′52″W	Category B	12130	Upload Photo
Kenmore Park - Wall Running From Council Housing At The Brae To Near The Killin - Aberfeldy Road Junction				56°34′54″N 3°59′45″W	Category C(S)	12133	Upload Photo
Deuchar, The Brae, W. Side				56°35′06″N 3°59′55″W	Category C(S)	12134	Upload Photo
Bridge Cottage (Former Orphanage)				56°35′07″N 4°00′07″W	Category B	12135	Upload Photo
The Boathouse (Hotel Accommodation)				56°35′07″N 4°00′00″W	Category C(S)	12136	Upload Photo
Dairy Byre, Taymouth				56°35′13″N 3°59′10″W	Category B	44966	Upload Photo
Acharn, Fernbank				56°34′10″N 4°01′39″W	Category B	12434	Upload Photo
Acharn, Pine Cottage				56°34′10″N 4°01′33″W	Category B	12085	Upload Photo
The Mains Kenmore				56°35′19″N 4°00′08″W	Category B	12087	Upload Photo
The Fort				56°35′30″N 3°58′20″W	Category B	12095	Upload Photo
Chinese Bridge				56°35′48″N 3°59′05″W	Category A	12097	Upload another image
Old Toll House. Lawers				56°31′59″N 4°08′53″W	Category C(S)	12105	Upload Photo
Ardeonaig Church (Disused) (At The Old Manse)				56°30′22″N 4°08′35″W	Category B	12111	Upload Photo
Parish Churchyard Wall And Wall Running N.W. From It To Grounds Of Bridge House				56°35′04″N 4°00′04″W	Category C(S)	12119	Upload Photo
Mr Mcintyre, S. Side Of Square				56°35′05″N 3°59′56″W	Category C(S)	12126	Upload Photo
Empty Cottage, S. Side Of Square				56°35′05″N 3°59′58″W	Category C(S)	12129	Upload Photo
Empty Cottage, The Brae, E. Side				56°35′04″N 4°00′03″W	Category B	12131	Upload Photo
'Maxwell's Temple', Or 'The Cross'				56°35′23″N 3°59′43″W	Category A	13804	Upload Photo
Urn At Termination Of Dairy Drive (Marked 'Monument' On O.S. Map)				56°35′24″N 3°59′21″W	Category B	13805	Upload Photo
Portbane				56°35′04″N 3°59′58″W	Category B	12084	Upload Photo
The Tower				56°35′12″N 3°58′13″W	Category B	12086	Upload Photo
Taymouth Dairy And Terrace On West				56°35′21″N 3°59′19″W	Category A	12091	Upload Photo
Fort Lodge				56°35′28″N 3°58′18″W	Category A	12096	Upload Photo
Rustic Lodge				56°36′25″N 3°58′26″W	Category A	12100	Upload Photo
Lawers Mill (Formerly Grain Mill)				56°31′58″N 4°08′55″W	Category B	12107	Upload Photo
Remony				56°34′19″N 4°01′05″W	Category B	12115	Upload Photo
The Beeches (Former Lodge Of Taymouth Castle)				56°35′11″N 4°00′06″W	Category C(S)	12139	Upload Photo
Ice House, Taymouth				56°35′44″N 3°58′52″W	Category B	44965	Upload Photo
Edramucky, Steading, Aqueduct And Water Wheel				56°29′52″N 4°14′39″W	Category B	12109	Upload Photo
Kenmore Hotel, N Side Of Square				56°35′07″N 3°59′57″W	Category B	12122	Upload another image
R.D. Davidson (Post Office) S. Side Of Square				56°35′06″N 3°59′55″W	Category C(S)	12125	Upload Photo
Manse Of Kenmore				56°34′45″N 3°59′58″W	Category C(S)	12140	Upload Photo
Bridge Over Taymouth Burn Near Gravel Pits				56°35′37″N 3°58′30″W	Category B	12094	Upload Photo
Delarb Rustic Lodge And Gatepiers				56°35′01″N 4°00′56″W	Category B	12102	Upload Photo
Haugh Cottages, Acharn				56°34′11″N 4°01′40″W	Category B	12112	Upload Photo
Bridge Carrying Aberfeldy - Kenmore Road Over Taymouth Burn				56°35′05″N 3°58′57″W	Category B	12088	Upload Photo
Apollo's Temple				56°35′10″N 3°59′09″W	Category B	12089	Upload Photo
Rock Lodge				56°35′51″N 3°59′10″W	Category B	12098	Upload Photo
Star Battery, Inchadney				56°35′43″N 3°58′31″W	Category B	12099	Upload Photo
Walled Garden				56°35′13″N 4°00′21″W	Category B	12101	Upload Photo
Old Church, Lawers				56°31′42″N 4°08′29″W	Category B	12108	Upload Photo
West House (Hotel Property) N. Side Of Square				56°35′07″N 3°59′57″W	Category C(S)	12120	Upload Photo
Library And Librarian's House, N. Side Of Square, With Wall At Rear On W				56°35′07″N 3°59′55″W	Category B	12123	Upload Photo
Miss Mcandrew, The Brae, E. Side				56°35′04″N 3°59′58″W	Category B	12132	Upload Photo
Lawers Smithy				56°31′58″N 4°08′57″W	Category C(S)	12433	Upload Photo
Bridge Over Taymouth Burn, E. Of Apollo's Temple				56°35′12″N 3°59′01″W	Category B	12090	Upload Photo
Ramparts On River Bank S.W. Of Taymouth Castle				56°35′33″N 3°59′04″W	Category B	12092	Upload Photo
Lawers Mill Bridge Over Dubh Eas				56°31′59″N 4°08′54″W	Category C(S)	12106	Upload Photo
The Old Mill, Acharn, (Lochtayside Crafts)				56°34′12″N 4°01′34″W	Category C(S)	12113	Upload Photo
Acharn Hermitage				56°33′51″N 4°01′29″W	Category C(S)	12114	Upload Photo
Parish Church				56°35′05″N 4°00′02″W	Category B	12118	Upload another image
Hotel Annexe And Gate House, S. Side Of Square				56°35′06″N 3°59′53″W	Category C(S)	12124	Upload Photo
Mr Roy S. Side Of Square				56°35′05″N 3°59′57″W	Category C(S)	12127	Upload Photo
Gate And Wall Running From S. Approach Of Bridge To Boathouse				56°35′07″N 4°00′04″W	Category B	12137	Upload Photo
Kenmore Bridge Over River Tay				56°35′09″N 4°00′07″W	Category A	12138	Upload Photo

== Key ==
The scheme for classifying buildings in Scotland is:

- Category A: "buildings of national or international importance, either architectural or historic; or fine, little-altered examples of some particular period, style or building type."
- Category B: "buildings of regional or more than local importance; or major examples of some particular period, style or building type, which may have been altered."
- Category C: "buildings of local importance; lesser examples of any period, style, or building type, as originally constructed or moderately altered; and simple traditional buildings which group well with other listed buildings."

In March 2016 there were 47,288 listed buildings in Scotland. Of these, 8% were Category A, and 50% were Category B, with the remaining 42% being Category C.
