= List of listed buildings in Collace, Perth and Kinross =

This is a list of listed buildings in the parish of Collace in Perth and Kinross, Scotland.

== List ==
Name	Location	Date Listed	Grid Ref. (Note: Sometimes known as OSGB36, the grid reference (where provided) is based on the British national grid reference system used by the Ordnance Survey. • "Guide to National Grid". Ordnance Survey. • "Get-a-map". Ordnance Survey.)	Geo-coordinates	Notes	LB Number (Note: Historic Environment Scotland assign a unique alphanumeric identifier to each designated site in Scotland, for listed buildings this always begins with "LB", for example "LB12345".)	Image
Bandirran Dovecot				56°27′30″N 3°18′13″W	Category B	5654	Upload Photo
Bonarwood (Former Free Church Manse)				56°28′29″N 3°18′11″W	Category B	5660	Upload Photo
Newhall Cottages (One Till Lately Old Schoolhouse, Former Free Church School)				56°28′31″N 3°19′16″W	Category C(S)	5659	Upload Photo
Morthouse Collace Churchyard				56°28′23″N 3°18′17″W	Category B	5652	Upload Photo
Collace Churchyard				56°28′23″N 3°18′18″W	Category B	5653	Upload Photo
31 Kinrossie				56°28′36″N 3°19′08″W	Category B	5657	Upload Photo
Milton, Farmhouse				56°29′30″N 3°18′34″W	Category C(S)	5664	Upload Photo
Collace Parish Church				56°28′23″N 3°18′20″W	Category B	5650	Upload Photo
Bandirran Walled Garden				56°27′31″N 3°18′11″W	Category C(S)	5655	Upload Photo
Dunsinnan Lodge And Gates				56°29′04″N 3°21′41″W	Category C(S)	5663	Upload Photo
Market Cross, Kinrossie				56°28′36″N 3°19′08″W	Category B	5656	Upload Photo
Dunsinnan House				56°28′50″N 3°21′11″W	Category B	5661	Upload Photo
Nairne Mausoleum (Former Parish Church) Collace Churchyard				56°28′23″N 3°18′19″W	Category B	5651	Upload Photo
Hall, Formerly Free Church, Kinrossie				56°28′33″N 3°19′08″W	Category C(S)	5658	Upload Photo
Dunsinnan Home Farm				56°28′52″N 3°21′05″W	Category B	5662	Upload Photo

== Key ==
The scheme for classifying buildings in Scotland is:

- Category A: "buildings of national or international importance, either architectural or historic; or fine, little-altered examples of some particular period, style or building type."
- Category B: "buildings of regional or more than local importance; or major examples of some particular period, style or building type, which may have been altered."
- Category C: "buildings of local importance; lesser examples of any period, style, or building type, as originally constructed or moderately altered; and simple traditional buildings which group well with other listed buildings."

In March 2016 there were 47,288 listed buildings in Scotland. Of these, 8% were Category A, and 50% were Category B, with the remaining 42% being Category C.
