= List of listed buildings in Lethendy, Perth and Kinross =

This is a list of listed buildings in the parish of Lethendy in Perth and Kinross, Scotland.

== List ==
Name	Location	Date Listed	Grid Ref. (Note: Sometimes known as OSGB36, the grid reference (where provided) is based on the British national grid reference system used by the Ordnance Survey. • "Guide to National Grid". Ordnance Survey. • "Get-a-map". Ordnance Survey.)	Geo-coordinates	Notes	LB Number (Note: Historic Environment Scotland assign a unique alphanumeric identifier to each designated site in Scotland, for listed buildings this always begins with "LB", for example "LB12345".)	Image
Lethendy Tower, East Lodge				56°33′42″N 3°23′33″W	Category C(S)	11244	Upload Photo
Lethendy Tower, West Lodge				56°33′40″N 3°24′01″W	Category C(S)	11245	Upload Photo
Tower of Lethendy				56°33′34″N 3°24′00″W	Category B	11243	Upload Photo
Lethendy Kirkyard				56°33′36″N 3°25′02″W	Category C(S)	12415	Upload Photo
Lethendy Kirk				56°33′37″N 3°25′02″W	Category B	11242	Upload Photo
Lethendy Bank, Farmhouse (Empty In 1969)				56°33′50″N 3°24′39″W	Category B	11246	Upload Photo

== Key ==
The scheme for classifying buildings in Scotland is:

- Category A: "buildings of national or international importance, either architectural or historic; or fine, little-altered examples of some particular period, style or building type."
- Category B: "buildings of regional or more than local importance; or major examples of some particular period, style or building type, which may have been altered."
- Category C: "buildings of local importance; lesser examples of any period, style, or building type, as originally constructed or moderately altered; and simple traditional buildings which group well with other listed buildings."

In March 2016 there were 47,288 listed buildings in Scotland. Of these, 8% were Category A, and 50% were Category B, with the remaining 42% being Category C.
