= List of listed buildings in Ardoch, Perth and Kinross =

This is a list of listed buildings in the parish of Ardoch in Perth and Kinross, Scotland.

== List ==
Name	Location	Date Listed	Grid Ref. (Note: Sometimes known as OSGB36, the grid reference (where provided) is based on the British national grid reference system used by the Ordnance Survey. • "Guide to National Grid". Ordnance Survey. • "Get-a-map". Ordnance Survey.)	Geo-coordinates	Notes	LB Number (Note: Historic Environment Scotland assign a unique alphanumeric identifier to each designated site in Scotland, for listed buildings this always begins with "LB", for example "LB12345".)	Image
Kaimes Cottage				56°17′41″N 3°50′28″W	Category B	6500	Upload Photo
Blackhill Cottages, West Cottage				56°16′37″N 3°52′21″W	Category B	5807	Upload Photo
Orchill (North) Lodge				56°17′40″N 3°50′26″W	Category B	5809	Upload another image
Blackhill Old Toll				56°16′30″N 3°52′35″W	Category C(S)	5806	Upload Photo
Braco, Front Street, Little Ardoch Including Railings				56°15′57″N 3°52′44″W	Category C(S)	51259	Upload Photo
Orchill Home Farm Cottage				56°16′58″N 3°49′37″W	Category C(S)	6575	Upload Photo
Free Church Tower, Ardoch				56°15′55″N 3°52′51″W	Category C(S)	5795	Upload another image
Greenloaning Inn				56°14′41″N 3°53′00″W	Category C(S)	5799	Upload Photo
Nether Braco Farmhouse				56°16′20″N 3°53′15″W	Category B	5802	Upload Photo
Orchill Den Former Stables And Coachhouse To Orchill New House				56°16′58″N 3°49′59″W	Category B	6577	Upload Photo
Ardoch Old Bridge Over River Knaik				56°16′03″N 3°52′41″W	Category B	5796	Upload another image See more images
Greenloaning Church. (Former Antiburgher Church)				56°14′32″N 3°53′08″W	Category C(S)	5798	Upload Photo
Rottearns (Toll-House)				56°14′32″N 3°52′40″W	Category C(S)	5800	Upload Photo
Feddal Castle				56°15′21″N 3°54′10″W	Category B	5801	Upload Photo
Orchill Home Farm Dairy				56°16′56″N 3°49′32″W	Category C(S)	6576	Upload Photo
Old House Of Orchill				56°16′56″N 3°49′57″W	Category B	5808	Upload Photo
Orchill New House				56°17′07″N 3°49′48″W	Category B	6583	Upload Photo
Parish Church Of Ardoch				56°15′59″N 3°52′45″W	Category C(S)	5794	Upload another image
J.N. Forsyth, Victoriana Shop Braco Village				56°15′56″N 3°52′44″W	Category C(S)	5797	Upload Photo
Nether Braco, Steading				56°16′21″N 3°53′15″W	Category C(S)	5803	Upload Photo
Braco Sawmill				56°16′28″N 3°53′41″W	Category B	5805	Upload Photo
Wester Ardoch (Former Manse Of Ardoch)				56°15′53″N 3°53′05″W	Category C(S)	72	Upload Photo
Braco Castle				56°16′46″N 3°54′08″W	Category B	5804	Upload another image See more images

== Key ==
The scheme for classifying buildings in Scotland is:

- Category A: "buildings of national or international importance, either architectural or historic; or fine, little-altered examples of some particular period, style or building type."
- Category B: "buildings of regional or more than local importance; or major examples of some particular period, style or building type, which may have been altered."
- Category C: "buildings of local importance; lesser examples of any period, style, or building type, as originally constructed or moderately altered; and simple traditional buildings which group well with other listed buildings."

In March 2016 there were 47,288 listed buildings in Scotland. Of these, 8% were Category A, and 50% were Category B, with the remaining 42% being Category C.
