= List of listed buildings in Moulin, Perth and Kinross =

This is a list of listed buildings in the parish of Moulin in Perth and Kinross, Scotland.

== List ==
Name	Location	Date Listed	Grid Ref. (Note: Sometimes known as OSGB36, the grid reference (where provided) is based on the British national grid reference system used by the Ordnance Survey. • "Guide to National Grid". Ordnance Survey. • "Get-a-map". Ordnance Survey.)	Geo-coordinates	Notes	LB Number (Note: Historic Environment Scotland assign a unique alphanumeric identifier to each designated site in Scotland, for listed buildings this always begins with "LB", for example "LB12345".)	Image
Foss Road, Chapel Stone				56°42′44″N 3°46′24″W	Category B	17694	Upload Photo
Pass Of Killiecrankie, Allt Essan				56°44′25″N 3°46′13″W	Category C(S)	17695	Upload Photo
Killiecrankie Railway Viaduct And Tunnelmouth				56°44′31″N 3°46′22″W	Category B	17698	Upload Photo
Enochdu, Kindrogan House Including Walled Garden And Ancillary Building				56°44′55″N 3°32′50″W	Category B	47629	Upload Photo
Killiecrankie, Druimuan Including Boundary Walls				56°44′47″N 3°46′45″W	Category B	47633	Upload Photo
Kirkmichael Road, Bridge Over Brerachan Water				56°45′11″N 3°37′36″W	Category B	47634	Upload Photo
Straloch School And Schoolhouse With Post Box				56°45′25″N 3°33′50″W	Category C(S)	47645	Upload Photo
Enochdu, Dirnanean, Shepherd's House Including Ancillary Building				56°45′22″N 3°31′43″W	Category C(S)	17699	Upload Photo
Tummel Garry Hydro Electric Scheme, Clunie Power Station Including Memorial Arch				56°43′01″N 3°46′41″W	Category B	47621	Upload Photo
Enochdu, Dirnanean Limekiln				56°44′53″N 3°31′55″W	Category C(S)	47626	Upload Photo
Enochdu, Dirnanean Steading, Steading House And Bothy Cottage				56°45′22″N 3°31′40″W	Category B	47627	Upload Photo
Enochdu, Kindrogan East Lodge Including Ancillary Building				56°44′45″N 3°32′22″W	Category C(S)	47628	Upload Photo
Faskally, Kennel Cottage And Kennels				56°43′36″N 3°46′17″W	Category C(S)	47630	Upload Photo
Killiecrankie, Bridge Over River Garry				56°44′38″N 3°46′51″W	Category B	47631	Upload Photo
West Bridge (Of Kindrogan) Over River Ardle				56°45′12″N 3°34′43″W	Category C(S)	47647	Upload Photo
Atholl Road, Craigeach				56°43′22″N 3°46′19″W	Category C(S)	47616	Upload Photo
Baledmund Including Private Cemetery, Boundary Walls, Gatepiers And Gates				56°43′05″N 3°43′47″W	Category B	47619	Upload Photo
West Lodge (Of Kindrogan)				56°45′11″N 3°34′41″W	Category C(S)	47648	Upload Photo
Balnakeilly House Including Garden Wall, Boundary Walls, Gatepiers And Gates				56°43′05″N 3°43′27″W	Category B	17692	Upload Photo
Atholl Road, Dalnasgadh House Including Ancillary Building, Gatepiers And Gates				56°44′56″N 3°47′28″W	Category C(S)	47617	Upload Photo
Kirkmichael Road, War Memorial				56°45′19″N 3°37′08″W	Category C(S)	47635	Upload Photo
Moulin, Wester Kinnaird, Carngeal With Ancillary Building, And Including Gatepiers And Boundary Walls Extending Around Carncroft				56°42′44″N 3°42′42″W	Category B	47638	Upload Photo
Straloch, Letty Cottage Limekiln				56°45′26″N 3°33′52″W	Category C(S)	47644	Upload Photo
Baledmund, Lodge House				56°43′02″N 3°43′38″W	Category C(S)	47620	Upload Photo
Davan Farmhouse				56°45′14″N 3°34′21″W	Category C(S)	47623	Upload Photo
Edradour Distillery Including Gatepiers And Railings				56°42′06″N 3°42′03″W	Category B	47625	Upload another image
Old Faskally Cottage				56°44′45″N 3°46′13″W	Category C(S)	47639	Upload Photo
Old Faskally Farm				56°44′52″N 3°46′06″W	Category C(S)	47640	Upload Photo
Straloch House				56°45′31″N 3°34′39″W	Category B	47643	Upload Photo
Straloch, Talla-Shee, Former Straloch Church Of Scotland				56°45′25″N 3°33′43″W	Category B	17696	Upload Photo
Atholl Road, Tigh-Na-Geat Including Ancillary Buildings				56°43′33″N 3°46′29″W	Category C(S)	47618	Upload Photo
Old Faskally House And Gatepiers				56°44′48″N 3°46′15″W	Category C(S)	47641	Upload Photo
Urrard House Including Walled Garden With Ancillary Building And Gate				56°44′58″N 3°47′14″W	Category B	47646	Upload Photo
Straloch Bridge Over Allt Fearnach				56°45′25″N 3°33′18″W	Category C(S)	19818	Upload Photo
Faskally House Including Gatepiers				56°43′07″N 3°46′14″W	Category B	17693	Upload Photo
Enochdu, Kindrogan Bridge Over River Ardle				56°44′42″N 3°32′09″W	Category C(S)	17697	Upload Photo
Davan, The Old Mill				56°45′14″N 3°34′22″W	Category C(S)	47624	Upload Photo
Middleton Of Fonab Steading Including Gatepiers				56°41′38″N 3°44′05″W	Category B	47637	Upload Photo
Orchilmore Farm, Cottage				56°45′06″N 3°46′27″W	Category B	47642	Upload Photo
Tummel Garry Hydro Electric Scheme, Clunie Dam				56°43′15″N 3°49′29″W	Category B	51713	Upload Photo
Coronation Bridge				56°43′13″N 3°47′38″W	Category C(S)	47622	Upload Photo
Middleton Of Fonab Farmhouse Including Ancillary Building				56°41′39″N 3°44′03″W	Category C(S)	47636	Upload Photo

== Key ==
The scheme for classifying buildings in Scotland is:

- Category A: "buildings of national or international importance, either architectural or historic; or fine, little-altered examples of some particular period, style or building type."
- Category B: "buildings of regional or more than local importance; or major examples of some particular period, style or building type, which may have been altered."
- Category C: "buildings of local importance; lesser examples of any period, style, or building type, as originally constructed or moderately altered; and simple traditional buildings which group well with other listed buildings."

In March 2016 there were 47,288 listed buildings in Scotland. Of these, 8% were Category A, and 50% were Category B, with the remaining 42% being Category C.
