= List of listed buildings in Kettins, Perth and Kinross =

This is a list of listed buildings in the parish of Kettins in Perth and Kinross, Scotland.

== List ==
Name	Location	Date listed	Geo-coordinates	Notes	Category	LB number	Image
Kettins Parish Kirk			56°32′14″N 3°14′27″W		B	11443	Upload another image
Hallyburton Estate, Baldinny Farmhouse			56°31′45″N 3°14′03″W		C(S)	51602	Upload Photo
Lintrose House - Doocot			56°31′38″N 3°15′44″W		B	11404	Upload Photo
Parish Kirk - Cross			56°32′14″N 3°14′26″W		B	11445	Upload Photo
Hallyburton Estate, Stables And Ancillary Building			56°32′04″N 3°13′24″W		B	51606	Upload Photo
Parish Kirk - Belfry			56°32′14″N 3°14′27″W		B	11444	Upload Photo
Hallyburton Estate, Walled Garden, Store And Cottages			56°31′50″N 3°13′29″W		C(S)	51608	Upload Photo
Hallyburton Estate, West Lodge, Gate And Quadrant Walls			56°31′37″N 3°14′09″W		B	51609	Upload Photo
Parish Kirk Manse			56°32′13″N 3°14′26″W		B	11401	Upload Photo
Lintrose - Sawmill. Bridge Over Kinnochtry Burn			56°31′29″N 3°15′48″W		B	11406	Upload Photo
Lintrose - Sawmill			56°31′28″N 3°15′48″W		B	11405	Upload Photo
Keilor House - Doocot			56°32′54″N 3°11′30″W		B	11411	Upload Photo
Hallyburton Estate, Garage And Game Larders			56°32′02″N 3°13′27″W		C(S)	51603	Upload Photo
Newton Of Ballunie			56°32′24″N 3°12′41″W		B	13752	Upload Photo
Beechwood			56°32′12″N 3°14′55″W		B	11403	Upload Photo
Peattie Mill Bridge			56°31′01″N 3°15′34″W		C(S)	11407	Upload Photo
Parish Kirkyard - Lych Gate			56°32′14″N 3°14′27″W		C(S)	11400	Upload Photo
Kettins Bridge Over Kettins Burn			56°32′16″N 3°14′21″W		B	11402	Upload Photo
Pitcur Castle			56°31′08″N 3°13′05″W		B	11408	Upload another image
Pitcur Earth House			56°31′21″N 3°12′57″W		B	11409	Upload Photo
Baldowrie Symbol Stone			56°32′39″N 3°11′00″W		B	11410	Upload another image
Hallyburton Estate, Sundial			56°32′00″N 3°13′28″W		A	51607	Upload Photo
Parish Kirkyard - Sculptured Stone			56°32′15″N 3°14′27″W		B	13758	Upload Photo
Kirkyard Walls			56°32′14″N 3°14′27″W		B	11399	Upload Photo
Hallyburton Estate, Ha-Ha To Nw And Se Of Hallyburton House And To Main Driveway			56°31′58″N 3°13′24″W		B	51604	Upload Photo
Hallyburton Estate, Hallyburton House, Formal Garden, Terracing And Lorimer Gate			56°32′01″N 3°13′28″W		A	51605	Upload Photo

== Key ==
The scheme for classifying buildings in Scotland is:

- Category A: "buildings of national or international importance, either architectural or historic; or fine, little-altered examples of some particular period, style or building type."
- Category B: "buildings of regional or more than local importance; or major examples of some particular period, style or building type, which may have been altered."
- Category C: "buildings of local importance; lesser examples of any period, style, or building type, as originally constructed or moderately altered; and simple traditional buildings which group well with other listed buildings."

In March 2016 there were 47,288 listed buildings in Scotland. Of these, 8% were Category A, and 50% were Category B, with the remaining 42% being Category C.
