= List of listed buildings in Bendochy, Perth and Kinross =

This is a list of listed buildings in the parish of Bendochy in Perth and Kinross, Scotland.

== List ==
Name	Location	Date listed	Geo-coordinates	Notes	Category	LB number	Image
Coupar Grange Gardens			56°34′07″N 3°15′34″W		C(S)	5493	Upload Photo
Mudhall, Farmhouse (Now Two Dwellings)			56°33′53″N 3°15′50″W		C(S)	5491	Upload Photo
Bendochy Parish Church			56°33′31″N 3°16′24″W		B	5486	Upload Photo
Bendochy War Memorial Lych-Gate			56°33′31″N 3°16′25″W		C(S)	5487	Upload Photo
Polcalk, Farmhouse			56°36′11″N 3°15′06″W		B	5496	Upload Photo
Bendochy Parish Church Graveyard			56°33′30″N 3°16′24″W		C(S)	5488	Upload Photo
Coupar Grange House And Garden			56°34′11″N 3°15′18″W		B	5492	Upload Photo
Grange Of Aberbothrie, Farmhouse			56°35′10″N 3°14′38″W		C(S)	5495	Upload Photo
Bendochy Manse			56°33′34″N 3°16′24″W		C(S)	5489	Upload Photo
Bendochy Manse Garden, Old Bellcote			56°33′32″N 3°16′24″W		B	5490	Upload Photo
Polcalk Threshing Mill			56°36′11″N 3°15′05″W		B	5498	Upload Photo
Polcalk Doocot			56°36′11″N 3°15′06″W		B	5497	Upload Photo
Coupar Grange, Model Cottages, Easter And Wester			56°34′29″N 3°15′48″W		B	5494	Upload Photo

== Key ==
The scheme for classifying buildings in Scotland is:

- Category A: "buildings of national or international importance, either architectural or historic; or fine, little-altered examples of some particular period, style or building type."
- Category B: "buildings of regional or more than local importance; or major examples of some particular period, style or building type, which may have been altered."
- Category C: "buildings of local importance; lesser examples of any period, style, or building type, as originally constructed or moderately altered; and simple traditional buildings which group well with other listed buildings."

In March 2016 there were 47,288 listed buildings in Scotland. Of these, 8% were Category A, and 50% were Category B, with the remaining 42% being Category C.
