= List of listed buildings in Moneydie, Perth and Kinross =

This is a list of listed buildings in the parish of Moneydie in Perth and Kinross, Scotland.

== List ==
| Name | Location | Date Listed | Grid Ref. (Note: Sometimes known as OSGB36, the grid reference (where provided) is based on the British national grid reference system used by the Ordnance Survey. • "Guide to National Grid". Ordnance Survey. • "Get-a-map". Ordnance Survey.) | Geo-coordinates | Notes | LB Number (Note: Historic Environment Scotland assign a unique alphanumeric identifier to each designated site in Scotland, for listed buildings this always begins with "LB", for example "LB12345".) | Image |
|---|---|---|---|---|---|---|---|
| Whitehill Farmhouse | | | | 56°27′56″N 3°32′32″W | Category B | 17840 | Upload Photo |
| Manse Of Moneydie | | | | 56°26′58″N 3°31′01″W | Category B | 17838 | Upload Photo |
| Millhole | | | | 56°27′27″N 3°33′10″W | Category C(S) | 19833 | Upload Photo |
| Moneydie Parish Church And Churchyard | | | | 56°26′59″N 3°31′05″W | Category B | 17837 | Upload Photo |
| Manse Of Moneydie, Sundial | | | | 56°26′58″N 3°31′01″W | Category B | 17839 | Upload Photo |
| Blackpark Lodge | | | | 56°27′11″N 3°32′39″W | Category B | 17841 | Upload Photo |

== Key ==
The scheme for classifying buildings in Scotland is:

- Category A: "buildings of national or international importance, either architectural or historic; or fine, little-altered examples of some particular period, style or building type."
- Category B: "buildings of regional or more than local importance; or major examples of some particular period, style or building type, which may have been altered."
- Category C: "buildings of local importance; lesser examples of any period, style, or building type, as originally constructed or moderately altered; and simple traditional buildings which group well with other listed buildings."

In March 2016 there were 47,288 listed buildings in Scotland. Of these, 8% were Category A, and 50% were Category B, with the remaining 42% being Category C.
