= List of listed buildings in St Martins, Perth and Kinross =

This is a list of listed buildings in the parish of St Martins in Perth and Kinross, Scotland.

== List ==
Name	Location	Date Listed	Grid Ref. (Note: Sometimes known as OSGB36, the grid reference (where provided) is based on the British national grid reference system used by the Ordnance Survey. • "Guide to National Grid". Ordnance Survey. • "Get-a-map". Ordnance Survey.)	Geo-coordinates	Notes	LB Number (Note: Historic Environment Scotland assign a unique alphanumeric identifier to each designated site in Scotland, for listed buildings this always begins with "LB", for example "LB12345".)	Image
St. Martin's Abbey Walled Garden				56°27′30″N 3°21′45″W	Category C(S)	17986	Upload Photo
St. Martin's Parish Church				56°27′28″N 3°22′24″W	Category B	19850	Upload another image
St. Martin's Churchyard				56°27′28″N 3°22′24″W	Category B	18019	Upload another image
St. Martin's Abbey Stableblock				56°27′29″N 3°21′59″W	Category B	17984	Upload Photo
St. Martin's Abbey, Lodge & Gates				56°27′10″N 3°22′00″W	Category B	17988	Upload Photo
Cambusmichael Church				56°28′37″N 3°26′14″W	Category B	17995	Upload Photo
Cambusmichael Church, Graveyard				56°28′37″N 3°26′14″W	Category B	19149	Upload Photo
Kirkstyle Of St. Martin's				56°27′30″N 3°22′23″W	Category C(S)	18020	Upload Photo
Newmiln House Gatepiers To S.W				56°27′28″N 3°25′03″W	Category C(S)	17991	Upload Photo
Bridge Of St. Martin's Burn				56°27′31″N 3°22′20″W	Category C(S)	17981	Upload another image
Roslyn Guildtown				56°28′18″N 3°24′26″W	Category C(S)	17994	Upload Photo
Burnside				56°27′32″N 3°22′19″W	Category B	17982	Upload Photo
St. Martin's Abbey (Or House)				56°27′22″N 3°21′53″W	Category B	17983	Upload Photo
Brownie's Cottage St. Martin's Abbey				56°27′29″N 3°21′55″W	Category C(S)	17985	Upload Photo
St. Martin's Abbey, Obelisk, Dove Craig				56°27′36″N 3°22′06″W	Category B	17987	Upload Photo
Blindwells Farmhouse				56°27′50″N 3°25′43″W	Category B	17992	Upload Photo
Craigmakerran				56°28′28″N 3°23′47″W	Category B	17993	Upload Photo
St. Martin's Smithy				56°27′31″N 3°22′24″W	Category C(S)	18021	Upload Photo
Newmiln House				56°27′29″N 3°25′01″W	Category B	17990	Upload Photo

== Key ==
The scheme for classifying buildings in Scotland is:

- Category A: "buildings of national or international importance, either architectural or historic; or fine, little-altered examples of some particular period, style or building type."
- Category B: "buildings of regional or more than local importance; or major examples of some particular period, style or building type, which may have been altered."
- Category C: "buildings of local importance; lesser examples of any period, style, or building type, as originally constructed or moderately altered; and simple traditional buildings which group well with other listed buildings."

In March 2016 there were 47,288 listed buildings in Scotland. Of these, 8% were Category A, and 50% were Category B, with the remaining 42% being Category C.
