= List of listed buildings in Rhynd, Perth and Kinross =

This is a list of listed buildings in the parish of Rhynd in Perth and Kinross, Scotland.

== List ==
Name	Location	Date listed	Grid ref. (Note: Sometimes known as OSGB36, the grid reference (where provided) is based on the British national grid reference system used by the Ordnance Survey. • "Guide to National Grid". Ordnance Survey. • "Get-a-map". Ordnance Survey.)	Geo-coordinates	Notes	LB number (Note: Historic Environment Scotland assign a unique alphanumeric identifier to each designated site in Scotland, for listed buildings this always begins with "LB", for example "LB12345".)	Image
Rhynd Village, K3 Telephone Kiosk				56°21′55″N 3°21′51″W	Category A	17718	Upload Photo
Rhynd Parish Church				56°22′05″N 3°22′02″W	Category B	19819	Upload Photo
Elcho Castle, Custodian's House				56°22′28″N 3°21′16″W	Category C(S)	17713	Upload Photo
Elcho Castle				56°22′29″N 3°21′16″W	Category A	17712	Upload Photo
Elcho Steading (Original Buildings Only)				56°22′22″N 3°21′23″W	Category B	17715	Upload Photo
Joug Stone, Wester Rhynd				56°21′00″N 3°20′29″W	Category B	17717	Upload Photo
Elcho Castle, Doo'Cot				56°22′23″N 3°21′23″W	Category A	17714	Upload Photo
Old Parish Church Of Rhynd And Churchyard				56°21′08″N 3°19′27″W	Category B	19820	Upload Photo
Elcho Farmhouse				56°22′20″N 3°21′25″W	Category C(S)	17716	Upload Photo

== Key ==
The scheme for classifying buildings in Scotland is:

- Category A: "buildings of national or international importance, either architectural or historic; or fine, little-altered examples of some particular period, style or building type."
- Category B: "buildings of regional or more than local importance; or major examples of some particular period, style or building type, which may have been altered."
- Category C: "buildings of local importance; lesser examples of any period, style, or building type, as originally constructed or moderately altered; and simple traditional buildings which group well with other listed buildings."

In March 2016 there were 47,288 listed buildings in Scotland. Of these, 8% were Category A, and 50% were Category B, with the remaining 42% being Category C.
