= List of listed buildings in Monzievaird And Strowan, Perth and Kinross =

This is a list of listed buildings in the parish of Monzievaird And Strowan in Perth and Kinross, Scotland.

== List ==
Name	Location	Date Listed	Grid Ref. (Note: Sometimes known as OSGB36, the grid reference (where provided) is based on the British national grid reference system used by the Ordnance Survey. • "Guide to National Grid". Ordnance Survey. • "Get-a-map". Ordnance Survey.)	Geo-coordinates	Notes	LB Number (Note: Historic Environment Scotland assign a unique alphanumeric identifier to each designated site in Scotland, for listed buildings this always begins with "LB", for example "LB12345".)	Image
Granite Lodge, Ochtertyre				56°23′08″N 3°51′44″W	Category B	18143	Upload Photo
The Milton				56°22′49″N 3°58′26″W	Category B	18156	Upload Photo
Lochlane Walled Garden				56°22′12″N 3°53′22″W	Category B	18150	Upload Photo
Monzievaird & Strowan Manse				56°22′47″N 3°55′05″W	Category B	18169	Upload Photo
Lawers Icehouse				56°22′57″N 3°57′14″W	Category C(S)	18153	Upload Photo
Ochtertyre West Icehouse				56°23′21″N 3°52′49″W	Category B	18173	Upload Photo
Lawers West Lodge (Now Caravan Site)				56°22′46″N 3°58′08″W	Category C(S)	18155	Upload Photo
Castle Cluggy, Dry Isle, Loch Monzievaird, Ochtertyre				56°23′19″N 3°52′51″W	Category B	18174	Upload Photo
Church Of Strowan Churchyard				56°22′06″N 3°54′40″W	Category C(S)	18147	Upload Photo
Sir David Baird's Monument, Tom A' Chaisteil				56°22′23″N 3°54′16″W	Category B	18148	Upload Photo
Clathick House				56°22′56″N 3°55′50″W	Category B	18151	Upload Photo
Coneyhill Near Comrie				56°22′41″N 3°59′03″W	Category B	18157	Upload Photo
Ochtertyre House Stables				56°23′27″N 3°53′05″W	Category B	18171	Upload Photo
Ochtertyre Graveyard				56°23′21″N 3°51′49″W	Category B	18177	Upload Photo
Locherlour Steading				56°23′02″N 3°54′21″W	Category B	18144	Upload Photo
Lawers House (Now School Of Agriculture)				56°23′03″N 3°56′47″W	Category A	18152	Upload another image
Auchnafree House				56°28′49″N 3°55′05″W	Category B	18158	Upload Photo
Ochtertyre Walled Garden				56°23′22″N 3°53′26″W	Category C(S)	18172	Upload Photo
Lochlane House				56°22′12″N 3°53′20″W	Category A	18149	Upload Photo
Ochtertyre Mausoleum On Site Of Church Of Monzievaird				56°23′22″N 3°51′50″W	Category B	18176	Upload Photo
Mid Lodge, Between Ochtertyre House And Mausoleum				56°23′30″N 3°52′21″W	Category B	19856	Upload Photo
Church Of Strowan				56°22′06″N 3°54′40″W	Category B	18146	Upload Photo
Lawers Walled Garden				56°23′02″N 3°57′16″W	Category B	18154	Upload Photo
Ochtertyre House				56°23′26″N 3°52′57″W	Category A	18170	Upload Photo
Middlethird Lodge, Ochtertyre				56°23′05″N 3°53′27″W	Category B	18175	Upload Photo

== Key ==
The scheme for classifying buildings in Scotland is:

- Category A: "buildings of national or international importance, either architectural or historic; or fine, little-altered examples of some particular period, style or building type."
- Category B: "buildings of regional or more than local importance; or major examples of some particular period, style or building type, which may have been altered."
- Category C: "buildings of local importance; lesser examples of any period, style, or building type, as originally constructed or moderately altered; and simple traditional buildings which group well with other listed buildings."

In March 2016 there were 47,288 listed buildings in Scotland. Of these, 8% were Category A, and 50% were Category B, with the remaining 42% being Category C.
