= List of listed buildings in Portmoak, Perth and Kinross =

This is a list of listed buildings in the parish of Portmoak in Perth and Kinross, Scotland.

== List ==
Name	Location	Date Listed	Grid Ref. (Note: Sometimes known as OSGB36, the grid reference (where provided) is based on the British national grid reference system used by the Ordnance Survey. • "Guide to National Grid". Ordnance Survey. • "Get-a-map". Ordnance Survey.)	Geo-coordinates	Notes	LB Number (Note: Historic Environment Scotland assign a unique alphanumeric identifier to each designated site in Scotland, for listed buildings this always begins with "LB", for example "LB12345".)	Image
Rowan Cottage And Adjoining House, The Cobbles				56°12′45″N 3°19′50″W	Category C(S)	19847	Upload Photo
Wester Balgedie, Ashtrees And Former Weavers Cottages				56°13′21″N 3°20′48″W	Category C(S)	19055	Upload Photo
Greenside Arnot				56°11′59″N 3°17′13″W	Category B	17955	Upload Photo
New Gullet Bridge New Cut Of River Leven				56°11′01″N 3°19′02″W	Category B	17960	Upload Photo
Michael Bruce's Birthplace The Cobbles				56°12′47″N 3°19′47″W	Category B	17963	Upload Photo
'south View' To Old Post Office Lochgelly Road				56°12′02″N 3°18′53″W	Category C(S)	17950	Upload Photo
Cottages W. Of "Clunes" Leslie Road				56°12′01″N 3°18′43″W	Category C(S)	17954	Upload Photo
Kinnesswood, The Cobbles, Millhouse Cottage Including Boundary Walls				56°12′47″N 3°19′46″W	Category C(S)	17964	Upload Photo
Portmoak Parish Kirk				56°12′11″N 3°19′05″W	Category B	17976	Upload another image See more images
Scotlandwell, Well Road, The Wash House, Including Boundary Walls				56°12′01″N 3°18′56″W	Category C(S)	46338	Upload another image See more images
Main Street, Kinaskit, Shalom And Post Office				56°12′43″N 3°19′49″W	Category C(S)	18470	Upload Photo
'Apple Grove' Well Road				56°12′02″N 3°18′55″W	Category C(S)	17948	Upload Photo
Arnot Mill				56°11′49″N 3°15′44″W	Category B	17957	Upload Photo
Arnot Mill House				56°11′48″N 3°15′44″W	Category B	17958	Upload Photo
"Dunhoy" Main Street				56°12′42″N 3°19′50″W	Category C(S)	17962	Upload Photo
St. Serfs' Priory Church St. Serf's Island Loch Leven				56°11′15″N 3°21′09″W	Category B	17966	Upload Photo
House On Loch Gelly Road (Marshall's)				56°12′03″N 3°18′55″W	Category C(S)	19846	Upload Photo
House On W. Side Of The Square				56°12′02″N 3°18′53″W	Category C(S)	17949	Upload Photo
House On Loch Gelly Road (Duncan's)				56°12′03″N 3°18′55″W	Category C(S)	17951	Upload Photo
Loch Leven Tavern Loch Gelly Road				56°12′02″N 3°18′52″W	Category C(S)	17952	Upload another image See more images
Kinnesswood, Main Street, Roselea East				56°12′44″N 3°19′51″W	Category B	17967	Upload Photo
Kinnesswood Main Street, Roselea West				56°12′44″N 3°19′52″W	Category B	17968	Upload Photo
Registrar's House Main Street				56°12′43″N 3°19′51″W	Category C(S)	17961	Upload Photo
Kinnesswood, Main Street, Loch Leven View				56°12′45″N 3°19′52″W	Category C(S)	17969	Upload Photo
Portmoak Parish Manse				56°12′11″N 3°19′10″W	Category C(S)	17978	Upload Photo
Climpy Cottage And Chapel House Leslie Road				56°12′00″N 3°18′46″W	Category C(S)	17953	Upload Photo
Arnot Tower				56°12′03″N 3°16′53″W	Category B	17956	Upload Photo
Easter Balgedie Farmhouse				56°13′01″N 3°20′20″W	Category C(S)	17965	Upload Photo
Old West Brackly Farmhouse				56°10′07″N 3°23′10″W	Category C(S)	17959	Upload Photo
Michael Bruce Memorial Portmoak Kirkyard				56°12′11″N 3°19′06″W	Category B	17977	Upload Photo
Scotland Well, Well Road, Well				56°12′02″N 3°18′56″W	Category B	17979	Upload Photo
Well Cottages Well Road				56°12′02″N 3°18′54″W	Category C(S)	17980	Upload Photo

== Key ==
The scheme for classifying buildings in Scotland is:

- Category A: "buildings of national or international importance, either architectural or historic; or fine, little-altered examples of some particular period, style or building type."
- Category B: "buildings of regional or more than local importance; or major examples of some particular period, style or building type, which may have been altered."
- Category C: "buildings of local importance; lesser examples of any period, style, or building type, as originally constructed or moderately altered; and simple traditional buildings which group well with other listed buildings."

In March 2016 there were 47,288 listed buildings in Scotland. Of these, 8% were Category A, and 50% were Category B, with the remaining 42% being Category C.
