= List of listed buildings in Redgorton, Perth and Kinross =

This is a list of listed buildings in the parish of Redgorton in Perth and Kinross, Scotland.

== List ==
Name	Location	Date Listed	Grid Ref. (Note: Sometimes known as OSGB36, the grid reference (where provided) is based on the British national grid reference system used by the Ordnance Survey. • "Guide to National Grid". Ordnance Survey. • "Get-a-map". Ordnance Survey.)	Geo-coordinates	Notes	LB Number (Note: Historic Environment Scotland assign a unique alphanumeric identifier to each designated site in Scotland, for listed buildings this always begins with "LB", for example "LB12345".)	Image
Former Secession (Latterly U.P.) Church, Now Church Hall, Bridgeton				56°25′10″N 3°30′55″W	Category B	17911	Upload Photo
Cromwellpark House				56°25′27″N 3°31′39″W	Category C(S)	17917	Upload Photo
Belvedere House				56°26′13″N 3°28′22″W	Category B	17904	Upload Photo
East End, Pitcairngreen				56°25′37″N 3°30′52″W	Category C(S)	17907	Upload Photo
Pitcairngreen Inn				56°25′32″N 3°31′04″W	Category B	17909	Upload Photo
5, 7, Bridgeton				56°25′11″N 3°30′58″W	Category C(S)	17913	Upload Photo
M. Mullen Bridge House Pitcairnfield				56°24′57″N 3°30′44″W	Category B	17918	Upload Photo
Stanley, Perth Road, War Memorial Including Boundary Walls, Gatepiers, Gates And Railings				56°28′52″N 3°27′01″W	Category C(S)	48627	Upload Photo
Pitcairn Cottage Nr. Pitcairngreen				56°25′46″N 3°31′26″W	Category C(S)	17906	Upload Photo
2-8 (Even Nos.) Bridgeton				56°25′12″N 3°31′00″W	Category C(S)	17910	Upload Photo
11 Bridgeton				56°25′11″N 3°30′58″W	Category C(S)	17915	Upload Photo
Dry Bridge				56°26′16″N 3°32′13″W	Category A	17921	Upload Photo
Luncarty, Marshall Way, Luncarty Home Farm Steading Including Horse Mill And Boundary Wall				56°26′55″N 3°27′53″W	Category C(S)	19487	Upload Photo
Battleby House				56°26′44″N 3°29′06″W	Category B	17905	Upload Photo
St. Serf's Church, (Former U.F. Church Replacing Bridgeton U.P. And Pitcairngreen Free Following The Union Of 1900), Bridgeton				56°25′13″N 3°31′02″W	Category B	17916	Upload Photo
Cromwellpark Cottage, Formerly West Cromwellpark House				56°25′33″N 3°32′12″W	Category B	17919	Upload Photo
Stanley, Perth Road, St Columba's Episcopal Church				56°28′51″N 3°27′01″W	Category C(S)	48626	Upload Photo
Almond Bridge, On A9 Over River Almond				56°25′21″N 3°28′08″W	Category B	17903	Upload Photo
St. Serf's Manse, (Originally Free Church Manse) Pitcairngreen				56°25′34″N 3°31′10″W	Category C(S)	17908	Upload Photo
9 And 13 Bridgeton Brae				56°25′12″N 3°30′57″W	Category C(S)	17914	Upload Photo
Craig House				56°26′03″N 3°32′57″W	Category C(S)	17920	Upload Photo
Over Benchil, Standing Stone With Sundial				56°28′25″N 3°28′13″W	Category B	17924	Upload Photo
Stanley Parish Church				56°28′47″N 3°26′46″W	Category B	17925	Upload Photo
Churchyard				56°26′20″N 3°29′16″W	Category C(S)	17902	Upload Photo
1, 3, Bridgeton				56°25′11″N 3°30′57″W	Category C(S)	17912	Upload Photo
Luncarty House (Main Block Only)				56°26′59″N 3°27′55″W	Category C(S)	17922	Upload Photo
Luncarty Post Office, Downhill				56°27′25″N 3°28′19″W	Category C(S)	17923	Upload Photo
Craig House Duchess Street Stanley				56°28′44″N 3°27′09″W	Category C(S)	17926	Upload Photo
Parish Church				56°26′20″N 3°29′16″W	Category B	17901	Upload Photo
The Lindens Duchess Street Stanley				56°28′46″N 3°27′09″W	Category C(S)	17927	Upload Photo

== Key ==
The scheme for classifying buildings in Scotland is:

- Category A: "buildings of national or international importance, either architectural or historic; or fine, little-altered examples of some particular period, style or building type."
- Category B: "buildings of regional or more than local importance; or major examples of some particular period, style or building type, which may have been altered."
- Category C: "buildings of local importance; lesser examples of any period, style, or building type, as originally constructed or moderately altered; and simple traditional buildings which group well with other listed buildings."

In March 2016 there were 47,288 listed buildings in Scotland. Of these, 8% were Category A, and 50% were Category B, with the remaining 42% being Category C.
