= List of listed buildings in Findo Gask, Perth and Kinross =

This is a list of listed buildings in the parish of Findo Gask in Perth and Kinross, Scotland.

== List ==
Name	Location	Date Listed	Grid Ref. (Note: Sometimes known as OSGB36, the grid reference (where provided) is based on the British national grid reference system used by the Ordnance Survey. • "Guide to National Grid". Ordnance Survey. • "Get-a-map". Ordnance Survey.)	Geo-coordinates	Notes	LB Number (Note: Historic Environment Scotland assign a unique alphanumeric identifier to each designated site in Scotland, for listed buildings this always begins with "LB", for example "LB12345".)	Image
Gask House				56°21′06″N 3°37′39″W	Category B	11207	Upload Photo
Gask House Walled Garden And Gardens Cottage				56°20′58″N 3°37′42″W	Category B	11210	Upload Photo
Chapelbank Farmhouse				56°20′32″N 3°36′35″W	Category C(S)	11212	Upload Photo
Manse Of Findo Gask				56°21′44″N 3°37′07″W	Category B	13740	Upload Photo
Gask North Gates. (Excluding Lodge)				56°21′22″N 3°37′30″W	Category B	11206	Upload Photo
Churchyard Of Findo Gask				56°21′48″N 3°36′59″W	Category C(S)	11205	Upload Photo
Gask Chapel				56°20′59″N 3°37′37″W	Category B	11209	Upload Photo
Dalreoch Bridge Over River Earn				56°20′34″N 3°36′47″W	Category A	11211	Upload Photo
Findo Gask Airfield, Clathymore, (Former) Control Tower				56°22′28″N 3°36′09″W	Category C(S)	48584	Upload Photo
Old Gask Churchyard				56°21′48″N 3°36′59″W	Category B	13741	Upload Photo
Old House Of Gask				56°21′03″N 3°37′41″W	Category B	11208	Upload Photo
Parish Church Of Findo-Gask				56°21′48″N 3°36′59″W	Category B	11204	Upload Photo

== Key ==
The scheme for classifying buildings in Scotland is:

- Category A: "buildings of national or international importance, either architectural or historic; or fine, little-altered examples of some particular period, style or building type."
- Category B: "buildings of regional or more than local importance; or major examples of some particular period, style or building type, which may have been altered."
- Category C: "buildings of local importance; lesser examples of any period, style, or building type, as originally constructed or moderately altered; and simple traditional buildings which group well with other listed buildings."

In March 2016 there were 47,288 listed buildings in Scotland. Of these, 8% were Category A, and 50% were Category B, with the remaining 42% being Category C.
