= List of listed buildings in Rattray, Perth and Kinross =

This is a list of listed buildings in the parish of Rattray in Perth and Kinross, Scotland.

== List ==
Name	Location	Date listed	Grid ref. (Note: Sometimes known as OSGB36, the grid reference (where provided) is based on the British national grid reference system used by the Ordnance Survey. • "Guide to National Grid". Ordnance Survey. • "Get-a-map". Ordnance Survey.)	Geo-coordinates	Notes	LB number (Note: Historic Environment Scotland assign a unique alphanumeric identifier to each designated site in Scotland, for listed buildings this always begins with "LB", for example "LB12345".)	Image
Haugh Of Drimmie Suspension Bridge Over River Ericht, Glenericht Lodge Drive				56°38′11″N 3°21′17″W	Category A	19830	Upload Photo
North Littleton				56°35′51″N 3°18′36″W	Category B	17786	Upload Photo
Craighall - Rattray				56°37′05″N 3°20′45″W	Category B	17814	Upload Photo
Rattray, Laird's House, Old Mains Of Rattray				56°35′33″N 3°17′37″W	Category B	17787	Upload Photo
Mains Of Rattray, Farmhouse				56°35′30″N 3°17′04″W	Category B	17788	Upload Photo
Ashgrove Works				56°35′17″N 3°19′02″W	Category B	17789	Upload Photo
Lodge At Suspension Bridge, Haugh Of Drimmie, Glenericht Lodge Drive				56°38′11″N 3°21′15″W	Category B	17813	Upload Photo

== Key ==
The scheme for classifying buildings in Scotland is:

- Category A: "buildings of national or international importance, either architectural or historic; or fine, little-altered examples of some particular period, style or building type."
- Category B: "buildings of regional or more than local importance; or major examples of some particular period, style or building type, which may have been altered."
- Category C: "buildings of local importance; lesser examples of any period, style, or building type, as originally constructed or moderately altered; and simple traditional buildings which group well with other listed buildings."

In March 2016 there were 47,288 listed buildings in Scotland. Of these, 8% were Category A, and 50% were Category B, with the remaining 42% being Category C.
