= List of listed buildings in Cargill, Perth and Kinross =

This is a list of listed buildings in the parish of Cargill in Perth and Kinross, Scotland.

== List ==
Name	Location	Date listed	Grid ref. (Note: Sometimes known as OSGB36, the grid reference (where provided) is based on the British national grid reference system used by the Ordnance Survey. • "Guide to National Grid". Ordnance Survey. • "Get-a-map". Ordnance Survey.)	Geo-coordinates	Notes	LB number (Note: Historic Environment Scotland assign a unique alphanumeric identifier to each designated site in Scotland, for listed buildings this always begins with "LB", for example "LB12345".)	Image
Cargill, Old Churchyard				56°31′02″N 3°22′59″W	Category C(S)	5468	Upload Photo
Cargill Manse, Sundial				56°30′56″N 3°23′04″W	Category C(S)	5471	Upload Photo
Balholmie House				56°30′38″N 3°23′11″W	Category C(S)	5476	Upload Photo
Stobhall New Library				56°29′35″N 3°24′42″W	Category A	5477	Upload Photo
Stobhall, Sundial In Formal Garden To N Of Dowery House				56°29′37″N 3°24′40″W	Category A	5479	Upload Photo
Stobhall, Sundial In Octagonal Garden To Ne Of Dowery House				56°29′40″N 3°24′38″W	Category A	79	Upload Photo
Brunty Mill Bridge Over Coupar Burn				56°31′44″N 3°18′25″W	Category B	5449	Upload Photo
Bridge On A 94 Over Coupar Burn, Near Damhead, Woodside				56°31′47″N 3°17′25″W	Category C(S)	5452	Upload Photo
Cargill, Monument To Thomsons And Macgregors Of Wolfhill And Newbigging, In Old Churchyard				56°31′02″N 3°22′59″W	Category B	5469	Upload Photo
Stobhall Old Bridge				56°29′39″N 3°24′37″W	Category C(S)	5481	Upload Photo
Cargill Church				56°31′00″N 3°22′53″W	Category B	5467	Upload Photo
Balholmie, Sundial In Garden Of				56°30′40″N 3°23′11″W	Category B	5472	Upload Photo
Burrelton, Stevenson's Building, High Street				56°31′09″N 3°18′05″W	Category C(S)	5451	Upload Photo
Cargill, Wright Vault In Cargill Old Churchyard				56°31′02″N 3°22′59″W	Category C(S)	5470	Upload Photo
Stobhall, Chapel Block				56°29′36″N 3°24′41″W	Category A	5473	Upload another image
Stobhall, Dowery House				56°29′36″N 3°24′40″W	Category A	5475	Upload another image
Stobhall, Caretaker's House And Garages				56°29′38″N 3°24′40″W	Category C(S)	5480	Upload Photo
Stobhall, Folly				56°29′41″N 3°24′38″W	Category A	43856	Upload Photo
Little Keithick Bridge Over Coupar Burn				56°31′56″N 3°18′45″W	Category C(S)	5450	Upload Photo
Stobhall, Laundry, Brewhouse And Bakehouse Block And Surrounding Walls Including Sundial To Sw				56°29′36″N 3°24′41″W	Category A	5474	Upload Photo

== Key ==
The scheme for classifying buildings in Scotland is:

- Category A: "buildings of national or international importance, either architectural or historic; or fine, little-altered examples of some particular period, style or building type."
- Category B: "buildings of regional or more than local importance; or major examples of some particular period, style or building type, which may have been altered."
- Category C: "buildings of local importance; lesser examples of any period, style, or building type, as originally constructed or moderately altered; and simple traditional buildings which group well with other listed buildings."

In March 2016 there were 47,288 listed buildings in Scotland. Of these, 8% were Category A, and 50% were Category B, with the remaining 42% being Category C.
