= List of listed buildings in Kinnaird, Perth and Kinross =

This is a list of listed buildings in the parish of Kinnaird in Perth and Kinross, Scotland.

== List ==
Name	Location	Date Listed	Grid Ref. (Note: Sometimes known as OSGB36, the grid reference (where provided) is based on the British national grid reference system used by the Ordnance Survey. • "Guide to National Grid". Ordnance Survey. • "Get-a-map". Ordnance Survey.)	Geo-coordinates	Notes	LB Number (Note: Historic Environment Scotland assign a unique alphanumeric identifier to each designated site in Scotland, for listed buildings this always begins with "LB", for example "LB12345".)	Image
Kinnaird Castle				56°26′46″N 3°13′57″W	Category A	11218	Upload Photo
Holylea (Formerly Mansfield) Former Manse Kinnaird Village				56°26′38″N 3°13′53″W	Category B	11215	Upload Photo
Kinnaird Parish Church				56°26′38″N 3°13′46″W	Category B	11213	Upload Photo
Kinnaird Parish Church, Churchyard And Session House				56°26′37″N 3°13′46″W	Category B	11214	Upload Photo
Ferndene (Formerly Manse Cottage) Kinnaird Village				56°26′39″N 3°13′50″W	Category C(S)	11216	Upload Photo
Schoolhouse, Kinnaird Village				56°26′40″N 3°13′53″W	Category C(S)	11217	Upload Photo
Westmill Farmhouse				56°26′39″N 3°13′23″W	Category B	11221	Upload Photo
Arches On Cliff Over Flawcraig Farm (The Monument)				56°26′08″N 3°14′41″W	Category B	11220	Upload Photo
Kinnaird Castle, Doocot				56°26′44″N 3°13′50″W	Category B	11219	Upload Photo

== Key ==
The scheme for classifying buildings in Scotland is:

- Category A: "buildings of national or international importance, either architectural or historic; or fine, little-altered examples of some particular period, style or building type."
- Category B: "buildings of regional or more than local importance; or major examples of some particular period, style or building type, which may have been altered."
- Category C: "buildings of local importance; lesser examples of any period, style, or building type, as originally constructed or moderately altered; and simple traditional buildings which group well with other listed buildings."

In March 2016 there were 47,288 listed buildings in Scotland. Of these, 8% were Category A, and 50% were Category B, with the remaining 42% being Category C.
