= List of listed buildings in Muthill, Perth and Kinross =

This is a list of listed buildings in the parish of Muthill in Perth and Kinross, Scotland.

== List ==
Name	Location	Date Listed	Grid Ref. (Note: Sometimes known as OSGB36, the grid reference (where provided) is based on the British national grid reference system used by the Ordnance Survey. • "Guide to National Grid". Ordnance Survey. • "Get-a-map". Ordnance Survey.)	Geo-coordinates	Notes	LB Number (Note: Historic Environment Scotland assign a unique alphanumeric identifier to each designated site in Scotland, for listed buildings this always begins with "LB", for example "LB12345".)	Image
Muthill, Drummond Street (S), A. Fotheringham				56°19′55″N 3°50′06″W	Category C(S)	18142	Upload Photo
Muthill, The Cross. House Belonging To W. Macallister				56°19′55″N 3°49′56″W	Category C(S)	18164	Upload Photo
Muthill, Drummond Street (N) Wm. Campbell's Property				56°19′56″N 3°50′01″W	Category C(S)	18168	Upload Photo
Culdees, Stables				56°19′28″N 3°47′56″W	Category B	18050	Upload Photo
Aldonie Cottage				56°18′02″N 3°51′13″W	Category B	18053	Upload Photo
Muthill, Willoughby Street (S), Drummond Castle Property J. Mcculloch And W. Haldane Tenants				56°19′43″N 3°49′48″W	Category B	18055	Upload Photo
Muthill, Willoughby Street (S), 'Ingleneuk' (Hutcheson)				56°19′44″N 3°49′51″W	Category C(S)	18061	Upload Photo
The Croft, (Rosebank Cottage On Map)				56°19′43″N 3°49′58″W	Category B	18070	Upload Photo
Drummond Castle, Keep				56°20′26″N 3°52′18″W	Category B	18078	Upload another image
Muthill, Willoughby Street (E), 'Lilyfield' (Mcilvride)				56°19′49″N 3°49′56″W	Category C(S)	18083	Upload Photo
Muthill, Willoughby Street (E), Greenfield House (Mr T. Russell)				56°19′47″N 3°49′55″W	Category C(S)	18089	Upload Photo
Muthill, Willoughby Street (N) Mcgregor				56°19′44″N 3°49′48″W	Category C(S)	18098	Upload Photo
Muthill, Drummond Street (S), 'Lea Cottage' Mr. Culloch				56°19′55″N 3°50′09″W	Category C(S)	18104	Upload Photo
Muthill, Willoughby Street (W), Former House, Now Store W. Of Post Office, The Property Of Cecil Taylor				56°19′54″N 3°49′57″W	Category C(S)	18106	Upload Photo
Muthill, Willoughby Street (E), 'sydbar' (Mrs. Mackintosh)				56°19′55″N 3°49′56″W	Category C(S)	18111	Upload Photo
Muthill, Willoughby Street (E), Tansey's Property				56°19′54″N 3°49′56″W	Category C(S)	18113	Upload Photo
Muthill, Drummond Street (N) Surgery (Drs. Penny, Wishart & Mitchell)				56°19′56″N 3°50′02″W	Category C(S)	18124	Upload Photo
Muthill, Drummond Street (S), Commercial Hotel				56°19′55″N 3°50′01″W	Category C(S)	18135	Upload Photo
Muthill, Drummond Street (S), 'Garry Cottage'				56°19′55″N 3°50′01″W	Category C(S)	18136	Upload Photo
Parkhead Farmhouse				56°20′17″N 3°46′57″W	Category C(S)	46523	Upload Photo
Underhill Farmhouse				56°19′34″N 3°50′14″W	Category B	19852	Upload Photo
Muthill, Drummond Street (S), Mrs. J. Malloch's Property				56°19′55″N 3°50′04″W	Category C(S)	18140	Upload Photo
Muthill Old Parish Churchyard				56°19′57″N 3°49′58″W	Category B	18160	Upload Photo
Muthill, The Cross, Property Belonging To Miss E. Williamson				56°19′56″N 3°49′56″W	Category C(S)	18166	Upload Photo
Muthill, Willoughby Street (S) 'Boyton'				56°19′43″N 3°49′49″W	Category C(S)	18057	Upload Photo
Muthill, Pitkellony Street, Property Occupied By Mrs. Sprunt And Mr. And Mrs Mccluskey				56°19′44″N 3°49′52″W	Category C(S)	18063	Upload Photo
Strageath Mill Farm House				56°20′42″N 3°48′37″W	Category B	18074	Upload Photo
Muthill, Willoughby Street (E), 'Newra House' (Mooney Kellog And Others)				56°19′47″N 3°49′55″W	Category C(S)	18087	Upload Photo
Muthill, Drummond Street (S),				56°19′55″N 3°50′07″W	Category C(S)	18102	Upload Photo
Muthill, Drummond Street (N) 3 Houses, Mcclelland And Miss Nish				56°19′56″N 3°50′05″W	Category C(S)	18127	Upload Photo
Muthill, The Lurg				56°18′44″N 3°50′38″W	Category C(S)	51357	Upload Photo
Muthill, Willoughby Street (W), 'Ruaig' Miss Orist				56°19′51″N 3°49′57″W	Category C(S)	19853	Upload Photo
Muthill, Drummond Street (S), D. Scobie's Property (Tenant D. Gillies)				56°19′55″N 3°49′59″W	Category C(S)	19854	Upload Photo
Muthill New Parish Church				56°19′56″N 3°49′48″W	Category B	18161	Upload another image
Muthill New Parish Church, Gates				56°19′56″N 3°49′52″W	Category C(S)	18162	Upload Photo
Muthill, Pitkellony Street, Cowan				56°19′44″N 3°49′56″W	Category C(S)	18067	Upload Photo
Bennybeg Smithy				56°20′51″N 3°50′36″W	Category B	18076	Upload Photo
Muthill, Willoughby Street (E), 'Laurel Cottage' (Mcmillan)				56°19′49″N 3°49′56″W	Category C(S)	18084	Upload Photo
Muthill, Willoughby Street (S) 'Far Hills' (Formerly 'Garthland House')				56°19′43″N 3°49′47″W	Category C(S)	18100	Upload Photo
Muthill, Drummond Street (S), Gambon Cottage D. Donaldson				56°19′55″N 3°50′08″W	Category C(S)	18103	Upload Photo
Muthill, Willoughby Street (W), 'Nethercote' And Post Office				56°19′54″N 3°49′56″W	Category C(S)	18105	Upload Photo
Muthill, Drummond Street (N) 'West End Cottage' Sweeney				56°19′56″N 3°50′09″W	Category C(S)	18131	Upload Photo
Drummond Castle, Formal Garden				56°20′22″N 3°52′15″W	Category A	19883	Upload another image
Muthill, Drummond Street (S), A. Williamson				56°19′55″N 3°50′02″W	Category C(S)	18138	Upload Photo
Muthill, Drummond Street (N) Macrae Building				56°19′56″N 3°49′58″W	Category C(S)	18167	Upload Photo
Mill Of Steps Bridge, Over Machany Water				56°18′51″N 3°50′29″W	Category B	18051	Upload Photo
Muthill, Willoughby Street (S), 'Arrascote' (Petrie)				56°19′44″N 3°49′50″W	Category C(S)	18058	Upload Photo
Muthill, Willoughby Street (S), 'Leanna' Mrs. Robertson				56°19′44″N 3°49′50″W	Category C(S)	18060	Upload Photo
Muthill, Pitkellony Street, Thomas Melville				56°19′44″N 3°49′54″W	Category C(S)	18065	Upload Photo
Muthill, Pitkellony Street, Mr. Lang				56°19′44″N 3°49′55″W	Category C(S)	18066	Upload Photo
Highlandman's Park, Rubble Retaining Wall And Dyke				56°19′44″N 3°49′57″W	Category C(S)	18069	Upload Photo
Muthill, Willoughby Street (E), 'st. Ann's' (C. Mackintosh)				56°19′51″N 3°49′56″W	Category C(S)	18080	Upload Photo
Muthill, Willoughby Street (E), 'Park House' (Mrs. Milroy)				56°19′46″N 3°49′55″W	Category C(S)	18090	Upload Photo
Muthill, Willoughby Street (N), Maccraw				56°19′45″N 3°49′51″W	Category C(S)	18096	Upload Photo
Muthill, Willoughby Street (N), 'Belmont' And 'Cottage Clare'				56°19′44″N 3°49′49″W	Category C(S)	18097	Upload Photo
Muthill, Willoughby Street (W), 'Leny House' Anderson				56°19′51″N 3°49′57″W	Category C(S)	18110	Upload Photo
Muthill, Willoughby Street (E), Whyte's Building				56°19′53″N 3°49′55″W	Category C(S)	18119	Upload Photo
Muthill, Willoughby Street (E), (Miss Ness)				56°19′52″N 3°49′55″W	Category C(S)	18120	Upload Photo
Muthill, Drummond Street (N) Property Owned By Wm. Campbell, Mcgregor Tenant				56°19′56″N 3°50′02″W	Category C(S)	18122	Upload Photo
Muthill, Drummond Street (N) Younger 'Dilwara'				56°19′56″N 3°50′03″W	Category C(S)	18125	Upload Photo
Muthill, Drummond Street, (N) Drummond Castle Property Tenanted By R. Taylor				56°19′56″N 3°50′04″W	Category C(S)	18126	Upload Photo
Muthill, Drummond Street (N) Smith, Fletcher, Boyd & Steven				56°19′56″N 3°50′08″W	Category C(S)	18130	Upload Photo
Pitkellony House, Walled Garden				56°19′47″N 3°50′16″W	Category C(S)	50899	Upload Photo
Muthill, The Cross, 'Machany Cottage'				56°19′55″N 3°49′55″W	Category C(S)	19855	Upload Photo
Thornhill, N.E. Section, Drummond Castle Policies				56°20′18″N 3°52′32″W	Category C(S)	18044	Upload Photo
Drummond Bridge Over Machany Water				56°19′14″N 3°52′51″W	Category B	18052	Upload Photo
Muthill, Pitkellony Street, 'Crossways' (Misses Mackie)				56°19′44″N 3°49′54″W	Category B	18064	Upload Photo
Muthill, Willoughby Street (E), Watson 'Parkview'				56°19′45″N 3°49′53″W	Category C(S)	18093	Upload Photo
Muthill, Willoughby Street (E.-W. Section - N.) 'Dunsinnane' (Rintoul)				56°19′45″N 3°49′52″W	Category C(S)	18095	Upload Photo
Muthill, Willoughby Street (W), 'Polythack Cottage'				56°19′53″N 3°49′57″W	Category C(S)	18107	Upload Photo
Muthill, Willoughby Street (W). Mackintosh				56°19′53″N 3°49′56″W	Category C(S)	18108	Upload Photo
Muthill, Willoughby Street (E), Property E. Of 'The Roundel' Occupied By Mcainsh Gow And Dinnie				56°19′53″N 3°49′55″W	Category C(S)	18117	Upload Photo
Muthill, Willoughby Street (E), 'The Roundel' Gow				56°19′53″N 3°49′55″W	Category B	18118	Upload Photo
Muthill, Drummond Street (N) 'Cruachan'				56°19′56″N 3°50′07″W	Category B	18129	Upload Photo
Muthill, Drummond Street, Taylor's Property				56°19′56″N 3°50′00″W	Category C(S)	18469	Upload Photo
Muthill, Drummond Street (S), 'Diamond House'				56°19′55″N 3°50′02″W	Category C(S)	18137	Upload Photo
Muthill Old Parish Church (A Ruin)				56°19′57″N 3°49′58″W	Category A	18159	Upload Photo
Muthill, The Cross 'Old Schoolhouse'				56°19′56″N 3°49′56″W	Category C(S)	18165	Upload Photo
Drummond Castle West Lodge				56°20′24″N 3°53′01″W	Category B	18045	Upload Photo
Culdees Castle				56°19′27″N 3°48′17″W	Category B	18049	Upload Photo
Muthill, Willoughby Street (S), 'Myrtle Cottage' Robertson				56°19′44″N 3°49′50″W	Category C(S)	18059	Upload Photo
Dog Head Well, Highlandman's Park, At Junction Of Pitkellony Street And Willoughby Street				56°19′44″N 3°49′54″W	Category B	18068	Upload Photo
Strageath Mill				56°20′43″N 3°48′34″W	Category C(S)	18075	Upload Photo
Muthill, Willoughby Street (E), 'struthill House' (Stalker)				56°19′47″N 3°49′55″W	Category C(S)	18088	Upload Photo
Muthill, Willoughby Street (E), 'st. John's Cottages' Haldane And Campbell				56°19′45″N 3°49′53″W	Category C(S)	18094	Upload Photo
Muthill, Drummond Street (S), Mrs. Ballantine				56°19′55″N 3°50′06″W	Category C(S)	18101	Upload Photo
Muthill, Willoughby Street (W), Masonic Lodge Property				56°19′52″N 3°49′57″W	Category C(S)	18109	Upload Photo
Muthill, Willoughby Street (E) 'Casa Manda'. Mcainsh				56°19′53″N 3°49′55″W	Category C(S)	18116	Upload Photo
Muthill, Drummond Street (S) Mrs. W. Tainsh				56°19′55″N 3°49′58″W	Category C(S)	18132	Upload Photo
Muthill, Drummond Street (S) 'st. Nicholas' (Wm. Milne)				56°19′55″N 3°49′58″W	Category C(S)	18133	Upload Photo
Dalliotfield				56°20′07″N 3°49′40″W	Category C(S)	50822	Upload Photo
Wester Ochtermuthill				56°19′44″N 3°53′44″W	Category B	19851	Upload Photo
Drummond Castle, Mansion				56°20′27″N 3°52′14″W	Category B	18042	Upload another image
Balloch Mill, Miller's House And Adjoining Buildings				56°21′09″N 3°52′29″W	Category B	18046	Upload Photo
Balloch Mill, Threshing Mill				56°21′08″N 3°52′30″W	Category C(S)	18047	Upload Photo
Balloch Mill, Former Mill Buildings				56°21′08″N 3°52′27″W	Category C(S)	18048	Upload Photo
Muthill, K6 Telephone Kiosk Close To Old Parish Church				56°19′55″N 3°49′56″W	Category B	18054	Upload Photo
Pitkellony Lodge, Thornhill House Including Dairy, Ancillary Building, Gates, Gatepiers And Boundary Walls				56°19′45″N 3°50′00″W	Category C(S)	18071	Upload Photo
Drummond Castle Gates & East Lodge				56°20′34″N 3°50′27″W	Category B	18077	Upload Photo
Muthill, Willoughby Street (E), 'Dunvegan'				56°19′52″N 3°49′55″W	Category C(S)	18079	Upload Photo
Muthill, Willoughby Street (E), 'Ivydale' Ross				56°19′50″N 3°49′56″W	Category C(S)	18081	Upload Photo
Muthill, Willoughby Street (E), Mrs. Corse				56°19′50″N 3°49′56″W	Category C(S)	18082	Upload Photo
Muthill, Willoughby Street (E), 'Gowanlea' Miss M. Tainsh				56°19′48″N 3°49′56″W	Category C(S)	18086	Upload Photo
Muthill, Willoughby Street (E), Drummond Cottage (Cameron, Drummond Cas. Property)				56°19′54″N 3°49′55″W	Category C(S)	18114	Upload Photo
Muthill, Drummond Street (N) Property Owned By Mrs. J. Gow, Mcallister, Tenant				56°19′56″N 3°50′02″W	Category C(S)	18123	Upload Photo
Muthill, Drummond Street (S) Mr Ginlay 'Hillview'				56°19′55″N 3°49′59″W	Category C(S)	18134	Upload Photo
Pitkellony House				56°19′49″N 3°50′13″W	Category C(S)	50898	Upload Photo
Muthill, Drummond Street (S), 'Drumbeg' (Owner: Cummings, Tenant: Burns)				56°19′55″N 3°50′03″W	Category C(S)	18139	Upload Photo
Muthill, Drummond Street (S), Mrs. J. Malloch				56°19′55″N 3°50′04″W	Category C(S)	18141	Upload Photo
St. James Episcopal Church, Muthill (Including Hall And Vestry)				56°19′55″N 3°49′53″W	Category B	18163	Upload Photo
Drummond Castle - Statue Said To Be Of Jupiter On Avenue S. Of Castle				56°20′14″N 3°52′11″W	Category B	18043	Upload Photo
Muthill, Willoughby Street (S), 'Dunbrae' Mrs. Westwood				56°19′43″N 3°49′48″W	Category C(S)	18056	Upload Photo
Muthill, Willoughby Street (S), 'Auchindoir' (Now Mrs Clarke) Balmora L Castle				56°19′44″N 3°49′52″W	Category C(S)	18062	Upload Photo
Underhill Steading				56°19′35″N 3°50′15″W	Category C(S)	18072	Upload Photo
Bishop's Bridge Over Machany Water				56°19′02″N 3°49′12″W	Category C(S)	18073	Upload Photo
Muthill, Willoughby Street (E), 'Parkside'				56°19′48″N 3°49′56″W	Category C(S)	18085	Upload Photo
Muthill, Willoughby Street (E), 'Little Culdees' Miss Gibson				56°19′46″N 3°49′54″W	Category B	18091	Upload Photo
Muthill, Willoughby Street (E), Drummond Castle Houses Tenanted By Mrs Mccurrach & Mrs. Birnie				56°19′45″N 3°49′54″W	Category C(S)	18092	Upload Photo
Muthill, Willoughby Street (N), 'Viewfield' (Cooper)				56°19′44″N 3°49′47″W	Category C(S)	18099	Upload Photo
Muthill, Willoughby Street (E), 'Lime Tree View'				56°19′55″N 3°49′56″W	Category C(S)	18112	Upload Photo
Muthill, Willoughby Street (E), Mcdougal Property				56°19′54″N 3°49′55″W	Category C(S)	18115	Upload Photo
Muthill, Willoughby Street (E), 'Victoria House' Miss Ellis				56°19′52″N 3°49′55″W	Category C(S)	18121	Upload Photo
Muthill, Drummond Street (N) Stratton 'sundial'				56°19′56″N 3°50′06″W	Category C(S)	18128	Upload Photo

== Key ==
The scheme for classifying buildings in Scotland is:

- Category A: "buildings of national or international importance, either architectural or historic; or fine, little-altered examples of some particular period, style or building type."
- Category B: "buildings of regional or more than local importance; or major examples of some particular period, style or building type, which may have been altered."
- Category C: "buildings of local importance; lesser examples of any period, style, or building type, as originally constructed or moderately altered; and simple traditional buildings which group well with other listed buildings."

In March 2016 there were 47,288 listed buildings in Scotland. Of these, 8% were Category A, and 50% were Category B, with the remaining 42% being Category C.
