= List of listed buildings in Forteviot, Perth and Kinross =

This is a list of listed buildings in the parish of Forteviot in Perth and Kinross, Scotland.

== List ==
Name	Location	Date listed	Grid ref. (Note: Sometimes known as OSGB36, the grid reference (where provided) is based on the British national grid reference system used by the Ordnance Survey. • "Guide to National Grid". Ordnance Survey. • "Get-a-map". Ordnance Survey.)	Geo-coordinates	Notes	LB number (Note: Historic Environment Scotland assign a unique alphanumeric identifier to each designated site in Scotland, for listed buildings this always begins with "LB", for example "LB12345".)	Image
Parish Church Of Forteviot. Session House				56°20′25″N 3°32′11″W	Category C(S)	11053	Upload Photo
Forteviot Square				56°20′27″N 3°32′08″W	Category A	11057	Upload another image
Green Of Invermay, House				56°19′48″N 3°32′11″W	Category C(S)	11064	Upload Photo
Invermay House, West Lodges And Gates				56°19′27″N 3°32′13″W	Category B	11067	Upload Photo
Invermay House, Game Larder And Ice House				56°19′41″N 3°31′11″W	Category B	11072	Upload Photo
Old House Of Invermay				56°19′44″N 3°31′13″W	Category A	11074	Upload Photo
Bridge Over Water Of May, East Of Scott's Bridge				56°19′24″N 3°29′50″W	Category C(S)	13731	Upload Photo
Pathgreen Farm, Path Of Condie				56°17′16″N 3°29′54″W	Category B	11031	Upload Photo
Parish Church Of Forteviot				56°20′25″N 3°32′10″W	Category C(S)	11052	Upload another image
Manse Of Forteviot Sundial				56°20′22″N 3°32′07″W	Category C(S)	11056	Upload Photo
Forteviot Hall				56°20′25″N 3°32′07″W	Category A	11058	Upload another image
The Cottage, Forteviot				56°20′26″N 3°32′11″W	Category C(S)	11060	Upload Photo
Invermay House. Green Of Invermay Gates				56°19′48″N 3°32′09″W	Category C(S)	11066	Upload Photo
Invermay House, Estate Wall				56°19′32″N 3°31′27″W	Category B	11068	Upload Photo
Invermay House Scott's Bridge Over Water Of May				56°19′45″N 3°31′42″W	Category B	11070	Upload Photo
Invermay House				56°19′40″N 3°31′14″W	Category A	11071	Upload Photo
Pathstruie Bridge Over Water Of May				56°17′26″N 3°29′35″W	Category C(S)	11028	Upload Photo
Pathstruie Graveyard				56°17′19″N 3°29′44″W	Category C(S)	11030	Upload Photo
Invermay House, Gazebo				56°19′31″N 3°31′36″W	Category C(S)	11078	Upload Photo
Manse Of Forteviot				56°20′22″N 3°32′05″W	Category B	11055	Upload Photo
Kildinny Steading, West Block Only				56°20′34″N 3°30′37″W	Category B	11063	Upload Photo
Invermay House Doo'Cot				56°19′44″N 3°32′04″W	Category B	11069	Upload Photo
K6 Telephone Kiosk In Front Of Workshops, Forteviot Village				56°20′25″N 3°32′05″W	Category B	11062	Upload Photo
Green Of Invermay Bridge Over Water Of May				56°19′45″N 3°31′39″W	Category B	11065	Upload Photo
Summerhouse W. Of Invermay House				56°19′40″N 3°31′18″W	Category C(S)	11073	Upload Photo
Invermay House Stables				56°19′34″N 3°31′19″W	Category B	11076	Upload Photo
Muckersie Chapel				56°19′28″N 3°30′00″W	Category C(S)	11079	Upload Photo
Forteviot Hotel (Formerly Forteviot Inn), Including Outbuildings To North And Boundary Walls				56°20′30″N 3°32′38″W	Category B	13442	Upload Photo
Invermay House Home Farm				56°19′22″N 3°31′30″W	Category B	11077	Upload Photo
Forteviot Bridge Over River Earn				56°20′52″N 3°32′52″W	Category B	11027	Upload Photo
Invermay House Dairy				56°19′45″N 3°31′11″W	Category B	11075	Upload Photo
Whitehill Farm Cottage				56°16′28″N 3°28′56″W	Category C(S)	11032	Upload Photo
Parish Church Of Forteviot. Churchyard				56°20′25″N 3°32′10″W	Category C(S)	11054	Upload Photo
Forteviot Old School				56°20′26″N 3°32′05″W	Category C(S)	11059	Upload Photo
Workshops, Forteviot Village				56°20′25″N 3°32′06″W	Category B	11061	Upload Photo

== Key ==
The scheme for classifying buildings in Scotland is:

- Category A: "buildings of national or international importance, either architectural or historic; or fine, little-altered examples of some particular period, style or building type."
- Category B: "buildings of regional or more than local importance; or major examples of some particular period, style or building type, which may have been altered."
- Category C: "buildings of local importance; lesser examples of any period, style, or building type, as originally constructed or moderately altered; and simple traditional buildings which group well with other listed buildings."

In March 2016 there were 47,288 listed buildings in Scotland. Of these, 8% were Category A, and 50% were Category B, with the remaining 42% being Category C.
