= List of listed buildings in Weem, Perth and Kinross =

This is a list of listed buildings in the parish of Weem in Perth and Kinross, Scotland.

== List ==
Name	Location	Date Listed	Grid Ref. (Note: Sometimes known as OSGB36, the grid reference (where provided) is based on the British national grid reference system used by the Ordnance Survey. • "Guide to National Grid". Ordnance Survey. • "Get-a-map". Ordnance Survey.)	Geo-coordinates	Notes	LB Number (Note: Historic Environment Scotland assign a unique alphanumeric identifier to each designated site in Scotland, for listed buildings this always begins with "LB", for example "LB12345".)	Image
Weem Old Parish Kirk (Menzies Mausoleum)				56°37′32″N 3°53′15″W	Category A	17815	Upload Photo
Cluny House				56°38′28″N 3°49′45″W	Category B	17825	Upload Photo
Killiechassie Steading				56°37′53″N 3°51′17″W	Category C(S)	17828	Upload Photo
Blackhill House				56°34′46″N 3°30′38″W	Category B	17826	Upload Photo
Castle Menzies				56°37′26″N 3°53′49″W	Category A	43568	Upload Photo
Weem Old Parish Kirk Graveyard				56°37′32″N 3°53′15″W	Category C(S)	17816	Upload Photo
Castle Menzies, Walled Garden				56°37′30″N 3°53′44″W	Category B	17820	Upload Photo
Castle Menzies Home Farm, Farmhouse				56°37′14″N 3°54′21″W	Category C(S)	17821	Upload Photo
East Lodge Gatepiers, Castle Menzies				56°37′29″N 3°53′22″W	Category B	17819	Upload Photo
Weem Hotel (Weem Inn)				56°37′30″N 3°53′20″W	Category B	17818	Upload Photo
Derculich				56°39′00″N 3°48′43″W	Category B	17827	Upload Photo
Castle Menzies Steading				56°37′15″N 3°54′20″W	Category B	17822	Upload Photo
Mr Robertson Boltachan				56°37′36″N 3°52′11″W	Category C(S)	17824	Upload Photo
Killiechassie, Dovecot				56°37′55″N 3°51′18″W	Category B	19831	Upload Photo
Weem Manse				56°37′36″N 3°53′08″W	Category B	17817	Upload Photo
Old Toll House, S.E. Corner Weem-Aberfeldy And Weem-Strathtay Junction				56°37′33″N 3°52′45″W	Category C(S)	17823	Upload Photo

== Key ==
The scheme for classifying buildings in Scotland is:

- Category A: "buildings of national or international importance, either architectural or historic; or fine, little-altered examples of some particular period, style or building type."
- Category B: "buildings of regional or more than local importance; or major examples of some particular period, style or building type, which may have been altered."
- Category C: "buildings of local importance; lesser examples of any period, style, or building type, as originally constructed or moderately altered; and simple traditional buildings which group well with other listed buildings."

In March 2016 there were 47,288 listed buildings in Scotland. Of these, 8% were Category A, and 50% were Category B, with the remaining 42% being Category C.
