= List of listed buildings in Clunie, Perth and Kinross =

This is a list of listed buildings in the parish of Clunie in Perth and Kinross, Scotland.

== List ==
Name	Location	Date Listed	Grid Ref. (Note: Sometimes known as OSGB36, the grid reference (where provided) is based on the British national grid reference system used by the Ordnance Survey. • "Guide to National Grid". Ordnance Survey. • "Get-a-map". Ordnance Survey.)	Geo-coordinates	Notes	LB Number (Note: Historic Environment Scotland assign a unique alphanumeric identifier to each designated site in Scotland, for listed buildings this always begins with "LB", for example "LB12345".)	Image
Clunie Churchyard				56°34′47″N 3°27′04″W	Category C(S)	5836	Upload Photo
Clunie Manse, Formerly				56°34′45″N 3°27′05″W	Category C(S)	5837	Upload Photo
Laighwood House				56°35′43″N 3°30′26″W	Category C(S)	5849	Upload Photo
Clunie Parish Church				56°34′47″N 3°27′04″W	Category B	5883	Upload another image
'The Long Row' Craigie				56°34′31″N 3°26′15″W	Category B	5845	Upload Photo
Clunie Old Kirk, Fragment				56°34′47″N 3°27′05″W	Category B	5835	Upload Photo
Clunie Boathouse (Old) For Clunie Castle				56°34′45″N 3°26′53″W	Category C(S)	5842	Upload Photo
Roughstones Farm				56°35′53″N 3°28′25″W	Category B	5851	Upload Photo
Clunie Castle				56°34′47″N 3°26′43″W	Category A	5843	Upload another image
Craigton Cottage Butterston				56°35′43″N 3°31′27″W	Category B	5848	Upload Photo
St. Catherine's Tower				56°35′20″N 3°26′40″W	Category C(S)	5852	Upload Photo
Stars Of Forneth				56°35′21″N 3°27′09″W	Category B	5853	Upload Photo
Loch Cottage, On Clunie Castle Drive To Boathouse				56°34′44″N 3°26′57″W	Category C(S)	5841	Upload Photo
Forneth House				56°35′07″N 3°27′04″W	Category B	5844	Upload Photo
Milton Of Forneth, Bridge Over Lunan				56°35′21″N 3°28′22″W	Category C(S)	6193	Upload Photo
Clunie Motte, Castle Hill				56°34′47″N 3°26′57″W	Category B	5839	Upload Photo
The Ward, Clunie Summerhouse				56°34′51″N 3°27′10″W	Category C(S)	5840	Upload Photo
Benachally Monument Benachally Summit				56°37′24″N 3°31′25″W	Category C(S)	5847	Upload Photo
Laighwood Steading				56°35′44″N 3°30′33″W	Category C(S)	5850	Upload Photo
Clunie Castle, Gatepiers				56°34′44″N 3°27′02″W	Category B	5838	Upload Photo
Bridge Over Lunan, East End Of Clunie Loch				56°35′01″N 3°26′07″W	Category C(S)	5846	Upload Photo

== Key ==
The scheme for classifying buildings in Scotland is:

- Category A: "buildings of national or international importance, either architectural or historic; or fine, little-altered examples of some particular period, style or building type."
- Category B: "buildings of regional or more than local importance; or major examples of some particular period, style or building type, which may have been altered."
- Category C: "buildings of local importance; lesser examples of any period, style, or building type, as originally constructed or moderately altered; and simple traditional buildings which group well with other listed buildings."

In March 2016 there were 47,288 listed buildings in Scotland. Of these, 8% were Category A, and 50% were Category B, with the remaining 42% being Category C.
