= List of listed buildings in Cleish, Perth and Kinross =

This is a list of listed buildings in the parish of Cleish in Perth and Kinross, Scotland.

== List ==
Name	Location	Date Listed	Grid Ref. (Note: Sometimes known as OSGB36, the grid reference (where provided) is based on the British national grid reference system used by the Ordnance Survey. • "Guide to National Grid". Ordnance Survey. • "Get-a-map". Ordnance Survey.)	Geo-coordinates	Notes	LB Number (Note: Historic Environment Scotland assign a unique alphanumeric identifier to each designated site in Scotland, for listed buildings this always begins with "LB", for example "LB12345".)	Image
Cleish Castle				56°09′56″N 3°28′45″W	Category A	5711	Upload Photo
7-13 Keltybridge (All Odd Numbers)				56°08′36″N 3°23′13″W	Category C(S)	5278	Upload Photo
17-27 Keltybridge (All Odd Numbers)				56°08′37″N 3°23′13″W	Category C(S)	5279	Upload Photo
Parenwell, The Binn Cottage And Monument Set Into Front Garden Wall				56°09′22″N 3°23′00″W	Category B	5285	Upload Photo
Keltybridge Nos 14 (Formerly 14, 16) And 18, 20				56°08′39″N 3°23′17″W	Category C(S)	5286	Upload Photo
Cleish Public School, Kirkton Of Cleish				56°10′00″N 3°27′33″W	Category C(S)	5709	Upload another image
Coach-House Blair Adam Policies				56°08′43″N 3°24′19″W	Category B	5716	Upload Photo
Blairadam Estate, Blairfordel Lodge, Including Gates And Gatepiers				56°08′53″N 3°22′57″W	Category B	5720	Upload Photo
Middleton House Keltybridge				56°08′43″N 3°23′18″W	Category B	5280	Upload Photo
Blairfordel Farm Including; House, Steading, Gate Piers, Boundary Walls And Bridge Carrying Farm Track Over Kinnaird Burn				56°08′52″N 3°22′48″W	Category C(S)	49958	Upload Photo
Dowhill Including Former Stable Block, Courtyard, Ha-Ha And Gatepiers				56°09′45″N 3°25′16″W	Category B	49994	Upload Photo
Secession Church Monument Gairneybridge Farm				56°10′15″N 3°24′11″W	Category B	5282	Upload Photo
Blairforge Smiddy				56°09′03″N 3°23′13″W	Category B	6408	Upload Photo
Cleish Kirk (St. Mary's) Kirkton Of Cleish				56°10′01″N 3°27′34″W	Category B	5708	Upload Photo
Hardiston Farm House				56°09′33″N 3°30′53″W	Category B	5713	Upload Photo
North Blair Blair Adam Policies				56°08′57″N 3°24′06″W	Category B	5717	Upload Photo
Paranwell Bridge				56°09′25″N 3°23′12″W	Category B	5283	Upload Photo
Walled Garden Blair Adam Policies				56°08′55″N 3°23′57″W	Category B	5718	Upload Photo
Adam Monument In The Walled Garden Blair Adam Policies				56°08′55″N 3°23′57″W	Category B	5719	Upload Photo
Kelty Bridge Kelty Burn				56°08′34″N 3°23′13″W	Category B	5722	Upload Photo
Cleish Kirk, Churchyard Kirkton Of Cleish				56°10′01″N 3°27′35″W	Category C(S)	5712	Upload another image
Blair Adam House				56°08′46″N 3°24′11″W	Category A	5715	Upload Photo
Gairney Bridge, Gairney Water				56°10′23″N 3°24′18″W	Category B	5281	Upload Photo
Cleish House, Kirkton Of Cleish				56°10′04″N 3°27′44″W	Category B	5710	Upload Photo
Dullomuir House				56°08′38″N 3°23′33″W	Category B	5721	Upload Photo

== Key ==
The scheme for classifying buildings in Scotland is:

- Category A: "buildings of national or international importance, either architectural or historic; or fine, little-altered examples of some particular period, style or building type."
- Category B: "buildings of regional or more than local importance; or major examples of some particular period, style or building type, which may have been altered."
- Category C: "buildings of local importance; lesser examples of any period, style, or building type, as originally constructed or moderately altered; and simple traditional buildings which group well with other listed buildings."

In March 2016 there were 47,288 listed buildings in Scotland. Of these, 8% were Category A, and 50% were Category B, with the remaining 42% being Category C.
