= List of listed buildings in Inchture, Perth and Kinross =

This is a list of listed buildings in the parish of Inchture in Perth and Kinross, Scotland.

== List ==
Name	Location	Date Listed	Grid Ref. (Note: Sometimes known as OSGB36, the grid reference (where provided) is based on the British national grid reference system used by the Ordnance Survey. • "Guide to National Grid". Ordnance Survey. • "Get-a-map". Ordnance Survey.)	Geo-coordinates	Notes	LB Number (Note: Historic Environment Scotland assign a unique alphanumeric identifier to each designated site in Scotland, for listed buildings this always begins with "LB", for example "LB12345".)	Image
Castlehill, Baledgarno				56°27′37″N 3°10′35″W	Category B	11759	Upload Photo
Smith, Filling Station And Scott Inchture Village				56°26′44″N 3°10′05″W	Category C(S)	11772	Upload Photo
Post Office And House, Inchture Village				56°26′45″N 3°10′08″W	Category C(S)	11776	Upload Photo
Inchture Lodge And Gates (Formerly To Rossie Priory				56°27′47″N 3°09′46″W	Category B	11784	Upload Photo
The Cottage, Wester Ballindean				56°26′58″N 3°12′18″W	Category C(S)	11765	Upload Photo
Crighton, Watson And 2 Vacant Houses, Inchture Village				56°26′42″N 3°10′11″W	Category B	11774	Upload Photo
Inchture Hotel And Adjoining Cottage. Inchture Village				56°26′42″N 3°10′17″W	Category C(S)	11782	Upload Photo
Rossie Church Within Rossie Priory Policies				56°27′51″N 3°09′04″W	Category A	11786	Upload Photo
Baledgarno, N.W. Group Of Cottages, Baledgarno Mill. (Miller, Alcorn)				56°27′30″N 3°10′33″W	Category B	11791	Upload Photo
Baledgarno, Steading				56°27′29″N 3°10′35″W	Category C(S)	11757	Upload Photo
Burnside, Baledgarno				56°27′26″N 3°10′30″W	Category B	11758	Upload Photo
Inchture School				56°26′44″N 3°10′09″W	Category C(S)	11777	Upload Photo
Tighanrathad. (Runciman) Inchture Village				56°26′44″N 3°10′12″W	Category C(S)	11779	Upload Photo
Ballindean Walled Garden				56°27′15″N 3°11′26″W	Category B	13463	Upload Photo
Baledgarno, Farmhouse. (R. W. Wilson)				56°27′28″N 3°10′37″W	Category B	11756	Upload Photo
New Cottage, Morven And Corner House, Inchture Village				56°26′45″N 3°10′06″W	Category C(S)	11775	Upload Photo
Baledgarno, N.E. Group Of Cottages				56°27′31″N 3°10′31″W	Category B	11789	Upload another image
The Knapp Rossie Estate Sawmill Stable				56°28′19″N 3°10′27″W	Category B	13318	Upload Photo
The Knapp North Lodge				56°28′24″N 3°10′56″W	Category B	13319	Upload Photo
Ballindean West Lodge				56°27′04″N 3°12′09″W	Category B	11763	Upload Photo
Moncur Castle, Within Rossie Priory Policies				56°27′09″N 3°09′50″W	Category B	11785	Upload another image
Baledgarno, Footbridge Over Baledgarno Burn				56°27′31″N 3°10′33″W	Category C(S)	11793	Upload Photo
Ballindean Steading				56°27′15″N 3°11′35″W	Category B	13480	Upload Photo
Wester Ballindean Cottages				56°27′00″N 3°12′20″W	Category B	11766	Upload Photo
Inchture Parish Church, Churchyard				56°26′44″N 3°10′03″W	Category C(S)	11771	Upload Photo
Carselea (Logie) And Milne, Inchture Village				56°26′44″N 3°10′11″W	Category B	11778	Upload Photo
Crossgates. Inchture Village				56°26′36″N 3°10′27″W	Category B	11783	Upload Photo
Baledgarno, S.W. Group Of Cottages (Napier, J.Crichton				56°27′28″N 3°10′34″W	Category C(S)	11792	Upload Photo
Inchmartine, Lodge House And Gatepiers				56°26′08″N 3°11′40″W	Category B	11767	Upload Photo
Wester Ballindean Farmhouse				56°27′00″N 3°12′23″W	Category C(S)	12438	Upload Photo
Ballindean House				56°27′21″N 3°11′18″W	Category A	11760	Upload another image
Ballindean South Lodge And Gates,				56°27′03″N 3°11′20″W	Category B	11761	Upload Photo
Inchture Parish Church				56°26′44″N 3°10′03″W	Category B	11770	Upload Photo
Rose Cottage (Urquhart) And Mudie. Inchture Village				56°26′43″N 3°10′06″W	Category C(S)	11773	Upload Photo
Market Cross, Old Rossie Within Rossie Priory Policies				56°27′48″N 3°09′01″W	Category A	11787	Upload Photo
Rossie Priory				56°27′50″N 3°09′42″W	Category B	11788	Upload Photo
The Knapp Rossie Estate Sawmill Seasoning Shed				56°28′19″N 3°10′25″W	Category C(S)	13317	Upload Photo
Ballindean Nursery Lodge				56°27′22″N 3°11′23″W	Category B	11762	Upload Photo
Easter Ballindean, Farmhouse				56°27′15″N 3°11′35″W	Category C(S)	11764	Upload Photo
Baledgarno, S.E. Group Of Cottages				56°27′28″N 3°10′26″W	Category B	11790	Upload Photo

== Key ==
The scheme for classifying buildings in Scotland is:

- Category A: "buildings of national or international importance, either architectural or historic; or fine, little-altered examples of some particular period, style or building type."
- Category B: "buildings of regional or more than local importance; or major examples of some particular period, style or building type, which may have been altered."
- Category C: "buildings of local importance; lesser examples of any period, style, or building type, as originally constructed or moderately altered; and simple traditional buildings which group well with other listed buildings."

In March 2016 there were 47,288 listed buildings in Scotland. Of these, 8% were Category A, and 50% were Category B, with the remaining 42% being Category C.
