= List of listed buildings in Trinity Gask, Perth and Kinross =

This is a list of listed buildings in the parish of Trinity Gask in Perth and Kinross, Scotland.

== List ==
Name	Location	Date Listed	Grid Ref. (Note: Sometimes known as OSGB36, the grid reference (where provided) is based on the British national grid reference system used by the Ordnance Survey. • "Guide to National Grid". Ordnance Survey. • "Get-a-map". Ordnance Survey.)	Geo-coordinates	Notes	LB Number (Note: Historic Environment Scotland assign a unique alphanumeric identifier to each designated site in Scotland, for listed buildings this always begins with "LB", for example "LB12345".)	Image
Colquhalzie, Stable Block And Walled Garden				56°20′12″N 3°45′39″W	Category B	17772	Upload Photo
Churchyard Of Trinity-Gask				56°20′44″N 3°40′48″W	Category C(S)	17774	Upload Photo
Trinity Gask Schoolhouse And Original School Room Only				56°20′26″N 3°41′26″W	Category C(S)	17776	Upload Photo
Duke's Tower, Colquhalzie				56°19′53″N 3°45′40″W	Category C(S)	19824	Upload Photo
Kinkell Church				56°19′32″N 3°43′09″W	Category B	17770	Upload Photo
Trinity Gask House (Former Manse Of Trinity Gask)				56°20′45″N 3°40′52″W	Category C(S)	17775	Upload Photo
Borestone Cottage				56°20′47″N 3°39′46″W	Category B	17777	Upload Photo
Millearne, Ice House				56°19′59″N 3°43′46″W	Category C(S)	17764	Upload Photo
Millearne, The Monument				56°19′55″N 3°44′15″W	Category C(S)	17766	Upload Photo
Millearne, Formal Terrace Garden, Walled Gardens And Font				56°19′59″N 3°44′08″W	Category B	17765	Upload Photo
Millearne, Stable (Garage) Block				56°20′01″N 3°43′59″W	Category B	51399	Upload Photo
St. Bean's Church, And Churchyard, Kinkell				56°19′35″N 3°43′08″W	Category B	17769	Upload Photo
Millearne, South Gateway, Gates And Boundary Walls				56°19′52″N 3°43′43″W	Category C(S)	51400	Upload Photo
Kinkell Bridge				56°19′50″N 3°43′44″W	Category B	17768	Upload Photo
Parish Church Of Trinity-Gask				56°20′44″N 3°40′48″W	Category C(S)	17773	Upload Photo
Mills Of Earn, House				56°19′56″N 3°44′44″W	Category B	17767	Upload Photo
Colquhalzie House				56°20′13″N 3°45′31″W	Category A	17771	Upload Photo

== Key ==
The scheme for classifying buildings in Scotland is:

- Category A: "buildings of national or international importance, either architectural or historic; or fine, little-altered examples of some particular period, style or building type."
- Category B: "buildings of regional or more than local importance; or major examples of some particular period, style or building type, which may have been altered."
- Category C: "buildings of local importance; lesser examples of any period, style, or building type, as originally constructed or moderately altered; and simple traditional buildings which group well with other listed buildings."

In March 2016 there were 47,288 listed buildings in Scotland. Of these, 8% were Category A, and 50% were Category B, with the remaining 42% being Category C.
