= List of listed buildings in Logierait, Perth and Kinross =

This is a list of listed buildings in the parish of Logierait in Perth and Kinross, Scotland.

== List ==
Name	Location	Date Listed	Grid Ref. (Note: Sometimes known as OSGB36, the grid reference (where provided) is based on the British national grid reference system used by the Ordnance Survey. • "Guide to National Grid". Ordnance Survey. • "Get-a-map". Ordnance Survey.)	Geo-coordinates	Notes	LB Number (Note: Historic Environment Scotland assign a unique alphanumeric identifier to each designated site in Scotland, for listed buildings this always begins with "LB", for example "LB12345".)	Image
Laidnaskea Farmhouse				56°38′35″N 3°48′01″W	Category B	13789	Upload Photo
Moulinearn				56°40′25″N 3°41′05″W	Category B	11840	Upload Photo
Tulliemet House				56°40′01″N 3°38′21″W	Category B	11843	Upload Photo
Westhaugh Of Tulliemet, Steading. Haugh Of Tulliemet				56°38′30″N 3°39′14″W	Category B	11847	Upload Photo
Logierait Railway Viaduct Over R. Tay				56°38′48″N 3°41′01″W	Category A	11851	Upload another image
Holy Cross R.C. Church, Strathtay				56°39′45″N 3°46′11″W	Category B	11860	Upload Photo
Fyndynate Lodge				56°39′19″N 3°47′38″W	Category B	11862	Upload Photo
Clochfoldich House				56°39′22″N 3°48′09″W	Category B	11863	Upload Photo
Clochfoldich Stable-Block				56°39′23″N 3°48′13″W	Category C(S)	11864	Upload Photo
Laird's House Pitcastle				56°40′46″N 3°40′39″W	Category B	11852	Upload Photo
Laidnaskea, Steading				56°38′36″N 3°47′59″W	Category C(S)	11866	Upload Photo
Logierait Hotel				56°38′51″N 3°40′55″W	Category C(S)	13788	Upload Photo
Logierait Parish Church				56°38′55″N 3°41′05″W	Category B	11893	Upload Photo
Cross Slab, 200 Yds. S.E. Of Westhaugh Of Tulliemet				56°38′26″N 3°39′05″W	Category B	11849	Upload Photo
Pitnacree House				56°39′56″N 3°45′19″W	Category B	11858	Upload Photo
Logierait, Cuil-An-Daraich, Former Athole And Breadalbane Poorhouse, Including Gatepiers And Boundary Walls				56°39′05″N 3°41′16″W	Category C(S)	44619	Upload Photo
Grantully Chapel (Including Adjoining Walls, Gates, Etc.)				56°38′03″N 3°48′58″W	Category A	11831	Upload Photo
Logierait Churchyard				56°38′55″N 3°41′05″W	Category B	11838	Upload Photo
Ferry Cottage, Logierait				56°39′38″N 3°45′22″W	Category C(S)	11839	Upload Photo
Blaranrash, Tulliemet				56°40′04″N 3°38′06″W	Category B	11844	Upload Photo
Middlehaugh Of Dalshian				56°41′22″N 3°42′22″W	Category B	11853	Upload Photo
Fyndynate House				56°39′26″N 3°47′34″W	Category B	11861	Upload Photo
Baptist Chapel, Birchcraig By Ballinluig				56°39′51″N 3°39′45″W	Category B	11842	Upload Photo
Milton Of Tulliemet,				56°39′18″N 3°38′15″W	Category B	11845	Upload Photo
Westhaugh Of Tulliemet Farmhouse				56°38′31″N 3°39′15″W	Category C(S)	11848	Upload Photo
Pitnacree House S.W. Block Of Stables And Steading				56°39′58″N 3°45′11″W	Category B	11859	Upload Photo
Daniel Stewart's Free School (Formerly) Now Commonly Called Kinnears				56°39′08″N 3°46′49″W	Category B	11865	Upload Photo
Grandtully Castle				56°38′27″N 3°48′35″W	Category A	11830	Upload another image See more images
Wester Achnaguie, Farmhouse				56°39′10″N 3°37′46″W	Category B	11846	Upload Photo
Dunfallandy Farm (Former Stables & C.)				56°41′21″N 3°43′22″W	Category B	11855	Upload Photo
Cuil-An-Duin				56°38′30″N 3°38′55″W	Category B	11850	Upload Photo
Dunfallandy House Hotel				56°41′23″N 3°43′22″W	Category B	11854	Upload Photo
Fergusson Burial Enclosure Dunfallandy				56°41′19″N 3°43′21″W	Category C(S)	11857	Upload Photo
Grandtully, The Curling Hut				56°38′39″N 3°48′16″W	Category C(S)	48650	Upload Photo

== Key ==
The scheme for classifying buildings in Scotland is:

- Category A: "buildings of national or international importance, either architectural or historic; or fine, little-altered examples of some particular period, style or building type."
- Category B: "buildings of regional or more than local importance; or major examples of some particular period, style or building type, which may have been altered."
- Category C: "buildings of local importance; lesser examples of any period, style, or building type, as originally constructed or moderately altered; and simple traditional buildings which group well with other listed buildings."

In March 2016 there were 47,288 listed buildings in Scotland. Of these, 8% were Category A, and 50% were Category B, with the remaining 42% being Category C.
