= List of listed buildings in Aberdalgie, Perth and Kinross =

This is a list of listed buildings in the parish of Aberdalgie in Perth and Kinross, Scotland.

== List ==
| Name | Location | Date Listed | Grid Ref. (Note: Sometimes known as OSGB36, the grid reference (where provided) is based on the British national grid reference system used by the Ordnance Survey. • "Guide to National Grid". Ordnance Survey. • "Get-a-map". Ordnance Survey.) | Geo-coordinates | Notes | LB Number (Note: Historic Environment Scotland assign a unique alphanumeric identifier to each designated site in Scotland, for listed buildings this always begins with "LB", for example "LB12345".) | Image |
|---|---|---|---|---|---|---|---|
| Kinmonth And Cormack Miltown Of Aberdalgie | | | | 56°22′07″N 3°29′47″W | Category C(S) | 5865 | Upload Photo |
| Aberdalgie Lodge And Adjoining Offices | | | | 56°21′55″N 3°29′32″W | Category C(S) | 5862 | Upload Photo |
| Aberdalgie, K6 Telephone Kiosk | | | | 56°22′04″N 3°29′52″W | Category B | 5876 | Upload another image |
| Memorial Fountain, Near East Lamberkin | | | | 56°23′16″N 3°29′31″W | Category C(S) | 5869 | Upload Photo |
| Dupplin Castle Stables | | | | 56°21′30″N 3°31′58″W | Category B | 5873 | Upload Photo |
| Dupplin Castle, Estate Office And Adjoining Cottages | | | | 56°21′31″N 3°32′01″W | Category B | 5874 | Upload Photo |
| Aberdalgie Manse | | | | 56°21′58″N 3°29′34″W | Category C(S) | 5861 | Upload Photo |
| Carmichael Milltown Of Aberdalgie | | | | 56°22′07″N 3°29′50″W | Category C(S) | 5867 | Upload Photo |
| East Lodge And Gates Dupplin Castle | | | | 56°21′46″N 3°30′22″W | Category B | 5871 | Upload Photo |
| Dupplin Graveyard | | | | 56°21′28″N 3°30′57″W | Category C(S) | 5875 | Upload Photo |
| Registrar's House, Milltown Of Aberdalgie | | | | 56°22′09″N 3°29′56″W | Category C(S) | 44183 | Upload Photo |
| Aberdalgie Church Yard And War Memorial | | | | 56°21′56″N 3°29′33″W | Category C(S) | 5860 | Upload Photo |
| Aberdalgie House | | | | 56°21′56″N 3°29′22″W | Category B | 5863 | Upload Photo |
| Rose Cottage Milltown Of Aberdalgie | | | | 56°22′07″N 3°29′48″W | Category C(S) | 5866 | Upload Photo |
| Aberdalgie And Dupplin Parish Church | | | | 56°21′56″N 3°29′30″W | Category B | 5859 | Upload another image See more images |
| Aberdalgie House, Offices | | | | 56°21′57″N 3°29′22″W | Category B | 5864 | Upload Photo |
| Tobruk Cottage | | | | 56°22′04″N 3°29′53″W | Category C(S) | 5868 | Upload Photo |
| North Lodge And Gates. Dupplin Castle | | | | 56°22′15″N 3°31′11″W | Category B | 5870 | Upload Photo |
| South Lodge And Gates Dupplin Castle | | | | 56°21′17″N 3°31′32″W | Category C(S) | 5872 | Upload Photo |

== Key ==
The scheme for classifying buildings in Scotland is:

- Category A: "buildings of national or international importance, either architectural or historic; or fine, little-altered examples of some particular period, style or building type."
- Category B: "buildings of regional or more than local importance; or major examples of some particular period, style or building type, which may have been altered."
- Category C: "buildings of local importance; lesser examples of any period, style, or building type, as originally constructed or moderately altered; and simple traditional buildings which group well with other listed buildings."

In March 2016 there were 47,288 listed buildings in Scotland. Of these, 8% were Category A, and 50% were Category B, with the remaining 42% being Category C.
