= List of listed buildings in Abernyte, Perth and Kinross =

This is a list of listed buildings in the parish of Abernyte in Perth and Kinross, Scotland.

== List ==
Name	Location	Date Listed	Grid Ref. (Note: Sometimes known as OSGB36, the grid reference (where provided) is based on the British national grid reference system used by the Ordnance Survey. • "Guide to National Grid". Ordnance Survey. • "Get-a-map". Ordnance Survey.)	Geo-coordinates	Notes	LB Number (Note: Historic Environment Scotland assign a unique alphanumeric identifier to each designated site in Scotland, for listed buildings this always begins with "LB", for example "LB12345".)	Image
Balfour Cottage				56°28′07″N 3°12′19″W	Category C(S)	5855	Upload Photo
Stewart, Abernyte				56°28′09″N 3°12′26″W	Category C(S)	5857	Upload Photo
Abernyte Parish Church				56°28′00″N 3°11′29″W	Category B	5884	Upload Photo
The Bield, Abernyte				56°28′07″N 3°12′20″W	Category B	5856	Upload Photo
Whitehills				56°27′54″N 3°13′28″W	Category C(S)	5858	Upload Photo
'Gavintown House' Including Garden Walls And Gates				56°28′00″N 3°11′26″W	Category B	5886	Upload Photo
Parish Church, Churchyard				56°28′00″N 3°11′30″W	Category C(S)	5885	Upload Photo
Old Smithy, Abernyte				56°28′05″N 3°12′19″W	Category C(S)	5854	Upload Photo

== Key ==
The scheme for classifying buildings in Scotland is:

- Category A: "buildings of national or international importance, either architectural or historic; or fine, little-altered examples of some particular period, style or building type."
- Category B: "buildings of regional or more than local importance; or major examples of some particular period, style or building type, which may have been altered."
- Category C: "buildings of local importance; lesser examples of any period, style, or building type, as originally constructed or moderately altered; and simple traditional buildings which group well with other listed buildings."

In March 2016 there were 47,288 listed buildings in Scotland. Of these, 8% were Category A, and 50% were Category B, with the remaining 42% being Category C.
