= List of listed buildings in Glendevon, Perth and Kinross =

This is a list of listed buildings in the parish of Glendevon in Perth and Kinross, Scotland.

== List ==
Name	Location	Date Listed	Grid Ref. (Note: Sometimes known as OSGB36, the grid reference (where provided) is based on the British national grid reference system used by the Ordnance Survey. • "Guide to National Grid". Ordnance Survey. • "Get-a-map". Ordnance Survey.)	Geo-coordinates	Notes	LB Number (Note: Historic Environment Scotland assign a unique alphanumeric identifier to each designated site in Scotland, for listed buildings this always begins with "LB", for example "LB12345".)	Image
Glendevon House				56°13′29″N 3°38′50″W	Category B	11827	Upload Photo
Glendevon Parish Church				56°13′40″N 3°38′51″W	Category B	11821	Upload Photo
Wester Glensherup, Old House Of, Now Garage And Loft				56°13′38″N 3°40′03″W	Category B	11825	Upload Photo
Bridge Over River Devon On Dunning - Yetts Of Muckart Road				56°12′31″N 3°36′14″W	Category C(S)	11799	Upload Photo
Glensherup Bridge Over River Devon				56°13′44″N 3°40′06″W	Category C(S)	11824	Upload Photo
Glendevon House Steading				56°13′32″N 3°38′58″W	Category C(S)	47263	Upload Photo
Glenquey				56°12′43″N 3°38′31″W	Category B	11798	Upload Photo
Glendevon House, Entrance Archway				56°13′30″N 3°38′30″W	Category B	11828	Upload Photo
Borland				56°13′33″N 3°38′10″W	Category B	11794	Upload Photo
Castle Hotel (Formerly Tormaukin) Gateway Only				56°13′17″N 3°37′28″W	Category C(S)	11796	Upload Photo
Blacklinn Bridge Over River Devon				56°13′13″N 3°37′26″W	Category B	11797	Upload Photo
Tarmangie House (Former Manse Of Glendevon)				56°13′40″N 3°38′49″W	Category C(S)	13787	Upload Photo
Burnfoot Bridge Over River Devon				56°13′17″N 3°37′45″W	Category C(S)	11795	Upload Photo
Glendevon Parish Church, Churchyard				56°13′40″N 3°38′51″W	Category C(S)	11822	Upload Photo
Kaimknow Farmhouse				56°13′46″N 3°40′54″W	Category B	11826	Upload Photo
Glendevon Castle				56°13′51″N 3°39′09″W	Category B	11823	Upload Photo
Glendevon Bridge Over River Devon At Glendevon House Gate				56°13′29″N 3°38′26″W	Category B	11829	Upload Photo

== Key ==
The scheme for classifying buildings in Scotland is:

- Category A: "buildings of national or international importance, either architectural or historic; or fine, little-altered examples of some particular period, style or building type."
- Category B: "buildings of regional or more than local importance; or major examples of some particular period, style or building type, which may have been altered."
- Category C: "buildings of local importance; lesser examples of any period, style, or building type, as originally constructed or moderately altered; and simple traditional buildings which group well with other listed buildings."

In March 2016 there were 47,288 listed buildings in Scotland. Of these, 8% were Category A, and 50% were Category B, with the remaining 42% being Category C.
