= List of listed buildings in Kilspindie, Perth and Kinross =

This is a list of listed buildings in the parish of Kilspindie in Perth and Kinross, Scotland.

== List ==
Name	Location	Date Listed	Grid Ref. (Note: Sometimes known as OSGB36, the grid reference (where provided) is based on the British national grid reference system used by the Ordnance Survey. • "Guide to National Grid". Ordnance Survey. • "Get-a-map". Ordnance Survey.)	Geo-coordinates	Notes	LB Number (Note: Historic Environment Scotland assign a unique alphanumeric identifier to each designated site in Scotland, for listed buildings this always begins with "LB", for example "LB12345".)	Image
Font, Cross Etc. Fingask Castle Gardens				56°25′58″N 3°15′12″W	Category B	11638	Upload Photo
Bridge Over Craig Burn, Fingask Castle				56°26′05″N 3°15′08″W	Category C(S)	11640	Upload Photo
Kilspindie Parish Church				56°25′03″N 3°15′57″W	Category B	11644	Upload Photo
Kilspindie Castle Wall				56°25′04″N 3°16′01″W	Category C(S)	11649	Upload Photo
Fingask Castle, Old Sawmill				56°26′14″N 3°15′07″W	Category B	50469	Upload Photo
Fingask Castle, Walled Garden				56°25′51″N 3°15′03″W	Category C(S)	12382	Upload Photo
Glenview, Rait (Including Maclavin Block)				56°25′39″N 3°15′32″W	Category C(S)	11631	Upload Photo
Post Office, Rait (Oakview)				56°25′39″N 3°15′25″W	Category C(S)	11633	Upload Photo
Kilspindie Doocot				56°25′06″N 3°16′06″W	Category B	11652	Upload Photo
Mr. Clark, Rait				56°25′38″N 3°15′24″W	Category C(S)	11658	Upload Photo
Fingask Castle Gardens, Statuary				56°25′57″N 3°15′09″W	Category B	11636	Upload Photo
St. Peter's Wishing Well				56°26′03″N 3°15′09″W	Category B	11639	Upload Photo
Kilspindie Farmhouse				56°25′04″N 3°16′03″W	Category C(S)	11650	Upload Photo
Rait Farmhouse				56°25′36″N 3°15′17″W	Category B	11655	Upload Photo
Mr. Lawrence (Thatcher), Rait "Fernbank"				56°25′38″N 3°15′30″W	Category C(S)	11660	Upload Photo
Kilspindie Churchyard				56°25′03″N 3°15′57″W	Category C(S)	11646	Upload Photo
Fingask Castle Gardens Well West Of Castle				56°25′57″N 3°15′09″W	Category B	11637	Upload Photo
Glendruid				56°24′43″N 3°16′53″W	Category C(S)	11643	Upload Photo
Kilspindie Manse				56°25′01″N 3°16′00″W	Category C(S)	11647	Upload Photo
Kilspindie Farm				56°25′06″N 3°16′02″W	Category C(S)	11651	Upload Photo
Kilspindie School				56°25′09″N 3°16′08″W	Category C(S)	11653	Upload Photo
The Sheiling, Rait				56°25′38″N 3°15′22″W	Category C(S)	11656	Upload Photo
Craiglochie Cottage				56°24′30″N 3°17′41″W	Category C(S)	13775	Upload Photo
Fingask Castle, Sundial				56°25′58″N 3°15′10″W	Category B	11635	Upload Photo
Evelick Castle				56°25′09″N 3°17′32″W	Category B	11641	Upload Photo
Stuart Of Rait Mausoleum. Kilspindie Churchyard				56°25′03″N 3°15′57″W	Category B	11645	Upload Photo
Evelick, Steading				56°25′08″N 3°17′35″W	Category C(S)	11642	Upload Photo
Braehead, Rait				56°25′37″N 3°15′24″W	Category C(S)	11657	Upload Photo
West End Cottage, Rait				56°25′39″N 3°15′35″W	Category C(S)	11632	Upload Photo
Fingask Castle				56°25′59″N 3°15′13″W	Category B	11634	Upload Photo
Braehead Cottage (Kilspindie Farm Cottage)				56°25′09″N 3°16′03″W	Category C(S)	11648	Upload Photo
Rait Churchyard				56°25′39″N 3°15′15″W	Category C(S)	11654	Upload Photo

== Key ==
The scheme for classifying buildings in Scotland is:

- Category A: "buildings of national or international importance, either architectural or historic; or fine, little-altered examples of some particular period, style or building type."
- Category B: "buildings of regional or more than local importance; or major examples of some particular period, style or building type, which may have been altered."
- Category C: "buildings of local importance; lesser examples of any period, style, or building type, as originally constructed or moderately altered; and simple traditional buildings which group well with other listed buildings."

In March 2016 there were 47,288 listed buildings in Scotland. Of these, 8% were Category A, and 50% were Category B, with the remaining 42% being Category C.
