= List of listed buildings in Methven, Perth and Kinross =

This is a list of listed buildings in the parish of Methven in Perth and Kinross, Scotland.

== List ==
Name	Location	Date listed	Geo-coordinates	Notes	Category	LB number	Image
Methven Castle, Sundial			56°25′00″N 3°33′35″W		B	17896	Upload Photo
Dalcrue Bridge Over River Almond			56°26′03″N 3°33′03″W		B	17898	Upload Photo
Lynedoch Cottage			56°26′27″N 3°34′00″W		B	17899	Upload Photo
Trinity College, Glenalmond Main Building			56°26′31″N 3°39′36″W		A	17869	Upload Photo
Methven Parish Church Graveyard			56°25′00″N 3°34′51″W		B	17873	Upload another image
Smiddy, Off Main Street,			56°24′57″N 3°34′47″W		C(S)	17876	Upload Photo
Pullars' And 2 Church Road			56°24′56″N 3°34′48″W		C(S)	17877	Upload Photo
Glenalmond College, Music Practice And Teaching Rooms			56°26′27″N 3°39′32″W		C(S)	51781	Upload Photo
Tippermallo Including Walled Garden			56°24′15″N 3°35′08″W		B	19841	Upload Photo
Bell Tree Inn, Main Street			56°24′56″N 3°34′49″W		C(S)	17878	Upload Photo
78 Main Street			56°24′55″N 3°34′55″W		C(S)	17884	Upload Photo
80 Main Street			56°24′55″N 3°34′56″W		C(S)	17885	Upload Photo
6 Church Road			56°24′57″N 3°34′48″W		C(S)	17887	Upload Photo
Methven Castle			56°25′01″N 3°33′18″W		A	17895	Upload Photo
Surviving Wing Of Former Balgowan House			56°23′41″N 3°38′31″W		C(S)	17871	Upload Photo
58 Main Street,			56°24′56″N 3°34′51″W		C(S)	19840	Upload Photo
6 And 7 The Square			56°24′57″N 3°34′53″W		C(S)	17881	Upload Photo
Old Bridge Of Ardittie Millhaugh Over River Almond			56°26′46″N 3°37′19″W		B	17868	Upload Photo
Methven Parish Church			56°25′00″N 3°34′51″W		B	19843	Upload another image
56 Main Street,			56°24′56″N 3°34′50″W		C(S)	17879	Upload Photo
76 Main Street			56°24′56″N 3°34′55″W		C(S)	17883	Upload Photo
11 Retinue Row (Denside)			56°24′59″N 3°34′54″W		C(S)	17889	Upload Photo
Lodge Trinity College Glenalmond			56°26′07″N 3°39′51″W		B	19838	Upload Photo
Legge, 3 Retinue Row (Denside)			56°24′59″N 3°34′56″W		B	17888	Upload Photo
Methven Castle Lodge			56°25′00″N 3°33′48″W		B	17894	Upload Photo
Former U.P. (Later U.F.) Church Main Street (Now Youth Club)			56°24′58″N 3°34′44″W		C(S)	17874	Upload Photo
Dalcrue, North Wing Of Steading			56°26′01″N 3°33′15″W		B	19842	Upload Photo
Dalcrue House			56°26′02″N 3°33′12″W		A	17897	Upload Photo
Cottage And Former Offices Of Lynedoch Cottage			56°26′33″N 3°34′00″W		B	17900	Upload Photo
Lynedoch Mausoleum Methven Parish Church Graveyard			56°25′00″N 3°34′51″W		B	17872	Upload Photo
44 Main Street			56°24′57″N 3°34′46″W		C(S)	17875	Upload Photo
46 Main Street			56°24′57″N 3°34′47″W		C(S)	19839	Upload Photo
A. Reid's And W.C. Macdonald's Main Street			56°24′56″N 3°34′53″W		C(S)	17880	Upload Photo
Manse Of Methven			56°25′02″N 3°34′53″W		B	17891	Upload Photo
Methven Aisle Methven Parish Church Graveyard			56°25′00″N 3°34′51″W		A	17928	Upload Photo
Glenalmond Mercer Burial Ground			56°26′14″N 3°41′31″W		C(S)	17870	Upload Photo
74 Main Street			56°24′56″N 3°34′54″W		C(S)	17882	Upload Photo
3 Church Road			56°24′57″N 3°34′49″W		C(S)	17886	Upload Photo
13 Retinue Row (Denside)			56°24′59″N 3°34′54″W		C(S)	17890	Upload Photo
Greystones, Lyndoch Road			56°25′07″N 3°34′47″W		C(S)	17892	Upload Photo
Bannochy, Lyndoch Road			56°25′06″N 3°34′41″W		C(S)	17893	Upload Photo

== Key ==
The scheme for classifying buildings in Scotland is:

- Category A: "buildings of national or international importance, either architectural or historic; or fine, little-altered examples of some particular period, style or building type."
- Category B: "buildings of regional or more than local importance; or major examples of some particular period, style or building type, which may have been altered."
- Category C: "buildings of local importance; lesser examples of any period, style, or building type, as originally constructed or moderately altered; and simple traditional buildings which group well with other listed buildings."

In March 2016 there were 47,288 listed buildings in Scotland. Of these, 8% were Category A, and 50% were Category B, with the remaining 42% being Category C.
