= List of listed buildings in Meigle, Perth and Kinross =

This is a list of listed buildings in the parish of Meigle in Perth and Kinross, Scotland.

== List ==
Name	Location	Date listed	Grid ref. (Note: Sometimes known as OSGB36, the grid reference (where provided) is based on the British national grid reference system used by the Ordnance Survey. • "Guide to National Grid". Ordnance Survey. • "Get-a-map". Ordnance Survey.)	Geo-coordinates	Notes	LB number (Note: Historic Environment Scotland assign a unique alphanumeric identifier to each designated site in Scotland, for listed buildings this always begins with "LB", for example "LB12345".)	Image
Drumkilbo Home Farm, Steading				56°35′22″N 3°08′14″W	Category C(S)	18314	Upload Photo
Sawmill At Bridge Of Dean. (Former Lint Mill)				56°35′56″N 3°09′44″W	Category B	18316	Upload Photo
Meigle, Saddlers Shop And Property Over At Junction Of A 94 And A 927, Property Of George Dick				56°35′18″N 3°09′46″W	Category C(S)	18321	Upload Photo
Old Balmacron, Meigle				56°35′14″N 3°10′02″W	Category B	18330	Upload Photo
Belmont Castle S.W. Lodge. (Now Entrance To Belmont Camp)				56°34′36″N 3°17′22″W	Category B	18334	Upload Photo
Old Bridge Of Dean, (So-Called Roman Bridge)				56°35′58″N 3°09′41″W	Category B	18317	Upload Photo
Dundee Road, Meigle Bowling Club, The Old Pavilion (Centrally Positioned On North-Eastern Boundary Of The Bowling Green)				56°35′08″N 3°09′31″W	Category B	18318	Upload Photo
Meigle Churchyard				56°35′16″N 3°09′45″W	Category C(S)	18320	Upload Photo
Meigle, Former Angel Inn, Wortley Place, Dundee Rd				56°35′15″N 3°09′47″W	Category C(S)	18325	Upload Photo
Meigle House Hotel, Garden Wall And Gazebo Between Items 10 & 11 On List				56°35′21″N 3°09′52″W	Category B	18329	Upload Photo
Drumkilbo Home Farm, Farmhouse				56°35′22″N 3°08′10″W	Category C(S)	18336	Upload Photo
Meigle Parish Church				56°35′16″N 3°09′43″W	Category C(S)	18319	Upload Photo
Meigle Manse				56°35′12″N 3°09′43″W	Category C(S)	18326	Upload Photo
Belmont Castle				56°34′55″N 3°09′49″W	Category A	18332	Upload Photo
Meigle, Old Bank House				56°35′18″N 3°09′48″W	Category B	18323	Upload Photo
Belmont Castle, Stables				56°34′58″N 3°09′52″W	Category B	18333	Upload Photo
Meigle, Cottage Adjacent To Item 3 On List, South Side				56°35′17″N 3°09′46″W	Category C(S)	18322	Upload Photo
Meigle Museum				56°35′15″N 3°09′44″W	Category A	18327	Upload Photo
Kinloch Mausoleum, Near Kinloch House				56°35′02″N 3°11′10″W	Category B	18331	Upload Photo
Drumkilbo House And Walled Garden				56°35′25″N 3°08′07″W	Category B	18335	Upload Photo
Old Balmacron Bridge Over Meigle Burn				56°35′14″N 3°09′58″W	Category C(S)	19873	Upload Photo
New Bridge Of Dean, Over River Dean At Cardean				56°35′56″N 3°09′49″W	Category C(S)	18315	Upload Photo
Meigle House Hotel, Steading				56°35′22″N 3°09′50″W	Category B	18328	Upload Photo

== Key ==
The scheme for classifying buildings in Scotland is:

- Category A: "buildings of national or international importance, either architectural or historic; or fine, little-altered examples of some particular period, style or building type."
- Category B: "buildings of regional or more than local importance; or major examples of some particular period, style or building type, which may have been altered."
- Category C: "buildings of local importance; lesser examples of any period, style, or building type, as originally constructed or moderately altered; and simple traditional buildings which group well with other listed buildings."

In March 2016 there were 47,288 listed buildings in Scotland. Of these, 8% were Category A, and 50% were Category B, with the remaining 42% being Category C.
