= List of listed buildings in Blackford, Perth and Kinross =

This is a list of listed buildings in the parish of Blackford in Perth and Kinross, Scotland.

== List ==
Name	Location	Date listed	Grid ref. (Note: Sometimes known as OSGB36, the grid reference (where provided) is based on the British national grid reference system used by the Ordnance Survey. • "Guide to National Grid". Ordnance Survey. • "Get-a-map". Ordnance Survey.)	Geo-coordinates	Notes	LB number (Note: Historic Environment Scotland assign a unique alphanumeric identifier to each designated site in Scotland, for listed buildings this always begins with "LB", for example "LB12345".)	Image
Gleneagles Tollhouse				56°14′54″N 3°42′45″W	Category B	4549	Upload Photo
Bridge Over Prestney Burn, South Drive, Strathallan Castle				56°19′12″N 3°44′33″W	Category C(S)	4558	Upload Photo
Gleneagles House Including Stableblock				56°15′32″N 3°43′44″W	Category B	4546	Upload Photo
Gleneagles Chapel, And Graveyard				56°15′40″N 3°43′43″W	Category B	4547	Upload Photo
Gleneagles Castle				56°15′49″N 3°43′51″W	Category B	4548	Upload Photo
South Lodge, Strathallan Castle				56°18′29″N 3°44′22″W	Category B	4557	Upload Photo
Machany House				56°19′06″N 3°46′37″W	Category B	4566	Upload Photo
Bridge At Knappilands Over Machany Water				56°19′23″N 3°46′49″W	Category C(S)	4569	Upload Photo
Gleneagles Hotel				56°16′59″N 3°45′05″W	Category B	4570	Upload another image
Old Parish Church Of Blackford, Churchyard (Original Section Only) And Gateway				56°15′49″N 3°46′37″W	Category B	4545	Upload Photo
Gleneagles Station				56°16′30″N 3°43′52″W	Category B	4571	Upload Photo
Moray Street, Gleneagles Maltings And Brewery				56°15′38″N 3°47′01″W	Category B	4543	Upload Photo
Kennels Cottage, Andrews Wood, Tullibardine				56°18′33″N 3°44′48″W	Category C(S)	4555	Upload Photo
Home Farm, Strathallan Castle				56°19′27″N 3°45′20″W	Category C(S)	4563	Upload Photo
North Lodge Strathallan Castle				56°19′34″N 3°45′07″W	Category B	4564	Upload Photo
Old Parish Church Of Blackford				56°15′50″N 3°46′37″W	Category B	4544	Upload Photo
Kincardine Castle				56°17′02″N 3°41′55″W	Category B	4550	Upload Photo
Kincardine Glen Railway Viaduct Over Ruthven Water				56°17′18″N 3°41′57″W	Category B	4551	Upload Photo
Waulkmill Bridge Over Machany Water				56°19′34″N 3°43′31″W	Category C(S)	4568	Upload Photo
Kincardine Castle Lodge				56°17′29″N 3°41′56″W	Category B	4552	Upload Photo
Tullibardine Collegiate Church				56°18′04″N 3°45′50″W	Category A	4554	Upload Photo
South Hillhead				56°18′53″N 3°46′02″W	Category C(S)	4556	Upload Photo
Strathallan Castle				56°19′10″N 3°44′58″W	Category B	4559	Upload Photo
Strathallan Castle, Bridge On North Drive Over Machany Water				56°19′24″N 3°44′48″W	Category B	4562	Upload Photo
Tullibardine Cottage				56°17′10″N 3°44′43″W	Category C(S)	4553	Upload Photo
Strathallan Castle, Walled Garden				56°19′10″N 3°45′22″W	Category C(S)	4561	Upload Photo
Crosshill House				56°19′27″N 3°45′30″W	Category B	4565	Upload Photo
Earnbank, Kinkell Bridge				56°19′47″N 3°43′48″W	Category B	4567	Upload Photo
Strathallan Castle Stableblock				56°19′13″N 3°44′56″W	Category B	4560	Upload Photo

== Key ==
The scheme for classifying buildings in Scotland is:

- Category A: "buildings of national or international importance, either architectural or historic; or fine, little-altered examples of some particular period, style or building type."
- Category B: "buildings of regional or more than local importance; or major examples of some particular period, style or building type, which may have been altered."
- Category C: "buildings of local importance; lesser examples of any period, style, or building type, as originally constructed or moderately altered; and simple traditional buildings which group well with other listed buildings."

In March 2016 there were 47,288 listed buildings in Scotland. Of these, 8% were Category A, and 50% were Category B, with the remaining 42% being Category C.
