= List of listed buildings in Arngask, Perth and Kinross =

This is a list of listed buildings in the parish of Arngask in Perth and Kinross, Scotland.

== List ==
Name	Location	Date Listed	Grid Ref. (Note: Sometimes known as OSGB36, the grid reference (where provided) is based on the British national grid reference system used by the Ordnance Survey. • "Guide to National Grid". Ordnance Survey. • "Get-a-map". Ordnance Survey.)	Geo-coordinates	Notes	LB Number (Note: Historic Environment Scotland assign a unique alphanumeric identifier to each designated site in Scotland, for listed buildings this always begins with "LB", for example "LB12345".)	Image
The Bridge House And Steading Glenfarg Village				56°16′46″N 3°24′06″W	Category C(S)	5834	Upload Photo
Millruce, Glenfarg Village				56°16′45″N 3°24′04″W	Category C(S)	5692	Upload Photo
Byre Building At Cottage, Abbots Deuglie. (Old Abbot's Deuglie House)				56°16′58″N 3°25′34″W	Category B	5697	Upload Photo
Langside				56°15′50″N 3°25′08″W	Category C(S)	5702	Upload Photo
Glenfarg, Main Street, Old Toll Cottage				56°16′44″N 3°23′54″W	Category C(S)	5833	Upload Photo
Arngask Old Manse Glenfarg				56°16′49″N 3°23′59″W	Category C(S)	5829	Upload Photo
Glenfarg Old Bridge Over River Farg				56°16′44″N 3°24′05″W	Category C(S)	5832	Upload Photo
Glendy Mill Bridge				56°16′22″N 3°24′55″W	Category C(S)	6668	Upload Photo
Old Parish Church Of Arngask, Churchyard				56°16′57″N 3°23′29″W	Category C(S)	5828	Upload Photo
New Fargie. Garage And Stable Block				56°17′50″N 3°21′50″W	Category B	5699	Upload Photo
Arngask Parish Church Glenfarg				56°16′42″N 3°24′09″W	Category B	5830	Upload Photo
Arngask Farm				56°16′48″N 3°23′33″W	Category C(S)	5694	Upload Photo
Blairstruie House				56°18′22″N 3°23′35″W	Category B	5695	Upload Photo
Dairyman's House Newton Of Balcanquhal ("Mission Hall" On Map)				56°16′49″N 3°21′44″W	Category B	5700	Upload Photo
Duncrievie Cottage With Boundary Walls				56°16′07″N 3°23′38″W	Category C(S)	46406	Upload Photo
Fordel House				56°17′37″N 3°24′21″W	Category B	5696	Upload Photo
Old Parish Church Of Arngask				56°16′58″N 3°23′30″W	Category C(S)	5827	Upload Photo
Ruins Of Old House Of Fordel And Outbuildings, Easter Fordel				56°17′51″N 3°23′14″W	Category B	5698	Upload Photo
Arngask Library (Corbett Institute Glenfarg				56°16′47″N 3°24′03″W	Category B	5831	Upload Photo
Arngask House				56°16′51″N 3°23′29″W	Category C(S)	5693	Upload Photo
Rose Cottage, Duncrievie				56°16′07″N 3°23′47″W	Category C(S)	5701	Upload Photo

== Key ==
The scheme for classifying buildings in Scotland is:

- Category A: "buildings of national or international importance, either architectural or historic; or fine, little-altered examples of some particular period, style or building type."
- Category B: "buildings of regional or more than local importance; or major examples of some particular period, style or building type, which may have been altered."
- Category C: "buildings of local importance; lesser examples of any period, style, or building type, as originally constructed or moderately altered; and simple traditional buildings which group well with other listed buildings."

In March 2016 there were 47,288 listed buildings in Scotland. Of these, 8% were Category A, and 50% were Category B, with the remaining 42% being Category C.
