= List of listed buildings in Madderty, Perth and Kinross =

This is a list of listed buildings in the parish of Madderty in Perth and Kinross, Scotland.

== List ==
Name	Location	Date Listed	Grid Ref. (Note: Sometimes known as OSGB36, the grid reference (where provided) is based on the British national grid reference system used by the Ordnance Survey. • "Guide to National Grid". Ordnance Survey. • "Get-a-map". Ordnance Survey.)	Geo-coordinates	Notes	LB Number (Note: Historic Environment Scotland assign a unique alphanumeric identifier to each designated site in Scotland, for listed buildings this always begins with "LB", for example "LB12345".)	Image
Parish Church Of Madderty, Session-House, Churchyard				56°22′35″N 3°42′19″W	Category C(S)	17830	Upload Photo
Williamston House				56°22′46″N 3°39′57″W	Category A	17836	Upload Photo
Woodend House				56°22′45″N 3°43′17″W	Category B	17831	Upload Photo
Dollerie House				56°22′01″N 3°46′32″W	Category B	17832	Upload Photo
Dollerie, Witch's Bridge				56°22′00″N 3°46′53″W	Category B	19832	Upload Photo
Parish Church Of Madderty				56°22′34″N 3°42′21″W	Category B	17829	Upload Photo
Dollerie Icehouse				56°22′03″N 3°46′36″W	Category C(S)	17833	Upload Photo
Dollerie House Bridge				56°22′05″N 3°46′34″W	Category C(S)	17834	Upload Photo
Inchaffray Abbey				56°23′00″N 3°41′46″W	Category B	17835	Upload Photo

== Key ==
The scheme for classifying buildings in Scotland is:

- Category A: "buildings of national or international importance, either architectural or historic; or fine, little-altered examples of some particular period, style or building type."
- Category B: "buildings of regional or more than local importance; or major examples of some particular period, style or building type, which may have been altered."
- Category C: "buildings of local importance; lesser examples of any period, style, or building type, as originally constructed or moderately altered; and simple traditional buildings which group well with other listed buildings."

In March 2016 there were 47,288 listed buildings in Scotland. Of these, 8% were Category A, and 50% were Category B, with the remaining 42% being Category C.
