= List of listed buildings in St Madoes, Perth and Kinross =

This is a list of listed buildings in the parish of St Madoes in Perth and Kinross, Scotland.

== List ==
Name	Location	Date Listed	Grid Ref. (Note: Sometimes known as OSGB36, the grid reference (where provided) is based on the British national grid reference system used by the Ordnance Survey. • "Guide to National Grid". Ordnance Survey. • "Get-a-map". Ordnance Survey.)	Geo-coordinates	Notes	LB Number (Note: Historic Environment Scotland assign a unique alphanumeric identifier to each designated site in Scotland, for listed buildings this always begins with "LB", for example "LB12345".)	Image
Inchyra House Lodge				56°22′28″N 3°19′00″W	Category B	19808	Upload another image
Churchyard				56°22′34″N 3°18′07″W	Category C(S)	17622	Upload Photo
Pitfour Castle				56°22′24″N 3°17′52″W	Category A	17628	Upload Photo
Manse Of St. Madoes				56°22′37″N 3°18′03″W	Category B	17623	Upload Photo
Lodge, Pitfour Castle				56°22′32″N 3°17′58″W	Category C(S)	17629	Upload Photo
Parish Church				56°22′35″N 3°18′09″W	Category B	17620	Upload Photo
Cairnie, Farmhouse				56°22′11″N 3°18′09″W	Category C(S)	17626	Upload Photo
Inchyra House With Court Of Offices At Rear				56°22′38″N 3°18′45″W	Category A	17624	Upload another image
Upper Mains, Pitfour Dovecot				56°22′25″N 3°17′37″W	Category B	17630	Upload Photo
Inchyra House Walled Garden				56°22′36″N 3°19′10″W	Category C(S)	17625	Upload another image
Cottown, Former School And Schoolhouse				56°22′29″N 3°17′15″W	Category A	19809	Upload Photo
Mrs. Reid, Cottage (Unoccupied) And Shed At Rear Of				56°22′31″N 3°18′12″W	Category C(S)	17631	Upload Photo

== Key ==
The scheme for classifying buildings in Scotland is:

- Category A: "buildings of national or international importance, either architectural or historic; or fine, little-altered examples of some particular period, style or building type."
- Category B: "buildings of regional or more than local importance; or major examples of some particular period, style or building type, which may have been altered."
- Category C: "buildings of local importance; lesser examples of any period, style, or building type, as originally constructed or moderately altered; and simple traditional buildings which group well with other listed buildings."

In March 2016 there were 47,288 listed buildings in Scotland. Of these, 8% were Category A, and 50% were Category B, with the remaining 42% being Category C.
