= Clan Oliphant =

Highland Scottish clan

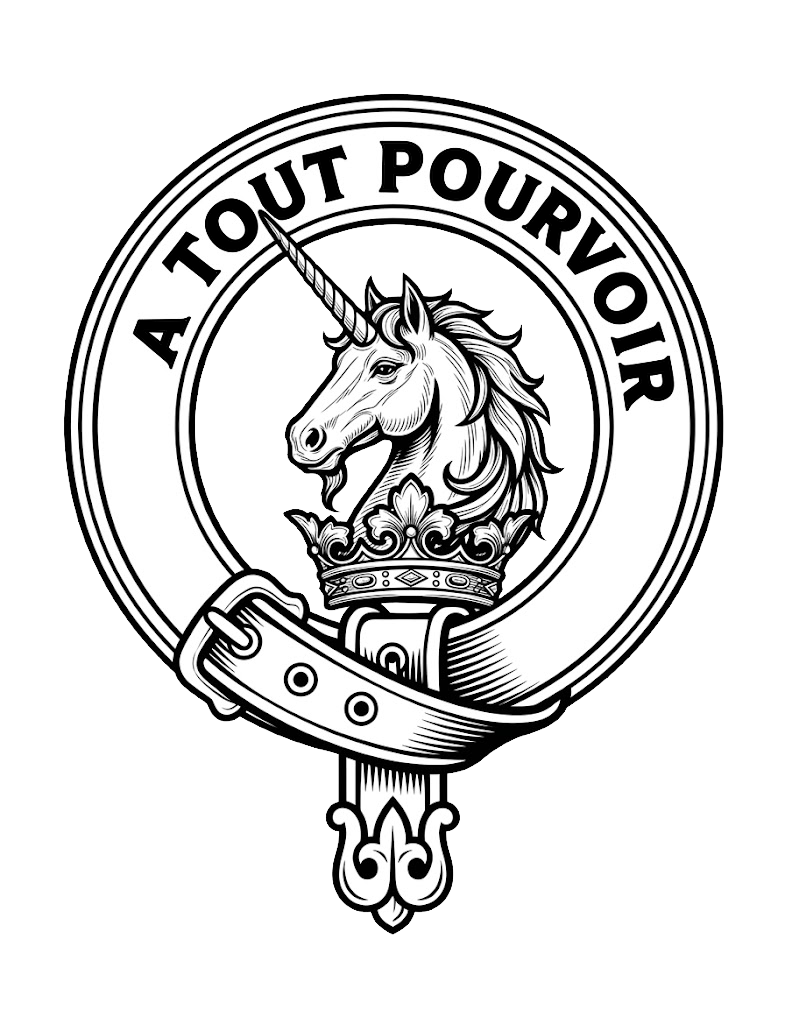
- Crest: "From a crest coronet Or, a unicorn’s head couped Argent and crined and armed Or."
- Motto: Tout Pourvoir (From French: Provide for All)

Chief
- Richard Eric Laurence Oliphant of that Ilk
- Chief of the Name and Arms of Oliphant
- Seat: None
- Historic seat: Aberdalgie, Dupplin Castle and Kellie Castle
Clan branches
Oliphant of Oliphant
Oliphant of Bachilton
Oliphant of Condie
Oliphant of Rossie
Oliphant of Gask
Oliphant of Kellie
Allied clans
Clan Ogilvy
Rival clans
Clan Lindsay

Clan Oliphant is a Highland Scottish clan.

== History ==
=== Origins of the clan ===
Although this remains the subject of ongoing research, the earliest member of this Clan known to date is Roger Olifard, who witnessed a foundation charter to the Clunic priory of St. Andrew's, Northampton, by Earl Simon. The Charter was dated between 1093 and 1100 and Roger himself made a grant of 3 shillings yearly to this priory.

One theory claims that Oliphants were of French origin who by the twelfth century held lands around Northamptonshire in England. In Domesday, Northamptonshire, there is a mention of "In Lilleford, Willelmus Olyfart", which land was held of the Countess Judith. Also in the Pipe Roll, 31 Hen. I is mention of a William Olifard of Northamptonshire as well as a Hugh Olifard of Huntingdonshire. William held five hides in Lilford (Lilleford) of the fee of the King of Scotland while Hugh Olifard of Stokes was a knight in the service of the Abbot of Petersborough before 1120; both appear in the pipe roll of 1130.

Maybe the progenitor of the Olifard family was "David Holyfard", godson of King David I of Scotland and in 1141 his protector; who was also in possession of Lilford (Lilleford) in Northamptonshire, showing the Northamptonshire family connection to Scotland. David was a son of William Olifard, mentioned in the pipe rolls of Cambridgeshire (1158), Northamptonshire (1163) and Huntingdonshire (1168 and 1169). He saved his godfather, David I of Scotland, from capture during the Battle of Winchester in 1141. David held the lands of Crailing and Smailholm, both in Roxburghshire, and served as the Justiciar of Lothian. He is not mentioned in records after 1170 and is supposed to have died shortly thereafter. One of David's sons was sent as a hostage for William the Lion.

David Olifard's son Sir Walter Olifard, the second Justiciar, in 1173 married Christian, the daughter of Ferchar, Earl of Strathearn; her dowry was the lands of Strageath.

=== Wars of Scottish Independence ===
The Oliphant name appears on the Ragman Rolls of 1296 submitting to Edward I of England. However, like most of the Scots forced to swear fealty to the English king, the Oliphants soon took up the cause of Scottish independence.

During the Wars of Scottish Independence Sir William Oliphant fought at the Battle of Dunbar (1296) and was captured and imprisoned at Devizes in England. He was released and appointed Constable of Stirling Castle. In 1304 Stirling was the final stronghold remaining in Scots hands. King Edward I of England laid siege to the castle for three months before they surrendered. Sir William was again captured and sent to the Tower of London. He was later released and appointed Governor of Perth by King Edward II of England. Perth was subsequently captured by King Robert the Bruce and Sir William was sent in chains to the Western Isles where it is presumed he died. There is no further mention of him in any records.

His cousin, whom he is sometimes confused with, William Oliphant, Lord of Aberdalgie also fought at the battle of Dunbar and was also captured and was sent to Rochester Castle where he was held, being released only after agreeing to serve King Edward I of England overseas. He returned to Scotland where he was second in command of Stirling Castle under his cousin, Sir William Oliphant. He was captured once again, this time being imprisoned at Wallingford Castle. Sir William was released at least by 1313 and served the Bruce in the continued struggle to defeat the English. He was one of the signatories to the Declaration of Arbroath on 6 April 1320 and his seal is still visible. He was subsequently rewarded with land at Gallery in Angus, Gask and Newtyle both in Perthshire. He was also given the lands of Muirhouse near Edinburgh in compensation for lands taken by King John de Balliol in Kincardineshire.

Sir Walter Oliphant, Lord of Aberdalgie and son of Sir William, married Princess Elizabeth, the youngest daughter of King Robert the Bruce. By 1364 Sir Walter held lands of Kellie and, those of Gask Aberdalgie and Dupplin in free barony.

Sir John Oliphant, Lord of Aberdalgie, was son of Sir Walter and succeeded his father. He had a charter from King Robert II for all of his father's lands held from the crown on 10 December 1388. Sir John had four brothers: Firstly, Sir Walter, 1st of Kellie, to whom his father conveyed the lands of Kellie and Pitkeirrie, both in the sheriffdom of Fife, which was confirmed by Robert II. on 20 October 1379; Secondly, Malcolm Oliphant, who had a charter from his brother, Sir John Oliphant, for the lands of Hazelhead dated 13 January 1412 and as these lands reverted to the senior line in future years, it is evident that he either d. without issue or else any issue had extinguished; Thirdly, William Oliphant who, in spite of their being second cousin to the King, was executed with his younger brother Arthur at Perth in 1413/1414 for complicity in the murder of Patrick, Earl of Strathearn, in 1413; Fourthly, Arthur Oliphant.

=== 15th century and clan conflicts ===
Sir William Oliphant, Lord of Aberdalgie succeeded his father in 1417 and was sent to and retained in England as a hostage on the King's release on 28 March 1424. He was released in December 1425 but was dead by 12 August 1428.

Sir John Oliphant, Lord of Aberdalgie succeeded his father by 12 August 1428 and was served heir to his grandfather, Sir John Oliphant, in the lands of Cranshaws in 1441. In 1445, Sir John Oliphant was killed at the Battle of Arbroath, supporting the Clan Ogilvy in a clan battle against the Clan Lindsay.

Sir Laurence Oliphant of Aberdalgie was Sir John's son who succeeded his father in 1445 and upon coming of age was created a Lord of Parliament in 1458 by James II of Scotland. He was later keeper of Edinburgh Castle. He died soon after attending a session of the Lords Auditors on 1 February 1498/99.

=== 16th century and Anglo-Scottish wars ===
During the Anglo-Scottish Wars, Sir Laurence Oliphant's grandson was killed at the Battle of Flodden in 1513, and his great-grandson was captured at the Battle of Solway Moss in 1542.

The fourth Lord Oliphant supported Mary, Queen of Scots and fought for her at the Battle of Langside in 1568.

The chief's eldest son, another Laurence, was implicated in the conspiracy known as the Ruthven Raid led by the Clan Ruthven, to kidnap the young King James VI of Scotland and was therefore exiled in 1582. The ship in which he and his co-conspirator, the Master of Morton sailed in was lost at sea.

=== 17th century court case and civil war ===
When the 5th Lord Oliphant died leaving a daughter but no son, the daughter's husband, a Douglas and brother of the Earl of Angus, claimed the Oliphant peerage in the female line. In court, Charles I of England created a new title of Lord Mordington for the daughter and husband, with the precedency of Lord Oliphant and created a new Lord Oliphant title on the nearest male cousin, Patrick Oliphant.

A number of the main branches of the Clan Oliphant were devoted to the Jacobite cause and Charles Oliphant, the ninth Lord Oliphant fought at the Battle of Killiecrankie in 1689 and was afterwards imprisoned.

=== 18th century and Jacobite risings ===
Patrick Oliphant's son, Charles Oliphant, the ninth Lord Oliphant strongly opposed the Treaty of Union in 1707 and joined his cousin, Oliphant of Gask in the Jacobite rising of 1715. The tenth and last Lord Oliphant played an active role in the Jacobite rising of 1745. After the defeat at the Battle of Culloden he escaped firstly to Sweden and then to France. He was allowed to return to Scotland in 1763 but did not relent his opposition to the Hanoverians.

Carolina Oliphant (Lady Nairne), daughter of the Oliphant Laird of Gask was a renowned Jacobite poet.

=== Modern times ===
==== Clan Chief ====
- Clan Chief: Richard Eric Laurence Oliphant of that Ilk, was decreed on 12 June 2003 Chief of the Name and Arms of Oliphant by the Lord Lyon King of Arms and as heir male of the first Lord Oliphant thus to all three creations of Lord Oliphant including to those of the second creation of 2 June 1633, Lord Aberdalgy and Lord Duplin created before 1460, as well as to the subsequent Jacobite peerage, created by Prince Charles Edward Stuart on 14 July 1760 in Rome for Laurence Oliphant.

==== Clan Chieftains ====
These include:

- OLIPHANT OF BACHILTON, OLIPHANT OF CULTEUCHAR & OLIPHANT OF CARPOW: These three are "in process" of being claimed although David Olyphant of Bachilton is an armigerous "one feather" Chieftain of Bachilton. Bachilton is an early offshoot branch and is most closely linked to the Oliphants of Culteuchar, large landowners in Fife.
- OLIPHANT OF CONDIE: The Clan Chief is Chieftain also of Condie. Scions of this branch include a Rear-Admiral; his brother an Ambassador (Sir Lancelot Oliphant author of "Ambassador in Bonds";) a Chairman of the Honourable East India Company (Lieutenant-Colonel James Oliphant) who was also appointed by Queen Victoria as equerry and guardian to Maharajah Duleep Singh; a Chief Justice of Ceylon (Sir Anthony Oliphant) who, when coffee rust hit that crop, first created and planted a tea estate in the highlands from tea bushes in his garden, which gave rise to the country's tea industry today; two Generals (Sir Laurence James Oliphant); two Scottish MPs and Thomas Oliphant (1799–1873) who wrote the chorale for the wedding of Edward Albert, Prince of Wales, and Princess Alexandra of Denmark (later Edward VII and his consort Queen Alexandra), and also wrote his own interpretation as the first English words to the Christmas carol "Deck the Hall(s) with Boughs of Holly" amateur composer, long time Secretary, then President, of the Madrigal Society and author, inter alia, of A Brief Account of the Madrigal Society, from Its Institution in 1741, up to the Present Period (1835), and La Musa Madrigalesca (1837). Other examples of his compositions appeared in the English Hymnal.
- OLIPHANT OF ROSSIE: John Oliphant of Rossie is Chieftain of this branch which produced Robert Oliphant a Postmaster General for Scotland 1764-1795 who appeared in Charles Lees' renowned 1847 painting "The Golfers" and, more recently, the late Betty Oliphant, co-founder of Canada's National Ballet School;
- OLIPHANT OF GASK: Laurence Kington Blair Oliphant of Ardblair and Gask is Chieftain of the Gask branch and great-grandson of Philip Oliphant Kington. This branch produced Scotland's greatest lady poet, Carolina Oliphant, Lady Nairne. Later descendants through the female line, going by the name of Kington-Blair-Oliphant or Blair-Oliphant, include an Air Vice-Marshal and Richard Blair-Oliphant and one other composer in film and television. Laurence's seat is at Ardblair Castle, a Clan Blair seat inherited by the Gask Oliphants by marriage to a Robertson of Struan. Ardblair contains not only the majority of the Gask Oliphant artifacts and portraits but also the Lords Oliphants' charters and known possessions, so remains hugely important to Clan Oliphant. With his surname including that of Blair, Laurence is also a Chieftain of that Clan, as BLAIR of ARDBLAIR and thereby is Chieftain of the nearby Blairgowrie Games;
- OLIPHANT OF KELLIE: This branch that owned Kellie Castle for 250 years is currently without a chieftain but, produced Margaret Oliphant, the author.
- OLIPHANT OF TATE: This branch that had possession of Silver Castle for more than 150 years but has relocated to Rhode Island and has no notable members.

==== Other branches ====
Other branches of Clan Oliphant exist but as of today they still await rightful claimants for their chieftainly arms and the right to wear one or two eagle's feathers. These have produced a US General, the renowned Australian scientist Sir Mark Oliphant who was involved in the Manhattan Project, his nephew the influential cartoonist, Pat Oliphant and the Globe journalist, Thomas Oliphant.

== Tartan ==
Tartan image	Notes
	Olyfavnt tartan, as published in 1842 in Vestiarium Scoticum.

== Castles and clan seat ==
- Kellie Castle was built and owned by Oliphants from 1360 to 1613.
- Old Wick Castle and Berriedale Castle, held by Clan Sutherland in the 15th century, came to Sir William Oliphant of Berriedale (the progenitor of the Oliphant's of Berriedale) second son of the second Lord Oliphant, by his marriage to Christian, the daughter and heiress of Alexander Sutherland of Duffus in 1497.
- Hatton Castle was built in 1575 by Laurence, the 4th Lord Oliphant and replaced the previous nearby wooden fortalice of Balcraig Castle. Hatton Castle was restored in the 20th century.
- Following the decline in the Oliphant fortunes and the loss of Aberdalgie by the main branch of the family, by the 19th century the estates of Gask in Perthshire, Condie, Rossie also in Perthshire and Kinneddar were those most associated with the Oliphant Clan. Although the land at Gask was held by Oliphants from the mid-14th century and although no Castle was ever built there, it is the site of 'The Auld Hoose' in Carolina Oliphant's song.
- There is no Clan Seat currently but Ardblair Castle, near Blairgowrie in Perthshire is the seat of one of the Clan Chieftains, the Oliphant of Gask. Ardblair contains the largest collection of Oliphant heirlooms and portraits today.

== See also ==
- David Olifard
- Laurence, 1st Lord Oliphant
- Laurence Oliphant, 3rd Lord Oliphant
- Lord Oliphant
- Oliphant (disambiguation)
- William Oliphant, Lord Newton
- William Oliphant, Lord of Aberdalgie
- Margaret Oliphant
- Thomas Oliphant (musician and artist)
- Laurence Oliphant, 8th of Condie
- Sir Anthony Oliphant
- Laurence Oliphant (author)
- Major General Sir Laurence James Oliphant
- James Oliphant
- Sir Lancelot Oliphant
- Laurence Oliphant (Jacobite)
- Findo Gask
- Rob Oliphant
- Scottish clan
- List of Ambassadors from the United Kingdom to Belgium
