= Balcraig Castle =

Coordinates: 56.5522°N 3.1310°W

Balcraig Castle was built on lands given to the Oliphants by King Robert the Bruce circa 1317.

== Location ==
Balcraig Castle stood on the western flank of Hatton Hill about half a mile south of the village of Newtyle, Angus, in the Sidlaw Hills. Today no evidence remains of the structure save an area levelled off in the top left corner of the field in which it once stood. The location was strategic as the castle guarded the route through the Sidlaw Hills at this natural cleft.

== History ==
In 1317, King Robert the Bruce rewarded Sir William Oliphant, Lord of Aberdalgie with a number of grants of land including Gasknes, Newtyle, Kinpurnie, Auchtertyre, Balcrais, Muirhouse and Hazelhead.

It is not known when the castle of Balcraig was constructed but it was superseded in 1575 when Hatton Castle was erected by the 4th Lord Oliphant nearby. The only known representation of Balcraig is in Timothy Pont's map of the area circa 1590, when it was still standing.

It has been suggested that Balcraig was of wooden construction but this is not supported by the fact that a number of boulder stones were ploughed up in the vicinity of the site of the old castle some fifty years ago (circa 1970). The size of the stones suggested that they were the foundations of a stone fortalice. There is also a diary record of the blowing up of the castle at Newtyle. Hatton Castle, although ruinous until it was restored in the 1980s, was still standing, rather, it had had some major repairs by its owners. The Ordnance Gazetteer of Scotland states that: "The ruins of Hatton Castle and the scanty vestiges of Balcraig have both been separately noticed". Since a wooden structure would not have survived from 1317 to 1884, the "scanty vestiges" visible must have been stone.
