= William Oliphant =

William Oliphant may refer to:

- William Oliphant (died after 1313), Governor of Stirling Castle during the Wars of Scottish Independence
- William Oliphant, Lord of Aberdalgie (died 1329), Scottish knight during the Wars of Scottish Independence
- William Oliphant, Lord Newton (1551–1628), Scottish judge
- William Oliphant, Sr. (1893–1947), founder of Oliphant's Gym, believed to be the oldest gym in North America
- William J. Oliphant (1845–1930), American photographer
