= Balkello Hill =

- Location within Scotland

Highest point
- Elevation: 395 m (1,296 ft)
- Coordinates: 56°32′35″N 3°02′20″W

Geography
- Location: Angus, Scotland
- Parent range: Sidlaw Hills
- Topo map: OS Landranger 53

Climbing
- Easiest route: Walk on path to summit

Balkello Hill is a hill in Angus, Scotland. It is the third highest hill of the Sidlaw range and is visible from Sidlaws View Trail. Balkello Hill is located near Auchterhouse and is smaller than both Auchterhouse Hill and Craigowl Hill.
