= Gask Hill =

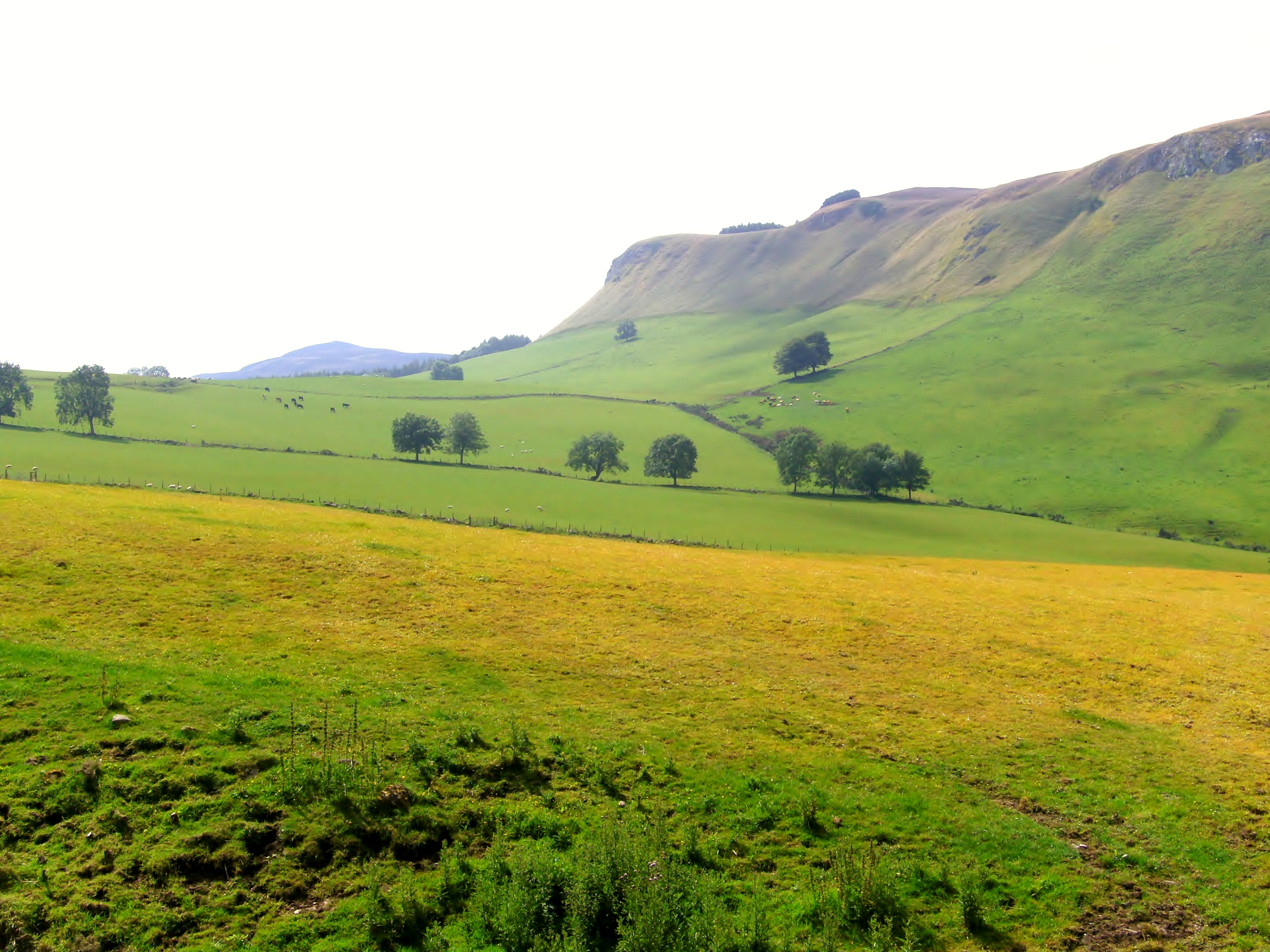

Highest point
- Elevation: 358 m (1,175 ft)
- Coordinates: 56°29′45″N 3°14′17″W

Geography
- Location: Perth & Kinross, Scotland
- Parent range: Sidlaw Hills
- Topo map: OS Landranger 53

Climbing
- Easiest route: Walk along ridge up a vehicular track

Gask Hill is a hill located on the Sidlaw range in south east Perthshire, Scotland. Gask Hill is located near Coupar Angus and is seen easily from the roadside. It lies between Northballo Hill to the northeast and its parent peak King's Seat to the southwest.
