= Balbeuchly (Foot) railway station =

Disused railway station in Auchterhouse, Angus

Coordinates: 56.509031°N 3.042497°W

Balbeuchly (Foot)

General information
- Location: Auchterhouse, Angus; Scotland

Other information
- Status: Disused

History
- Original company: Dundee and Newtyle Railway

Key dates
- 16 December 1831: Opened
- March 1853: Closed temporarily
- July 1854: Reopened
- July 1855: Closed permanently
Location

Balbeuchly (Foot) railway station served the village of Auchterhouse, Angus, Scotland, from 1831 to 1855 on the Dundee and Newtyle Railway.

== History ==
The station was opened on 16 December 1831 by the Dundee and Newtyle Railway. It closed in March 1853 but reopened in July 1854, only to close again in July 1855.

Preceding station	Historical railways	Following station
Balbeuchly (Top); Line and station closed	Dundee and Newtyle Railway	Baldragon; Line and station closed
