= Kinpurnie Castle =

Stately home in Angus, Scotland

Coordinates: 56.5514°N 3.1652°W

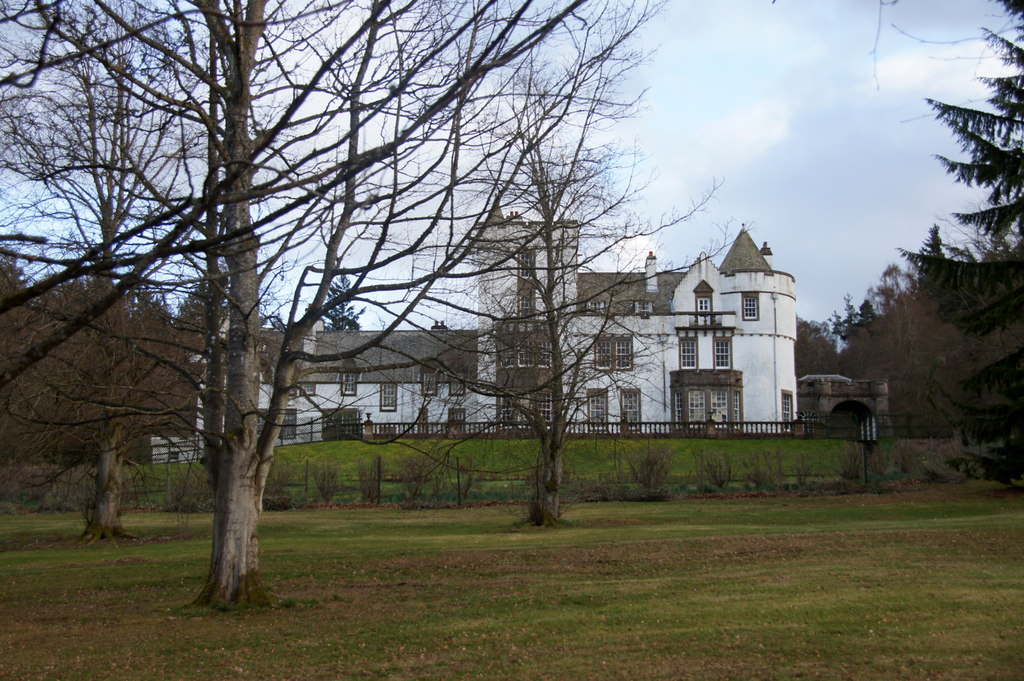
Kinpurnie Castle

Kinpurnie Castle is a stately home located 12 miles (19 km) west of Dundee, close to Newtyle, near Blairgowrie, Angus in Scotland.

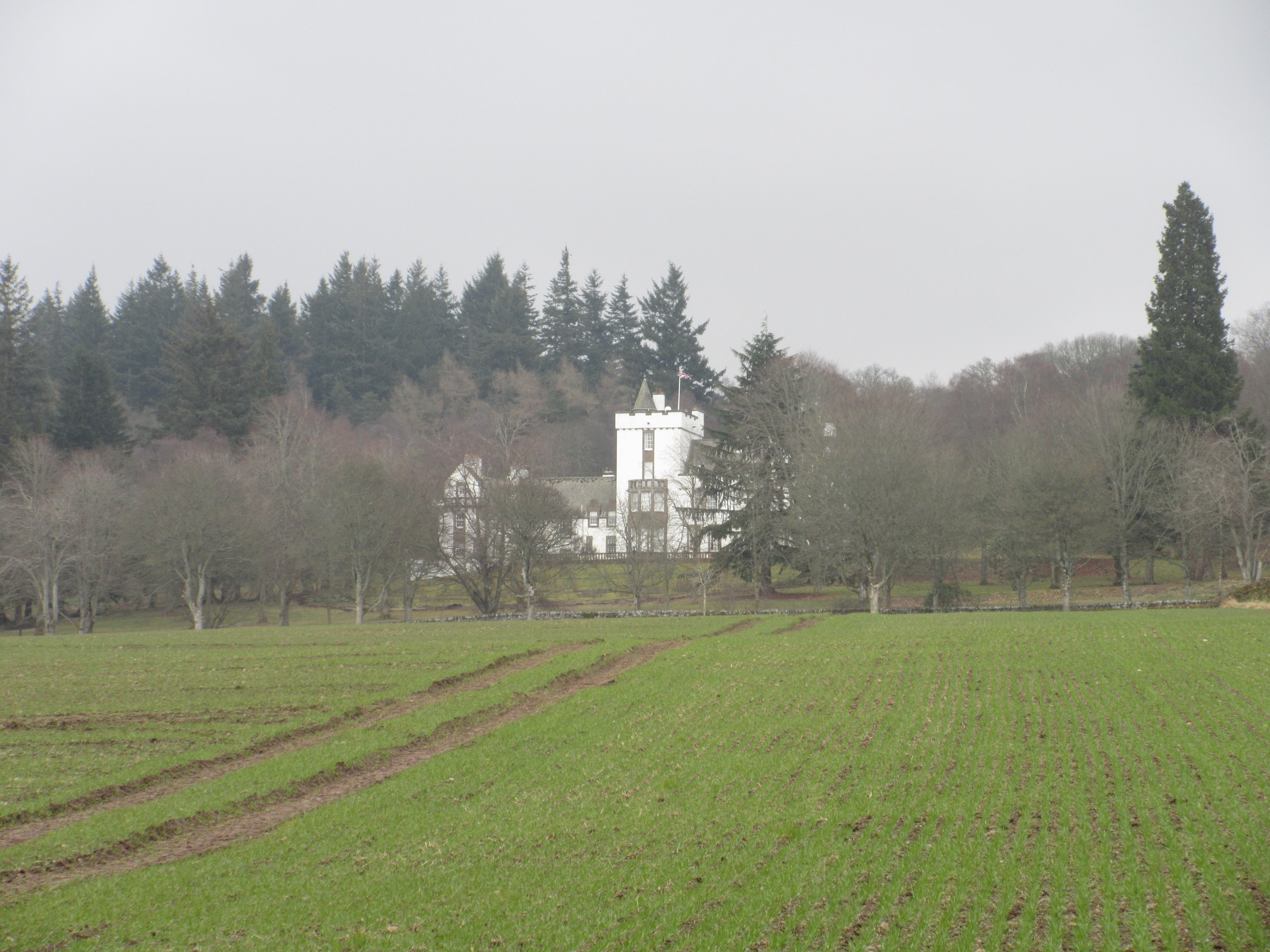
Kinpurnie Castle

The Kinpurnie estate was historically a property owned by William Oliphant, Lord of Aberdalgie by grant from King Robert the Bruce in 1317. It was later owned by James Stuart-Mackenzie, who built an observatory on Kinpurnie Hill.

Kinpurnie was one of the estates purchased by shipping magnate Sir Charles Cayzer for his sons. He acquired it from the Earl of Wharncliffe’s trustees. Various ships of the Cayzer's Castle line were named after the Kinpurnie Castle. (This is incorrect, the Castle line was owned by Sir Donald Currie. There is however a connection as in 1956 the Cayzer's Clan Line merged with Union-Castle Line to form The British & Commonwealth Shipping Company, of which Sir Nicholas Cayzer was chairman)

Kinpurnie Castle was built in 1907, in the Scots baronial style. It was designed by architect Patrick Thoms, of Thoms and Wilkie of Dundee, who trained with Charles Ower. The chimneypiece in the drawing room came from Ralston House. Ornamental plasterwork was done by the Bromsgrove Guild, and oak panelling by Methven, Hyslop & Co of Dundee. The estate also includes Thriepley House.

In 2012, following the death of Sir James Cayzer, the estate was put up for sale. The castle was inherited by Sir James’ heir, Lord Rotherwick and sold in July 2015 for £2.09 million.
