= Balbeuchly (Top) railway station =

Disused railway station in Auchterhouse, Angus

Coordinates: 56.524193°N 3.046077°W

Balbeuchly (Top)

General information
- Location: Auchterhouse, Angus; Scotland

Other information
- Status: Disused

History
- Original company: Dundee and Newtyle Railway

Key dates
- 16 December 1831: Opened
- July 1861: Closed permanently
Location

Balbeuchly (Top) railway station served the village of Auchterhouse, Angus, Scotland, from 1831 to 1861 on the Dundee and Newtyle Railway.

== History ==
The station opened on 16 December 1831 by the Dundee and Newtyle Railway. It closed on 16 October 1860.

Preceding station	Historical railways	Following station
Auchterhouse; Line and station closed	Dundee and Newtyle Railway	Balbeuchly (Foot); Line and station closed
