= Auchterhouse Hill =

Hill in Angus, Scotland

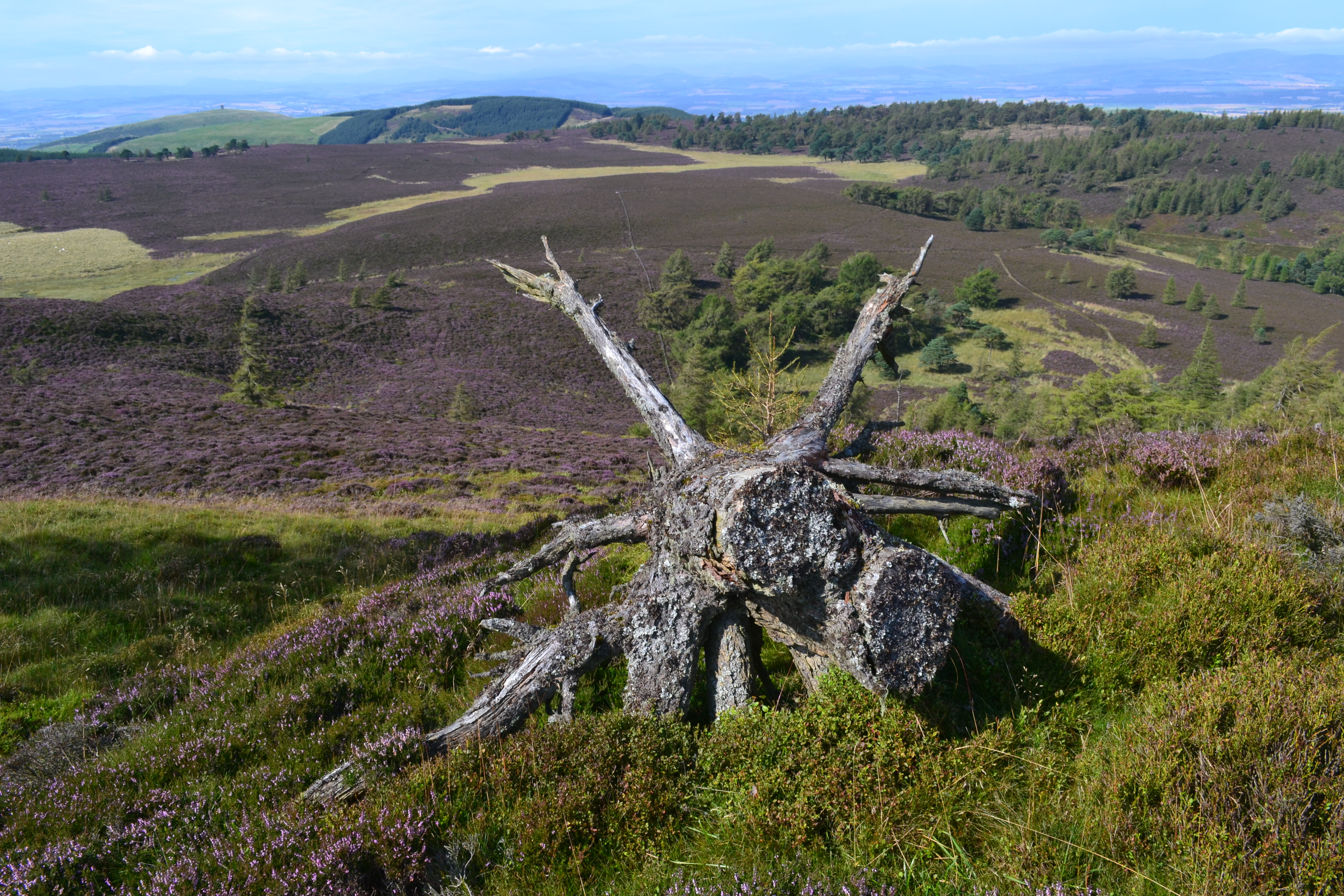

Highest point
- Elevation: 426 m (1,398 ft)
- Coordinates: 56°32′41″N 3°03′08″W

Geography
- Location within Scotland
- Location: Angus, Scotland
- Parent range: Sidlaws
- Topo map: OS Landranger 53

Climbing
- Easiest route: Walk on path to summit

Auchterhouse Hill is the second highest hill of the Sidlaw range in South East Angus. At 426 metres (1,398 ft), it is classified as a Tump with a relative height of 81 m (266 ft). Auchterhouse Hill is located near Auchterhouse and is higher than Balkello Hill and is smaller than nearby Craigowl Hill. There is an ancient hill fort on the summit. It is also a biological Site of Special Scientific Interest.

The annual Auchterhouse Hill Race takes place in March.
