= Baldovan railway station =

Disused railway station in Angus, Scotland

Coordinates: 56.491933°N 2.997238°W

Baldovan
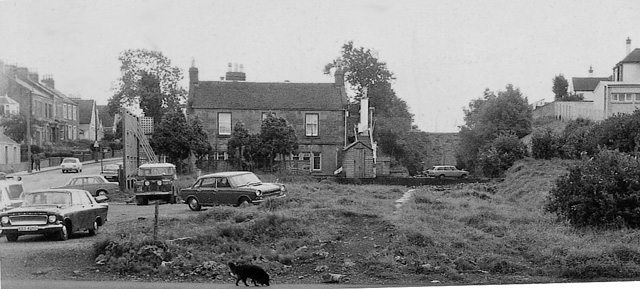
- Site of Baldovan railway station in 1974

General information
- Location: Angus; Scotland
- Platforms: 1

Other information
- Status: Disused

History
- Original company: Dundee and Newtyle Railway
- Pre-grouping: Caledonian Railway
- Post-grouping: London Midland and Scottish Railway

Key dates
- 16 December 1831: Station opens as Baldovan
- 1 September 1905: Station renamed Baldovan and Downfield
- 10 January 1955: Station closes
Location

Baldovan railway station, later renamed Baldovan and Downfield, served the northern suburbs of Dundee around Strathmartine, including Bridgefoot, Downfield and Baldovan, in the Scottish county of Angus. Services were provided by the Dundee and Newtyle Railway.

== History ==
Opened by the Dundee and Newtyle Railway and absorbed into the Caledonian Railway, it became part of the London, Midland and Scottish Railway during the Grouping of 1923. Passing on to the Scottish Region of British Railways on nationalisation in 1948, it was then closed by the British Transport Commission.

== The site today ==
The site today has been redeveloped as housing, with the address Hillview Terrace. The former railway line can be seen on aerial views of the site.

Preceding station	Historical railways	Following station
Lochee	Caledonian Railway; Dundee and Newtyle Railway	Baldragon
