= List of listed buildings in Blairgowrie, Perth and Kinross =

This is a list of listed buildings in the parish of Blairgowrie, Kinross in Perth and Kinross, Scotland.

== List ==
Name	Location	Date Listed	Grid Ref. (Note: Sometimes known as OSGB36, the grid reference (where provided) is based on the British national grid reference system used by the Ordnance Survey. • "Guide to National Grid". Ordnance Survey. • "Get-a-map". Ordnance Survey.)	Geo-coordinates	Notes	LB Number (Note: Historic Environment Scotland assign a unique alphanumeric identifier to each designated site in Scotland, for listed buildings this always begins with "LB", for example "LB12345".)	Image
Ardblair Castle Including Sundials And Garden Statuary				56°35′07″N 3°21′48″W	Category A	5677	Upload another image See more images
Oakbank House				56°36′01″N 3°20′41″W	Category B	5680	Upload Photo
Rosemount, Woodlands Road, The Shian Including Gate				56°34′26″N 3°19′38″W	Category B	51642	Upload Photo
Druidsmere House Gatelodge				56°34′19″N 3°20′50″W	Category B	6382	Upload Photo
Druidsmere House				56°34′15″N 3°20′59″W	Category B	6378	Upload Photo
Strone Bridge Over Black Water				56°39′11″N 3°23′53″W	Category B	5668	Upload Photo
Mullion Rosemount				56°34′44″N 3°19′35″W	Category B	5678	Upload Photo
Bridge Of Cally, Cally House, Including Ancillary Buildings				56°39′14″N 3°26′29″W	Category C(S)	45566	Upload Photo
Druidsmere House, Engine House And Kennels				56°34′20″N 3°20′54″W	Category C(S)	6379	Upload Photo
Lornty Bridge Over Lornty Burn				56°36′11″N 3°21′06″W	Category C(S)	5665	Upload Photo
Blackcraig Lodge And Gatepiers				56°39′59″N 3°27′09″W	Category B	5669	Upload Photo
Cottages (2) Hillside, Netherton				56°39′14″N 3°23′44″W	Category C(S)	5673	Upload Photo
Lornty House				56°36′12″N 3°21′12″W	Category B	5684	Upload Photo
Blackcraig Lime Kiln				56°39′54″N 3°27′33″W	Category C(S)	71	Upload Photo
Druidsmere House, Gardener's And Gamekeepers Cottages And Walled Garden				56°34′18″N 3°20′56″W	Category B	6380	Upload Photo
Lornty Gate House				56°36′10″N 3°21′06″W	Category B	5681	Upload Photo
Lornty Mill				56°36′12″N 3°21′10″W	Category B	5683	Upload Photo
Netherton Mill				56°39′12″N 3°23′54″W	Category C(S)	70	Upload Photo
Glenericht Lodge And Gates On Blairgowrie - Bridge Of Cally Road				56°38′04″N 3°21′57″W	Category B	5666	Upload Photo
Netherton Church				56°39′13″N 3°23′51″W	Category C(S)	5671	Upload Photo
Blackcraig Bridge Over R. Ericht				56°39′57″N 3°27′23″W	Category A	5674	Upload another image
Bridge Of Cally				56°38′47″N 3°24′16″W	Category B	5667	Upload Photo
The Smithy Netherton				56°39′15″N 3°23′51″W	Category C(S)	5672	Upload Photo
Druidsmere House, Steading				56°34′19″N 3°20′58″W	Category B	6381	Upload Photo
Mill House, Netherton				56°39′11″N 3°23′49″W	Category C(S)	5670	Upload Photo
Blackcraig Walled Garden				56°39′49″N 3°27′25″W	Category B	5676	Upload Photo
Oakbank Mill				56°36′02″N 3°20′32″W	Category B	5679	Upload Photo
Blackcraig House				56°39′51″N 3°27′25″W	Category B	5675	Upload Photo

== Key ==
The scheme for classifying buildings in Scotland is:

- Category A: "buildings of national or international importance, either architectural or historic; or fine, little-altered examples of some particular period, style or building type."
- Category B: "buildings of regional or more than local importance; or major examples of some particular period, style or building type, which may have been altered."
- Category C: "buildings of local importance; lesser examples of any period, style, or building type, as originally constructed or moderately altered; and simple traditional buildings which group well with other listed buildings."

In March 2016 there were 47,288 listed buildings in Scotland. Of these, 8% were Category A, and 50% were Category B, with the remaining 42% being Category C.
