= Dronley railway station =

Disused railway station in Dronley, Angus

Dronley
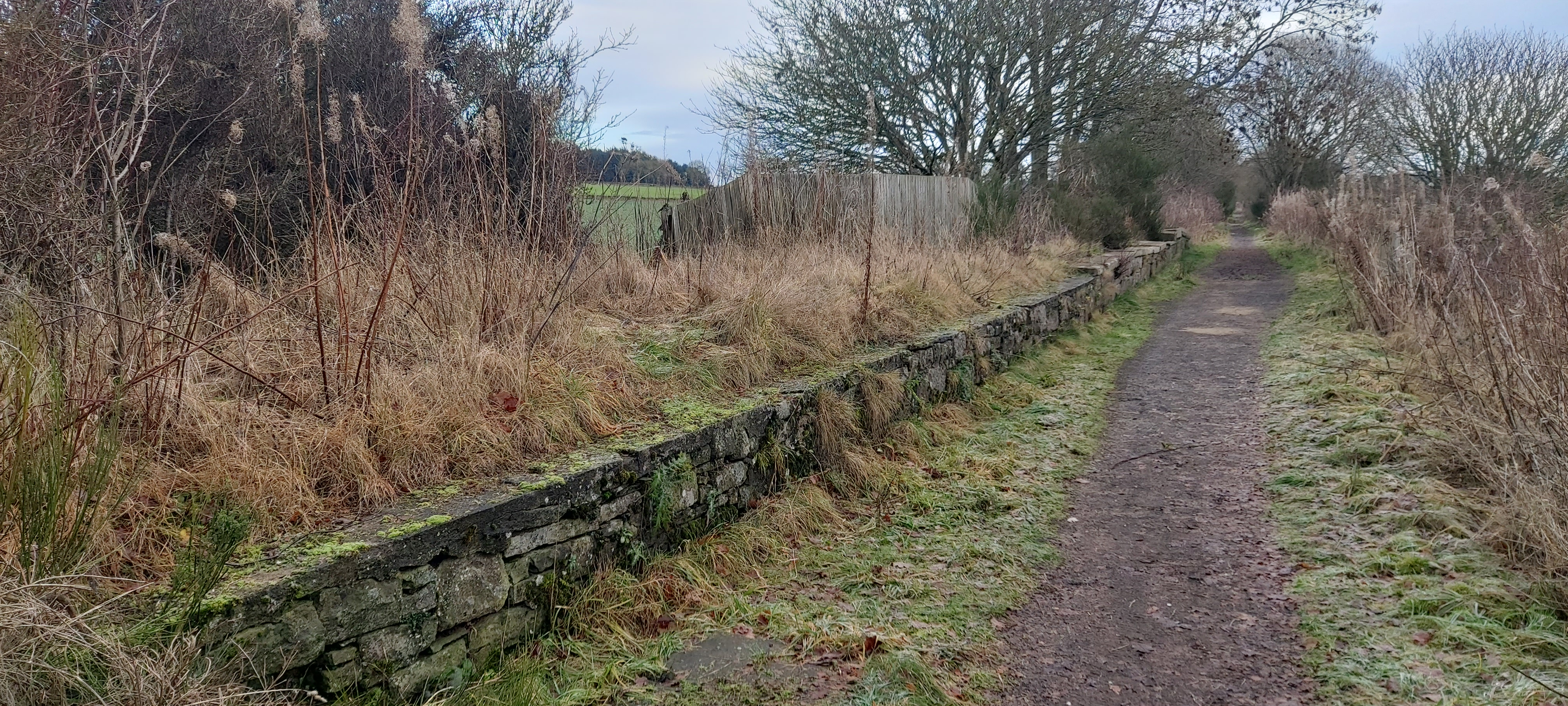
- Dronley railway station in 2022. Dronley Wood can be seen in the distance behind the fence.

General information
- Location: Dronley, Angus; Scotland
- Coordinates: 56°30′40″N 3°04′13″W
- Grid reference: NO342359
- Platforms: 1

Other information
- Status: Disused

History
- Original company: Dundee and Newtyle Railway
- Pre-grouping: Caledonian Railway
- Post-grouping: London, Midland and Scottish Railway

Key dates
- 16 October 1860: Opened
- 10 January 1955: Closed
Location

Dronley railway station served the village of Dronley, Angus, Scotland from 1860 to 1955 on the Dundee and Newtyle Railway.

== History ==
The station opened on 16 October 1860 by the Dundee and Newtyle Railway. The railway also passed through nearby Auchterhouse. There was a goods siding to the west. The station closed to both passengers and goods traffic on 10 January 1955.

Preceding station	Disused railways	Following station
Auchterhouse; Line and station closed	Dundee and Newtyle Railway	Baldragon; Line and station closed
