= Auchterhouse railway station =

Disused railway station in Angus, Scotland

Coordinates: 56.52560°N 3.08615°W

Auchterhouse

General information
- Location: Angus; Scotland
- Platforms: 2

Other information
- Status: Disused

History
- Original company: Dundee and Newtyle Railway
- Pre-grouping: Caledonian Railway
- Post-grouping: London Midland and Scottish Railway

Key dates
- 16 December 1831: First station opened
- 1 November 1860: Replaced with new station on direct line
- 10 January 1955: Closed
Location

Auchterhouse railway station served the village of Auchterhouse in the Scottish county of Angus. Services were provided by the Dundee and Newtyle Railway. The first station of the name had to be moved in 1860 when the line was realigned to avoid an incline.

== History ==
Opened by the Dundee and Newtyle Railway, and absorbed into the Caledonian Railway, it became part of the London, Midland and Scottish Railway during the Grouping of 1923. Passing on to the Scottish Region of British Railways on nationalisation in 1948 who closed it in 1955.

Preceding station	Historical railways	Following station
Dronley	Caledonian Railway; Dundee and Newtyle Railway	Newtyle
