= Hanover Terrace =

Coordinates: 51.52805°N 0.16307°W

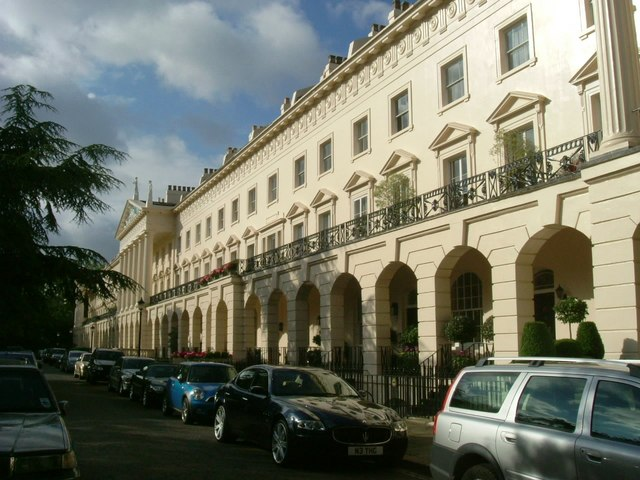
Hanover Terrace, NW1

Hanover Terrace overlooks Regent's Park in City of Westminster, London, England. The terrace is a Grade I listed building.

== History ==
It was designed by John Nash in 1822. It has a centre and two wing buildings, of the Doric order, the acroterion, above which statues and other sculptural decorations of terracotta are erected. The centre building is crowned by a well proportioned pediment, the tympanum of which is embellished with statues and figures. The style of architecture employed by the artist is Italian or Palladian. The capitals are well proportioned in design, and well executed, but the entablature is weak in profile for the height of the building. The stories of the mansions are lofty, and the domestic arrangement of the various rooms convenient. The situation of this terrace is near the northwestern extremity of the western branch of the park's lake.

During the Second World War, the Nash buildings around the park, including Hanover Terrace, fell into what one newspaper called "a sad state of neglect … caused by bombing and the ravages of time". An official report commented "there is not a single terrace which does not give the impression of hopeless dereliction". Restoration work followed in the early 1950s. The terrace was mainly occupied by government departments, during and after the war, but by 1957, the freeholder of the terrace, the Crown Estate, had adopted the policy of returning it, and the other Nash terraces, to private residential use, as recommended ten years earlier in the report of a government committee on the post-war future of the terraces.

There are three blue plaques on houses in the terrace: one at no.10 for Ralph Vaughan Williams, one at no.11 for Anthony Salvin, and one at no.13 for H. G. Wells. Other well-known residents of the terrace included Edmund Gosse, the soldier Sir Alexander Bryce, the dancer Adeline Genée, the shipowner and philanthropist Richard Green, the MP Samuel Gurney, the shipping and aviation magnate Sir Samuel Instone, the publisher Thomas Longman, the missionary Irene Petrie, the racecourse owner Mirabel Topham, the artist Feliks Topolski, the playwright Harold Pinter, the historian Lady Antonia Fraser and the architect Sir Aston Webb.
