= Alexander Bryce (British Army officer) =

British soldier and colonel-commandant

Major-General Sir Alexander Bryce KCH CB
- Born: 23 January 1766
- Died: 4 October 1832 (aged 66); Hanover Terrace, London
- Relatives: Alexander Bryce (father)
- Military career
- Allegiance: United Kingdom
- Branch: British Army
- Service years: 1782–1832
- Rank: Major-General
- Units: Royal Artillery; Royal Engineers
- Commands: Inspector-General of Fortifications
- Conflicts: French Revolutionary Wars; Egypt campaign; Battle of Abukir; Battle of Mandora; Battle of Alexandria; Siege of Alexandria; Napoleonic Wars; Invasion of Naples
- Awards: Companion of the Order of the Bath; Knight Commander of the Royal Guelphic Order; Knight bachelor Order of the Crescent; Order of Saint Ferdinand and of Merit

Major-General Sir Alexander Bryce KCH CB (23 January 1766 – 4 October 1832) was a British soldier and colonel-commandant in the Royal Engineers.

== Life ==
He was born in East Calder manse on 23 January 1766 the son of the polymath, Rev Alexander Bryce and his wife Janet Gillespie daughter of the Provost of Stirling. His twin brother James Bryce became an Edinburgh surgeon. His father became Chaplain in Ordinary to King George III.

Bryce entered the Royal Military Academy, Woolwich, as a cadet on 7 October 1782, and passed out as a second lieutenant, Royal Artillery, on 25 August 1787. In the autumn of that year he was employed with Captain (afterwards Major-general) W. Mudge in carrying out General Roy's system of triangulation for connecting the meridians of Greenwich and Paris, and in the measurement of a base of verification in Romney Marsh, particulars of which will be found in 'Phil. Trans.' 1790.

Bryce was transferred from the royal artillery to the royal engineers in March 1789, and became a captain in the latter corps in 1794. After serving some years in North America and the Mediterranean, he found himself senior engineer officer with the army sent to Egypt under Sir Ralph Abercromby, in which position he was present at the landing, in the battles before Alexandria, and at the surrender of Cairo, and directed the siege operations at Aboukir, Fort Marabout, and Alexandria. For his services in Egypt he received the brevet rank of major and permission to wear the insignia of the Ottoman order of the Crescent.

Subsequently, as colonel, he served some years in Sicily. In the descent on Calabria he commanded a detachment of Sir John Stuart's army that captured Diamante. Bryce was commanding engineer in the expedition to the bay of Naples in 1809 and in the defence of Sicily against Murat (Bunrury, Narrative).

In 1814 he received the rank of brigadier-general, and was appointed president of a commission to report on the restoration of the fortresses in the Netherlands.

He became a major-general in 1825, and in 1829 was appointed inspector-general of fortifications, a post he was holding at the time of his death. Bryce, who was much esteemed in private life as well as professionally, died, after a few hours' illness, at his residence, Hanover Terrace, Regent's Park, on 4 October 1832.
