= Hatton Castle, Angus =

Castle in Angus, Scotland

Coordinates: 56°33′23″N 3°08′15″W

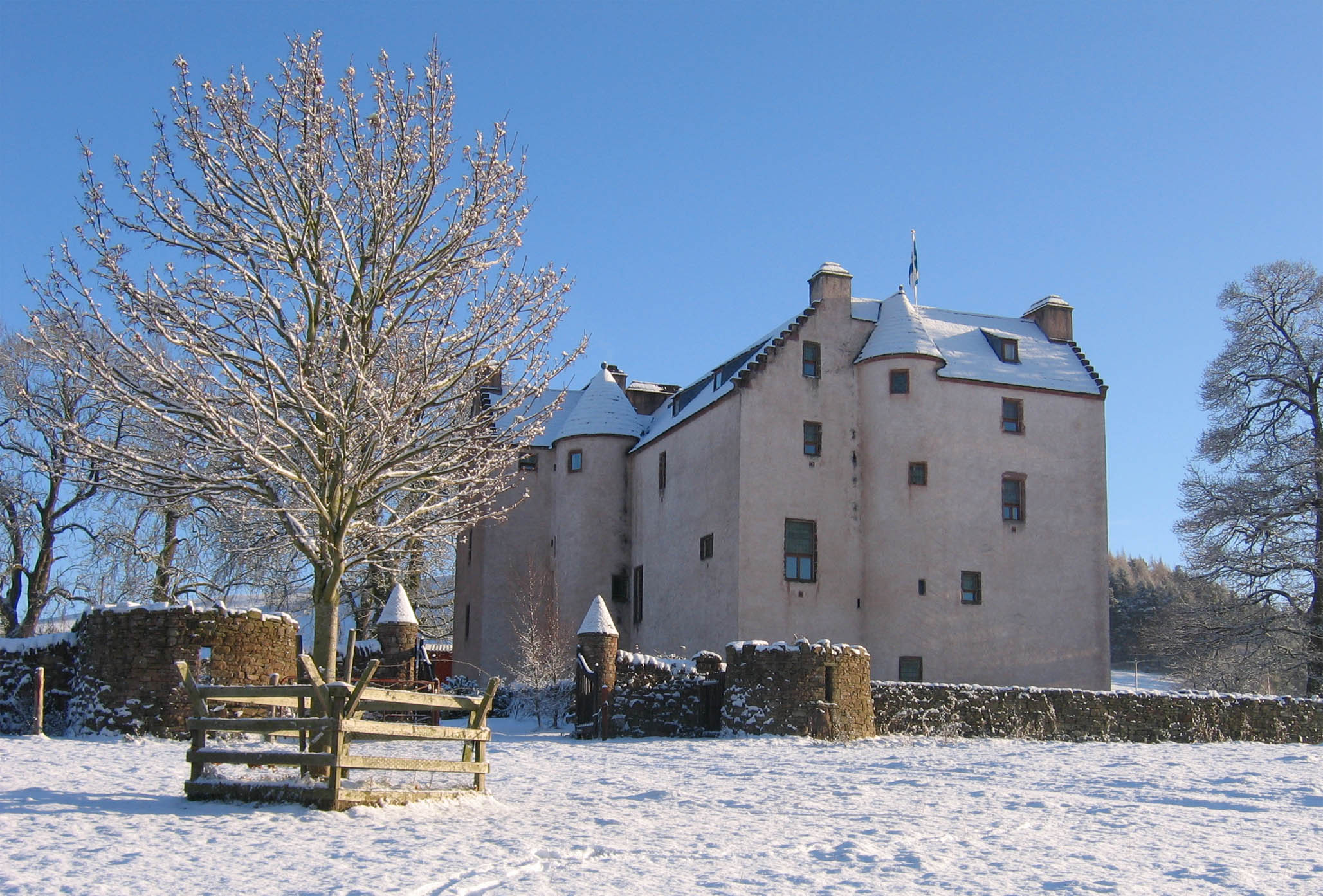
- The castle in 2008
- Interactive map of Hatton Castle, Angus

Hatton Castle stands on the lower part of Hatton Hill, the most easterly of the Sidlaw Hills, to the south of Newtyle in Angus, Scotland. The castle overlooks the wooded Den of Newtyle, and its views extend across Strathmore and include Ben Lawers and Schiehallion as well as the Angus and Glenshee hills. The 16th-century castle was originally built in a typical Scottish "Z plan" tower house design, as a fortified country house or château. There was an earlier castle called Balcraig Castle which stood less than half a mile from the present building, also on Hatton Hill. The building has been designated as a Category B listed building since 11 June 1971.

== Etymology ==
The name "Hatton" was adopted from the farm nearby. "Hatton" is a contraction of Hall-toun, which in Scots means the farm (or ferm toun) near the Hall (or Ha). Thus the Hall must have been there first, and the name "Hatton" actually refers to the adjacent farm, now known as Hatton Farm (the word farm is thus redundant, duplicating toun). Hatton Castle was probably originally called "Newtyle Castle", taking its name from the estate. In Scots, the word tyle means a roofing stone (not restricted to fired clay tiles as in English). There are brick and tile factories on the River Tay near Dundee, but "Newtyle" most likely relates to the sandstone quarried locally, and used extensively for building, dyking and roofing, as well as for carving into Pictish standing stones such as those preserved at the nearby Meigle Sculptured Stone Museum. The name Newtyle rather implies that there was another place where sandstone was quarried previously.

== History ==
The earliest history of the general area demonstrates that Pictish peoples inhabited the area. For example, discovery of the Eassie Stone in this region indicates sophisticated Pictish carvers who embraced Christianity about the year 600 AD.

The lands were given to Sir William Olifard (8th chief) in 1317 by Robert the Bruce. Robert the Bruce's daughter, Elizabeth, married Sir William Olifard's great nephew, Sir Walter Olifaunt, on whom the Newtyle estate was reconfirmed by her brother, David II, by a charter dated 1364. The castle was built in 1575, commissioned by Laurence, fourth Lord Oliphant (1527–1593). Hatton Castle is unusual in that it contains a scale and platt staircase incorporated into its original construction. Such a feature was normally only included in larger constructions. The 4th Lord Oliphant also extended another of his many castles, Kellie Castle in Fife, which bears many similarities.

A variety of people lived in Hatton Castle after the Oliphants, including at least one bishop. It is recorded by Marian McNeill, quoting A. Hislop, Book of Scottish Anecdote, that the old Scots custom of 'enforced hospitality', to extract information from travellers, was demonstrated at Hatton Castle: "The Lords Oliphant used to keep a cannon pointed to the road near by their old castle, so as to compel the wayfarers to come in and be regaled". A cannon is still there today. Hatton was the home of the Masters of Oliphant rather than their fathers, who resided primarily at Aberdalgie and Dupplin Castles.

Hatton Castle was de-roofed in about 1720, after the 1715 Jacobite rising, when it was replaced by the Italian-style Belmont Castle in Meigle, which is now a Church of Scotland residential home. Hatton Castle gradually became encrusted by ivy and a home to pigeons and jackdaws, until it was sold by the Kinpurnie Estate for reconstruction. The restoration was carried out initially by Roderick Oliphant of Oliphant and his elder brother Richard Oliphant of that Ilk, the 34th chief. Much of the castle's character from 1575 has been preserved, including hand-made glass in the leaded windows sourced from Edinburgh. During the reconstruction, under-floor heating was installed to avoid the presence of visible radiators. The exterior is finished with harling using a traditional pinkish lime-based render.

Hatton Castle is now a family home, and the present owners have continued the restoration, aided by specialist castle-restorer Gordon Matthew of Midmar. It still has the strong room which, in ancient times, would have served as a bank for valuables for local people, one of the functions of a Hall. There is a 'priest hole' in what was originally the laird's bedroom. Not so much for priests, one suspects, as for young ladies who might have needed a secret exit route.

Hatton Castle contains a Great Hall measuring approximately 34 × 17 × 17 feet, approaching a double-cube in proportion and noted for its acoustic qualities. In keeping with historical usage, music is regularly performed in the Great Hall. It has served as a meeting place for Scottish traditional musicians and has hosted events associated with the creative network Fiddle Force.

Non-commercial house concerts have been held in the Great Hall, featuring a range of artists. Anne-Marie Forsyth of Auckland has organised annual international Scots fiddle tuition courses at the castle, with tutors including Gregor Borland, Dougie Lawrence and Patsy Reid. In 2007, Hatton Castle hosted the first European performance by a Japanese biwa and chant ensemble, supported by the Scottish harp duo Sìleas.

American cellist Abby Newton, together with David Greenberg, Corrina Kewat, Màiri Campbell, Dave Francis and Scott Petito as the group Ferintosh, recorded the album Castles, Kirks and Caves in the Great Hall. Performances have also taken place in the castle gardens, including productions of Shakespeare’s plays by the pedal-powered HandleBards.

== Gardens ==
No records survive of the original gardens of Hatton Castle, although a house of this scale would likely have had formal gardens in the 16th and 17th centuries. The buildings of Hatton Farm may occupy the site of a former garden south of the castle. Until the 1990s, when the current owner assumed responsibility for the property, Hatton Castle was situated in a gently sloping field used for livestock. Trees were planted in the surrounding parkland by Sir James Cayzer of the neighbouring Kinpurnie Estate. A garden has since been developed, including dry-stone dyking up to three metres high, undertaken by dyker Duncan Armstrong. An orchard of traditional Scottish apple varieties and mulberry trees has been established, and the sunken vegetable garden includes fig trees and artichokes. The eastern boundary of the garden is formed by the Dundee and Newtyle Railway, the first railway line to open in northern Scotland, originally constructed to transport flowers grown in farms around Newtyle to Dundee for shipment to Edinburgh. The former ‘bulb factory’ adjacent to Newtyle station remains in place.

== See also ==
- List of castles in Scotland
- List of castles in Northern Ireland
- List of castles in England
- List of castles in Wales
