= Newtyle Hill =

Coordinates: 56.5463°N 3.1447°W

Newtyle Hill is a mountainous landform in the Sidlaw Hills in Angus, Scotland The vicinity has elements of prehistory including presence of the Eassie Stone, a Pictish stone dating to the Dark Ages.

It is not to be confused with a hill of the same name 2 km east of Dunkeld.

== See also ==
- Hatton Hill
