= Patrick Thoms =

Scottish architect (1873-1946)

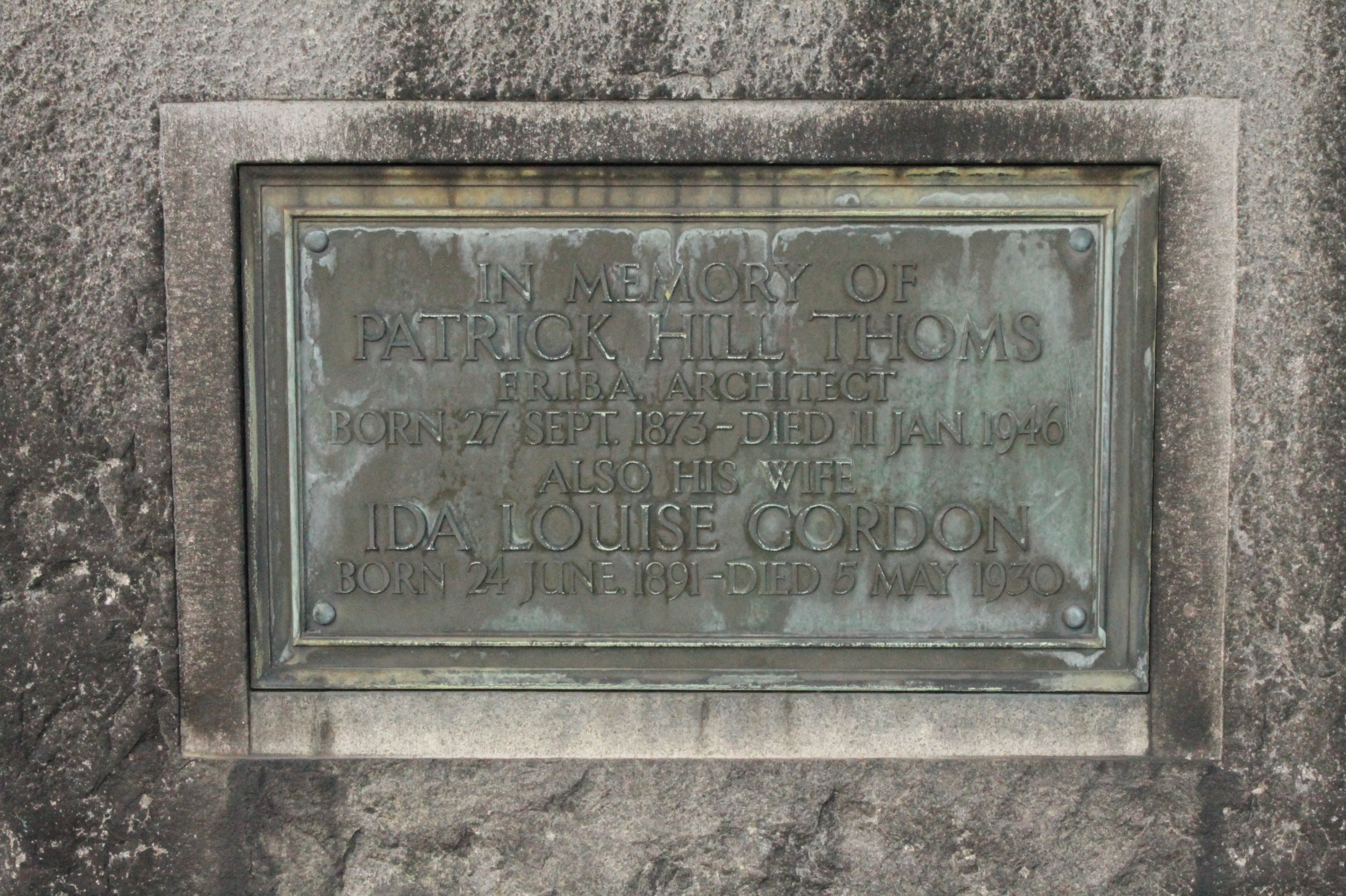
The grave of Patrick Hill Thoms, Western Cemetery, Dundee

Patrick Hill Thoms Friba Arias (1873–1946) was a 20th-century Scottish architect, based in eastern Scotland.

== Life ==
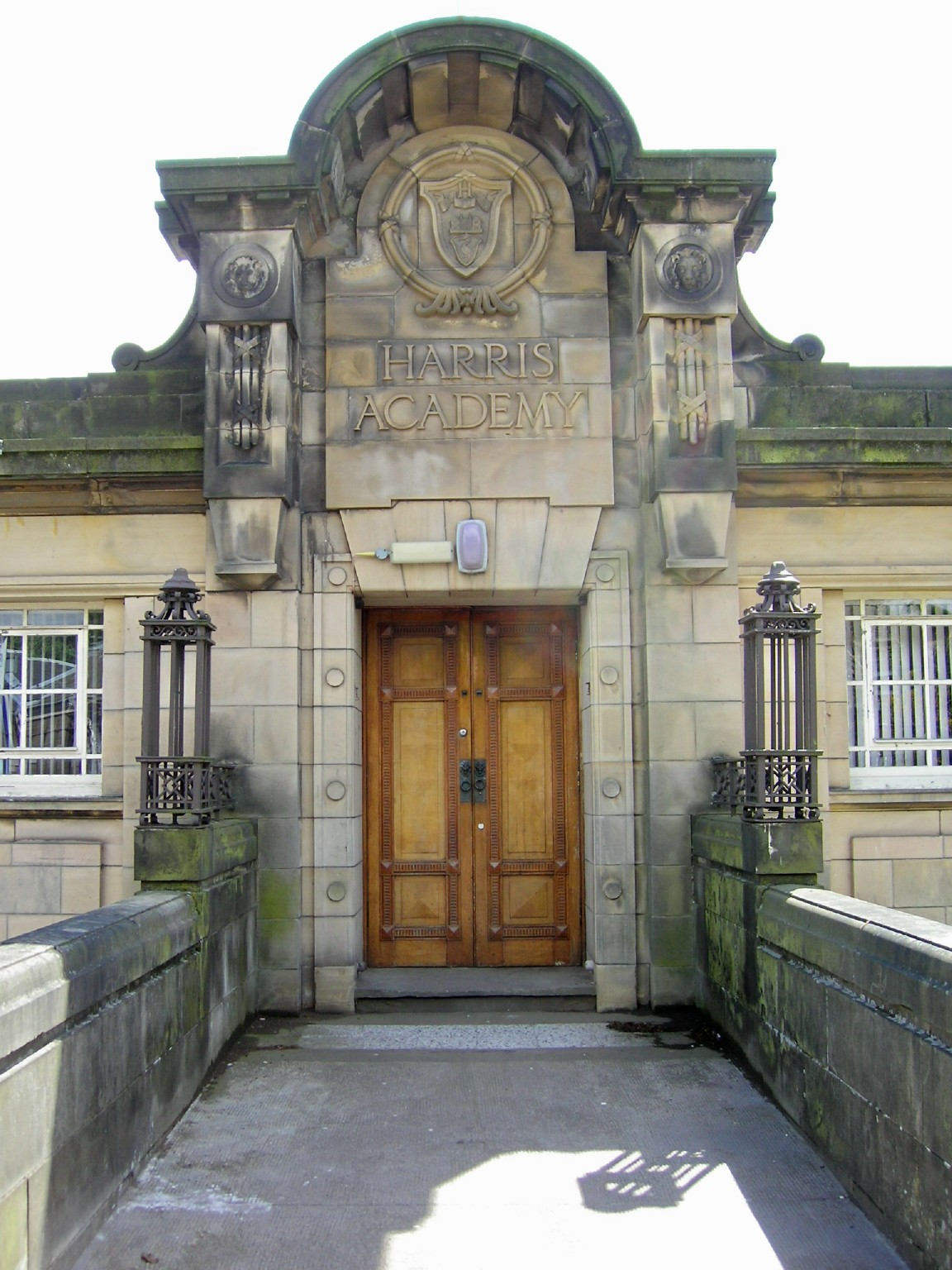
Main entrance Harris Academy

He was born on 27 September 1873 in Kilmacolm the son of Thomas Smith Thoms from a family of Angus farmers and solicitors. He was educated at Harris Academy in Dundee. In 1889 he was articled to Charles Ower to train as an architect in Dundee, also taking formal classes at Dundee Technical Institute and University College Dundee.

After training he joined the office of Thomas Cappon as an architectural assistant, later running his Brechin office. William Gillespie Lamond followed him from Ower's office to Cappon's and was a great influence on his style and development.

In 1898 he began lecturing in Architecture at Dundee Technical Institute and helped to found the Dundee College of Art.

In 1901 he went into partnership with William Fleming Wilkie, setting up office at 18 Commercial Street, Dundee. Quickly flourishing they moved to larger offices at 46 Reform Street in 1904. In 1921 the firm moved to 21 South Tay Street, taking over the offices of the late Cpt. William Walker. Wilkie withdrew from the practice in 1923 and continued alone in St Andrews.

In 1927 he went into a new partnership with Donald Ross, previously his chief assistant, still at the South Tay Street office. In 1934 he formed a new partnership with his nephew, Thomas Thoms.

He died at home, Grey Walls at 452 Perth Road in Dundee on 11 January 1946. He is buried with his wife in the Western Cemetery, Dundee. The grave lies against the second upper terrace, towards the west.

== Family ==
In 1906 he was married to Ida Louise Gordon (1891-1930), eighteen years his junior. Following marriage he moved from Grayburn (which he had built for his father's retiral) to Braefoot in Monifieth. They moved back to Dundee in 1929. They did not have children.

His nephew Thomas Thoms (1908-1987) followed in his footsteps and was trained in his office. Although not immediate, he re-acquired Grey Walls as a family home after Patrick's death. He served as President of the RIAS 1957/8 and 1959/60.

== Main works ==
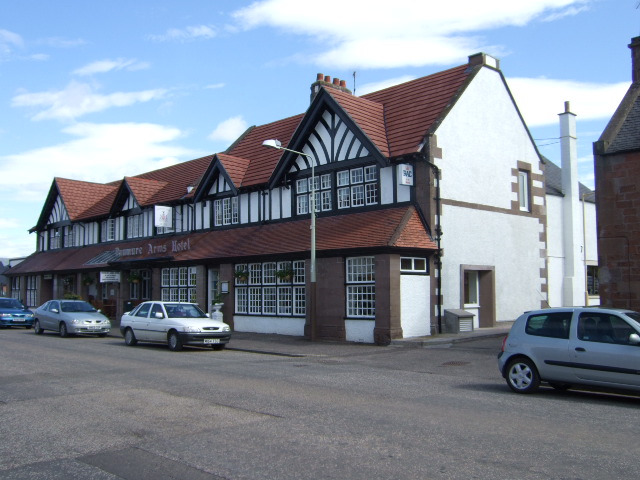
Panmure Arms Hotel

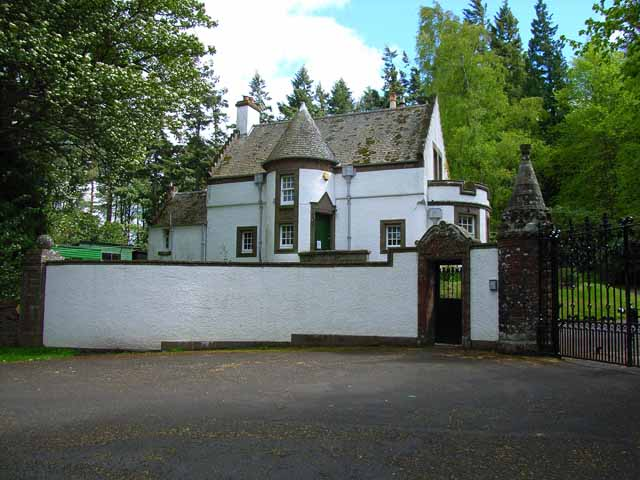
Kinpurnie Castle Lodge

- East Free Church Hall, Brechin (1895)
- Panmure Arms Hotel, Edzell (1895)
- Ramsay Arms Hotel, Fettercairn (1896)
- Brechin Drill Hall (1896)
- Infectious Diseases Hospital, Brechin (1897)
- Edzell United Free Church (1900)
- Clubhouse for the new curling pond at Balruddery House (1901)
- Edzell Parish Church (1902)
- Grange Golf Clubhouse, Monifieth (1902)
- South United Free Church, Kirriemuir (1902)
- Baldragon, Downfield, Dundee (1904)
- Bowling Green Clubhouse, Invergowrie (1904)
- Offices, Monifieth Foundry (1904)
- The Hirsel, Ninewells, Dundee (1904)
- Grayburn House, Benvie, Dundee (1905) for his father - later his own home
- Morar, Ninewells, Dundee (1905)
- UF Church, Newburgh, Fife (1905)
- Kinpurnie Castle and Lodge (1906)
- Nyora, Dundee (1906)
- Major extension to Cupar County Buildings (1907)
- The Elms, Longforgan (1910)
- 1 Hazel Drive, Dundee (1910)
- 1 Lawside Drive, Dundee (1910)
- Westerlea, Longforgan (1910)
- The Boreen, Dundee (1911)
- 4 Farington Street, Dundee (1913)
- Ferncroft, Barnhill, Dundee (1913)
- Fleuchar Craig Works Office, Dundee (1913)
- Scott Street Works, Dundee (1913)
- The Priory, Crail (1915)
- Drumgarth near Dundee (1916)
- War Memorial for 4th Battalion Black Watch, St Paul's South Church, Dundee (1920)
- Lochee Bedding Factory, Dundee (1922)
- Victoria Cafe and Tea Garden, St Andrews (1922)
- War Memorial, Wallacetown Parish Church, Dundee (1922)
- Hamewith, Dundee (1926)
- Harris Academy (1926) replacing his alma mater
- House for Very Rev Alan Don, Dundee (1927)
- Aerated Water Factory and Offices, Dundee (1929)
- Grey Walls, Dundee (1929) as his own home
- Various houses on the Rosemount House estate, Blairgowrie (1929)
- St David's in the North, Dundee (1929)
- Bellfield Street RC School, Dundee (1930)
- Sunningdale, Stannergate, Dundee (1933)
- Draffen's Department Store, Nethergate, Dundee (1934)
- A second house for Very Rev Alan Don, Dundee (1937)
- Extension to the Tay Ropeworks, Dundee (1937)
- St Margaret's Episcopal Church and Hall, Lochee, Dundee (1939-1947) delayed due to war, completed after his death
