= Hatton Hill =

Mountain landform in Angus, Scotland

Coordinates: 56.5541°N 3.1216°W

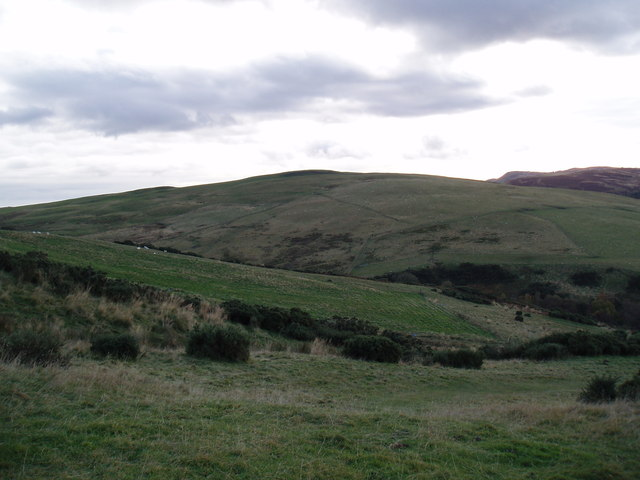
Hatton Hill from Kilpurnie

Hatton Hill is a mountain landform in Angus, Scotland in the Sidlaw Hills. Hatton Castle stands on the flanks of Hatton Hill above the village of Newtyle. The general vicinity has elements of prehistory including presence of the Eassie Stone, a Pictish stone dating back to the Dark Ages.

== See also ==
- Newtyle Hill

== Sources ==
- Alexander Johnston Warden, Angus Or Forfarshire: The Land and People, 1885, C. Alexander & co.
- C.Michael Hogan, Eassie Stone, The Megalithic Portal, ed. A. Burnham, 7 October 2007
