= Alexander Bryce (minister) =

Scottish Church of Scotland minister, mathematician, astronomer, scientist (1713–1786)

Alexander Bryce (1713–1786) was a Church of Scotland minister, mathematician, astronomer, scientist and poet who was Chaplain in Ordinary to King George III from 1770 to 1786.

He was a polymath and a friend of Robert Wallace and Colin Maclaurin.

In 1772 he explained the principles of creating an altimeter ultimately put into use to create the instruments.

== Life ==
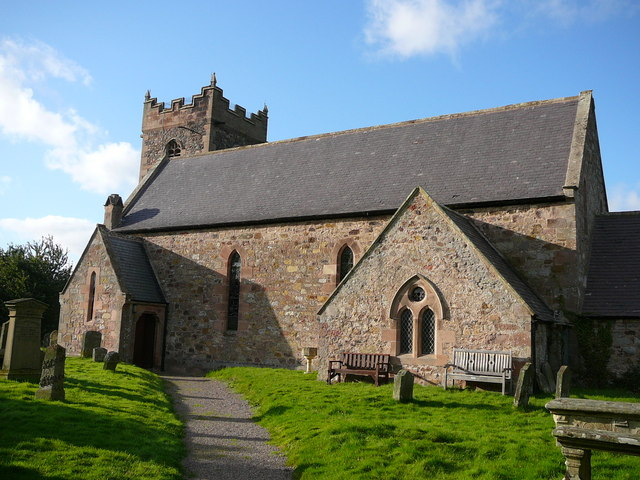
Kirknewton Parish Church

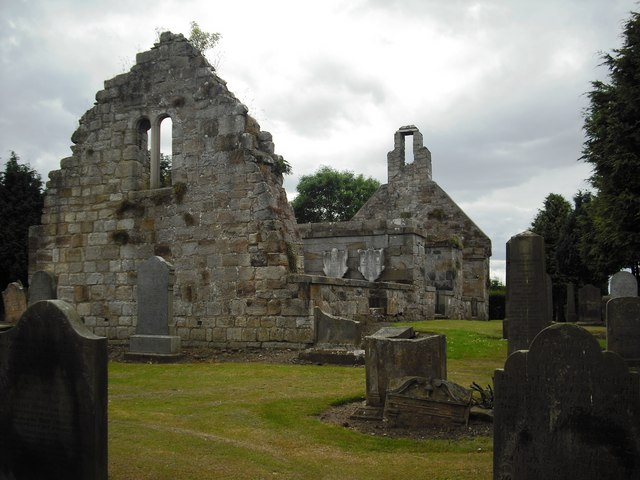
The ruins of St Cuthbert's Kirk in East Calder

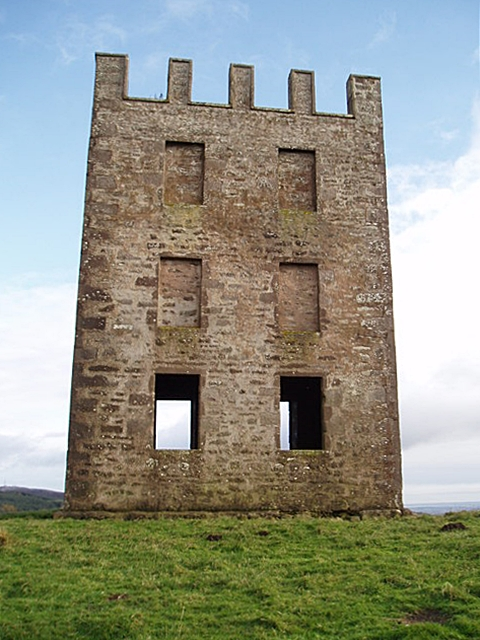
Kinpurnie Tower observatory on Kinpurnie Hill

He was born at Boarland in Kincardine-on-Forth in 1713. He was educated at both Doune and Kilmadock School. He graduated MA from Edinburgh University in 1735. From 1740 he acted as a private tutor in mathematics and astronomy (under patronage of Colin Maclaurin) in the Caithness area for three years where he became locally unpopular for mapping and tabulating shipwrecks on the coast in an attempt to prove a higher than expected number as evidence of "wreckers". However, "A Map of the North Coast of Britain" which he published in 1744 was the first to show this coastline accurately.

He was licensed to preach by the Presbytery of Dunblane in June 1744.

In August 1745 he was ordained as minister of Kirknewton Parish Church under the patronage of James, Earl of Morton. In 1750, under the patronage of the Duke of Buccleuch, he translated to East Calder Parish Church (St Cuthbert's).

In the 1745 rebellion he supplied the Duke of Cumberland with maps of the Scottish interior and recent troop movements. In 1745 and 1746 he taught mathematics at Edinburgh University and stood in for Colin Maclaurin during his illness.

In 1750 he uncovered that the Scottish standard pint, a pewter tankard held at Stirling and known as the Stirling Joug had gone astray and been replaced with a common pewter tankard. After a long search, it was found (somewhat damaged) in the attic of a Mr Urquhart, a coppersmith, whose goods had been seized in the 45 rebellion. The Scottish standard of weights and measures was thus restored.

Bryce also worked on clarifying other Scottish standards: establishing the number of grains in a cubic inch, and how many grains in a Scots pint. He was also one of the first to create comparative tables of Scots and English weights and measures. In 1754 Edinburgh made him an honorary burgess and guild member for this work.

In 1768–1769 he planned and had created an observatory on Kinpurnie Hill for Lord James Stuart-Mackenzie (known as Kilpurnie Tower). In 1776 he helped engineers create Stirling's first piped water supply and was given Freedom of the City as a reward.

In 1770 he was created Chaplain in Ordinary in Scotland to King George III. He died on 1 January 1786.

== Family ==
In October 1750 he married Janet Gillespie (d. 1807), daughter of the Provost of Stirling. Their children included:

- Mary (b. 1751)
- Margaret (b. 1753) married Theodore Alexander
- John Bryce WS (b. 1754)
- Janet (b. 1758)
- Isabel (b. 1761)
- James Bryce (b. 1766) Edinburgh surgeon
- Sir Alexander Bryce RE (1766–1832) military engineer (twin of James)
- William Bryce (b. 1770) minister of Aberdour

== Publications ==
As a poet he wrote "The Birks of Invermay". Later poems had a religious tone.

A map: " A Map of the North Coast of Britain from raw Stoir of Assynt to Wick in Caithness" (published 1744 by the Royal Society).

A map: "Map of the Three Lothians" (1773) the survey thereof

- An Account of a Comet Observed by Rev A Bryce (1766) a paper to the Royal Society
- A New Method of Measuring the Velocity of the Wind
- An Experiment to Ascertain to What Quantity of Water a Fall of Snow on the Earth's Surface is Equal
- Observations of the Transit of Venus: 6 June 1761
- Observations of the Transit of Venus: 3 June 1769
- Remarks on the Barometer for Measuring Altitude (1772) creating the theory for the altimeter
