= Kinpurnie Hill =

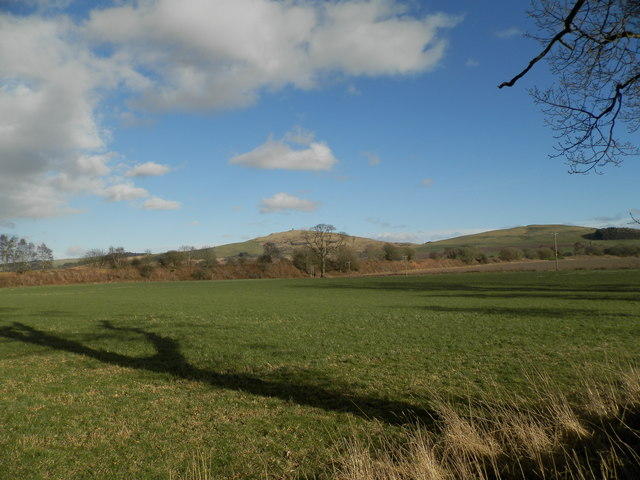

Highest point
- Elevation: 345 m (1,132 ft)
- Prominence: 49 m (161 ft)
- Coordinates: 56°33′46″N 3°06′14″W

Geography
- Location: Angus, Scotland
- Parent range: Sidlaw Hills
- Topo map: OS Landranger 53

Climbing
- Easiest route: Follow grass path to summit

Kinpurnie Hill is one of the most famous hills of the Sidlaw range in south-east Angus.

Kinpurnie Hill is located near Newtyle and is popular with hillwalkers.

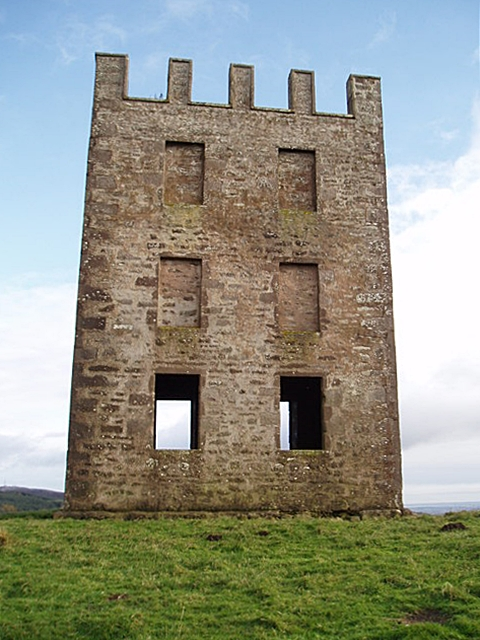
Kinpurnie Tower observatory on Kinpurnie Hill

== Name and etymology ==
The name Kinpurney was recorded in 1317 as Kylprony and has been described as "enigmatic". The initial element may be Gaelic coille meaning "wood", or ceann, "head". The -purney element appears to occur in several place-names in Aberdeenshire and may derive from Gaelic pronn meaning "crumbly soil". Or else, the element may be Pictish and derivation from a word related to Welsh bron, "breast, breast-shaped hill", has been suggested by linguist Guto Rhys.

== Kinpurnie Tower ==
Atop the hill is Kinpurnie Tower, designed by Rev Alexander Bryce (1713 - 1786), minister of Kirknewton and later East Calder and built by amateur astronomer James Stuart-Mackenzie in 1766 to be used as an observatory. It is 12 metres (39 ft) tall and is visible from the roadside.

It stands next to the site of an unfinished iron-age fort; remains of the vitrified walls and the large ditch can be seen in the area of the viewfinder and trig point. The viewfinder is useful for picking out the distant hills on a clear day.

The tower, which has walls 1 metre (3.3 ft) thick, fell into serious disrepair after it ceased to function as an observatory and faced demolition in the early 1970s. However, as it was such a well known landmark, plans were drawn up to restore the structure and the work, funded by the local authority and the Cayzer Estate, was completed in 1974.
