= Northballo Hill =

Coordinates: 56.504°N 3.218°W

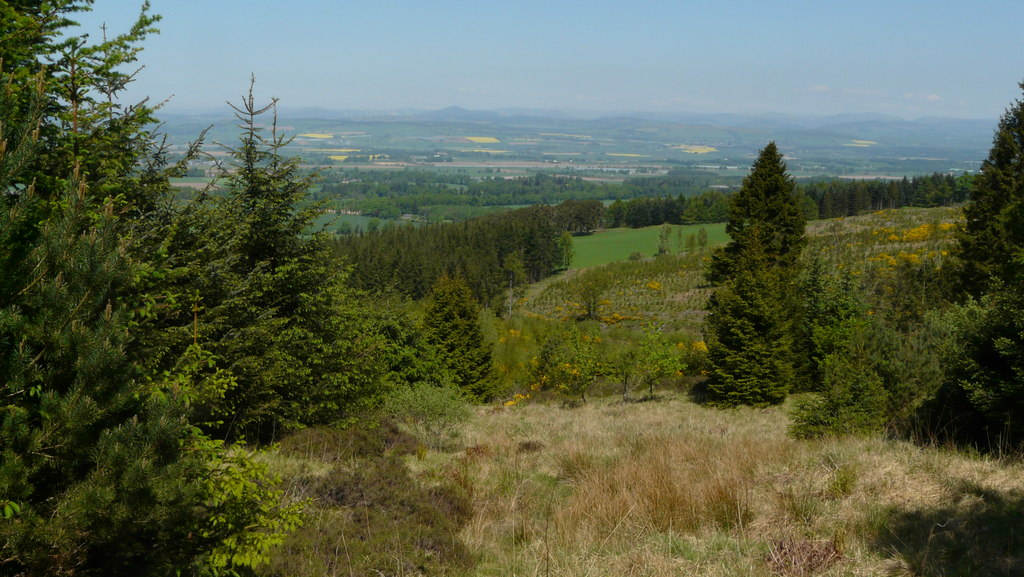

Highest point
- Elevation: 319 m (1,047 ft)
- Prominence: 95 m (312 ft)
- Parent peak: King's Seat

Geography
- Location: Perth & Kinross, Scotland
- Parent range: Sidlaw Hills
- Topo map: OS Landranger 53

Climbing
- Easiest route: Walk on path to highest point then go through trees to summit

Northballo Hill is one of the hills of the Sidlaw range in South East Perthshire, and is located near Coupar Angus. It is popular with dog walkers and hill walkers. Northballo Hill is covered in trees.
