= Baldragon railway station =

Disused railway station in Angus, Scotland

Coordinates: 56.50300°N 3.01311°W

Baldragon
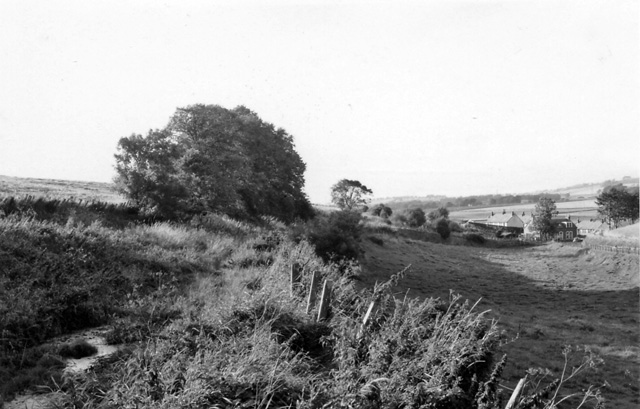
- Baldragon Station site (1974)

General information
- Location: Angus; Scotland
- Platforms: ?

Other information
- Status: Disused

History
- Original company: Dundee and Newtyle Railway
- Pre-grouping: Caledonian Railway
- Post-grouping: London Midland and Scottish Railway

Key dates
- 16 December 1831: Station opens
- 1 January 1917: Station closed
- 1 February 1919: station reopens
- 10 January 1955: Station closes
Location

Baldragon railway station served the village of Baldragon in the Scottish county of Angus. Services were provided by the Dundee and Newtyle Railway.

== History ==
Opened by the Dundee and Newtyle Railway and absorbed into the Caledonian Railway, it became part of the London, Midland and Scottish Railway during the Grouping of 1923. Passing on to the Scottish Region of British Railways on nationalisation in 1948, it was then closed by the British Transport Commission.

Preceding station	Historical railways	Following station
Baldovan	Caledonian Railway; Dundee and Newtyle Railway	Dronley
