= Bridgefoot, Angus =

Coordinates: 56.505623°N 3.013761°W

Bridgefoot
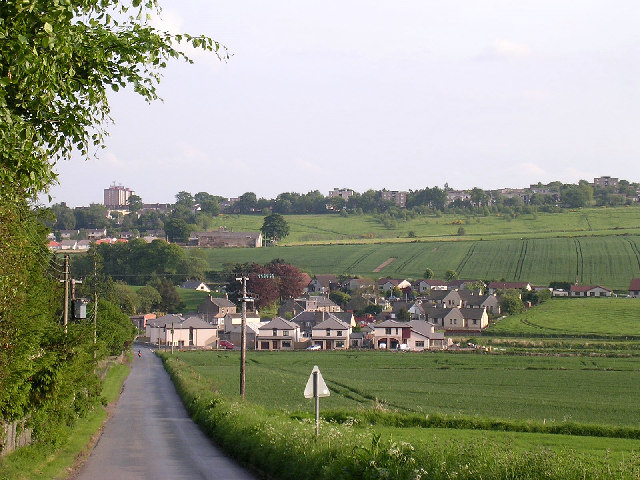
- Bridgefoot

- Location within Angus Location near the Dundee City council area
- OS grid reference: NO377353
- Council area: Angus
- Lieutenancy area: Angus
- Country: Scotland
- Sovereign state: United Kingdom
- Post town: DUNDEE
- Postcode district: DD3
- Dialling code: 01382
- Police: Scotland
- Fire: Scottish
- Ambulance: Scottish
- UK Parliament: Dundee West
- Scottish Parliament: Angus South

Bridgefoot, previously called Kirkton of Strathmartine, is a village in Angus, Scotland. It lies approximately one mile north of Dundee, to the west of Strathmartine Hospital.

It is said that a Celtic stone ringed via an iron fence, to the North of the village marks the spot where a dragon died.
