= Craigowl Hill =

Hill in Angus, Scotland

Coordinates: 56.54783°N 3.01652°W

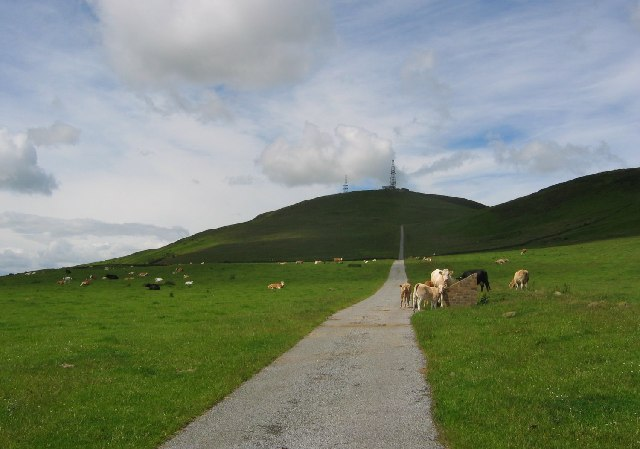
- Road leading to masts on Craigowl Hill

Highest point
- Elevation: 455 m (1,493 ft)
- Prominence: 393 m (1,289 ft)
- Parent peak: Lochnagar
- Listing: Marilyn, Hardy

Geography
- Craigowl Hill in Angus. Craigowl Hill in Scotland
- Location: Sidlaw Hills, Scotland
- OS grid: NO376400
- Topo map: OS Landranger 53

Craigowl Hill is a summit towards the eastern end of the Sidlaw Hills in Angus, Scotland. Northeast of Kirkton of Auchterhouse and approximately eight kilometres north of Dundee, Craigowl Hill represents the highest point in the range. It also known for being one of the hardest cycling climbs in Scotland, as a 3.36-kilometre (2 mi 155 yd) climb at 9.4% gradient.

== Geodesy ==
Craigowl Hill was the origin (meridian) of the six-inch-to-the-mile and 1:2500 Ordnance Survey maps of Angus (Forfarshire).

Craigowl Hill with transmission masts visible. (Photographed from Dundee Law at a distance of 8.5 km / 5.5 miles.)

== See also ==
- Wester Denoon
- List of places in Angus
