= List of listed buildings in Forgandenny, Perth and Kinross =

This is a list of listed buildings in the parish of Forgandenny in Perth and Kinross, Scotland.

== List ==
Name	Location	Date Listed	Grid Ref. (Note: Sometimes known as OSGB36, the grid reference (where provided) is based on the British national grid reference system used by the Ordnance Survey. • "Guide to National Grid". Ordnance Survey. • "Get-a-map". Ordnance Survey.)	Geo-coordinates	Notes	LB Number (Note: Historic Environment Scotland assign a unique alphanumeric identifier to each designated site in Scotland, for listed buildings this always begins with "LB", for example "LB12345".)	Image
Forgandenny Parish Churchyard				56°20′55″N 3°28′40″W	Category B	11304	Upload Photo
Forgandenny Schoolhouse				56°20′53″N 3°28′39″W	Category C(S)	11306	Upload Photo
Cairndey And Garpol Cottage, Forgandenny				56°20′53″N 3°28′43″W	Category C(S)	11309	Upload Photo
Hall, Formerly Free Church, Forgandenny				56°20′45″N 3°28′48″W	Category C(S)	11316	Upload Photo
Kirkton Of Mailer				56°21′53″N 3°26′33″W	Category B	11328	Upload Photo
Battledown, Forgandenny				56°20′51″N 3°28′39″W	Category C(S)	11312	Upload Photo
Redcote, Earndale And Balgownie, Forgandenny				56°20′52″N 3°28′40″W	Category C(S)	11313	Upload Photo
Strathallan School, Main Building				56°20′56″N 3°28′13″W	Category B	11320	Upload Photo
Viewfield, Forgandenny				56°20′52″N 3°28′46″W	Category C(S)	11315	Upload Photo
Rossie House, Gatepiers				56°20′45″N 3°29′02″W	Category B	11319	Upload another image
Erlston House (Former Manse Of Forgandenny)				56°20′41″N 3°29′13″W	Category C(S)	11323	Upload Photo
Newton Of Condie				56°20′49″N 3°29′49″W	Category B	11325	Upload Photo
Riley House, Strathallan School				56°20′57″N 3°28′29″W	Category C(S)	11322	Upload Photo
Rose Cottage, Forgandenny				56°20′53″N 3°28′34″W	Category C(S)	11305	Upload Photo
The Cedars, Forgandenny				56°20′53″N 3°28′41″W	Category C(S)	11307	Upload Photo
Rossie House, Doocot				56°20′54″N 3°29′10″W	Category B	11318	Upload Photo
Lady Well, Strathallan School				56°20′54″N 3°28′26″W	Category B	11321	Upload Photo
Croft Willox				56°20′38″N 3°29′14″W	Category C(S)	11324	Upload Photo
Newton Of Condie Doocot				56°20′42″N 3°29′42″W	Category B	11326	Upload Photo
Hilton House				56°21′53″N 3°25′55″W	Category A	11329	Upload Photo
Forgandenny Parish Church				56°20′56″N 3°28′40″W	Category B	11303	Upload Photo
Glenearn, Forgandenny				56°20′52″N 3°28′37″W	Category C(S)	11311	Upload Photo
Rossie Ochill House				56°18′02″N 3°28′36″W	Category B	11327	Upload Photo
The Eaves, Forgandenny				56°20′52″N 3°28′42″W	Category B	11308	Upload Photo
The Airds, Forgandenny				56°20′52″N 3°28′35″W	Category C(S)	11310	Upload Photo
The Croft, Forgandenny				56°20′51″N 3°28′42″W	Category B	11314	Upload Photo
Rossie House				56°20′54″N 3°28′58″W	Category B	11317	Upload another image

== Key ==
The scheme for classifying buildings in Scotland is:

- Category A: "buildings of national or international importance, either architectural or historic; or fine, little-altered examples of some particular period, style or building type."
- Category B: "buildings of regional or more than local importance; or major examples of some particular period, style or building type, which may have been altered."
- Category C: "buildings of local importance; lesser examples of any period, style, or building type, as originally constructed or moderately altered; and simple traditional buildings which group well with other listed buildings."

In March 2016 there were 47,288 listed buildings in Scotland. Of these, 8% were Category A, and 50% were Category B, with the remaining 42% being Category C.
