= Oliphant's Gym =

Historic gym in Toronto, Ontario, Canada

Coordinates: 43.67252°N 79.41587°W

- Type: Private
- Genre: Fitness, Health Clubs
- Founded: 1913
- Founder: William Oliphant, Sr.
- Headquarters: Toronto, Ontario, Canada
- Number of locations: 1 (May 2012)
- Key people: Buster Oliphant (d. 1996)
- Website: www.oliphantsgym.com

Oliphant's Gym, also known as Oliphant's Academy of Physical Culture, is a historic gym in Toronto, Ontario, Canada. Founded in 1913 by William Oliphant Sr. It is claimed to be one of the oldest continually operating gyms in North America. Run by William Oliphant Sr.'s son Buster Oliphant Jr. until the heir's death in 1996, the gym has a long history in Toronto's Annex neighbourhood and its character has been preserved through the decades. Since 1996, the gym has been operated by its members on a non-profit and volunteer basis.

== History ==
Oliphant's Gym was founded in 1913 as Oliphant's Academy of Physical Culture and operated out of the basement of St. Andrew's Church in Toronto's downtown area. It has operated at its current Dupont Street location in Toronto's Annex neighbourhood since the 1980s.

Beginning with its founder, the gym established a tradition of contributing to the "advancement of weight lifting and body building". William Oliphant developed the Oliphant System, "which his advertising said was also good for round shoulders and constipation". The gym features many pictures on the wall of Toronto's "distinguished lawyers, doctors, architects and businessmen" who were patrons.

The gym celebrated its 100th anniversary on November 24, 2013. In celebration of the anniversary, a motion was made to the Toronto and East York Community Council to rename a street as "William Oliphant Lane" to honor the gym's founder, William Oliphant, Sr. The motion was supported by Toronto city Councillor for Ward 20, Adam Vaughan.

== Notable alumni ==
- Red Kelly — former Toronto Maple Leafs player
- Jim McKenny — former Toronto Maple Leafs player
- Jimmy Fowler — former Toronto Maple Leafs player
- Gus Bodnar — former Toronto Maple Leafs player
- Ron Ellis — former Toronto Maple Leafs player
- Hugh Bolton — former Toronto Maple Leafs player
