= William Oliphant (governor of Stirling Castle) =

Scottish knight and Governor of Stirling Castle (died aft. 1313)

Sir William Oliphant
- Governor of Stirling Castle
- Died: After 1313
- Noble family: Clan Oliphant

Sir William Oliphant (died aft. 1313), was a Scottish knight and Governor of Stirling Castle during the Wars of Scottish Independence. He switched loyalties to the English and died in a Scottish prison.

== Biography ==
Sir William Oliphant fought at the Battle of Dunbar in 1296, where the Scots, under their king John Balliol, were defeated by the invading English. Following the battle he was captured and taken to Devizes Castle in England where he was imprisoned. He was freed on 8 September 1297 and with his fellow prisoner John of Strathbogie, Earl of Atholl returned to Scotland to serve in King Edward I's army. Breaking his pledge to Edward I, he next appears as the governor of Stirling Castle and when attacked by King Edward's army he refused to surrender without permission of the Guardian of Scotland, John de Soules who was in France at the time. His small garrison held out against the full might of Edward's army until 20 July 1304 when they were forced to surrender. While Edward agreed to favorable terms in writing, immediately after the surrender he broke the terms and imprisoned Oliphant in the Tower of London. In this same year all of Scotland with the exception of William Wallace swore fealty to Edward I.

In 1308, he was released on mainprise on 24 May 1308 and shortly afterwards returned to Scotland where he served king Edward II of England. In 1309 he was at Stirling Castle. By 1312 Sir William was in command of the key English outpost, the fortified town of Perth. A six-week siege by Robert the Bruce had little effect so the Scots withdrew in open sight of the English garrison. Little more than a week later after nightfall, the Scots crossed the Lade, Perth's moat at the time, and climbed the wall. They took the town with little bloodshed. However many of the higher ranking Scots and English were executed while most of the English were allowed to go free. However, John Barbour said that King Robert "commanded on great pains" that only those who could not be captured were to be killed. Since Oliphant was not executed but was sent in chains to the western Isles, where he apparently died a prisoner there is some reason to think Barbour was correct. There is no further mention of him in any records. (Note: He has been confused with his cousin William Oliphant, Lord of Aberdalgie who signed the Declaration of Arbroath in 1320 and died in 1329. See the Scots Peerage, VI, 531–34.)

== See also ==
- Clan Oliphant
