= Ardblair Castle =

16th-century Scottish castle

Coordinates: 56.5851°N 3.3635°W

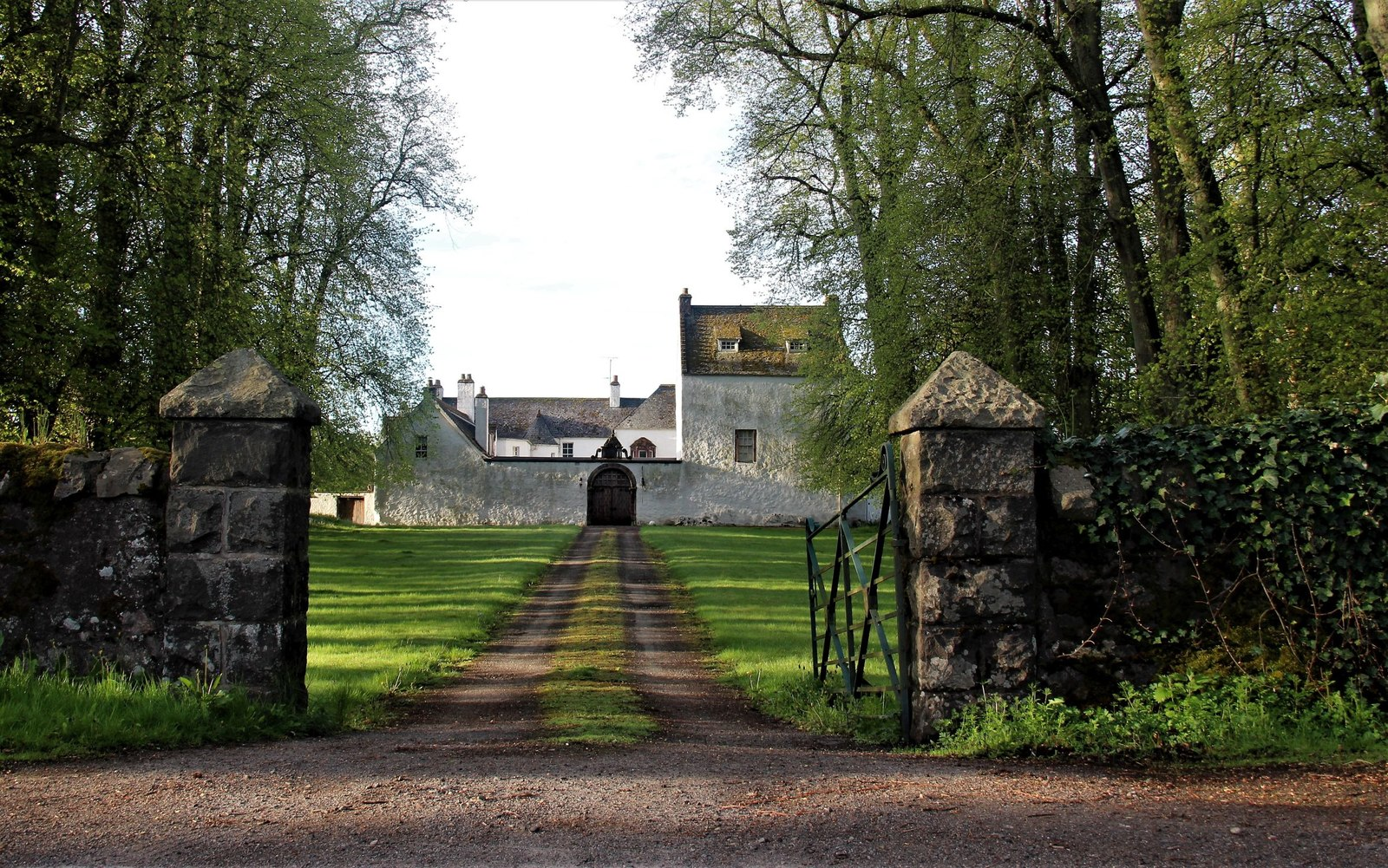

Ardblair Castle is an L-plan castle (with an added wing), dating from the 16th century, around 0.75 miles (1.21 km) west of Blairgowrie in Perth and Kinross, Scotland. This castle is the subject of a green lady ghostlore story.

== History ==
In 1399 the property was acquired by the Blairs of Balthavock; this was by a grant by David II. Patrick Blair of Ardblair was beheaded for the murder of George Drummond of Ledcrieff and his son, cousins of the Earl of Atholl, after a trial in 1554. Through marriage the property passed to the Oliphants of Gask in 1792, and the house remains the property of the Blair Oliphant family. Many Jacobite relics were brought to the property from Gask during the 20th century.

Lady Nairne, the songwriter, was a frequent visitor to the castle.

== Structure ==
It is thought that the original castle was built by the Blairs during the Norman period, on the site of a fort, with the tower at the north west being built on the foundation of part of the earlier castle.

Ardblair Castle is one of the few castles which still has its courtyard. The original L-plan tower house had three storeys and an attic. There is a stair-turret, which is corbelled out to above the first storey, in the re-entrant angle. It is capped by a conical roof.

The later additions form a courtyard, the north side being a wall with a central arched gateway, dated from 1668. In the centre of the courtyard there is a sundial bearing the date 1623 and with 25 dials.

The entrance has an ornate panel space above it, though this has no inscription.

The basement, which probably housed the kitchen, is vaulted. It has a wide fireplace; its massive chimney-stack it a notable feature of the main building's south side. The tower had a Hall on the first floor, which is now the panelled dining-room, dating from the 18th century. The interior mainly dates from the 18th century.

The castle was once almost surrounded by a loch, which is now largely drained.

It is a category A listed building.

== Ghostlore ==
The castle, like many others, is said to be haunted by a 'green lady', who is dressed in green silk, and who searches the chambers of the castle. It is supposed that this is Lady Jean Drummond of Newton, who died of a broken heart having fallen in love with one of the Blairs, despite the feuds between the families. She drowned in a local marsh.
