= King's Seat =

Hill in Perth and Kinross, Scotland

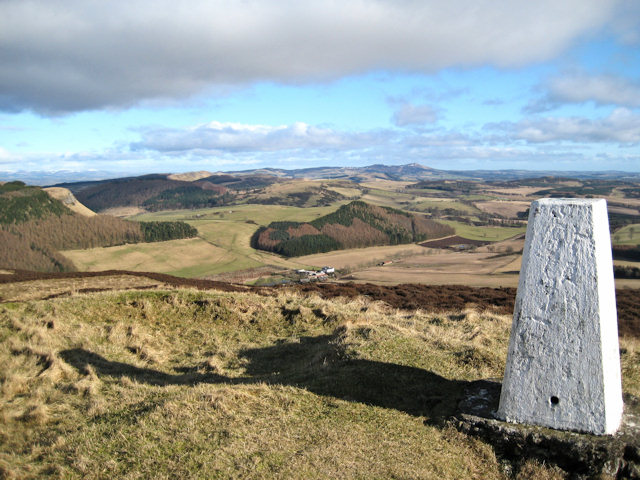
- Looking across the Sidlaw Hills from the summit

Highest point
- Elevation: 377 m (1,237 ft)
- Prominence: 219 m (719 ft)
- Listing: Marilyn
- Coordinates: 56.4827°N 3.2503°W

Geography
- Location: Perth & Kinross, Scotland
- Parent range: Sidlaw Hills
- OS grid: NO230330
- Topo map: OS Landranger 53

King's Seat (Scottish Gaelic: Ceann Sidhe) is one of the principal hills of the Sidlaw range in South East Perthshire. At 377 metres (1,237 ft), it is classified as a Marilyn. King's Seat is located near Collace and is adjacent to Black Hill and the smaller Dunsinane, made famous by its mention in Shakespeare's play Macbeth.
