= William Oliphant, Lord of Aberdalgie =

Scottish magnate, knight and leader (died 1329)

Sir William Oliphant
- Lord of Aberdalgie
- Arms of Sir William Oliphant, Lord of Aberdalgie
- Died: 1329
- Noble family: Clan Oliphant
- Spouse: Isabel Douglas
- Father: William Oliphant

Sir William Oliphant (died 1329), Lord of Aberdalgie and Dupplin, (Note: There is confusion between two Sir William Oliphants, both cousins, who fought together "and it is not possible to discriminate between their respective actions with certainty." See Scots Peerage, VI, 531.) was a Scottish magnate, knight and leader during the Wars of Scottish Independence.

== Life ==
Oliphant fought at the Battle of Dunbar in 1296, where the Scots, under their king John Balliol, were defeated by the invading English. Following the battle he was captured and taken to Rochester Castle in England where he was imprisoned. He was released after agreeing to serve King Edward I of England overseas. He returned to Scotland where he was second in command of Stirling Castle under his cousin of the same name, Sir William Oliphant. (Note: In the list of defenders his cousin is called Domini Williellmus Olyfard [lord William Oliphant] while he is listed secondly as Willielmus de Dupplyn, milites [William of Dupplin, knight]. See John Donald Carrick, Life of Sir William Wallace of Elderslie, Volume 2 (Edinburgh: Constable & Co., 1830), p. 137.) During the siege of 1304, when the castle was attacked by the forces of Edward I of England, the garrison eventually surrendered to the English. He was captured once again, this time being imprisoned at Wallingford Castle while his cousin the commander was imprisoned in the Tower of London. In this same year all of Scotland with the exception of William Wallace had sworn fealty to Edward I.

For 110 shillings, as "William Olyfaunt, Knight", (Note: This is the first modern use of the name found in any records and he may have adopted this spelling to distinguish himself from his cousin or his father, both named William. See Scots Peerage, VI, 533 n. 9.) he was bonded by Hugh le Despenser, the elder and remained in England until 1313. He had a safe conduct to return to Scotland on 21 October of that year and was a witness to a charter of King Robert the Bruce in February 1314–15. He was one of the signatories to the Declaration of Arbroath on 6 April 1320 and his seal is still visible. (Note: The seal, Gules three crescents Argent, is the earliest known example of the Oliphant arms and dates from the declaration.)

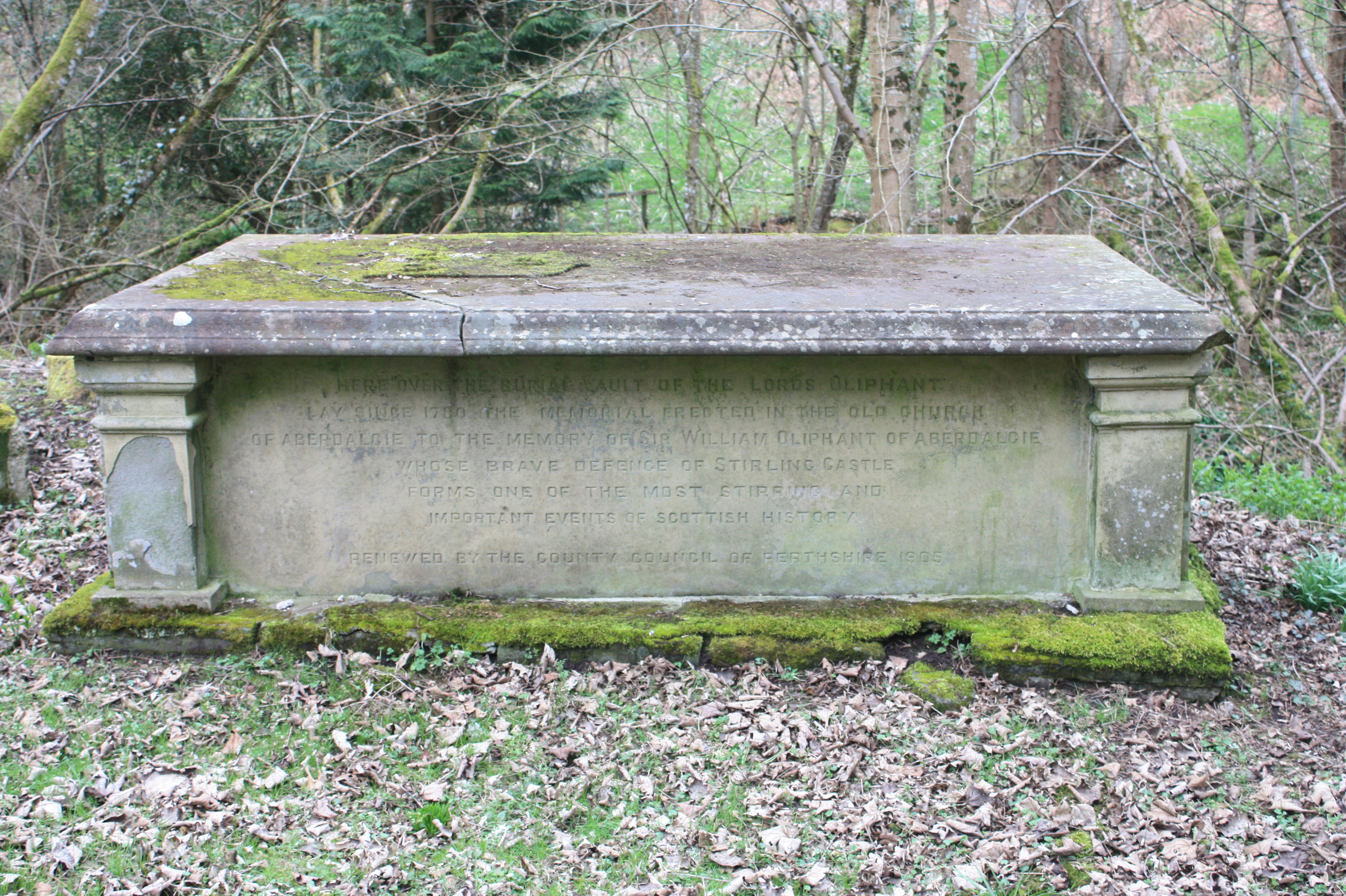
The grave of Sir William Oliphant, Aberdalgie (restored 1905)

Sir William's tomb is in Aberdalgie Churchyard, in Perthshire, within the site of the original church. The effigy is made from "Tournai marble" from northern France or Flanders. The grave lies at the furthest corner of the churchyard close to a small stream.

He left his estates to his son Walter. These included Dupplin, Hedderwick and Cranshaws which he inherited from his Oliphant predecessors; Aberdalgie, Turin, Glensaugh, Pitkerie and Gallery which apparently came into the family from a Wishart heiress; Gasknes, Newtyle, Kinpurnie, Auchtertyre, Balcrais, Muirhouse and Hazelhead acquired as gifts from the King.

== Family ==
The name of Sir William's wife is Isabel Douglas, they had a son:

- Sir Walter Oliphant (Olifaunt) of Aberdalgie and Dupplin, he married Elizabeth, the youngest daughter of King Robert I (Bruce) de Brus. Their descendant, Sir Laurence Oliphant of Aberdalgie, was created Lord Oliphant in 1456.

== See also ==
- Clan Oliphant
