= Auchterhouse =

Village in Angus, Scotland

Coordinates: 56.525°N 3.087°W

Auchterhouse: Scottish Gaelic: Uachdaras
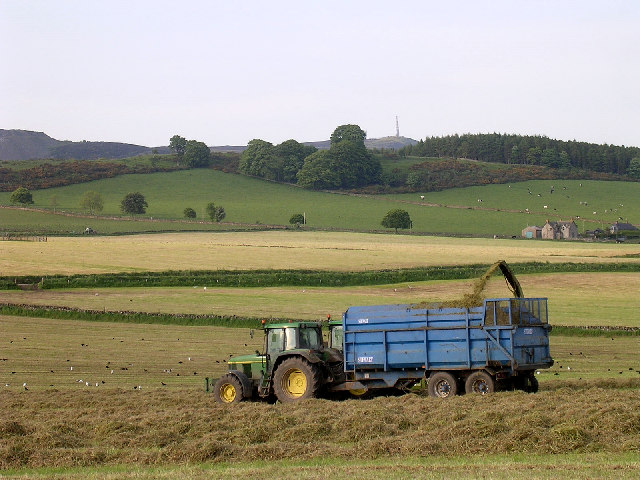
- Silage making near Kirkton, in Auchterhouse

- Location within Angus
- Population: 700 (2011)
- OS grid reference: NO3337
- Civil parish: Auchterhouse
- Council area: Angus
- Lieutenancy area: Angus
- Country: Scotland
- Sovereign state: United Kingdom
- Post town: DUNDEE
- Postcode district: DD3
- Dialling code: 01382
- Police: Scotland
- Fire: Scottish
- Ambulance: Scottish
- UK Parliament: Dundee West
- Scottish Parliament: Angus South

Auchterhouse (Scots pronunciation: [ˈɑːxtərhus]; Scottish Gaelic: Uachdaras) is a village, community, and civil parish in the Scottish council area of Angus, located 7.3 miles (11.7 km) north west of Dundee, 9.5 miles (15.3 km) south east of Alyth and 14.9 miles (24.0 km) south west of Forfar. It lies on the southern edge of the Sidlaw Hills, below Auchterhouse Hill, 1,398 feet (426 m) high. The parish, which is coterminous with the community, had a population of 520 in 2001. The village, formerly known as Milltown of Auchterhouse, straddles the B954 Muirhead to Newtyle road. About 1.0 mile (1.6 km) east lies the larger village of Kirkton of Auchterhouse, where the church and school are located.

Singer Billy MacKenzie lived in the village from 1991 until his death in 1997. Kirkton, in Auchterhouse, was the subject of the painting 'Sidlaw Village, Winter' by James MacIntosh Patrick.

== History ==
The earliest human settlement discovered around Auchterhouse dates from 3500 to 1000 BC, in the form of stone and bronze tools used by the first farmers to clear woodland. Wheat and barley were grown, and cattle and sheep kept, while a decorated sandstone spindle whorl found at Bonnyton, north of the village, and now kept at the McManus Galleries in Dundee, indicates that wool was spun into thread. A possible henge in Dronley Wood has been revealed by aerial photography, and a stone circle at Templelands was destroyed during railway construction in the 19th century.

A stone cairn on West Mains Hill, excavated in 1897, was found to conceal a double burial cist, typical of the period around 2000 BC. The cist contained burnt bones and a bronze dagger blade with ox-horn hilt, which are now in the National Museum of Scotland in Edinburgh. Other cists were reportedly discovered in the 19th century, and a circular burial mound survives south of Dronley House. Cup marks on stones were found around Auchterhouse Park.

An Iron Age hillfort on Auchterhouse Hill occupies a naturally defensible position, and is protected to the east and south east by a set of five ramparts and ditches. Souterrains, thought to have provided storage space for foodstuffs, were discovered in the 18th century near Auchterhouse Mansion and in Kirkton of Auchterhouse, and aerial photography has since revealed further sites at East Adamston, Bonnyton, Burnhead of Auchterhouse and Quarry House. Long cists, slab-lined graves in which fully extended bodies were placed, are commonly associated with the period between 1000 BC and 500 AD, and have been recorded at Auchterhouse Park, Leoch and Templeton.

A parish church, dedicated to Saint Mary, had been founded by 1238, and Sir John Ramsay played host to both Sir William Wallace and King Edward I of England at Wallace Tower, now part of Auchterhouse Mansion, in 1303. The village came under the jurisdiction of James Stewart, the Earl of Buchan in 1469. He also held the title Lord Auchterhouse, and was the uncle of King James III.

The adoption of new agricultural techniques in the 18th and 19th centuries led to increased prosperity in rural areas. Between 1820 and 1850 farm production in Scotland increased by 58 per cent. This new wealth was reflected in Auchterhouse with the construction of new farm buildings at Dronley, East Adamston, Eastfield, Kirkton of Auchterhouse, Leoch and Templeton. Balbeuchley was one of the earliest improved steadings in the area, built in 1802, while Balbeuchley House was built for Patrick Miller, proprietor of the Auchterhouse Estate from 1820 to 1876. The farmhouse at Pitpointie, dated 1883, was built on the site of an earlier steading for George Willsher, a Dundee wine and spirit dealer. Originally built in 1707, the water-powered corn mill at Dronley was rebuilt during this period, and stone quarries were developed at Leoch and Parkside, but perhaps the greatest change to the village came with the opening of the Dundee and Newtyle Railway, one of Scotland's first passenger lines, in 1831. Sandstone for the line was quarried at Pitpointie.

On 2 May 1899 a meeting was held at the Town Hall in Dundee to establish a sanatorium for the treatment of tuberculosis (then known as consumption). Plans were drawn up for the creation of a 30-bed hospital, and a site at Auchterhouse Park was gifted by David Ogilvy, the Earl of Airlie. Construction started in 1901, and Dundee Sanatorium was formally opened by his widow Mabell Ogilvy, Countess of Airlie on 26 September 1902, at a cost of £20,764. The Dundee Advertiser commented:

The establishment of institutions of this kind has been very much encouraged by the unanimous approbation of the medical profession all over the country. That this disease is no longer regarded by the medical profession as either hereditary or as incurable - hence the establishment of these sanatoria all over the kingdom - is a circumstance that is calculated to bring an element of hope to those sufferers, and be a source of satisfaction to their relatives and friends. The Institution so auspiciously opened today enters upon its course of usefulness and will shelter and bring healing to very many of our afflicted sisters and brothers.

The first patients were admitted on 11 March 1903, and the following year the institution was renamed the Sidlaw Sanatorium. During the first year of operation, 87 patients were admitted. One patient died, but 67 were discharged. The average stay was just under four months. By 1907 the sanatorium was making a yearly loss of between £500 and £700, and the annual report complained that although the institution was endowed to help the working classes of Dundee, it was not possible to do this due to the need to accept paying patients to contribute to the costs. By 1909 the financial position was so serious that the directors agreed to close the sanatorium the following year, but Sir James Caird, the Dundee jute baron, agreed to provide £1,000 per year if the institution was taken over by Dundee Royal Infirmary, and the transfer was completed in October 1910. The sanatorium eventually closed in 1969 but continued as an NHS convalescent and respite care home until 4 November 1980 (according to the national archives).

== Geography ==
Auchterhouse stands below the southern slopes of the Sidlaw Hills. The Auchterhouse Burn flows south to join the Dronley Burn, which continues across the south of the community, joining the Dighty Water on the southern boundary of Auchterhouse. This then flows eastwards, to the north of Dundee, to join the Firth of Tay at Monifieth.

The land rises from south to north, reaching 1,398 feet (426 m) at Auchterhouse Hill, the highest point in the community. In the north the land consists of moorlands over underlying sandstone. The lower lying southern parts consist of glacial till which, when drained, produces good crops of oats, barley, potatoes and turnips, and is suitable for dairy farming. There are a number of spruce and Scots pine plantations, particularly on the higher ground.

== Transport ==
A feasibility study to build a railway from Strathmore to Dundee was proposed in 1825, and the first meeting of the Dundee and Newtyle Railway Company took place the following year. Construction started rapidly, and the section from Hatton to Balbeuchley was completed by 1827. The line opened on 16 December 1831. The coaches were, at first, drawn up the Hatton incline by a newly installed stationary engine, with horses providing the power from the top of the incline. The horses were assisted by a wagon sheet on a pole attached to the carriage to harness favourable winds. A second stationary engine was installed at Balbeuchley the following year, and in 1833 two steam engines, the Earl of Airlie and the Lord Wharncliffe, replaced horses on the level sections. Coal and lime were carried from Dundee, while in the other direction, fruit was transported and stone from local quarries provided building material for the rapidly expanding city. In addition, 31,000 passengers were being carried by 1833. In 1834 a locomotive derailment at Pitpointie resulted in the death of John Anderson, the miller at Auchterhouse.

In 1846 the line was leased to the Dundee and Perth Railway Company, which changed its name to the Dundee and Perth and Aberdeen Junction Railway Company two years later. The route was diverted through Dronley, avoiding the Balbeuchley incline, in 1860, resulting in Auchterhouse station being resited and a new Dronley railway station provided. In 1861 the line was extended from Newtyle to Alyth. It was absorbed by the Scottish Central Railway Company in 1863, which in turn was taken over by the Caledonian Railway Company in 1865. Three years later, the Hatton incline was eliminated, and a deviation built into Newtyle. The Caledonian Railway became part of the London, Midland and Scottish Railway Company under the Railways Act 1921.

Severe snow storms hit Angus in February 1947, and a passenger train was snowed in at Dronley cutting for over a week. Severe rationing still existed at the time, the roads were blocked, and the coal from the stranded engine was stolen, so that more had to be sent for to get the engine started again. There were also problems at Auchterhouse station, where snow drifts blocked the line under the road bridge. It would have been a massive task to dig out the drift, so a pair of large locomotives was sent from Newtyle, with a large snowplough attached. Although the engines managed to get some distance, the drivers soon realised they would need to get up speed before tackling the drifts. The engines and snowplough reversed back along the line and then charged. The force caused by the displaced snow as the engines passed through the station was so great that there was hardly a pane of glass left in the signal box or station buildings, and all the doors were smashed. It took over a week to repair the damage.

Following the damage caused by World War II, in 1948 the United Kingdom's railways were nationalised, and the line became part of British Railways. It survived for just seven years, with passenger services withdrawn on 10 January 1955. Freight services continued, but the Auchterhouse–Newtyle section closed in 1958, and the remaining route to Dundee ceased operation on 5 April 1965.

== Education ==
By 1873 public schools had been established in Auchterhouse for both boys and girls. Children attended between the ages of five and 13, and of the 165 living in the parish, 141 were enrolled. By the following year, just nine children were not attending, and the school board instructed an officer to call and warn their parents that proceedings would be taken if their absences continued. A report in 1875 highlighted deficiencies in the girls' school:

We are disappointed with the appearance made by this little school. The number of failures is very great especially in arithmetic. The general intelligence and meaning of words are only fair and the Higher Subjects are weak generally. The school is altogether unnecessary and unsuitable. The building is inferior in every way and badly ventilated. The situation is very unsuitable and apparently unhealthy. The offices are very inconveniently situated and there is no playground obtainable. Adequate accommodation ought to be at once provided in the principal School distant about 50 yards and all the staff properly organised with a proper division of labour set to work there. The Board must at once bestir themselves and make sufficient provision for the education in the Parish.

In response, the school board set about merging the two schools, a new teacher for the girls was appointed, to be under the supervision of the boys' teacher, and the girls' school building was refitted as a home for the female teacher. The new arrangement did not work well, and following professional disagreements between the two teachers, it was decided to operate two separate schools in the same building.

Auchterhouse Primary School continues to provide primary education, and had 55 pupils in 2010, including nine in the nursery class. The school holds an Eco-Schools Green Flag award. It was last inspected by Education Scotland in 2010. At the age of 11, pupils transfer to Monifieth High School, located at Monifieth,12.7 miles (20.4 km) south east of Auchterhouse. The school was last inspected in 2006, when it had 1,071 pupils.

== Religion ==
The parish church, dedicated to Saint Mary, had been founded by 1238. The original building was replaced by a Gothic structure in 1426, and was in turn replaced in 1630. It has been described as "the last specimen of early church architecture in Scotland". Due to a structural defect, it was partially rebuilt in 1775. It now consists of a rectangular chancel at the east end, a large rectangular nave, and a western tower. Two Norman fonts dating from the original 13th-century church remain, and a stone marked "Ave Maria" is incorporated into the east gable of the present building. A clock at the rear of the church was made by the Dundee clockmaker Thomas Ivory.

Underneath the present church is an old burial vault containing remains of the Buchan, Lyon and Ogilvy families, but there are no memorial tablets. Despite the General Assembly of the Church of Scotland forbidding the practice in 1643, burials continued to take place under the rush-strewn dirt floor.

John Glas, the founder of the Glasite sect in the First Great Awakening, a Christian revitalisation movement that swept Protestant Europe in the 18th century, preached at Auchterhouse in 1721. He was the minister at nearby Tealing, where his preaching drew a large congregation. In The Testimony of the King of Martyrs Concerning His Kingdom, published in 1729, he claimed that every national church established by the laws of earthly kingdoms was anti-Christian, and repudiated Presbyterianism. He was suspended by the church in 1728, and formed a breakaway church in Dundee. In 1739 the Church of Scotland restored his status as a minister.

A strongbox containing the poor money, destined to relieve poverty in the parish, was broken into and stolen in 1789, and two men were detained but later acquitted. A reward of £5 was advertised in the Edinburgh newspapers:

Whereas some day of the week preceding Sabbath, the 19th April current, the Kirk-session's box of Auchterhouse, which stood in the session-house, was broken open, and sundry valuable papers and securities, with about Thirty or Forty Pounds in cash, were carried off, a reward of £5 stg. will be paid by the Kirk-Session to any person who shall make such a discovery as will be sufficient to convict any of the offenders.

== Sport ==
Clay target shooting is held at Auchterhouse Country Sports, one of the shooting grounds used for the selection of the Scottish Clay Target Association's national teams, and where the all round Scottish championship was held in 2011. The centre, located in a former quarry, also hosts archery, falconry, quad biking, paintball and tank driving.
