= Newtyle =

Coordinates: 56.558°N 3.144°W

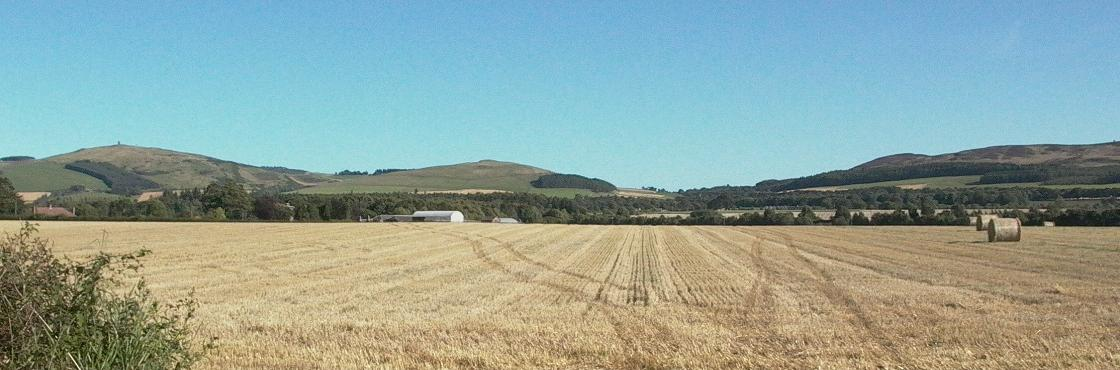
- Looking south towards the Sidlaw Hills. Left to right: Kinpurnie, Hatton, and Newtyle Hills.

- Location within Angus
- Population: 680 (2020)
- OS grid reference: NO297413
- Council area: Angus
- Lieutenancy area: Angus
- Country: Scotland
- Sovereign state: United Kingdom
- Post town: Blairgowrie
- Postcode district: PH12
- Dialling code: 01828
- Police: Scotland
- Fire: Scottish
- Ambulance: Scottish
- UK Parliament: Angus and Perthshire glens
- Scottish Parliament: Angus South

Newtyle is a village in the west of Angus, Scotland. It lies eleven miles (eighteen kilometres) north of Dundee in the southwest of Strathmore, between Hatton Hill and Newtyle (Heather Hill) in the Sidlaws. The village sits on gently sloping ground with a northwest aspect. The main communication link is the B954 road. The population was about 800 as of 2004.

== History ==
The original village of Newtyle was centred on the church and what are now Kirkton Road and Smiddy road. Hatton Castle to the south and Newbigging to the north lie within the parish boundary.

=== The Railway ===
Newtyle was the northern terminus for the first commercial railway in Scotland, the Dundee and Newtyle Railway which opened in 1831. The grid street plan of the central part of the village was laid out shortly after the railway opened and was intended to form the basis for a manufacturing centre which could take advantage of the communications link to Dundee. Rail services to and from Newtyle were in decline for a number of years before the line was closed in the 1960s under the Beeching Axe. Most of the railway buildings have since been demolished but the embankments and cuttings remain a prominent feature of the countryside surrounding the village.

=== Bannatyne Home of Rest ===
In 1887 Bannatyne House in Newtyle was purchased by Alexander H. Moncur, a former Provost of Dundee. He enlarged it and converted it to be used as holiday home for female jute workers from the Dundee jute mills. It was officially gifted and endowed as Bannatyne Home of Rest in 1892. It could provide accommodation for up to 50 people. Financial difficulties led to the closure of the home in 1961, and it was sold the following year. The house dates from c. 1589.

== Education ==
Newtyle school provides education at primary level up to year 7 after which pupils travel elsewhere for secondary education. The school provided two years of secondary education until 1998. Local government boundary changes have seen different generations of Newtyle pupils receive their secondary education at Forfar Academy, Harris Academy in Dundee, Monifieth High School and latterly at Webster's High School in Kirriemuir. A new school was constructed in 2009 to replace the old building which had been in use since 1963.

== Economy ==
There are no major employers in Newtyle, but a number of small local businesses also provide employment within the village. A large part of the working population commutes to Dundee.

== Notable people ==
The poet William Thom worked as a weaver in Newtyle in the 1830s. James Robertson, the novelist, together with his wife, lives in a converted villa that was once a branch of the Royal Bank of Scotland in Newtyle.

== See also ==
- Hatton Castle
- Kinpurnie Castle
