= Sidlaws =

Range of hills in Scotland

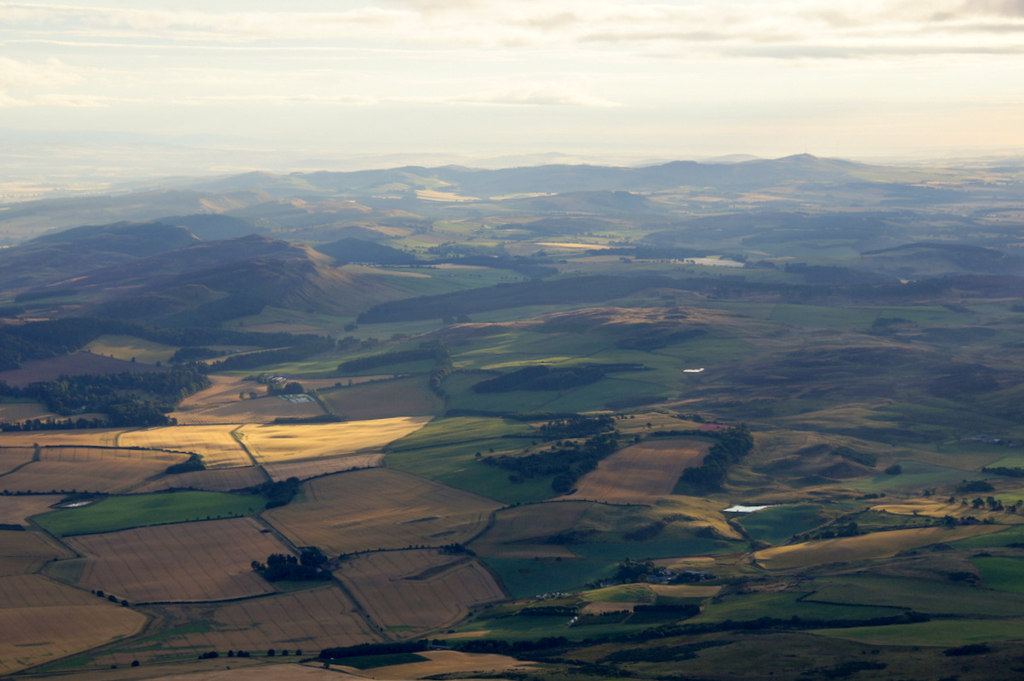
- Aerial view of the Sidlaw Hills

Highest point
- Elevation: 455 m (1,493 ft)
- Coordinates: 56°30′N 3°10′W

Geography
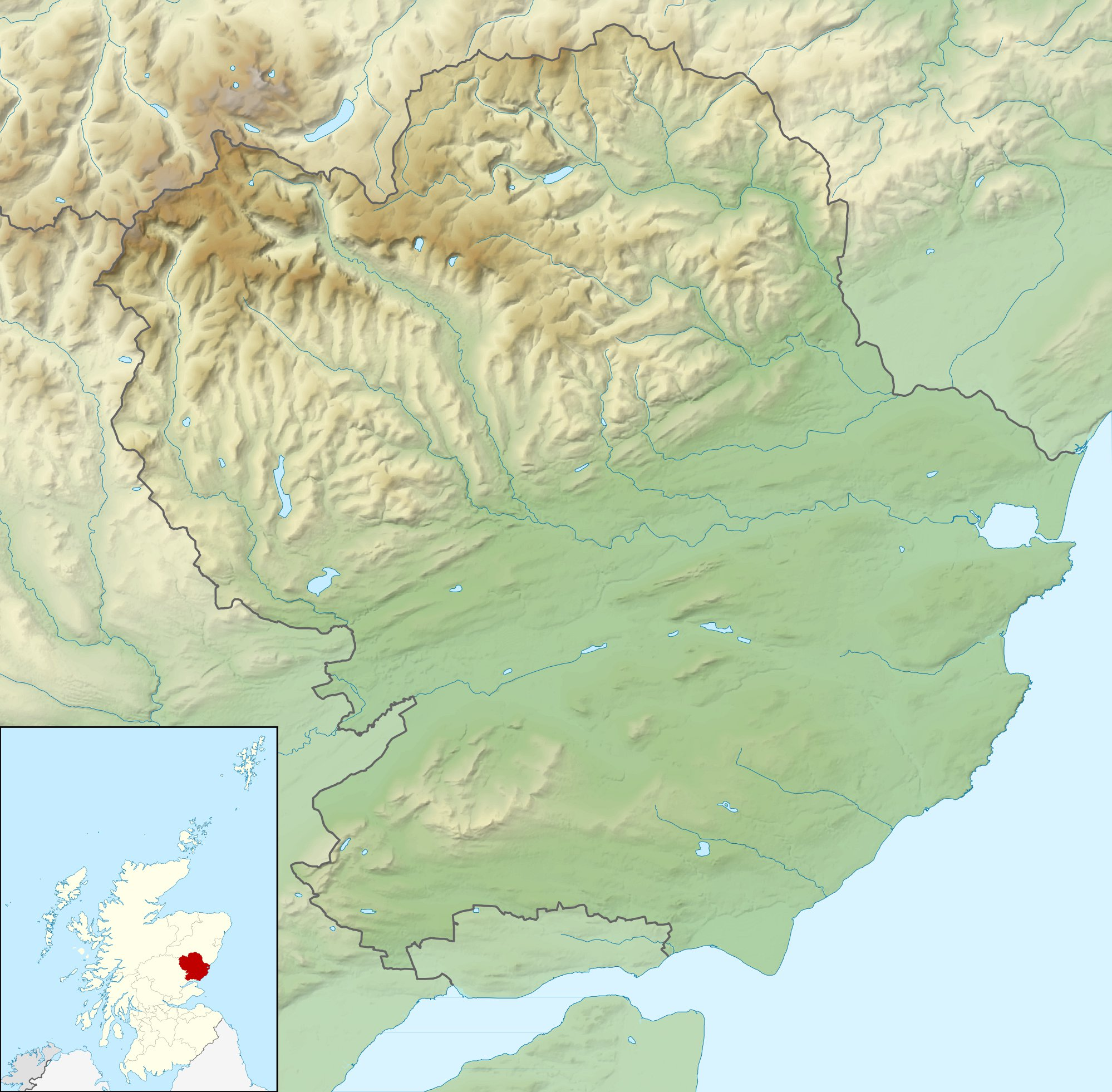
- Location within Angus Location within Perth and Kinross Location within Scotland

The Sidlaws are a range of hills in the counties of Perthshire and Angus in Scotland that extend for 30 miles (45 km) from Kinnoull Hill, near Perth, northeast to Forfar. A continuation of the Ochils, they separate Strathmore to the north from the Carse of Gowrie on the shore of the Tay.

At 1492 feet (455 metres), Craigowl Hill, north of Dundee, is the highest of the Sidlaws. Points of interest include Dunsinane Hill, mentioned in Shakespeare's play Macbeth, and Auchterhouse Hill, which was the site of an ancient hill fort. The ruined observatory on Kinpurnie Hill was built in the 18th century and can be seen for many miles on the Strathmore side of the Sidlaws. There is a local legend that a poacher named Brandon Henderson lived as a hermit in the tower for seven years in order to win a £100 bet.

Sidlaw Hills is also the name of a "Schottische" marching tune composed for the fiddle by Jim Watson of Blairgowrie (1868–1931).

== Geology ==
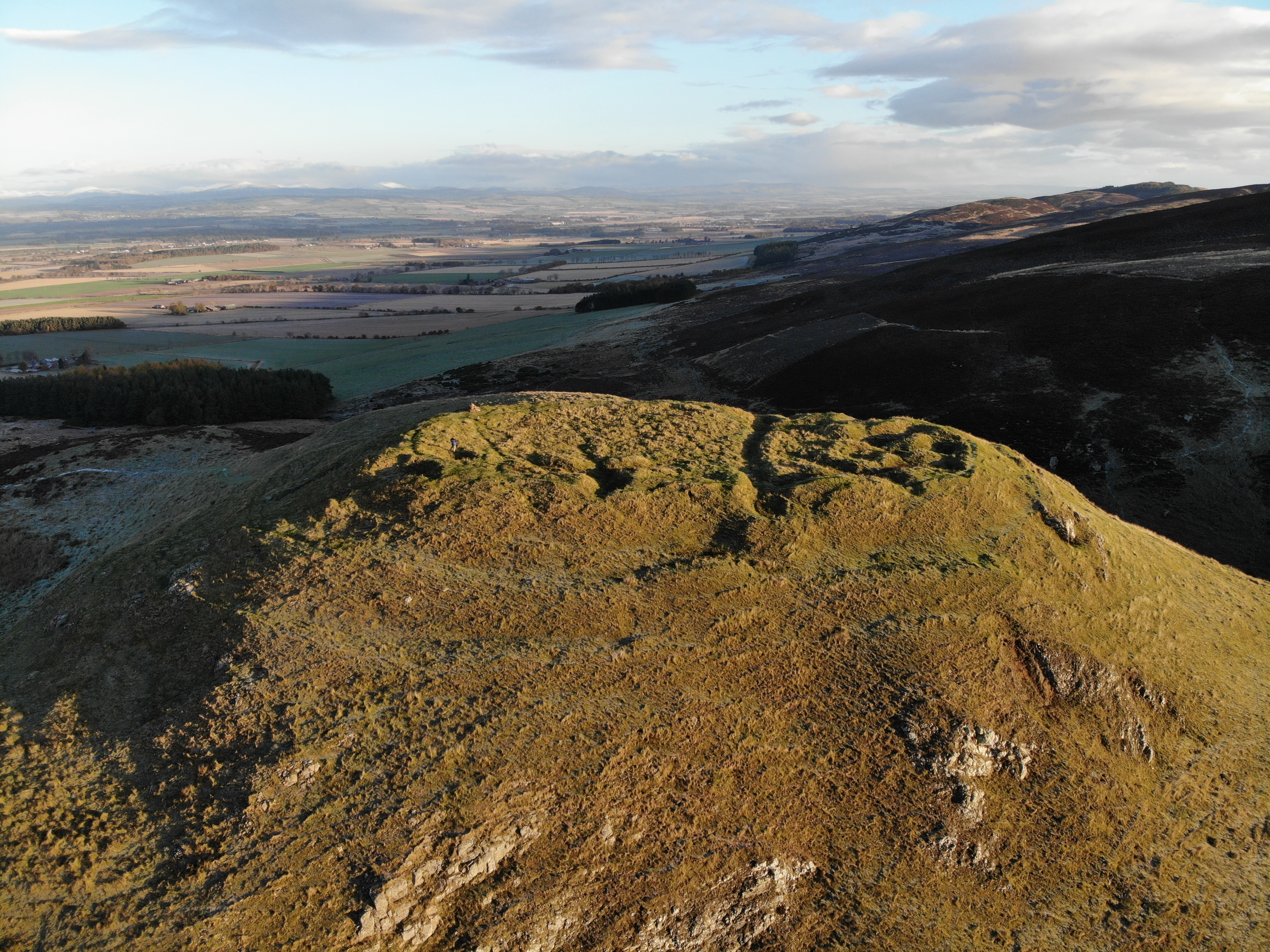
The summit of Dunsinane Hill

The Sidlaws are formed from a mix of igneous and sedimentary rocks originating during the early part of the Devonian period.

The Dundee Flagstones are a mix of slabby and cross-bedded sandstones with some siltstones and mudstones which interleave with the rocks of the overlying Ochil Volcanic Formation. They form the bulk of the hills along the southern margin of the range from Scotston Hill and the eastern slopes of Balkello Hill in the west, through Craigowl Hill, much of Gallow Hill, Ironside Hill and Finlarg Hill to Kincaldrum Hill in the east, together with the outlying Fothringham Hill and Carrot Hill ridge. The Dundee Flagstones were intruded by rocks of the 'Midland Valley Siluro-Devonian Mafic Intrusion Suite'; these outcrop on parts of Auchterhouse and Scotston hills, Blacklaw and West Mains hills.

The Ochil Volcanics form the sometimes craggy King's Seat, Gask Hill, Northballo and Southballo hills and the ridge north and west of Long Loch; Lundie Craigs are a significant southeast facing exposure of this formation. They are also found across the larger part of Carlunie Hill and Berry Hillock together with Kinpurney Hill. The overlying Scone Sandstone forms the hill of Castleward and underlies the low ground of Strathmore to the north.

Much of the lower ground around and within the hills is covered by glacial till, a legacy of the last ice age. Glaciofluvial deposits from the late stages of the ice age and post-glacial alluvium are also widespread.

Beautifully coloured agates, which formed over millions of years in cavities (originally gas bubbles) in the volcanic lava which formed the hills, are occasionally to be found weathered out of the rock in the surrounding fields.

== See also ==
- B954 road
- Gask Hill
- Newtyle Hill
- Wester Denoon
