= Washington (Tayside) railway station =

Short-lived railway station in Ardler, Perth and Kinross

Coordinates: 56°33′48″N 3°11′43″W

Washington

General information
- Location: Washington, Perth and Kinross; Scotland

Other information
- Status: Disused

History
- Original company: Newtyle and Coupar Angus Railway

Key dates
- 24 February 1837: Opened
- 8 September 1847: Closed
Location

Washington railway station served the village of Washington, Perth and Kinross, Scotland, from 1837 to 1847 on the Scottish Midland Junction Railway.

== History ==
The station opened on 24 February 1837 by the Newtyle and Coupar Angus Railway. It was short-lived, closing after 10 years on 8 September 1847 when the track was doubled.

Preceding station	Disused railways	Following station
Alyth Junction; Line and station closed	Newtye and Coupar Angus Railway	Ardler; Line and station closed
