= Golf Club Halt railway station (Scotland) =

Former railway station in Scotland

Golf Club Halt

General information
- Location: Alyth, Perth and Kinross; Scotland
- Coordinates: 56.6203°N 3.204°W
- Platforms: 1

Other information
- Status: Disused

History
- Original company: Caledonian Railway
- Pre-grouping: Caledonian Railway
- Post-grouping: London Midland and Scottish Railway

Key dates
- June 1912: Opened
- 1 Jan.1917: Closed
- Sept.1919: Opened
- 1947: service withdrawn but used unofficially
- 2 July 1951: completely closed
Location

Golf Club Halt was a station which served Alyth Golf Club, in the Scottish county of Perth and Kinross. It was served by trains on the Alyth Railway which ran between Alyth and the Scottish Midland Junction Railway at Alyth Junction. Also known as Pitcrocknie Platform.

== History ==
Opened by the Caledonian Railway in 1912 it became part of the London Midland and Scottish Railway during the Grouping of 1923, Regular service withdrawn in 1947 but used unofficially until line closed in 1951.

Preceding station	Historical railways	Following station
Alyth; Line and station closed	Alyth Railway; Caledonian Railway	Jordanstone; Line and station closed
