= Alyth railway station =

Disused railway station in Alyth, Scotland

Alyth

General information
- Location: Alyth, Perth and Kinross; Scotland
- Coordinates: 56.61954°N 3.22547°W
- Platforms: ?

Other information
- Status: Disused

History
- Original company: Alyth Railway
- Pre-grouping: Caledonian Railway
- Post-grouping: London, Midland and Scottish Railway

Key dates
- 12 August 1861: Opened
- 2 July 1951: Closed
Location

The Alyth railway station served the town of Alyth in the Scottish county of Perth and Kinross. The station was the terminus of a branch line from Alyth Junction on the Scottish Midland Junction Railway that ran between Perth and Arbroath.

== History ==
Opened by the Alyth Railway on 12 August 1861 and absorbed into the Caledonian Railway, it became part of the London, Midland and Scottish Railway during the grouping of 1923. Passing on to the Scottish Region of British Railways upon nationalisation in 1948, it was then closed by British Railways on 2 July 1951.

Preceding station	Historical railways	Following station
Terminus	Alyth Railway; Caledonian Railway	Golf Club Halt; Line and station closed
