= Eassie railway station =

Disused railway station in Eassie, Angus

Eassie
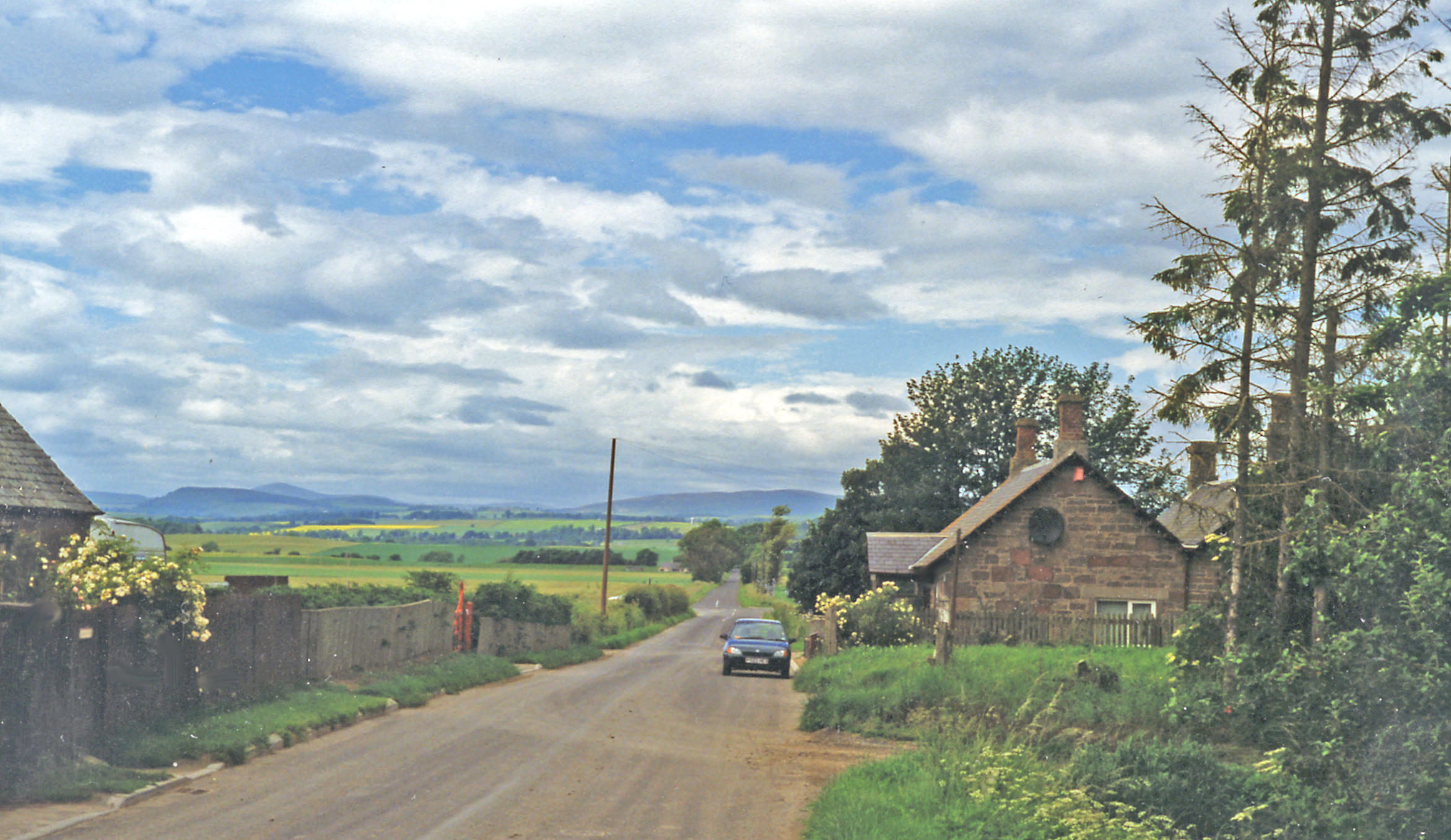
- The site of the station in 1997

General information
- Location: Eassie, Angus; Scotland
- Coordinates: 56.6097°N 3.0659°W
- Grid reference: NO346469
- Platforms: 2

Other information
- Status: Disused

History
- Original company: Scottish Midland Junction Railway
- Pre-grouping: Caledonian Railway
- Post-grouping: London, Midland and Scottish Railway

Key dates
- 4 June 1838: Opened
- 11 June 1956: Closed
Location

Eassie railway station served the village of Eassie, Angus, Scotland from 1838 to 1956 on the Scottish Midland Junction Railway.

== History ==
The station opened on 4 June 1838 by the Newtyle, Eassie and Glamiss Railway but disappeared from the timetable in October 1847. It reopened on 2 August 1848. It closed to both passengers and goods traffic on 11 June 1956.

Preceding station	Disused railways	Following station
Kirkinch; Line and station closed	Scottish Midland Junction Railway	Leason Hill; Line and station closed
