= Meigle Junction railway station =

Disused railway station in Meigle, Perth and Kinross

Coordinates: 56°34′24″N 3°09′04″W

Meigle Junction

General information
- Location: Meigle, Perth and Kinross; England
- Platforms: 2

Other information
- Status: Disused

History
- Original company: Scottish Midland Junction Railway
- Pre-grouping: Scottish Midland Junction Railway

Key dates
- 2 August 1848: Opened
- June 1861: Closed
Location

Meigle Junction railway station served the village of Meigle, Perth and Kinross, Scotland, from 1848 to 1861 on the Scottish Midland Junction Railway.

== History ==
The station opened on 2 August 1848 by the Scottish Midland Junction Railway. It opened with an interchange. This allowed goods sidings to reverse into the sidings then continue on to Coupar Angus. The station closed in June 1861.

Preceding station	Disused railways	Following station
Kirkinch; Line and station closed	Scottish Midland Junction Railway	Alyth Junction; Line and station closed
