= Blairgowrie railway station =

Disused railway station in Blairgowrie and Rattray, Perth and Kinross

Blairgowrie
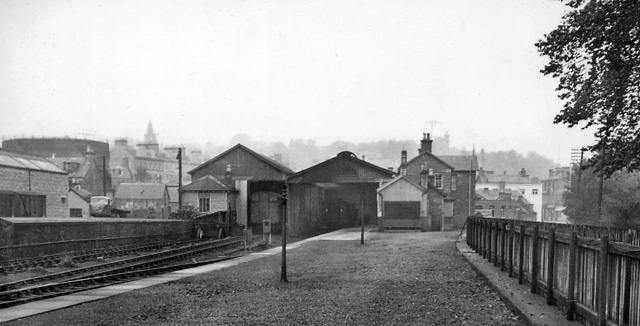
- The station in 1961

General information
- Location: Blairgowrie and Rattray, Perth and Kinross; Scotland
- Coordinates: 56.5904°N 3.335°W
- Grid reference: NO181450
- Platforms: 2

Other information
- Status: Disused

History
- Original company: Scottish Midland Junction Railway
- Pre-grouping: Caledonian Railway
- Post-grouping: London, Midland and Scottish Railway

Key dates
- 1 August 1855: Opened
- 10 January 1955: Closed to passengers
- 6 December 1965: Closed completely
Location

Blairgowrie railway station served the burgh of Blairgowrie and Rattray, Perth and Kinross, Scotland from 1855 to 1955 on the Scottish Midland Junction Railway.

== History ==
The station opened on 1 August 1855 by the Scottish Midland Junction Railway, situated on a branch line from Coupar Angus.

It closed to passengers on 10 January 1955 and goods traffic on 6 December 1965. Its former location is now the site of a Tesco supermarket; nearby streets retain railway-themed names.

Preceding station	Disused railways	Following station
Terminus	Scottish Midland Junction Railway; Blairgowrie Branch	Rosemount Halt; Line and station closed
