= Newtyle railway station (old) =

Disused railway station in Newtyle, Angus

Newtyle
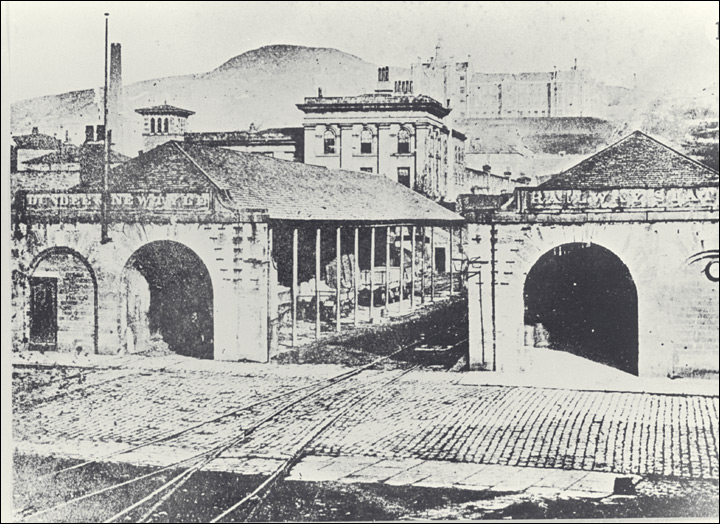

General information
- Location: Newtyle, Angus; Scotland
- Coordinates: 56.559°N 3.1411°W
- Grid reference: NO299413

Other information
- Status: Disused

History
- Original company: Dundee and Newtyle Railway

Key dates
- 16 December 1831: Opened
- 31 August 1868: Closed
Location

Newtyle railway station served the village of Newtyle, Angus, Scotland from 1832 to 1866 on the Dundee and Newtyle Railway.

== History ==
The station opened on 16 December 1831 by the Dundee and Newtyle Railway. It was the northern terminus of the line at the time situated north of Hatton station. The station closed, being replaced by the new Newtyle station, on 30 August 1866.

Preceding station	Historical railways	Following station
Terminus	Dundee and Newtyle Railway	Hatton
