= Ardler railway station =

Disused railway station in Scotland

Ardler
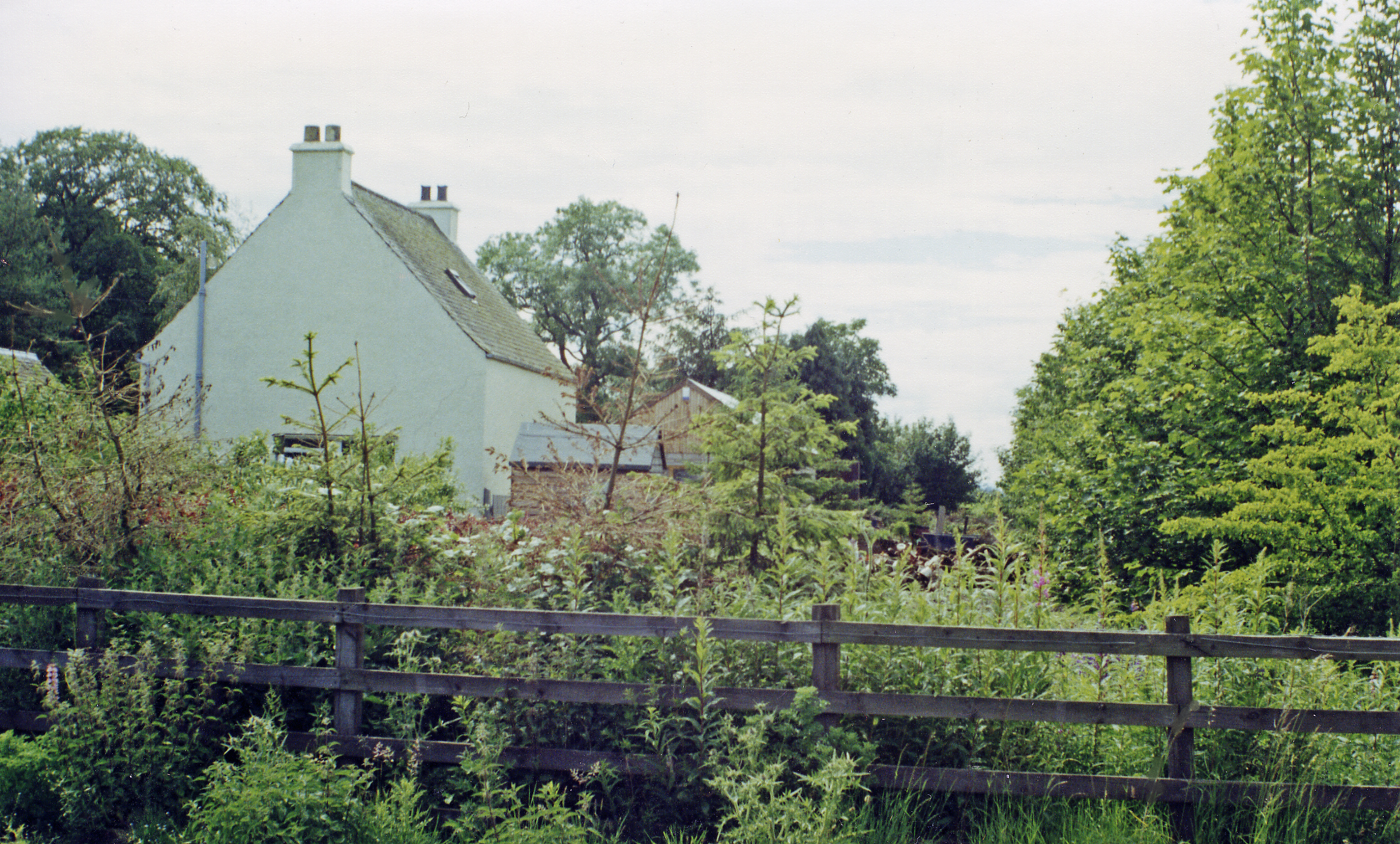
- Remains of the station in 1997

General information
- Location: Perth and Kinross; Scotland
- Coordinates: 56.56094°N 3.20535°W
- Grid reference: NO260417
- Platforms: 2

Other information
- Status: Disused

History
- Original company: Scottish Midland Junction Railway
- Pre-grouping: Caledonian Railway
- Post-grouping: London Midland and Scottish Railway

Key dates
- February 1837: Station opens
- 11 June 1956: Station closes
Location

Ardler railway station served the village of Ardler in the Scottish county of Perth and Kinross. Its proximity to Alyth Junction made it part of the divergence of the Dundee and Newtyle Railway from the Scottish Midland Junction Railway running between Perth and Arbroath.

== History ==
Opened by the Scottish Midland Junction Railway, and absorbed into the Caledonian Railway, it became part of the London, Midland and Scottish Railway during the Grouping of 1923. Passing on to the Scottish Region of British Railways on nationalisation in 1948, it was then closed by the British Transport Commission.

Preceding station	Historical railways	Following station
Coupar Angus	Caledonian Railway; Scottish Midland Junction Railway	Alyth Junction
Junction with SMJR	Caledonian Railway; Dundee and Newtyle Railway	Newtyle
