= Cargill railway station =

Disused railway station in Scotland

Cargill
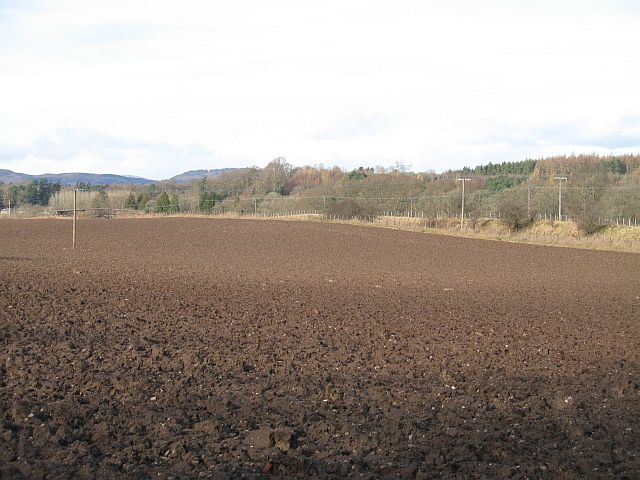
- The site of the station in 2008

General information
- Location: Scotland
- Coordinates: 56.5199°N 3.3624°W
- Grid reference: NO162372
- Platforms: 2

Other information
- Status: Disused

History
- Original company: Scottish Midland Junction Railway
- Pre-grouping: Caledonian Railway
- Post-grouping: London, Midland and Scottish Railway

Key dates
- 2 August 1848: Station opened
- 11 June 1956: Station closed
Location

Cargill railway station was in the Scottish county of Perth and Kinross. The station was opened by the Scottish Midland Junction Railway running between Perth and Arbroath.

== History ==
Opened by the Scottish Midland Junction Railway, which was later absorbed by the Caledonian Railway, it became part of the London, Midland and Scottish Railway during the Grouping of 1923. Passing on to the Scottish Region of British Railways on nationalisation in 1948, it was then closed by the British Transport Commission.

Preceding station	Historical railways	Following station
Stanley	Caledonian Railway; Scottish Midland Junction Railway	Woodside and Burrelton
