= Fullerton railway station =

Fullerton railway station could refer to:

United Kingdom

- Fullerton Junction railway station, known as Fullerton station 1871–1889 and 1929-1964, in England
- Meigle railway station, formerly known as Fullerton station 1861–1876, in Scotland

United States

- Fullerton Transportation Center, in Fullerton, California
