= Burrelton =

Coordinates: 56.518195°N 3.303398°W

- War memorial and green, Burrelton

- Location within Perth and Kinross
- Population: 720 (2020)
- OS grid reference: NO199370
- Civil parish: Burrelton-Cargill
- Council area: Perth and Kinross
- Lieutenancy area: Perth and Kinross
- Country: Scotland
- Sovereign state: United Kingdom
- Post town: BLAIRGOWRIE
- Postcode district: PH13
- Dialling code: 01828
- Police: Scotland
- Fire: Scottish
- Ambulance: Scottish
- UK Parliament: Angus and Perthshire Glens
- Scottish Parliament: Perth Mid Scotland and Fife

Burrelton is a small village in Perth and Kinross, Scotland. It lies in the parish of Cargill, 2 miles (3 kilometres) from Coupar Angus and 10 miles (16 kilometres) from Perth. It is adjoined by another, smaller village, Woodside. The population in 2001 was 621.

A planned village, Burrelton was founded in 1812 by Peter Drummond-Burrel, the laird of Stobhall.

== Education ==
The village is home to a small primary school called Burrelton Primary School. Pupils typically progress to one of the associated high schools, Perth Academy or Blairgowie High School.

== Transportation ==
Woodside and Burrelton railway station was opened by the Caledonian Railway, on the former Scottish Midland Junction Railway, running between Perth and Arbroath. It became part of the London, Midland and Scottish Railway during the Grouping of 1923. Passing on to the Scottish Region of British Railways on nationalisation in 1948, it was then closed by the British Transport Commission.

== Notable residents ==
- James Lamond, former Labour MP, was born here in 1928
- Bill Walker, former Conservative MP, lived close to the village
