= Meigle railway station =

Former railway station in Scotland

Meigle

General information
- Location: Meigle, Perth and Kinross; Scotland
- Coordinates: 56.5885°N 3.1584°W
- Platforms: ?

Other information
- Status: Disused

History
- Original company: Alyth Railway
- Pre-grouping: Caledonian Railway
- Post-grouping: London, Midland and Scottish Railway

Key dates
- 12 August 1861: Opened as Fullerton
- 1 November 1876: Renamed as Meigle
- 2 July 1951: Closed
Location

Meigle railway station served the village of Meigle in the Scottish county of Perth and Kinross. The station was on the Alyth Railway from Alyth Junction on the Scottish Midland Junction Railway running between Perth and Arbroath.

== History ==
Opened by the Alyth Railway on 12 August 1861 as Fullarton, and renamed to Meigle on 1 November 1876 when the station on the same name on the Scottish Midland Junction Railway was renamed to Alyth Junction. It was absorbed into the Caledonian Railway, it became part of the London, Midland and Scottish Railway during the Grouping of 1923. Passing on to the Scottish Region of British Railways on nationalisation in 1948, it was then closed by British Railways on 2 July 1951.

Preceding station	Historical railways	Following station
Jordanstone; Line and station closed	Alyth Railway; Caledonian Railway	Alyth Junction; Line and station closed
