= Leason Hill railway station =

Short-lived railway station in Newmill of Inshewan, Angus

Coordinates: 56°36′02″N 3°05′20″W

Leason Hill

General information
- Location: Newmill of Inshewan, Angus; Scotland

Other information
- Status: Disused

History
- Original company: Newtyle, Eassie and Glamiss Railway
- Pre-grouping: Scottish Midland Junction Railway

Key dates
- 4 June 1838: Opened
- October 1847: Closed
Location

Leason Hill railway station served the area of Newmill of Inshewan, Angus, Scotland, from 1838 to 1847 on the Newtyle, Eassie and Glamiss Railway.

== History ==
The station opened on 4 June 1838 by the Newtyle, Eassie and Glamiss Railway. It was short-lived, only being open for 9 years before closing in October 1847.

Preceding station	Disused railways	Following station
Kirkinch; Line and station closed	Newtyle, Eassie and Glamiss Railway	Eassie; Line and station closed
