= Ardler, Perth and Kinross =

Village in Perth and Kinross, Scotland

Coordinates: 56.5642°N 3.1976°W

Ardler
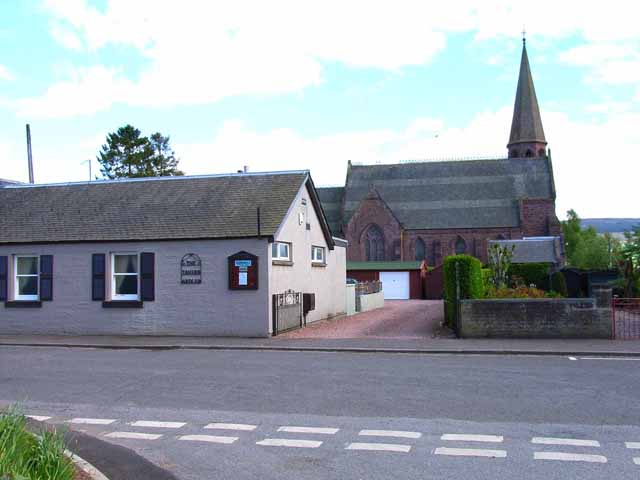
- Pub and kirk

- Location within Perth and Kinross
- Council area: Perth and Kinross
- Lieutenancy area: Perth and Kinross
- Country: Scotland
- Sovereign state: United Kingdom
- Police: Scotland
- Fire: Scottish
- Ambulance: Scottish

Ardler is a small village in Perth and Kinross, Scotland. It is situated approximately 3 miles (5 kilometres) east of Coupar Angus, and approximately equidistant between the latter and Meigle.

== History ==
The present village evolved from a planned railway village called Washington, planned in 1835 in connection with the Dundee and Newtyle Railway. After initial building works Washington failed to expand as had been expected. In his history of the village Christopher H. Dingwall attributed this to the decline of the rural textile industry and the rapid expansion of railways meaning that Washington quickly lost its advantage of being one of the few settlements in the area connected to a railway. Railway rebuilding as part of the construction of the Scottish Midland Junction Railway led to the removal of the station at Washington village and its replacement with a station called Ardler slightly further away from the village. Following the establishment of a church and the foundation of the Parish of Ardler in 1885, the name Ardler superseded that of Washington.

The church at Ardler was erected in memory of James Drummond Carmichael (1849-1881) by his father Peter Carmichael, a Dundee textile mill manager and senior partner in Baxter Brothers & Co Ltd. Peter Carmichael family had purchased the nearby Arthurstone estate in 1869 and expanded it to include other nearby farms including East and West Ardler.

The village primary school, which dates from the 1830s, closed in the late 1980s. In 2020, a plan to convert the school into two homes was given the go-ahead.
