= David Carmichael (railway engineer) =

Scottish railway engineer

- Born: c. 1818; Dundee
- Died: 1895; Dundee
- Parent: Charles Carmichael
- Engineering career
- Discipline: Railway engineer
- Employers: Ward Foundry, James Carmichael and Co
- Projects: first railway locomotive in Scotland, Dundee and Newtyle Railway

David Carmichael was a Scottish railway engineer, born in Dundee c. 1818. He died in Dundee on 5 April 1895, aged 77.

== Life ==
He was the son of the engineer James Carmichael (1776-1853) who operated an engineering company with David's uncle, Charles Carmichael (1782-1843).

He was raised at his father's house at Fleuchar Craig but then lived independently at Cherryfield Cottage in Dundee.

As a mechanical engineer, he was linked to his father's firm of James Carmichael & Co (later renamed Ward Foundry), builders of one of the first railway locomotives in Scotland in 1833. This engine - the Earl of Airlie - was an 0-2-4 for the Dundee and Newtyle Railway and the first British locomotive to have a bogie (a wheeled wagon or truck attached to the railway engine). Under the Whyte notation for the classification of steam locomotives, 0-2-4 represents the wheel arrangement of no leading wheels, two powered driving wheels on one axle, and four trailing wheels on two axles. This is a most unusual wheel arrangement, with the only known examples being three locomotives, all supplied to the Dundee and Newtyle Railway by J. Carmichael in 1833.

Carmichael was the third son of Charles Carmichael, who developed and introduced a valve gear modification of a single fixed eccentric (the valve gear of a steam engine is the mechanism that operates the inlet and exhaust valves to admit steam into the cylinder at the correct point in the cycle) in 1818. He was apprenticed at his father's works before moving to Bristol as a draughtsman, and later to the dockyard at Woolwich. He returned to Dundee in 1849 to join his cousin George Carmichael at Ward Foundry. The Foundry closed in 1929. The Railwayman's Club at Guthrie Street, Dundee, is on the site of the former Ward Foundry offices and is now a listed building.
