= Woodside, Perth and Kinross =

Coordinates: 56.523635°N 3.298708°W

Woodside
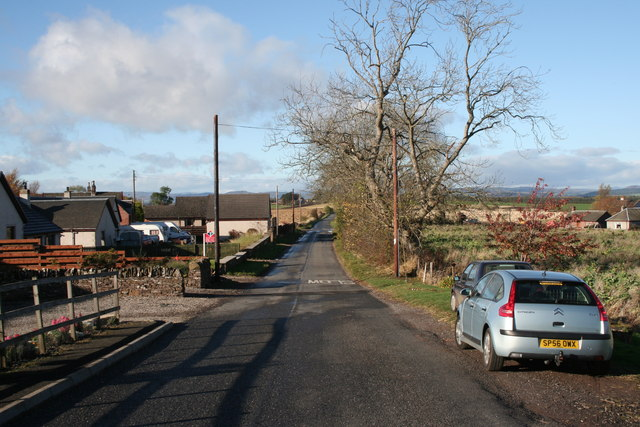
- Exiting Woodside

- Location within Perth and Kinross
- OS grid reference: NO202376
- Civil parish: Cargill
- Council area: Perth and Kinross
- Lieutenancy area: Perth and Kinross
- Country: Scotland
- Sovereign state: United Kingdom
- Post town: BLAIRGOWRIE
- Postcode district: PH13
- Dialling code: 01828
- Police: Scotland
- Fire: Scottish
- Ambulance: Scottish
- UK Parliament: Angus and Perthshire Glens
- Scottish Parliament: Perth Mid Scotland and Fife

Woodside is a small village in Scotland, 12 miles (19 kilometres) from Perth, in the Perth and Kinross council area. It adjoins another village, Burrelton. It is 2 miles (3 kilometres) from Coupar Angus, the nearest town.

The population of Woodside in 1971 was 160.

Woodside used to have a train station, part of the London, Midland and Scottish Railway. The station was known as the Woodside and Burrelton railway station. The Cargill-Burrelton parish church is also located in Woodside.

The village is also home to the local Scottish Amateur Football Association side Burrelton Rovers A.F.C, who play at the Recreation Ground.

== Notable residents ==
- John Swinney, current First Minister, Scottish National Party
