= SMJR =

SMJR may refer to:

- Stratford-upon-Avon and Midland Junction Railway
- Scottish Midland Junction Railway
