= Stormont Loch Halt railway station =

Disused railway station in Stormont, Perth and Kinross

Coordinates: 56°34′04″N 3°18′43″W

Stormont Loch Halt

General information
- Location: Stormont, Perth and Kinross; Scotland
- Platforms: 1

Other information
- Status: Disused

History
- Original company: Caledonian Railway
- Pre-grouping: Caledonian Railway
- Post-grouping: London, Midland and Scottish Railway; British Railways (Scottish Region)

Key dates
- 1920: Opened
- 1955: Closed

Stormont Loch Halt railway station served the area of Stormont, Perth and Kinross, Scotland from 1920 to 1955 on the Scottish Midland Junction Railway.

== History ==
The station opened in 1920 by the Scottish Midland Junction Railway. It was used earlier in June and July 1919 for school parties. It closed in 1955.

Preceding station	Disused railways	Following station
Coupar Angus; Line and station closed	Scottish Midland Junction Railway	Rosemount Halt; Line and station closed
