= Rosemount Halt railway station =

Disused railway station in Rosemount, Perth and Kinross

Coordinates: 56.5739°N 3.3192°W

Rosemount Halt

General information
- Location: Rosemount, Perth and Kinross; Scotland
- Platforms: 1

Other information
- Status: Disused

History
- Original company: Scottish Midland Junction Railway
- Pre-grouping: Caledonian Railway
- Post-grouping: London, Midland and Scottish Railway; British Railways (Scottish Region)

Key dates
- September 1857: Opened as Rosemount
- 1938: Name changed to Rosemount Halt
- 10 January 1955: Closed
Location

Rosemount Halt railway station served the suburb of Rosemount, Perth and Kinross, Scotland, from 1857 to 1955 on the Scottish Midland Junction Railway.

== History ==
The station opened as Rosemount in September 1857 by the Scottish Midland Junction Railway. It was situated south of a level crossing and it had a timber waiting room. The station's name was changed to Rosemount Halt in 1938. It closed on 10 January 1955.

Preceding station	Disused railways	Following station
Stormont Loch Halt; Line and station closed	Scottish Midland Junction Railway	Blairgowrie; Line and station closed
