= Woodside and Burrelton railway station =

Disused railway station in Scotland

Woodside and Burrelton
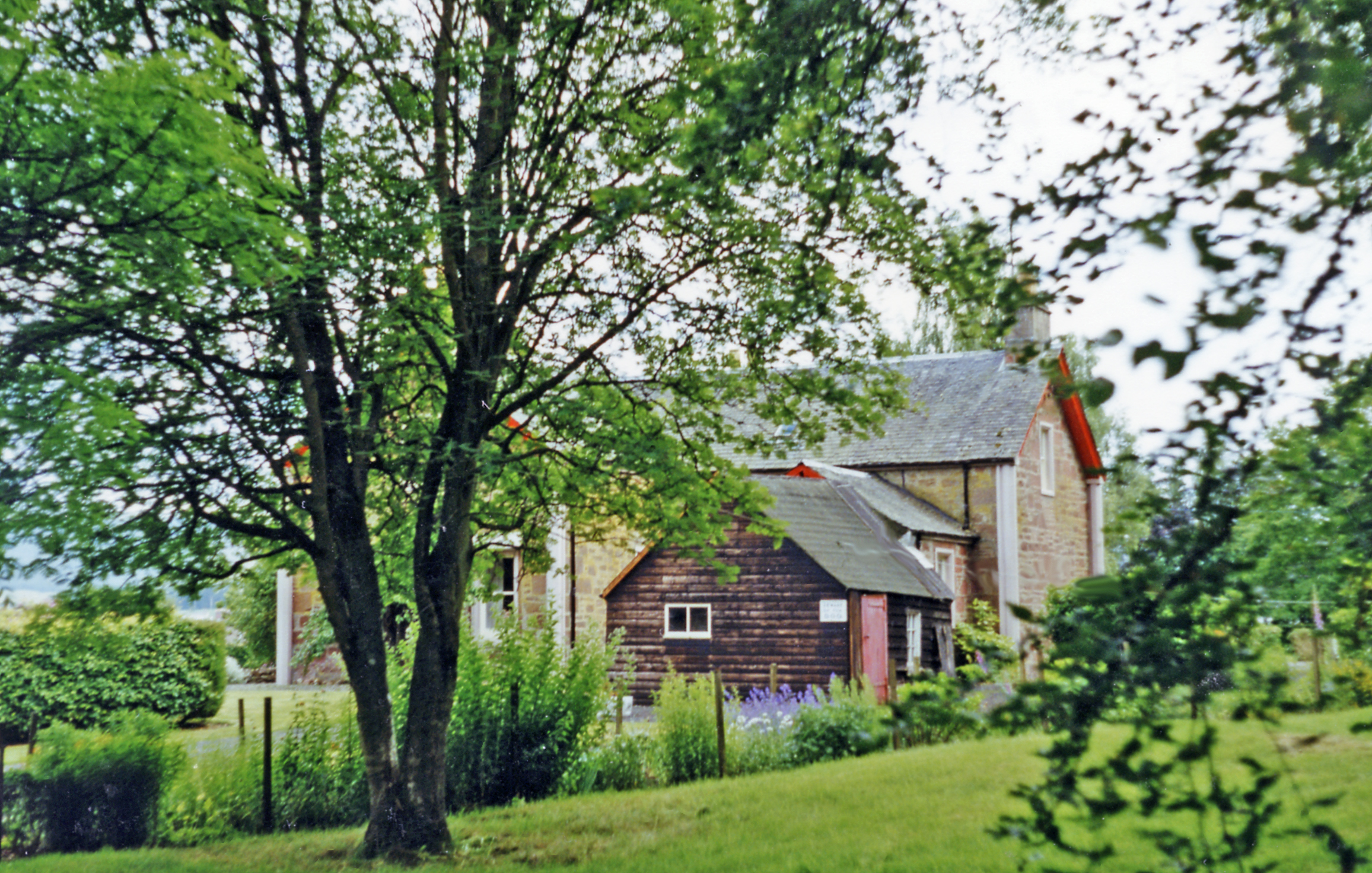
- Former Burrelton station house, 1997

General information
- Location: Scotland
- Coordinates: 56.5262°N 3.3041°W
- Grid reference: NO198378
- Platforms: 2

Other information
- Status: Disused

History
- Original company: Caledonian Railway
- Post-grouping: London, Midland and Scottish Railway

Key dates
- 1 October 1905: Station opened as Woodside and Burrelton
- 1 September 1927: Station renamed as Burrelton
- 11 June 1956: Station closed
Location

Woodside and Burrelton railway station was located in Burrelton in the Scottish county of Perth and Kinross. The station was opened by the Caledonian Railway on the former Scottish Midland Junction Railway running between Perth and Arbroath.

== History ==
Opened by the Caledonian Railway, it became part of the London, Midland and Scottish Railway during the Grouping of 1923. Passing on to the Scottish Region of British Railways on nationalisation in 1948, it was then closed by the British Transport Commission.

Preceding station	Historical railways	Following station
Cargill	Caledonian Railway	Coupar Angus
