= Earl of Airlie (locomotive) =

Steam locomotive

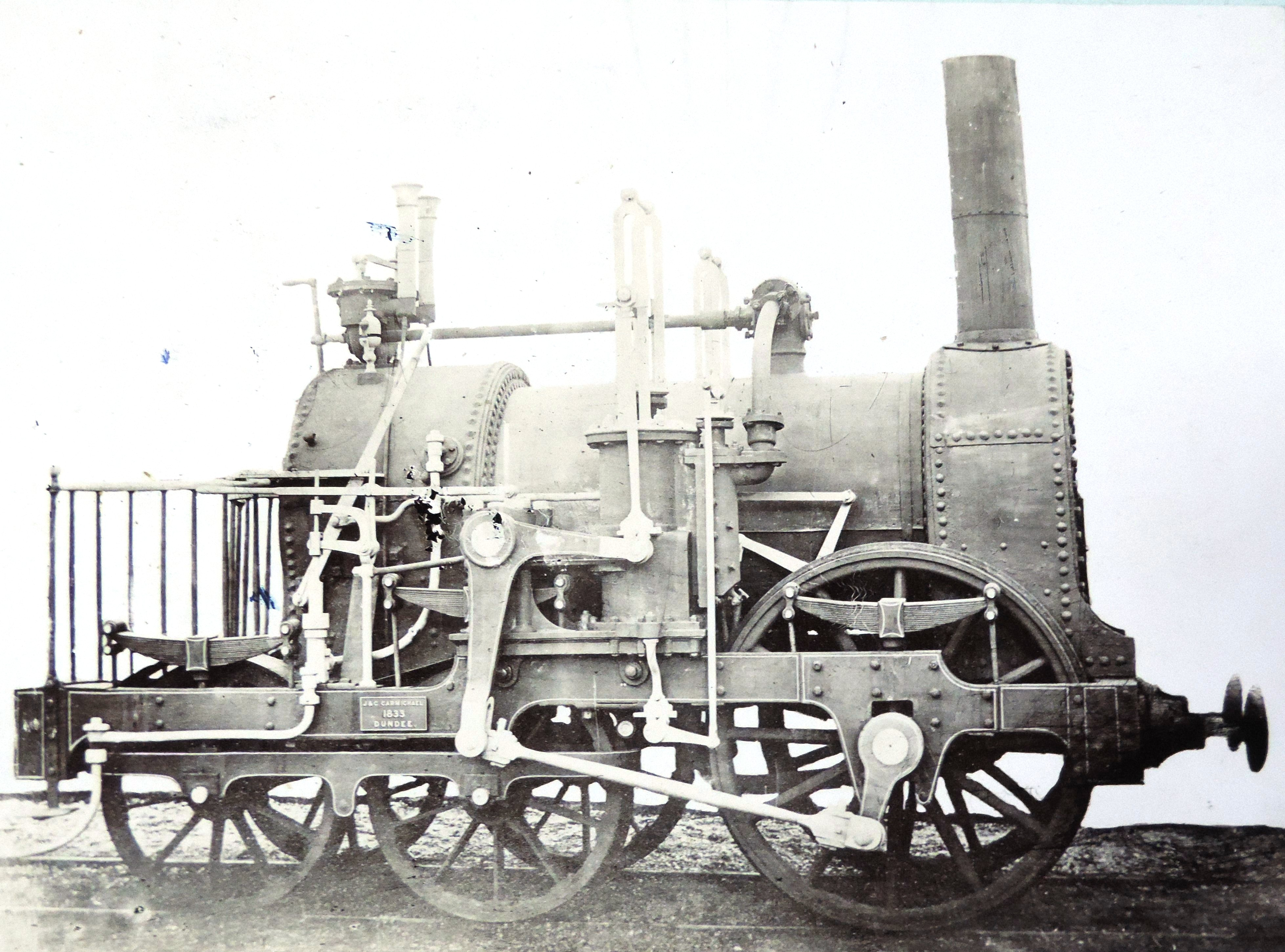
- Earl of Airlie, in the mid 1860s
Type and origin
- Power type: Steam
- Designer: J and C Carmichael
- Builder: J and C Carmichael
- Build date: 1833
- Total produced: 2 (possibly 3)
Specifications
- Configuration
  - Whyte: 0-2-4
- Driver: 1st
- Gauge: 4 ft 6 in (1,372 mm)
- Coupled dia.: 5 feet 4 inches (163 cm)
- Trailing dia.: 3 feet (91 cm)
- Total weight: 9 long tons 10 cwt (21,300 lb or 9.7 t)
- Fuel type: Coal
- Cylinders: 2
- Cylinder size: 11 by 18 inches (28 by 46 cm)
Career
- First run: 29 September 1833

Earl of Airlie was an 1833 steam locomotive designed and built by J and C Carmichael for the 4ft 6in gauge Dundee and Newtyle Railway, with a 0-2-4 wheel arrangement and a tender. It was the first steam passenger locomotive in Scotland, the first locomotive in the United Kingdom to have a bogie, and the only 0-2-4 locomotive ever built.

A second locomotive, of the same design, Lord Wharncliffe was completed shortly after Earl of Airlie. A third 0-2-4, Trotter, was provided by James Stirling & Co. in 1834, to a similar but sightly smaller design.

No other locomotives ever used the 0-2-4 arrangement.

== Background ==
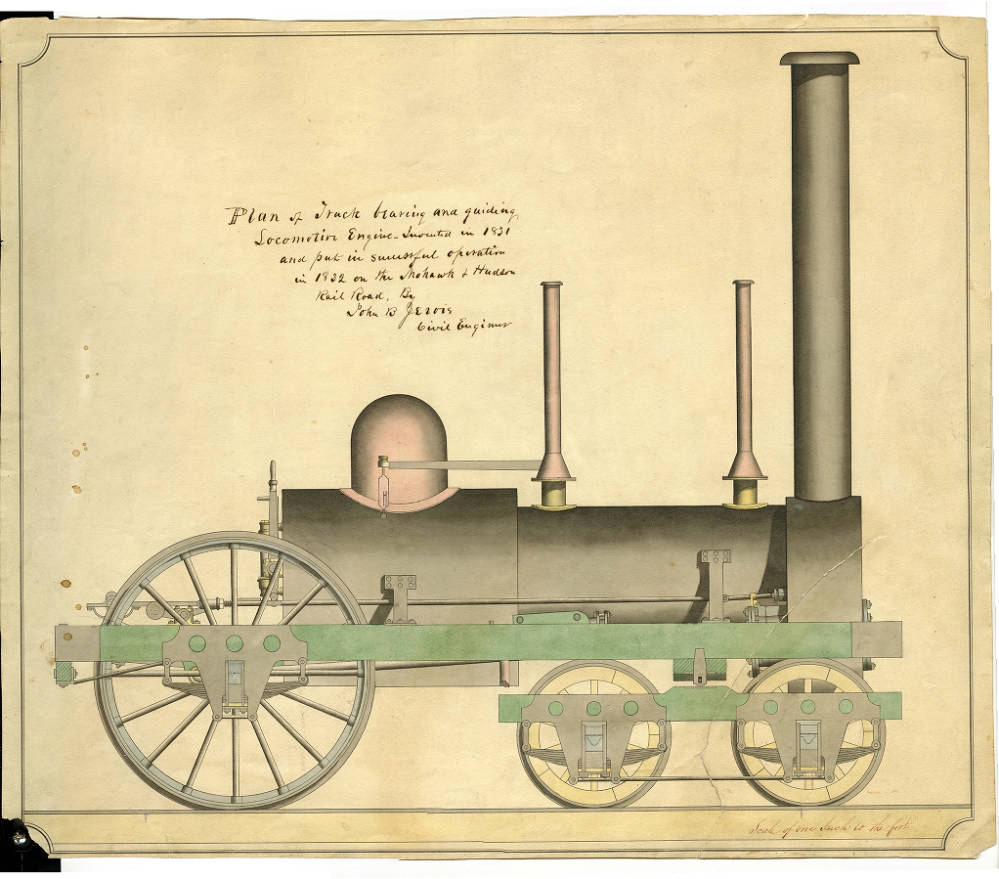
Jervis' 4-2-0 Experiment of 1832, as built

The first railway locomotive to run in Scotland, The Duke, was introduced on the Kilmarnock and Troon Railway in 1817 or early 1818, to haul coal. It was not a success.

The first locomotive in the world with a bogie, invented by John B. Jervis was Experiment (later renamed Brother Jonathan), a 4-2-0 design for the Mohawk and Hudson Railroad in the United States, in 1832.

The Dundee and Newtyle Railway opened in part in December 1831, and in full on 3 April 1832. It was built to 4 ft 6 in (1,372 mm) and converted to 1,435 mm (4 ft 8 1/2 in) in 1849, having been leased to the Dundee and Perth Railway in 1846. The Dundee and Perth Railway was in turn absorbed by the Scottish Central Railway in 1863.

== Design ==
Earl of Airlie had an 0-2-4 (Whyte notation) wheel arrangement, meaning that it had no leading wheels, two powered driving wheels on one axle, and four trailing wheels on two axles. These latter pair of axles were on the bogie. This was the first use of a bogie on a locomotive in the United Kingdom. The driving wheels were 5 feet 4 inches (163 cm) in diameter, (Note: Ahrons and others say 5 feet (150 cm)) the bogie wheels 3 feet (91 cm). It used two vertical, single-acting cylinders of 11 by 18 inches (28 by 46 cm), one on each side of the boiler, mounted on top of the outside frames and driving the front wheels through bell cranks. Steam was provided by a fire-tube boiler at a working pressure of 50 pounds per square inch (340 kPa).

The locomotive weighed 9 long tons 10 cwt (21,300 lb or 9.7 t) and cost £700 (equivalent to £72,040 in 2025) to build. It was delivered from its maker, J and C Carmichael, on 22 September 1833, along with a separate tender comprising a wagon with a water-barrel affixed, costing £30.

=== Similar locomotives ===
Lord Wharncliffe, also made by J and C Carmichael, differed in having cylinders of 11.25 by 18 inches (28.6 by 45.7 cm). It was delivered on 25 September 1833.

A third locomotive, Trotter, was delivered to the Dundee and Newtyle Railway by James Stirling and Co. on 3 March 1834 and had driving wheels of 4 feet 6 inches (137 cm), though these were subsequently changed to 4 feet 8 inches (142 cm). It weighed 7 long tons 3 cwt 2 qr (16,070 lb or 7.29 t).

== Name ==
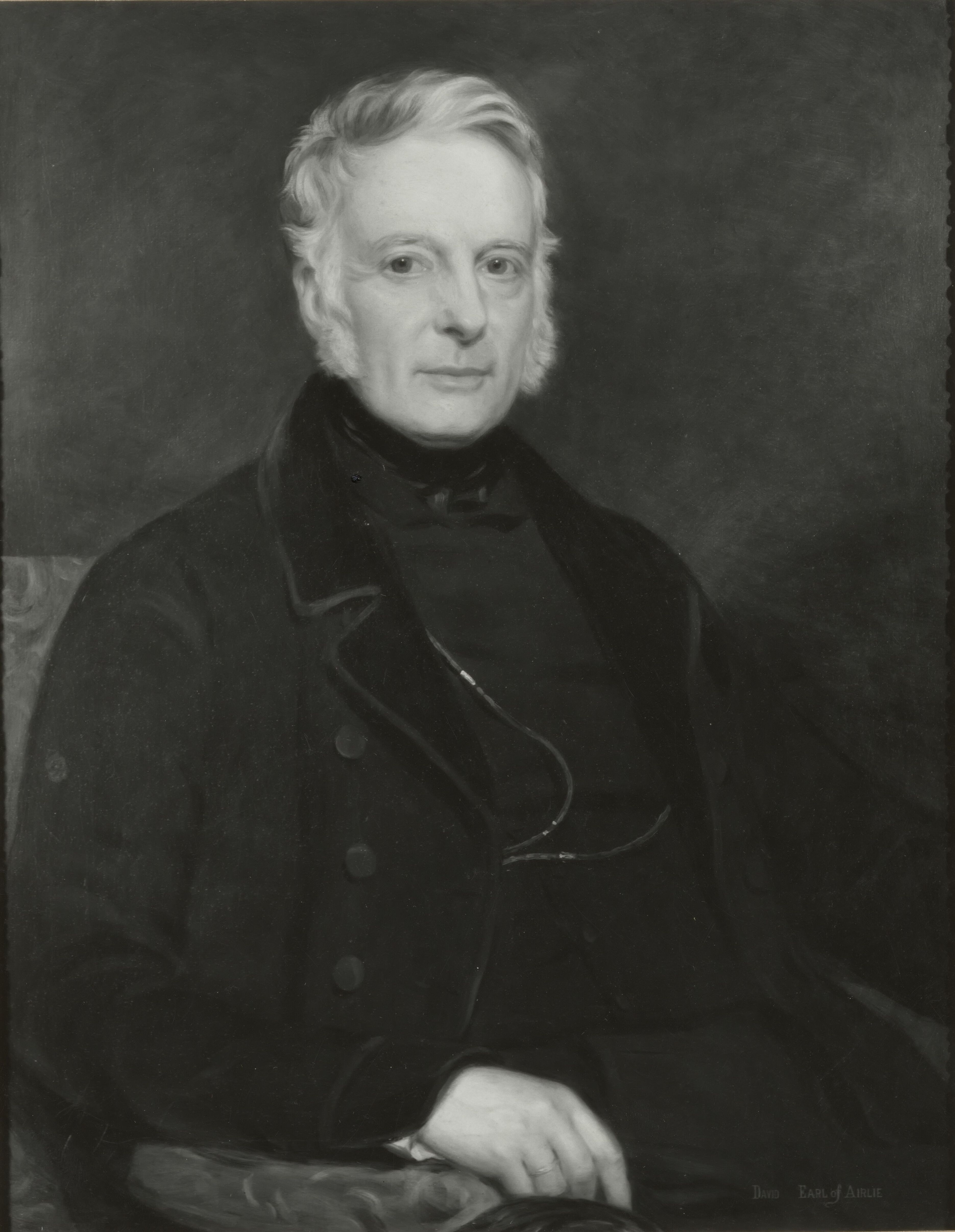
David Ogilvy, 9th Earl Of Airlie (1785-1849), painted by William Deey

The Earl of Airlie at the time of the locomotive's introduction was David Ogilvy (1785–1849), the 9th Earl, who had succeeded to the title in 1819. Lord Wharncliffe was James Stuart-Wortley (1776–1845), the 1st Baron Wharncliffe. Both men were directors of the railway company, as well as being landowners in the area through which the line ran.

The locomotives were numbered by the Dundee and Newtyle Railway as No. 1, No. 2 and No. 3, in order of delivery. The first two were renumbered No. 10 and No. 11 respectively by the Dundee and Perth Railway in 1850.

== Later use ==
Earl of Airlie and Lord Wharncliffe were converted to run on standard gauge when the line was converted in 1849 (Trotter was scrapped), under the auspices of the Dundee and Perth Railway.

The two regauged locomotives operated until 1854. (Note: Ahrons says 1850) After being taken out of service, Earl of Airlie was used as a stationary engine, pumping water at Errol railway station. Lord Wharncliffe was used for similar purposes at the company's workshop at Seabraes, Dundee.

Around a decade later, Alexander Allan, who became locomotive superintendent of the Scottish Central Railway in 1863, recognised its significance of Earl of Airlie. He had it removed, cleaned, cosmetically restored (albeit with the wrong type of buffers; sprung, instead of horse-hair filled), painted, and then photographed. However, it was not preserved.

== Model ==
An accurate ¾-inch scale (3½ inch gauge) working model of Earl of Airlie made by H. Thomas was awarded a Bronze Medal at the Model Engineer Exhibition of 1981. It was sold by auction by Christie's in April 2003 for a hammer price of £5,875.
