= 0-2-4 =

Locomotive wheel arrangement

Under the Whyte notation for the classification of steam locomotives, 0-2-4 represents the wheel arrangement of no leading wheels, two powered driving wheels on one axle, and four trailing wheels on two axles.

== History ==
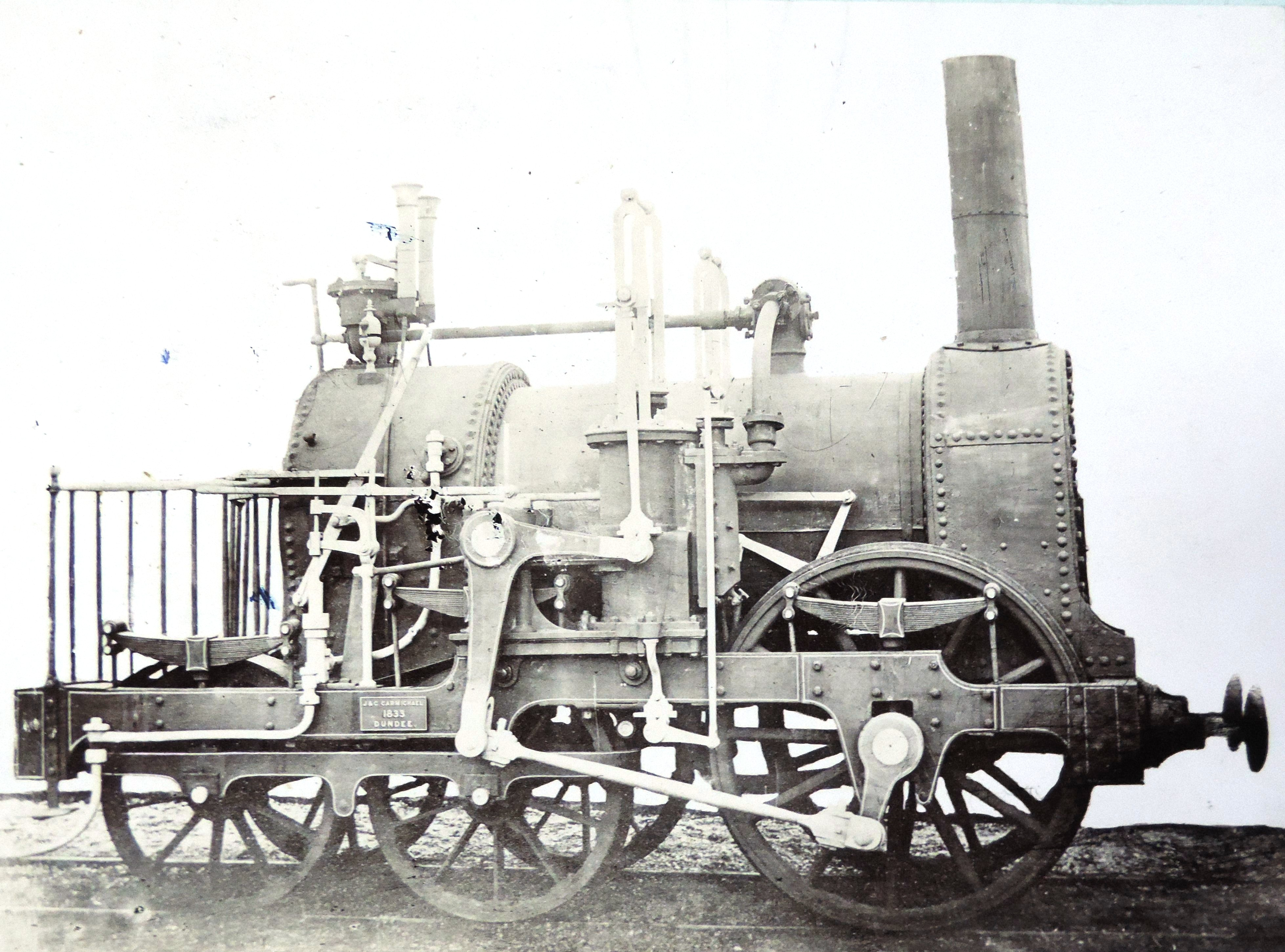
Dundee and Newtyle Railway 0-2-4

This is an unusual wheel arrangement, with the only known examples being three locomotives supplied to the 4 ft 6 in (1,372 mm) Dundee and Newtyle Railway by J and C Carmichael of Dundee in 1833. These were still in operation in 1847, but may have been scrapped in 1849 when the line was converted to standard gauge.

There was also the Bristol and Exeter Railway Fairfield steam carriage, built in 1848 for the Bristol and Exeter Railway, who used it on a branch line before turning it into an 0-2-2 by removing its coach section and two of its trailing wheels, after which it was promptly used for shunting duties.
