= J and C Carmichael =

Scottish engineering company

- Industry: Engineering
- Founded: 1810
- Founder: James Carmichael and Charles Carmichael
- Headquarters: Ward Foundry, Sessions Street, Dundee, Scotland
- Products: Steam locomotives and marine engineering

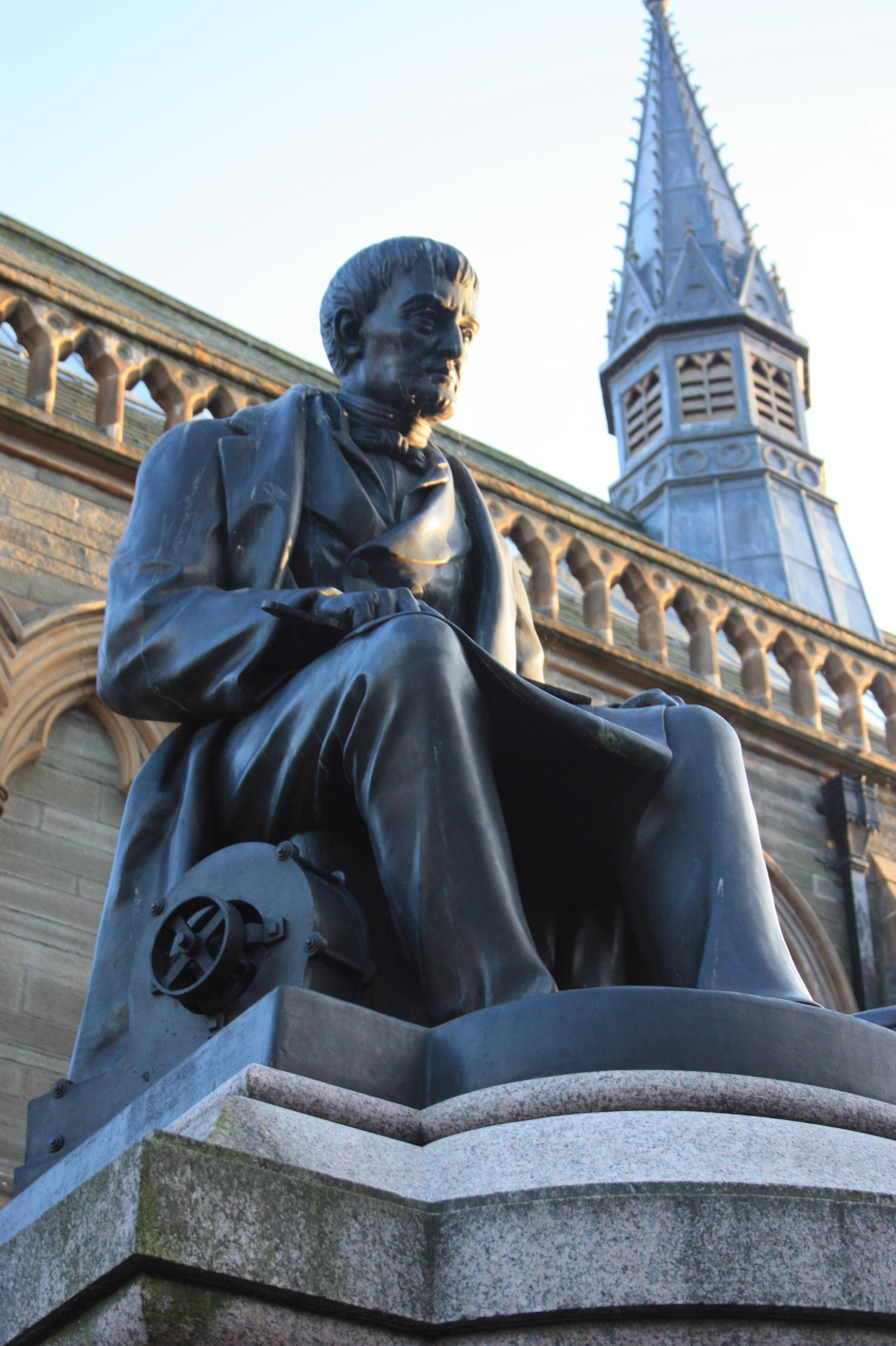
Statue of James Carmichael, Dundee

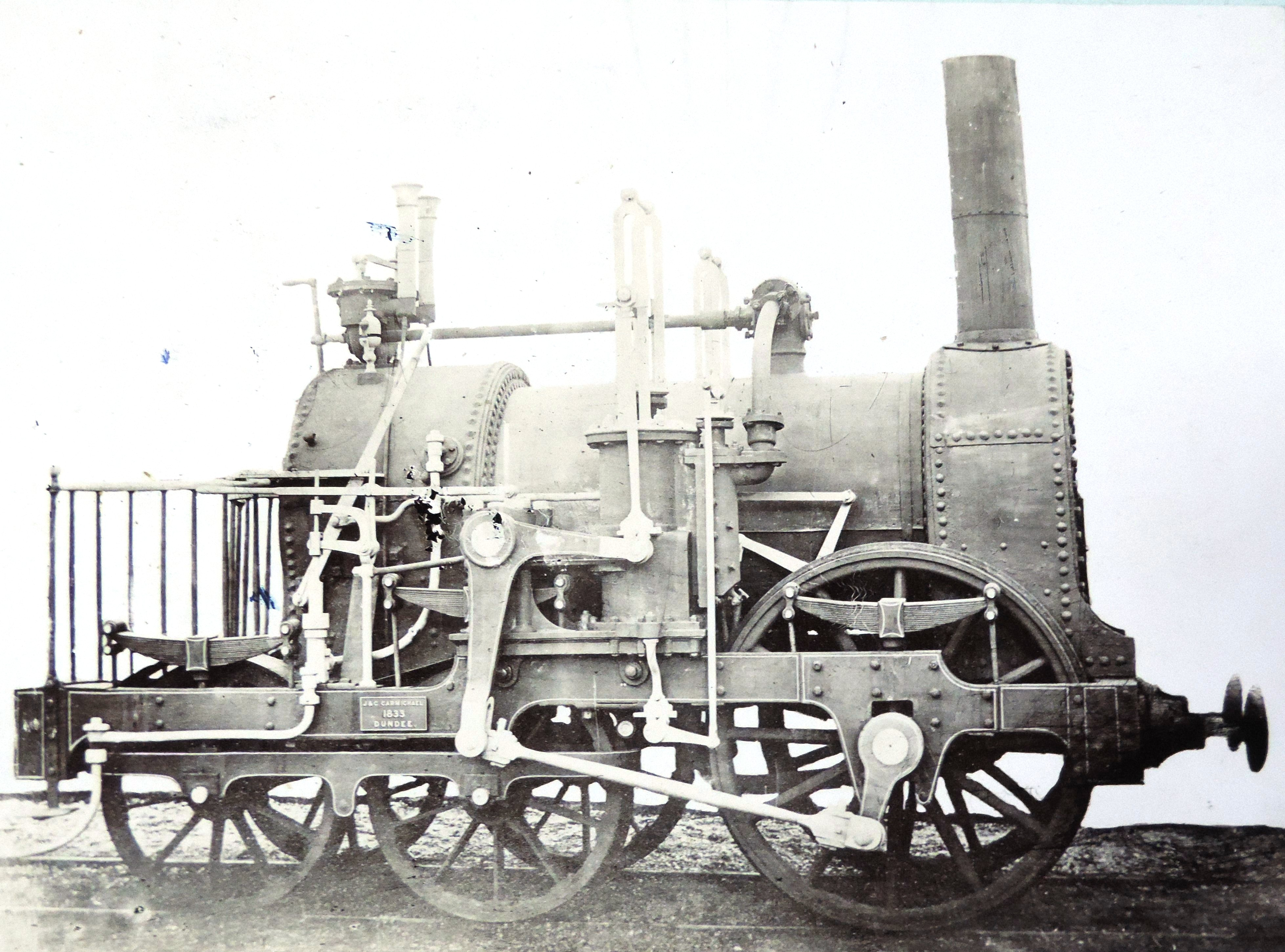
A Carmichael 0-2-4 locomotive, built 1833

J and C Carmichael was founded in 1810 at Ward Foundry, Session Street, Dundee, Scotland. The partners were James Carmichael (1776–1853) and his younger brother Charles Carmichael (1782–1843).

== History ==
The brothers were the sons of George Carmichael (d.1786), a Glasgow spirit dealer on the Saltmarket who later became a Glasgow baillie. On the father's death the mother moved to Pentland in Midlothian and apprenticed the boys to her brother, Mr Umpherston, as millwrights. James then went to work at the ASdelphi Spinning Works in Glasgow and Charles worked first in Loanhead then moved to Dundee, encouraging James to join him in 1810.

In 1821 they made their first steam engine. This powered the ferry from Dundee to Woodhaven.

James became a Burgess of Dundee in 1822.

Early work included weighbridges, turbines and marine engineering. In 1823, the company supplied an engine reversing gear, for the steamer George IV, which could be operated from the deck. Other products included fan blowers for forges and furnaces and machines for planing, shaping and boring.

In 1833, the company built two steam locomotives, Earl of Airlie and Lord Wharncliffe, for the Dundee and Newtyle Railway. These had the unusual wheel arrangement of 0-2-4 and used vertical cylinders, driving through bell cranks.

Production of steam vessels continued at their yard (at Seabraes, Dundee), and in February 1840 they launched the iron steam vessel, Queen, for the Fife and Mid-Lothian ferries. This was 114 foot length, and 20 foot beam, and was towed to Earl Gray's Dock to receive her 40 hp Carmichael engines. However in May 1841 the Seabraes shipbuilding yard was put up for sale or rent, including the Wright's shop, Smith's shop, furnaces and forges.

In the 1840s Charles lived at 1 Sommerville Place and James lived at 6 Fleuchar Craig.

Charles Carmichael died on 13 May 1843 and James Carmichael died on 14 August 1853. After this, the business was continued by their sons (James the son of Charles and David the son of James) and took the name James Carmichael and Company. It became a limited company in about 1894. The business closed in 1929.

== Recognition ==
A statue to James Carmichael by John Hutchison was erected in Albert Square in Dundee city centre in 1876. In the speeches on the inauguration day in 1876 the highlights of James's engineering skills mentioned included the development of new marine reversing gear in 1818, installed on the Tay steamer 'George IV' in 1821. In 1829 he developed fan blowers for ironworking forges at his Ward Foundry, also used later to ventilate coal mines. Both of these inventions were given freely to the trade, and the fan blowers were so well received by the engineers and ironfounders of Glasgow that the brothers were invited to a banquet in their honour where they were each presented with a service of silver plate. Other achievements were to be the first makers of railway locomotives in Scotland, and one of the first builders of iron ships in Scotland. While the inauguration speech stated that the iron steamer, Caledonia, was built and engined by Carmichael's in 1818, an erratum on page 4 of the same newspaper states that this was actually a wooden vessel. The first iron steamer on the Tay was likely the later Caledonia, built and engined by Carmichael's in 1838 (and to further confuse things, James Smart built a steamer called Caledonia in 1814, fitted with Robertson engines).
