= Hatton railway station (Tayside) =

Disused railway station in Carnoustie, Angus

Coordinates: 56.5566°N 3.1367°W

Hatton

General information
- Location: Carnoustie, Forfarshire; Scotland

Other information
- Status: Disused

History
- Original company: Dundee and Newtyle Railway
- Pre-grouping: Scottish Central Railway

Key dates
- 16 December 1831: Opened
- October 1865: Closed

Hatton railway station co-served the town of Carnoustie, in the historical county of Forfarshire, Scotland, from 1831 to 1865 on the Dundee and Newtyle Railway.

== History ==
The station was opened on 16 December 1831 by the Dundee and Newtyle Railway. The services were initially horse-drawn but steam locomotives were introduced on the line in 1833. The station closed in October 1865.

Preceding station	Disused railways	Following station
Newtyle (old); Line and station closed	Dundee and Newtyle Railway	Auchterhouse; Line and station closed
