= Newtyle railway station =

Disused railway station in Newtyle, Angus

Newtyle

General information
- Location: Newtyle, Angus; Scotland
- Coordinates: 56.559977°N 3.147638°W
- Grid reference: NO295414

Other information
- Status: Disused

History
- Original company: Dundee and Newtyle Railway
- Pre-grouping: Caledonian Railway
- Post-grouping: London, Midland and Scottish Railway

Key dates
- 31 August 1868: Opened
- 10 January 1955: Closed
Location

Newtyle railway station served the village of Newtyle, Angus, Scotland from 1866 to 1955 on the Dundee and Newtyle Railway.

== History ==
The station opened on 30 August 1866 by the Dundee and Newtyle Railway. It closed to both passengers and goods traffic on 10 January 1955.

Preceding station	Disused railways	Following station
Alyth Junction; Line and station closed	Dundee and Newtyle Railway	Hatton; Line and station closed
