= Coupar Angus railway station =

Disused railway station in Coupar Angus, Perth and Kinross

Coupar Angus

General information
- Location: Coupar Angus, Perth and Kinross; Scotland
- Coordinates: 56.5462°N 3.2623°W
- Grid reference: NO224401
- Platforms: 2

Other information
- Status: used

History
- Original company: Dundee and Newtyle Railway
- Pre-grouping: Scottish Midland Junction Railway; Caledonian Railway
- Post-grouping: London, Midland and Scottish Railway

Key dates
- 24 February 1837: Opened
- 6 September 1847: Closed
- 2 August 1848: Reopened
- 4 September 1967: Closed permanently
Location

Coupar Angus railway station served the town of Coupar Angus, Perth and Kinross, Scotland from 1837 to 1967 on the Scottish Midland Junction Railway.

== History ==
The station opened on 24 February 1837 by the Dundee and Newtyle Railway. It first closed on 6 September 1847 but reopened on 2 August 1848 by the Scottish Midland Junction Railway. It closed again to both passengers and goods traffic on 4 September 1967. The booking office and goods shed survive.

Preceding station	Disused railways	Following station
Ardler; Line and station closed	Scottish Midland Junction Railway	Woodside and Burrelton; Line and station closed
Terminus	Scottish Midland Junction Railway; Blairgowrie Branch	Stormont Loch Halt; Line and station closed
