= Alyth Junction railway station =

Railway station in Angus, Scotland

Alyth Junction
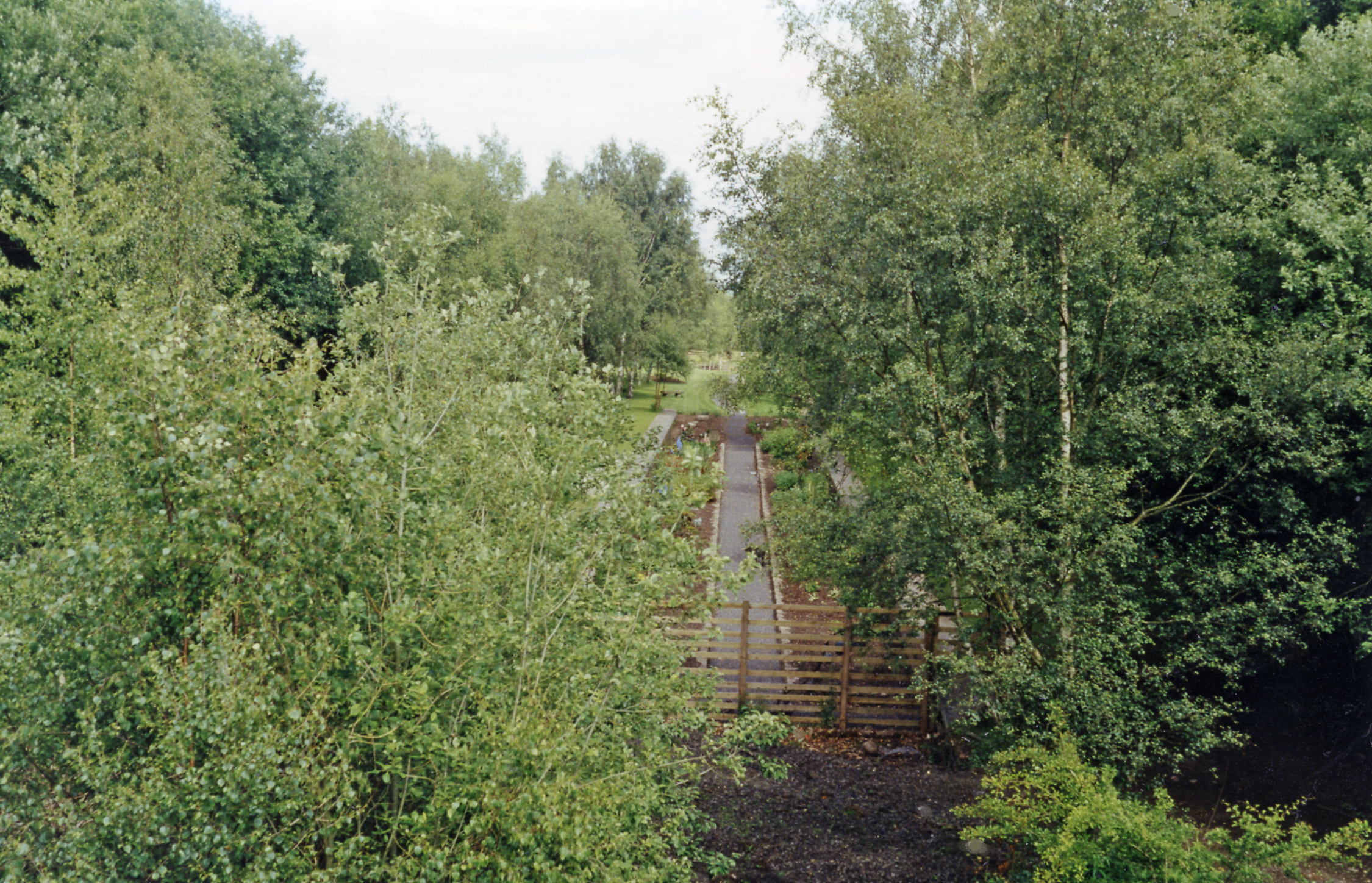
- Alyth Junction station site (1997)

General information
- Location: Meigle, Angus; Scotland
- Coordinates: 56.57347°N 3.15067°W

Other information
- Status: Disused

History
- Original company: Scottish North Eastern Railway
- Pre-grouping: Caledonian Railway
- Post-grouping: London, Midland and Scottish Railway

Key dates
- 1 August 1861: Station opened as Meigle
- 1 November 1876: Renamed as Alyth Junction
- 4 September 1967: Station closed
Location

Alyth Junction railway station served the village of Meigle in the Scottish county of Perth and Kinross. The station was the junction where the Alyth Railway and the Dundee and Newtyle Railway diverged from the Scottish Midland Junction Railway running between Perth and Arbroath.

The station is in the Angus council area, just over the border from Meigle.

== History ==
Opened by the Scottish North Eastern Railway, and absorbed into the Caledonian Railway, it became part of the London, Midland and Scottish Railway during the Grouping of 1923. Passing on to the Scottish Region of British Railways on nationalisation in 1948, it was then closed by the British Railways Board.

== The site today ==
Today some of the platforms remain and the site is waterlogged.

Preceding station	Historical railways	Following station
Meigle Junction	Caledonian Railway; Scottish Midland Junction Railway	Ardler
Terminus	Caledonian Railway; Dundee and Newtyle Railway	Newtyle
Terminus	Caledonian Railway; Alyth Railway	Meigle
