= Alyth Railway =

Railway line in Scotland

Overview
- Locale: Scotland
- Dates of operation: 11 August 1879–1 September 1884
- Successor: Caledonian Railway

Technical
- Track gauge: 4 ft 8 1/2 in (1,435 mm)

The Alyth Railway was a short branch railway line built in Strathmore in Scotland, connecting the town of Alyth to the main line network. It opened in 1861. Its junction was remote from any large population centre except Dundee, which was only reached by a primitive line with three rope worked inclines. This was modernised in 1868 and the Alyth branch, now with a good connection to Dundee, became busy. Nonetheless, the population of Alyth declined, and so did usage of the line, and it closed in 1951.

== History ==
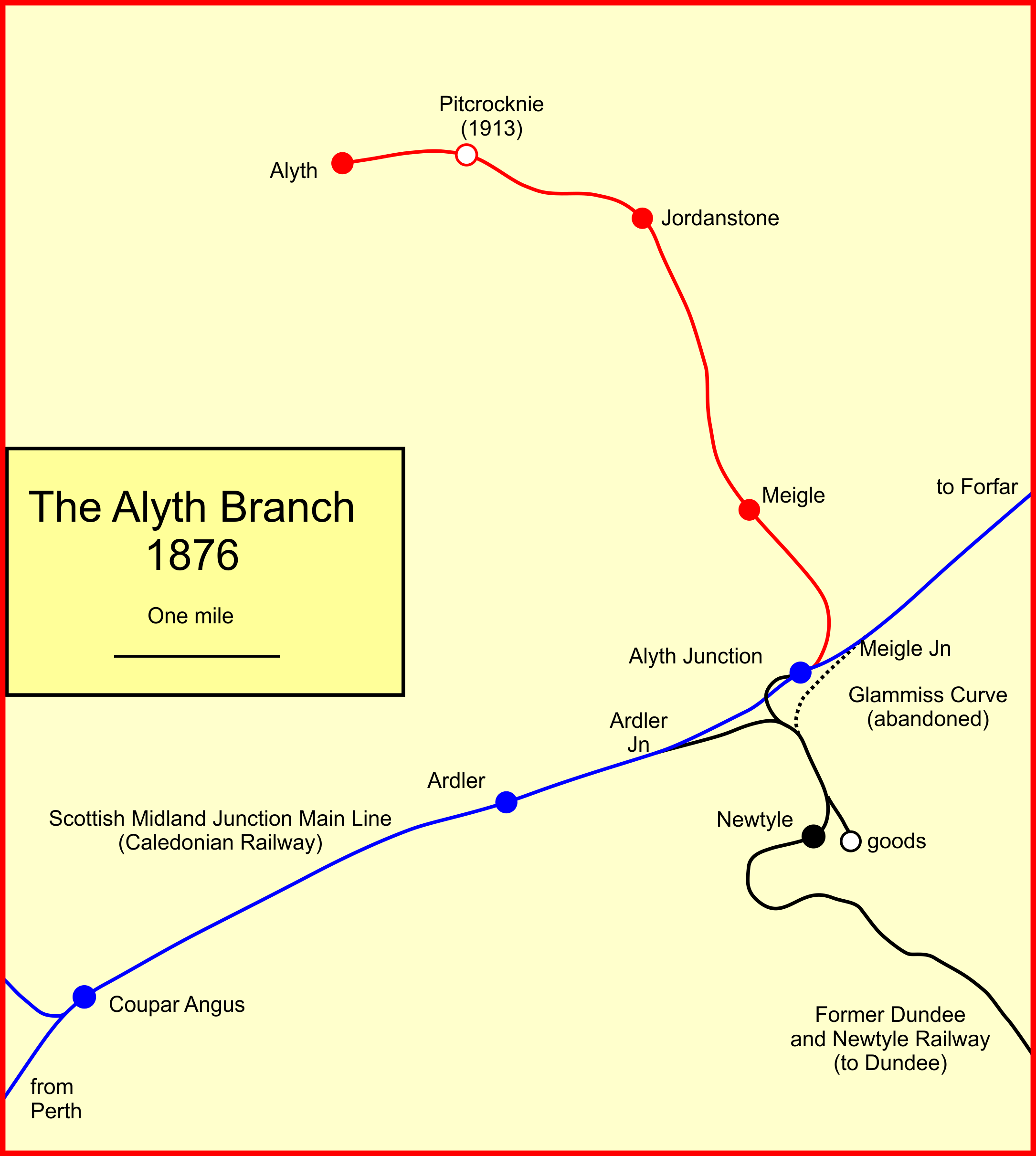
System map of the Alyth Railway

The Scottish Midland Junction Railway (SMJR) opened its main line between Perth and Forfar, forming part of a network of associated companies connecting central Scotland and Aberdeen. The line ran through Strathmore and adopted and upgraded two moribund railways, the Newtyle and Coupar Angus Railway and the Newtyle and Glammis Railway. The SMJR was amalgamated with the Aberdeen Railway in 1856, together forming the Scottish North Eastern Railway (SNER).

Alyth Railway Act 1858
- Act of Parliament
- Parliament of the United Kingdom
- Long title: An Act for making a Railway from the Meigle Station of the Scottish North-eastern Railway to the Town of Alyth, to be called "The Alyth Railway;" and for other Purposes in relation thereto.
- Citation: 21 & 22 Vict. c. xliii

Dates
- Royal assent: 14 June 1858

Promoters in Alyth saw the advantages of a railway connection, and they obtained an act of Parliament, the Alyth Railway Act 1858 (21 & 22 Vict. c. xliii), for a branch line to their town, on 14 June 1858; the Alyth Railway Company was authorised, with capital of £33,000. to build a branch line to Alyth from Meigle, a junction on the SNER main line. The branch was just over 5 miles (8 km) long.

It opened on 2 September 1861 (Note: According to Ross, Quick and Carter; Awdry, Stansfield and Butt say 12 August 1861.) and was worked by the SNER.

Alyth Railway Act 1864
- Act of Parliament
- Parliament of the United Kingdom
- Long title: An Act for vesting the Alyth Railway, by way of Lease, in the Scottish North-eastern Railway Company; to enable the Alyth Railway Company to raise additional Capital; and for other Purposes.
- Citation: 27 & 28 Vict. c. lxxxii

Dates
- Royal assent: 23 June 1864

Text of statute as originally enacted

The Alyth Railway Act 1864 (27 & 28 Vict. c. lxxxii) of 23 June 1864 authorised the lease of the line in perpetuity to the Scottish North Eastern Railway (SNER), which had taken over the Scottish Midland Junction Railway. The lease charge was 45% of gross receipts. The SNER was itself taken over by the Caledonian Railway in 1866 and the lease transferred to the Caledonian. The Alyth Railway Company was fully absorbed into the Caledonian Railway by the Caledonian Railway (Additional Powers) Act 1875 (38 & 39 Vict. c. cxlvii)

The population of Alyth had been 3,422 in 1861 but this declined to 2,837 by 1921 and did not recover. Use of the line declined accordingly, and it closed to passengers on 2 July 1951. Complete closure followed in January 1965.

== Topography ==
The point of junction with the main line was named Alyth Junction; the Dundee and Newtyle Railway had been connected to the former SMJR mainline by two ancillary railways, the Newtyle and Coupar Angus Railway and the Newtyle and Glammis Railway. (Glammis is spelt Glamis nowadays.) These two lines approaching from Dundee forked to run south-west and north-east respectively, and Alyth Junction was in the middle of the base of the triangle. As Dundee was a significant destination from Alyth, a connecting line from Newtyle was built by the Caledonian Railway, and it was made to cross over the main line to avoid conflict with main line trains. This opened on 3 August 1868.

The typical passenger timetable gave nine return trips daily, eleven on Saturdays, with most trains proceeding to Dundee.

The original Meigle station was located at the convergence of the Newtyle and Glammiss line with the main line, but the Newtyle spur line was lifted and the station was closed; a new Meigle Junction station was opened, sited at Alyth Junction.

The Dundee and Newtyle line had been laid with stone block sleeper track to a unique gauge of 4 ft 6.5in (1,384 mm) and had three rope-worked inclines. The Caledonian Railway took over the line and modernised it, eliminating the inclines; this work was completed on 31 August 1868. By now the Caledonian had taken over the SNER as well, and commenced running through passenger trains from Dundee to Alyth, which "became a busy country terminus over the next few years".

=== Passenger stations ===
- Alyth;
- Porterochnie; opened June 1912; soon renamed Pitcrocknie; mainly for golfers: there is a golf course adjacent; closed 1 January 1917; reopened September 1919 as Pitcrocknie Platform; in 1938 shown as Pitcrocknie Halt, and then Pitcrocknie Siding from 28 October 1940; in 1922 and 1938 Bradshaw has most trains on the branch marked "Stops when required to set down Golfers or take up when there are passengers on the platform." The stop was removed from the public timetable following nationalisation in 1948 but it was not officially closed and still picked up passengers until the line closed;
- Jordanstone;
- Fullarton; renamed Meigle 1 November 1876;
- Meigle (sometimes known as Meigle Junction); junction on SNER main line; renamed Alyth Junction on 1 November 1876.
