= Dundee and Newtyle Railway =

Railway in the north of Scotland

Overview
- Locale: Scotland
- Dates of operation: 26 May 1826–28 July 1863
- Successor: Scottish Central Railway

Technical
- Track gauge: 4 ft 6 1/2 in (1,384 mm)
- Length: 11 miles (18 km)

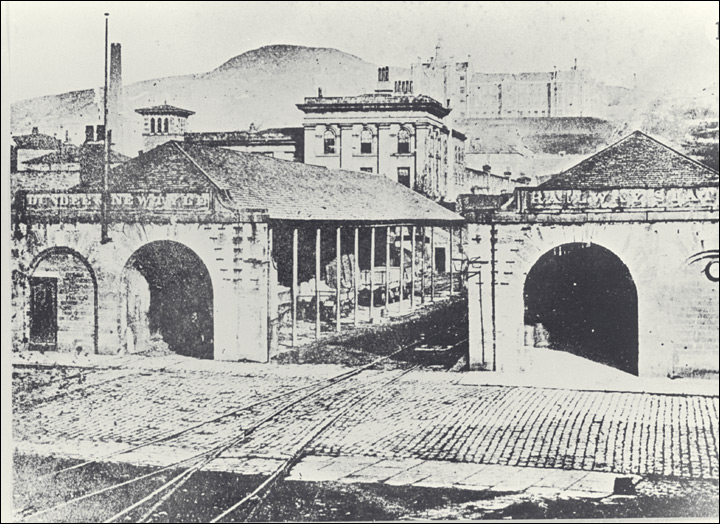
The original Dundee station on Ward road

The Dundee and Newtyle Railway opened in 1831 and was the first railway in the north of Scotland. It was built to carry goods between Dundee and the fertile area known as Strathmore; this involved crossing the Sidlaw Hills, and was accomplished with three rope-worked inclined planes. Newtyle was a remote railhead, and the anticipated traffic volumes were not achieved, the inclines incurred heavy operating costs, and the railway never made money.

Responding to the criticism of the remote Newtyle station, two further railways were built; these were nominally independent but for practical purposes were branches of the Dundee line. The lines were the Newtyle and Coupar Angus Railway and the Newtyle and Glammiss Railway; they opened in 1837-1838. The extension lines did not transform the finances of the main railway, but when the Scottish Midland Junction Railway wanted to build a main line between Perth and Forfar, it adopted the lines and upgraded them, incorporating them into the route of the new main line.

The Dundee and Newtyle Railway was taken over by the Dundee and Perth Railway and the difficult inclines were by-passed by circuitous and more easily graded routes in the period from 1860 to 1868. Nonetheless the line declined and closed to passengers in 1955. The Coupar Angus and Glammis (Glamis) lines continued as part of the Forfar main line, but that closed in 1967.

== History ==
=== Conception ===
In the first decades of the nineteenth century Dundee had been established as an important manufacturing town and port. The topography of the area presented a challenge in gaining access to the agricultural hinterland. Strathmore forms a broad and fertile plain running from northeast to southwest, following the Dean Water and River Isla flowing to the River Tay. Hilly land is located immediately behind Dundee, and a steep and unproductive range of hills, the Sidlaws, presents a second barrier separating Dundee from Strathmore. The need for connection came from both ends: Dundee needed access to Strathmore for processing its jute and hemp products: flax was imported from the Baltic states on a scale unmatched anywhere in Scotland, and the agriculture of Strathmore needed access to a sea port. The sea port might not necessarily be Dundee, and that fact motivated the Burgh Council of Dundee to consider a transport link.

A canal had been proposed in 1817, but a more realistic idea was formed in 1825 when Dundee Burgh Council decided to fund a survey for a railway. Charles Landale was commissioned to undertake the survey. (He was later described as "an apothecary" by General Pasley.) Landale proposed a route that passed through a gap in the hills formed by the Glack of Newtyle; the summit of the route was to be at 532 feet (162 m) above sea level. Railway locomotives were primitive and inefficient at this early date and Landale's route involved rope-worked inclined planes: one (the Law Incline) climbing immediately from the Dundee terminal, a level section, a second climb (the Balbeuchly incline), another level section, and a third incline (the Hatton incline) descending to Newtyle. There was no community at Newtyle at that time; the location was just a railhead. The Dundee terminal was not close to the harbour, or even the waterfront, at Dundee.

Dundee and Newtyle Railway Act 1826
- Act of Parliament
- Parliament of the United Kingdom
- Long title: An Act for making a Railway from the Royal Burgh and Port of Dundee in the County of Forfar, to Newtyle in the said County.
- Citation: 7 Geo. 4. c. ci

Dates
- Royal assent: 26 May 1826

Text of statute as originally enacted

A parliamentary bill was submitted for the line and it was enacted as the Dundee and Newtyle Railway Act 1826 (7 Geo. 4. c. ci) on 26 May 1826; it was the first railway in the north of Scotland.

=== Construction ===
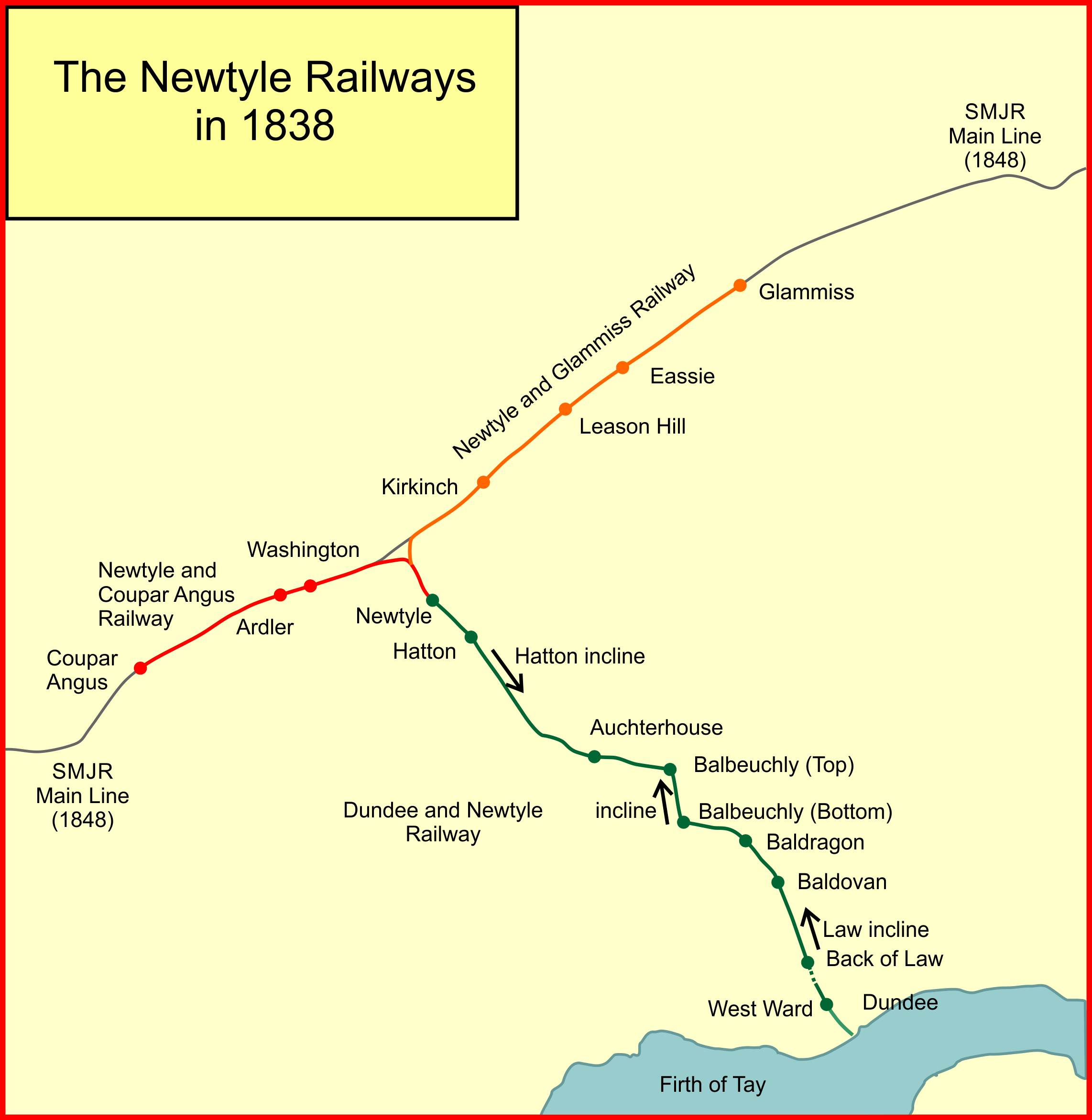
System map of the Newtyle lines 1838

The line was built with fish-bellied rails on stone blocks, with the rare track gauge of 4 ft 6 1/2 in (1,384 mm); the rails were rather light at 28 lb/ft (41.67 kg/m). 600 shares were issued at £50 each, that is £30,000, with authorised borrowings of £10,000. (Note: From Lythe, page 548, and also Marshall, page 12, and Carter page 32, and Robertson, page 66. Groome says £140,000, apparently adding the additional capital authorised by later acts of Parliament. Awdry is silent on the matter.) These were quickly taken up. The estimated cost of the line was to be £25,600 including £3,700 for the supply of the three stationary steam engines for the inclines, but excluding the cost of land acquisition.

Dundee and Newtyle Railway Act 1830
- Act of Parliament
- Parliament of the United Kingdom
- Long title: An Act to amend an Act for making a Railway from Dundee to Newtyle.
- Citation: 11 Geo. 4 & 1 Will. 4. c. lx

Dates
- Royal assent: 29 May 1830

Text of statute as originally enacted

The tunnel in Dundee under the eastern flank of The Law seems to have been added as an afterthought, and difficult tunnelling conditions proved expensive; moreover land acquisition was considerably more expensive than had been allowed for. The Law Tunnel was completed on 21 January 1829, but later in the year the works generally were reported as at a standstill. Landale was dismissed from the service of the company, amid criticisms that he failed to control the contractors properly, and that the estimates had been considerably overspent. The company had exhausted all its capital, and amid considerable acrimony, it decided to seek authorisation for additional capital and for borrowing powers, and these were granted by the Dundee and Newtyle Railway Act 1830 (11 Geo. 4 & 1 Will. 4. c. lx) of 29 May 1830: £10,000 in additional shares and £20,000 in borrowing. The act also conferred powers to extend the line in Dundee to the waterfront, "through the streets", and "the additional funds enabled completion of the line".

The Dundee terminal was at Ward Road on the north side of the town, and immediately ascended Law Hill by a 1 in 10 incline, 1,060 yards (970 m) long; at the top it entered Law Tunnel, about 330 yards (300 m) long; the tunnel was ten feet (3.05 m) wide and 10 ft 2 in (3.10 m) high. There was a level section of 4.75 miles (7.64 km) long, after which the Balbeuchly incline rose at 1 in 25 for 1,700 yards (1,600 m). A further level section followed, also of 4.75 miles (7.64 km) to Hatton. The final incline descended to Newtyle at 1 in 13 for 1,000 yards (910 m).

The inclines were all straight; the Law incline was laid with three rails at the top, four in the central section and two at the lower end; a 40 hp (30 kW) high pressure engine was provided. The Balbeuchly incline had only a single track and was worked by a 20 hp (15 kW) condensing engine; the Hatton incline also had a single track and had a similar engine.

A newspaper advertisement stated that the line had been opened for traffic on 16 December 1831, but this was only on the upper levels, not including the Law and Hatton inclines; the extension to the full extent of the line was reported to have taken place on 3 April 1832. 2,645 passengers were carried during April 1832.

=== The line in operation ===
The original estimates for the line had assumed a dominant goods traffic, approximately balanced from Dundee and to Dundee. Passenger traffic became remarkably buoyant, notwithstanding the lack of attraction at Newtyle. The company introduced a variety of season tickets, and workmen's fares conveying sheep shearers at cheap rates as well as excursionists. The original passenger coaches were said to be old stage coach bodies set on trucks. "Outside" passengers travelled on the roof of the coaches. Marshall states that two old "Tally-Ho" coaches that had been operating on the Perth turnpike were fixed to a wagon chassis.

Whishaw described the carriages differently: there were first class carriages and mixed carriages; the latter "resemble an ordinary stage coach, with the addition of an entirely open compartment both before and behind; the middle compartment, which holds only four passengers, is called the extra first class; and each of the open compartments holds eight passengers; altogether twenty." There were about 100 wagons.

There was a sophisticated system of signalling on the inclines: a white board with a black centre was fixed at the foot of the Law Incline, and was turned to face the engine house (at the head of the incline) five minutes before departure time. The engine operator had to wait for the board to be turned before commencing the ascent. A bell was rung in fog, and red and white lights were used at night.

The stations were very crude, and in these early days were more comparable with the places at which stage coaches might pick up and set down; they were at:

- Ward station, Dundee;
- Off-set at back of Law, later known as the Cross Roads;
- Off-set at Flour Mill, St Mary's Road, later known as Baldovan;
- Off-set at Baldragon;
- Foot of Balbeuchly incline;
- Top of Balbeuchly incline;
- Off-set at Auchterhouse;
- Newtyle depot.

The train service consisted of mixed trains leaving both Dundee and Newtyle at 8.00 a.m., 10.00 a.m. and 4.00 p.m. with an additional goods service at 1.00 p.m.

The company was evidently unhappy about the state of the engineering of its line, and in 1832 it commissioned the engineer Nicholas Wood to review it. He generally approved the situation, only commenting that horse traction should be continued "until the traffic should be more developed", and that he "looked forward to the early extension of the line at both ends, particularly at Dundee." This referred to the 1830 authorisation to extend to the harbour in Dundee; this was not carried out until 1836. He recommended contracting out the management of the operation of the line, clearly a criticism of the current management.

=== Traction ===
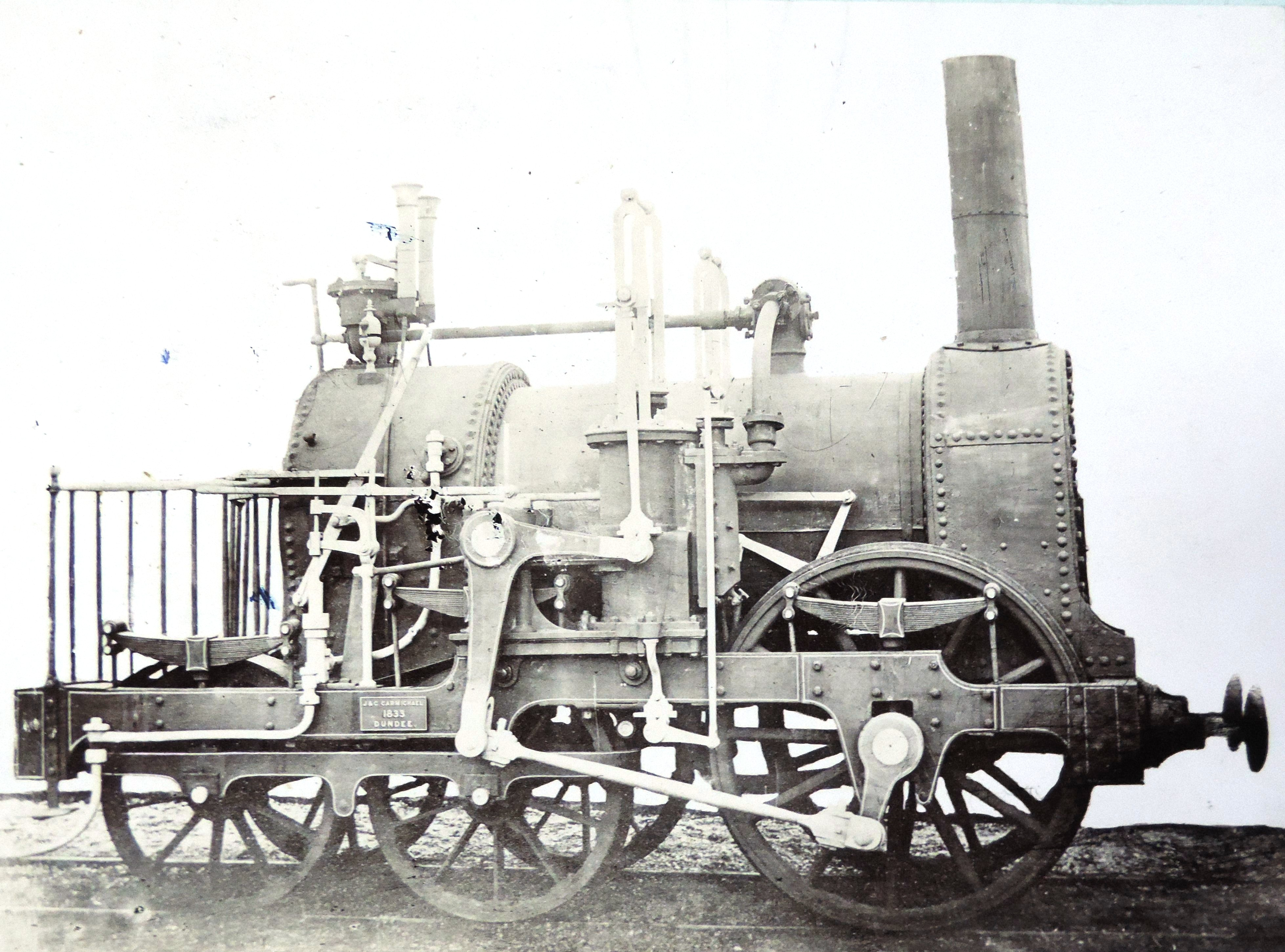
1833 Carmichael Engine

Horse traction was used on the level sections between the inclined planes. From September 1833 steam locomotives were introduced: no. 1, Earl of Airlie and no. 2, Lord Wharncliffe were delivered (on 20 and 25 September respectively) from J and C Carmichael of Dundee. They had the 0-2-4 wheel arrangement. They had single-acting vertical cylinders driving the front wheels through bell cranks; the trailing wheels were mounted in a bogie, a very early implementation of that construction. A third locomotive, no. 3, nicknamed Trotter was delivered from James Stirling and Co on 3 March 1834; it was similar to the earlier engines, but a little smaller. A fourth engine, an 0-4-0 of the Planet type named John Bull, was acquired from Robert Stephenson & Co in April 1836. The four locomotives cost about £3,300.

The Earl of Airlie entered service on 29 September 1833 on the level section below Balbeuchly incline.

When Alexander Allan (superintendent of the Scottish Central Railway) discovered one of the original locos in use as a stationary engine in 1854, he realised it was of historical importance, and had it 'removed and all the parts carefully put together, cleaned, painted, and lined'. He then had it photographed, and a lithograph taken from the photograph was reproduced in an article in The Engineer journal of 1883. The date on the maker's plate of 1833 identifies it as either no. 1, Earl of Airlie or no. 2, Lord Wharncliffe.

The introduction of locomotives, and therefore somewhat faster speeds, now showed up the deficiencies in the engineering of the line. Passenger trains averaged 15 mph (24 km/h).

=== Development of Newtyle ===
Early in 1832 Lord Wharncliffe, as the landlord of the small settlement at Newtyle. offered a prize for the best plan for development of a village there; George Matthewson of Dundee won the prize and his scheme was implemented between 1832 and 1838, somewhat enlarging the community and providing roads and drainage, and water supplies; however the expansion did not materially affect the income of the railway.

=== Reaching the harbour ===
The original line had its Dundee terminus at Ward, half a mile (800m) from the harbour, the origin of much of its goods traffic. In 1834 definite plans were prepared for an extension to the harbour; this had been authorised in principle by the original Dundee and Newtyle Railway Act 1826. The burgh was enhancing its dock facilities at the time and wished to encourage railway access, and therefore agreed to the extension through the streets: the line was to run down Lindsay Street, across Nethergate to Yeaman Shore, then turning east to join the Dundee Harbour internal railway lines. There were to be inclines of up to 1 in 24 and horse traction was to move two wagons at a time. The extension was completed in February 1837. The Yeaman Shore section was moved from street running to railway property in 1847.

=== Financial difficulties ===
The construction of the line had not been well executed, and maintenance costs were considerable; in addition the three stationary engines were expensive to operate. The shortage of capital at the time of building the line had resulted in heavy loans being taken. The agricultural traffic from Strathmore had not developed as much as had been forecast, so that the lower income and the weekly burden of the outgoings was a serious problem. Operating expenses were high, at 83% of gross revenue; every train required five engines: the three stationary engines and two on the level sections. The outgoings left inadequate funds to service the loan debt.

Dundee and Newtyle Railway Act 1836
- Act of Parliament
- Parliament of the United Kingdom
- Long title: An Act to amend the Acts for making a Railway from Dundee to Newtyle in the County of Forfar.
- Citation: 6 & 7 Will. 4. c. cii

Dates
- Royal assent: 4 July 1836

Text of statute as originally enacted

The company obtained a further act of Parliament, the Dundee and Newtyle Railway Act 1836 (6 & 7 Will. 4. c. cii), in July 1836 to issue a further 2,000 shares of £50, which would generate £100,000 of new capital. In the event investors were unwilling to buy shares in a loss-making concern, and the shares could only be allocated at a 40% discount and many shares were allocated to creditors.

=== New railways from Newtyle ===
The Dundee and Newtyle line connected Dundee with Strathmore, but ended there in a deserted location; it covered the difficult terrain crossing the Sidlaw Hills but failed to reach any settlement. Within Strathmore, railway construction would be easy, and in 1835 two small companies were authorised to build outwards from Newtyle. The Newtyle and Coupar Angus Railway was authorised on 21 July 1835 and the Newtyle and Glammiss Railway was authorised on 30 July 1835. (Glammiss is nowadays spelt Glamis.)

The railways were to build a line jointly from the Dundee and Newtyle station at Newtyle northwards and then diverge; the Coupar Angus line then ran west-south-west to that town, opening in February 1837. The Glammiss line would run east-north-east; it opened for goods traffic in 1837, and for passengers on 4 June 1838. The line from Newtyle station to the point of divergence descended at 1 in 100, but it was worked by horse traction, occasionally supplemented by locomotives. The two lines had the same gauge as the Dundee line and were worked in effect as branches of it. Marshall observes that "Neither line was ... successful in bringing in new business."

The Dundee Weekly News of 5 November 1898 carried a report from William M'Intosh who stated that from 1837 to about 1841, during windy weather, a tarpaulin was lashed to the end of the passenger carriage, propelling it by wind power at from 10 to 20 mph (16 to 32 km/h). (Note: The newspaper carried an artist's impression of the event. M'Intosh also asserted locomotive operation in 1841, which is not supported by Board of Trade returns. M'Intosh's recollection (and therefore also the artist's image) was 60 years after the event, and is not corroborated by any other record. Many later writers have referred to the article at face value, but it may be appropriate to treat it with caution.)

=== More financial problems ===
In 1841 the Dundee and Newtyle had taken a lease of the Coupar Angus line, but they found that they were quite unable to pay the lease charge.

Towards the end of 1844 the company was exploring means of leasing the line, but this was unsuccessful too. Finally in 1846 the Dundee and Perth Railway agreed to lease the line, probably in order to keep the Scottish Midland Junction Railway out. This was authorised by the Dundee and Perth Railway (Amendment) Act 1846 (9 & 10 Vict. c. ccxxviii) of 27 July 1846: the line was leased to the Dundee and Perth for 999 years for £1,400 per annum. (Note: The Dundee and Newtyle Railway Company continued in existence until the grouping of the railways in 1923 under the Railways Act 1921, but it was a financial shell only, receiving the lease charge.)

=== Under the Dundee and Perth ===
Dundee and Newtyle Railway (Widening, Altering and Improving) Act 1847
- Act of Parliament
- Parliament of the United Kingdom
- Long title: An Act for widening, altering, and improving the Dundee and Newtyle Railway.
- Citation: 10 & 11 Vict. c. cvi

Dates
- Royal assent: 2 July 1847

Text of statute as originally enacted

The lease was effective from October 1846. The D&PR took some time to assess its new property, but in 1847 it obtained the Dundee and Newtyle Railway (Widening, Altering and Improving) Act 1847 (10 & 11 Vict. c. cvi) on 2 July 1847. This permitted the opening out of the Law Tunnel and the construction of a deviation by-passing Balbeuchly incline. These works were not carried out at this stage, although in 1849 work was undertaken to convert the gauge to standard gauge. The line closed during October 1849 for the work to be carried out. The opportunity was taken to ease the worst sharp curves. The locomotives Earl of Airlie, Lord Wharnclife and Trotter were converted, but John Bull was sold to contractors.

=== The Scottish Midland Junction Railway ===
The Scottish Midland Junction Railway was authorised in 1845 to construct a main line railway from Perth to Forfar, joining Arbroath and Forfar Railway giving ultimate access to Aberdeen. Its intended route through Strathmore meant that the unremunerative Newtyle and Coupar Angus Railway and the Newtyle and Glammiss Railway routes lay directly along a suitable alignment. The SMJR acquired those two small railways, and closed them for upgrading to main line standards, and providing double track. The Eassie to Glamis section closed in July 1846, with the remainder of that line closing in October 1847; the Coupar Angus line closed in November 1847. The SMJR opened from Perth to Forfar on 2 August 1848; a short connecting line was provided at Meigle to join the two routes.

=== By-passing the inclines ===
Dundee and Newtyle Railway Improvement Act 1859
- Act of Parliament
- Parliament of the United Kingdom
- Long title: An Act for enabling the Dundee and Perth and Aberdeen Railway Junction Company to improve the Dundee and Newtyle Railway; and for other Purposes.
- Citation: 22 & 23 Vict. c. xviii

Dates
- Royal assent: 21 July 1859

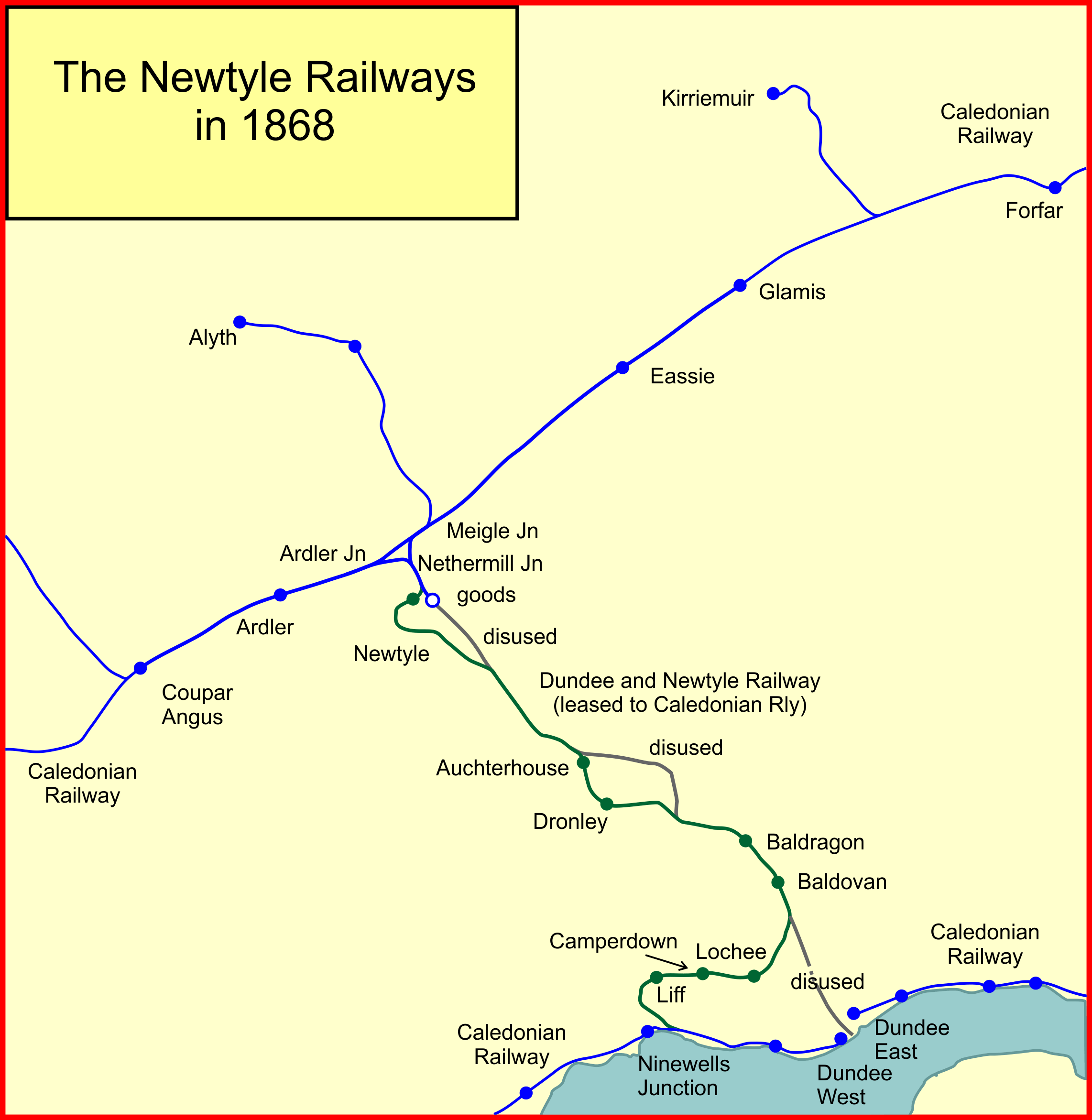
The Newtyle lines in 1868

Returning to the Dundee and Newtyle line, the Dundee and Newtyle Railway Improvement Act 1859 (22 & 23 Vict. c. xviii) was obtained on 21 July 1859 to build by-pass lines. The Balbeuchly incline was avoided by the construction of a line from Rosemill to Auchterhouse; it had a new station at Dronley and Auchterhouse station was relocated. It opened on 1 November 1860. The Lochee deviation ran from Ninewells Junction to Fairmuir Junction, opening on 10 June 1861. This long westward sweep avoided the Law tunnel and incline, and gave better access to the harbour through the Dundee and Perth station in Union Street. Crossroads and Ward stations were closed, and new stations were opened on the deviation at Lochee, Lochee West and Liff.

For the time being the Newtyle incline continued in use, until the Scottish Central Railway took over the Dundee and Perth line in 1863. The new owner obtained powers in 1864 to build a new line past Hatton to a new Newtyle station. The Caledonian Railway absorbed the SCR in 1865, and the work was not completed until 31 August 1868. The original Newtyle station was retained as a goods depot.

=== Fairmuir and Maryfield ===
Towards the final decades of the nineteenth century, Dundee had expanded northwards and there was a demand for goods facilities in that part of the Burgh. In 1885 a short branch was opened to a goods station at Fairmuir, located in the angle between Clepington Road and Strathmartine Road. It left the main line at Fairmuir Junction, a little to the west of the original incline route, and crossed that route. Fairmuir Junction was aligned to permit through running from Dundee to Fairmuir.

In 1890 the branch was extended eastwards to Maryfield, a further goods station located at Mains Loan and Clepington Road.

=== The twentieth century ===
The three Newtyle lines had been conceived to carry materials and passengers between Dundee and Strathmore. The Coupar Angus and Glamis lines were now part of the through main line between Perth and Aberdeen, and the importance of traffic to and from Dundee was much reduced: Newtyle and the other locations on the line were simply small rural settlements. (Newtyle had a population of 1,139 in 1861, 883 in 1921 and 766 in 1981.) In the early years of the twentieth century, Dundee was growing in importance, and in size, and travelling to work by train was rising in significance. However, the Newtyle line made wide sweeps to reduce the gradients and the trains were slow and infrequent. When street-running passenger tramways were introduced they abstracted considerable traffic from the line, and decline set in. The Caledonian Railway, as owner of the line, was a constituent of the new London Midland and Scottish Railway under the Railways Act 1921, and the remote and eccentric backwater line was even less significant.

Nationalisation followed in 1948, and road motor transport became more efficient and cheaper, and the railway declined further. Passenger trains between Dundee and Newtyle ceased on 1 October 1955. The Newtyle to Auchterhouse section was closed to goods traffic on 5 May 1958, and the entire line closed on 6 November 1967.

The Strathmore main line remained in use as an express route between Perth and Aberdeen; the closure of wayside stations simplified express train running. The streamlined A4 class Pacifics were displaced from East Coast Main Line passenger express services by diesel locomotives, and found a final duty for some years in the 1960s running three-hour expresses from Glasgow to Aberdeen over the route. This started on 18 June 1962 and continued until the last run on 14 September 1966. The rationalisation imposed following the Beeching report resulted in only one route between central Scotland and Aberdeen being retained: the route through Dundee and Arbroath. The Strathmore route, between Stanley (north of Perth) and Kinnaber Junction (north of Montrose) closed on 3 April 1967 for through freight and 3 September 1967 for passenger traffic. Stub goods services continued to Brechin and Forfar for some years.

== Topography ==
The original Dundee and Newtyle Railway line opened on 16 December 1831 on the upper levels, and throughout on 3 April 1832. At this early date formal stations were not established and passenger stopping places were made where convenient; they were referred to as offsets, that is, setting down places, in many instances. The names used changed from time to time. Balbeuchly was spelt Balbeuchley locally at certain times.

Dundee and Newtyle first main line:

- Newtyle; opened 3 April 1832; closed 31 August 1868;
- Hatton; opened 16 December 1831; closed October 1965;
- Hatton incline;
- Auchterhouse; opened 16 December 1831; closed 1 November 1860;
- Balbeuchly (Top); opened 16 December 1831; closed 1 November 1860;
- Balbeuchly Incline;
- Balbeuchly (Foot); closed July 1855;
- Baldragon; opened 16 December 1831; closed 1 January 1917; reopened 1 February 1919; closed 10 January 1955;
- Flour Depot St Mary's Road Offset; opened 16 December 1831; soon renamed Baldovan; renamed Baldovan and Downfield 1905; closed 10 January 1955;
- Back of Law; occasionally also referred to as Top of Law, and Cross Roads; opened 16 December 1831; closed July 1855;
- West Ward; variously known as Dundee Ward, and Ward Street; opened 3 April 1832; closed 10 June 1861;
- Dundee Harbour; goods only.

Dundee and Newtyle (Caledonian Railway) after opening of the deviations:

- Newtyle; new station opened 31 August 1868; closed 10 January 1955;
- Auchterhouse; opened 1 November 1860;
- Dronley; opened 1 November 1860; closed 10 January 1955;
- Baldragon; see above;
- Baldovan; see Flour Depot above;
- Fairmuir Junction;
- Lochee; opened 10 June 1861; closed 10 January 1955;
- Victoria; opened 10 June 1861; renamed Camperdown 1862; renamed Lochee West 1896; closed 1 January 1917;
- Liff; opened 10 January 1861; closed 10 January 1955;
- Ninewells Junction; converging with line from Perth to Dundee.

Newtyle and Coupar Angus Railway:

- Coupar Angus; opened 24 February 1837; closed 6 September 1847; reopened 2 August 1848; closed 4 September 1967
- Ardler; opened 24 February 1837; closed 6 September 1847; reopened 2 August 1848; closed 11 June 1956;
- Washington; opened 24 February 1837; closed 6 September 1847;
- Ardler Junction;
- Nethermill Junction;
- Newtyle; Dundee and Newtyle station; see above.

Newtyle and Glammiss Railway:

- Newtyle; Dundee and Newtyle Railway; see above;
- Nethermill Junction;
- Meigle Junction;
- Meigle; opened 1861; renamed Alyth Junction 1876; closed 4 September 1967;
- Kirkinch; opened 4 June 1838; closed 1847;
- Leason Hill; opened 4 June 1838; closed 1847;
- Eassie; opened 4 June 1838; closed October 1847; reopened 2 August 1848; closed 11 June 1956;
- Glammiss; opened 4 June 1838; name changed to Glamis at uncertain date; closed July 1846; reopened 2 August 1848; closed 11 June 1956.

== Archives ==
The archives of the Dundee and Newtyle Railway Company including its minute books are held by Archive Services at the University of Dundee. The same institution also holds the research papers of Professor Stanley Jones relating to the railway and papers gathered on the railway's history by the late Tom Craigie.

== Notes ==
=== Sources ===
- Awdry, Christopher (1990). Encyclopaedia of British Railway Companies. Sparkford: Patrick Stephens Ltd. ISBN 1-8526-0049-7. OCLC 19514063. CN 8983.
- Butt, R. V. J. (October 1995). The Directory of Railway Stations: details every public and private passenger station, halt, platform and stopping place, past and present (1st ed.). Sparkford: Patrick Stephens Ltd. ISBN 978-1-85260-508-7. OCLC 60251199. OL 11956311M.
- Jowett, Alan (March 1989). Jowett's Railway Atlas of Great Britain and Ireland: From Pre-Grouping to the Present Day (1st ed.). Sparkford: Patrick Stephens Ltd. ISBN 978-1-85260-086-0. OCLC 22311137.
- Ferguson, Dr N (October 1995) [1995]. Dundee and Newtyle Railway Including the Alyth and Blairgowrie Branches (Oakwood Library of Railway History) (Hardcover). The Oakwood Press. ISBN 0-85361-476-8.
