= Scottish Midland Junction Railway =

Former railway line in Scotland

Overview
- Locale: Scotland
- Dates of operation: 31 July 1845–29 July 1856
- Successor: Scottish North Eastern Railway

Technical
- Track gauge: 4 ft 8 1/2 in (1,435 mm) standard gauge

The Scottish Midland Junction Railway was authorised in 1845 to build a line from Perth to Forfar. Other companies obtained authorisation in the same year, and together they formed a route from central Scotland to Aberdeen. The SMJR opened its main line on 4 August 1848. Proposals to merge with other railways were rejected by Parliament at first, but in 1856 the SMJR merged with the Aberdeen Railway to form the Scottish North Eastern Railway. The SNER was itself absorbed into the larger Caledonian Railway in 1866. The original SMJR main line was now a small section of a main line from Carlisle and central Scotland to Aberdeen.

The original route was well aligned for fast running, but it by-passed numerous towns and many branches were built to serve them. The rival North British Railway had its own route from the south to Aberdeen, and spectacular competition for the fastest journey from London to Aberdeen was generated in the final decades of the nineteenth century. In the 1960s there were some reflections of those days when powerful steam engines, displaced by diesel locomotives from other routes, operated a fast Glasgow - Aberdeen passenger service for some years.

In the mid-1960s the move to rationalise duplicate routes led to closure of the SMJR main line in 1967 except for a residual goods service to intermediate locations. Now the entire SMJR network has closed, except for the section from Perth to Stanley Junction, serving the main line to Inverness.

== History ==
=== The Caledonian Railway ===
From the 1810s, a number of short railway lines had been operating in Scotland; in most cases these were connected with mineral extraction, and there was little thought to connecting between them to form a network. The Stockton and Darlington Railway and the Liverpool and Manchester Railway in England showed that longer railway routes could be worthwhile, and thoughts turned to trunk railways in Scotland, and to connection to the emerging English network.

In the 1840s business people in Scotland made definite moves which resulted in proposals for trunk lines to connect the central belt of Scotland with England, and in 1845 there was a frenzy of parliamentary bills for Scottish railways. The Caledonian Railway was authorised on 12 April 1845 with capital of £1,500,000. Its main line was to run between Edinburgh, Glasgow and Carlisle.

The Caledonian policy was to capture as much territory in Scotland as possible: they foresaw a "Caledonian system" controlled by themselves. At this period it was expected that a district could only support one railway line, so that the first to serve an area would secure a near-monopoly. Even before authorisation the Caledonian made provisional agreements with the promoters of other lines to lease their railways. This was done by agreeing a guaranteed periodical lease payment; it did not require money at the time of making the agreement, but it incurred a financial obligation later.

=== Authorisation ===
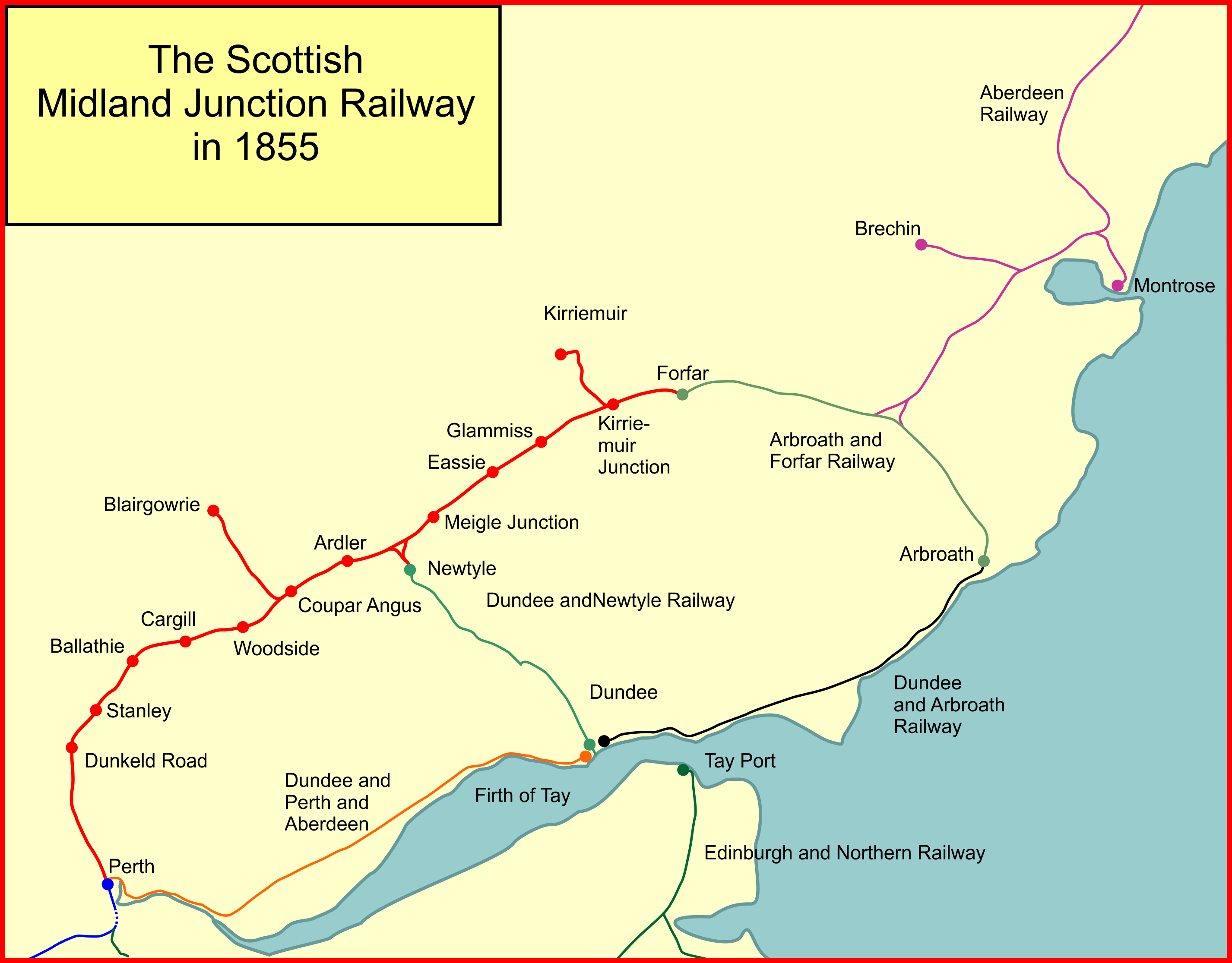
System map of the SMJR in 1855

In the 1845 session of Parliament, a large number of Scottish trunk lines were proposed. In the period prior to the hearings, discussions about alliances and leases accelerated. The Scottish Central Railway was to build from Perth to Castlecary where it would join the Edinburgh and Glasgow Railway and the Caledonian Railway, and it had discussed merging with the Scottish Midland Junction but at the same time it discussed leasing its line to the E&GR or the Caledonian.

Scottish Midland Junction Railway Act 1845
- Act of Parliament
- Parliament of the United Kingdom
- Long title: An Act for making a Railway for the City or Royal Burgh of Perth to or near to the Town or Royal Burgh of Forfar.
- Citation: 8 & 9 Vict. c. clxx

Dates
- Royal assent: 31 July 1845

Text of statute as originally enacted

The Scottish Midland Junction Railway was authorised by the Scottish Midland Junction Railway Act 1845 (8 & 9 Vict. c. clxx) on 31 July 1845, with capital of £300,000, for a line just over 30 miles (48 km) in length from Perth to Forfar. At Perth it was to connect with the Scottish Central Railway (SCR) and at Forfar with the Arbroath and Forfar Railway which gave rail access on to Aberdeen over the Aberdeen Railway. The Scottish Central Railway and the Caledonian Railway were also authorised on 31 July 1845.

Newtyle and Coupar Angus Railway Act 1835
- Act of Parliament
- Parliament of the United Kingdom
- Long title: An Act for making and maintaining a Railway from Newtyle to Coupar Angus in the County of Forfar.
- Citation: 5 & 6 Will. 4. c. lxxxiv

Dates
- Royal assent: 21 July 1835

Text of statute as originally enacted

Newtyle and Glammis Railway Act 1835
- Act of Parliament
- Parliament of the United Kingdom
- Long title: An Act for making and maintaining a Railway from Newtyle to the Muir of Eassie, and from thence to the Muir of Glammiss, in the County of Forfar.
- Citation: 5 & 6 Will. 4. c. xcii

Dates
- Royal assent: 30 July 1835

Text of statute as originally enacted

The Dundee and Newtyle Railway had been built in 1831 to connect the growing Burgh of Dundee with the fertile broad valley of Strathmore; it terminated at Newtyle which was then no more than a farm, intended as a railhead. This proved unpopular and two nominally independent extension railways were built, the Newtyle and Coupar Angus Railway, authorised by the Newtyle and Coupar Angus Railway Act 1835 (5 & 6 Will. 4. c. lxxxiv), and the Newtyle and Glammis Railway, authorised by the Newtyle and Glammis Railway Act 1835 (5 & 6 Will. 4. c. xcii). (Glammis is spelt Glamis nowadays.) These railways opened in 1837, but they hardly added to the traffic of the Dundee line.

Leaving Newtyle the two lines turned away from one another and together formed a nearly straight axis that suited the intended route of the SMJR; the Scottish Midland Junction Railway Act 1845 (8 & 9 Vict. c. clxx) empowered the SMJR to acquire them and incorporate their lines into the SMJR main line.

=== A possible lease ===
After lengthy discussions, the SMJR agreed to lease its line to the Scottish Central Railway by decision of 18 February 1847; the lease charge was to be 6% on the SMJR capital of £600,000. (Note: From Ross (2014), p. 39; the capital quoted is at considerable variance from Carter. On page 45 Ross (2014) quotes the SMJR capital as £500,000.)

The Caledonian had assumed that it was going to lease the Scottish Central Railway, but this was not confirmed. The SCR lease of the SMJR seems not to have proceeded, for in 1848 the Caledonian was negotiating to lease the SMJR direct, and on 5 May 1848 agreement was finalised; the Caledonian would pay 6% on the SMJR capital, now quoted as £500,000. The lease arrangement was modified to be joint with the Edinburgh and Glasgow Railway on an agreed traffic sharing system; but it needed to be ratified by Parliament.

=== Opening ===
The two Newtyle lines had been constructed to the track gauge of 4 ft 6 1/2 in (1,384 mm) as a single line using stone block sleepers. This had to be converted to a more robust track construction as a double line; they were closed in 1847 for the purpose. The SMJR main line, including the converted sections, was opened on 20 August 1848. Through trains started to run from Glasgow and Edinburgh to Forfar over the line and the SCR. However, in 1849 it was reported that "many of the stations were unfinished and there was virtually no goods traffic".

=== The lease rejected by Parliament ===
The Caledonian Railway relations with the Edinburgh and Glasgow were somewhat stormy, and lurched from friendly to hostile. The lease of the SMJR required parliamentary authorisation, and a joint bill was prepared for the 1849 session. However, in February 1849 it became clear that any alliance between the Caledonian and the E&GR was impossible and the Caledonian declined to proceed with the bill, and the lease.

In 1854 the SCR was still independent, and was negotiating with the SMJR for an amalgamation of the two companies. At this time the attitude of Parliament was hostile to mergers of railways, and the proposal was rejected.

From this time there was a "loose amalgamation" between the SCR, the SMJR and the Aberdeen Railway: they worked collaboratively but remained separate companies. This ended on 29 July 1856 when they formally amalgamated, to form the Scottish North Eastern Railway.

=== Branches ===
Scottish Midland Junction Railway Branches Act 1846
- Act of Parliament
- Parliament of the United Kingdom
- Long title: An Act to enable the Scottish Midland Junction Railway Company to make certain Branch Railways; and to amend the Act relating to such Railway.
- Citation: 9 & 10 Vict. c. lxxv

Dates
- Royal assent: 26 June 1846

Scottish Midland Junction Railway (Amendment and Branches) Act 1848
- Act of Parliament
- Parliament of the United Kingdom
- Long title: An Act to enable the Scottish Midland Junction Rail way Company to make Branch Railways to Birnam and to the Dunkeld Branch of the Scottish Midland Junction Railway, and also to abandon Portion of the original Line of the said Dunkeld Branch.
- Citation: 11 & 12 Vict. c. lxxii

Dates
- Royal assent: 22 July 1848

Text of statute as originally enacted

Scottish Midland Junction Railway Branches and Amendment Act 1853
- Act of Parliament
- Parliament of the United Kingdom
- Long title: An Act to enable the Scottish Midland Junction Railway Company to make Branch Railways to Blairgowrie and Kirriemuir; and to amend the Acts relating to such Company; and for other Purposes.
- Citation: 16 & 17 Vict. c. lxxxii

Dates
- Royal assent: 8 July 1853

Text of statute as originally enacted

On 26 June 1846 the SMJR obtained authorisation via the Scottish Midland Junction Railway Branches Act 1846 (9 & 10 Vict. c. lxxv) to build three branches: to Dunkeld, to Kirriemuir and to Blairgowrie. In fact only the Blairgowrie branch was constructed during the lifetime of the SMJR. The Dunkeld branch was actually built by an independent company, the Perth and Dunkeld Railway. It left the SMJR main line at Stanley Junction, and was opened on 7 April 1856. It was worked by the SMJR. The Perth and Dunkeld Railway was taken over in 1864 as part of a scheme to connect Perth and Inverness, by what became the Highland Railway.

The Kirriemuir branch was opened in November 1854. (Note: According to Bradshaw; Quick (2002) says December 1854; Ferguson (2000) says (on page 80) that in November 1854 the SMJR informed Captain Tyler that improvements he had required during a previous inspection had been carried out, and Tyler advised the Board of Trade that the line could open without a re-inspection; Awdry (1990) says November 1855 (on page 102); Cobb (2003) says 1855; Thomas & Turnock (1989) say 12 August 1861 (page 314); Butt says 12 August 1861 (for passengers); Stansfield (2000) says August 1861; Ferguson (2000) is silent on the matter.)

Most trains continued to Forfar, and when the Dundee and Forfar direct line opened, to Dundee.

The Blairgowrie branch left the main line at Coupar Angus; it opened for passengers on 1 August 1855, and for goods on 21 August 1855. Blairgowrie was an industrial centre for jute manufacture, and for soft fruit. The line descended sharply from Coupar Angus to the crossing of the River Isla, and then climbed again to the terminus. The Isla bridge was at first a twelve-span timber viaduct. On 3 February 1881 the river was in spate with large blocks of ice striking the piers of the bridge. The structure survived, but it was replaced by a stone and wrought iron bridge soon afterwards. In later years there were typically five passenger trains daily.

The SMJR had inherited the short branch to Newtyle by its acquisition of the Coupar Angus and Glammiss lines.

Other branches were constructed off the SMJR main line after the company was amalgamated.

== Absorption ==
Scottish North Eastern Railway Act 1856
- Act of Parliament
- Parliament of the United Kingdom
- Long title: An Act to unite and amalgamate the Undertaking of the Scottish Midland Junction Railway Company with the Undertaking of the Aberdeen Railway Company, to be thenceforth called "The Scottish North-eastern Railway Company," and to regulate the Management of and confer additional Powers on the united Company, and for other Purposes.
- Citation: 19 & 20 Vict. c. cxxxiv

Dates
- Royal assent: 29 July 1856

Text of statute as originally enacted

On 29 July 1856 the Scottish North Eastern Railway (SNER) was formed by the Scottish North Eastern Railway Act 1856 (19 & 20 Vict. c. cxxxiv) which amalgamated the SMJR, the Scottish Central Railway and the Aberdeen Railway, forming a continuous line between Perth and Aberdeen. The SNER itself was absorbed by the Caledonian Railway by the Caledonian and Scottish North Eastern Railways Amalgamation Act 1866 (29 & 30 Vict. c. cccl) on 10 August 1866.

== Subsequent history ==
Firmly aligned to the Caledonian Railway, the route formed an important artery feeding Aberdeen traffic to central Scotland and the south. While express passenger trains caught the public eye, there was a substantial goods traffic; cattle were particularly dominant. Large structures on the line were constructed in laminated timber, but in the 1880s these were in poor condition and inadequate for the heavier and faster traffic of those days, and widespread reconstruction in stone and wrought iron was undertaken.

As part of a route between London and Aberdeen, the line was rivalled by the North British Railway route on the east coast via Dundee. As publicity became important, the two routes competed for the title of the fastest transit, and in 1888 and again in 1895 spectacularly fast journeys were made; the rivalry was known as the Railway race to the north.

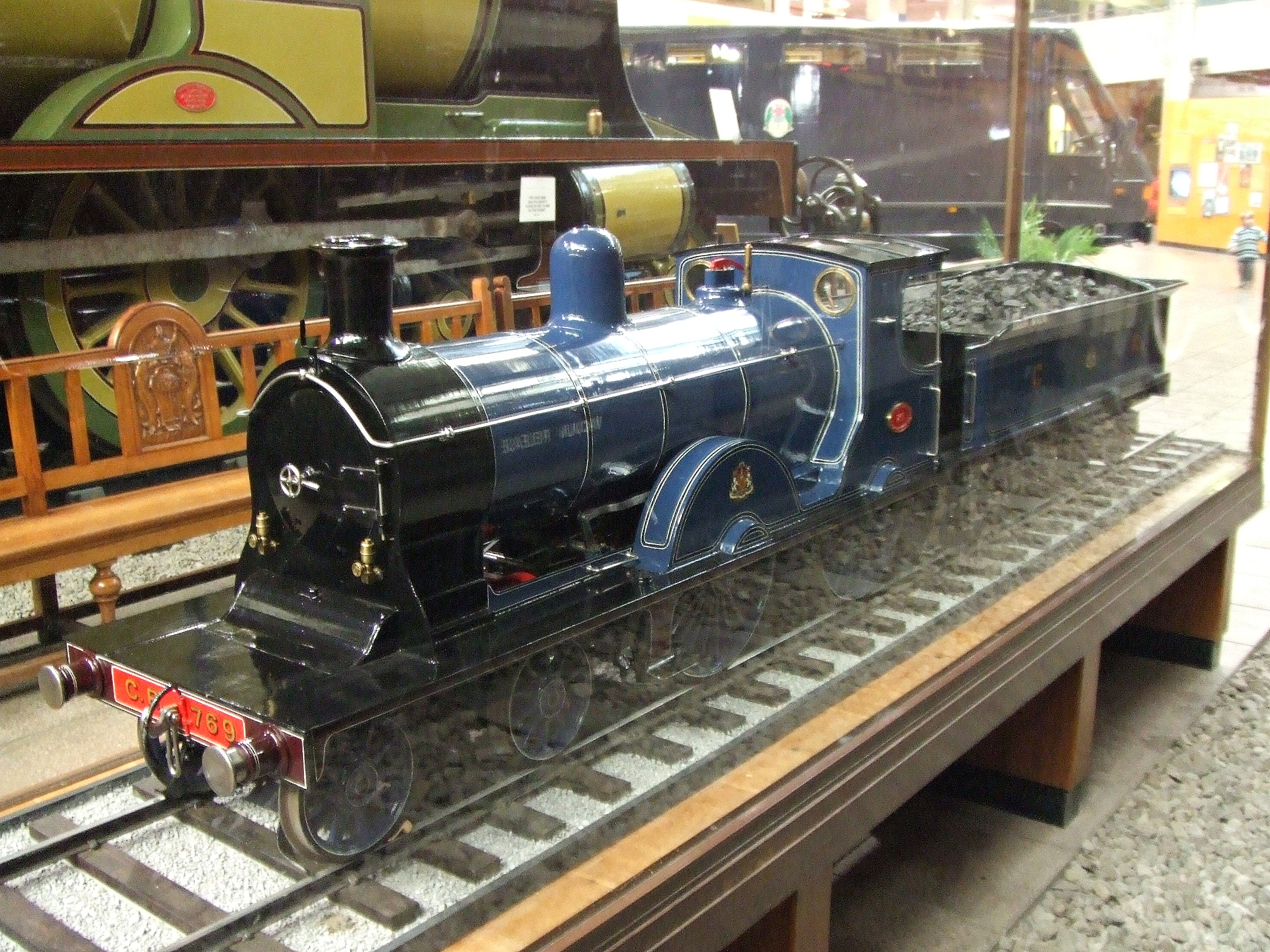
Model of Caledonian Railway Class "769" or "Dunalastair II". At the Museum of Transport, Glasgow, 03/07.

The early passenger engines used on the line were 2-4-0s. At the end of the 19th century and, after the line had been upgraded, the Caledonian Railway introduced the very successful 4-4-0 Dunalastair class of locomotives.

In the late 1950s the line became a speeding ground for the three-hour Glasgow-to-Aberdeen expresses using Gresley A4 Pacifics displaced by dieselisation of long distance main line expresses. The route carried the last regular steam hauled passenger trains timed at over 60 mph (97 km/h).

The Blairgowrie branch closed to passengers on 10 January 1955, and completely on 6 December 1965. The section from Alyth West Junction to Newtyle, the west curve built by the Newtyle and Coupar Angus Railway, was used by Blairgowrie passenger trains and when the Blairgowrie passenger service was discontinued, the curve closed too.

The Kirriemuir branch closed to passengers on 4 August 1952 and completely in 1965.

There were two routes from central Scotland to Aberdeen, and during the process of rationalisation of the railways in the 1960s, the Dundee route was selected. Closure of the SMJR main line was inevitable and took place for passengers on 4 September 1967. The line was retained from Stanley Junction to Forfar for goods trains until 1982.

The Perth to Inverness line used the SMJR route as far as Stanley Junction, north of Perth. That line remains in use and the section from Perth to Stanley Junction is the only part of the SMJR that is still open to traffic.

== Route ==
The line ran from Perth to Forfar, with branches to Kirriemuir, Newtyle and Blairgowrie.

Location	Opened	Closed	Notes
Main line
Perth			Scottish Central Railway station; connects with Dundee and Perth Railway and Scottish Central Railway
Almond Valley Junction			connects with Perth, Almond Valley & Methven Railway
Muirton Halt	1939	21 November 1959	unadvertised halt with limited service
Luncarty	2 August 1848	18 June 1951	
Dunkeld Road	June 1849	13 April 1931	very limited service, sometimes as "Strathord Siding", February 1857 to January 1867; then fully open as Strathord; connects with Bankfoot Railway
Stanley	2 August 1848	11 June 1956	sometimes shown as Stanley Junction; relocated northwards probably in 1857
Stanley Junction			facing junction; connects with Perth and Dunkeld Railway
Ballathie	2 August 1848	July 1868	
Cargill	2 August 1848	11 June 1956	
Woodside	1 January 1858	11 June 1956	renamed Woodside and Burrelton 1905; renamed Burrelton 1927
Coupar Angus	24 April 1837 (N&CAR); 2 August 1848	6 September 1847; 4 September 1967	despite the name the station is in Perthshire; line from Blairgowrie trailed in
Ardler	24 February 1837 (N&CAR); 2 August 1848	6 September 1847; 11 June 1956	
Alyth Junction			connects with Alyth Railway
Washington	24 February 1837	6 September 1847	
Ardler West Junction			facing junction to Newtyle
Meigle	1861	4 September 1967	trailing junction from flyover line from Newtyle; renamed Alyth Junction 1876
Meigle Junction			trailing junction from Newtyle; original Newtyle and Glammiss Railway (N&GR)
Meigle Junction	4 June 1838	1861	replaced by Meigle
Kirkinch	4 June 1838	1847	
Eassie	4 June 1838 (N&GR); 2 August 1848	October 1847; 11 June 1956	
Leason Hill	4 June 1838	1847	
Glammiss	4 June 1838 (N&GR)	11 June 1956	soon renamed Glamis
Kirriemuir Junction	December 1854	June 1864?	Kirriemuir branch trailed in; may have been retained as an exchange station
Forfar South Junction	1895		connects with Forfar and Brechin Railway
Forfar	2 August 1848	4 September 1967	known at first as Forfar Joint
Forfar East Junction			connects with existing Arbroath and Forfar Railway
Blairgowrie branch
Blairgowrie	1 August 1855	10 January 1955	
Rosemount	September 1857	10 January 1955	later Rosemount Halt
Coupar Angus			see Main line
Kirriemuir branch	December 1854	4 August 1952	remained open for goods
Kirriemuir			
Kirriemuir Junction			see Main line
