= List of castles in Angus =

This is a list of castles in Angus, Scotland.

== List ==
Name	Type	Date	Condition	Ownership	Location	Notes	Picture
Affleck Castle	L-plan tower house	15th century	In use as a residence	Private	Monikie; NO494388		
Airlie Castle	Country house	1793	In use as a residence	Private	Alyth; NO292521		
Aldbar Castle		c. 16th century					
Ardestie Castle		c. 15th century					
Auchmull Castle		c. 16th century					
Auchterhouse Castle		c. 13th century					
Auchtermeggities Castle		unknown					
Baikie Castle		unknown					
Balcraig Castle		unknown					
Balfour Castle	Baronial house	c. 16th century	Ruined	Private	Balfour Mains; NO33775460		
Balintore Castle	Sporting Lodge	c. 19th century	Under restoration	Private	NO290590		
Ballinshoe Tower		unknown					
Ballumbie Castle	Courtyard castle	c. 15th century	Ruined	Private	NO44643448		
Bannatyne House		unknown					
Barnyards Castle		unknown					
Black Jack's Castle		unknown					
Blackness Manor House		unknown					
Bolshan Castle		unknown					
Bonnyton Castle		unknown					
Boysack Castle		unknown					
Braikie Castle		unknown					
Brandy Den Castle		unknown					
Brechin Castle	Country house	1709	In use as a residence	Earl of Dalhousie	Brechin; NO597599		
Careston Castle	Country house	17th-19th century			Careston; NO530598		
Carmyllie Castle							
Carnegie Castle							
Castle of Downie							
Castleton of Eassie							
Claverhouse Castle, Glamis							
Clova Castle							
Colliston Castle	Z-plan tower house	1545	Occupied		Arbroath; NO612464	On hire as a venue for receptions	
Cortachy Castle	Z-plan courtyard castle	16th century, 19th century		Earl of Airlie	Kirriemuir; NO397595		
Cossans Castle							
Craig Castle							
Craig House, Angus							
Edzell Castle	Courtyard castle	16th century	Ruined	Historic Scotland	Edzell; NO584691	Includes a unique Renaissance garden	
Ethie Castle		14th century and later	In use as a hotel	Private	Inverkeilor; NO687468		
Farnell Castle		16th century			Farnell; NO624555		
Finavon Castle	Baronial house	1856	In use as a residence	Private	Finavon; NO494564	Ruined earlier castle nearby	
Forfar Castle		11th century	No remains	N/A	Forfar; NO456508	Location recorded in the name of Castle Street, Forfar	
Glamis Castle	Baronial house	14th century	In use as a residence	Earl of Strathmore and Kinghorne	Glamis; NO384479		
Guthrie Castle	Baronial house	1848	In use as a residence	Private	Guthrie; NO562504	Incorporates earlier structure	
Hatton Castle	Z-plan tower house	1575	Restored as a residence	Private	Newtyle; NO302411		
Invermark Castle	Tower house	1526	Ruined	Private	Glen Mark; NO442806		
Inverquharity Castle	L-plan tower house	1440s	Restored as a residence	Private	Kirriemuir; NO411579	An attached wing dates to the 16th century, but was rebuilt in the 20th century	
Kinnaird Castle	Castellated mansion	1855	In use as a residence	Earl of Southesk	Brechin; NO634571	Incorporates earlier structure	
Melgund Castle	Tower house	16th century	Restored as a residence	Private	Aberlemno; NO545563		
Montrose Castle		12th century	No remains	N/A	Montrose, Angus; NO710573		
Red Castle	Tower house	15th century	Ruined		Inverkeilor; NO688510		

== See also ==
- Castles in Scotland
- List of castles in Scotland
- List of listed buildings in Angus

== Bibliography ==
- Coventry, Martin (2001) The Castles of Scotland, 3rd Ed. Scotland: Goblinshead ISBN 1-899874-26-7
- Coventry, Martin (2010) Castles of the Clans Scotland: Goblinshead ISBN 1-899874-36-4
- Pattullo, Nan (1974) Castles, Houses and Gardens of Scotland Edinburgh: Denburn Press
