= List of castles in Perth and Kinross =

This is a list of castles in Perth and Kinross, Scotland.

== List ==
Name	Type	Date	Condition	Ownership	Location	Notes	Picture
Ardblair Castle	L-plan castle (with added wing)	16th century			Blairgowrie; NO1626144504		
Arnot Tower		current building dates from c. 1507, though fortifications were present c. 1400	Ruin	private	nr Kinross; NO2060201664	built by Arnot family	
Ashintully Castle	Fortified tower house	1583			Kirkmichael, nr Blairgowrie; NO1000061300	built by Spalding family	
Balhousie Castle		< 1681 (rebuilt 1862-63)		Black Watch regimental trustees	Perth; NO1143824387	Regimental headquarters and museum of the Black Watch	
Balmanno Castle							
Balthayock Castle			Unoccupied				
Balvaird Castle				Private (but managed by Historic Scotland)	NO1697711527	limited access	
Blackcraig Castle	Tower house	16th century		Private (rooms for let)	Blairgowrie; NO1080253451	was the seat of the Barony of Balmachreuchie	
Blair Castle		1269	Preserved	Blair Charitable Trust	Blair Atholl; NN8656266209	The ancient seat of the Dukes and Earls of Atholl and home to Europe's only private army, the Atholl Highlanders	
Burleigh Castle			Ruin	Historic Scotland	NO1289104594	free access	
Black Castle of Moulin		circa 1326	Ruin		Moulin, Pitlochry; NN9471958913		
Castle Cluggy		pre 1467	Ruin		Dry Isle, Loch Monzievaird, Ochertyre		
Castle Huntly		15th century	In use as a prison	Scottish Prison Service	Carse of Gowrie; NO3020129102		
Craighall Castle							
Dalnaglar Castle					Kirkmichael, nr Blairgowrie; NO1458864723		
Drummond Castle					NN8453418060		
Dupplin Castle							
Elcho Castle	Tower house			Historic Scotland	NO1632020783	Decorative plasterwork	
Finlarig Castle	L-plan tower house	early 17th century	substantial collapse		Killin; NN5785433788		
Forter Castle					Folda; NO1823964640		
Huntingtower Castle				Historic Scotland	NO0826225123	painted ceiling	
Inverquiech Castle		13th century	Ruin				
Kinclaven Castle		13th century	Ruin		NO1581337730		
Kinfauns Castle				Private	NO1502022633		
Kinnaird Castle, Kinnaird		15th century	Restored	Private	NO22NW 24 24122 28904		
Lochleven Castle			Ruin	Historic Scotland	NO137017		
Meggernie Castle					NN5537746038		
Megginch Castle					NO2418924597		
Castle Menzies					NN8320049500		
Methven Castle					NO0417126038		
Murthly Castle				private house	Murthly; NO0718739801		
Newton Castle	Z-plan tower house	16th century		private house	Blairgowrie; NO1716945273		
Old Clunie Castle		13th century	Ruin		Clunie		
Perth Castle		pre-11th century	No remains		Perth; NO1178223799		
Taymouth Castle					Kenmore; NN7845246545		
Tower of Lethendy		17th century	Incorporated in later mansion		Blairgowrie		
Tullibole Castle					Crook of Devon; NO0526800575		

== See also ==
- Castles in Scotland
- List of castles in Scotland
- List of listed buildings in Perth and Kinross
