= English invasion of Scotland (1296) =

Military victory by Edward I of England

English invasion of Scotland of 1296
- Part of First War of Scottish Independence
Date	1296
Location	Scotland
Result	English occupation

Belligerents
Kingdom of Scotland	Kingdom of England

Commanders and leaders
John Balliol (POW)	Edward I of England

The English invasion of Scotland of 1296 was a military campaign undertaken by Edward I of England in retaliation to the Scottish treaty with France (the Auld Alliance) and the renouncing of fealty of John, King of Scotland and Scottish raids into Northern England.

The Scottish army was defeated at the Battle of Dunbar, with Edward I effectively subjugating Scotland and forcing the surrender of John, King of Scotland, before heading back to England, with Scotland's regalia items and a large number of the Scots nobility, as prisoners of war.

== Background ==
=== Competitors for the Crown of Scotland ===
Upon the death of King Alexander III of Scotland in 1286, the crown of Scotland passed to his only surviving descendant, his three-year-old granddaughter Margaret. With the death of Queen Margaret in 1290, on her way to Scotland, the Guardians of Scotland, who feared civil war over the vacant throne of Scotland, called upon King Edward I of England, to decide between various competitors for the Scottish throne in a process known as the Great Cause. John Balliol by tradition of primogeniture, was acknowledged as the King of Scotland by Edward I on 17 November 1292 and he was inaugurated accordingly at Scone, 30 November 1292 upon St Andrew's Day. Edward I, had coerced recognition as Lord Paramount of Scotland, the feudal superior of the realm as part of the arbitration process.

=== Treaty of Paris ===
By 1295, King John of Scotland and the Scottish Council of Twelve felt that Edward I of England sought to subjugate Scotland. Edward asserted his authority over Scotland, requiring appeals on cases ruled on by the court of guardians that had governed Scotland during the interregnum, to be heard in England. In a case brought by Macduff, son of Malcolm, Earl of Fife, Edward demanded that King John appear in person before the English Parliament to answer the charges. King John refused to appear in person, sending instead Henry, Abbot of Arbroath. Edward I also demanded that the Scottish magnates provide military service in the war against France. In response Scotland sought alliances with King Philippe IV of France, with embassies sent in October 1295, that resulted in the Treaty of Paris in February 1296.

== Prelude ==
Upon the discovery of the alliance of Scotland with France, Edward I ordered an English army to muster in Newcastle upon Tyne in March 1296. Edward I also demanded the Scottish border castles of Roxburgh, Jedburgh and Berwick be handed over to English forces.

A Scottish army led by John Comyn, Earl of Buchan, invaded England on 26 March 1296 and attacked Carlisle. The Governor of Carlisle Castle, Robert de Brus, Earl of Carrick, withheld the siege for four days. The Scottish army withdrew, after setting fire to the town, as they had no siege engines. They had also burnt the town of Tindale. Another Scottish army committed many atrocities during raids into Northumberland from 8 April, burning the town of Corbridge, two monasteries and laying siege to take Harbottle Castle.

== Invasion ==
The English army crossed the Tweed River on 28 March 1296 and proceeded to the priory of Coldstream, staying there overnight. The English army then marched towards the town of Berwick, Scotland's most important trading port, at that time. Berwick's garrison was commanded by William the Hardy, Lord of Douglas, while the English army was led by Robert de Clifford, 1st Baron de Clifford. The English succeeded in entering the town and began to sack Berwick, with contemporary accounts of the number of townspeople slain range from between 4,000 and 17,000. The English then began a siege of Berwick Castle, whereupon Douglas surrendered it upon conditions that his life and those of his garrison were spared.

Edward I and the English army remained at Berwick for a month, supervising the strengthening of its defences. On 5 April, Edward I received a message from the Scottish king renouncing his homage to Edward I. After not being able to force battle with the Scots, Edward I decided to take the battle to the Scots. The next objective was Patrick, Earl of March's castle at Dunbar, a few miles up the coast from Berwick, then occupied by the Scots. The Earl of March himself had sided with the English, however his wife, Marjory Comyn, daughter of Alexander Comyn, Earl of Buchan, did not share her husband's political loyalties and had allowed the Scots to occupy the castle. Edward I sent one of his chief lieutenants, John de Warenne, 6th Earl of Surrey, who was John Balliol's own father-in-law, northwards with a strong force of knights to lay siege to the stronghold. The Dunbar defenders sent messages to King John, who had caught up with the main body of the Scottish army at Haddington, requesting urgent assistance. In response the Scots army advanced to the rescue of Dunbar Castle. King John did not accompany the army.

The two armies came met each other on 27 April and gave battle, near Dunbar. The Scots occupied a strong position on some high ground to the west. Surrey's cavalry had to cross a gully intersected by the Spott Burn. As they did so their ranks broke up, and the Scots, deluded into thinking the English were leaving the field, abandoned their position in a disorderly downhill charge, only to find that Surrey's forces had reformed on Spottsmuir and were advancing in perfect order. The English routed the disorganised Scots in the charge. The action was brief, with the only casualty of any note being the Lothian knight, Sir Patrick de Graham. A large number of Scottish lords, knights and men-at-arms were taken prisoner, including John Comyn, Lord of Badenoch and the earls of Atholl, Ross and Menteith, Richard Suart and William de Saintclair. Those who did escape, fled westwards to the safety of Ettrick Forest. Those captured were sent into captivity in England.

Edward I arrived at Dunbar on 28 April, with the castle surrendering. Edward I travelled to Haddington (1 May), then to Lauder, Roxburgh Castle, where James Stewart, 5th High Steward of Scotland handed the castle over to the English. After travelling to Jedburgh Castle, Wyel, Castleton, and back via Wyel to Jedborough and Roxburgh, the English army travelled to Lauder, then the abbey of Newbattle and to Edinburgh, where they laid siege to Edinburgh Castle. After five days of siege the castle surrendered. The English then set about laying siege to Linlithgow. Edward I then travelled to Stirling, where the deserted castle was surrendered by the porter. Malise III, Earl of Strathearn, presented himself to Edward I at Stirling and did homage.

Edward I then travelled to Auchterarder, then Perth, Kinclaven, Clunie, Inverquiech; Forfar, Farnell and then to Montrose. John and the leading nobles of Scotland presented themselves to Edward I at Stracathro Churchyard in July and surrendered. John was stripped of the symbols of power, the Scottish crown taken, the insignia ripped from his surcoat, leading to his nickname ‘toom tabard’ (empty coat), before he and much of the Scots nobility were taken south to the Tower of London or English castles. Edward I then travelled to Kincardine in the Mearns, Glenbervie, Durris and Aberdeen, where Thomas Morham, whom Hugh de Saint John had captured together with eleven others in arms were placed into captivity.

Edward I then travelled to Kintore, Fyvie castle, Banff castle, Cullen, Rapenach and Elgin. On 29 July he was at Rothes. where he sent a force under the command of John de Cantilupe, Hugh le Despencer and John Hastings into the Badenoch district. Edward I and the bishop of Durham travelled over the mountains via Invercharrach, Kildrummy, Kincardine in the Mearns, Brechin; the abbey of Aberbroth, Dundee; Baligerny, Perth, the abbey of Lindores, St. Andrews, Markinch, the abbey of Dunfermline, Stirling, Linlithgow, Edinburgh, Haddington; Pinkerton, Coldingham before finally returning to Berwick, having subjugated the Eastern and South Eastern half of Scotland.

== Aftermath ==
At Berwick, Edward I held parliament, where all the bishops, earls, barons, abbots, and priors, undertook homage and swore oaths that they would be loyal to Edward I. Edward I allowed the nobility to remain in possession of their lands, provided they came to the parliament. Edward I appointed John de Warenne, 6th Earl of Surrey, as guardian of Scotland, with Hugh de Cressingham as treasurer and Walter de Amersham as chancellor. Edward I returned to England on 16 September.

Edward I had crushed the Scots army, with many of the Scots nobility in captivity, he set about stripping Scotland of its statehood of identity, with the removal of the Stone of Destiny, the Scottish crown, the Black Rood of St Margaret all taken from Scotland and sent to Westminster Abbey, England.

The English occupation led to revolts during 1297 in northern and southern Scotland led by Andrew Moray in the north and William Wallace in the south. Most of Scotland north of the Forth, except for Dundee and some castle strongholds, were under the control of the Moray and Wallace. The English guardian of Scotland John de Warenne, marched north with an army resulting in the battle of Stirling Bridge, where the English were defeated, causing Edward I to prepare for a future invasion of Scotland in 1298.
