= List of listed buildings in Alyth, Perth and Kinross =

This is a list of listed buildings in the parish of Alyth in Perth and Kinross, Scotland.

== List ==
Name	Location	Date Listed	Grid Ref. (Note: Sometimes known as OSGB36, the grid reference (where provided) is based on the British national grid reference system used by the Ordnance Survey. • "Guide to National Grid". Ordnance Survey. • "Get-a-map". Ordnance Survey.)	Geo-coordinates	Notes	LB Number (Note: Historic Environment Scotland assign a unique alphanumeric identifier to each designated site in Scotland, for listed buildings this always begins with "LB", for example "LB12345".)	Image
Mill Of Quiech (Or Balloch Mill) Bridge Over Quiech Burn				56°37′52″N 3°11′20″W	Category C(S)	4362	Upload Photo
Symbol Stone 1/4 Mile South Of Bruceton Farmhouse				56°38′24″N 3°09′34″W	Category B	4366	Upload Photo
Drumfork House				56°43′20″N 3°23′31″W	Category B	4372	Upload Photo
Bridge Of Tully Over Alyth Burn				56°37′33″N 3°15′39″W	Category C(S)	4375	Upload Photo
Balhary Stables And Coachman's Cottage				56°36′22″N 3°12′05″W	Category B	4380	Upload Photo
Balhary, Gardeners' Cottages				56°36′22″N 3°12′09″W	Category B	4384	Upload Photo
Jordanstone Entrance Gates				56°36′42″N 3°11′20″W	Category C(S)	4388	Upload Photo
Bridge Of Ruim Over Quiech Burn (Variously Spelt Also Rome Or Room				56°37′47″N 3°11′32″W	Category A	53	Upload Photo
Eildon, Old Bridge Lane				56°37′27″N 3°13′54″W	Category C(S)	21053	Upload Photo
Balhary House				56°36′20″N 3°12′00″W	Category A	4379	Upload Photo
Jordanstone Sundial				56°36′45″N 3°11′16″W	Category B	4387	Upload Photo
Hallyards House				56°36′26″N 3°10′31″W	Category B	4389	Upload Photo
Alyth High Parish Church, Entrance Gate				56°37′28″N 3°14′07″W	Category B	21038	Upload Photo
Old Market Cross, The Cross, Alyth				56°37′31″N 3°13′55″W	Category B	21040	Upload another image
Losset Road, Losset Inn				56°37′28″N 3°13′52″W	Category B	21054	Upload Photo
Bamff Road Bridge Over Alyth Burn				56°37′25″N 3°14′00″W	Category B	21057	Upload Photo
Bamff House				56°38′55″N 3°16′15″W	Category B	4368	Upload another image
Bamff House, Icehouse				56°38′51″N 3°16′30″W	Category C(S)	4370	Upload Photo
Boat House, Drumore Loch				56°43′55″N 3°22′00″W	Category B	4373	Upload Photo
Craigellie House Lodge				56°37′33″N 3°15′33″W	Category C(S)	4377	Upload Photo
Pitcrocknie Bridge Over Alyth Burn				56°37′31″N 3°12′26″W	Category B	4392	Upload Photo
Balloch Bridge Over Alyth Burn				56°37′44″N 3°11′40″W	Category C(S)	4393	Upload Photo
Balendoch House				56°36′56″N 3°09′49″W	Category B	52	Upload Photo
Old Parish Kirk Of St. Moloc's Including Churchyard				56°37′30″N 3°13′57″W	Category B	21039	Upload Photo
H. Beats, The Cross				56°37′30″N 3°13′55″W	Category B	21041	Upload Photo
21, 23 Toutie Street				56°37′29″N 3°13′54″W	Category C(S)	21043	Upload Photo
Millhaugh Saw Mill, Former Cornmill, Bamff Road				56°37′27″N 3°14′08″W	Category C(S)	21058	Upload Photo
St. Ninians Episcopal Church, St. Ninians Road				56°37′15″N 3°13′44″W	Category B	21059	Upload Photo
Alyth War Memorials Alyth				56°37′21″N 3°13′51″W	Category C(S)	4364	Upload Photo
Bamff House Sundial				56°38′55″N 3°16′17″W	Category C(S)	4369	Upload Photo
Drumfork Bridge Over Black Water				56°43′25″N 3°23′45″W	Category B	4371	Upload Photo
Bardmony Bank House				56°35′32″N 3°13′21″W	Category B	4378	Upload Photo
7 Bamff Wynd, Woolmarket				56°37′31″N 3°14′01″W	Category B	21045	Upload Photo
1 Hill Street And Laurelbank				56°37′31″N 3°13′54″W	Category B	21046	Upload Photo
3 Chapel Street				56°37′27″N 3°13′59″W	Category C(S)	21049	Upload Photo
Lands Of Loyal Hotel, Alyth				56°37′45″N 3°13′28″W	Category C(S)	4374	Upload Photo
Balhary, Footbridge Between House And Walled Garden				56°36′19″N 3°12′04″W	Category B	4381	Upload Photo
Alyth High Parish Church				56°37′28″N 3°14′05″W	Category B	21037	Upload another image
Blythill (2 Houses - Miss Newbigging) Old Bridge Lane				56°37′28″N 3°13′55″W	Category C(S)	21052	Upload Photo
16 Commercial Street				56°37′24″N 3°13′49″W	Category C(S)	21056	Upload Photo
Alyth School, St. Andrew Street (Original School Only)				56°37′14″N 3°14′00″W	Category B	21060	Upload Photo
5 High Street				56°37′30″N 3°13′59″W	Category B	21044	Upload Photo
Ivybank And 7 Hill Street				56°37′32″N 3°13′53″W	Category C(S)	21047	Upload Photo
Leadenhall, Chapel Street				56°37′29″N 3°13′58″W	Category B	21048	Upload Photo
Old Packbridge Over Alyth Burn				56°37′27″N 3°13′55″W	Category B	21050	Upload another image
Bridge House (Robertson) Old Bridge Lane				56°37′27″N 3°13′55″W	Category B	21051	Upload Photo
Alyth (Barony) Church				56°37′26″N 3°13′51″W	Category B	21055	Upload Photo
Bridge Of Dillavaird Over River Isla				56°38′30″N 3°09′01″W	Category B	4365	Upload Photo
Bamff House South Lodge				56°38′29″N 3°16′12″W	Category C(S)	4367	Upload Photo
Craigellie House				56°37′36″N 3°15′32″W	Category B	4376	Upload Photo
Balhary Walled Garden				56°36′19″N 3°12′08″W	Category B	4382	Upload Photo
Balhary Sundial				56°36′17″N 3°12′06″W	Category B	4383	Upload Photo
Jordanstone House				56°36′45″N 3°11′10″W	Category B	4386	Upload Photo
Milne, The Cross				56°37′30″N 3°13′56″W	Category B	21042	Upload Photo
Inverquiech Castle				56°37′59″N 3°10′43″W	Category B	4363	Upload Photo
Burial Enclosure Of Admiral Knight, Jordanstone				56°36′45″N 3°11′08″W	Category B	4390	Upload Photo
Balendoch Doocot				56°36′57″N 3°09′48″W	Category C(S)	4391	Upload Photo

== Key ==
The scheme for classifying buildings in Scotland is:

- Category A: "buildings of national or international importance, either architectural or historic; or fine, little-altered examples of some particular period, style or building type."
- Category B: "buildings of regional or more than local importance; or major examples of some particular period, style or building type, which may have been altered."
- Category C: "buildings of local importance; lesser examples of any period, style, or building type, as originally constructed or moderately altered; and simple traditional buildings which group well with other listed buildings."

In March 2016 there were 47,288 listed buildings in Scotland. Of these, 8% were Category A, and 50% were Category B, with the remaining 42% being Category C.
