= Kinnaird Castle =

Kinnaird Castle can refer to one of several castles in Scotland:

- Kinnaird Castle, Brechin, Angus
- Kinnaird Castle, Fraserburgh, Aberdeenshire
- Kinnaird Castle, Kinnaird, Kinnaird, Gowrie, Perth & Kinross

== See also ==
- Kinnairdy Castle, Aberdeenshire, Scotland
