= Folda =

Folda may refer to:

== Places ==
- Folda, Angus, a hamlet in Angus, Scotland
- Folda, Nordland, a fjord in Nordland county, Norway
- Folda (Rindal), a river in Møre og Romsdal and Trøndelag counties in Norway
- Folda, Trøndelag, a firth and fjord in Trøndelag county, Norway
- Folda Bridge, a bridge over the Foldafjord in Trøndelag county, Norway

== People ==
- Jaroslav Folda, a historian specializing on the Middle Ages
- John Folda, an American Catholic bishop
