= William Warden =

William Warden may refer to

- William Warden (printer) (1761–1786), American printer in Boston, Massachusetts
- William Warden (Royal Navy officer) (1777–1849), Scottish naval surgeon
