= James Geddes =

James Geddes may refer to:

- James Geddes (engineer) (1763–1838), American engineer, surveyor, New York State legislator and U.S. Congressman
- James Davidson Geddes (c. 1844–1895), Canadian accountant, rancher and politician
- James Lorraine Geddes (1827–1887), British Army and Union Army soldier
- James Young Geddes (1850–1913), Scottish poet
- Jim Geddes (born 1949), American Major League Baseball pitcher
