= Old Clunie Castle =

- Clunie, Perth and Kinross, Scotland

Site information
- Open to the public: Unknown
- Condition: Ruin

Location
- Location within Perth and Kinross
- Coordinates: 56.579744°N 3.449184°W

Old Clunie Castle is a ruined 13th century castle near Clunie, Perth and Kinross, Scotland.

== History ==
Built upon a hillock on the western shores of Loch of Clunie, guarding a trail between the Upper Tay valley and Strathmore. The castle replaced a hunting lodge used by Kenneth MacAlpin, King of the Picts, as a base for hunting in the nearby royal forest of Clunie. King Edward I of England stayed four nights in 1296 at the castle during his invasion of Scotland, before travelling to Inverquiech Castle.

After becoming disused, a new L-plan tower house castle for the Bishops of Dunkeld was built in the 16th century on a crannog within the adjacent loch.
