= Alyth Town Hall =

Municipal Building in Alyth, Scotland

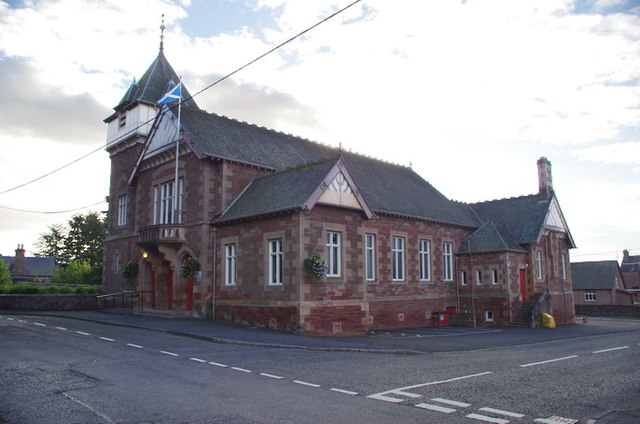
- Alyth Town Hall

- Shown in Perth and Kinross Alyth Town Hall (Scotland)
- 56.6215°N 3.2321°W
- Location: Albert Street, Alyth

History
- Built: 1887 (139 years ago)

Site notes
- Architect(s): Andrew Heiton and Andrew Granger Heiton
- Architectural style: Tudor Revival style

Alyth Town Hall is a municipal structure in Albert Street in Alyth, Scotland. The structure, which is currently used as a community events venue, is not yet listed.

== History ==
The building was commissioned as a result of a local initiative to raise money for a burgh hall in 1884. The site chosen by the burgh leaders was open land at the corner of Albert Street and Alexandra Street. The foundation stone for the new building was laid by the Earl of Airlie on 2 September 1886 and a bazaar was held in the local school to celebrate the event. It was designed by Andrew Heiton and his nephew, Andrew Granger Heiton, in the Tudor Revival style, built in red sandstone and was officially opened on 29 April 1887.

The design involved an asymmetrical main frontage facing onto Albert Street; the central bay featured three arched doorways with architraves separated by brackets supporting a canted balcony. There was a central five-part window on the second floor and a half-timbered gable above. The left-hand bay featured a three-stage bell tower with a lancet window in the first stage, a three-part window in the second stage and half-timbered section which was slightly jettied out in the third stage. The tower was surmounted by a pyramid-shaped roof and a weather vane. The right-hand section, which was slightly recessed and only single-storey, comprised two bays each with casement windows. Internally, the principal rooms were the grand hall, the council chambers and the lesser hall.

A bell from the French frigate La Nécessité, which had been captured by the crew of the fifth-rate, HMS Horatio, on 21 February 1810 during the Napoleonic Wars, was installed in the bell tower. It had been recovered by the former purser of HMS Horatio and carefully preserved by his family, who lived locally, for much of the 19th century.

After the Earl of Airlie was killed in action at the Battle of Diamond Hill on 11 June 1900 during the Second Boer War, a meeting was hastily held in the town hall later that month, at which local people demanded, contrary to advice from the War Office that no memorials should be commissioned until after the end of the war, that an obelisk be erected in the Market Square immediately.

Ownership of the town hall was vested in trustees until 1905 when it was presented to the burgh council. The building continued to serve as the meeting place of the burgh council for much of the 20th century but ceased to be the local seat of government when the enlarged Perth and Kinross District Council was formed in 1975. While ownership of the building was retained by the district council, the management of the town hall was passed to the Alyth Halls Association at that time and the administration of the building was passed to a local management committee in 1996. The bell, which had become damaged over time, was moved to the foyer of the town hall in 2000.

Works of art in the town hall include three landscape paintings by the painter, John Geddes.
