= Alyth market cross =

Scottish memorial cross

- Alyth mercat cross
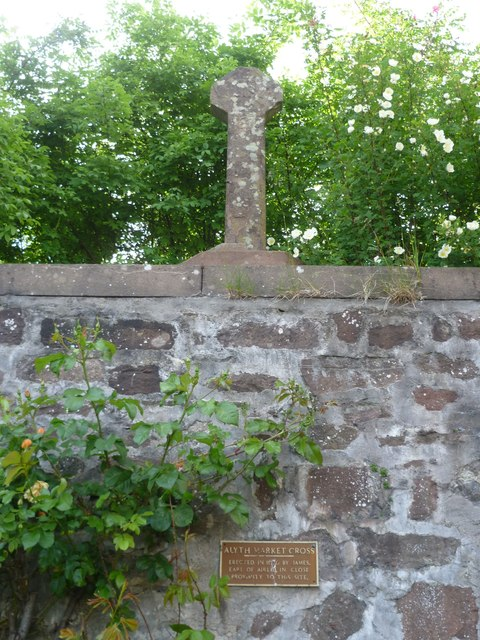
- The cross in 2013

- Location within Perth and Kinross Location within Scotland
- 56.625302°N 3.231884°W
- Location: The Cross, Alyth, Perth and Kinross, Scotland

History
- Built: 1670 (356 years ago)

Alyth market cross is a mercat cross located in Alyth, Perth and Kinross, Scotland. Now Category B listed, it dates to 1670. It has a rectangular shaft three feet and three inches tall (shortened from the original eight inches and standing on a five-inch-tall pedestal). It has an octagonal head, which is inscribed with "E 1A" and a lion rampant. It was erected by James Ogilvy, 2nd Earl of Airlie. It is the initials of Ogilvy's wife that adorn the head of the cross.

Now back near its original location, in an elevated position in a retaining wall, it was moved to Alyth's Albert Street.

== See also ==
- List of listed buildings in Alyth, Perth and Kinross
