= Durris Castle =

Ruined medieval castle in Aberdeenshire, Scotland

- Aberdeenshire, Scotland
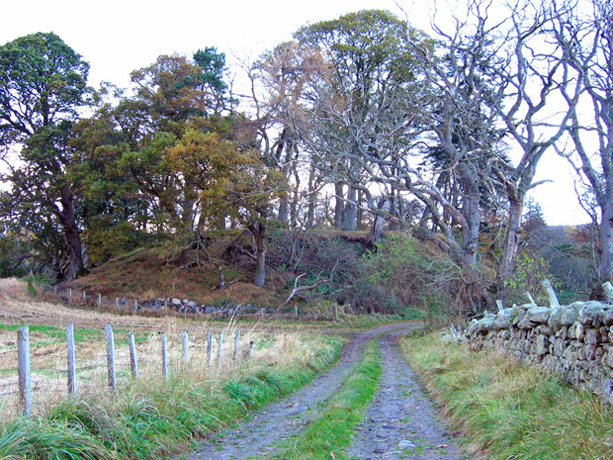
- Castle Hill

Site information
- Open to the public: Unknown
- Condition: Ruin

Location
- Location within Aberdeenshire
- Coordinates: 57.0619°N 2.36495°W

Site history
- Demolished: 17th century

Durris Castle, also known as the House of Dores, was an early royal residence on the southern bank of the River Dee in Aberdeenshire, Scotland. The site consisted of a medieval motte and bailey castle and controlled the northern end of the Crynes Corse Mounth trackway.

== History ==
Dating from at least the 13th century, the castle, a motte and bailey, was occupied by Alexander III and is mentioned in the Chamberlain Rolls of the time as the subject of repairs. King Edward I of England stayed one night in 1296 at the castle, during his invasion of Scotland. Durris was granted to the Fraser family by King Robert I of Scotland and created into a barony by King David II of Scotland.

It was burned by the Marquis of Montrose in 1645 and not rebuilt.

No remains of the castle exist today, but the 7-metre-high conical knoll on which it stood retains the name Castle Hill. The hill has a flattened summit measuring 41 metres by 30 metres, and its sides may have been artificially steepened. Evidence remains on the western side of the site of a 2.6 metre ditch, possibly a moat.
