= Alyth =

Coordinates: 56.623145°N 3.232042°W

Alyth: Scottish Gaelic: Ailt
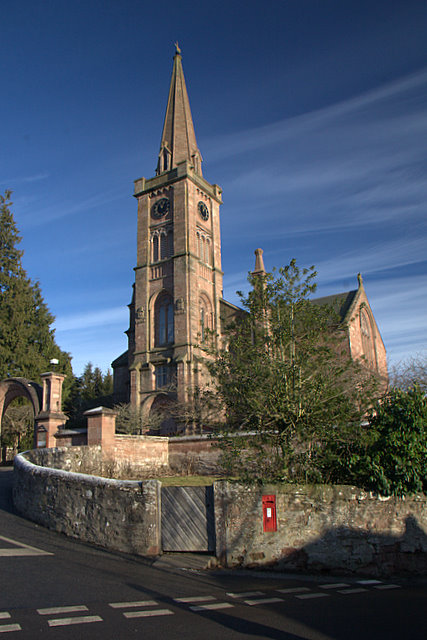
- Alyth Parish Church

- Coat of arms

- Location within Perth and Kinross
- OS grid reference: NO245486
  - Edinburgh: 61 mi (98 km)
  - London: 442 mi (711 km)
- Council area: Perth and Kinross
- Lieutenancy area: Perth and Kinross
- Country: Scotland
- Sovereign state: United Kingdom
- Post town: BLAIRGOWRIE
- Postcode district: PH11
- Dialling code: 01828
- Police: Scotland
- Fire: Scottish
- Ambulance: Scottish
- UK Parliament: Angus and Perthshire Glens
- Scottish Parliament: Perthshire North

Alyth (/ˈeɪlɪθ/) (Scottish Gaelic: Ailt) is a town in Perth and Kinross, Scotland, five miles (eight kilometres) northeast of Blairgowrie and about 17 miles (27 kilometres) northwest of Dundee. In 2022 the town had an estimated population of 3,046.

First mentioned by name in a 12th-century royal charter of William the Lion, Alyth for many centuries was an important market town and entrepôt on long-established drove roads by which Highland farmers brought their sheep and cattle to lowland markets. Another royal charter in 1488, from James III of Scotland granted Alyth the status of Burgh of Barony entitled to stage markets and fairs. The 17th-century stone Packhorse Bridge still stands in the middle of the town (now pedestrian-only), later joined by two other stone bridges for wheeled traffic, emphasising the settlement's importance as a river-crossing.

Agricultural improvements and expanding markets for livestock in the south contributed to Alyth's prosperity during the 18th and early 19th centuries, while water-power provided by the Alyth Burn plus, later, steam-power helped the development of a local textile industry specialising in linen. Steam power also brought the Alyth Railway to the town in 1861, accompanied by growth during the later 19th century in retailing along with hotels for holidaymakers, golfers and country sports enthusiasts.

Today, industry has largely gone, but Alyth retains many shops and businesses serving the local area. The town also has a flourishing community of artists and a growing tourism economy.

The boundaries of Alyth Community Council also encompass the hamlet of New Alyth (population c350), about one mile (1.5 kilometres) southwest of the town, together with a handful of smaller hamlets and steadings giving a total population of just over 3,000.

== History and archaeology ==
In late medieval times Scottish kings used the nearby Forest of Alyth for hunting during their progress around the country. They probably occupied the royal castle of Inverquiech just east of the town (where Edward I of England stayed during his campaign against the Scots in 1296) or the castle of Corb, a royal hunting-lodge in Glenshee in the north-west of the Forest.

Three miles (five kilometres) north of Alyth is Bamff House which has been held by the Ramsay family since 1232, when King Alexander II granted the estate to his physician Nessus de Ramsay. Bamff today is an ecotourism destination and, since 2002, home to a reintroduced population of wild beavers. Bamff is currently undergoing a major 'rewilding' project.

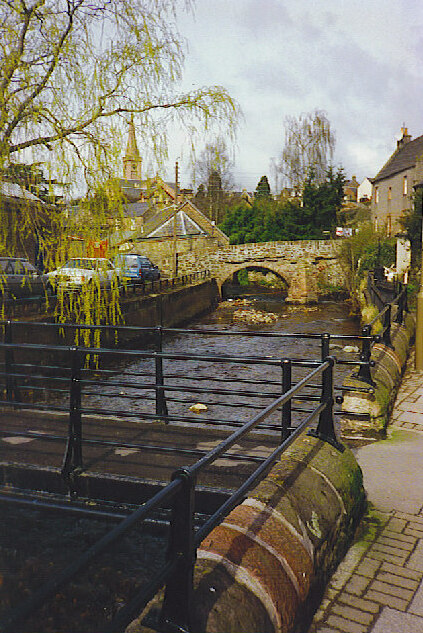
The burn running through Alyth with (background) the 17th-century Pack Bridge

Alyth's Pack Bridge (intended to carry packhorses loaded with sidebags or panniers across the burn) is one of the oldest masonry bridges in Scotland and is shown on maps as far back as 1600.

During the Anglo-Scottish war (1650–1652), part of the War of the Three Kingdoms, the town was the scene of a dramatic incident known as the ‘Onfall of Alyth’ (28 August 1651). The town had been chosen as the rendezvous for the Committee of Estates, effectively the Scottish government at that time, to organise resistance to the English Parliamentarian invasion forces under General Monck, then besieging Dundee. The committee was betrayed and surprised by a force of Parliamentarian cavalry, and in the fighting that ensued the Earl of Leven (commander of the Scottish forces), the Earl of Crawford, the Earl Marischal, Lord Nairne and other prominent persons, including the Minister of Alyth, Rev. John Rattray, were captured and sent to the Tower of London. This event temporarily extinguished the Scottish government of the time.

Next to the Pack Bridge, on Pitnacree Street, is the site of one of the town's two textile mills. In the 18th century, Alyth became heavily involved in flax processing for the linen textile industry, and spinning and especially hand-loom weaving dominated local employment.

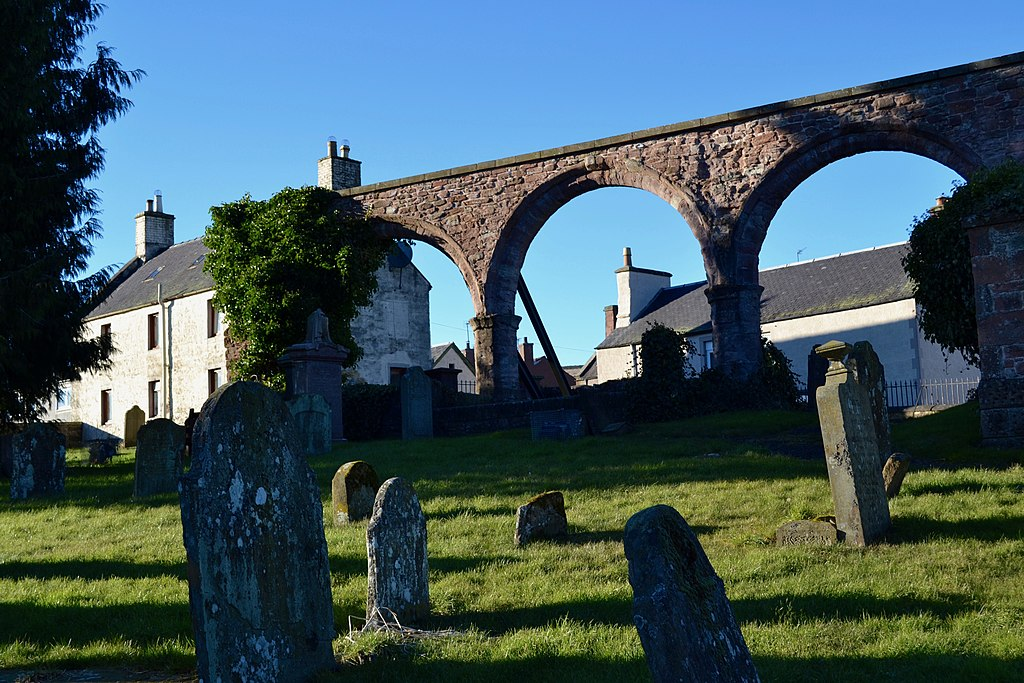
Alyth Arches, the ruins of the former parish church

The Alyth Arches, visible from the centre of the town looking north, stand on the site of what is probably Alyth's oldest Christian church dating back to the 6th century and dedicated to St Moluag, a contemporary of St Columba. They formed part of the old parish church, which was abandoned in 1839 when the present fine new church was erected 200 yards to the west. There are also a number of graves, some of which are of notable local people, including James Sandy, the inventor of the invisible hinge.

The current parish church building, completed in 1839 to the design of Edinburgh architect Thomas Hamilton, dominates the skyline of the town. It is Gothic in style, with Romanesque influences, especially in the windows, and has an unusually high spire. Inside the church is the funerary hatchment of Sir George Ramsay (sixth baronet of Bamff) who was killed in a duel at Musselburgh, in April 1790 - one of the last duelling deaths in Scotland. In the church porch is preserved a late 7th-early 8th-century Pictish cross-slab, with a decorated cross on one face and a single Pictish symbol ('double disc and Z-rod') on the other. It was discovered in Alyth in 1887 when ground was being levelled in front of the manse.

Alyth retains a physical link with the Napoleonic Wars in the form of a church bell from Brittany. It was captured in 1810 from a French frigate taken by HMS Horatio and was sent as a gift to Alyth by John Warden, a son of the owner of the Bamff Arms, who served on the ship. It remains on display in Alyth Town Hall.

During the Second World War, Alyth formed a close bond with units of the Polish armed forces in exile formed from troops escaping from the Nazi conquest of Poland. There was an active Scottish-Polish Society branch in the town, and several memorials were erected to commemorate the bond.

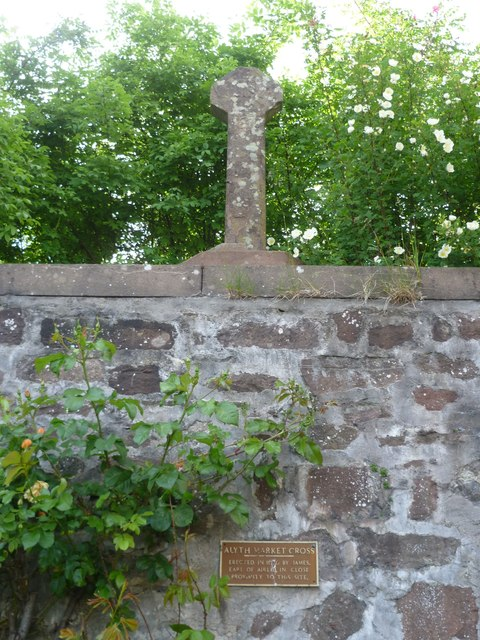
Alyth's mercat cross

Across the road from the entrance to the Alyth Arches stands the town's old mercat cross, which served as a symbolic representation of the right to hold a regular market or fair. The main annual market was held on St Moluag's name day (25 June) every year in the vicinity of the church and nearby Woolmarket.

In the middle of the new Pitcrocknie housing development on the north east edge of the town, is a fine example of a late Neolithic or early Bronze Age Standing Stone. Called the Pitcrocknie Stone it is made out of very fine garnet-bearing schist.

To the northeast of the town a hill fort, possibly of Pictish date or earlier, stands atop Barry (or 'barrow') Hill. It is considered to be one of the best preserved examples of an enclosed hilltop settlement in Scotland. The remains consist of massive collapsed stone ramparts that take advantage of the topography of the Hill. Local legend connects the fort with King Arthur, and Hector Boece's History and Chronicles of Scotland claims that Guanora, the Scottish name for Guinevere, Arthur's queen, was imprisoned here for a very short time(page 86).

Another nearby early medieval feature is a Pictish 'Class I' symbol stone in a field on Bruceton Farm somewhat to the east of Alyth. The southeast face of this slab is incised with two Pictish symbols - an arch with traces of internal ornament above a finely scrolled Pictish beast - and is one of relatively few likely still to be in its original position. It may have marked an ancient burial.

=== Archaeological excavation of a souterrain - Shanzie Farm ===
A late British Iron Age souterrain was excavated by a team of Headland Archaeology in Shanzie Farm, c 3.5. north-east of Alyth. The underground structure was roughly C-shaped in plan and measured c 35 metres in length. There was a single chamber c 5m long and an entrance to the south-east. For the most part, the souterrain had been badly plough truncated and the walls survived as a single course. The northern terminal of the souterrain was better preserved, where 3-4 courses of wall survive. The chamber here narrowed and had been filled with rubble to a depth. The walls also started to corbell inwards indicating this was originally a stone-capped structure rather than timber roofed. No evidence of an associated settlement or any other surface features were identified; these have undoubtedly been lost to the plough. The structure is typical of the 'southern Pictland group'. The souterrain had clearly been broken into during the Victorian period, but also, during medieval times. Finds included several types of late prehistoric pottery, a fragment of probable Roman pottery, an amber ring, a pair of tweezers, a brooch or clasp, two copper alloy rings and a fragment from a quern stone. The souterrain was partially backfilled allowing visitors to see the structure in plan.

== Governance ==
Alyth lies within the Perth & Kinross council area of eastern central Scotland. The town is the second largest settlement within Ward 2 (Strathmore) of Perth & Kinross Council, which is currently (2020) represented by four councillors - two Conservative, one SNP and one Liberal Democrat. Alyth lies within the Perth and North Perthshire constituency of the UK Parliament and the Perthshire North constituency of the Scottish Parliament.

In 1488, King James III made Alyth a Burgh of Barony, a status it retained until 1834 when it became a Police burgh with its own law enforcement and other functions under the Burgh Police (Scotland) Act, 1833. In 1624, the lands around Alyth passed from the Lindsay Earls of Crawford into the hands of the local Ogilvy family, and the first Earl of Airlie acquired the feudal superiority of the burgh. Baron Ogilvy of Alith and Lintrathen remains a subsidiary title of the Earls of Airlie. Throughout these centuries, Alyth was a distinct parish within the Scottish local government system, situated mostly within the historic county of Perthshire but also partly within Forfarshire until 1891 when, under the Local Government (Scotland) Act 1889, it was moved wholly within Perthshire. In 1894, Alyth became a civil parish and later, under the Local Government (Scotland) Act 1929, a 'small burgh' following the abolition of Scotland's parish councils. Almost 80 years later, the Local Government (Scotland) Act 1973 created Alyth Community Council with boundaries taking in the minor settlements of Tullymurdoch and Bamff to the north, Shanzie to the east, and New Alyth, Balhary and Leitfie to the south.

== Geography ==
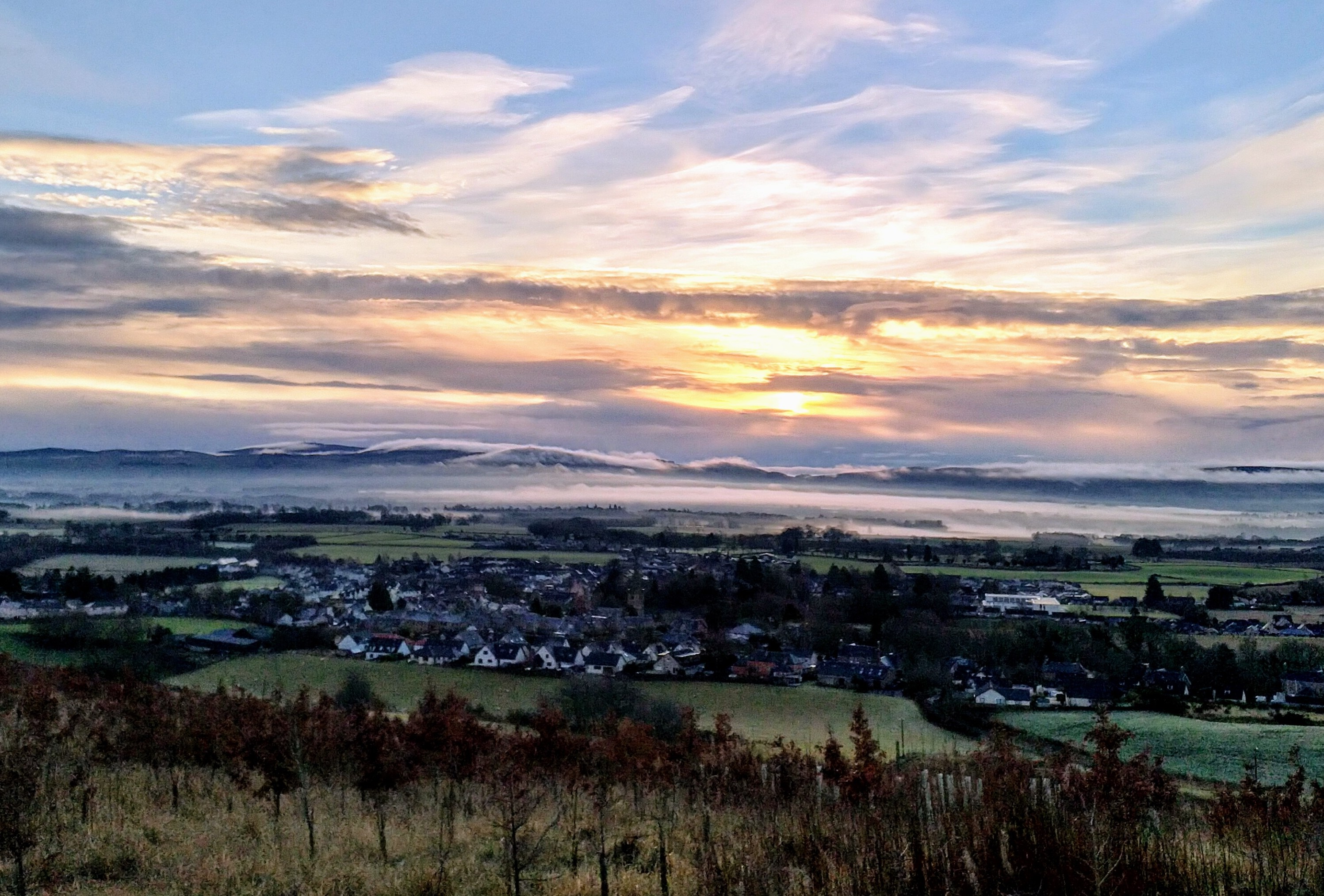
Alyth as seen from Alyth Hill

Alyth lies 61 miles (98 kilometres) north of Edinburgh and 442 miles (711 kilometres) north of London. The town straddles the burn which bears its name, at the point where the burn descends from the Perthshire Highlands to the lowland Vale of Strathmore. Most of the town lies in a shallow, sheltered basin around 330 feet (100 metres) above sea-level, nestled under the Hill of Alyth (970 feet or 295 metres) which is part of the southern edge of the Perthshire Highlands. The underlying geology is Devonian-age Old Red Sandstone (c. 400 million years old) overlain by glacial deposits left behind by the Pleistocene ice ages. Alyth lies just a few miles southeast of the Highland Boundary Fault which divides the Scottish Highlands from the Scottish Lowlands.

The Alyth Burn bisects the town and is crossed by two road bridges and four footbridges, including the 17th-century Packhorse Bridge. Alyth's built environment comprises the mediaeval street pattern northeast of the burn where the ancient drove roads converge on the river crossing, and the more planned 19th-century street grid to the south and southwest of the crossings. The town is the only significant built-up area within the Alyth Community Council boundaries, most of which is upland pasture and grouse moor or lowland arable land. Three golf courses occupy a significant area of land to the south and east of the town. Apart from the extension of the golf courses, land-use around Alyth has changed only marginally in the past 80 years.

=== Den of Alyth ===
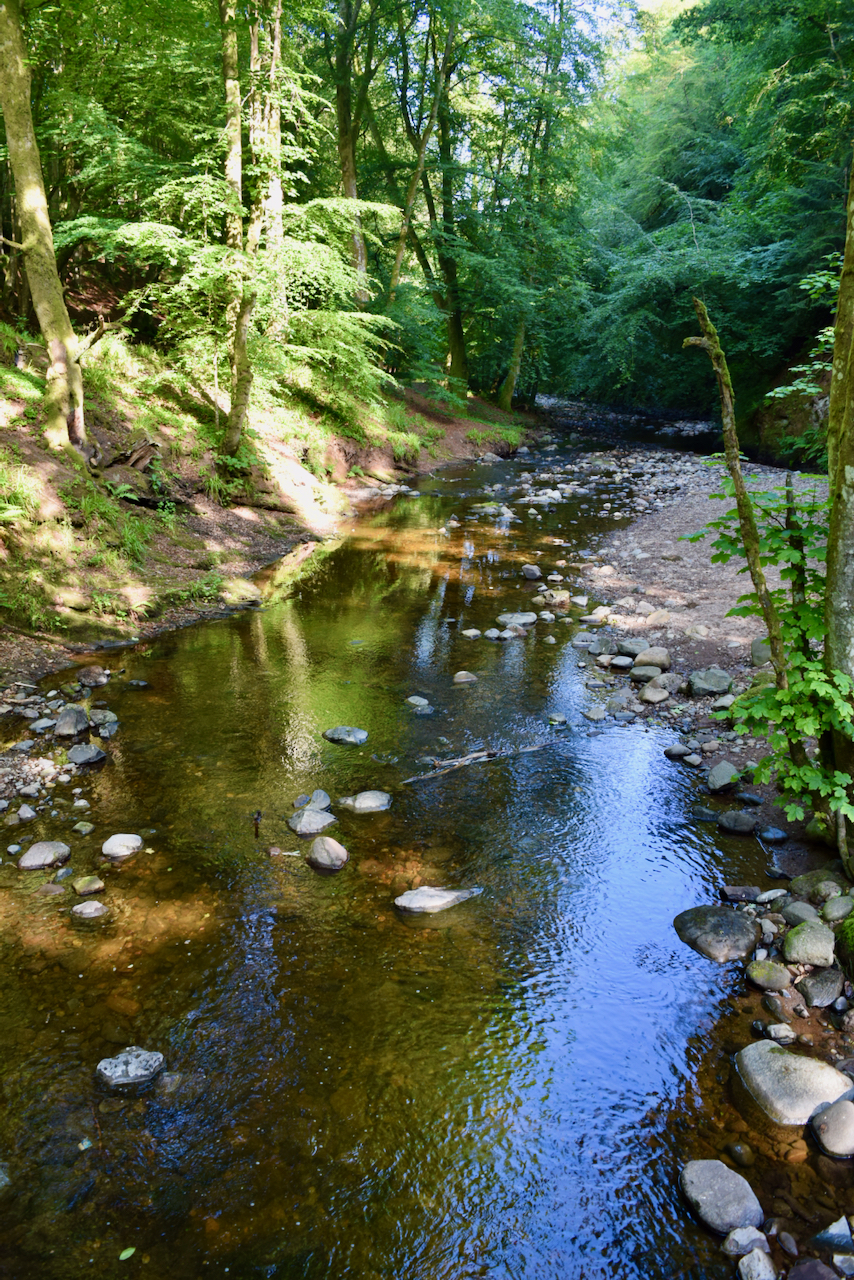
The Den of Alyth SSSI

The Den of Alyth is a two-mile-long (three-kilometre) wooded gorge lying on either side of the Alyth Burn northwest of the village. Just under 33 hectares (82 acres) of the Den are designated a Site of Special Scientific Interest (SSSI), important for its upland mixed ash woodland. It is also part of the River Tay Special Area of Conservation, designated for its importance to Atlantic Salmon, otter and various species of lamprey. Alyth Den includes a number of abandoned quarries which provided much of the stone for buildings within the town in earlier times. The Den was gifted to the town by the Earl of Airlie in 1923. Today it is a popular destination for walkers, cyclists and naturalists.

== Demography ==
According to Scotland's Census 2022, the population of the civil parish of Alyth was 3,046, split 48.8% male, 51.2% female. The age distribution of Alyth's population differs somewhat from Scotland, with 14.1% aged under 15 or under (Scotland 16.4%), 56.5% aged 16–64 (Scotland 63.6%), and 29.4% aged 65 or older (Scotland 20%).

Just over 98% of Alyth's population were white Scottish or other British in 2022, compared with just under 93% for Scotland overall. Economically active people aged over 16 made up 53.6% of the population (Scotland 56.8%), with 21.4% retired (Scotland 23.3%) and 1.4% unemployed (Scotland 7.6%) and 2% recorded as full-time students (Scotland 4%.

== Economy ==
Tourism accommodation, construction, retail, property, education and the motor trades are the main employment sectors, with smaller but still significant proportions in the arts, business admin and health. About 36% of the working population commute more than 5 km, with Dundee, Blairgowrie and Perth being the main destinations.

Alyth has slightly fewer jobs per head of population than similar towns and saw a small decline (-4%) in the number of jobs between 2009 and 2014. Just over 50% of the adult population are employees, just under 10% self-employed, and a little over 20% are retired. Over 70% of jobs are full-time, and almost 30% part-time.

Alyth has a more diverse retail sector and more people per shop than similar towns in Scotland, and also more tourist beds per head of population.

== Culture and community ==
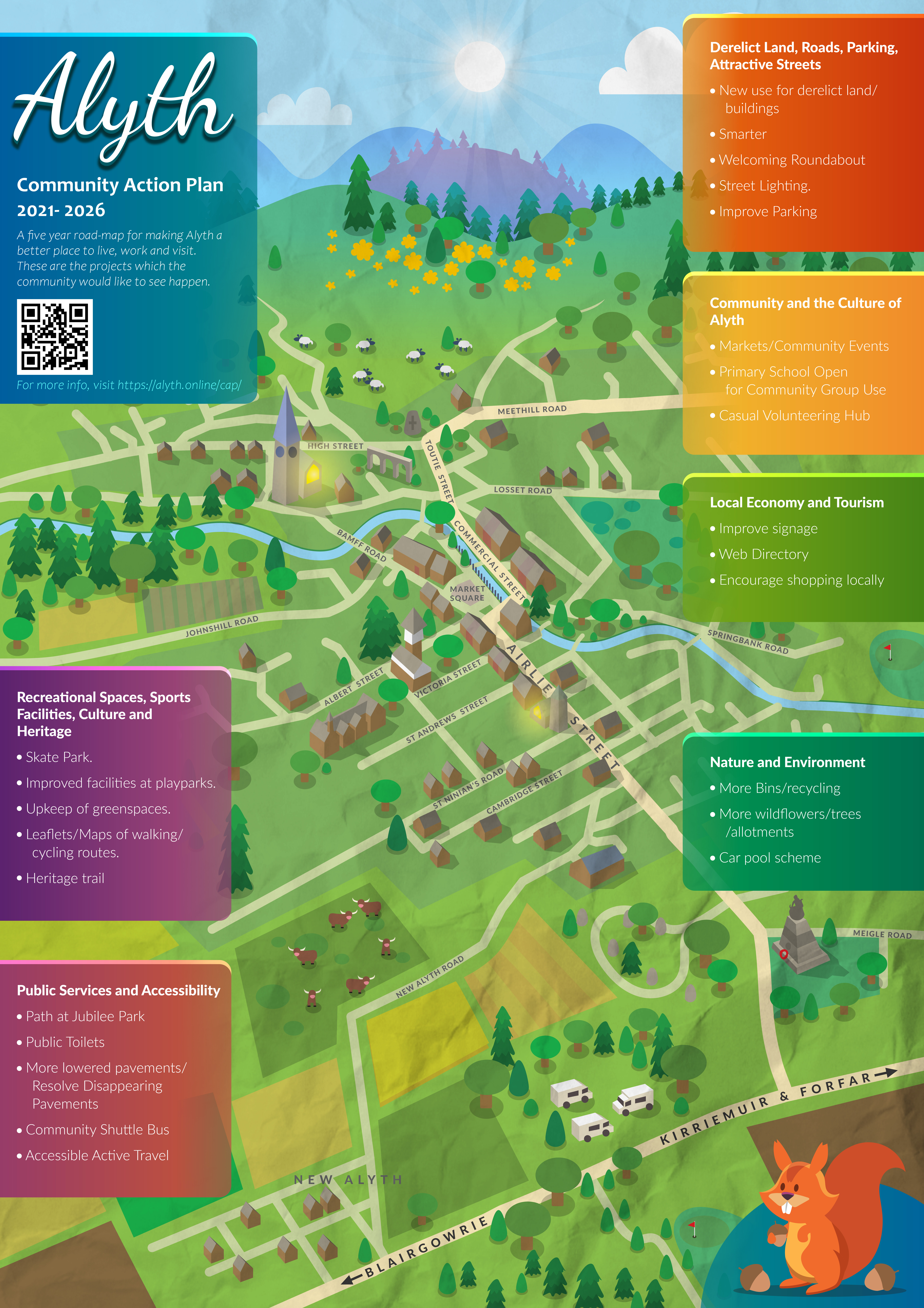
The five-year development aspirations of the community of Alyth, for 2021-2026

In 2021, Alyth Development Trust and other groups in the town carried out a major consultation on developing a Community Action Plan to identify and prioritise new initiatives that the people of the town wanted to see implemented. Several hundred responses were received and the results were collated into a five-year vision for the town, which was launched in March 2022

=== Culture ===
Alyth is part of the Cateran Ecomuseum, a new 'museum without walls' launched in 2019. Set across 1,000 square kilometres of eastern Perthshire and western Angus, all its sites are outside. It is Scotland's second ecomuseum and the only one on the mainland.

There is an active Alyth Family History Project, based at the Parish Church since 2009, which has assembled a large archive of photographs and genealogical records.

The Alyth & District Agricultural Show takes place annually each June.

"Alyth Creates" is the town's annual arts festival, run by Alyth Arts & Crafts Guild.

A golf club was established in Alyth in 1894. The original nine-hole course was designed by Old Tom Morris of St Andrews and was modified and extended to 18 holes by James Braid in 1934. Alyth Golf Club had its own halt on the Alyth railway branch line between 1861 and 1951. A further two golf clubs have opened since, the Strathmore Golf Centre (1986) with an 18- and a nine-hole course, and the 18-hole Glenisla Club in 1992. The Glenisla Club closed in 2016 with half the course being sold off for housing development and the other half being taken over by Alyth Golf Club to create a new nine-hole course alongside its existing 18-hole course.

The Alyth Voice is a free monthly community magazine produced and distributed by volunteers, launched in May 1997.

=== Community facilities ===
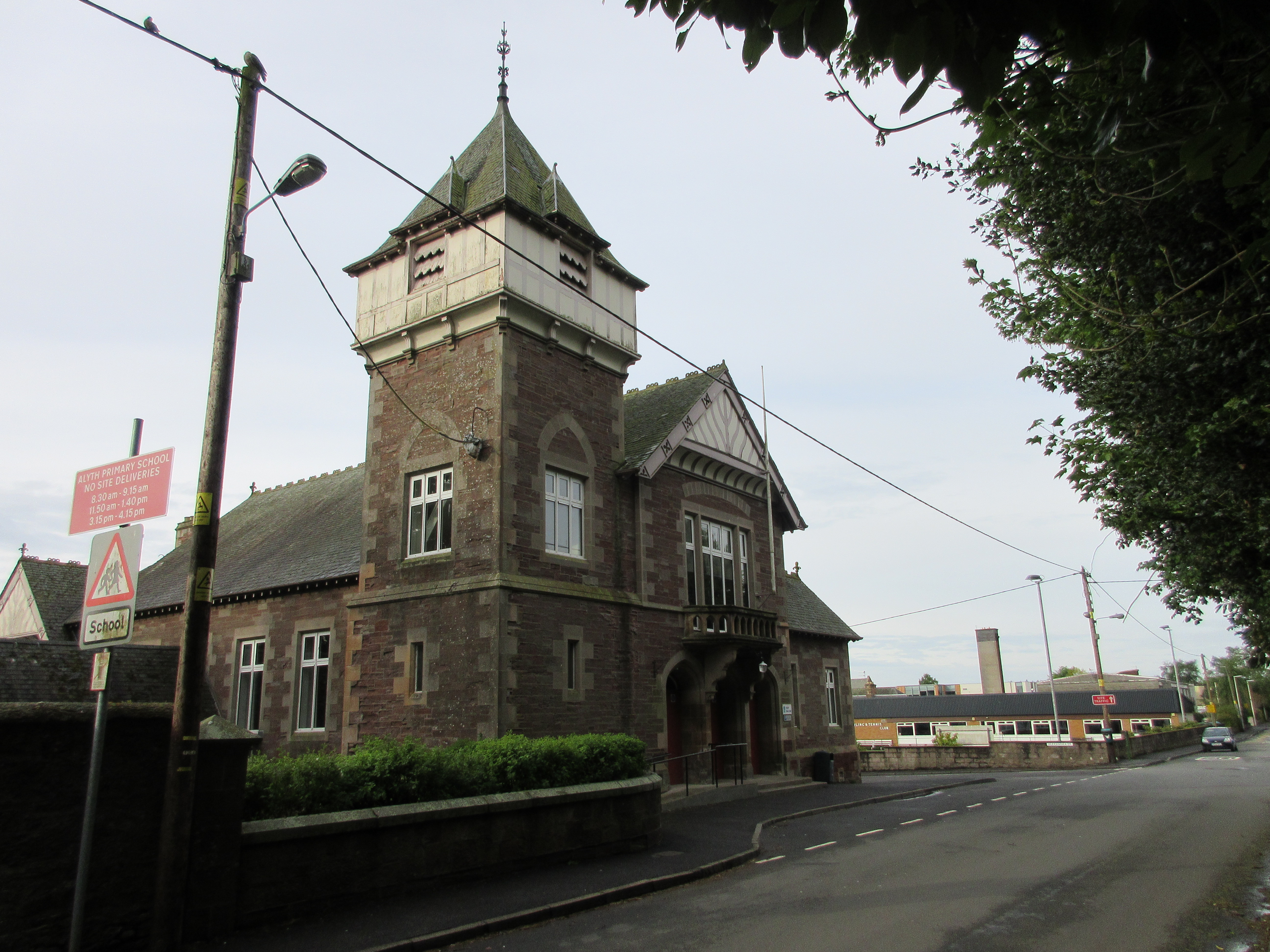
Alyth Town Hall

Alyth Town Hall is managed along with two other public halls in Alyth by the Alyth Halls Committee operating under a Constitution & Management Agreement with Perth & Kinross Council. The people of Alyth began raising money to build ‘a handsome town hall’ in 1884. The foundation stone was laid by the Earl of Airlie on 2 September 1886 and Alyth Town Hall opened on 29 April 1887. Designed by Andrew Heiton of Perth, The Hall is built from local redstone with white freestone at all the corners and windows.

Alyth has a public library, run by Perth & Kinross Council.

Health and medical services in Alyth are provided by NHS Scotland via Alyth Health Centre. There is also a dental practice operating as Infinityblu Dental Care.

The Diamond Jubilee Park, containing a recreation ground and children's play park, was gifted to the people of Alyth by the then Earl of Airlie to mark Queen Victoria's Diamond Jubilee in 1897. It includes a football pitch which is home to Alyth Amateur Football Club. The park is managed by Perth & Kinross Council. In 2022, a community initiative raised £60,000 to build a new 665-metre multi-user path around the Park. Nearby, on the bank of Alyth Burn, is Mill Street Park containing another play-park for young children.

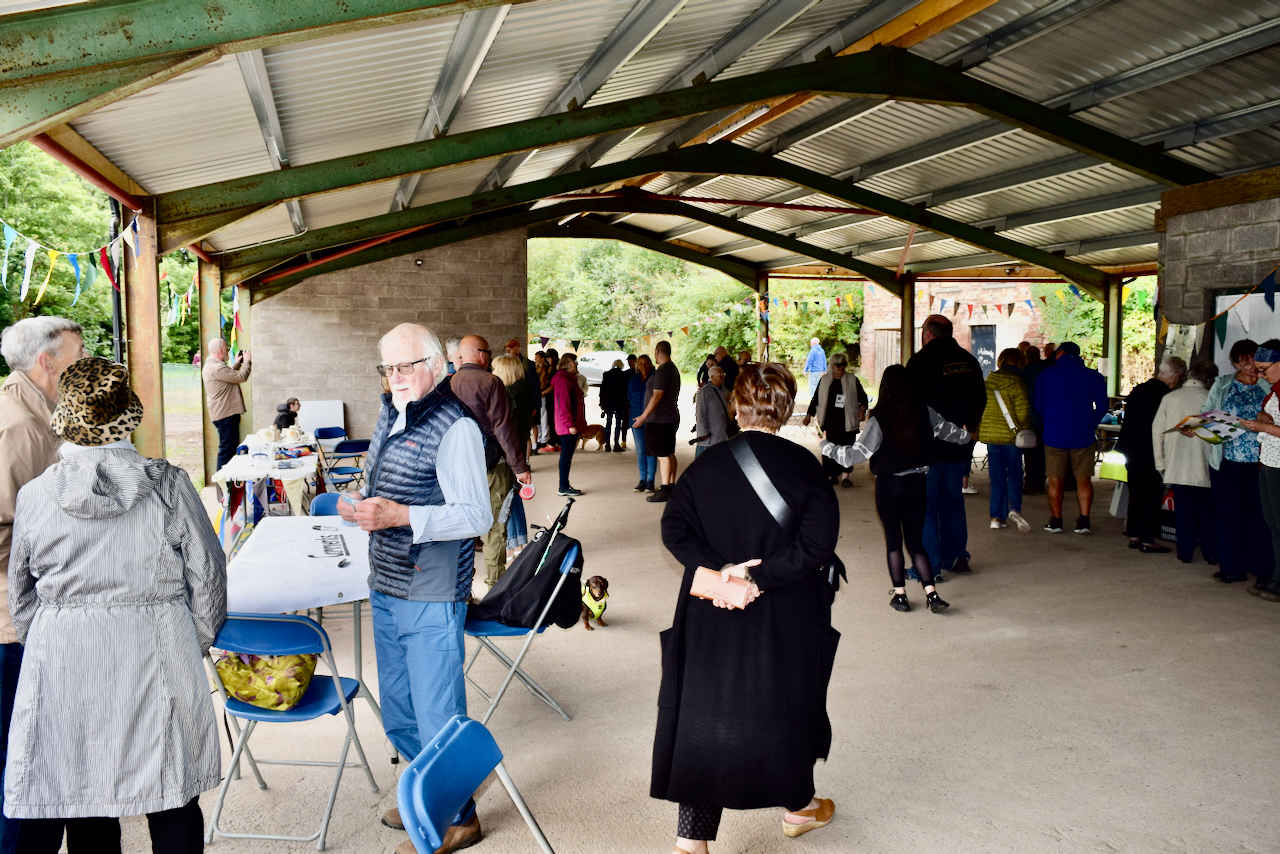
Open Day at the Millhaugh community event facility, August 2024

Millhaugh, a former sawmill and industrial site on the banks of the Alyth Burn, was acquired by Alyth Development Trust on behalf of the community in 2024 and converted into an outdoor space for community events.

There is an extensive network of 'core footpaths' in and around Alyth designated by Perth & Kinross Council, and maintained in large part by the Alyth Path Network – a group of volunteers dedicated to maintaining and promoting local country paths.

Alyth Hill is owned by the Scottish Government. It is mostly open to the public and managed by Forestry Scotland. An active voluntary group, the Alyth Hill Users' Group, represents the community's interests on the Hill, managing both the Community Orchard they established in 2011 and the Alyth Community Woodland established by the Forestry Commission in 2007.

Alyth has a handful of small public allotments scattered around the centre of the town, and in 2024 Alyth Development Trust supported a group of local volunteers to develop a large new allotment site on part of a former golf course to the east of the town.

=== Religion ===
Alyth has three churches: Alyth Parish Church (Church of Scotland), completed in 1839; St Ninian's Church (Scottish Episcopal Church), completed in 1856; and St Luan's Church (Catholic Church in Scotland).

== Landmarks ==
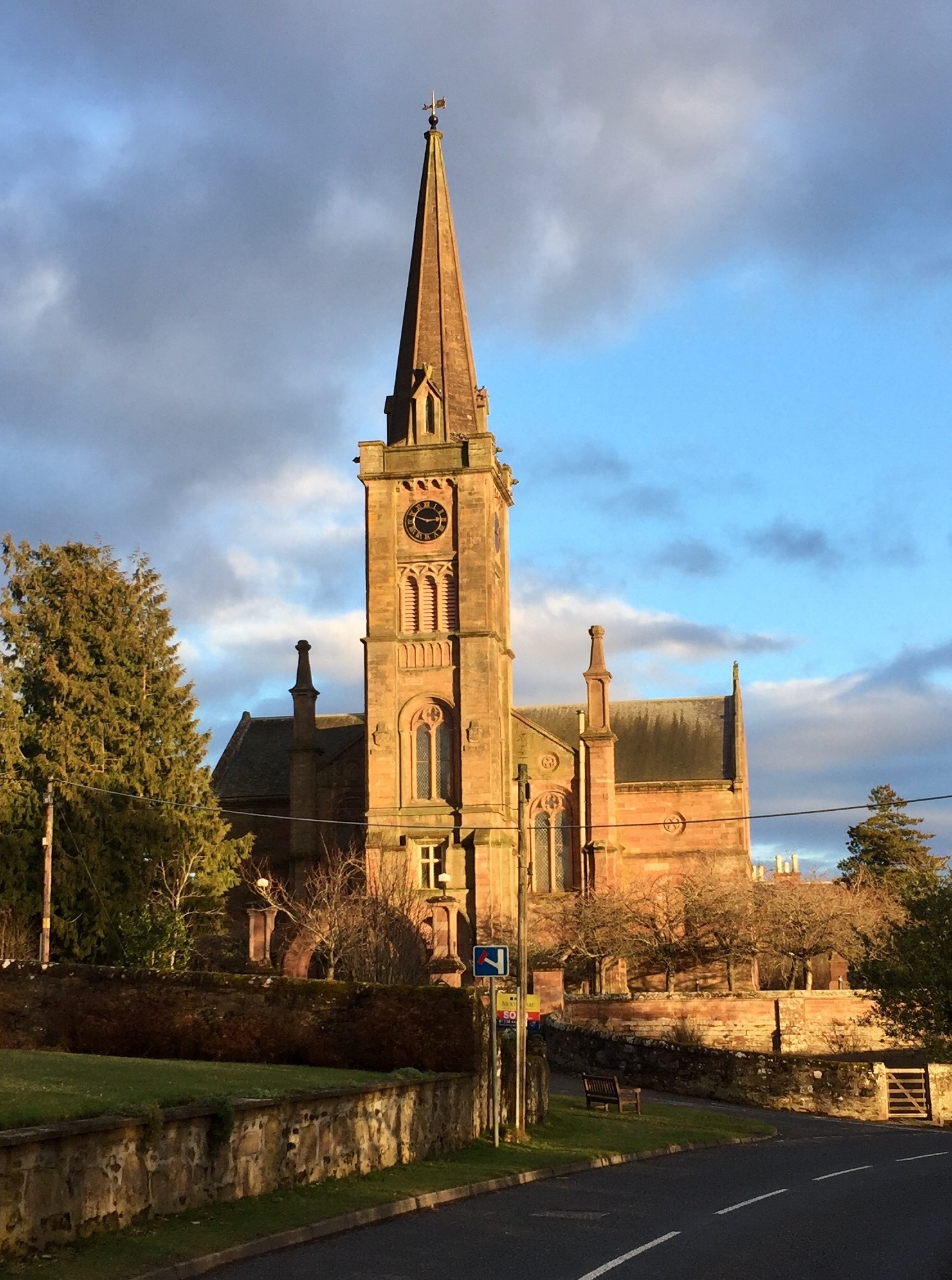
Alyth Parish Church viewed from the west

Alyth Parish Church (completed in 1839) is notable for its unusually high steeple, visible from many parts of the town and from the roads and fields surrounding it.

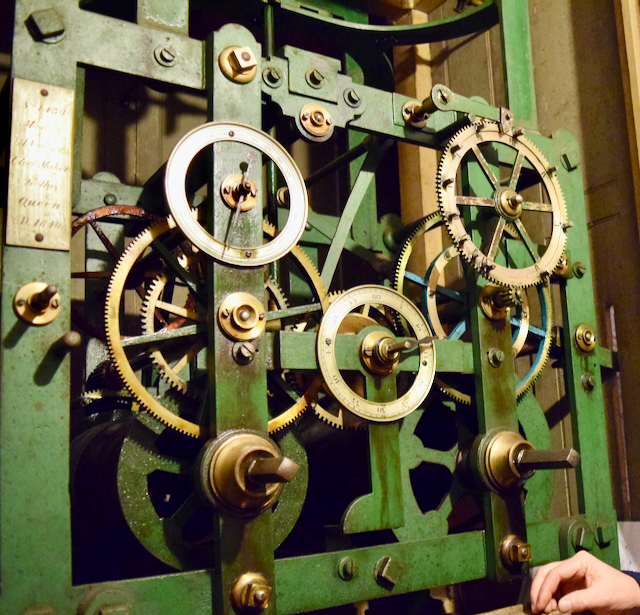
Mechanism of Alyth's Vulliamy clock

The Church houses a rare clock made by Benjamin Lewis Vulliamy, maker of clocks in many royal palaces and one of the leading horologists of the early 19th century. The Alyth clock, one of only two known Vulliamy clocks in Scotland, was installed in 1840 along with a bell cast at Thomas Mears' Whitechapel Foundry, where Big Ben was also cast.

The Alyth Arches (see History and Archaeology section above) are also a prominent landmark visible from the centre of the town. The grand Alyth Town Hall on Albert Street was built in 1887. Balhary House, two miles (three kilometres) south of Alyth, is a Grade A-listed late Georgian country house. The Hill of Alyth and Barry Hill dominate the town to the northwest and north.

There are several war memorials in the town: the main war memorial on the Market Muir at the southern end of Airlie Street commemorates 119 local men who died in World War I, together with 33 who died in World War II and one who died in the Falklands Campaign. Located beside this is the memorial to Alfred Anderson, who was the last surviving Scottish veteran of WW1, last survivor of the Christmas Truce of 1914, and Scotland's oldest man when he died in 2005. In the Market Square, there is a memorial to three local men who died in the Second Boer War. There are a number of other war memorials inside Alyth Parish Church, St Ninian's Church and other buildings in the town.

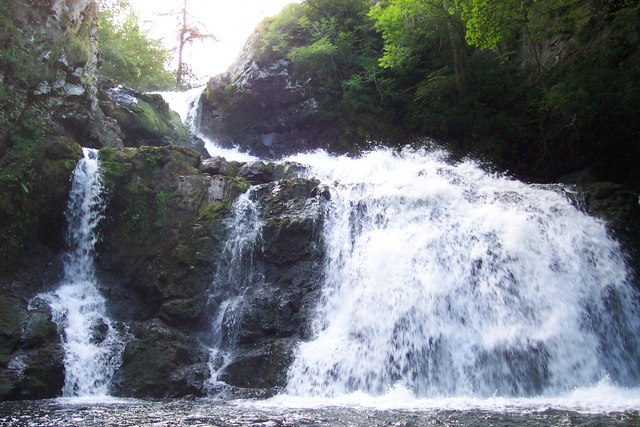
Reekie Linn waterfall near Alyth

Five miles (eight kilometres) north of Alyth, on the River Isla, is the spectacular waterfall of Reekie Linn, from the Gaelic for "misty pool". The River Isla has carved a 45-metre-deep gorge down from the hard igneous rock of the Highlands to the softer sandstone of Strathmore, creating two falls of 6 metres and 18 metres. When the River Isla is in spate the two falls merge to create a single drop of 24 metres. At the base of the waterfall is a dark cave called Black Dub, where legend has it an outlaw once hid until the devil appeared before him in the form of a giant black dog. The outlaw was so scared that he turned himself in the next day.

== Transport ==
=== Roads ===
Alyth lies just north of the junction of the A926 (connecting Blairgowrie and Kirriemuir) and the B954 (connecting Dundee and Glenisla). The B952 loops through the town itself, from the A925/B954 junction back to the B954 just east of the town.

=== Railway ===
Alyth was the terminus of the Alyth Railway, a branch from the Scottish Midland Junction Railway. Alyth railway station opened in 1861 and closed to passenger traffic in 1951, although goods traffic continued until 1965. The site of the former railway station, now occupied by housing, is remembered in the name Mart Street, where livestock auctions were held after they moved from the Market Muir. The nearest ScotRail stations nowadays are Dundee railway station and Perth railway station (Scotland).

=== Cycling ===
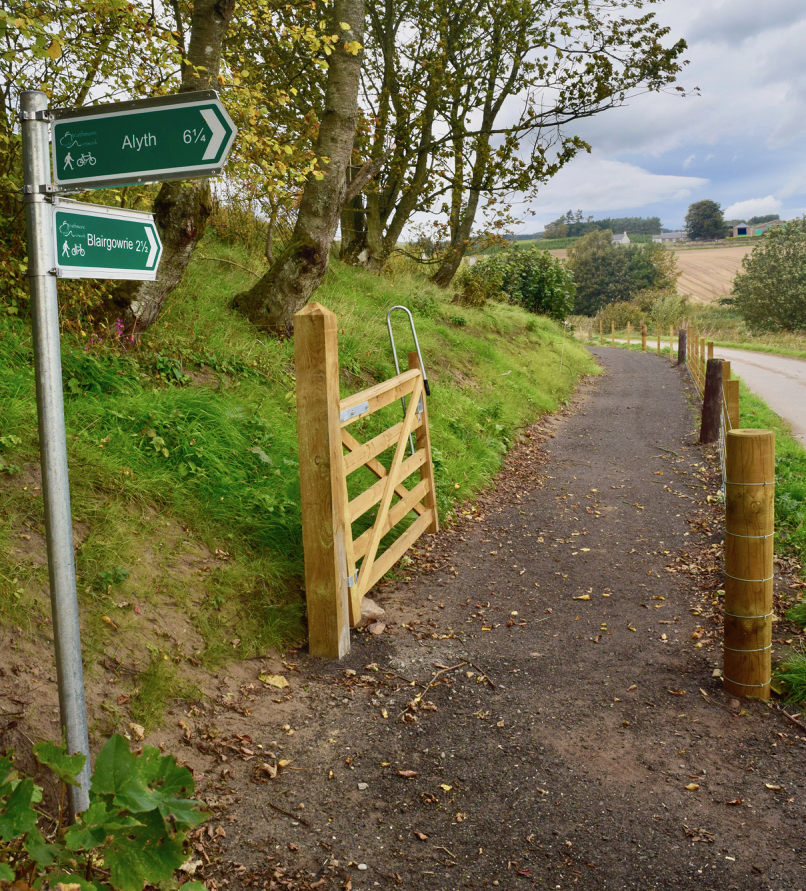
The Strathmore Cycle Network connects Alyth with Blairgowrie and Coupar Angus

Alyth is part of the Strathmore Cycle Network, a project to develop a series of dedicated cycle tracks connecting three local towns via country lanes and specially-built paths avoiding main roads.

=== Buses ===
Stagecoach East Scotland operate services 57 & 57A via Alyth to Dundee, Blairgowrie and Perth. They run hourly everyday by double decker buses. The vehicles on the Stagecoach routes have recently been upgraded with a £1,000,000 investment in new buses. JP Coaches also operate services in the area. Service 128 of theirs runs to Kirriemuir two-hourly between Monday and Saturday.

== Education ==
Alyth has a primary school with around 170 pupils. Alyth High School (built in 1885) catered for pupils up to fourth year until it was closed in 1994, when all pupils were moved to Blairgowrie High School or Webster's High School situated in nearby Kirriemuir. The Primary School was rebuilt and extended in 2018.

== Notable people ==
- Sir Francis Aglen (1869–1932), head of the Chinese Maritime Customs service from 1911 to 1927, which was one of the most important posts in the administration of China at that time, grew up in Alyth and returned to live in the town following his retirement
- Alfred Anderson, the last surviving Scottish veteran of WW1, last survivor of the Christmas Truce of 1914, and Scotland's oldest man when he died in 2005
- James Young Geddes, poet and one-time chairman of Alyth Town Council
- Professor John M. Mackenzie, the British historian of imperialism who pioneered the study of popular and cultural imperialism, as well as aspects of environmental history, lives in Alyth
- William Lyon Mackenzie (1795–1861), an important figure in Canadian history, lived and worked on Toutie Street in Alyth from 1814 to 1817. He then emigrated to Canada where he became a newspaper editor, radical, and politician
- Sir James Ramsay, 10th Baronet, historian and landowner
- David Smart, a prominent late 19th-century architect
- Andy Stewart, front man of the 1970s Scottish folk band, Silly Wizard, was born in Alyth
- Sheila Stewart late folk singer
- Dr William Warden, Royal Navy surgeon who caused a furore when his account of conversations with Napoleon Bonaparte in exile on St Helena were published in 1816

== See also ==
- List of listed buildings in Alyth, Perth and Kinross
- Meigle Sculptured Stone Museum
