= William Warden (Royal Navy officer) =

William Warden (1777–1849) was a British surgeon in the Royal Navy who published a popular account of his conversations with Napoleon Bonaparte.

Warden was born in Alyth in Forfarshire on 1 May 1777. After attending a local parish school, he was sent to Montrose and Edinburgh. In 1795, Warden entered the Royal Navy and was assigned as a surgeon's mate on the frigate Melpomene.

In 1797, Warden became involved in a sailor mutiny on several fleet ships that were anchored at the Nore in the Thames River. When the crew took over the Melpomene, they demanded that the ship surgeon be sent ashore with Warden taking his place. Warden refused their demand.

On 2 April 1801, Warden was promoted to ship surgeon on his new ship, the frigate HMS Alcmene, during the Battle of Copenhagen. On 10 August 1805, Warden was the ship surgeon on the frigate HMS Phoenix when it engaged the French frigate Didon off Cape Finisterre. Severely wounded in the battle, Warden was later evacuated to Greenwich Hospital in England for recuperation. Several years later, Warden served during the War of 1812.

In 1811, Warden received his doctorate from St. Andrews University.

In 1815, Warden was assigned to the ship of the line HMS Northumberland as it transported Bonaparte to his exile on St. Helena Island. During the voyage and for several months later on the island, Warden had extensive conversations through a translator with Bonaparte. Warden later sent a journal of these conversations to London for publication in 1816.

The publication of Warden's Letters caused a furor in England. Critics claimed that the book was ghostwritten and was historically inaccurate. The Admiralty treated Warden book as a breach of discipline and removed him from the list of ship surgeons in the fleet. However, he was later reassigned to the hospital ship Argonaut.

In 1824, Warden received a second medical degree from Edinburgh University. In 1825, he was appointed surgeon of the navy dockyard at Sheerness in Kent. In 1842, Warden was transferred to the Chatham Dockyard in Kent.

Warden died in Chatham on 23 April 1849, still in the Royal Navy.

== Works ==
- Letters written on board His Majesty's ship the Northumberland, and at St. Helena: in which the conduct and conversation of Napoleon Buonaparte, and his suite, during the voyage, and the first months of his residence in that island, are faithfully described and related (3rd ed.), Published for the author, by R. Ackermann, 1816
