= Pack Bridge =

Bridge at Alyth, Scotland

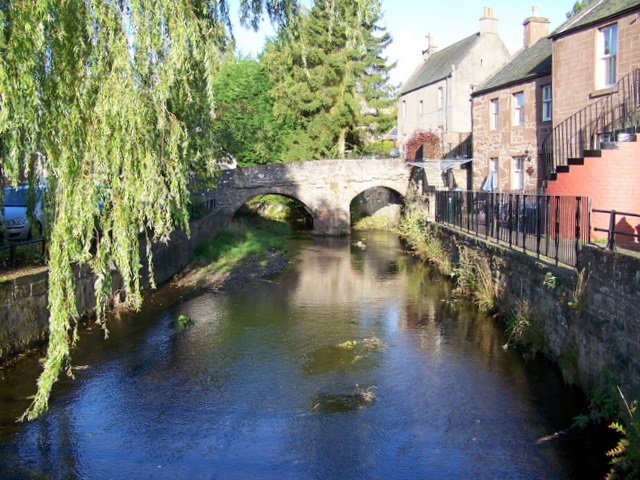
- The bridge in 2009, looking northwest
- Coordinates: 56.624064257°N 3.231814732°W
- Crosses: Alyth Burn
- Locale: Perth and Kinross

Characteristics
- Width: 5 feet (1.5 m)

History
- Opened: c. 1500 (526 years ago)

Listed Building – Category B
- Official name: Old Packbridge Over Alyth Burn
- Designated: 4 October 1971
- Reference no.: LB21050

Location
- Interactive map of Pack Bridge

Pack Bridge is a bridge in the Scottish town of Alyth, Perth and Kinross. Intended to carry packhorses loaded with panniers across Alyth Burn, it is one of the oldest masonry bridges in Scotland and is shown on maps as far back as 1600, but is believed to date to the early 16th century. The bridge was rebuilt in 1674 and increased in height with its wide parapets in the 19th century, but retained its original 5 foot (1.5 m) width. Today, the bridge carries pedestrian traffic between Pitnacree Street and Chapel Street.

== See also ==
- List of bridges in Scotland
