= Farnell Castle =

- Farnell, Angus, Scotland

Location
- Location within Angus
- Coordinates: 56.6896°N 2.6150°W

Farnell Castle is an oblong tower house dating from the late 16th century four miles south of Brechin, Angus, Scotland.

== History ==
The present castle replaces a previous castle on the site, in existence in 1296. King Edward I of England stayed one night in 1296 at the castle during his invasion of Scotland, before travelling to Brechin Castle.

The castle originated as the Bishop's palace of the Bishop of Brechin. Bishop Meldrum called it 'Palatium Nostrum' in 1512. It was disposed of in about 1566, supposedly by Donald Campbell. It was turned into a secular castle by Catherine, Countess of Crawford. Subsequently, the Earl of Southesk purchased the castle. It was an alms house in the 19th century.

== Structure ==
The castle is a three-storey structure, built from rubble and slate.

The east section, which was the bishop's residence, has crow-stepped gables. On the north are a projecting garderobe, with sanitary flues. On the east gable, at the level of the floors, there is a double row of corbels, and corbels which appear to have been for the purpose of supporting a roofed gallery. On the northern skewpots are small carved shields. One has the initial M, and a crown above; the other I.M., thought to stand for 'Jesu Maria' There is a circular stair tower in front.

It is a category A listed building.

There is ruined rectangular lean-to dovecot with rubble walls supported by later buttressing in the castle grounds.
