= Carnegie Castle =

Castle in Angus, Scotland

Location
- Coordinates: 56.5624290°N 2.7580310°W

Site history
- Built: 16th century

Carnegie Castle was a castle that was located in Angus, Scotland. The Carnegies owned the property between the 15th-18th century. The site of the castle is now farmland. No remains above ground are visible.
