= Thomas de Morham =

Sir Thomas de Morham
- Died: Tower of London, England
- Occupation: Noble
- Known for: Patriot of the Scottish cause during the First War of Scottish Independence, imprisoned in the Tower of London
- Children: Hubert, Thomas

Arms of Thomas de Morham: Argent, on a fess sable, three sextifoils or.

Sir Thomas de Morham, Lord of Morham, was a 13th-14th century Scottish noble. Morham was a noted patriot during the First War of Scottish Independence and was held a prisoner of the English in the Tower of London for 17 years.

== Biography ==
Morham was the son of Adam Malherbe of Morham. He is first mentioned in a charter to Newbattle Abbey in circa 1280.

Thomas was at the battle of Dunbar on 27 April 1296, in which his sons Hubert and Thomas were captured. He was able to escape and was later captured by Hugh de St John and presented to King Edward I of England at Aberdeen in July. Held initially at Berwick he was then sent to the Tower of London, where he remained a prisoner for 17 years. Morham was released by King Edward II of England on 13 November 1314 in a prisoner exchange for John Segrave, 2nd Baron Segrave. After his release Thomas resigned the Barony of Kimmerghame to Alexander Stewart in a charter of King Robert I of Scotland of 1316. He was one of the sealers of the Declaration of Arbroath in 1320.

Morham was last mentioned in a charter of 1322, in which he granted the Baronies of Morham and Duncanlaw to John Giffard and Euphemia Morham. His son Thomas died c.1322 and his other son Hubert was executed on 7 September 1306.
