= Kinclaven Castle =

Ruined 13th-century castle in Perthshire, Scotland

- Perth and Kinross, Scotland

Site information
- Open to the public: Unknown
- Condition: Ruin

Location
- Location within Perth and Kinross
- Coordinates: 56.524081°N 3.370005°W

Kinclaven Castle is a ruined 13th century castle in Perthshire, Scotland.

== History ==
Built at the confluence of the Isla and Tay rivers, the castle originally controlled the ferry crossing nearby. The castle was used as a royal castle by King Alexander II of Scotland and a number of charters were signed during the reign of King Alexander III of Scotland (r.1249–1286).

Kinclaven was in English hands in 1296, King Edward I of England staying one night at the castle during his invasion of Scotland. Kinclaven was later captured by William Wallace in 1297. Wallace sacked the castle and put the English garrison and constable James Butler to the sword.

After being repaired, the castle was again in English hands by 1337, when the Guardian of Scotland Sir Andrew Murray retook the castle.
