= Ardestie Castle =

Coordinates: 56.4924°N 2.8025°W

Ardestie Castle was a late 15th-century L-plan tower house-style castle in Monikie, Angus, Scotland and was roughly 4.5 miles (7.2 km) north of Monifieth. Only partial remains of the castle's foundations survive.

== History ==
In the late 17th century, the Earls of Panmure resided in the castle until the completion of Panmure House. James Maule, the 4th and last Earl of Panmure, was born at the castle in 1658.

In 1853, the foundations of the castle were still visible, but not much remains now.

Much of the stone from the castle was used to build local farm buildings.

== Structure ==
Ardestie Castle is thought to have been similar in style to Auchinleck Castle (Affleck Castle) and Hynd Castle, although apparently much larger.

== See also ==
- Castles in Great Britain and Ireland
- List of castles in Scotland
