= James Young Geddes =

Scottish poet

James Young Geddes (1850 – 1913) was a Scottish poet. Born in Dundee, he spent much of his youth and later life in Alyth, where he worked as a local correspondent for the Dundee Advertiser. He later served as chairman of Alyth Town Council. In the 1880s, he was president of Dundee Burns Club.

== Collections ==
- The New Jerusalem (1879)
- The Spectre Clock of Alyth (1886)
- To the Valhalla (1891)
