= Folda, Angus =

Hamlet in Angus, Scotland

Coordinates: 56.763197°N 3.329872°W

Folda
- Location within Angus
- OS grid reference: NO188643
- Council area: Angus
- Lieutenancy area: Angus
- Country: Scotland
- Sovereign state: United Kingdom
- Post town: BLAIRGOWRIE
- Postcode district: PH11
- Dialling code: 01575
- Police: Scotland
- Fire: Scottish
- Ambulance: Scottish
- UK Parliament: Angus
- Scottish Parliament: North Tayside; North East Scotland

Folda is a hamlet in Glen Isla, Angus, Scotland. It is situated on the River Isla, twelve miles north-west of Kirriemuir and eleven miles north of Blairgowrie, on the B951 road.

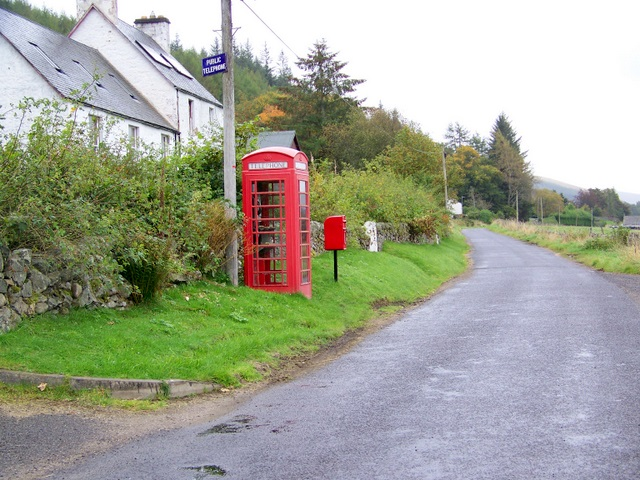
Folda
