= Montrose Castle =

Castle in Angus, Scotland

Coordinates: 56.708°N 2.474°W

Montrose Castle was a 12th-century castle built in Montrose, Angus, Scotland. Montrose was created a royal burgh by King David I of Scotland in the 12th century. The castle, once a royal castle, was built as a motte and bailey castle. King Edward I of England accepted John Balliol's surrender of Scotland at the castle on 10 July 1296. The castle was destroyed by William Wallace in 1297. The castle was noted to be in ruins in 1488. Nothing now remains above ground.
