= Kinnaird Castle, Kinnaird =

Scottish castle

Kinnaird Castle
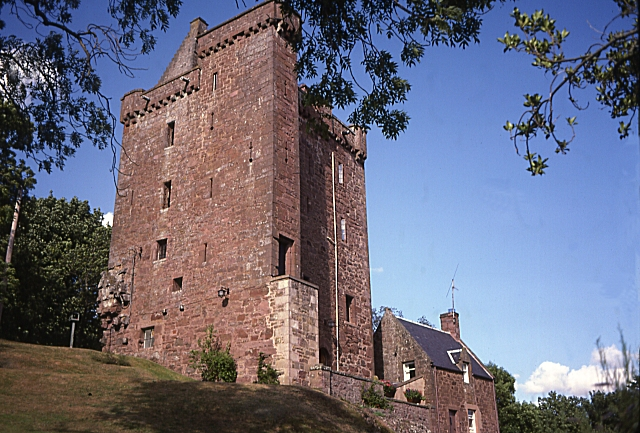

Site information
- Owner: Threipland family
- Condition: restored

Location
- Coordinates: 56.446187°N 3.232391°W

Kinnaird Castle is a 15th-century keep 9 miles (14 km) east and north of Perth, Perth and Kinross, Scotland.

== History ==
The Kinnaird family, descendants of Randolph Rufus who had a dwelling here about 1170, owned the castle. They built a castle, of which there is little or no trace, in the 13th century. The Colville family acquired the property.

The Earl of Angus besieged and sacked the castle in 1449 after Sir Robert Colville killed John Auchinleck. James VI hunted at Kinnaird in 1617, during his sole visit to Scotland after the 1603 Union of the Crowns.

The Threipland family purchased the castle in 1674. After being abandoned and becoming ruinous it was restored in 1855, and the Threiplands have reoccupied it.

== Architecture ==
Kinnaird Castle has four storeys, and a garret, surrounded by a parapet, with machicolated projections. The garret is gabled. There is a partly-gabled basement, with corbels supporting the central part of the floor. A dungeon has been excavated from the buttress masonry, and there is a dungeon carved from the rock.

The keep is oblong, but a small tower projects at the south west angle. There was formerly an outer bailey to the west. Two entrances give access to the keep from the south. An iron yett protects one at the basement level; the other is in the small tower, accessed by a stone forestair. It is believed that this door would have allowed entrance to a parapet walk around the courtyard.

There is a small two-storey building, dated 1610, to the east of the tower.

== See also ==
- Castles in Great Britain and Ireland
- List of castles in Scotland
