= Inverquiech Castle =

- Inverquiech, Perth and Kinross, Scotland

Site information
- Open to the public: Unknown
- Condition: Ruin

Location
- Location within Perth and Kinross
- Coordinates: 56.632763°N 3.178635°W

Inverquiech Castle is a ruined 13th-century castle near Inverquiech, Perth and Kinross, Scotland.

== History ==
Built at the confluence of the Quiech Burn and the River Isla. Inverquiech was a royal castle, with Alexander II of Scotland signing a charter here in 1244. Edward I of England stayed one night at the castle during his invasion of Scotland in 1296, before travelling to Forfar. The castle was in the hands of the Lindsay family in the 14th century.
