= Loch Mhic 'Ille Riabhaich =

Loch Mhic' Ille Riabhaich
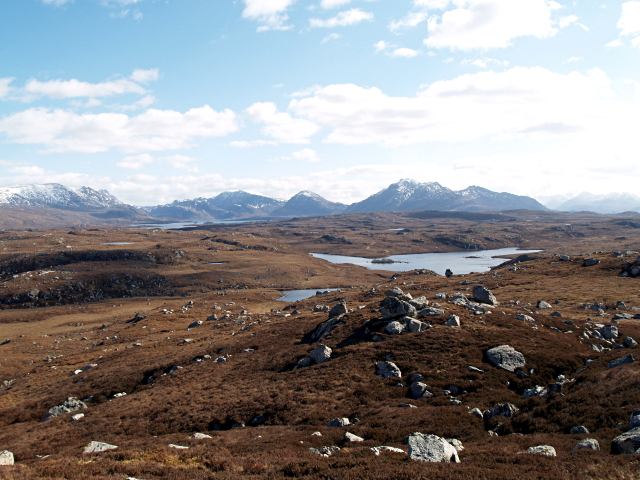
- Loch Mhic 'Ille Riabhaich from Carn Bad na h-Achlaise With a glimpse of Fionn Loch in the distance and its surrounding heights.

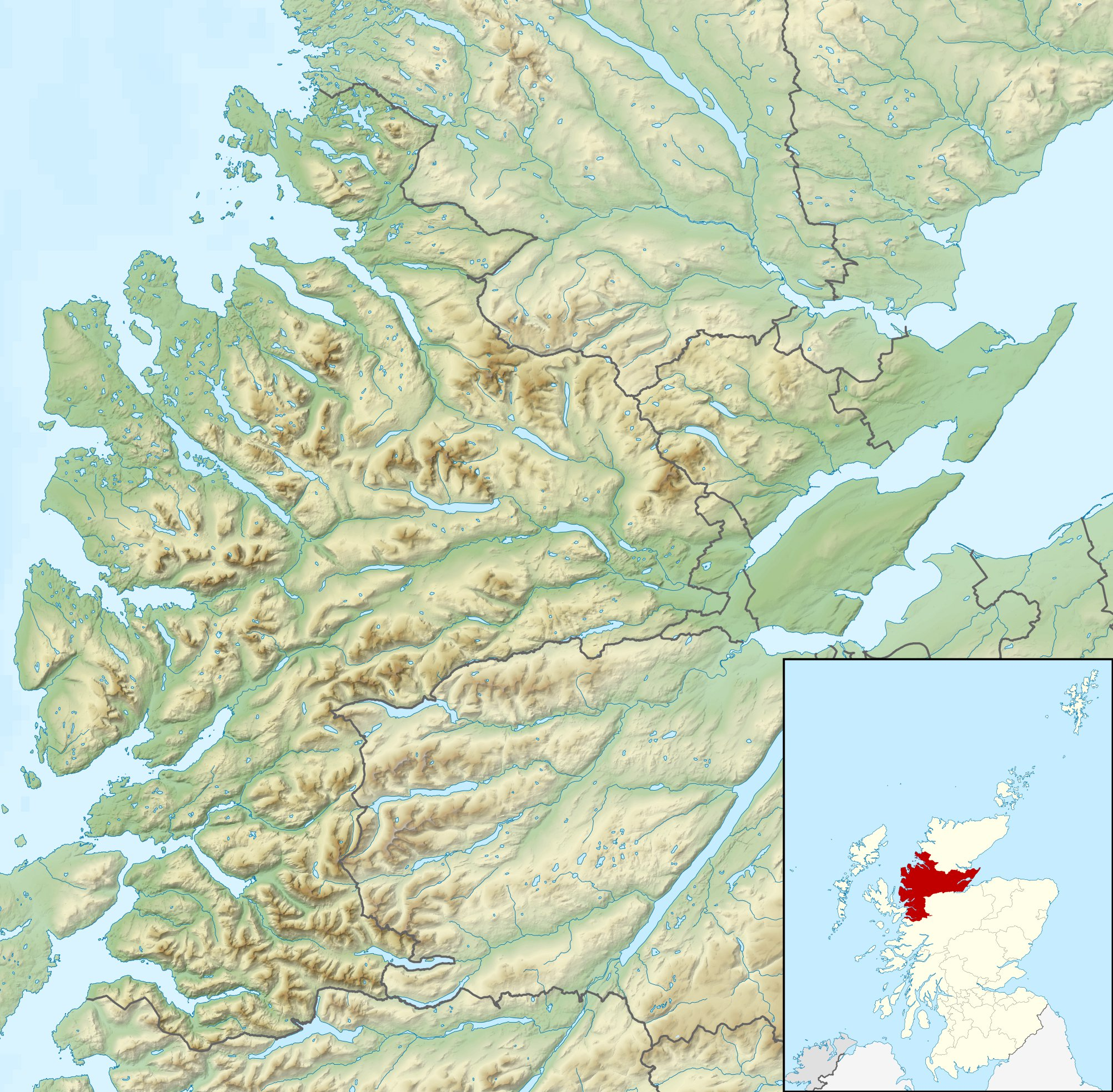
- Location in Wester Ross
- Location: NG90568440
- Coordinates: 57.8004°N 5.5259°W
- Type: freshwater loch
- Basin countries: Scotland
- Max. length: 0.74 km (0.46 mi)
- Max. width: 0.56 km (0.35 mi)
- Surface area: 14 ha (35 acres)
- Average depth: 10 ft (3.0 m)
- Max. depth: 17.7 ft (5.4 m)
- Water volume: 27,670,524.6 ft^{3} (783,542.00 m^{3})
- Shore length^{1}: 3 km (1.9 mi)
- Surface elevation: 157 m (515 ft)
- Max. temperature: 57.0 °F (13.9 °C)
- Islands: 2
- ^{1} Shore length is not a well-defined measure.

Loch Mhic 'ille Riabhaich (Scottish Gaelic pronunciation: [ˈɫox ṽɪç ˈiʎə ˈɾi͡əvɪç]; Loch of the Son of the Brindled Lad) is a small irregular shaped shallow freshwater loch that lies south-east of Loch a' Bhaid-luachraich and is located directly south of Aultbea in Wester Ross.

== Features ==
Loch Mhic' Ille Riabhaic has two small islands. The north-east island is a former Crannog that was built between 550 BC to 560 AD during the Iron Age. The renowned warrior Mac Gille Riabhaich would take refuge there in times of war. Close to the north end of the loch is a small cave known as Uamh Mhic 'ille Rhiabhaich (Cave of Mac Gille Riabhaich).

== Geography ==
Loch Mhic' Ille Riabhaich is surrounded by low peatland covered plain that is filled with small round hillocks and lochans and lochs. Loch Mhic' Ille Riabhaich drains into Loch a' Bhaid-luachraich along the Uidh Mhic 'Ille Riabhaich stream that in turn drains into Loch Ewe. Directly north is Loch Fada, directly south-east is Fionn Loch. To the south is Loch Kernsary. To the west is Loch a' Bhaid-luachraich.

== Gallery ==
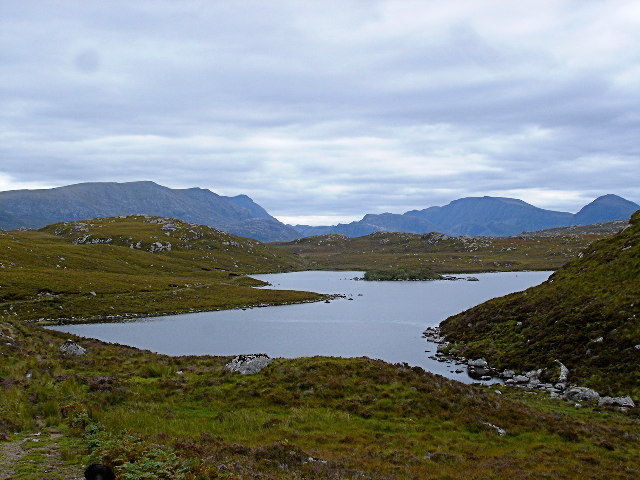
Loch Mhic'ille Riabhaich. Looking South-East across the loch. This one drains into Loch a' Bhaid-luachraich.

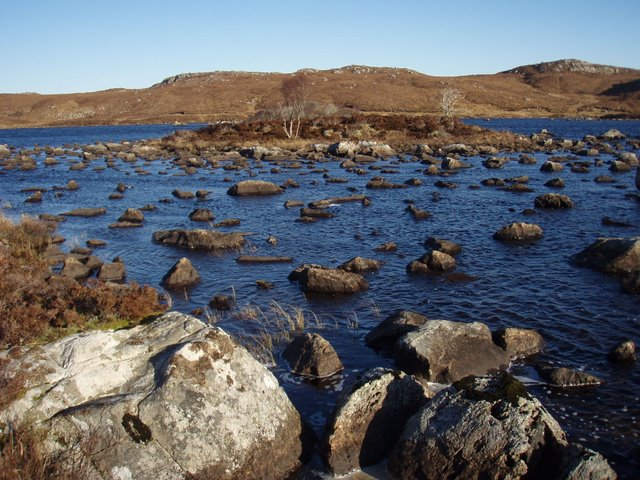
Small islet on Loch Mhic'ille Riabhaich One of the islands on the loch is supposed to be a crannog. Supposedly a refuge of Mac Gille Riabaich a notorious freebooter and renowned warrior.
