= Fionn (disambiguation) =

Fionn is a given name of Irish origin. It may also refer to:

== Scottish geography ==
- Fionn Bheinn, a mountain
- Fionn Loch (Fisherfield Forest, Wester Ross)
- Fionn Loch (Suilven)

== Other uses ==
- Fionn (band), a Canadian musical group consisting of identical twins Alanna and Brianne Finn-Morris
