= Lochan Fada, Letterewe =

Lochan Fada
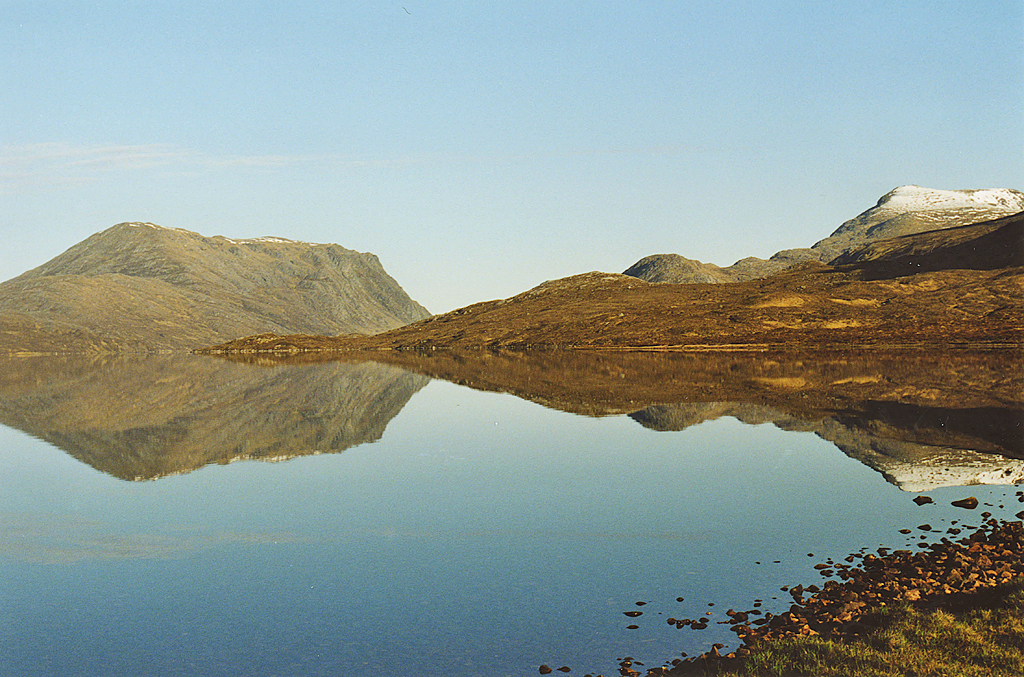
- Lochan Fada in early morning. Beinn Lair on the left and A'Mhaighdean on the right.

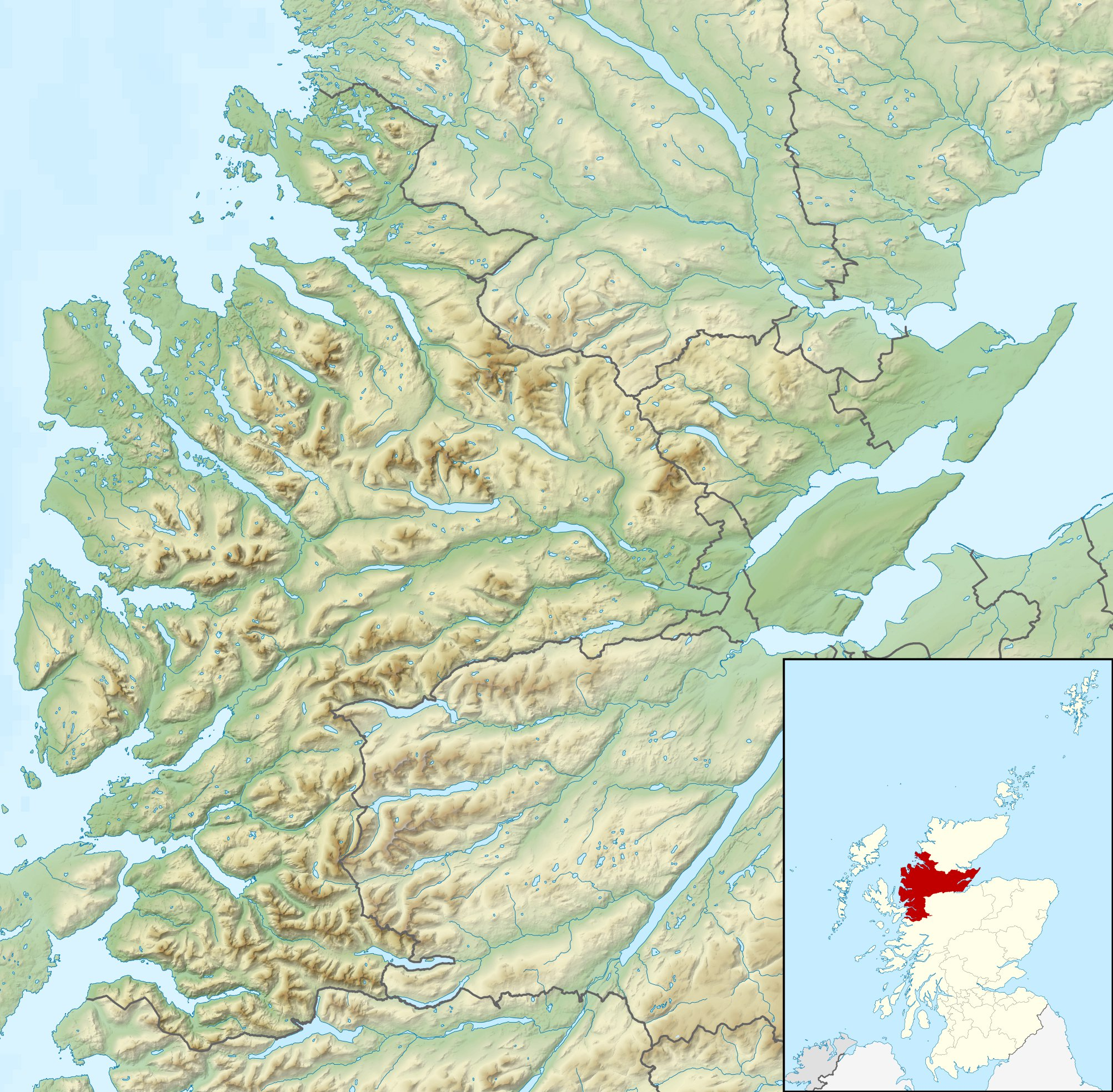
- Location in Wester Ross
- Location: NH02617109
- Coordinates: 57.6883°N 5.3225°W
- Type: freshwater loch
- Basin countries: Scotland
- Max. length: 5.8 km (3.6 mi)
- Max. width: 0.9 km (0.56 mi)
- Surface area: 377 ha (930 acres)
- Average depth: 102.5 ft (31.2 m)
- Max. depth: 248 ft (76 m)
- Water volume: 4,153,363,991 ft^{3} (117,610,171.0 m^{3})
- Shore length^{1}: 15 km (9.3 mi)
- Surface elevation: 311 m (1,020 ft)
- Max. temperature: 51.5 °F (10.8 °C)
- Min. temperature: 44.1 °F (6.7 °C)
- ^{1} Shore length is not a well-defined measure.

Lochan Fada (The long loch) is a large remote and deep freshwater loch that is located three miles north-east of Loch Maree in Wester Ross in the Northwest Highlands of Scotland.

== Geography ==
Lochan Fada lies almost directly north of Loch Maree running in a parallel direction, separated by a boggy plateau that runs the length of Loch Maree and constitutes the majority of Letterewe Forest. The plateau is bounded by Slioch, one of Scotland's Munros, known as "The Spear" at 981 metres (3218 feet) that dominates the south-eastern end. In the middle of the plateau is Beinn Lair at (859 m) with several smaller peaks at the north-western end with the highest being Beinn Airigh Charr at 792 m. Within the ridge is small remote Loch Garbhaig that lies below the northern cliffs of Slioch.

A vast number of lochs and lochans surround Lochan Fada. To the north-west lies the largest at Fionn Loch in Fisherfield Forest. The area directly north of the loch contains a large number of very small lochans grouped around the mountain Ruadh Stac Mor at 919 metres (3,015 ft). To the north-east lies Loch a' Bhraoin. Lochan Fada is drained by "Abhainn an Fhasaig", which has carved a steep, rocky gorge known as Gleann Bianasdail, through a waterfall eventually reaching Loch Maree.

== Gallery ==
Images of Lochan Fada

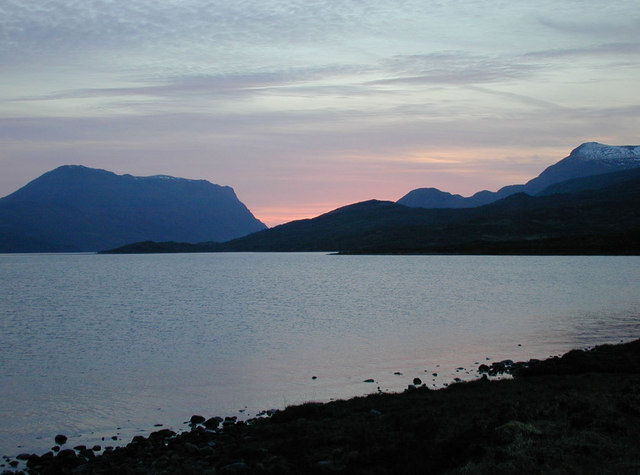
Lochan Fada at sunset. In the distance are Beinn Lair on the left and A' Mhaighdean on the right.

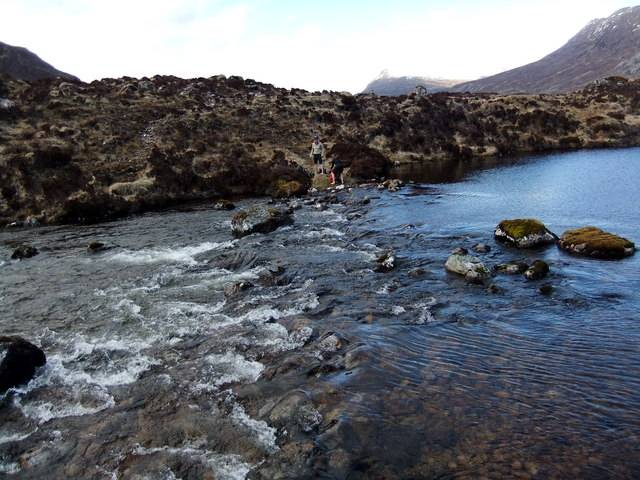
Outflow from the loch

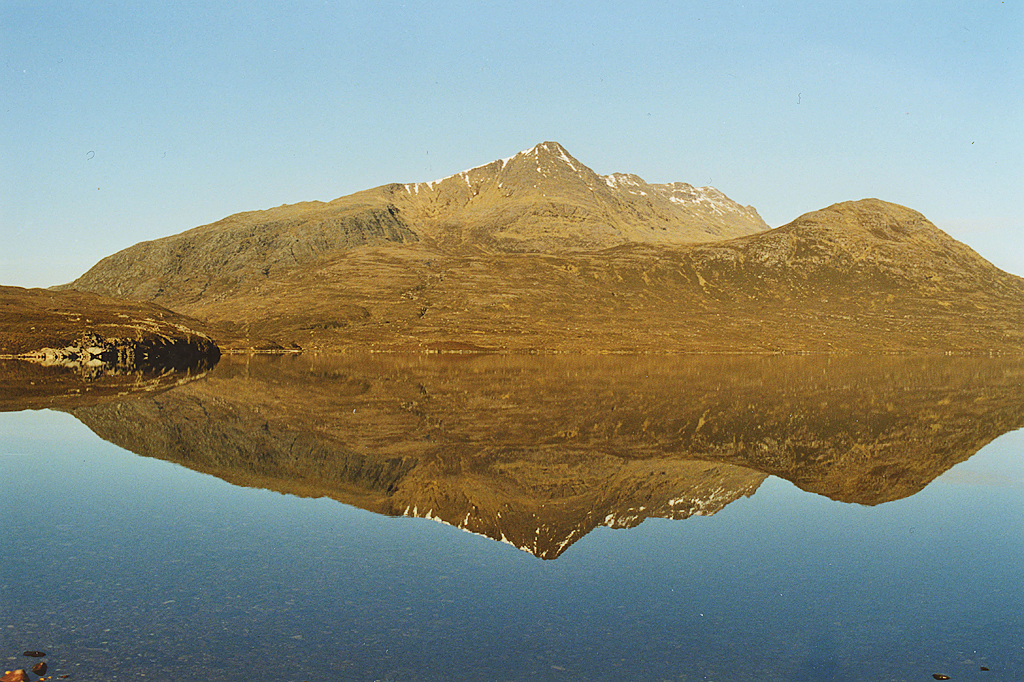
Early morning on Lochan Fada.

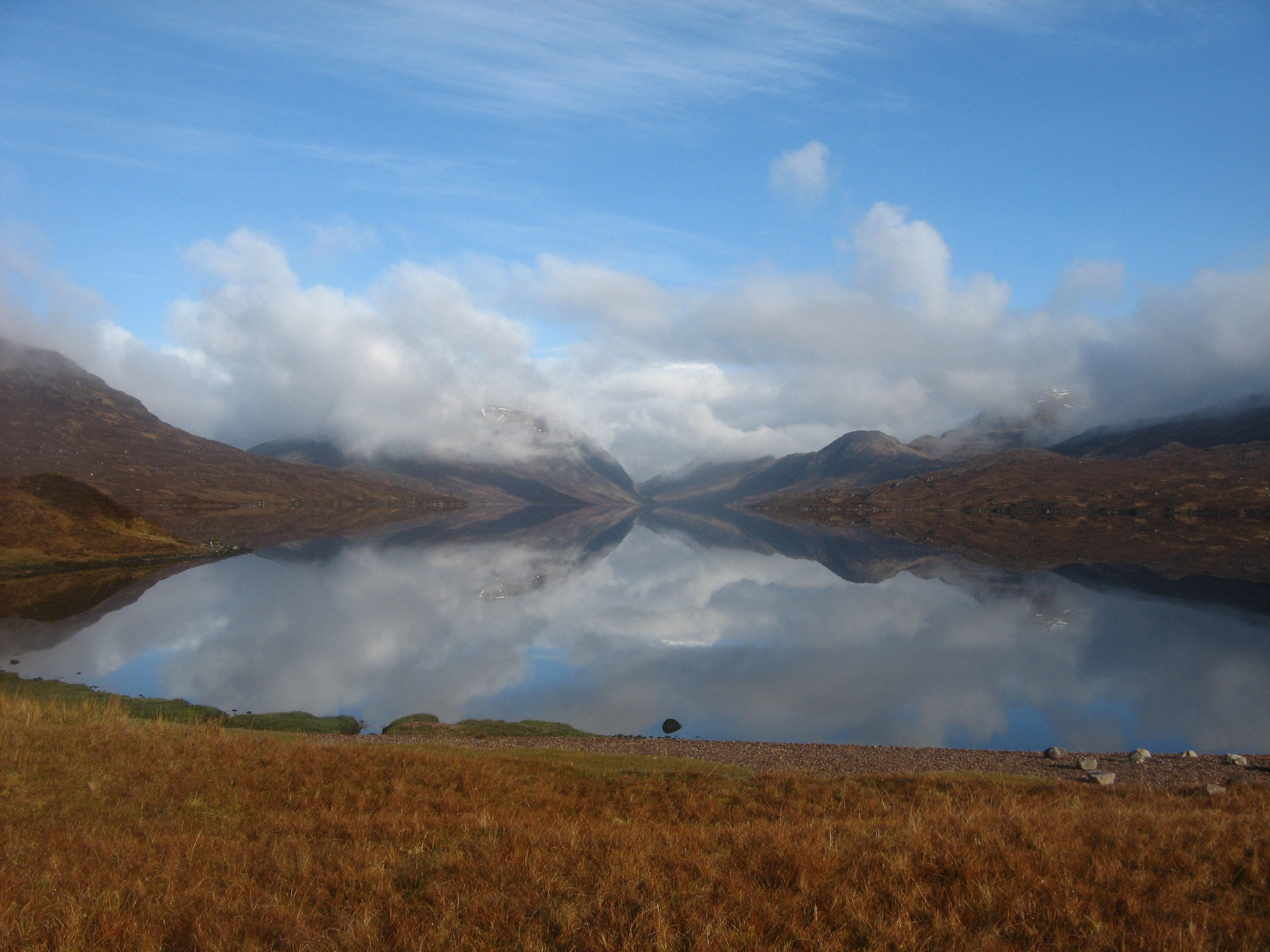
Lochan Fada at the south-eastern shore

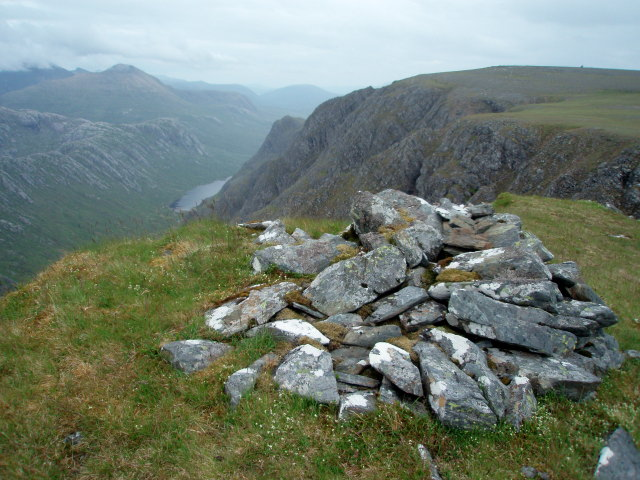
Cairn on the ridge of Beinn Lair. A glimpse of the top end of Lochan Fada can be seen below.

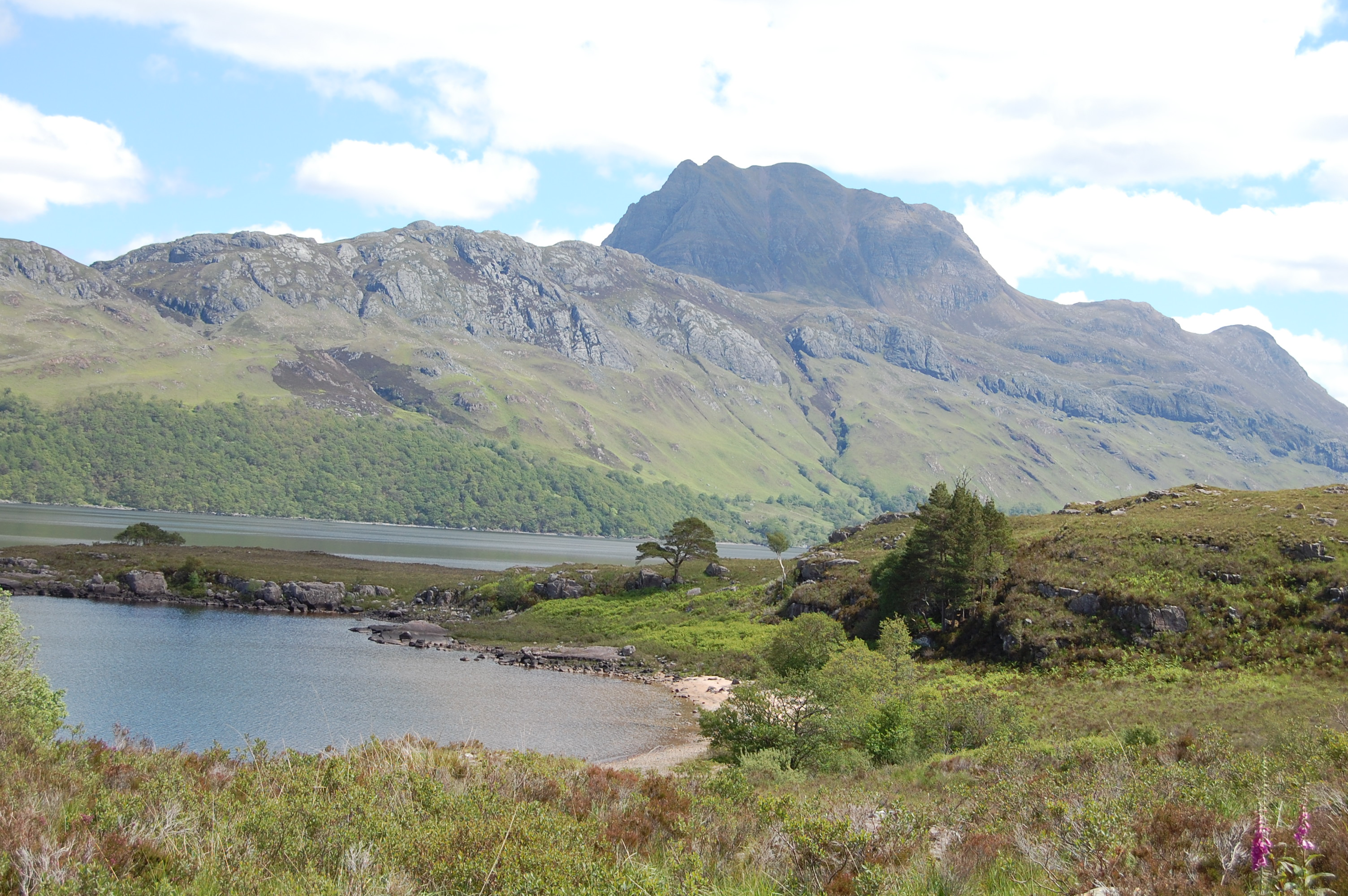
Looking towards Slioch from Grudie with Lochan Fada in the foreground
