= Loch Kernsary =

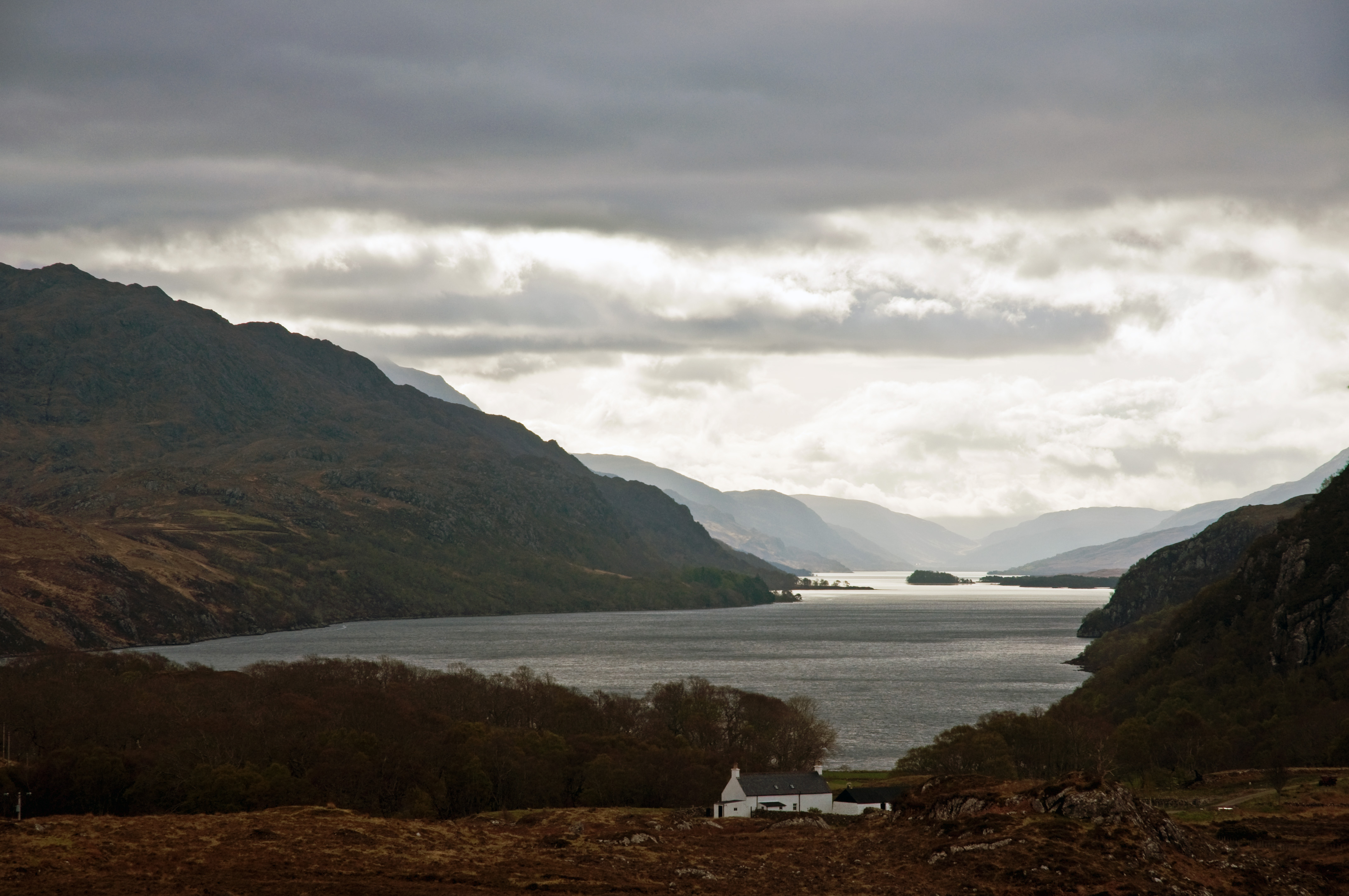
- Looking down Loch Kernsary

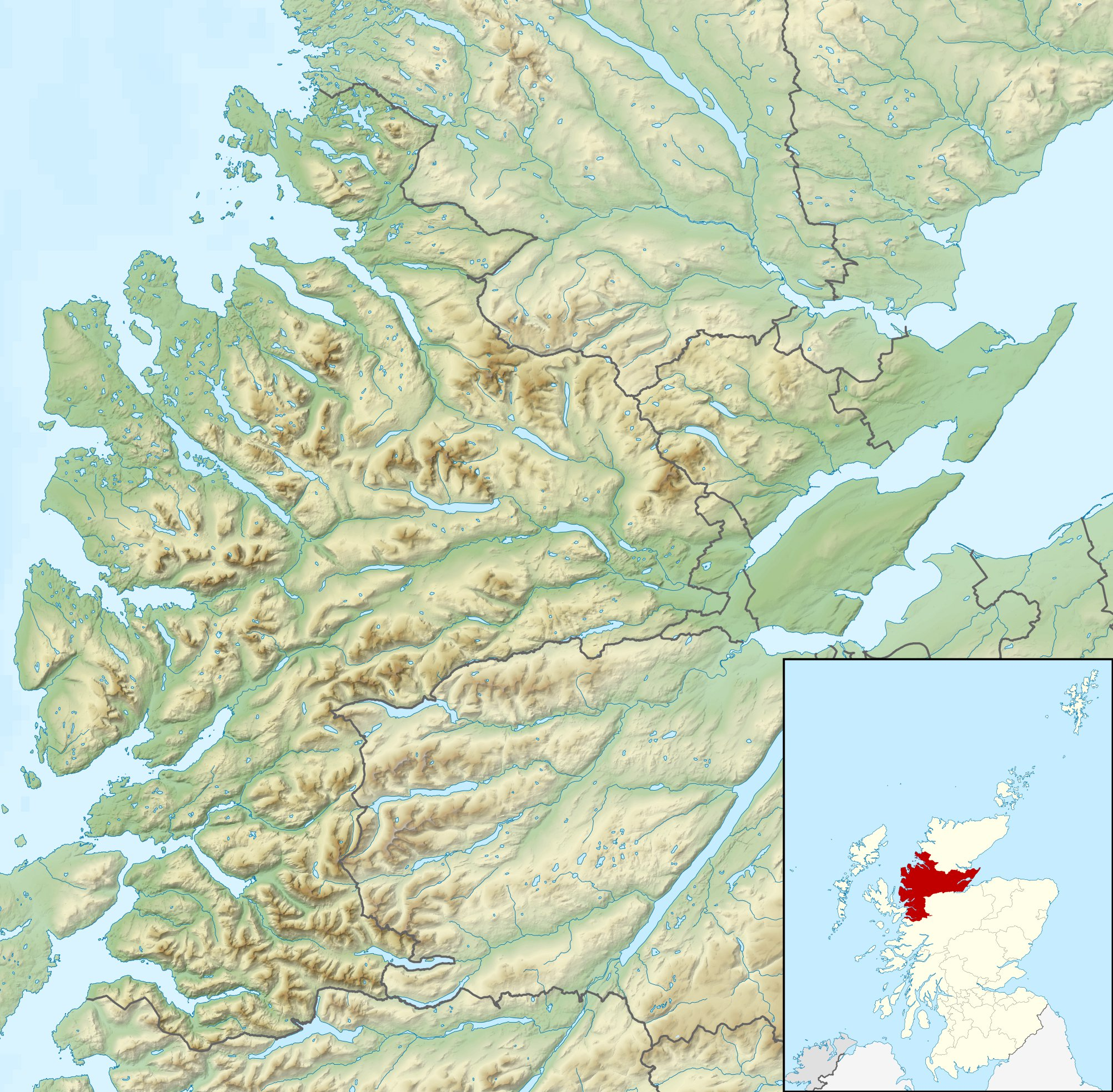
- Location in Wester Ross
- Location: NG88358018
- Coordinates: 57.760624°N 5.558404°W
- Type: freshwater loch
- Basin countries: Scotland
- Max. length: 2.0 km (1.2 mi)
- Max. width: 1.09 km (0.68 mi)
- Surface area: 93 ha (230 acres)
- Average depth: 38.05 ft (11.60 m)
- Max. depth: 92.8 ft (28.3 m)
- Water volume: 380,752,177 ft^{3} (10,781,701.0 m^{3})
- Shore length^{1}: 10 km (6.2 mi)
- Surface elevation: 23 m (75 ft)
- Max. temperature: 57 °F (14 °C)
- Min. temperature: 50.2 °F (10.1 °C) at 40 feet
- ^{1} Shore length is not a well-defined measure.

Loch Kernsary also known as Loch na h-Airde Bige is a small remote shallow low-altitude freshwater loch, located directly southeast of Poolewe in Kinlochewe, Wester Ross. It is fed by the river Coulin from the south and its outflow is into Loch Clair in the north-west. The Kernsary River drains into the loch from the south and in turn is drained through a tiny lochan Loch Poll Uidge à Chrò. The Lochan drains into the Inveran River, that drains a short distance into Loch Maree directly to the south-east.

== Site of scientific interest ==
Loch Kernsary is a part of a group of eleven other freshwater lochs in the Wester Ross area that are considered a Site of Special Scientific Interest. The eleven other lochs, all located to the north-west of Kinlochewe are: Loch a' Bhaid-luachraich, Lochan Dubh Druim na h-Airdhe, Loch Fada, Loch na Moine Buige, Fionn Loch, Loch na h-Uidhe, Lochan Beannach Mor, Lochan Beannach Beag, Loch a’ Mhadaidh Mor, Loch Garbhaig and Loch an Sgeireach. These 12 lochs support a nationally important flock of Black-throated loon, also known as the black-throated diver (Gavia arctica). Together they are part of the Wester Ross Lochs Special Protection Area which is considered of European importance.

== Crannog ==
On the south shore of Loch Kernsary on the small Àird Mhòr peninsula, there is the remains of a crannog, located some 10 metres from the shore and separated from the shore by a deep channel. The small flat island that is now covered with conifer trees, measures 30 metres on a north-south bearing by 23 metres on an east-west bearing.

About 20metres south-west of the crannog on land, is the remains of the boat-shaped building, hidden in the heather, measuring some 10metres by 5 metres. The walls measure 1.2 metres wife and 0.7 metres in height. The rough nature of the building design and the use of two rough orthostats at the entrance indicate that the building was built in the same period as the crannog.

== Walking ==
Loch Kernsary is the location of an almost level hiking route known as the Loch Kernsary Circular, that starts in Poolewe and follows the north coast of the Loch Kernsary, before making wide a circular walk back to the town and is about 12.2 km long.

== Gallery ==
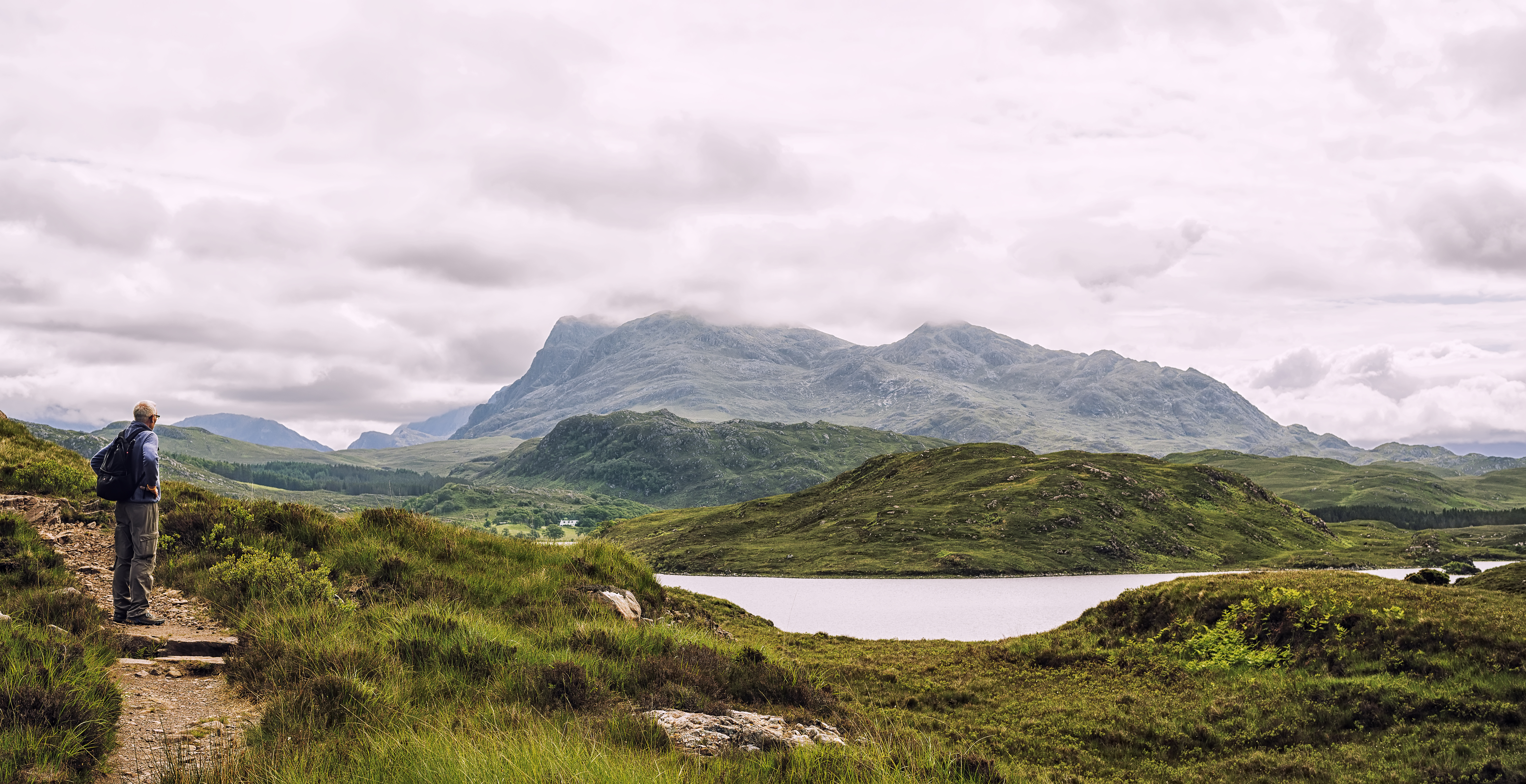
Loch Kernsary - Poolewe Circular Walk

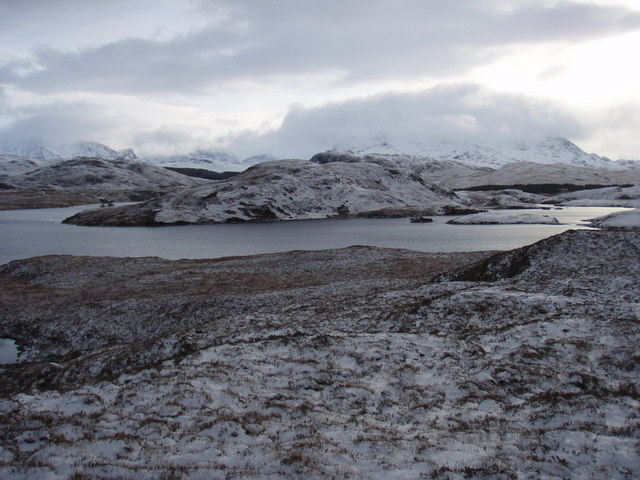
The western arm of the loch

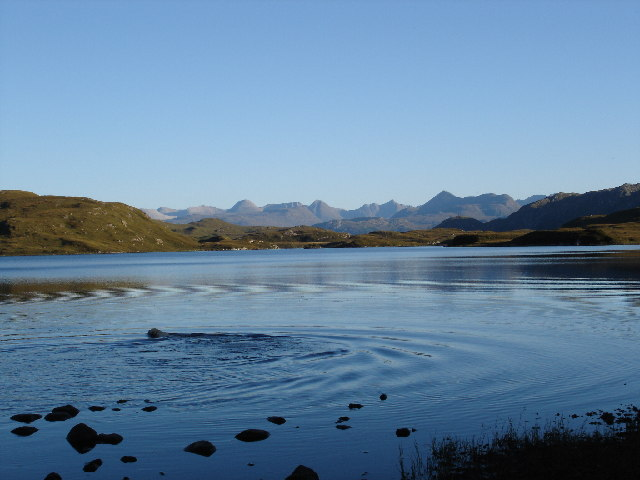
The view is taken looking South. Torridon in the background.

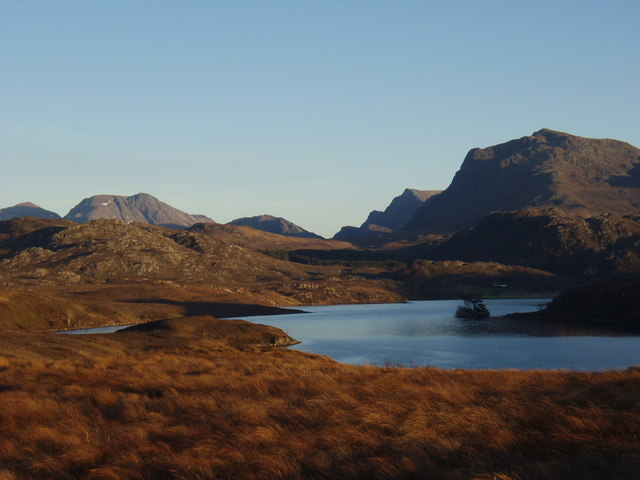
Loch Kernsary looking towards the Fisherfield forest

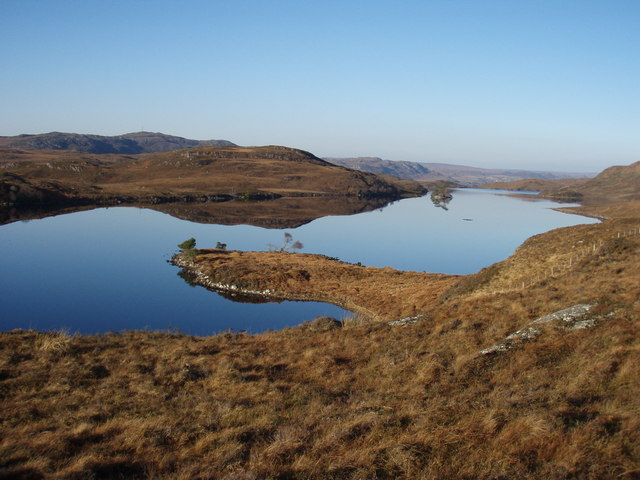
Looking along the length of the loch.

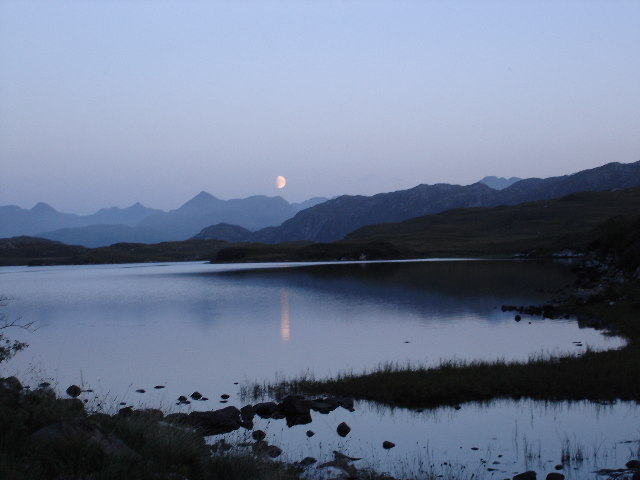
Moonrise over the loch

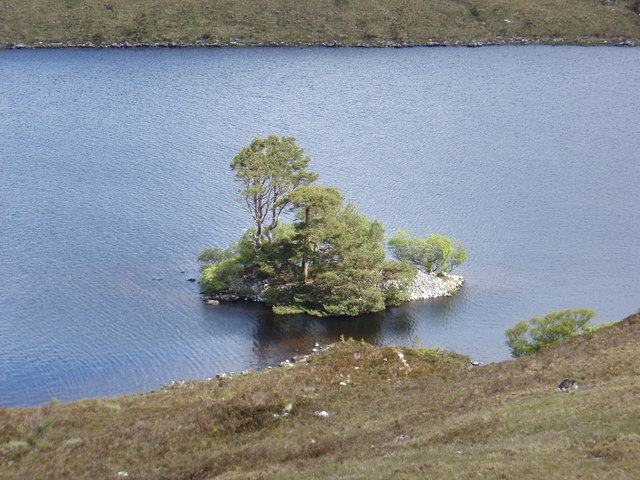
Forrested crannog
