= Loch Garbhaig, Letterewe Forest =

Loch Garbhaig
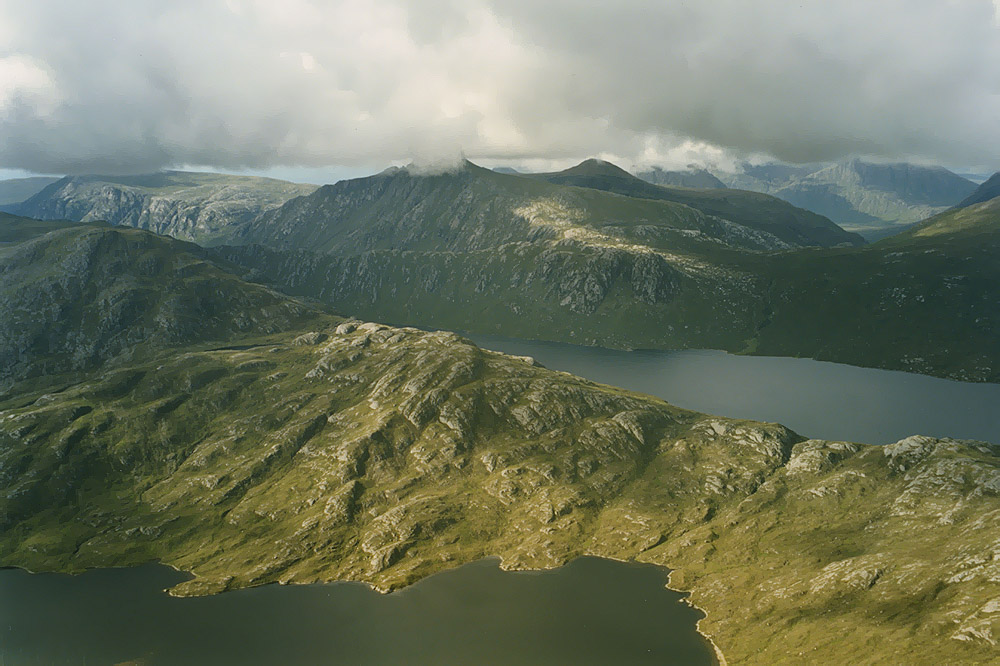
- View north from Slioch with Loch Garbhaig in the foreground and Lochan Fada in the distance.

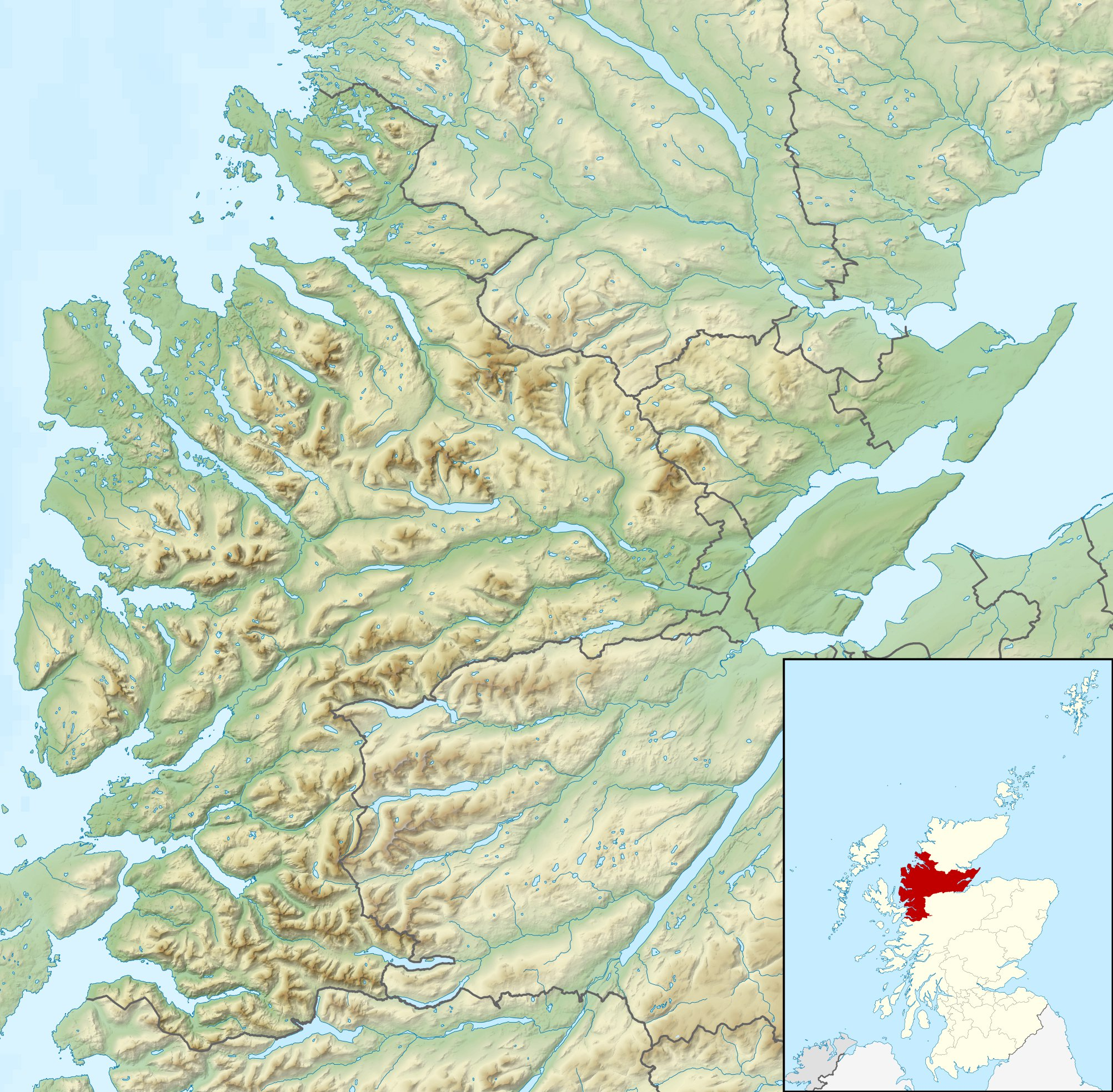
- Location in Wester Ross
- Location: NH00137054
- Coordinates: 57.68°N 5.3536°W
- Type: freshwater loch
- Basin countries: Scotland
- Max. length: 1.8 km (1.1 mi)
- Max. width: 0.4 km (0.25 mi)
- Surface area: 632 ha (1,560 acres)
- Average depth: 35.4 ft (10.8 m)
- Max. depth: 92.8 ft (28.3 m)
- Water volume: 230,532,625.8 ft^{3} (6,527,957.00 m^{3})
- Shore length^{1}: 6 km (3.7 mi)
- Surface elevation: 305 m (1,001 ft)
- Max. temperature: 51.5 °F (10.8 °C)
- Min. temperature: 44.1 °F (6.7 °C)
- ^{1} Shore length is not a well-defined measure.

Loch Garbhaig is a small remote shallow freshwater loch that lies underneath the northern cliffs of the mountain Slioch and is located between Loch Maree and Lochan Fada in Wester Ross in the Northwest Highlands of Scotland. Loch Garbhaig drains into Loch Maree through River Abhainn na Fùirneis.

== Gallery ==
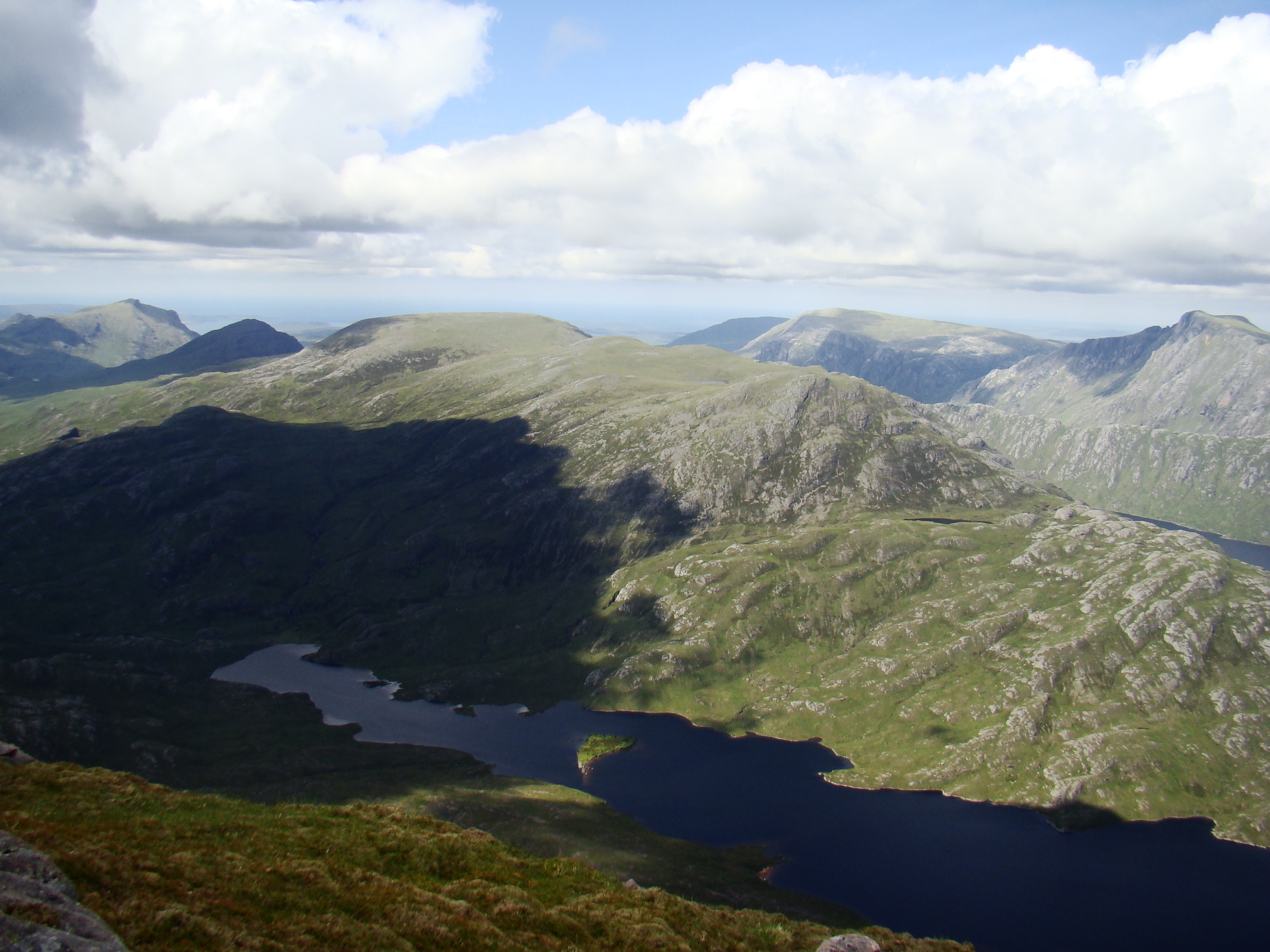
Loch Garbhaig, consumed by shadow

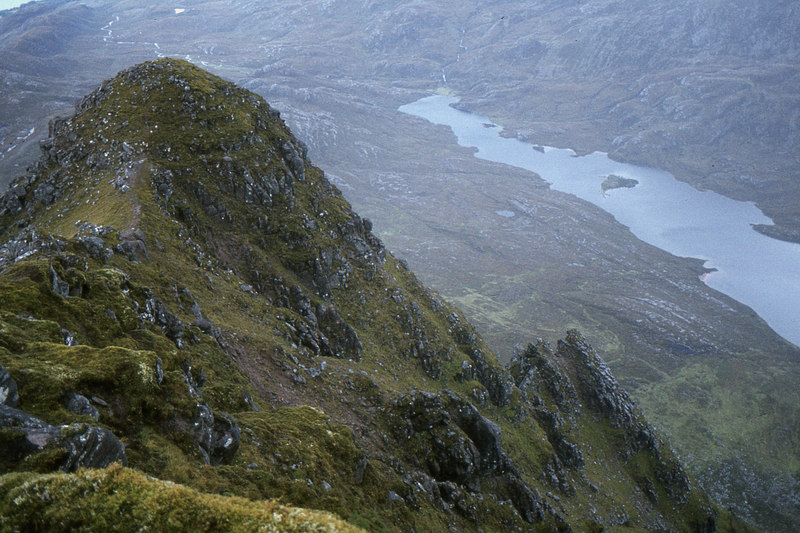
The NW face of Slioch falls very steeply to flatter ground about 400m below. Loch Garbhaig and its outflow, Abhainn na Fuirneis, are in view.

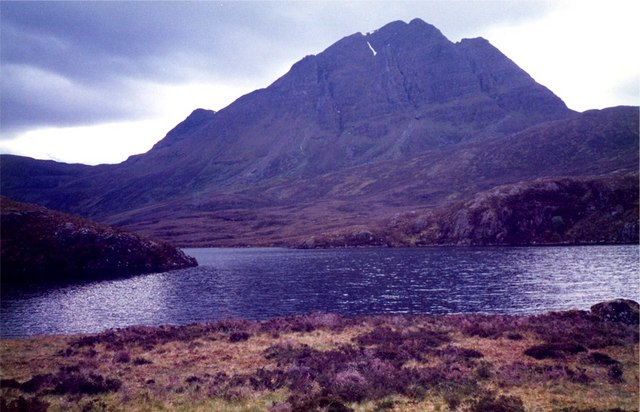
Loch Garbhaig and Slioch

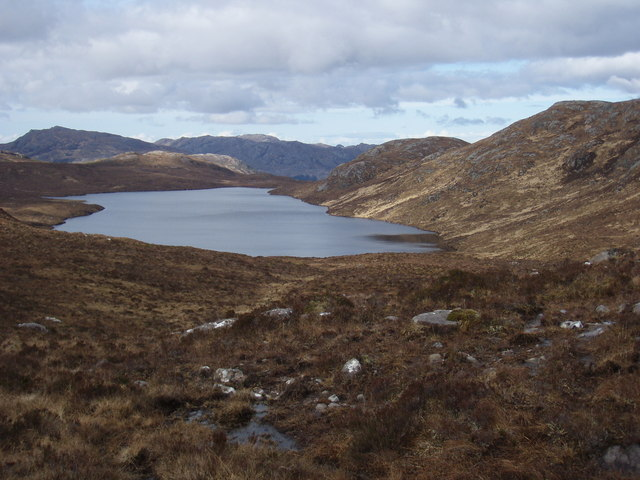
Loch Garbhaig The loch sits a couple of hundred metres above Loch Maree.
