= Loch a' Bhaid-luachraich =

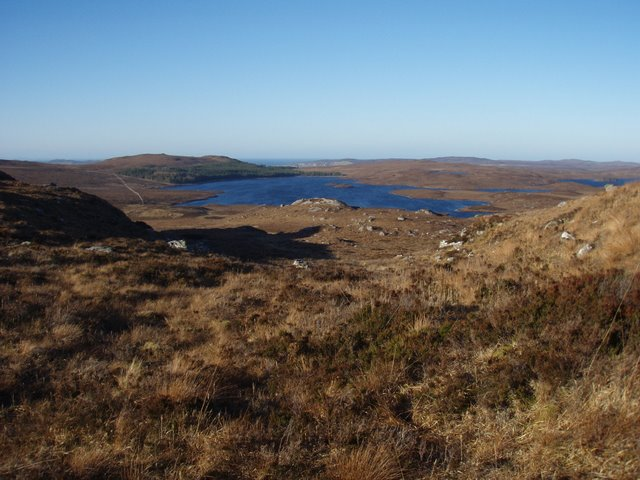
- View towards Loch a' Bhaid-luachraich

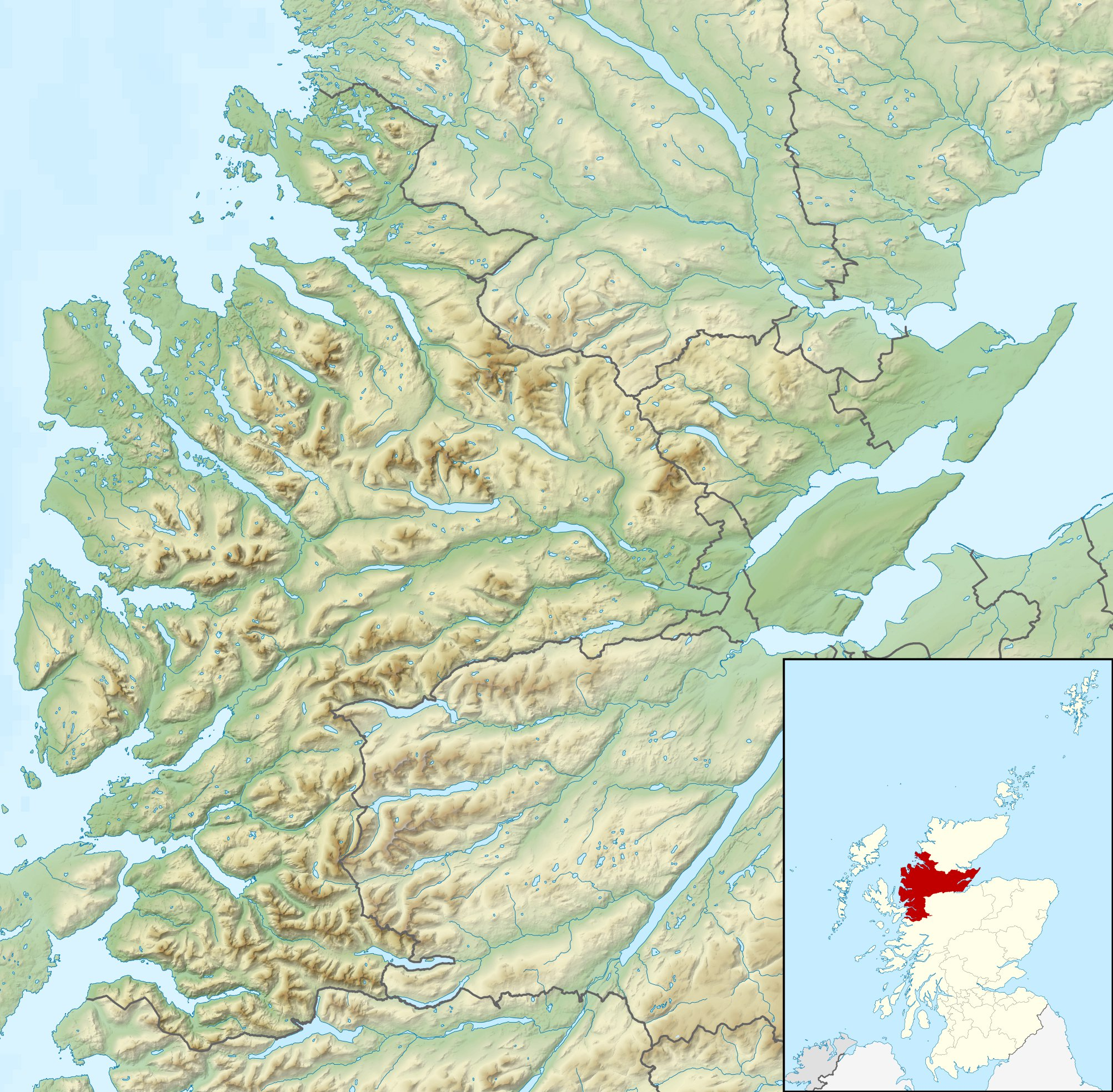
- Location in Wester Ross
- Location: NG89208611
- Coordinates: 57.815492°N 5.547036°W
- Type: freshwater loch
- Basin countries: Scotland
- Max. length: 2.0 km (1.2 mi)
- Max. width: 1.09 km (0.68 mi)
- Surface area: 130 ha (320 acres)
- Average depth: 34.1 ft (10.4 m)
- Max. depth: 143 ft (44 m)
- Water volume: 475,643,287 ft^{3} (13,468,718.0 m^{3})
- Shore length^{1}: 13 km (8.1 mi)
- Surface elevation: 95 m (312 ft)
- Max. temperature: 55.4 °F (13.0 °C)
- Min. temperature: 47.4 °F (8.6 °C) at 40 feet
- ^{1} Shore length is not a well-defined measure.

Loch a' Bhaid-luachraich (Loch of the Clump of Rushes) is a large shallow freshwater loch located directly south of Aultbea in Wester Ross. Loch a' Bhaid-luachraich can almost be considered as two irregular shaped lochs connected by a narrow channel. The south-west portion of the loch is the shallowest with the maximum depth of around 38 feet while the north-east section is the deepest at 141 feet. Loch a' Bhaid-luachraich drains into the Allt Beithe in the north which empties into the Loch Ewe sea loch at the small village of Aultbea about 1 mile north-west. Loch Mhic' Ille Riabhaich (Loch of the Son of the Brindled Lad), located to the south-east, drains into the loch from the south along the Uidh Mhic 'Ille Riabhaich stream.

== Geography ==
Loch a' Bhaid-luachraich is surrounded by low peatland covered round hillocks except the small hill of Càrn bad na h-Achlaise (The Cairn at the Bend of the Armpit) that is situated directly to the southeast at 243 metres.

== Fishing ==
Arctic char was discovered in Loch a' Bhaid-luachraich in 2012. This is the first time a population of such fish has been discovered there since before 1940.

== Gallery ==
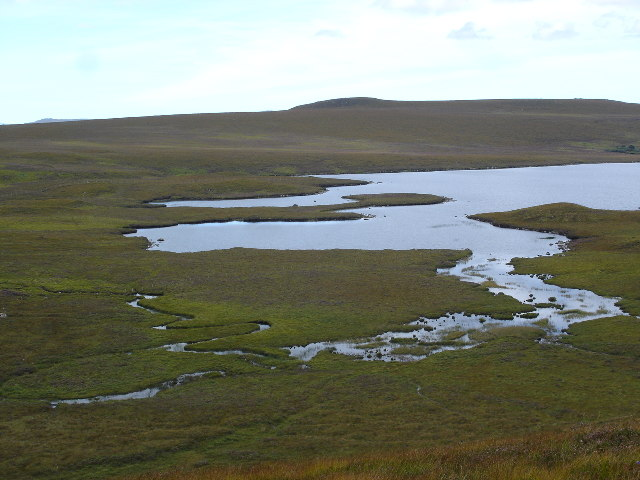
The southern end of Loch a' Bhaid-luachraich

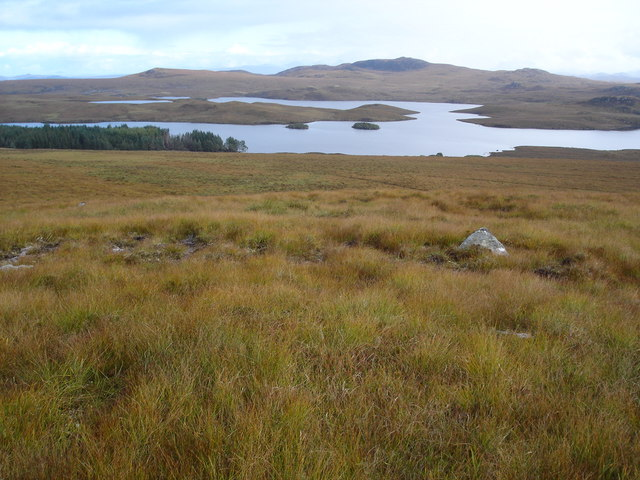
View of the loch from Meall Suil a' Chroth in the south-west

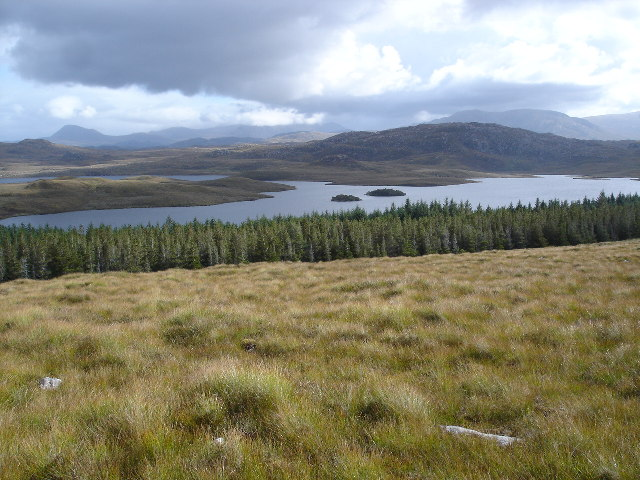
View of the loch from the shallow hill to the south

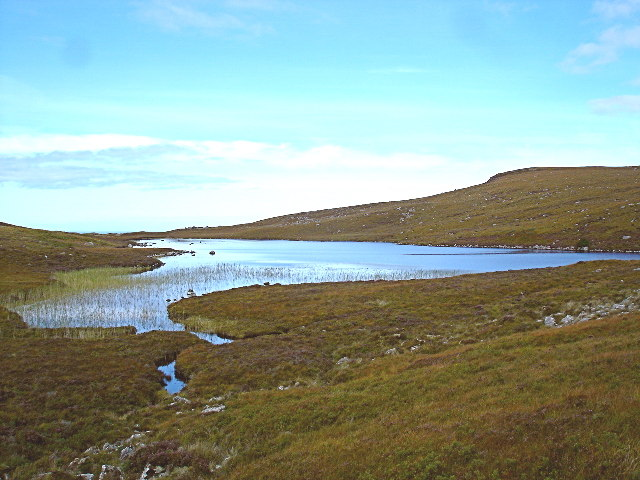
The small Loch na Claise Carnaich in the north-east that flows into Loch a' Bhaid-luachraich

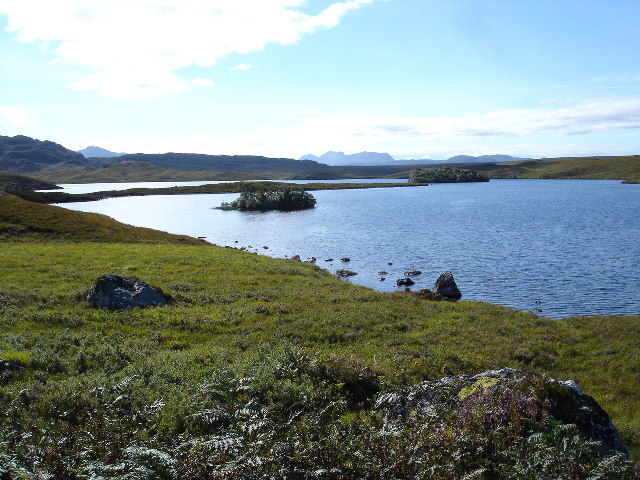
View of the Loch a' Bhaid-luachraich from the north

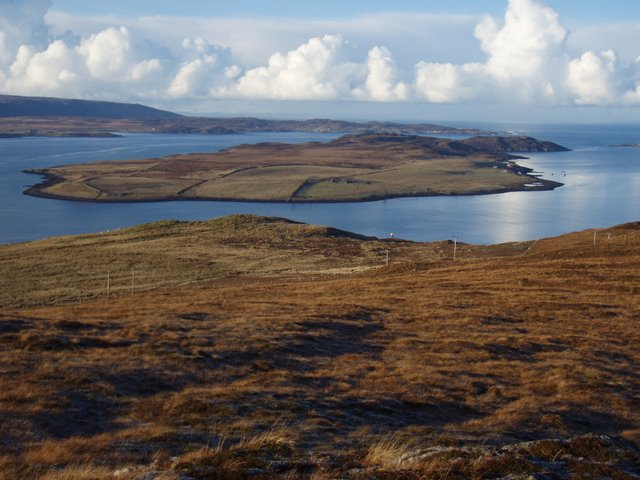
View west from the Loch towards the Isle of Ewe
