= Fionn Loch (Fisherfield Forest, Wester Ross) =

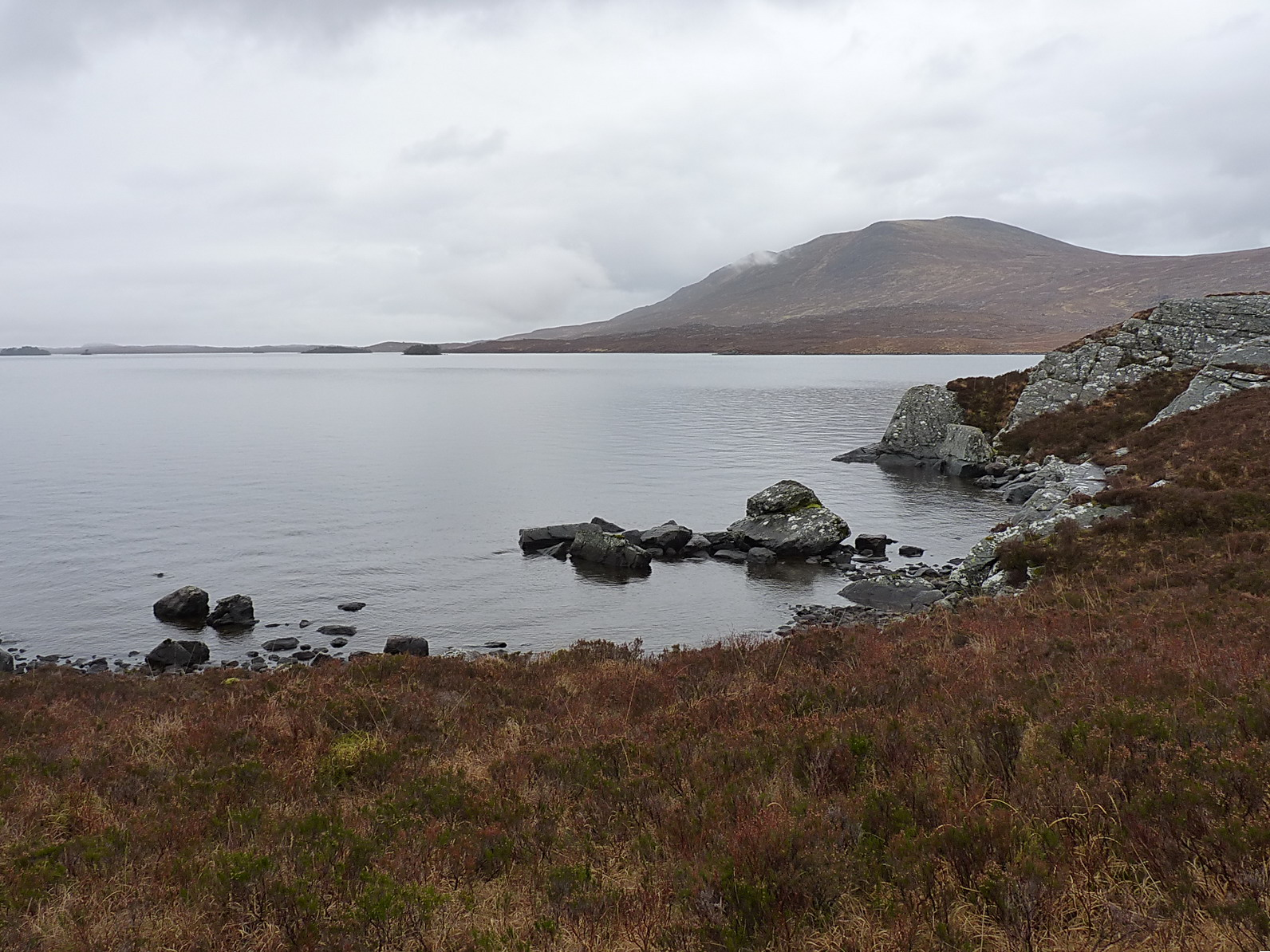
- Small bay on the Fionn Loch western shore, midway along the loch, at the end of Rubha Dubh peninsula

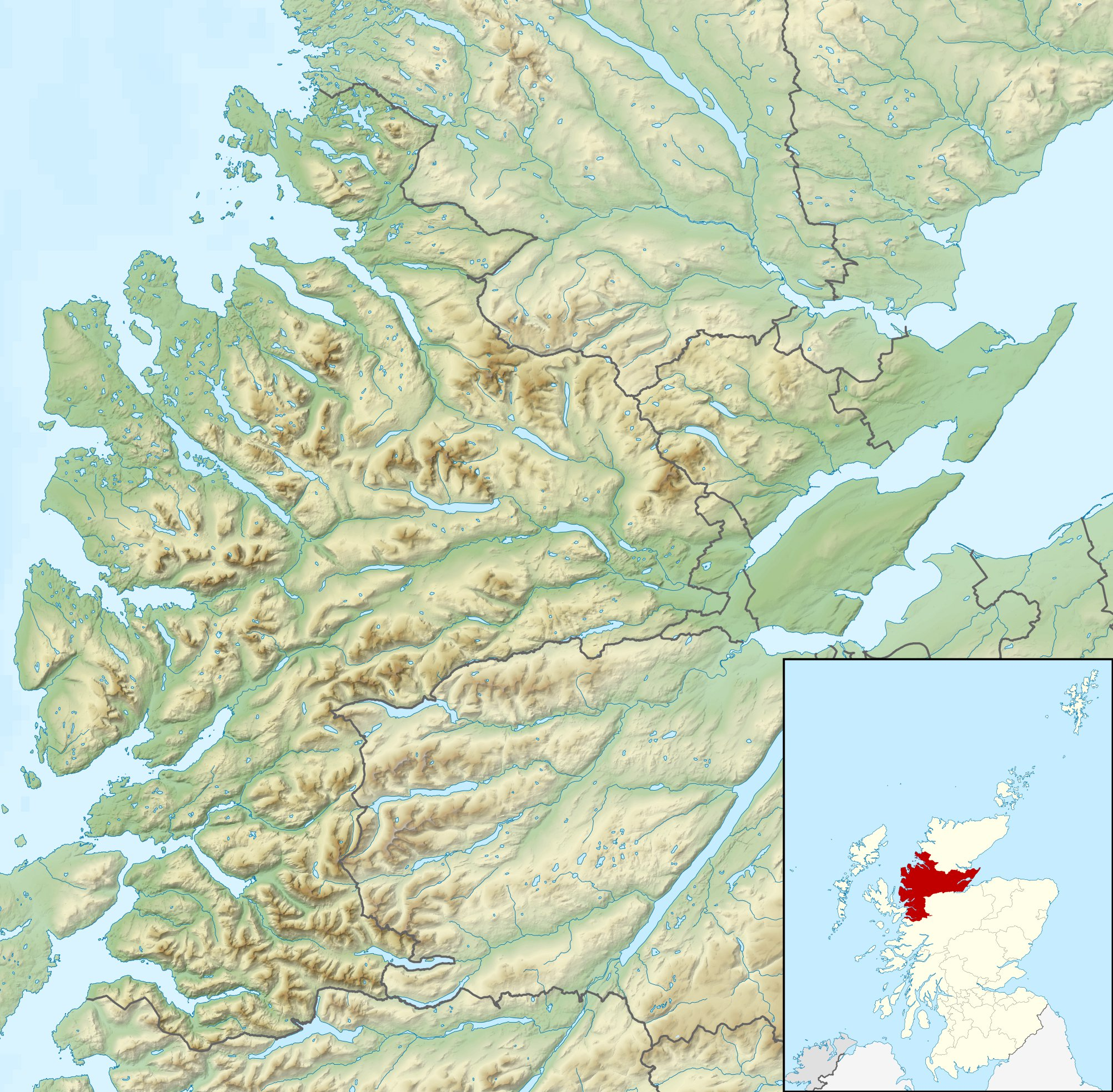
- Location in Wester Ross
- Location: NG94138002
- Coordinates: 57.751°N 5.448°W
- Type: freshwater loch
- Basin countries: Scotland
- Max. length: 9.6 km (6.0 mi)
- Max. width: 0.9 km (0.56 mi)
- Surface area: 1,014 ha (2,510 acres)
- Average depth: 57.74 ft (17.60 m)
- Max. depth: 144 ft (44 m)
- Water volume: 6,305,028,260 ft^{3} (178,538,518 m^{3})
- Shore length^{1}: 39 km (24 mi)
- Surface elevation: 171 m (561 ft)
- ^{1} Shore length is not a well-defined measure.

Fionn Loch is a remote deep freshwater loch. It is oriented roughly NNW–SSE and is about 7 km long and around 1 km wide. It lies four miles north-east of, and roughly parallel to, Loch Maree, 4.5 miles south-east of Aultbea and 6 miles east of Poolewe in Wester Ross.

== Dubh Loch ==
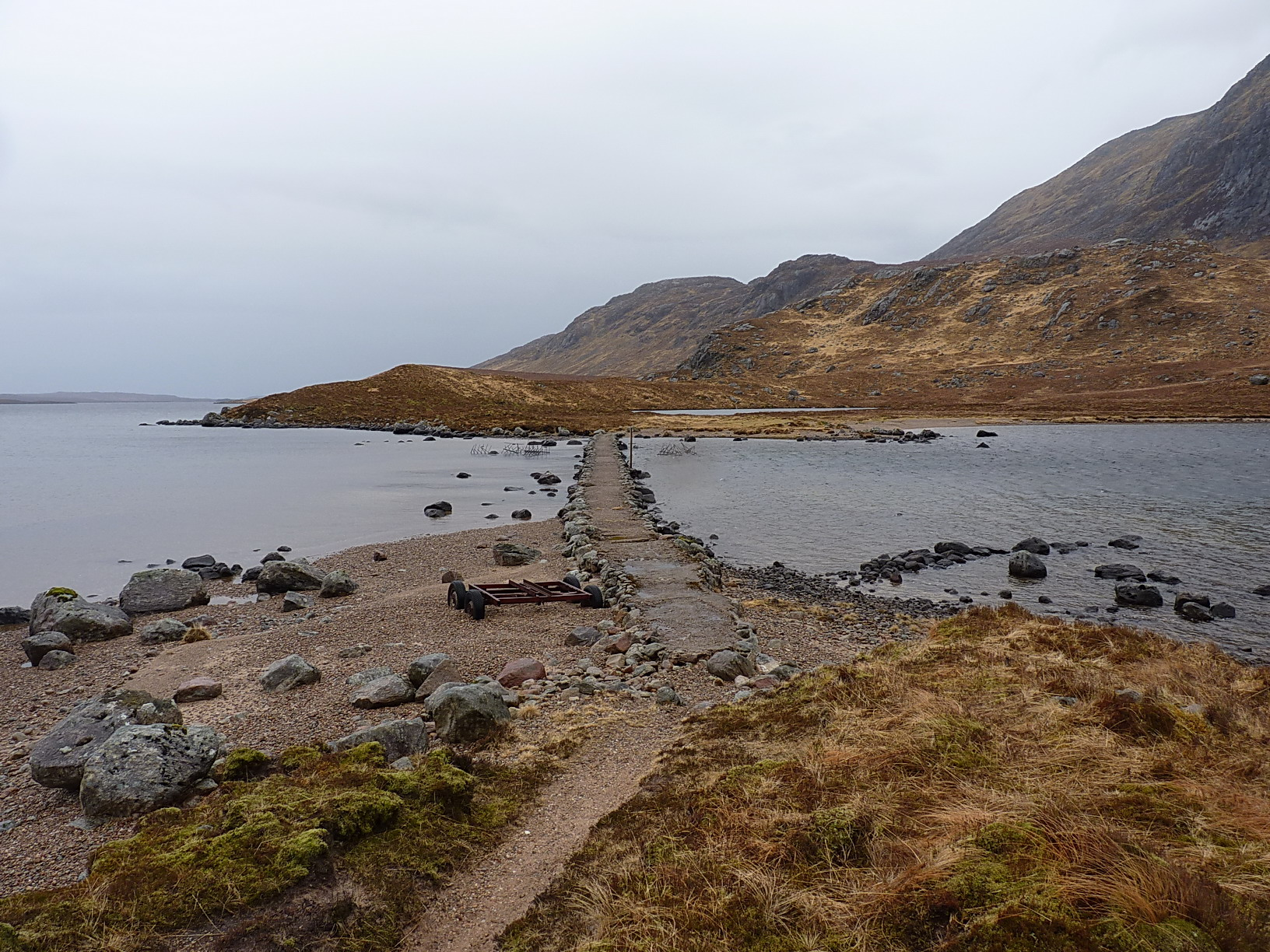
The Fionn Loch / Dubh Loch causeway

At the southern end of Fionn Loch is Dubh Loch ("White Loch" and "Black Loch"). This is a small loch that is separated from Fionn Loch by a shallow bar about 100 yards long, which is now used by a causeway to connect the two sides. In its 1876–77 session, the Outer House of the Court of Session decided that Dubh Loch was part of Fionn Loch, in an action brought by a fisherman who wanted to fish both lochs under the original fishing agreement without paying more. The decision was reversed by the Inner House of the court on appeal, before going to the House of Lords, where it was decided that both lochs were one. However, Dubh Loch is still marked as such on Ordnance Survey maps.
