= List of places in Angus =

List of settlements in Angus council area

This List of places in Angus is a list of links for any town, village and hamlet in the Angus council area of Scotland.

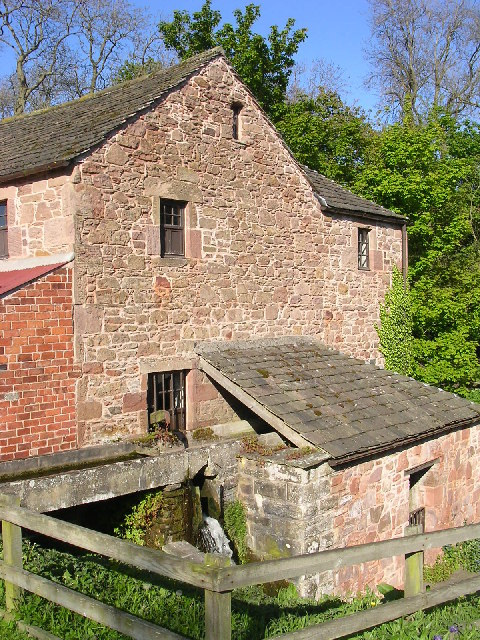
Barry Mill

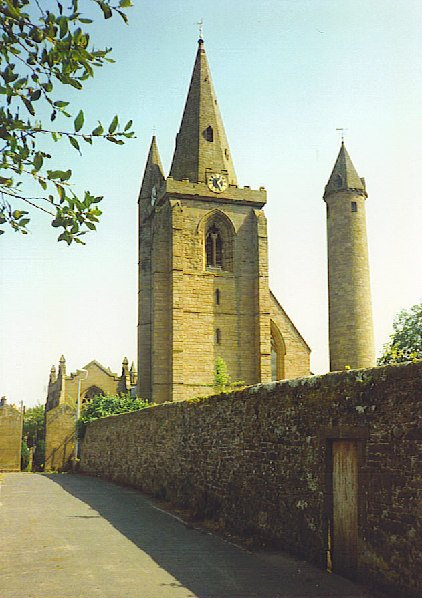
Brechin Cathedral and Round Tower

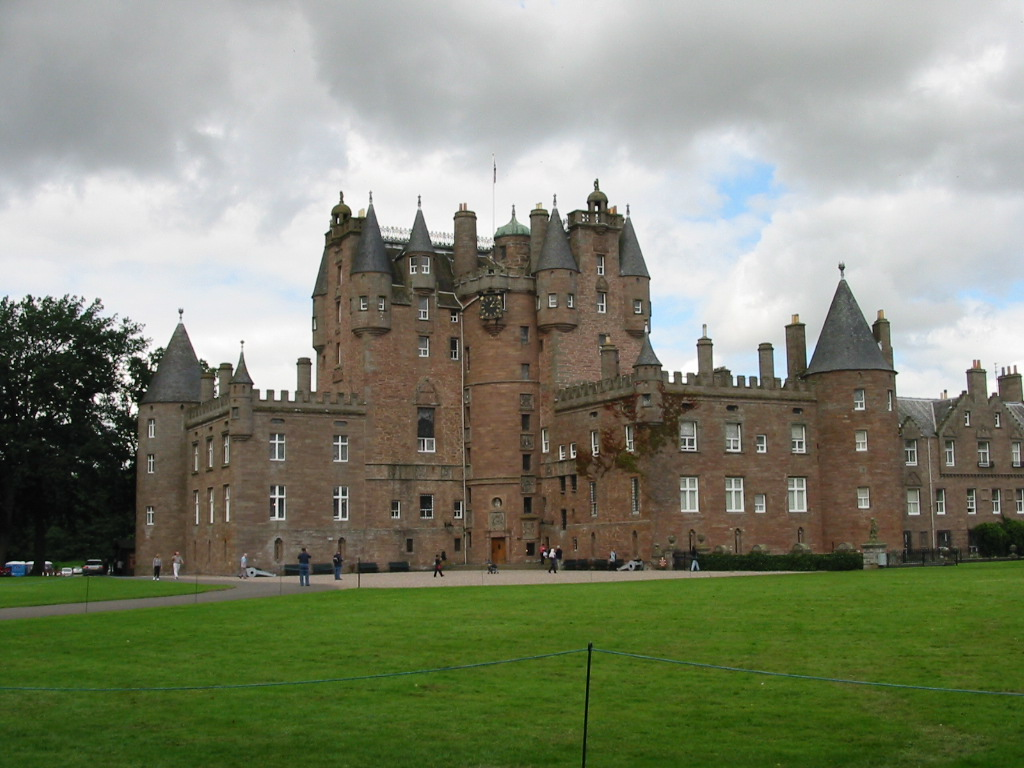
Glamis Castle

== A ==
- Aberlemno
- Airlie
- Arbirlot
- Arbroath
- Ardovie
- Ark Hill
- Ascreavie House
- Ashludie
- Auchmithie
- Auchterhouse

== B ==
- Balbirnie Mill
- Balintore
- Barry
- Birkhill
- Black Watch Memorial
- Boddin
- Bowriefauld
- Braes of Angus
- Brechin
- Bridgend of Lintrathen
- Bridgefoot
- Burnside of Duntrune

== C ==
- Caddam Wood
- Caenlochan
- Careston
- Carlogie
- Carmyllie
- Carnoustie
- Caterthun
- Craigo

== D ==
- Dalhousie, Dalhousie Arch
- Dun
- Dunnichen
- Dunninald
- Dykend

== E ==
- Eassie
- East Haven
- Edzell
- Elliot, Elliot Water

== F ==
- Falls of Drumly Harry
- Farnell
- Fern
- Ferryden
- Forfar, Forfar Loch
- Fowlis
- Friockheim

== G ==
- Glen Doll
- Glen Mark
- Guthrie

== H ==
- Hillside
- House of Dun
- House of Pitmuies

== I ==
- Inchbraoch
- Inchcape
- Inverarity
- Inverkeilor
- Invermark Castle
- Inverquharity Castle

== K ==
- Kemps Castle
- Kerr's Miniature Railway
- Kilry Glen
- Kinblethmont
- Kingennie
- Kingsmuir
- Kinnaber
- Kinnaird, Kinnaird Castle
- Kinnell
- Kinnettles
- Kirkbuddo
- Kirkinch
- Kirkton of Glenisla
- Kirkton of Kingoldrum
- Kirriemuir, Kirriemuir Aviation Museum, Kirriemuir Gateway to the Glens Museum

== L ==
- Ledyatt Loch
- Letham
- Leysmill
- Liff
- Lindsay Burial Aisle
- Links Park
- Little Forter
- Loch Lee
- Loch of Kinnordy
- Logie Cemetery
- Lunan Bay, Lunan Water
- Lunanhead
- Lundie

== M ==
- Mains Castle, Mains of Fintry
- Maison Dieu Chapel
- Maryton
- Marywell
- Meffan, Meffan Museum
- Melgam Water
- Melgund Castle
- Menmuir
- Mile Hill
- Milton of Ogilvie
- Monifieth, Monifieth railway station
- Monikie, Monikie Country Park
- Montreathmont Moor
- Montrose, Montrose Air Station Heritage Centre, Montrose Basin, Montrose Basin Wildlife Centre, Montrose Medal Golf Course
- Mount Keen
- Murroes

== N ==
- Newbigging
- Newtyle
- North Water Viaduct

== O ==
- Oathlaw
- Old Balkello

== P ==
- Panbride Church
- Panmure Castle, Panmure Golf Club, Panmure House
- Pictavia
- Piperdam
- Pirner's Brig

== R ==
- Red Castle
- Rescobie Loch
- Restenneth Priory
- River South Esk
- River Tay
- RM Condor
- Ruthven, Ruthven Castle

== S ==
- Scurdie Ness
- Seaton Cliffs
- Shanwell
- Sidlaw Hills
- Signal Tower Museum
- St Orland's Stone
- St Vigeans, St Vigeans Church
- Station Park
- Stone of Morphie
- Stracathro
- Strathmore

== T ==
- Tannadice
- Tarfside
- Tealing
- Templeton

== W ==
- Wellbank
- Wester Denoon
- Whigstreet

== See also ==
- List of places in Scotland
- List of places in Aberdeenshire
- List of places in Dundee
- List of places in Perth and Kinross
