= Castleton, Angus =

Village in Angus, Scotland

Coordinates: 56°36′23″N 3°05′17″W

Castleton
- Location within Angus
- OS grid reference: NO333466
- Council area: Angus
- Lieutenancy area: Angus
- Country: Scotland
- Sovereign state: United Kingdom
- Post town: FORFAR
- Postcode district: DD8
- Dialling code: 01307
- Police: Scotland
- Fire: Scottish
- Ambulance: Scottish
- UK Parliament: Angus
- Scottish Parliament: Angus

Castleton, officially Castleton Of Eassie, is a village in Angus, Scotland. This settlement is situated along the A94 road between Glamis and Meigle. One mile to the south is the village of Eassie and Eassie Old Church, noted for the presence of the Eassie Stone; this carved Pictish stone is dated prior to the Early Middle Ages. Slightly further to the south lies Ark Hill within the Sidlaw Hills.

Castleton Hotel stands on the medieval fortification that gives the settlement its name, an enormous defensive mound surrounded by a broad ditch. The rectangular earthwork is 12-to-14-foot (3.7 to 4.3 m) deep in the north-east, with a three-foot internal rampart, elsewhere it is shallower. There are no visible remains of the buildings of the medieval castle, which were perhaps largely of wood.

== See also ==
- Glamis Castle
