= List of listed buildings in Eassie And Nevay, Angus =

This is a list of listed buildings in the parish of Eassie and Nevay in Angus, Scotland.

== List ==
Name	Location	Date Listed	Grid Ref. (Note: Sometimes known as OSGB36, the grid reference (where provided) is based on the British national grid reference system used by the Ordnance Survey. • "Guide to National Grid". Ordnance Survey. • "Get-a-map". Ordnance Survey.)	Geo-coordinates	Notes	LB Number (Note: Historic Environment Scotland assign a unique alphanumeric identifier to each designated site in Scotland, for listed buildings this always begins with "LB", for example "LB12345".)	Image
Nevay Old Kirk, Kirkinch				56°35′02″N 3°07′16″W	Category B	4639	Upload another image
Nevay Old Kirkyard Walls				56°35′02″N 3°07′18″W	Category B	4640	Upload another image
Sculptured Stone Of Eassie				56°35′30″N 3°05′15″W	Category B	4642	Upload another image See more images
Old Granary - Eassie Station				56°36′38″N 3°03′52″W	Category C(S)	4646	Upload Photo
Old Schoolhouse, East Of Kirk				56°35′35″N 3°05′03″W	Category C(S)	4638	Upload another image
Eassie Bridge Over Eassie Burn				56°36′46″N 3°03′09″W	Category C(S)	4645	Upload Photo
Eassie And Nevay Parish Kirk				56°35′30″N 3°05′15″W	Category B	4636	Upload Photo
Eassie Old Kirk				56°36′52″N 3°03′24″W	Category B	4641	Upload another image
Eassie Old Kirkyard Wall				56°36′51″N 3°03′24″W	Category B	4643	Upload another image
Eassie Old Parish Kirk Manse				56°36′52″N 3°03′27″W	Category B	4644	Upload Photo
Parish Kirk Manse				56°35′29″N 3°05′14″W	Category B	4637	Upload Photo

== Key ==
The scheme for classifying buildings in Scotland is:

- Category A: "buildings of national or international importance, either architectural or historic; or fine, little-altered examples of some particular period, style or building type."
- Category B: "buildings of regional or more than local importance; or major examples of some particular period, style or building type, which may have been altered."
- Category C: "buildings of local importance; lesser examples of any period, style, or building type, as originally constructed or moderately altered; and simple traditional buildings which group well with other listed buildings."

In March 2016 there were 47,288 listed buildings in Scotland. Of these, 8% were Category A, and 50% were Category B, with the remaining 42% being Category C.

== See also ==
- List of listed buildings in Angus
