= Meigle =

Coordinates: 56°35′13″N 3°9′51″W

Meigle: Scottish Gaelic: Mìgeil
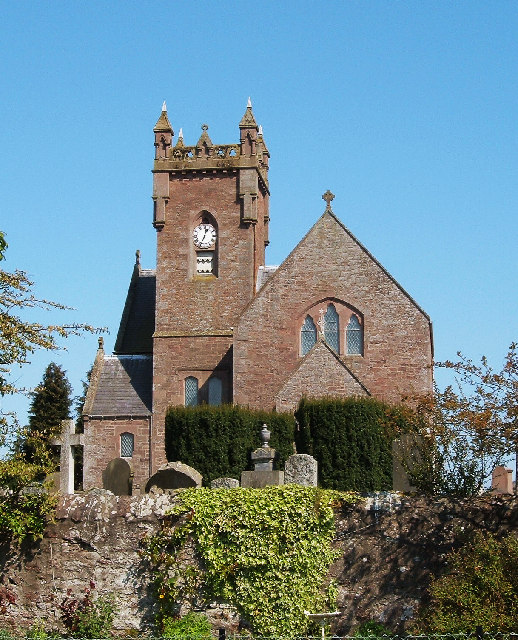
- Meigle Parish Church

- Location within Perth and Kinross
- Population: 357 (1971)
- OS grid reference: NO287446
- Council area: Perth and Kinross
- Lieutenancy area: Perth and Kinross
- Country: Scotland
- Sovereign state: United Kingdom
- Post town: BLAIRGOWRIE
- Postcode district: PH12
- Police: Scotland
- Fire: Scottish
- Ambulance: Scottish
- UK Parliament: Angus and Perthshire Glens
- Scottish Parliament: Perthshire North

Meigle (Scottish Gaelic: Mìgeil, IPA: [ˈmiːkʲɪl]) is a village in Strathmore, Scotland. It lies in the council area of Perth and Kinross in the Coupar Angus and Meigle ward. It lies on the A94 road between Perth and Forfar.The A94 used to be the main route between Aberdeen and Perth. Other smaller settlements nearby are Balkeerie, Kirkinch and Kinloch. Meigle is accessed from the north and south via the B954 road. In 1971 it had a population of 357.

== Etymology ==
The name Meigle is of Pictish origin. Recorded as Migdele in the Legend of Saint Andrew, the first element is *mig, meaning "swamp, bog, quagmire", and the second is dol, "field, meadow" (cf. Welsh mig-dôl).

== Area history ==
The Pictish stones on display at Meigle are a manifestation of the early history of the area. The village of Eassie, approximately three kilometres (1.9 mi) to the east of Meigle, is noted for the presence of the Eassie Stone, a carved Pictish stone dated to the Early Middle Ages.

== Attractions ==
The Meigle Sculptured Stone Museum is housed in the former Victorian village school and contains a collection of more than thirty Pictish Stones, along with some later carvings dating from between the 8th and 10th centuries. The village was probably the site of an important early medieval Pictish monastery, centred on the present church and churchyard. The collection is cared for by Historic Scotland and is open in summer.

Nearby Belmont Castle, constructed from the 15th century originally as a residence of the Bishops of Dunkeld, was the home of Sir Henry Campbell-Bannerman (1836–1908), Prime Minister of the United Kingdom 1905–08, who is buried in the village churchyard; a mural monument to his memory is built into the north-east wall of the church. Meigle is also home to Meigle C.C. a cricket team which competes in the Strathmore Union.

== Transportation ==
Meigle railway station was a stop on the Alyth Railway, which served the village from 1861 to 1951.

== Notable people ==
- Gordon Drummond, international cricketer for Scotland
- Ralph Laing, first-class cricketer
- Hugh Lyon Playfair

== See also ==
- Drumkilbo
- Kilry Glen
