= Kinloch, Coupar Angus =

Coordinates: 56°34′42″N 3°12′34″W

Kinloch: Scottish Gaelic: Ceann Loch
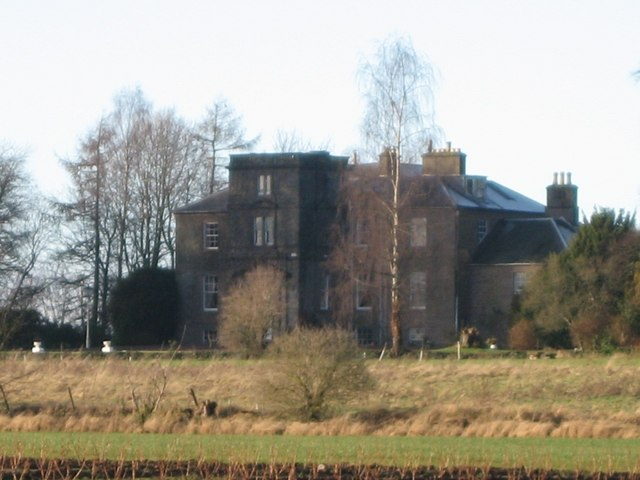
- Kinloch House

- Location within Perth and Kinross
- OS grid reference: NO258436
- Council area: Perth and Kinross
- Lieutenancy area: Perth and Kinross
- Country: Scotland
- Sovereign state: United Kingdom
- Police: Scotland
- Fire: Scottish
- Ambulance: Scottish
- Scottish Parliament: North Tayside; North East Scotland

Kinloch /ˈkɪnlɒx/ is a small settlement along the A94 road in the Coupar Angus and Meigle ward of the council area of Perth and Kinross in eastern Scotland. Approximately 4 1/2 miles (7 kilometres) east is the village of Eassie, noted for the presence of the Eassie Stone; this carved Pictish stone is dated prior to the Early Middle Ages.

The most prominent building is Kinloch House, designed and built by the radical MP George Kinloch in 1798, replacing an older house on the same site. From around 1972, until his death in 1989, Kinloch House was the residence of Captain the 6th Earl of Enniskillen, MBE, an Anglo-Irish aristocrat. Popularly known as David Enniskillen, he had been born into a famous Ulster family and had spent much of his life in Kenya.

== See also ==
- Meigle Sculptured Stone Museum
- The Earl of Enniskillen
- Florence Court
