= Mile Hill =

Mile Hill may refer to:

- Mile Hill, Dykehead, Angus, Scotland
- Mile Hill (Marilyn), Angus, Scotland

== See also ==
- Battle of Mile Hill, American civil war battle near Leesburg, Virginia
- Miles Hill, Leeds, West Yorkshire, England
- Mill Hill - various locations
