= Balkeerie =

Coordinates: 56°35′25″N 3°05′33″W

- Location within Angus
- Population: 74
- OS grid reference: NO330448
  - Edinburgh: 44 mi (71 km)
- Council area: Angus
- Lieutenancy area: Angus
- Country: Scotland
- Sovereign state: United Kingdom
- Post town: FORFAR
- Postcode district: DD8
- Dialling code: 01307
- Police: Scotland
- Fire: Scottish
- Ambulance: Scottish
- UK Parliament: Angus
- Scottish Parliament: Angus

Balkeerie is a village in Angus, Scotland north of Dundee. It has an elevation of 222 feet (68 m) above sea level. It is one mile (1.6 km) to the north east of kirkinch and two-thirds of a mile (1.1 km) to the west of the village of Eassie. Eassie is noted for the presence of the Eassie Stone, a carved Pictish stone.

== See also ==
- Wester Denoon

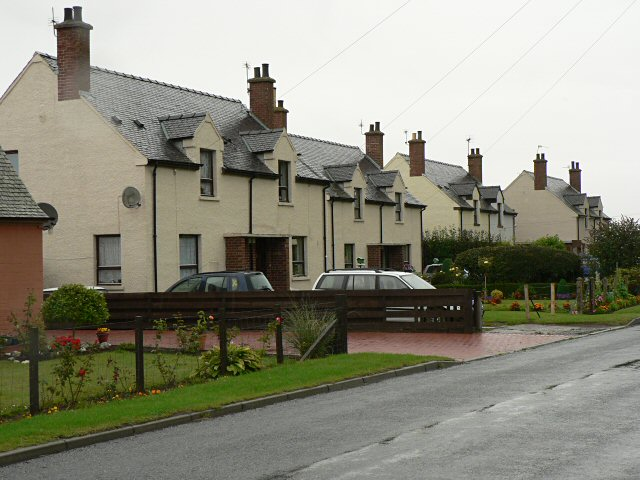
Houses at Balkeerie
