= Gordon Laing =

Gordon Laing may refer to:

- Gordon Laing (musician), British classical bassoonist, contrabassoonist, and pedagogue
- Gordon Laing (cricketer), Scottish cricketer
- Gordon Jennings Laing, American classical scholar

== See also ==
- Alexander Gordon Laing, Scottish explorer
- Gordon Lang, Welsh Congregationalist minister and politician
