= List of listed buildings in Glamis, Angus =

This is a list of listed buildings in the parish of Glamis in Angus, Scotland.

== List ==
Name	Location	Date Listed	Grid Ref. (Note: Sometimes known as OSGB36, the grid reference (where provided) is based on the British national grid reference system used by the Ordnance Survey. • "Guide to National Grid". Ordnance Survey. • "Get-a-map". Ordnance Survey.)	Geo-coordinates	Notes	LB Number (Note: Historic Environment Scotland assign a unique alphanumeric identifier to each designated site in Scotland, for listed buildings this always begins with "LB", for example "LB12345".)	Image
Arniefoul '1677' Cottage With Boundary Walls				56°35′19″N 2°58′45″W	Category C(S)	45670	Upload Photo
Bridgend Farm, Ice House				56°37′08″N 3°01′00″W	Category C(S)	45671	Upload Photo
Deanbank Cottages With Boundary Wall				56°37′01″N 3°01′03″W	Category B	45672	Upload Photo
Deanbank House With Railings And Gates				56°37′00″N 3°00′58″W	Category C(S)	45673	Upload Photo
Glamis Castle Policies, Garden Statuary				56°37′17″N 2°59′52″W	Category C(S)	45679	Upload Photo
Glamis House With Boundary Wall				56°36′36″N 3°00′40″W	Category B	45686	Upload Photo
Glamis Village, The Square, Building To Nw Of Strathmore Arms Hotel				56°36′31″N 3°00′15″W	Category B	45708	Upload Photo
Haughs Of Cossans Farmhouse				56°38′02″N 2°58′33″W	Category C(S)	45710	Upload Photo
Mains Of Glamis Cottages With Boundary Walls				56°37′04″N 2°59′20″W	Category C(S)	45712	Upload Photo
Mains Of Rochelhill Farmhouse With Boundary Walls				56°35′40″N 3°01′09″W	Category B	45714	Upload Photo
Tarbrax Steading				56°34′41″N 3°00′33″W	Category C(S)	45720	Upload Photo
Dryburn Farmhouse With Boundary Walls				56°34′00″N 3°00′50″W	Category C(S)	11672	Upload Photo
Glamis Castle Policies, James Vi Statue				56°37′10″N 3°00′10″W	Category B	11708	Upload Photo
Bridgend Bridge Over Dean Water				56°37′06″N 3°00′52″W	Category B	11712	Upload another image
Bridgend Farmhouse With Former Dairy, Ancillary Structures, Boundary Walls And Gatepiers				56°37′09″N 3°00′54″W	Category B	11713	Upload Photo
Glamis Village, 6 And 8 Main Street, The Pewton Cottages, Between Foote's And Strapper's Close, Including Ancillary Structures				56°36′30″N 3°00′15″W	Category B	11572	Upload Photo
Glamis Village, 7 Main Street, Between Steenie And Quoit Green Close				56°36′30″N 3°00′17″W	Category B	11575	Upload Photo
Arniefoul, Sw Cottage With Ancillary Structures				56°35′18″N 2°58′42″W	Category C(S)	45669	Upload Photo
Glamis Castle Policies, Earl Michael's (Garden) Bridge				56°37′27″N 2°59′52″W	Category C(S)	45676	Upload another image
Glamis Castle Policies, Ha-Ha				56°37′09″N 3°00′11″W	Category C(S)	45680	Upload Photo
Glamis Castle Policies, The Warren With Ancillary Structures				56°37′28″N 3°00′31″W	Category B	45682	Upload Photo
Glamis Village, Back Dykes, Gig House/Workshop To Rear Of 18 Main Street				56°36′28″N 3°00′17″W	Category C(S)	45687	Upload Photo
Glamis Village, Braehead Road, Old Smithy				56°36′28″N 3°00′08″W	Category C(S)	45692	Upload Photo
Glamis Village, Braehead Road, Woodfaulds Cottage With Ancillary Structures And Boundary Walls				56°36′26″N 3°00′03″W	Category C(S)	45693	Upload Photo
Glamis Village, Kirkwynd, Parish Kirk, Graveyard, Walls And Gravestones				56°36′34″N 3°00′05″W	Category B	45694	Upload Photo
Glamis Village, 15 Main Street				56°36′30″N 3°00′19″W	Category C(S)	45698	Upload Photo
Glamis Village, Main Street, Corner House				56°36′29″N 3°00′21″W	Category B	45705	Upload another image
Hatton Of Ogilvie Farmhouse				56°35′14″N 3°00′24″W	Category C(S)	45709	Upload Photo
Meikle Kilmundie Farmhouse				56°34′42″N 2°59′22″W	Category C(S)	45715	Upload Photo
Nether Arniefoul Farmhouse, Steading, Cottage And Boundary Walls				56°35′52″N 2°59′04″W	Category B	45716	Upload Photo
Tarbrax Bridge Over Glen Ogilvy Burn				56°34′38″N 3°00′41″W	Category C(S)	11669	Upload another image
Glamis Village, Braehead Road, Auld Mill Bridge Over Glamis Burn				56°36′28″N 3°00′06″W	Category C(S)	11696	Upload another image See more images
Glamis Village, The Square, Old Market Cross				56°36′30″N 3°00′12″W	Category C(S)	11699	Upload Photo
Glamis Castle Policies, Sundial				56°37′11″N 3°00′06″W	Category A	11705	Upload another image
Hunters Hill, Standing Stone Thornton				56°36′25″N 2°59′21″W	Category B	11715	Upload Photo
Glamis Village, Kirkwynd, Angus Folk Museum, Former Hearse House And Cartshed And Granary With Boundary Walls				56°36′34″N 3°00′12″W	Category C(S)	11562	Upload Photo
Glamis Village, 2 The Square, Strathmore Arms Hotel, Former Post Office House				56°36′31″N 3°00′12″W	Category B	11566	Upload Photo
Glamis Village, 5 The Square, White House With Boundary Walls				56°36′31″N 3°00′10″W	Category C(S)	11568	Upload Photo
Arniefoul, Se Cottage				56°35′17″N 2°58′38″W	Category C(S)	45668	Upload Photo
Glamis Castle Policies, Dutch Garden With Boundary Walls, Gatepiers And Gates				56°37′13″N 3°00′06″W	Category B	45675	Upload Photo
Glamis Castle Policies, The Parsonage				56°37′26″N 3°00′37″W	Category C(S)	45683	Upload Photo
Glamis Village, To Rear Of 7 Main Street, Hanton's Yard, Old Jail				56°36′31″N 3°00′16″W	Category C(S)	45696	Upload Photo
Glamis Village, To Rear Of 7 Main Street, Hanton's Yard, Workshop				56°36′31″N 3°00′17″W	Category B	45697	Upload Photo
Glamis Village, 12 And 14 Main Street				56°36′30″N 3°00′16″W	Category C(S)	45702	Upload Photo
Glamis Village, 24 Main Street				56°36′29″N 3°00′19″W	Category B	45704	Upload Photo
Glamis Village, Main Street, The Washing Green, Water Pump And Well				56°36′28″N 3°00′22″W	Category C(S)	45706	Upload Photo
2 Plans Of Thornton, Greengate				56°36′32″N 2°58′33″W	Category C(S)	45718	Upload Photo
Mains Of Rochelhill Dovecot				56°35′38″N 3°01′10″W	Category A	11670	Upload another image See more images
Glamis Castle Policies, North Lodge (Gladiator) Gate				56°37′15″N 3°00′56″W	Category B	11700	Upload another image See more images
Glamis Castle				56°37′13″N 3°00′09″W	Category A	11701	Upload another image
Glamis Castle Policies, West Tower				56°37′11″N 3°00′15″W	Category B	11707	Upload another image
Glamis Village, 6 And 7 The Square, Lairdie's Brae Houses				56°36′30″N 3°00′12″W	Category B	11570	Upload Photo
Glamis Village, 10 Main Street, Between Strapper's Close And Greenhill's Close				56°36′30″N 3°00′16″W	Category C(S)	11573	Upload Photo
Glamis Village, 26 Main Street With Ancillary Structure				56°36′29″N 3°00′20″W	Category B	11578	Upload Photo
Glamis Castle, Polices, Game Larder				56°37′15″N 3°00′03″W	Category C(S)	45677	Upload Photo
Glamis Castle Policies, Walled Garden				56°37′30″N 2°59′56″W	Category B	45684	Upload another image
Glamis Village, 17 Main Street				56°36′29″N 3°00′19″W	Category C(S)	45700	Upload Photo
Glamis Village, 19 Main Street				56°36′29″N 3°00′20″W	Category C(S)	45701	Upload Photo
Upper Hayston Farmhouse With Walled Garden, Boundary Walls, Gatepiers And Gates				56°35′59″N 2°58′14″W	Category C(S)	45711	Upload Photo
Wester Denoon Dovecot				56°34′31″N 3°03′50″W	Category B	11671	Upload Photo
Glamis Castle Policies, Dovecot				56°36′48″N 3°00′18″W	Category A	11710	Upload another image
Milton Mill, Detached Kiln And Stables				56°34′58″N 3°00′17″W	Category B	11724	Upload Photo
Glamis Castle Polices, Kirk Gate				56°36′36″N 3°00′06″W	Category B	11558	Upload Photo
Glamis Village, 1 The Square, Strathmore Arms Hotel				56°36′31″N 3°00′13″W	Category B	11565	Upload Photo
Glamis Village, 4 The Square, Bakery House				56°36′31″N 3°00′12″W	Category B	11567	Upload Photo
Glamis Village, 16 Main Street, Between Craig's Close And Nicol's Close				56°36′29″N 3°00′17″W	Category B	11577	Upload Photo
Glamis Village, Dundee Road, Glamis Primary School With Playshed				56°36′26″N 3°00′23″W	Category C(S)	45690	Upload Photo
Mains Of Glamis Steading				56°36′57″N 2°59′24″W	Category B	45713	Upload Photo
Arniefoul Bridge Over Glamis Burn				56°35′50″N 2°59′10″W	Category C(S)	11723	Upload another image See more images
Glamis Village, Kirkwynd, Parish Kirk Of St Fergus (Church Of Scotland) With Session House				56°42′48″N 2°28′05″W	Category B	11555	Upload another image See more images
Glamis Village, Kirkwynd, Parish Kirk Manse Including East Wall, Gatepiers, Gates And Boundary Walls				56°36′35″N 3°00′08″W	Category B	11559	Upload Photo
Glamis Village, 6 Kirkwynd, Formerly Head Forester's House With Boundary Walls				56°36′32″N 3°00′12″W	Category C(S)	11564	Upload Photo
Glamis Village, 1 Main Street				56°36′31″N 3°00′14″W	Category B	11574	Upload another image
Glamis Village, 20 Dundee Road, Strathmore Estates Office With Ancillary Structure And Gatepiers				56°36′23″N 3°00′13″W	Category C(S)	45689	Upload Photo
Tarbrax Farmhouse With Ancillary Structure And Boundary Walls				56°34′40″N 3°00′33″W	Category C(S)	45719	Upload Photo
Glamis Village, 20 And 22 Main Street				56°36′29″N 3°00′18″W	Category B	12381	Upload Photo
Milton Mill Bridge Over Glen Ogilvy Burn				56°34′55″N 3°00′19″W	Category C(S)	11668	Upload Photo
Glamis Village, Glamis Saw Mill, The Mill Slap				56°36′23″N 3°00′07″W	Category C(S)	11697	Upload Photo
Glamis Castle Policies, Charles I Statue				56°37′09″N 3°00′09″W	Category B	11709	Upload Photo
Glamis Village, Braehead Road, Masonic Hall, Lodge Glamis 99 With Boundary Walls				56°36′30″N 3°00′09″W	Category C(S)	11569	Upload Photo
Arniefoul, Nw Cottage With Ancillary Structure				56°35′18″N 2°58′42″W	Category C(S)	45667	Upload Photo
Glamis Village, Charleston Road And Kirriemuir Road, War Memorial With Plinth				56°36′27″N 3°00′30″W	Category C(S)	45688	Upload Photo
Glamis Village, Dundee Road, Glamis Schoolhouse				56°36′26″N 3°00′23″W	Category C(S)	45691	Upload Photo
Glamis Village, 18 Main Street, Between Craig's Close And Nicol's Close				56°36′29″N 3°00′18″W	Category B	45703	Upload Photo
Glamis Village, 4 Braehead Road, Old Smiddy House With Boundary Walls				56°36′30″N 3°00′10″W	Category B	13770	Upload Photo
Glamis Village, Braehead Road, The Auld Mill And Joiner's Workshop				56°36′29″N 3°00′07″W	Category B	13771	Upload Photo
Glamis Castle Policies, North Bridge				56°37′26″N 3°00′04″W	Category B	11702	Upload another image
Glamis Castle Policies, Icehouse				56°36′59″N 2°59′50″W	Category C(S)	11704	Upload Photo
Glamis Castle Policies, Earl John Bridge				56°37′12″N 3°00′25″W	Category B	11711	Upload Photo
Glamis Castle Policies, Garden House				56°37′31″N 3°00′03″W	Category B	45678	Upload Photo
Glamis Castle Policies, Italian Garden				56°37′14″N 2°59′57″W	Category B	45681	Upload another image See more images
Glamis Village, 8 And 9 The Square, Post Office, Lairdie's Brae Houses, With Ancillary Structures				56°36′30″N 3°00′12″W	Category B	45707	Upload Photo
Nether Hayston Farmhouse				56°36′21″N 2°57′26″W	Category B	45717	Upload Photo
Glamis Castle Policies, Mains Bridge (East)				56°37′07″N 2°59′49″W	Category C(S)	13780	Upload Photo
Glamis Castle Policies, Main Gate (South Lodge)				56°36′29″N 3°00′31″W	Category B	11698	Upload Photo
Glamis Castle Policies, East Tower				56°37′09″N 3°00′04″W	Category B	11706	Upload Photo
Glamis Village, Kirkwynd, Parish Kirk, Strathmore Aisle				56°36′34″N 3°00′04″W	Category A	11556	Upload Photo
Glamis Village, Kirkwynd, Angus Folk Museum				56°36′33″N 3°00′11″W	Category B	11563	Upload another image
Glamis Village, 2 Main Street, Heritage Centre, East Of Foote's Close				56°36′30″N 3°00′14″W	Category C(S)	11571	Upload Photo
Glamis Village, 9 - 13 (Odd Nos) Main Street Between Quoit Green Close And Blackadder Square				56°36′30″N 3°00′18″W	Category B	11576	Upload Photo
Glamis Village, 6 Braehead Road, Auld Mill House				56°36′30″N 3°00′08″W	Category B	11580	Upload Photo

== Key ==
The scheme for classifying buildings in Scotland is:

- Category A: "buildings of national or international importance, either architectural or historic; or fine, little-altered examples of some particular period, style or building type."
- Category B: "buildings of regional or more than local importance; or major examples of some particular period, style or building type, which may have been altered."
- Category C: "buildings of local importance; lesser examples of any period, style, or building type, as originally constructed or moderately altered; and simple traditional buildings which group well with other listed buildings."

In March 2016 there were 47,288 listed buildings in Scotland. Of these, 8% were Category A, and 50% were Category B, with the remaining 42% being Category C.

== See also ==
- List of listed buildings in Angus
