= Hilton, Angus =

Hilton, Angus, may refer to two villages in Scotland:

- Hilton (Lintrathen), Angus, Bridgend of Lintrathen
- Hilton (Inverkeilor), Angus, Inverkeilor
