= Saint Fergus =

Fergus
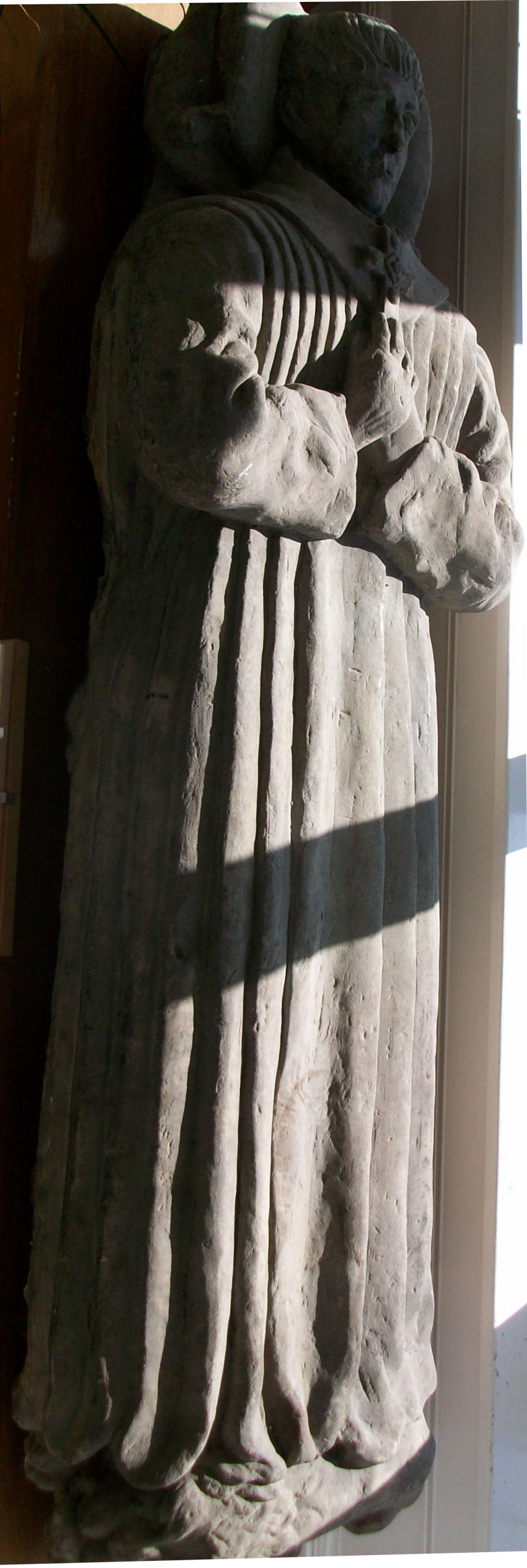
- An effigy of Saint Fergus, carved in the 15th Century.

Bishop
- Born: unknown Ireland
- Died: c. 730; Scotland
- Venerated in: Catholic Church; Eastern Orthodox Church; Anglican Communion
- Feast: 8 September (Ireland); 18 November (Scotland)

Saint Fergus (also Fergustian) (died c. 730 AD) was a bishop who worked in Scotland as a missionary.

== Life ==
Ten saints of this name are mentioned in the martyrology of Donegal.

The exact date and place of Fergus's birth remain unknown. He was a contemporary of St. Drostan and St. Donevaldus. The name is of Pictish origin and he is recorded as Fergus, a Pictish bishop, so it is generally considered he was from the north east of what is now called Scotland. In the Aberdeen Breviary he is called Fergustian and "he occupied himself in converting the barbarous people." He is thought to have trained in Ireland or the south of Scotland, possibly both.

Known in the Irish martyrologies as St. Fergus Cruithneach, or the Pict, the Breviary of Aberdeen states that he had been a bishop for many years in Ireland when he went on a mission to Alba with some chosen priests and other clerics. He settled first near Strageath, in Upper Strathearn, in Upper Perth, and erected three churches in that district. The churches of Strageath, Blackford, and Dolpatrick are found there dedicated to St. Patrick. He next evangelized Caithness and established there the churches of Wick and Halkirk.

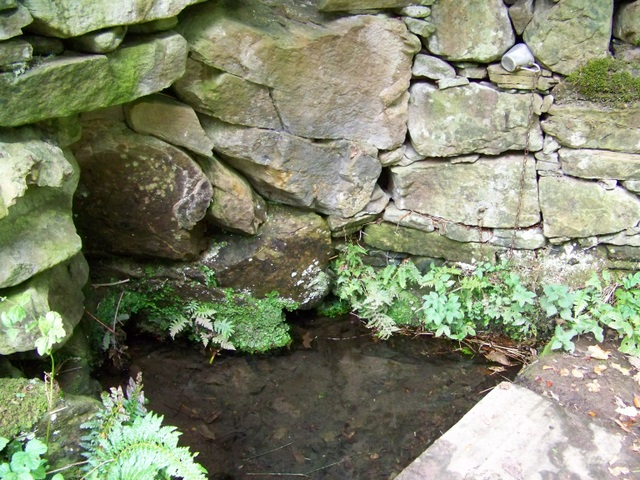
St Fergus Well, Glamis

The church Fergus built at Glamis would have been in the Celtic "mud and wattle" style, not far from the present kirk. He may have been the Fergustus Pictus who went to Rome in 721, but such a contention relies solely on the similarity of a common name. He died about 730 and was buried at Glamis, Angus, where the recently restored St Fergus' Well can be visited. The village church at Eassie is dedicated to Saint Fergus; the noted Pictish Eassie Stone has been moved to that church.

== Veneration ==
During the time of James IV, the Abbot of Scone removed his head to Scone church and built an expensive shrine for it. Aberdeen was able to obtain an arm of the saint.

Saint Fergus is the patron saint of Glamis and Wick.

The Martyrology of Tallaght mentions his festival on 8 September, but in Scotland it was previously on 18 November.

== See also ==
- Eassie Stone
