= Kirkinch =

Coordinates: 56.583759°N 3.121677°W

- Location within Angus
- OS grid reference: NO312441
- Council area: Angus
- Lieutenancy area: Angus
- Country: Scotland
- Sovereign state: United Kingdom
- Post town: Blairgowrie
- Postcode district: PH12
- Dialling code: 01828
- Police: Scotland
- Fire: Scottish
- Ambulance: Scottish
- UK Parliament: Angus
- Scottish Parliament: Angus South

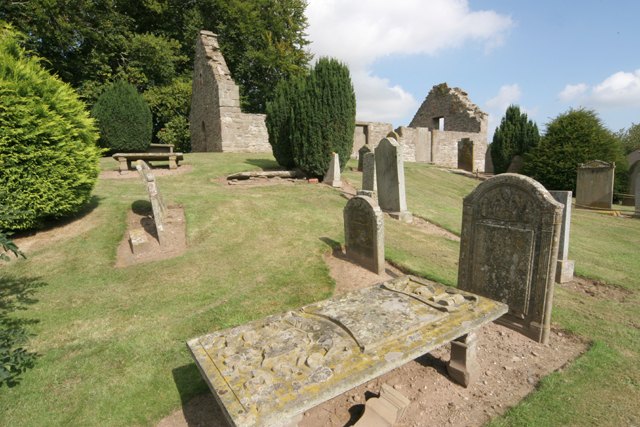
The ruins of Nevay Church and graveyard

Kirkinch, meaning 'kirk (church) on the island' in Scots and Gaelic, is a small village in Angus, Scotland. The 'island' is the knoll on which stand the remains of the late 16th century Nevay Church and its medieval burial ground. Nevay parish is now united with Eassie parish. Originally it was an 'island' of slightly higher land surrounded by boggy country. The village houses are adjacent to the knoll, which is encompassed by the wall of the old churchyard. Some of the earliest history of the local area is represented approximately two kilometres northwest at the village of Eassie, where the Eassie Stone is displayed in a modern transparent shelter in the ruined former parish church; this finely carved Pictish cross-slab probably dates to the first half of the 8th century (Historic Scotland; accessible at all times). The church site at Kirkinch is itself probably of early Christian origin. A simple disc-headed cross-slab found here is on display at the Meffan Institute in Forfar.

== See also ==
- Kilry Glen
- Kinloch
- Newbigging
- Wester Denoon
