= Dandaleith stone =

Pictish stone discovered at Craigellachie and now in the Elgin Museum, Moray, Scotland

Coordinates: 57.490°N 3.187°W

The Dandaleith Stone
- Material: Pink Granite
- Height: 1.7 metres (5 ft 7 in)
- Symbols: Eagle; Notched rectangle and z-rod; Mirror case; Crescent and V-rod
- Created: Sixth-Eighth Century CE
- Discovered: May 2013
- Place: Craigellachie, Scotland
- Classification: Class I incised stone
- Culture: Picto-Scottish

The Dandaleith stone is a Class I Pictish stone from Craigellachie, Scotland. It was discovered in May 2013 during ploughing.

== Location ==
The exact location of the find is currently unreported due to the archaeological vulnerability of the site. The stone underwent conservation before going on display at Elgin museum.

== Description ==
The stone is 1.7 metres (5 ft 7 in) high, 0.5 metres (1 ft 8 in) wide and 0.36 metres (1 ft 2 in) deep, and is carved from pink granite. It bears incised Pictish symbols on two adjacent faces, a notched rectangle and z rod and mirror case on one and an eagle and crescent and v rod on another. The arrangement of symbols on adjacent faces is unusual and may be unique.
