= Wester Denoon =

Coordinates: 56.576162°N 3.066108°W

- Location within Angus
- OS grid reference: NO346432
- Council area: Angus
- Lieutenancy area: Angus
- Country: Scotland
- Sovereign state: United Kingdom
- Post town: FORFAR
- Postcode district: DD8
- Dialling code: 01307
- Police: Scotland
- Fire: Scottish
- Ambulance: Scottish
- UK Parliament: Angus
- Scottish Parliament: Angus South

Wester Denoon is a small settlement in Angus, Scotland. Approximately one mile to the north of Wester Denoon is the village of Eassie, where the Eassie Stone is displayed in a ruined church; this carved Pictish stone is dated prior to the Early Middle Ages. Other nearby settlements are Charleston, Balkeerie and Kirkinch. Two fragments of small Pictish cross-slabs have also been found at Wester Denoon itself (preserved in the Meffan Institute, Forfar). One shows the stylised figure of a woman wearing a long dress or mantle fastened on the breast by a large brooch.

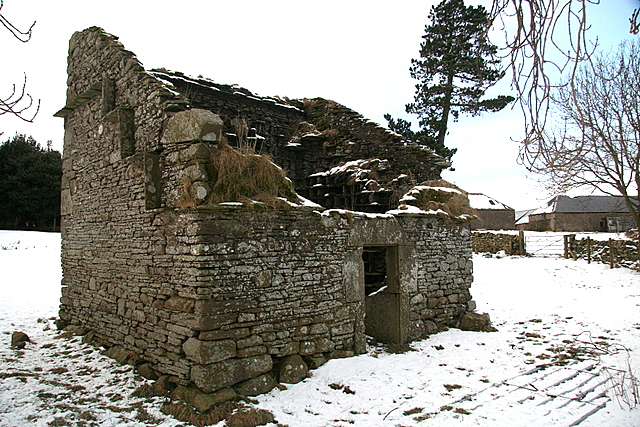
Wester Denoon Doocot

== See also ==
- Ark Hill
- Sidlaw Hills
