= Poolewe Stone =

Pictish artifact discovered in Scotland

Coordinates: 57°46′1″N 5°36′20″W

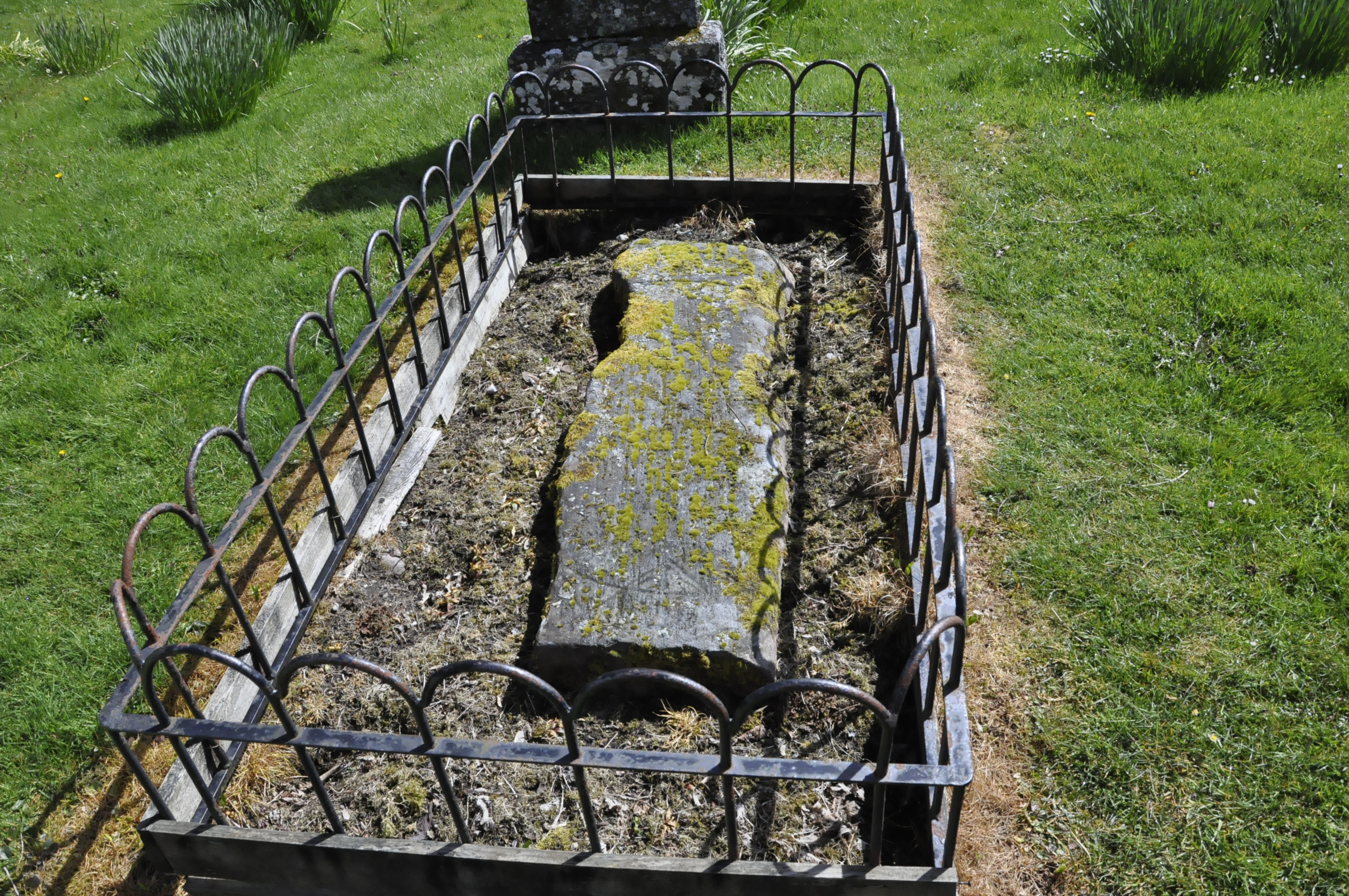
Poolewe Stone at the graveyard of Poolewe

The Poolewe Stone is a Class-I Pictish stone discovered in 1992 in the cemetery at Poolewe (Poll Iùbh) in Wester Ross, Scotland. The stone carries the common Pictish depictions of a crescent and v-rod. Chiseled inside the crescent are some hollows and two spirals meeting to form a pelta. Today the stone lies in the church yard.
