= Angus Folk Museum =

Museum in Angus, Scotland

Coordinates: 56.6095°N 3.0034°W

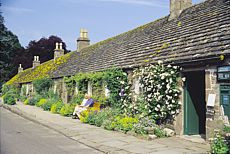
- Established: 1950s
- Dissolved: 2017
- Location: Kirkwynd, Glamis, Angus, Scotland, DD8 1RT

Angus Folk Museum was a centre for agricultural history and rural life located near Forfar, Angus. It was located in the village of Glamis off the A94. The museum was founded by Jean, Lady Maitland who gave her collections to the nation in the 1950s. Since 1976 it has been administered by the National Trust for Scotland. The museum has been described as containing "one of Scotland's finest folk collections".

The museum was housed in a terraced row of six cottages built in 1793 and one farm steading. The buildings were given by Timothy Bowes-Lyon, 16th Earl of Strathmore and Kinghorne to house the museum collections.

It was given a 3 star rating by the Scottish Tourist Board.

The museum closed permanently in 2017 due to structural problems discovered in its buildings. The collection is now housed at the National Trust for Scotland's House of Dun property near Montrose, Angus.
