= List of listed buildings in Coupar Angus, Perth and Kinross =

This is a list of listed buildings in the parish of Coupar Angus in Perth and Kinross, Scotland.

== List ==
Name	Location	Date Listed	Grid Ref. (Note: Sometimes known as OSGB36, the grid reference (where provided) is based on the British national grid reference system used by the Ordnance Survey. • "Guide to National Grid". Ordnance Survey. • "Get-a-map". Ordnance Survey.)	Geo-coordinates	Notes	LB Number (Note: Historic Environment Scotland assign a unique alphanumeric identifier to each designated site in Scotland, for listed buildings this always begins with "LB", for example "LB12345".)	Image
Abbey Churchyard				56°32′38″N 3°15′53″W	Category B	23127	Upload Photo
3 Causewayend				56°32′45″N 3°16′07″W	Category C(S)	23141	Upload Photo
Cumberland (Or Yeomanry Barracks, 2 Calton Street				56°32′46″N 3°16′04″W	Category B	23146	Upload Photo
Union Bank Buildings And Bank House, Calton Street				56°32′50″N 3°15′59″W	Category B	23150	Upload Photo
Keithick House				56°31′56″N 3°17′50″W	Category A	6170	Upload Photo
Arthurstone House, Sundial No. 2 In Front Of Summer-House				56°34′27″N 3°12′13″W	Category C(S)	6159	Upload Photo
Pleasance Farmhouse				56°32′23″N 3°16′00″W	Category C(S)	23132	Upload Photo
"Millburn", George Street				56°32′41″N 3°16′08″W	Category B	23139	Upload Photo
7 Gray Street				56°32′45″N 3°16′06″W	Category B	23142	Upload Photo
Keithick House, Stables And Steading				56°31′59″N 3°18′04″W	Category B	6142	Upload Photo
Wester Balgersho Farmhouse				56°31′48″N 3°16′53″W	Category C(S)	6146	Upload Photo
Viewbank, Farmhouse				56°33′56″N 3°13′26″W	Category C(S)	6151	Upload Photo
Arthurstone House, Summer-House In Walled Garden				56°34′28″N 3°12′13″W	Category C(S)	6158	Upload Photo
Union Street, Town Hall Including Boundary Walls				56°32′49″N 3°15′56″W	Category C(S)	51347	Upload another image
1 Calton Street				56°32′47″N 3°16′04″W	Category C(S)	23148	Upload Photo
"Dalblair", Union Street				56°32′48″N 3°16′00″W	Category C(S)	23151	Upload Photo
"Beech Hill Mansion House", Beech Hill Road				56°32′56″N 3°16′12″W	Category B	23153	Upload Photo
Ardler Manse (Formerly)				56°33′52″N 3°11′48″W	Category B	6167	Upload Photo
Keithick South Lodge				56°31′51″N 3°17′20″W	Category B	6143	Upload Photo
Bridge Of Couttie				56°33′09″N 3°17′07″W	Category B	6148	Upload Photo
Larghan House				56°33′09″N 3°15′27″W	Category B	6149	Upload Photo
Isla Park				56°33′22″N 3°14′44″W	Category B	6150	Upload Photo
Y.W.C.A., Union Street, Former Original Secession Church				56°32′45″N 3°16′02″W	Category B	23134	Upload Photo
Masonic Buildings (St. John Operative No. 105), Gray Street				56°32′45″N 3°16′05″W	Category B	23143	Upload Photo
"Princeland", Blairgowrie Road				56°33′04″N 3°16′00″W	Category B	23152	Upload Photo
Keithick, North Lodge				56°32′08″N 3°18′25″W	Category B	6169	Upload Photo
Arthurstone House, Sundial No. 3 In Front Of Greenhouse				56°34′28″N 3°12′10″W	Category B	6160	Upload Photo
Arthurstone House Castle Folly And Greenhouse				56°34′28″N 3°12′10″W	Category B	6161	Upload Photo
Arthurstone House, Dovecot				56°34′28″N 3°12′04″W	Category B	6163	Upload Photo
Arthurstone House, Sundial No. 1 At S.E. Front Of House				56°34′21″N 3°12′13″W	Category B	5707	Upload Photo
Royal Hotel, High Street And 2 George Street (Formerly Defiance Inn And Assembly Rooms)				56°32′43″N 3°16′03″W	Category B	23138	Upload Photo
2 Hay Street				56°32′47″N 3°16′05″W	Category B	23145	Upload Photo
"Aviemore", Calton Street				56°32′49″N 3°16′01″W	Category C(S)	23149	Upload Photo
Keithick House Sundial				56°32′00″N 3°17′58″W	Category C(S)	6141	Upload Photo
Kemphill, Farmhouse				56°32′39″N 3°17′33″W	Category C(S)	6144	Upload Photo
Kinloch House, (Now Hotel)				56°35′07″N 3°11′38″W	Category B	6154	Upload Photo
Cistercian Abbey, Remains Of, Queen Street				56°32′35″N 3°15′52″W	Category B	23125	Upload another image
The Steeple, Queen Street				56°32′41″N 3°15′59″W	Category B	23128	Upload another image
18, 20, 22 Commercial Street				56°32′46″N 3°16′04″W	Category C(S)	23144	Upload Photo
4, 6 Calton Street				56°32′47″N 3°16′03″W	Category B	23147	Upload Photo
"Gartloch Bank", Bogside Road				56°32′52″N 3°16′28″W	Category B	23154	Upload Photo
Kinloch House, Steading				56°35′04″N 3°11′45″W	Category B	6152	Upload Photo
Abbey Church, Parish Church Of Coupar Angus, Queen Street				56°32′38″N 3°15′53″W	Category B	23126	Upload another image
Strathmore Hotel, Queen Street				56°32′42″N 3°16′00″W	Category B	23129	Upload Photo
"Klydon House", Union Street				56°32′45″N 3°15′59″W	Category B	23133	Upload Photo
N.E. Corner, The Cross, Commercial Street And Union Street (Formerly 1 Commercial Street)				56°32′44″N 3°16′02″W	Category C(S)	23136	Upload Photo
Ardler Churchyard, Carmichael Enclosure				56°33′49″N 3°11′50″W	Category C(S)	6166	Upload Photo
Kemphill, Steading				56°32′39″N 3°17′25″W	Category C(S)	6145	Upload Photo
Kinloch House, Walled Garden And Sundial				56°35′07″N 3°11′40″W	Category B	6153	Upload Photo
Arthurstone House, 'Antiquarian Corner' At N.W. Corner Of Walled Garden				56°34′27″N 3°12′14″W	Category B	6162	Upload Photo
Ardler Church				56°33′49″N 3°11′52″W	Category B	6164	Upload another image
Abbeyhill, Precinct Street				56°32′35″N 3°16′00″W	Category B	23130	Upload Photo
S.E. Corner, The Cross, High Street And Union Street				56°32′44″N 3°16′02″W	Category C(S)	23135	Upload Photo
3 Commercial Street				56°32′45″N 3°16′03″W	Category B	23137	Upload Photo
Ardler Churchyard, Railings And Gates				56°33′49″N 3°11′52″W	Category C(S)	6165	Upload Photo
Ardler (Formerly Washington) School				56°33′49″N 3°11′50″W	Category C(S)	6168	Upload Photo
Balgersho House				56°31′55″N 3°16′02″W	Category B	6147	Upload Photo
Arthurstone House				56°34′21″N 3°12′14″W	Category B	6155	Upload Photo
Arthurstone House, Ice-House				56°34′23″N 3°12′14″W	Category C(S)	6156	Upload Photo
Arthurstone House, Walled Garden				56°34′27″N 3°12′09″W	Category C(S)	6157	Upload Photo

== Key ==
The scheme for classifying buildings in Scotland is:

- Category A: "buildings of national or international importance, either architectural or historic; or fine, little-altered examples of some particular period, style or building type."
- Category B: "buildings of regional or more than local importance; or major examples of some particular period, style or building type, which may have been altered."
- Category C: "buildings of local importance; lesser examples of any period, style, or building type, as originally constructed or moderately altered; and simple traditional buildings which group well with other listed buildings."

In March 2016 there were 47,288 listed buildings in Scotland. Of these, 8% were Category A, and 50% were Category B, with the remaining 42% being Category C.
