= Coupar Angus Town Hall =

Municipal building in Coupar Angus, Scotland

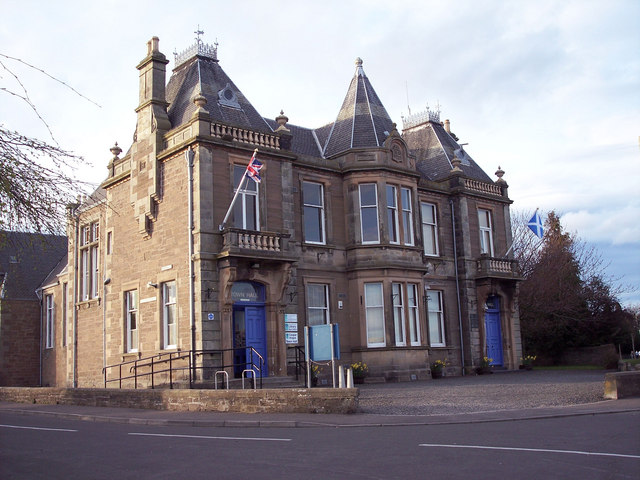
- Coupar Angus Town Hall

- Shown in Perth and Kinross
- 56.5470°N 3.2658°W
- Location: Union Street, Coupar Angus

History
- Built: 1887

Site notes
- Architect: David Smart
- Architectural style: Châteauesque style

Listed Building – Category C(S)
- Official name: Town Hall Including Boundary Walls, Union Street
- Designated: 28 July 2009
- Reference no.: LB51347

Coupar Angus Town Hall is a municipal structure in Union Street in Coupar Angus, Perth and Kinross, Scotland. The structure, which is used as a community events venue and a library, is a Category C listed building.

== History ==
In the 1880s, the burgh council decided to commission a new town hall to celebrate the Golden Jubilee of Queen Victoria. The new building was designed by David Smart of Perth in the Châteauesque style, built in ashlar stone with polished dressings at a cost of £4,000 and was completed in 1887. The design involved a symmetrical main frontage with five bays facing onto Union Street with the end bays projected forward as pavilions; the central bay, which was canted, contained four-part mullioned windows on both floors and was surmounted by a carved frieze, inscribed with a coat of arms and the words "Victoria" and "Building", with a polygon-shaped spire above. The outer bays contained doorways with rectangular fanlights flanked by brackets supporting balustraded balconies; there were French doors on the first floor and balustraded parapets and mansard roofs above. Internally, the principal rooms were the main assembly hall, which featured a hammerbeam roof, and the council chamber, which was on the first floor.

An illuminated roll of honour intended to commemorate the lives of local service personnel who had died in the First World War was initially placed in the local ex-servicemen's club but later transferred to the town hall. A plaque intended to commemorate the hospitality that soldiers of the 1st Medium Artillery Regiment, part of the Polish I Corps, received in the local area during the early years of the Second World War was attached to the main façade of the building and unveiled by the commanding officer of the regiment, Colonel Marian Korewo, on 13 September 1942.

The building continued to serve as the meeting place of the burgh council for much of the 20th century but ceased to be the local seat of government when the enlarged Perth and Kinross District Council was formed in 1975. It subsequently became the meeting place of Coupar Angus, Ardler and Bendochy Community Council and also continued to serve as the home of the local public library. Following completion of a structural survey, Perth and Kinross Council was advised in 2019 that the building needed remedial works expected to cost £600,000 to be carried out. The building was closed in March 2020, because of the COVID-19 pandemic, but subsequently remained closed pending contractors undertaking a programme of essential repairs which were expected to cost £200,000 and to be completed in October 2022.

Works of Art in the town hall include a painting depicting a royal visit to the town undertaken by Queen Victoria in 1844.

== See also ==
- List of listed buildings in Coupar Angus, Perth and Kinross
