= Ralph Laing =

Scottish cricketer and administrator

Personal information
- Full name: John Ralph Laing
- Born: 27 August 1942 (age 84); Meigle, Perthshire, Scotland
- Batting: Left-handed
- Relatives: Gordon Laing (brother)

Domestic team information
- Years: Team
- 1969–1979: Scotland

Career statistics
| Competition | First-class |
|---|---|
| Matches | 8 |
| Runs scored | 301 |
| Batting average | 21.50 |
| 100s/50s | 1/– |
| Top score | 127* |
| Catches/stumpings | 6/– |
- Source: Cricinfo, 19 June 2022

John Ralph Laing (born 27 August 1942) is a Scottish former first-class cricketer and administrator.

Laing was born at Meigle in August 1942. He was educated at Alyth School. A club cricketer for Perthshire County Cricket Club, Laing made his debut for Scotland in first-class cricket against Warwickshire at Edgbaston in 1969. He played first-class cricket for Scotland until 1979, having made eight appearances. In these he scored 301 runs at an average of 21.50, with a highest score of 217 not out coming against Ireland in 1976. Laing was later appointed president of the Scottish Cricket Union in 1992. Outside of cricket, Laing was a potato merchant. His brother, Gordon, was also a first-class cricketer.
