= Milton of Ogilvie =

Coordinates: 56.582040°N 3.007666°W

- Location within Angus
- OS grid reference: NO382438
- Council area: Angus
- Lieutenancy area: Angus
- Country: Scotland
- Sovereign state: United Kingdom
- Post town: FORFAR
- Postcode district: DD8
- Dialling code: 01307
- Police: Scotland
- Fire: Scottish
- Ambulance: Scottish
- UK Parliament: Angus
- Scottish Parliament: Angus South

Milton is a hamlet in Angus, Scotland situated near Glamis. Considerable early history is in the general area including Glamis Castle and the Eassie Stone, a carved Pictish stone dating prior to the Early Middle Ages.

== See also ==
- Charleston
- Sidlaw Hills
