= Mile Hill (Marilyn) =

Mountain (410m) in Angus, Scotland

Coordinates: 56°42′3″N 3°7′34″W

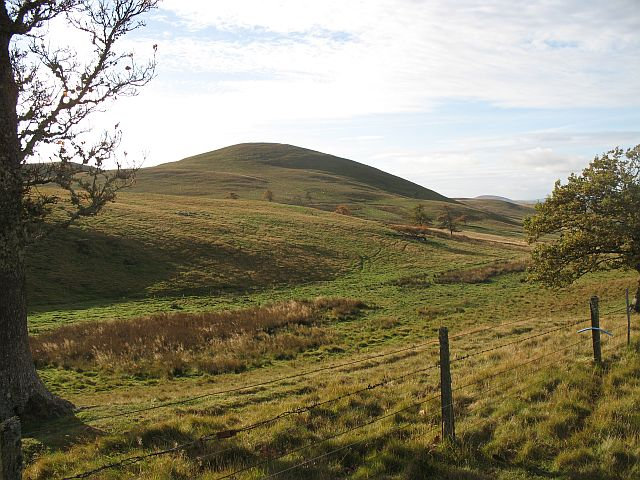
Mile Hill seen from the north east

Mile Hill is a hill in Angus, Scotland, lying about 2 miles north west of Kirkton of Kingoldrum and a similar distance north east of Bridgend of Lintrathen. It has an elevation of 410 m (1,350 ft) and a prominence of 145 m (476 ft) and is classed as a Marilyn.
