= Synod of Rome (721) =

The Synod of Rome (721) (also known as the Council of Rome of 721) was a synod held in St. Peter’s Basilica under the authority of Pope Gregory II to establish canons to improve church discipline.

== Background ==
On April 5, 721, Pope Gregory II opened a synod to deal with tightening up the rules of matrimony, and a number of minor offenses committed against the Church. Present along with the Pope were nineteen Italian bishops, and three non-Italian bishops: Sindered of Toledo, Sedulius from Britain, and Fergustus Pictus from Scotland. Also present were a number of Roman priests and deacons.

== The seventeen canons of the synod ==
The synod drew up seventeen canons to improve church discipline. These included a prohibition on marrying:

- 1. The widow of a priest;
- 2. Or a Deaconess;
- 3. Or a nun;
- 4. Or his spiritual Commater;
- 5. The wife of his brother;
- 6. Or his niece;
- 7. His stepmother or daughter-in-law;
- 8. His first cousin;
- 9. Or a relation, or the wife of a relation.

It further placed anathemas on:

- 10. A man marrying a widow;
- 11. A man who ravishes a virgin to whom he was not betrothed, in order to take her as his wife, even if she were to consent;
- 12. If a man is guilty of superstitious usages;
- 13. Anyone who violates the earlier commands of the Apostolic Church in regard to the olive-yards belonging to it.

It mentioned specific anathemas against:

- 14. Hadrian, who married the deaconess Epiphania;
- 15. As well as Epiphania herself;
- 16. And whoever helped her to marry.

Finally, the synod also anathematized:

- 17. Any cleric who lets his hair grow.

The synod finished its deliberations on the same day it started.
