= St Orland's Stone =

Cross slab in Angus, Scotland

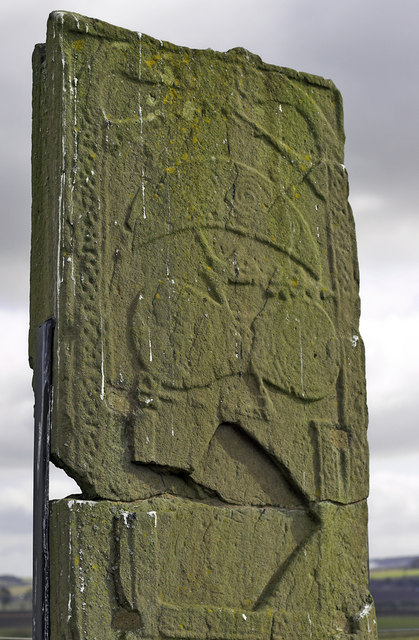
- St Orland's Stone in 2006
- Material: Old Red Sandstone
- Height: 2.4 metres (7.9 ft)
- Symbols: Celtic cross; Pictish beasts; Crescent and v-rod; Double disc and z-rod
- Present location: Angus, Scotland
- Coordinates: 56.6382°N 2.9785°W
- Classification: Class II
- Culture: Picto-Scottish

Designations

Scheduled monument
- Official name: St Orland's Stone
- Type: Crosses and carved stones: cross slab
- Designated: 16 November 1923
- Reference no.: SM90270

St Orland's Stone (otherwise known as the Cossans stone or the Cossins stone) is a Class II Pictish Cross-Slab at Cossans, near Kirriemuir and Forfar, Angus, Scotland.

== Location ==
The cross-slab stands in situ, approximately 3 kilometres (1.9 mi) south-west of the A926 road at its midpoint between Kirriemuir and Forfar (grid reference NO40085002) in the former parish of Glamis.

== Description ==
The stone is a worked slab of Old Red Sandstone, 2.4 metres (7 ft 10 in) tall 0.7 metres (2 ft 4 in) wide and 0.25 metres (9.8 in) wide. The slab is carved on both faces in relief and, as it bears Pictish symbols, it falls into John Romilly Allen and Joseph Anderson's classification system as a class II stone.

The cross face bears a ringed Celtic cross decorated with interlaced knotwork and spiral designs. It is surrounded in the lower two quadrants by interlaced fantastic beasts. The border appears to have once borne knotwork designs, but is weathered and difficult to interpret.

The rear face bears crescent and v-rod and double disc and z-rod Pictish symbols. Below this is what appears to be a hunting scene, with four horsemen accompanied by two hounds, below this is a boat loaded with passengers and a depiction of a fantastic beast facing or attacking a bull. A quadrangular section between the Pictish symbols and figural carving is missing, and appears to have been cut out or a previously inlaid section has been removed. The carving is bordered by interlaced knotwork.

At some point, the stone has been broken and has been repaired using iron staples, formerly on the faces of the stone, now on the edges, to reinforce it.
