= Mill Hill (disambiguation) =

Mill Hill is a place in the London Borough of Barnet

Mill Hill may also refer to:

== Places ==
=== United Kingdom ===
- See List of United Kingdom locations: Mill
- Mill Hill (ward), a ward in Barnet, London
- Mill Hill, Barnes, a street in Barnes, London

=== United States ===
- Mill Hill, Trenton, New Jersey, a neighborhood in Trenton, New Jersey
- Mill Hill (Concord, North Carolina), historic house, home of master builder Jacob Stirewalt, listed on the U.S. National Register of Historic Places
- Mill Hill Historic Park, a museum complex in Norwalk, Connecticut

== Railway stations in the UK ==
- Mill Hill Broadway railway station, on the Thameslink commuter line in Mill Hill, North London
- Mill Hill East tube station, terminus of the single track branchline of the Northern line in North London
- Mill Hill (The Hale) railway station, a former station on the Edgware, Highgate and London Railway in Mill Hill, North London and an unbuilt London Underground station
- Mill Hill (Lancashire) railway station, in the Mill Hill area of Blackburn
- Mills Hill railway station, near Chadderton, Greater Manchester

== Ships ==
- SS Gracechurch, a cargo steamship built in 1930, renamed SS Peebles in 1933, renamed SS Mill Hill in 1936 and torpedoed in 1940
- SS Samdon, a Liberty ship built in 1943, renamed SS Mill Hill in 1947 and renamed SS London Vendor in 1949

== Other ==
- Mill Hill Missionaries, a society of Catholic missionaries founded in 1866
