= Barnes Common =

Organization and common land in London

Coordinates: 51.470154°N 0.237007°W

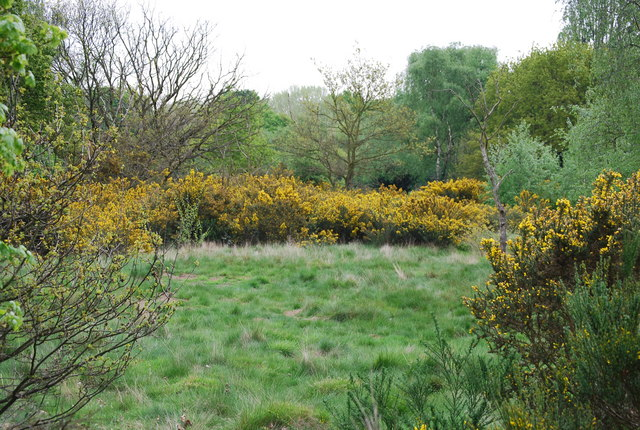
- Broom on Barnes Common
- Interactive map of Barnes Common
- Type: Common land
- Location: Barnes, London
- Area: 49.55 hectares (122.4 acres)
- Open: All year
- Status: Local Nature Reserve

Barnes Common Limited
- Legal status: Not-for-profit membership organisation
- Headquarters: Barnes Common, Barnes, London SW13 0HT
- Main organ: On the Common (newsletter)
- Affiliations: affiliated to Barnes Community Association and associated with the South West London Environment Network
- Staff: none
- Website: barnescommon.org.uk

Barnes Common is a local nature reserve on common land in the south east of Barnes, London, England, adjoining Putney Lower Common to the east and bounded to the south by the Upper Richmond Road. Along with Barnes Green, it is one of the largest zones of common land in London with 49.55 hectares (122.4 acres) of protected commons. It is also a local nature reserve. Facilities include a full-size football pitch and a nature trail.

The common is made up of mixed broadleaf woodland, scrubland and acid grassland and is generally flat. It is owned by the Dean and Chapter of St Paul's Cathedral, acting through the Church Commissioners, and managed by the London Borough of Richmond upon Thames, advised and assisted by the charity Barnes Common Limited (previously known as Friends of Barnes Common).

Mill Hill is effectively an enclave of eleven large houses (three of them listed buildings), surrounded by the Common.

== Transport ==
Barnes railway station is just within the common. The common is served by London Buses routes 33, 72, 265 and 485.

== History ==
=== Death of Marc Bolan ===
Singer and rock musician Marc Bolan died on the common on 16 September 1977 when the car carrying him as a passenger slammed into a tree, at what is now Marc Bolan's Rock Shrine. He was found unconscious in the wreckage of the purple Mini, which, driven by his girlfriend, Gloria Jones, failed to navigate a small humpback bridge, near Gipsy Lane on Queens Ride, Barnes, south-west London, lost control and struck a steel-reinforced chain link fence post, and he was pronounced dead at the scene on the arrival of paramedics near the post located in the woods. Jones was critically injured but was conscious after the crash and survived.

=== Cricket match ===
In August 1736, the common hosted a cricket match between Surrey and London. This is the only time that a reference to the common is found in surviving cricket records.

== Literature ==
Barnes Common is the site of the discovery of a meteorite in Virginia Woolf's short story 'Solid Objects'.

Parts of the common are the setting for Jilly Cooper's diaries, published in 1984 as The Common Years.
