= Fergustus Pictus =

8th-century Scoto-Pictish bishop

Fergustus Pictus or Fergus the Pict was a Scoto-Pictish bishop who is recorded as attending a council organized by Pope Gregory II in 721. He is recorded as "Fergustus episcopus Scotiae Pictus", or "Fergus the Pict, Bishop of Ireland". He is often identified with the Scottish Saint Fergus, and with the Fregus of the Vita Sancti Kentigerni, but the only evidence for this is the name, a name which, either as Fergus or Urgust, just happened to be one of the most popular names in the Scotland and Ireland of the Dark Ages.
