= Gordon Laing (cricketer) =

Scottish cricketer

Personal information
- Full name: James Gordon Brodie Laing
- Born: 10 January 1938 (age 88); Meigle, Perthshire, Scotland
- Batting: Right-handed
- Relatives: Ralph Laing (brother)

Domestic team information
- Years: Team
- 1964–1974: Scotland

Career statistics
Competition	First-class
Matches	19
Runs scored	655
Batting average	23.39
100s/50s	–/3
Top score	93
Catches/stumpings	11/–
- Source: Cricinfo, 24 October 2022

James Gordon Brodie Laing (born 10 January 1938) is a Scottish former first-class cricketer.

Laing was born in January 1938 at Meigle, Perthshire. He was educated at Alyth School. A club cricketer for Perthshire County Cricket Club, he made his debut in first-class cricket for Scotland against Warwickshire at Edgbaston during Scotland's 1964 tour of England. He played first-class for Scotland until 1974, making nineteen appearances. Playing as a top order batsman, Laing scored 655 runs at an average of 23.39; he made three half centuries, with a highest score of 93. His brother, Ralph, was also a first-class cricketer.
