= Invereen Stone =

Pictish Stone Unearthed Near Invereen, Inverness, Scotland

Coordinates: 57.3545°N 4.0011°W

The Invereen Stone
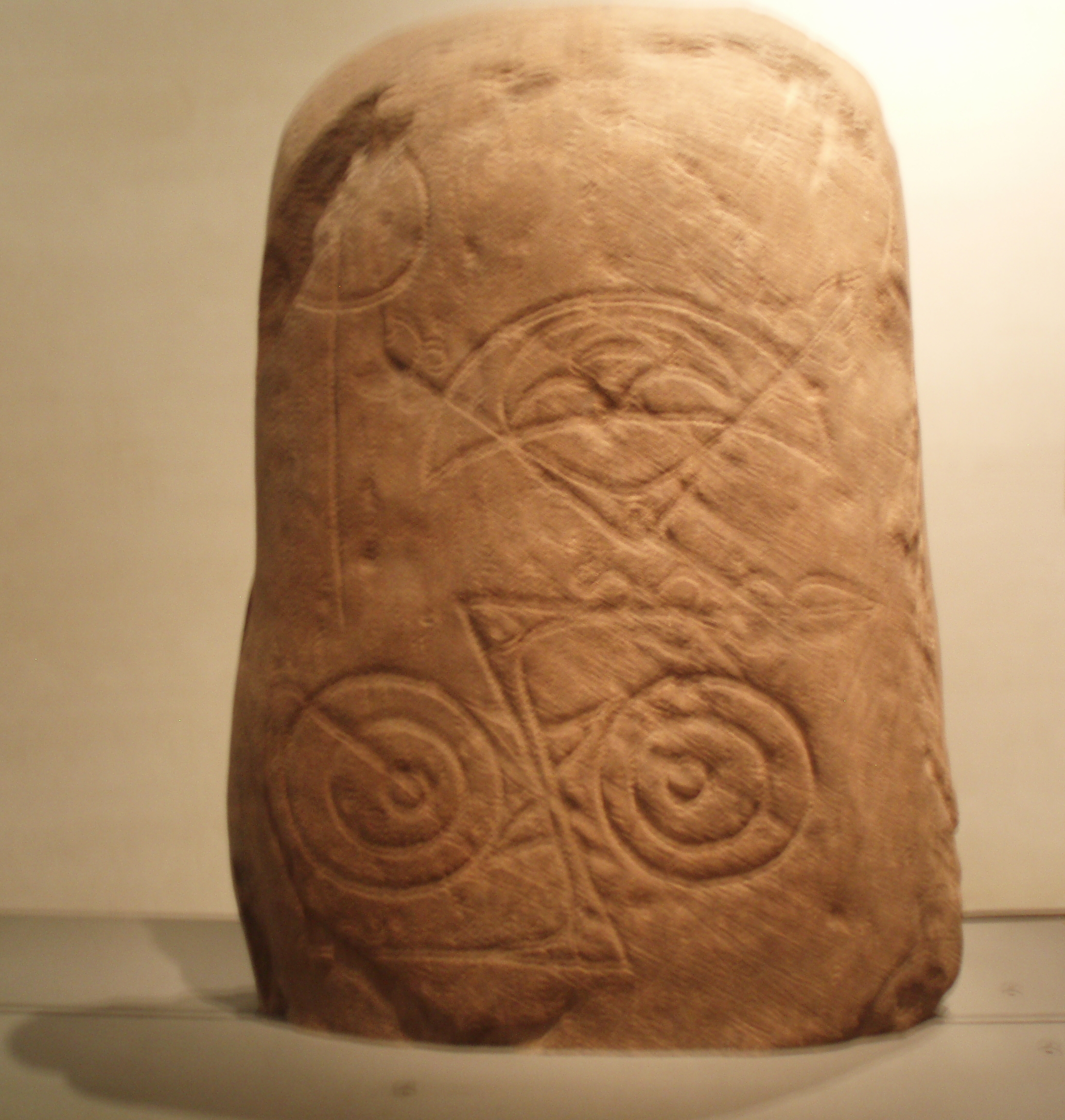
- The Invereen Stone on display in the National Museums of Scotland
- Material: Old Red Sandstone
- Height: 1.0 metre (3.3 ft)
- Symbols: Crescent and v-rod; Double disc and z rod
- Created: Seventh century CE
- Discovered: 1932
- Place: near Invereen, Moy, Scotland
- Present location: National Museums of Scotland, Edinburgh, Scotland
- Classification: Type I
- Culture: Picto-Scottish

The Invereen Stone is a Class I incised Pictish stone that was unearthed near Invereen, Inverness in 1932. It is now on display at the National Museums of Scotland, Edinburgh, Scotland.

== Description ==
The stone is of light red sandstone, 1.0 metre (3.3 ft) high, 0.8 metres (2.6 ft) wide and 0.15 metres (0.49 ft) deep. It was unearthed in 1932 by a Mr. A. Dunbar near Invereen (grid reference NH797311) while ploughing. The stone bears a crescent and v-rod symbol and a double disc and z-rod, with a third design of a circle and line, possibly being later in date.
