= Charleston, Angus =

Village in Angus, Scotland

Coordinates: 56.598208°N 3.008096°W

Charleston
- Location within Angus
- OS grid reference: NO382456
- Council area: Angus
- Lieutenancy area: Angus
- Country: Scotland
- Sovereign state: United Kingdom
- Post town: FORFAR
- Postcode district: DD8
- Dialling code: 01307
- Police: Scotland
- Fire: Scottish
- Ambulance: Scottish
- UK Parliament: Angus
- Scottish Parliament: Angus

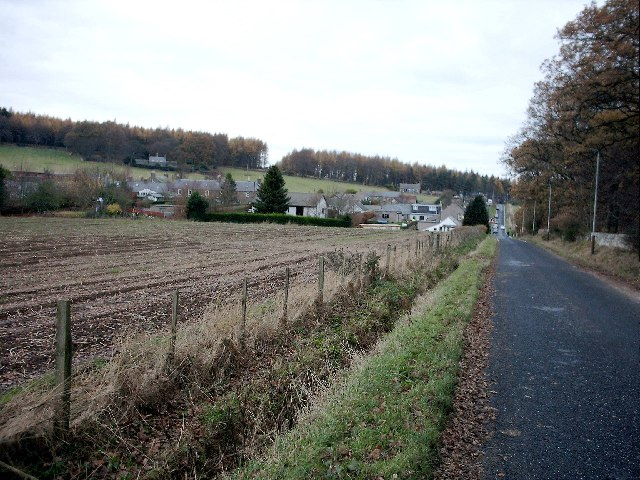
View from the south

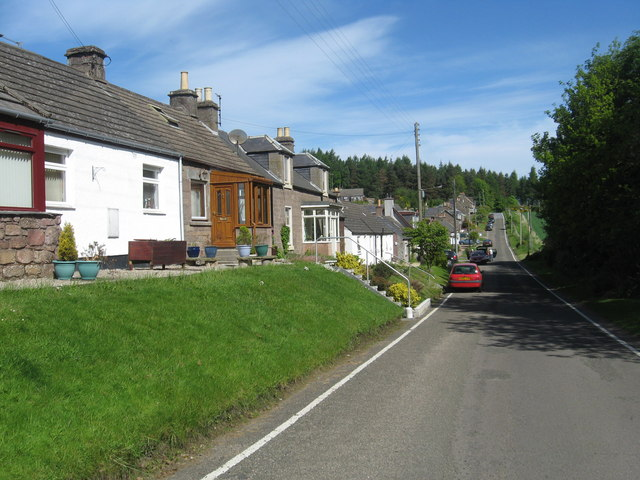
Front Row

Charleston is a village in Angus, Scotland, near Glamis.

The village of Charleston came into being in the 1830s. In 1833, the proprietor of the lands of Rochelhill granted a long tack of land to Alexander Bruce, a hand loom weaver in Glamis, and this land was subsequently, in 1838, feued at a rate of £8 per acre. At least 50 houses were then built, and the village was named Charleston after the proprietor of Rochelhill, Charles Henderson.

At that time, there were four main proprietors in the parish of Glamis. The Earl of Strathmore owned the greater part of the land, covering the northern and central areas, while the property belonging to Lord Douglas occupied the Glen of Ogilvie. The estate of Rochelhill lay at the foot of Glen Ogilvie, between the Strathmore and Douglas estates. The Brigtown estate, owned by William Douglas, lay at the eastern side of the central division. In the autumn of 1859, William Henderson, then proprietor of Rochelhill and son of Charles Henderson, sold the lands of Easter and Wester Rochelhill to the Earl of Strathmore for the sum of £18,000.

In 1845, it was noted that the village of Charleston had 230 inhabitants, a number that was fast increasing. The occupants of the village were largely hand loom weavers, working industriously in their cottages in addition to their normal working hours, weaving coarse brown linen, the yarn for which was spun in the mill at Glamis.

For many years, the village of Charleston had a school and schoolhouse, bequeathed by William Henderson to the people of Charleston. The school closed in the 1930s and was later converted into the Village Hall, which remains a valuable resource in the village today, hosting regular events and activities. The hall is also home to a children's playgroup. The group is managed by a committee of volunteer parents and provides day care for up to 22 children between the ages of 2 1/2 years and primary school age, five mornings per week during term time.

William Henderson also bequeathed a bleaching or drying green to the people of Charleston, and this has been converted into a children's playpark. Funding for this was raised by the children of Charleston themselves through the Charleston Village Hall Children's Project. The village hosts an annual bonfire night and fireworks display on 5 November. Contributions to fund the event are gathered by the children on Hallowe'en while guising in the village.

The Charleston Inn, a public house in the village, is now closed and demolished, but was mentioned by Jean Curthoys in the preface to her 1997 book Feminist Amnesia: The Wake of Women's Liberation.

== See also ==
- Eassie Stone
- Glamis Castle
- Milton
- Hunter's Hill Stone
