= Gordon Laing (musician) =

British musician

Gordon Laing (born 1964) is a British classical bassoonist, contrabassoonist, and pedagogue. He studied bassoon at the Redbridge Music School. He later studied at the Royal College of Music with Geoffrey Gambold (bassoon) and John Burness (contra-bassoon), who were principals with the BBC Symphony Orchestra at the time. He was a member of the Orchestra of the Royal Opera House, Covent Garden in 1995, and became Principal Contra-Bassoon with the Philharmonia Orchestra in 1997.

He is Professor of Basson at the Guildhall School of Music & Drama.
