= Kilry Glen =

Valley in Angus, Scotland

Coordinates: 56.6802°N 3.2564°W

Kilry Glen, in Angus, Scotland, is the glen of the Burn of Kilry, a tributary of the River Isla. It is situated west of the B954 road, approximately four miles north of Alyth.

== Area history ==
Considerable evidence of prehistory is apparent in the vicinity; most notably, a number of Pictish stones have been discovered in the general area. Accordingly, one of the largest collections of Pictish Stones in Scotland has been assembled at the Meigle Museum. As further testimony to the Pictish era, not far is the village of Eassie noted for the presence of the Eassie Stone; this carved Pictish stone is dated prior to the Early Middle Ages.

Residents are documented are documented as having served in a number of foreign wars, including the South African War of 1899 to 1902.

== See also ==
- Sidlaws
