= Nevay Church =

16th century church and medieval burial ground in Angus, Scotland

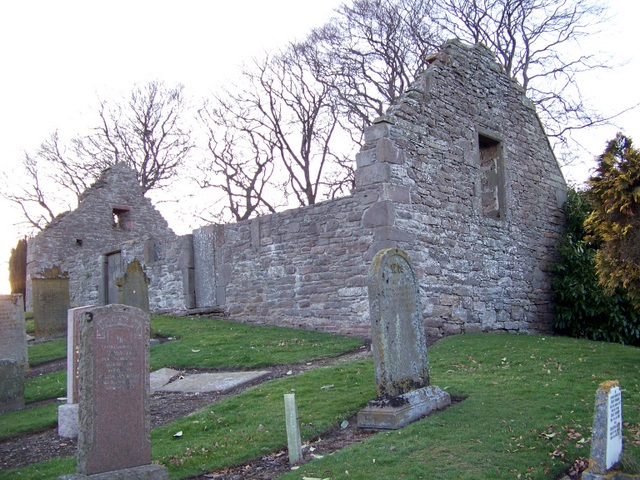
- Nevay church ruins
- Nevay Church
- 56.58391°N 3.12110°W

Scheduled monument
- Official name: Nevay Church
- Type: Ecclesiastical: burial ground, cemetery, graveyard; church
- Designated: 26 November 1971
- Reference no.: SM3002

Nevay Church is a ruined 16th century parish church located near the village of Kirkinch in Angus, Scotland. Originally dedicated to St Neveth, a church has been recorded at this site since the 14th century; however, a round-headed cross-slab found in the church, and now displayed in the Meffan Institute, Forfar, suggests an earlier origin. The building and surrounding cemetery are designated a scheduled monument. Nevay church was abandoned in 1835 when a newer church was built to serve both the Eassie and Nevay Parishes.

== Description ==
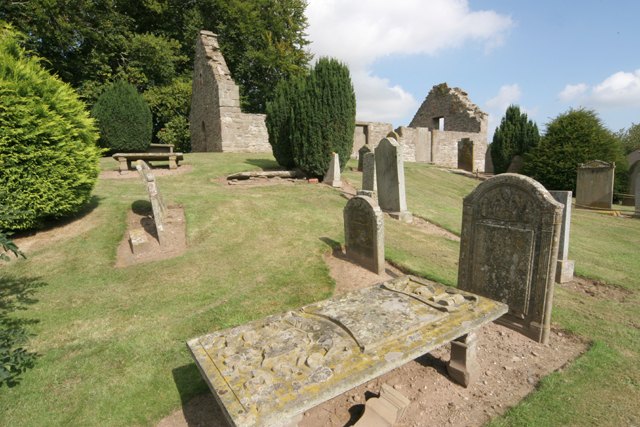
Nevay cemetery

The church is located near the village of Kirkinch, Angus, 150 m (490 ft) east of the Kirkinch Burn. It stands on a raised oval platform and is surrounded by a walled cemetery.

Nevay Church is rectangular in design, measuring 16.3 m (53 ft) x 5.6 m (18 ft). Inside the church, adjacent to the north and south walls are several stone artefacts including gravestones and masonry rubble. The church was constructed in coursed rubble of red and grey sandstone. The gables remain at their original height, and the north and south walls range in height from 1 m (3 ft 3 in) to 2 m (6 ft 7 in). A round-headed arched doorway and small arched window in the west gable may medieval in origin, possibly brought from another location. The south wall contains two doorways now blocked by gravestones. There is a surviving small window set between the two blocked doors.

== History ==
The church of Nevay (dedicated to St Neveth) is on record in the 14th century, and the adjoining burial ground dates to the medieval era. The present structure was built in the late 16th century. The parish of Nevay joined with the parish of Eassie to become one parish in 1660. The lintel of one of the doorwways is engraved with the date 1695. A gravestone built into the church's walls is dated 1597. Around 1835, a new church named the Eassie and Nevay Parish Church was built near the village of Nevay. The old Nevay church was abandoned soon after.

The remains of Nevay Church were designated a scheduled monument in 1971 and the surrounding cemetery was added in 2017. The monument consists of the remains of Nevay Church and its burial grounds, excluding the boundary walls.
