= Glamis =

Coordinates: 56°36′30″N 03°00′13″W

- Location within Angus
- OS grid reference: NO385467
- Council area: Angus
- Lieutenancy area: Angus
- Country: Scotland
- Sovereign state: United Kingdom
- Post town: FORFAR
- Postcode district: DD8
- Dialling code: 01307
- Police: Scotland
- Fire: Scottish
- Ambulance: Scottish
- UK Parliament: Angus and Perthshire Glens
- Scottish Parliament: Angus South

Glamis /ˈɡlɑːmz/ is a small village in Angus, Scotland, located 5 miles (8 km) south of Kirriemuir and 5 miles (8 km) southwest of Forfar. It is the location of Glamis Castle, the childhood home of Queen Elizabeth the Queen Mother.

== History ==
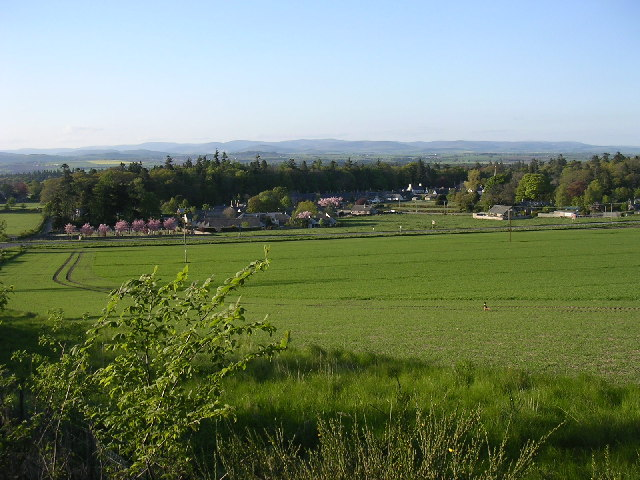
Glamis, with the Grampians beyond

The vicinity of Glamis has prehistoric traces – within the village, there stands an intricately carved Pictish stone known as the Glamis Manse Stone. There are various other Pictish stones nearby the village, such as the Hunter's Hill Stone, and the Eassie Stone, which stands in Eassie Old Church near the village of Eassie. The last Alpínid king of Scotland, Malcolm II, died at Glamis in 1034. Some other small fragments of Pictish stones from Glamis are preserved in the Meffan Institute in Forfar.

On 20 October 1491, James IV declared it a burgh of barony. This gave Glamis the right to hold a weekly market and an annual fair, which was held on 17 November, the feast day of Saint Fergus. This legacy can be seen in the mercat cross, which still stands in the village square.

The humorous poet Agnes Lyon lived in the town.

Glamis was the location of a flax spinning mill, which in 1818 was leased by William Baxter, who later founded the major Dundee textile firm Baxter Brothers & Co Ltd.

== Important buildings ==
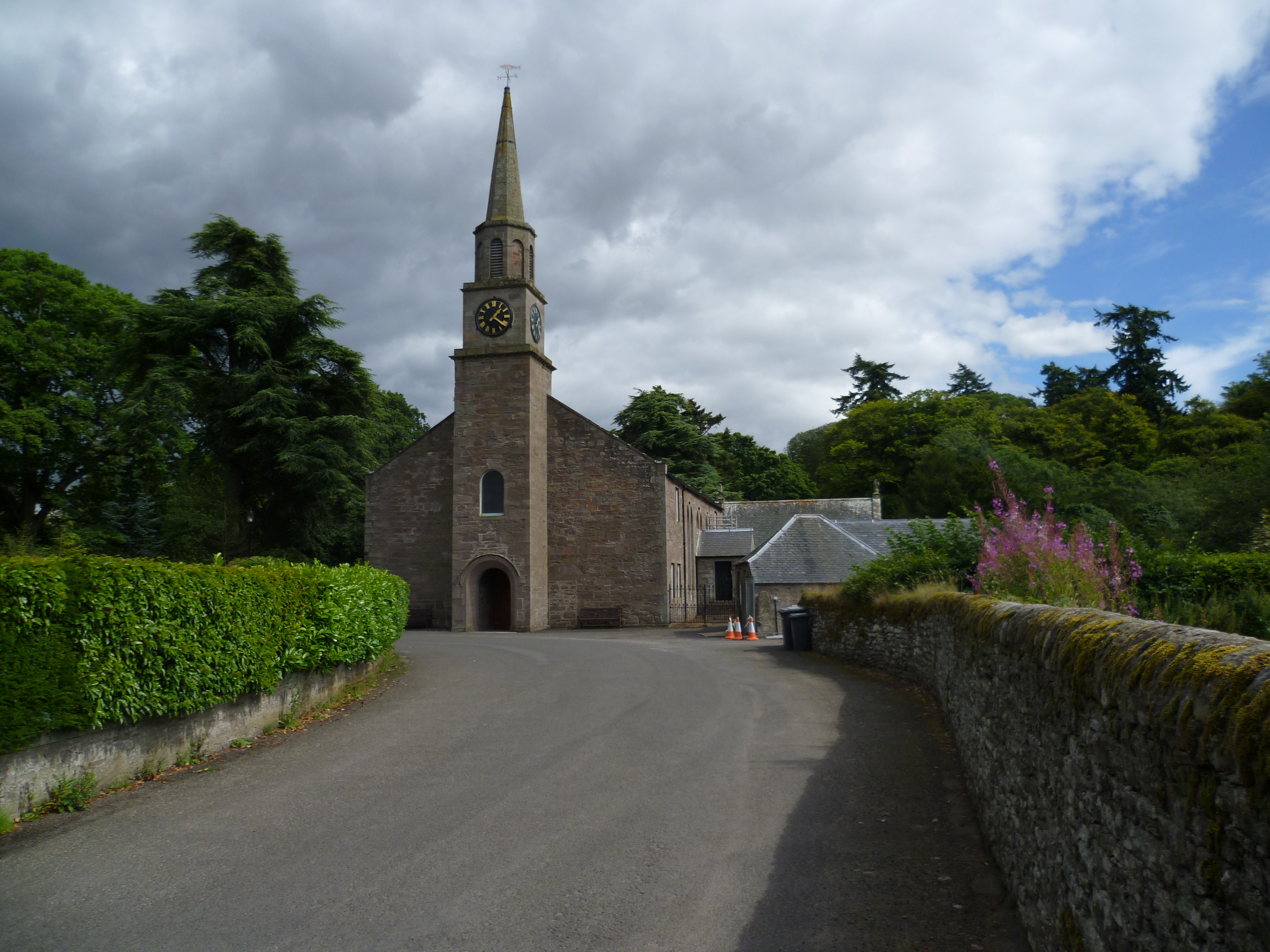
Glamis village church

Glamis is a well-preserved village. Much of its historic core was built to house estate workers in the 18th and 19th centuries. The Angus Folk Museum, run by the National Trust for Scotland, is in the village. It is a museum of days past, recreating scenes of rural life such as a minister's parlour, a schoolroom, a laundry, and an agricultural area, along with displays of tools, everyday artifacts, and old crafts. It is housed in an adapted row of single-storey stone cottages, built in 1793.

The parish church of Glamis, dedicated to Saint Fergus, was founded in the early medieval period (probably 8th century AD). The present building is 18th-century with an interior recast in the 1930s, but retains a vaulted 15th-century aisle from the medieval church which preceded it. The aisle is the burial place (photo) of the Bowes-Lyon family, owners of Glamis Castle. One of its park gates is situated near the parish church.

The castle hosts various events throughout the year, notably the Proms evening, when thousands of people traditionally turn out with picnics ranging from the small to the elaborate.

== In Shakespeare ==
In the tragedy of Macbeth by William Shakespeare, Macbeth is the Thane of Glamis. He later becomes the Thane of Cawdor and the king of Scotland, fulfilling the witches' prophecy.

Several cities in Britain have streets named after Glamis, due to the popularity of naming streets after Shakespearean characters and locations during the Victorian Era.

== See also ==
- Ark Hill
- Castleton
- Charleston
- Eassie Stone
- Glamis Castle
- Lord of Glamis
- Monster of Glamis
- Wester Denoon
