= Mill Hill, Barnes =

Street in Barnes, London

Coordinates: 51°28′10″N 0°14′25″W

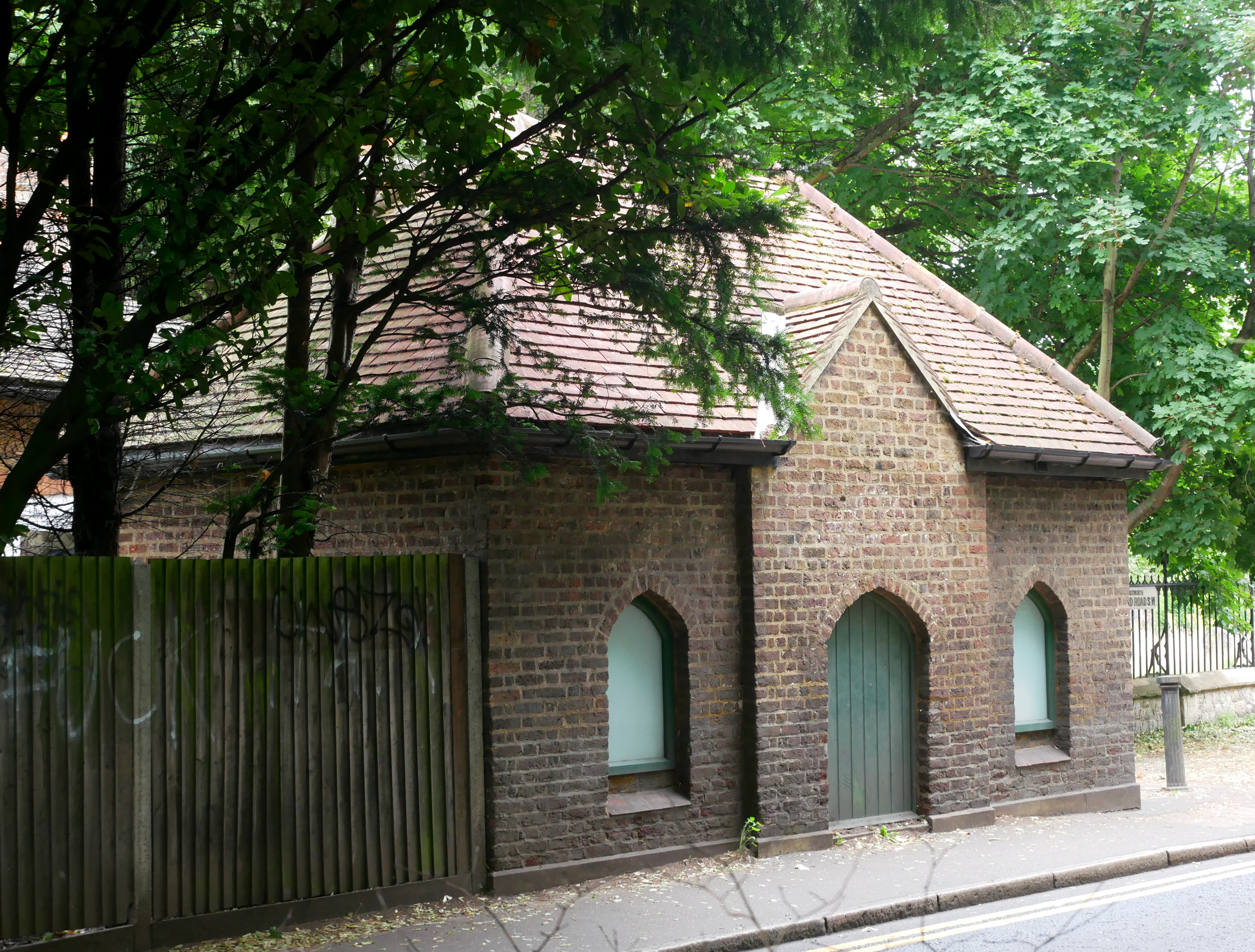
Toll House on nearby Mill Hill Road

Mill Hill is a street in Barnes, London, England. It is off Mill Hill Road in the most elevated location in Barnes, and is effectively an enclave of eleven large houses on the site of a former windmill, surrounded by Barnes Common. Three of the houses are Grade II listed: The Mill Hill, Mill Hill Lodge and Mulberry Lodge.

== History ==
A windmill stood on the site from at least 1443 until the 19th century. In 1780, a hurricane destroyed the Post Mill, and in 1783 the new Smock Mill replaced it. In 1812, the Italian servant who assassinated Louis-Alexandre de Launay, comte d'Antraigues, and his wife at their nearby home in Barnes Terrace was buried nearby.

In 1836, the mill was demolished by the Yewd family to allow for housing development. The houses date from the 19th century, apart from Mill Hill Lodge, part of which is the miller's 18th-century cottage.

In 1902, the sister of Frederick Roberts, 1st Earl Roberts was living at Mill Hill. In 1912, The Mill Hill was home to a Mrs Eykyn.
