= Ark Hill =

Coordinates: 56°34′22″N 3°03′04″W

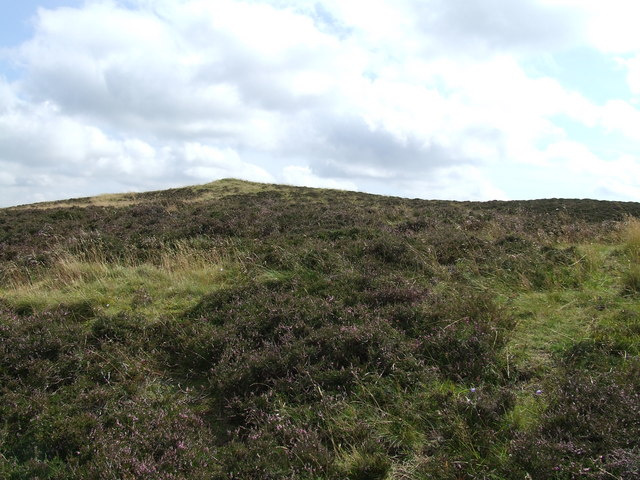

Highest point
- Elevation: 339 m (1,112 ft)
- Prominence: 36 m (118 ft)
- Listing: Marilyn

Geography
- Location: Angus, Scotland
- Parent range: Sidlaw Hills
- Topo map: OS Landranger 53

Climbing
- Easiest route: Walk up to summit

Ark Hill is a mountainous landform within the Sidlaw Hills in Angus, Scotland. This location has been proposed as a windfarm for generating renewable electrical power. Approximately two kilometres to the north is the village of Eassie noted for the presence of the Eassie Stone; this carved Pictish stone is dated prior to the Early Middle Ages.

== See also ==
- Eassie Stone
- Glamis Castle
- Wester Denoon
