= Crescent (Pictish symbol) =

Ancient symbol found on carved stones

The crescent is a Pictish symbol that is found occasionally on its own on Class I and Class II Pictish stones (e.g. the Drosten Stone) but, overlaid with a V-rod, a V-shaped rod resembling a broken arrow, is the most frequently-occurring symbol (roughly 1 in 5). The V-rod never appears on its own and its only other appearance is overlaid on an arch at Migvie. The symbol is found in combination with other symbols, notably with the double disc and z-rod. which is the next most common symbol.

In his Rhind lecture of 14 October 1880 Joseph Anderson said of the crescent and V-rod and of the double-disc and Z-rod:

Bearing in mind that they are Christian, and that it is impossible to give them any older or more restricted attribution, it is plain that there is but one symbol which equals them in importance, if that be judged by the frequency of their occurrence and the universality of their application. That symbol is the cross, the common emblem of the central doctrine of the Christian faith. Whatever may have been the significance attached to these symbols, it could not have been of a trivial or unimportant character. From their prominent place in the system of symbolism, ... their arbitrary significance appears to have been considered ... almost equal to that ... of the cross itself, with which they are so often associated.

This does not mean that the symbols did not predate the adoption of Christianity by the Picts: rather, that after the conversion the symbols acquired Christian meaning which made them suitable for depiction on Christian monuments.

The crescent and V-rod appears as the top panel on the back of the Hilton of Cadboll stone. The back of this stone is now recognised as being composed of Christian symbols. Whatever the crescent and V-rod meant, it was considered by the sculptor of the Hilton stone to be sufficiently exalted to occupy this prominent position above the hunting scene (now recognised as referring to Baptism).

== Gallery ==
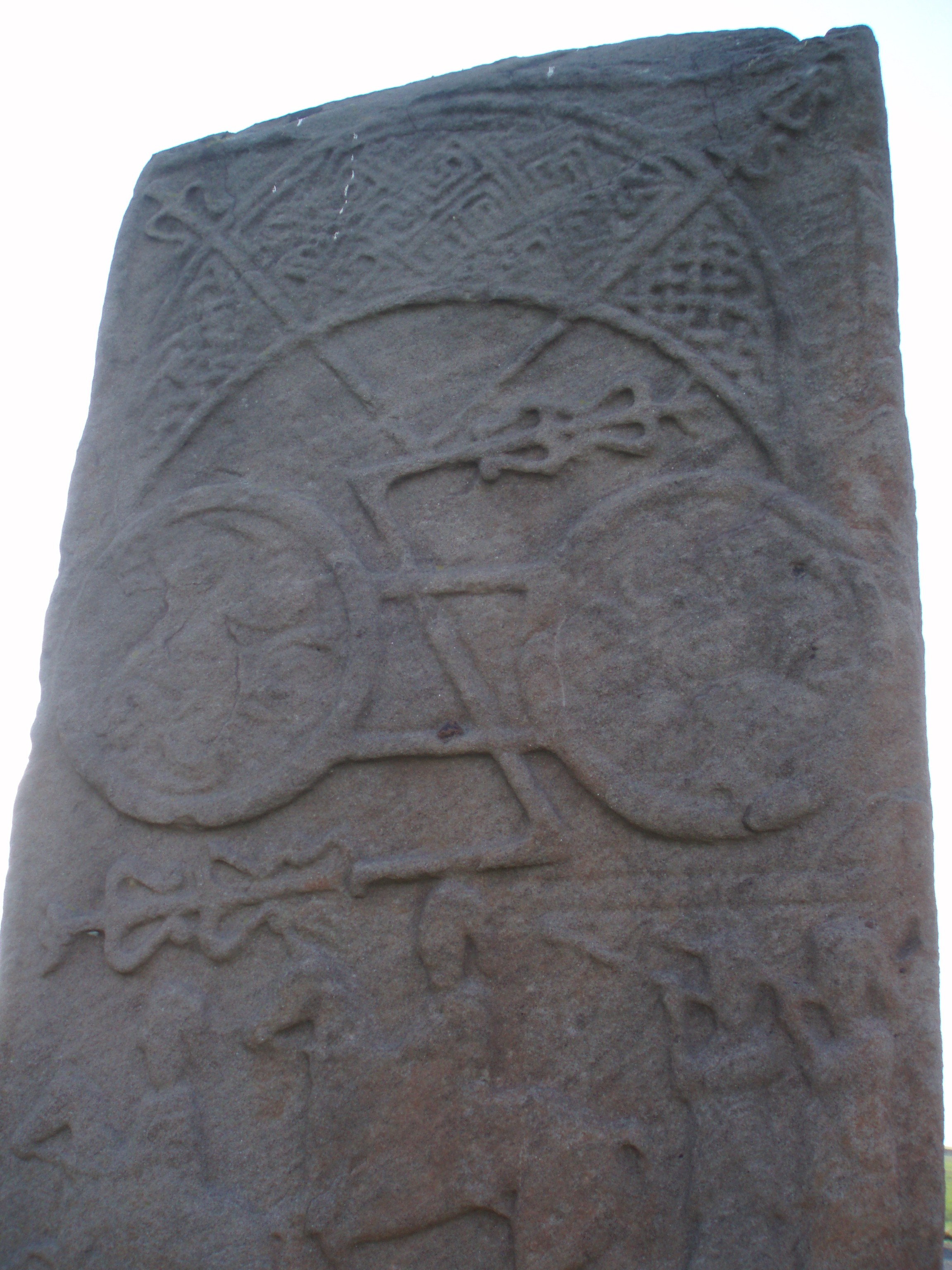
Aberlemno 3 rear face detail; Class II

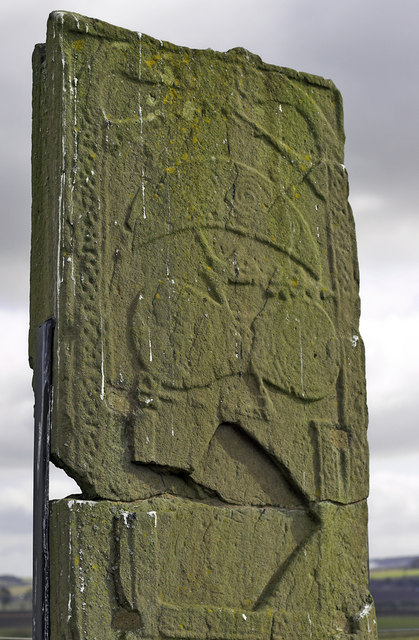
St Orland's Stone

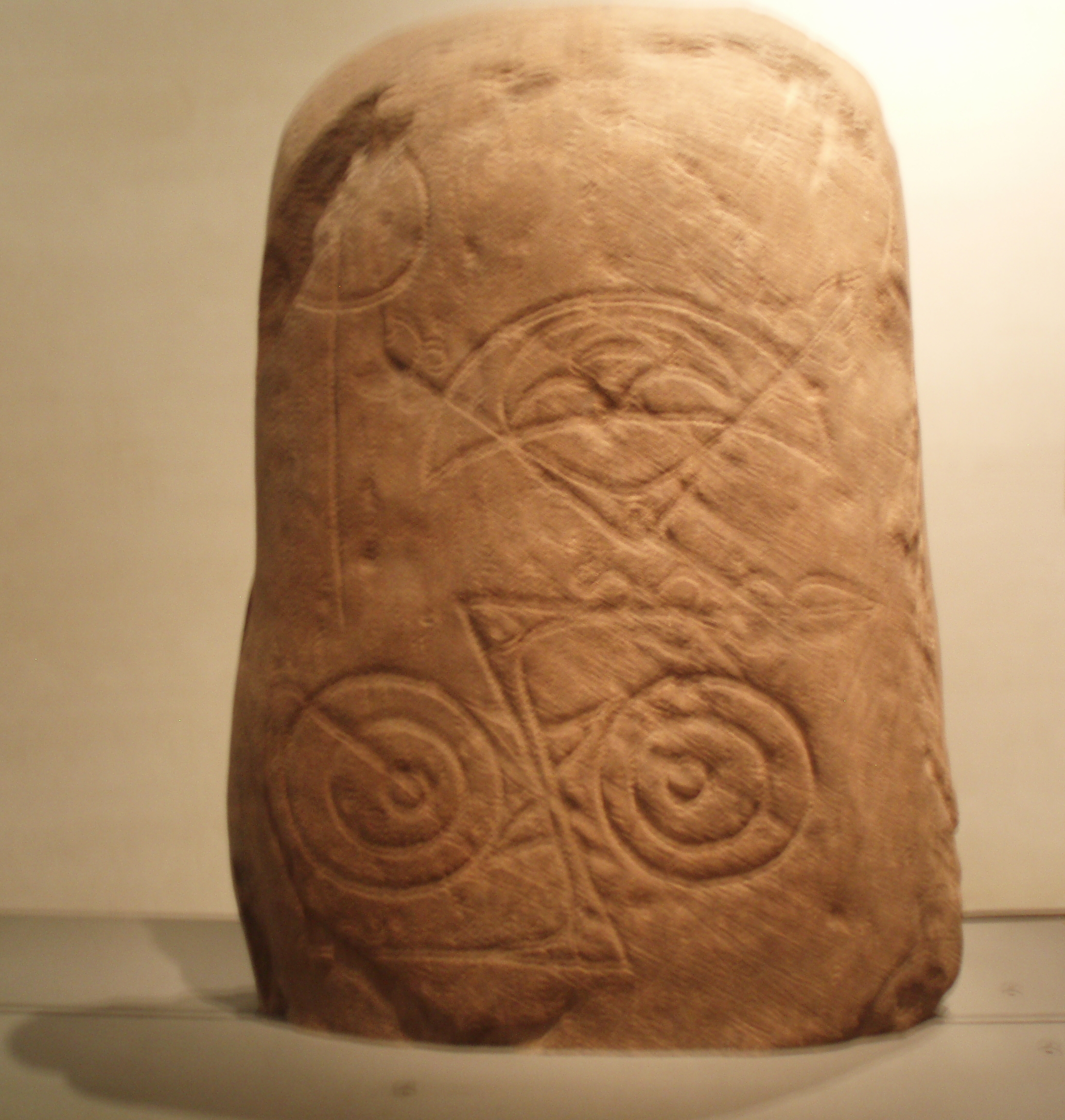
Invereen Stone

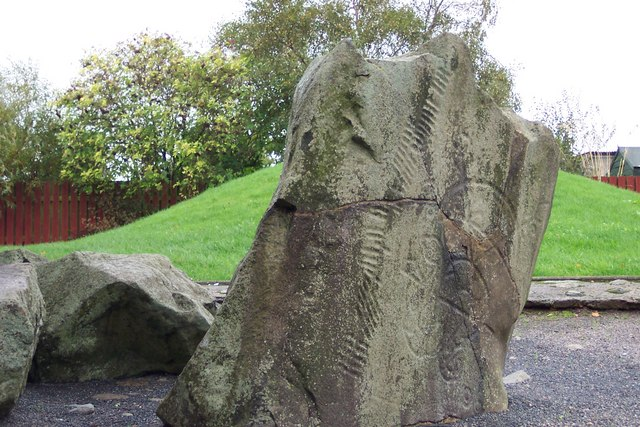
Brandsbutt Stone
