= Mile Hill, Dykehead =

Hill (321m) near Dykehead, Angus, Scotland

Coordinates: 56°43′56″N 3°1′18″W

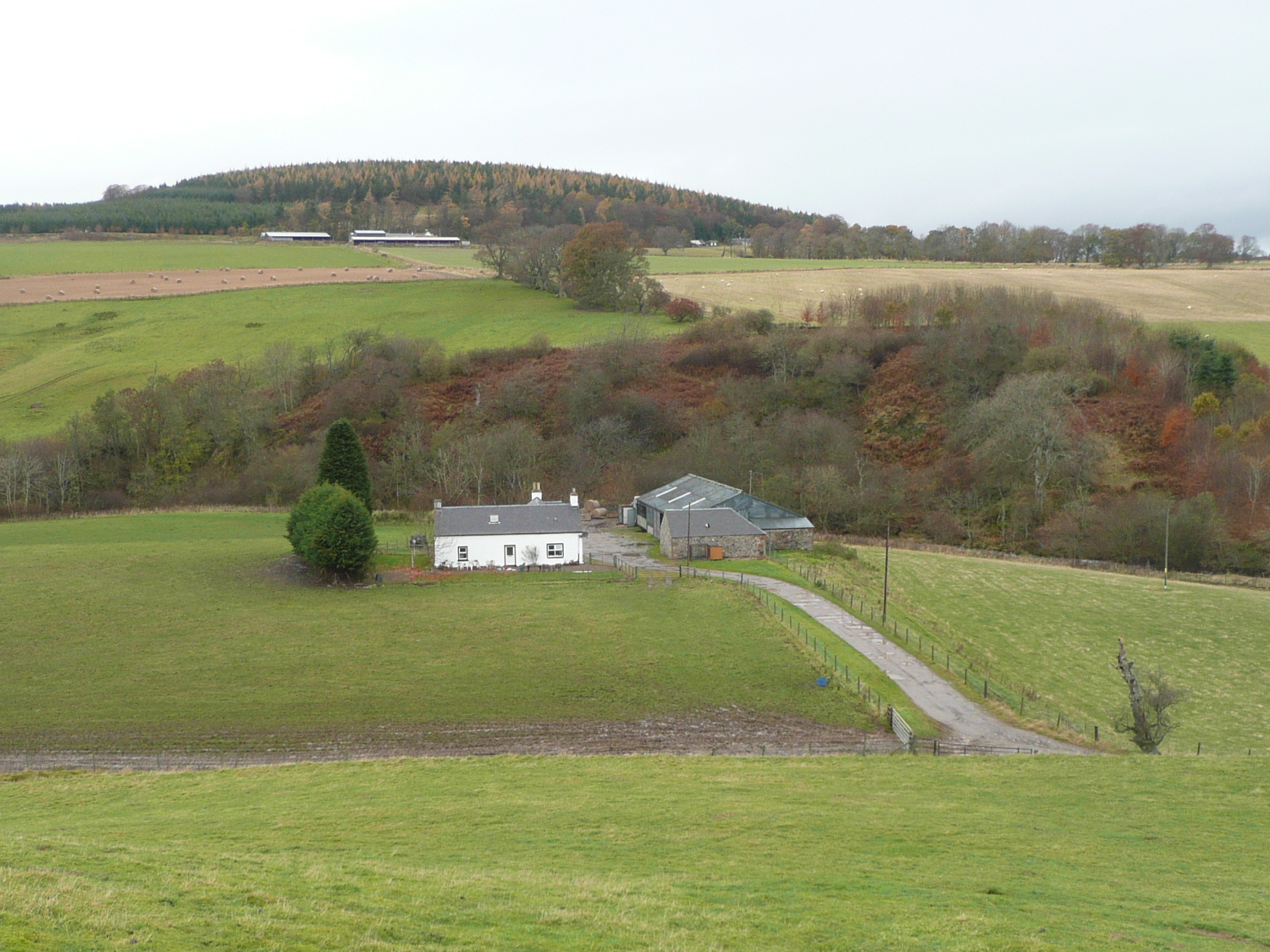
Mile Hill

Mile Hill is located in Angus, Scotland, 1000 metres west of Dykehead. It is a circular hill between Glen Clova and Glen Prosen. It has an elevation of 321 m (1,053 ft) and a prominence of 60 m (200 ft) and is classed as a Tump.
