= A94 road =

Road in Scotland

Coordinates: 56.5582°N 3.2426°W

A94

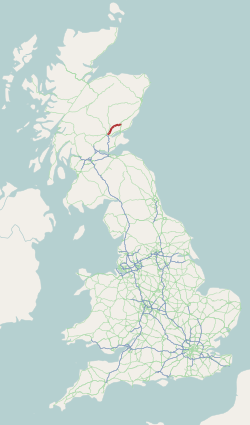

Route information
- Length: 29.2 mi (47.0 km)

Major junctions
- West end: A93 at Perth
- A90 near Forfar
- East end: A926 at Forfar

Location
- Country: United Kingdom
- Constituent country: Scotland
- Council areas: Perth and Kinross, Angus

Road network
- Roads in the United Kingdom; Motorways; A and B road zones
← A93	→ A95

The A94 is a minor road in Scotland, United Kingdom.

== Route ==
The A94 connects Perth to Forfar via Coupar Angus, Meigle and Glamis. Just west of Forfar, the road is connected to the A90 via a grade-separated junction.

== History ==
The A94 route number once extended north via Brechin to Stonehaven, this stretch was renumbered to be part of the A90 in the 1990s.

== Junction list ==
Council area	Location	mi	km	Destinations	Notes
Perth and Kinross	Bridgend	0.0	0.0	Main Street (A93)	Western terminus
Perth and Kinross	Scone	2.4	3.9	A9294 west (New Kingsway) to A9 – Inverness, Perth	Eastern terminus of A9294
Perth and Kinross	Coupar Angus	12.1	19.5	A923 east (Queen Street) – Dundee	Western terminus of A923 concurrency
Perth and Kinross	Coupar Angus	12.4	20.0	A923 west (Blairgowrie Road) – Blairgowrie	Eastern terminus of A923 concurrency
Angus	Glamis	24.1	38.8	A928 south (Dundee Road) to A90 – Dundee, Glamis, Kirriemuir, Milton of Ogilvie	Brief concurrency
Angus		27.7– 28.0	44.6– 45.1	A90 to M90 – Aberdeen, Edinburgh, Perth, Dundee	Junction on A90
Angus	Forfar	29.2	47.0	A926 (Craig O Loch Road / Dundee Loan) / West High Street to A90 / A932 – Town centre, Kirriemuir, Dundee, Perth	Eastern terminus
1.000 mi = 1.609 km; 1.000 km = 0.621 mi: Concurrency terminus

== See also ==
- Glamis Castle
- Eassie Stone
