= Eassie Old Church =

Ruined church and burial ground in Angus, Scotland

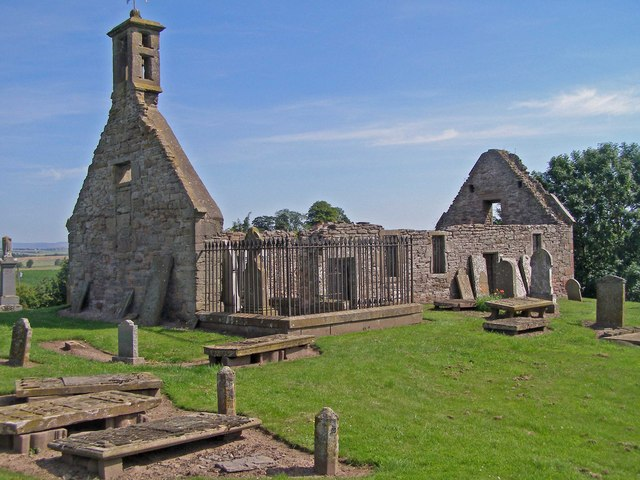
- Eassie Old Church and cemetery
- Eassie Old Church
- 56.61445°N 3.05656°W

Scheduled monument
- Official name: Eassie Old Church and cross slab
- Type: Crosses and carved stones: cross slab, Ecclesiastical: church
- Designated: 1 November 1921
- Reference no.: SM90125

Eassie Old Church is a ruined 13th-century parish church located near the village of Eassie in Angus, Scotland. Erected in the corner of the church is the Eassie Stone, a Class II Pictish stone. The cross slab was discovered in 1850 in the nearby burn. The church was abandoned after 1835 when a new church was built in the area to serve the combined parishes of Eassie and Nevay. Historic Environment Scotland established the site as a scheduled monument in 1921.

== Description ==
=== Church ===
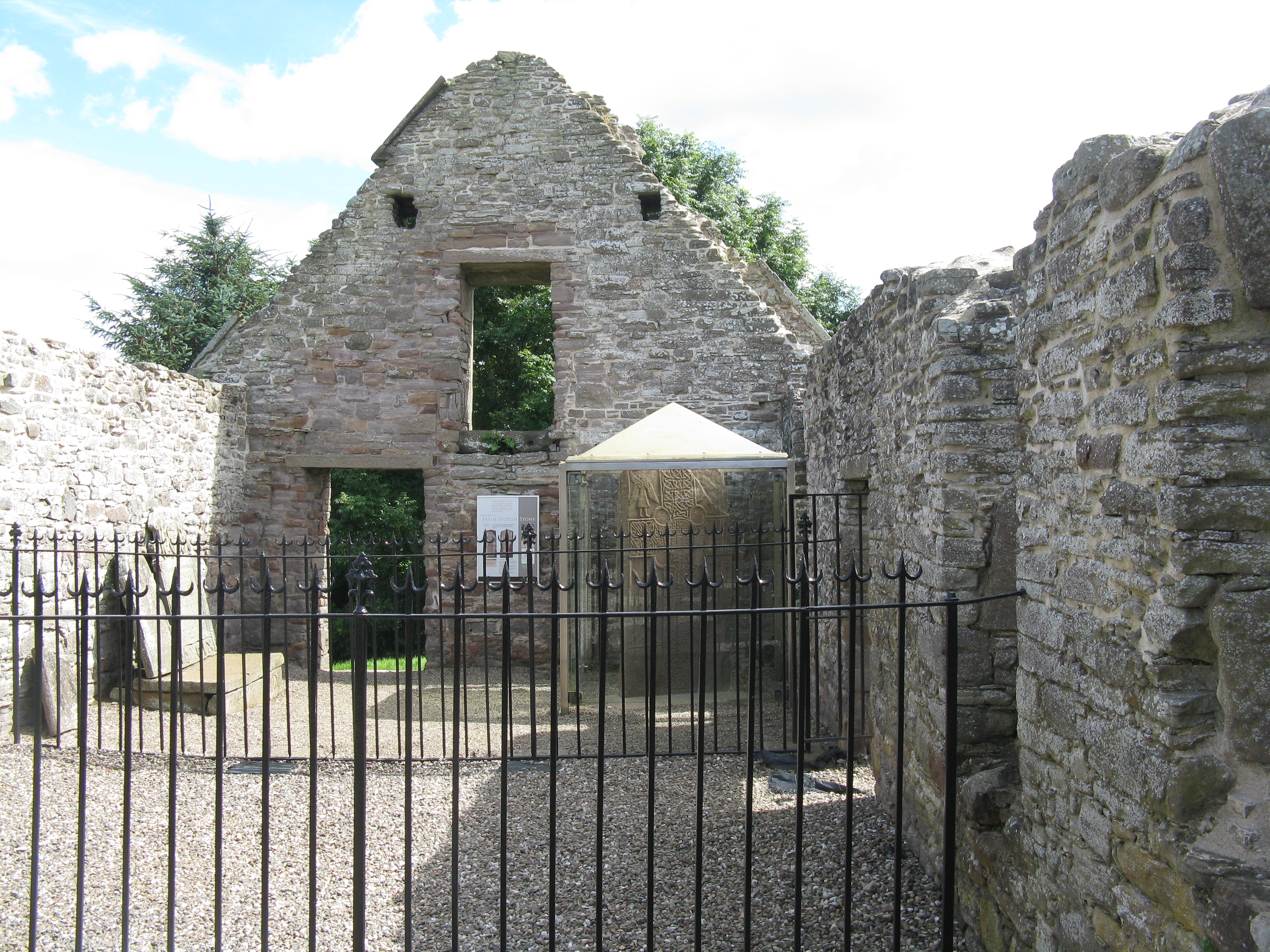
Interior of Eassie Church

The roofless church sits on a small rise and is surrounded by a burial ground. It can be found near the village of Eassie in Angus Scotland. The building is rectangular in design, measuring 17.2 m (56 ft) x 4.7 m (15 ft). Surviving in its original layout, it was mostly rebuilt in the late 16th century. The northern and southern walls survive to a height of 2.0 m (6 ft 7 in), the gables are original and the walls are 0.8 m (2 ft 7 in) thick. The west doorway in the south wall is 18th century, but the eastern doorway is original.

The church was initially constructed in red sandstone rubble blocks and slabs. The surviving walls have been repaired with concrete and brick. The west gable of the church holds a large two-stage bellcote, constructed from ashlar sandstone. It is topped with a flat stone slab that is capped by a ball finial and weather vane. The south wall has a Victorian burial enclosure with tall metal railings. The east gable has a first storey rectangular doorway that probably was an entrance to a gallery or loft.

The church interior has been divided into three separate areas. At the east end of the church stands a large Pictish cross slab enclosed within a protective enclosure. On both the interior and the exterior of the church, several gravestones are standing upright around the walls. The surrounding cemetery includes many old gravestones, including several tablestones, whose legs have been laid on their sides.

=== Cross slab ===
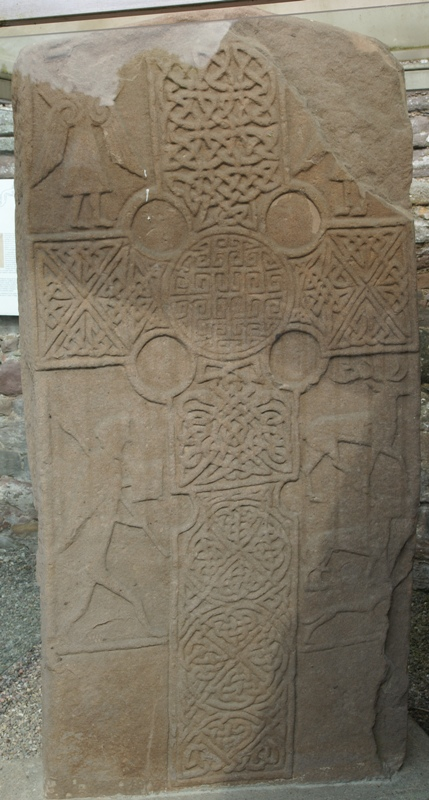
Eassie Sculpted Stone

The Eassie sculpted stone is a Class II symbol stone and one of the oldest surviving Pictish cross-slabs in the United Kingdom, dating to the late AD 600s. It is excellent condition for its age with most of the stone's details still visible. The stone was discovered in the 18th century at the bottom of the burn which runs close to the church. It was later moved to its present location.

The monument is an upright sandstone slab measuring 0.2 m (7.9 in) high by 0.1 m (3.9 in) wide and 0.25 m (9.8 in) thick. The well-preserved face of the stone consists of a large cross with an intricately carved interlace pattern. Above and below the cross are two angels, a warrior, as well as real and mythical animals. The slab's reverse side, more damaged and weathered than the front, contains a mixture of carved figures and Pictish symbols. The carved images include a damaged Pictish beast over a double disc and Z-rod. Also on the reverse side are images of three Picts wearing cloaks and carrying spears.

== History ==
The church dedicated to St Brandon, was on record in the 13th century. Most of the surviving remains date to the late 16th century. The parishes of Eassie and Nevay were combined in 1600. In 1835, a new church was built at a location convenient to both former parishes and the old churches were abandoned. Historic Environment Scotland established the site as a scheduled monument in 1921. The protected monument encompasses the remains of the church and cross slab as well as the close area that surrounds them.

== See also ==
- Nevay Church
- Kirriemuir Sculptured Stones
- Hilton of Cadboll Stone
