= Bridgend of Lintrathen =

Village in Angus, Scotland

Coordinates: 56.676767°N 3.168507°W

- Location within Angus
- OS grid reference: NO285545
- Council area: Angus
- Lieutenancy area: Angus
- Country: Scotland
- Sovereign state: United Kingdom
- Post town: KIRRIEMUIR
- Postcode district: DD8
- Dialling code: 01575
- Police: Scotland
- Fire: Scottish
- Ambulance: Scottish
- UK Parliament: Angus
- Scottish Parliament: Angus South

Bridgend of Lintrathen is a village in Angus, Scotland. It is situated on the southern shore of Loch of Lintrathen, six miles west of Kirriemuir.

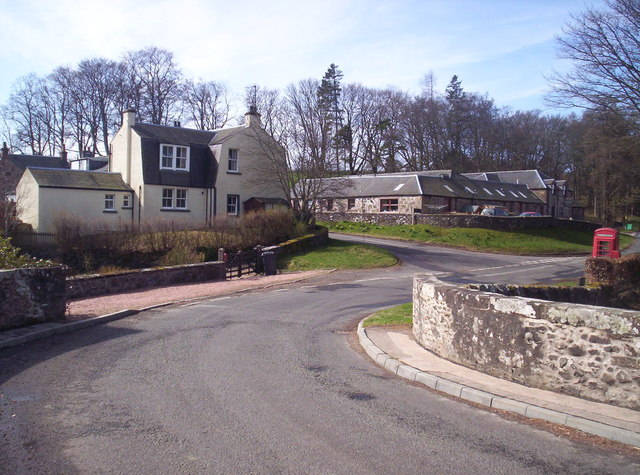
Bridgend of Lintrathen
