= Coupar Angus =

Town in Perth and Kinross, Scotland

Coordinates: 56.547°N 3.267°W

Coupar Angus: Scottish Gaelic: Cupar Aonghais
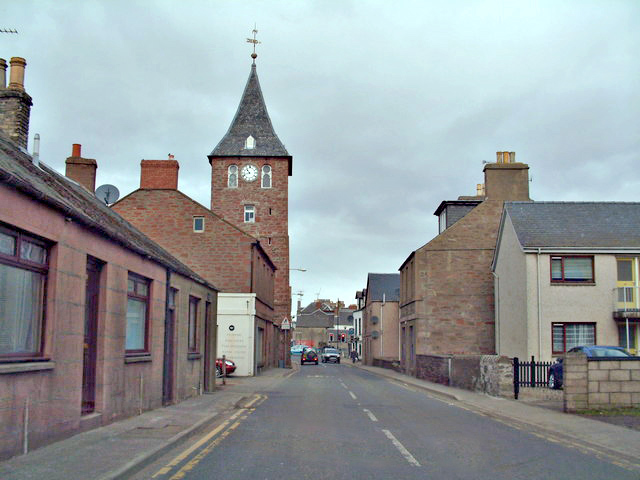
- Coupar Angus's clock tower

- Location within Perth and Kinross
- Population: 2,220 (2020)
- OS grid reference: NO222401
  - Edinburgh: 41 mi (66 km)
- Council area: Perth and Kinross
- Lieutenancy area: Perth and Kinross
- Country: Scotland
- Sovereign state: United Kingdom
- Post town: BLAIRGOWRIE
- Postcode district: PH13
- Dialling code: 01828
- Police: Scotland
- Fire: Scottish
- Ambulance: Scottish
- UK Parliament: Angus and Perthshire Glens
- Scottish Parliament: Perthshire North

Coupar Angus (/ˈkʊpər/; Gaelic: Cupar Aonghais) is a town in Perth and Kinross, Scotland. It lies on the River Isla in the broad and fertile Valley of Strathmore, 4 miles (6 kilometres) south of Blairgowrie. The A94 road from Perth to Forfar runs through the town, and it had a station on the Midland Junction line until 1967.

The town formerly straddled the border between Angus and Perthshire, but it has lain wholly within Perthshire since 1891. It retains the name "Coupar Angus", however, which serves to distinguish it from Cupar in Fife.

== History ==
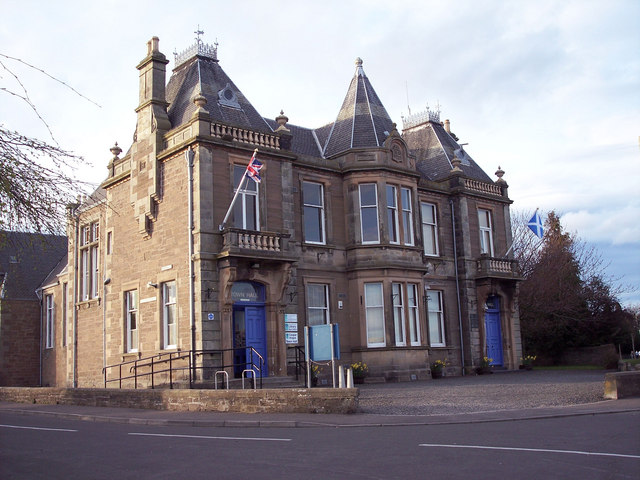
Coupar Angus Town Hall

The six-storey Tolbooth was built in 1762, funded by public subscription.

In the Middle Ages the Cistercian Coupar Angus Abbey was one of Scotland's most important monasteries, founded by Malcolm IV (1153–65) in the 1160s. Of the abbey, only architectural fragments, preserved in the 19th-century parish church (which is probably on the site of the monastic church), or built into houses and walls throughout the town, survive, along with part of one of its gatehouses.

Coupar Angus Town Hall was commissioned to celebrate the Golden Jubilee of Queen Victoria and completed in 1887.

Several Polish units were stationed in and around Coupar Angus during the Second World War.

The Scottish Fold breed of cat originated in or near Coupar Angus.

== Sport ==
Coupar Angus is home to the junior football club Coupar Angus F.C. and also Coupar Angus Amateur Football Club.

== Buses ==
Stagecoach South Scotland operate services 57/57A and 59 via Coupar Angus which go to Dundee, Blairgowrie and Perth. The services each run hourly.

== Notable people ==
- William Nairne Clark (1804–1854), born locally and one of the two protagonists that fought the first recorded duel in Western Australia.
- Alan Gilzean (1938-2018), locally-born former professional footballer from the 1960s and 1970s.
- Sir Robert Gillespie Reid (1842–1908), railway contractor.
- James Stirton (1833-1917), locally-born physician and leading expert on mosses and lichen.
- Jock Sutherland (1889-1948), locally-born coach for the Pittsburgh Steelers 1946–1947.
- Major-General Douglas Wimberley (1896-1983), commander of the 51st (Highland) Division in the Second World War.
