= Eassie =

Human settlement in Angus, Scotland

Coordinates: 56.592°N 3.086°W

- Location within Angus
- OS grid reference: NO353474
- Council area: Angus
- Lieutenancy area: Angus
- Country: Scotland
- Sovereign state: United Kingdom
- Post town: FORFAR
- Postcode district: DD8
- Dialling code: 01307
- Police: Scotland
- Fire: Scottish
- Ambulance: Scottish
- UK Parliament: Angus
- Scottish Parliament: Angus South

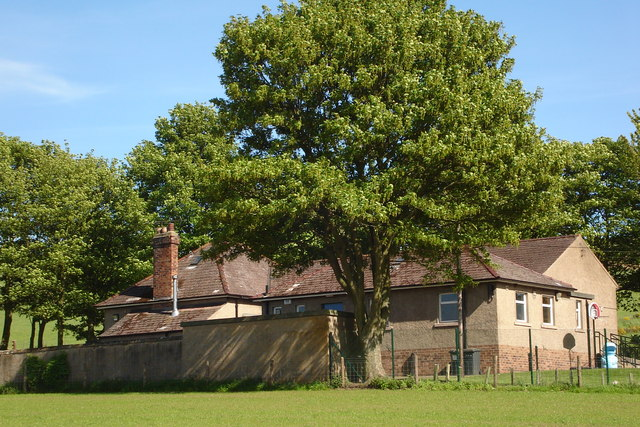
Rear view of Eassie Primary School

Eassie is a village located along the A94 road in Angus, Scotland. The church in Eassie is dedicated to Saint Fergus, a monk who worked at nearby Glamis. Eassie is noted for the presence of the Eassie Stone, a carved Pictish stone, which resides in the ruins of Eassie Old Church.

Other notable prehistorical or historical features in this region include Dunnottar Castle, Fasque House, Glamis Castle, Monboddo House, Muchalls Castle, Raedykes, Stone of Morphie and Stracathro.

== Famous residents ==
- Prof James Miller (1812–1864) was born in the manse in Eassie and raised in the village.

== See also ==
- List of places in Angus
- Ark Hill
- Castleton
- Drumtochty Forest
