= Eassie Stone =

Pictish stone in Scotland

Coordinates: 56.61442°N 3.05661°W

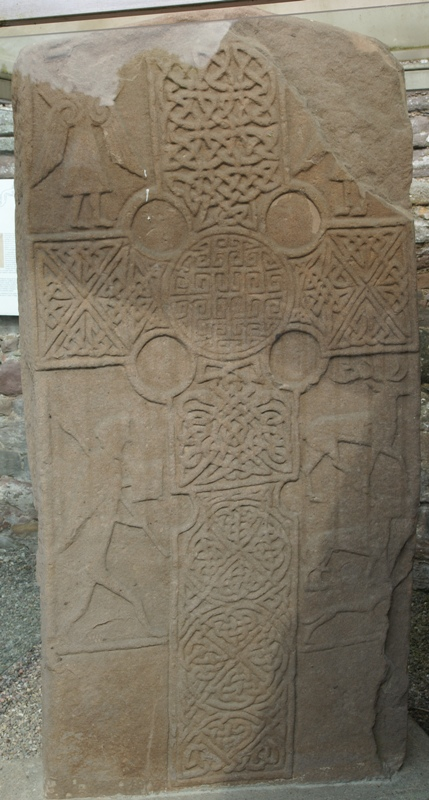
Sculpted cross on the front of the stone

The Eassie Stone is a Class II Pictish stone of about the mid 8th century AD in the village of Eassie, Angus, Scotland. The stone was found in Eassie burn in the late 18th century and now resides in a purpose-built perspex building in the ruined Eassie church.

== Location ==
The cross slab is housed in a purpose-built shelter with see-through walls within the roofless shell of the old Eassie parish church, grid reference NO35264745 on the north side A94 road some 4 kilometres (2.5 mi) west of Glamis and 6 kilometres (3.7 mi) east of Meigle.

== Description ==
The stone is a cross-slab 2.04 metres (6 ft 8 in) high and 1.02 metres (3 ft 4 in) wide, tapering to 0.84 metres (2 ft 9 in) at the top, and is 23 centimetres (9.1 in) thick. The slab is carved on both faces in relief and, as it bears Pictish symbols, it falls into John Romilly Allen and Joseph Anderson's classification system as a Class II stone.

The cross face bears a cross with circular rings in its angles, surrounding a circular central boss decorated with a keywork design. The arms and shaft are decorated with a variety of complex interlaced knotwork designs. The upper quadrants held a pair of angels, but have suffered some damage, the right-hand figure being almost completely lost. A similar four-winged angel can be found on the nearby Glamis 2 stone. The lower left-hand quadrant shows a cloaked warrior armed with a small square buckler and spear, and the lower right-hand quadrant depicts a stag and hunting hounds.

The rear face of the slab bears a mixture of figural representations and Pictish symbols. At the top of the face is a damaged Pictish beast over a double disc and Z-rod. Below this is a trio of cloaked figures, and to the right is a figure standing in front of a potted tree, which historian Lloyd Laing interpreted as having human heads suspended from its branches. Below this lie heavily weathered horseshoe and Pictish beast symbols. The bottom of the face holds representations of cattle which have suffered some weathering.

== History ==
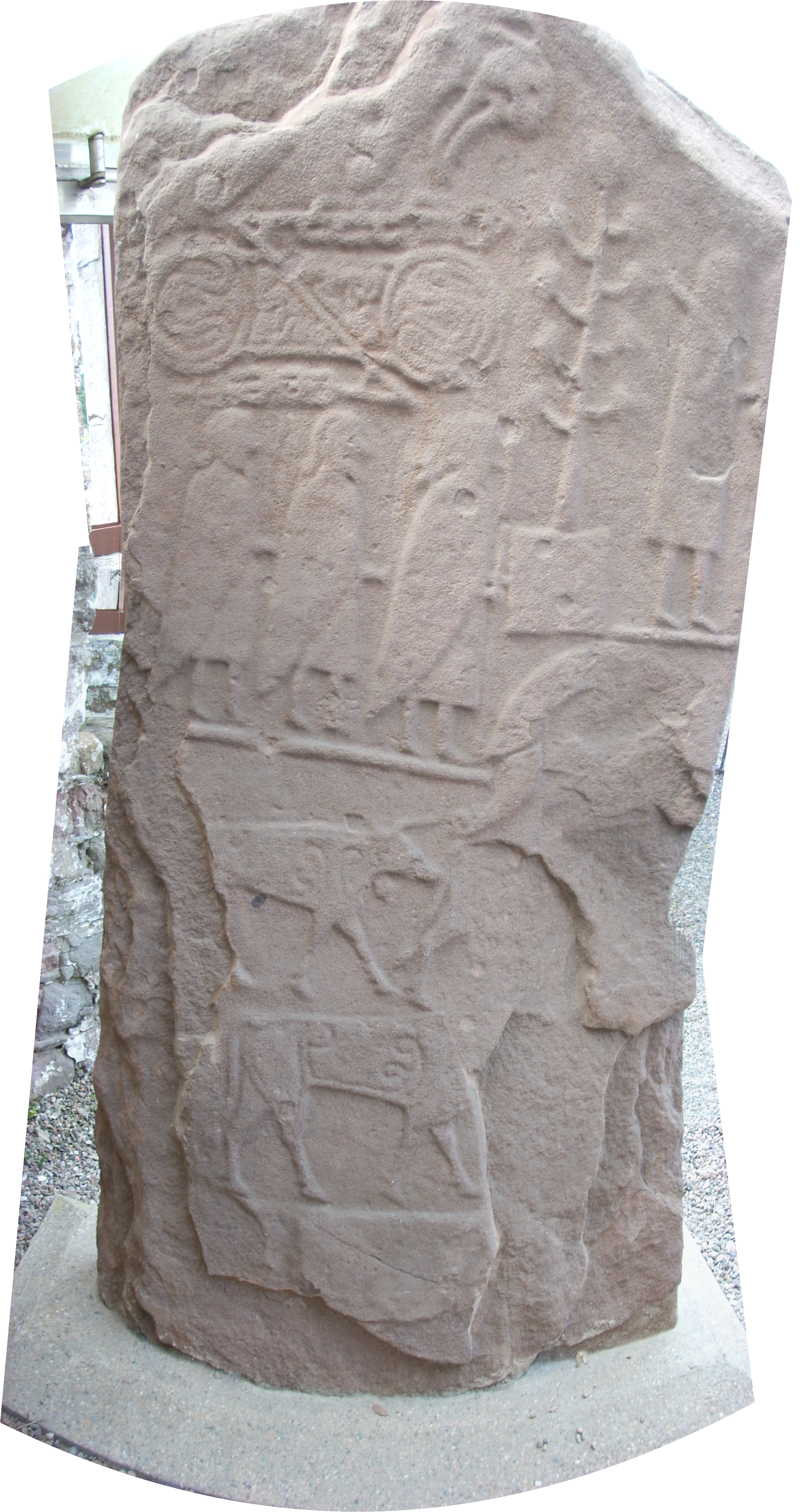
Rear of stone, showing sculpted figures and symbols

The cross-slab was found in the bed of the Eassie Burn, near Eassie Church by Rev. Cordiner, c. 1786. From there it was moved to the churchyard, where it stood for over a century, until the 1960s when a purpose-built building with viewing windows was built for it within the structure of the ruined church. The church itself was probably built in the 16th century on the site of an earlier building.

== Relationship with other stones ==
The Eassie stone belongs to the Aberlemno School of Pictish sculpture as extended by Lloyd Laing from Ross Trench Jellicoe's original proposed list. In addition to the Eassie stone, stones in the Aberlemno School include Aberlemno 2 (the Kirkyard Stone), Aberlemno 3, Menmuir 1, Kirriemuir 1, Monifieth 2, Rossie Priory, Glamis 1 and Glamis 2.

== See also ==
- Castleton
- Meigle Sculptured Stone Museum
