= Woodwrae Stone =

The Woodwrae Stone
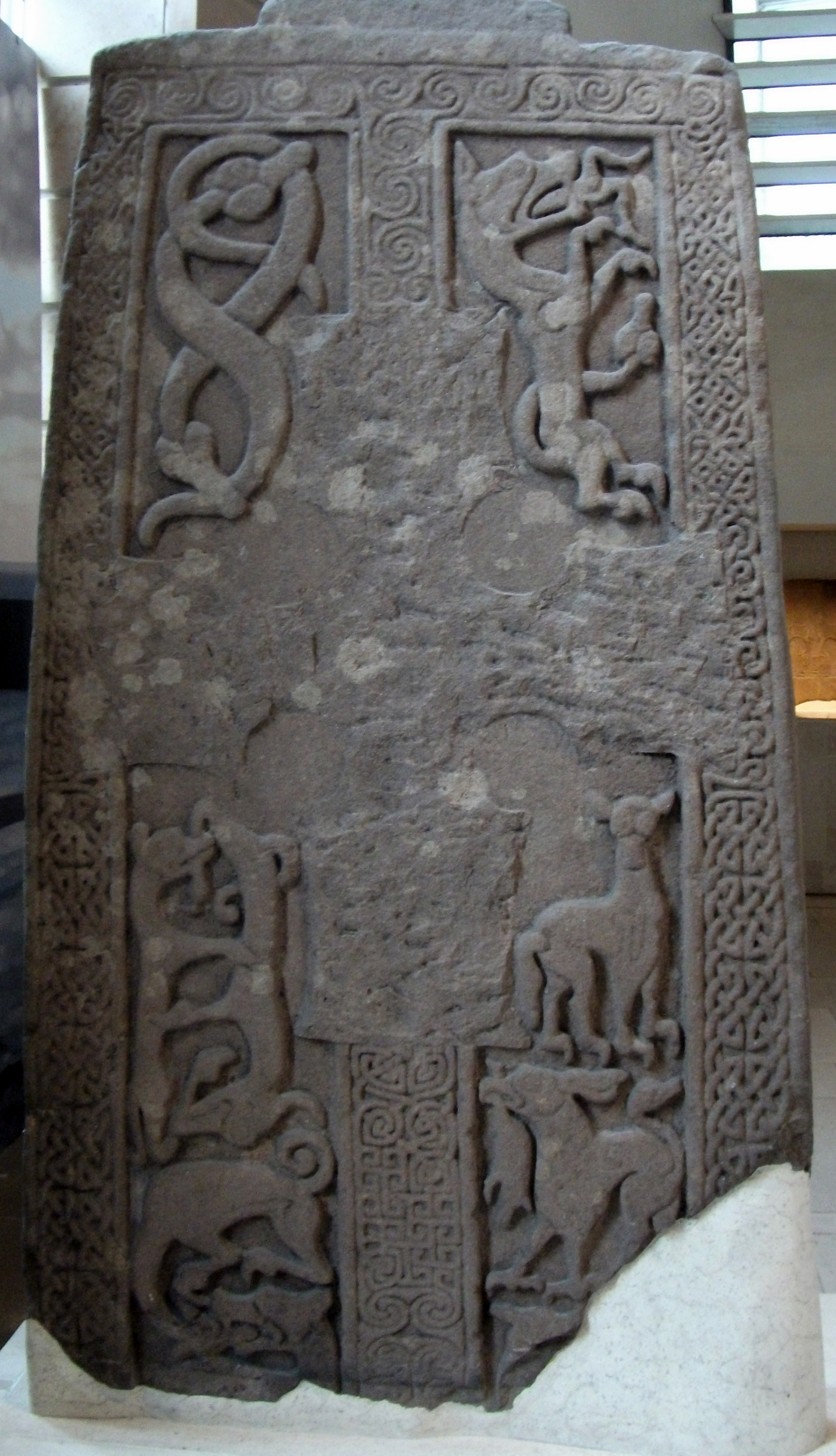
- The Woodwrae Stone
- Material: Old Red Sandstone
- Height: 1.75 metres (5.7 ft)
- Symbols: Celtic cross (defaced); Fantastic creatures; Hunting scene; Double disc
- Discovered: 1819
- Place: Woodwrae, Angus, Scotland
- Present location: Museum of Scotland, Edinburgh
- Coordinates: 55.946991°N 3.189183°W
- Classification: Class II cross slab
- Culture: Picto-Scottish

The Woodwrae Stone (alternatively the Woodwray Stone) is a Class II Pictish Stone (c. 8th or 9th century) that was found in 1819 when the foundations of the old castle at Woodwrae, Angus, Scotland were cleared. It had been reused as a floor slab in the kitchen of the castle. Following its removal from the castle, it was donated to the collection of Sir Walter Scott at Abbotsford House. It is now on display at the Museum of Scotland in Edinburgh.

== Location ==
Woodwrae castle occupied a position 1 kilometre (0.62 mi) north of Aberlemno, Angus grid reference NO51855663, now occupied by Woodwrae farm. The stone was used as a floor slab at the castle and was removed in 1819 to the collection of Sir Walter Scott at Abbotsford House grid reference NT506342 where it resided until it was donated to the Society of Antiquaries of Scotland in 1924.

== Description ==
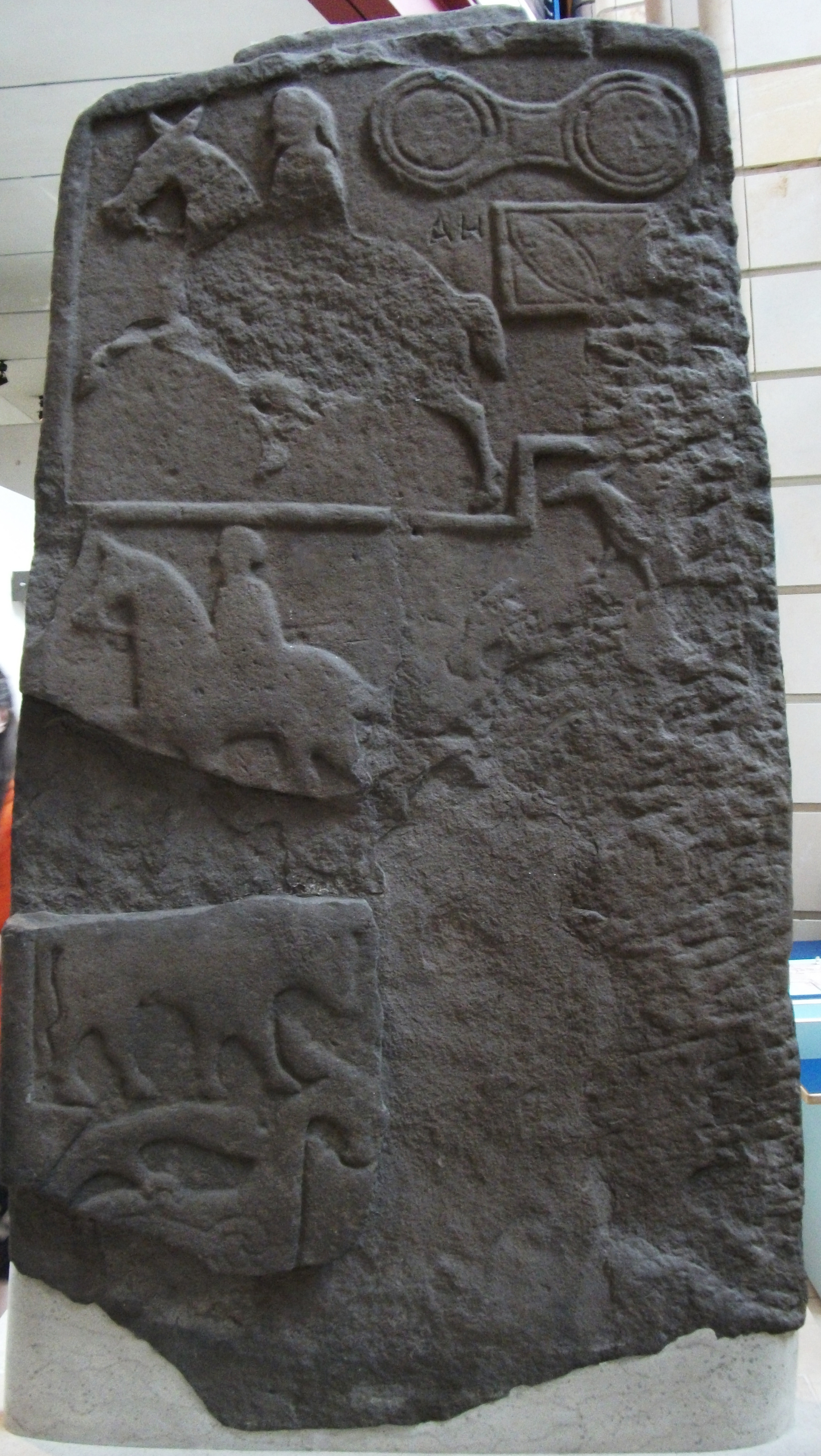
Rear face

The stone is a cross-slab 1.75 metres (5 ft 9 in) high and 1.02 metres (3 ft 4 in) wide, tapering to 0.84 metres (2 ft 9 in) at the top, and is 12.5 centimetres (4.9 in) thick. The slab is carved on both faces in relief and, as it bears Pictish symbols, it falls into John Romilly Allen and Joseph Anderson's classification system as a class II stone.

The cross face formerly bore a lobed cross, which has been deliberately erased, although the borders, decorated with interlaced knotwork, keywork and divergent spiral work remain. Also remaining intact are the fantastic creatures in the four quadrants surrounding the cross, including a beast with human legs dangling from its mouth, a feature that exists on other Pictish cross slabs, including the Dunfallandy Stone, as well as Irish High crosses.

The reverse face has suffered considerable mutilation. It is divided into three sections. The upper section bears a horseman, a Pictish double disc symbol and a step symbol. The lower two thirds of the face holds a second horseman and a variety of other animals, including a bull.

== Relationship with other sculptured stones ==
Woodwrae castle was located approximately 1 kilometre (0.62 mi) north of Aberlemno, Angus. This close proximity, and the similarity with the Class II slabs at Aberlemno has long been noted and it has been suggested that the stone originated there. Historian Ross Trench-Jellicoe has postulated, based on similarity of design and execution, an Aberlemno School of Pictish Sculpture, originating from Iona. Stones in the Aberlemno School include Aberlemno 2 (the Kirkyard Stone), Aberlemno 3, Menmuir 1, Kirriemuir 1 and Monifieth 2. To this list, Lloyd Laing has added the stones of Eassie, Rossie Priory, Glamis 1 and Glamis 2.
