= Glamis Stone =

Glamis Stone can refer to:

- The Glamis Hunter's Hill Stone - a Class II Pictish standing stone near Glamis, Angus, Scotland, otherwise known as Glamis 1
- The Glamis Manse Stone - a Class II Pictish standing stone in Glamis, otherwise known as Glamis 2
