= Cairnton stone =

Pictish symbol stone in Aberdeenshire, Scotland

Cairnton Stone
- Height: 1.3 metres (4.3 ft)
- Width: 0.91 metres (3.0 ft)
- Symbols: Crescent and V-rod; Triple disc
- Discovered: 2001, Cairnton Farm, Aberdeenshire
- Present location: Marischal Museum, Aberdeen, Scotland
- Coordinates: 57.2678°N 2.2386°W
- Classification: Class I incised stone
- Culture: Picto-Scottish

The Cairnton Stone is a class I Pictish stone dating to the seventh century, discovered in 2001 at Cairnton Farm, near Newmachar, Aberdeenshire, Scotland. It bears the incised symbols of the Crescent and V-rod and triple disc. The carving appears on one face of a kite-shaped natural slab, which is weathered. It was discovered lying in a large field clearance heap and was subsequently declared Treasure Trove. The stone is now in the collection of the Marischal Museum, Aberdeen.
