= Glamis Manse Stone =

Coordinates: 56.6096°N 3.0022°W

The Glamis Manse Stone
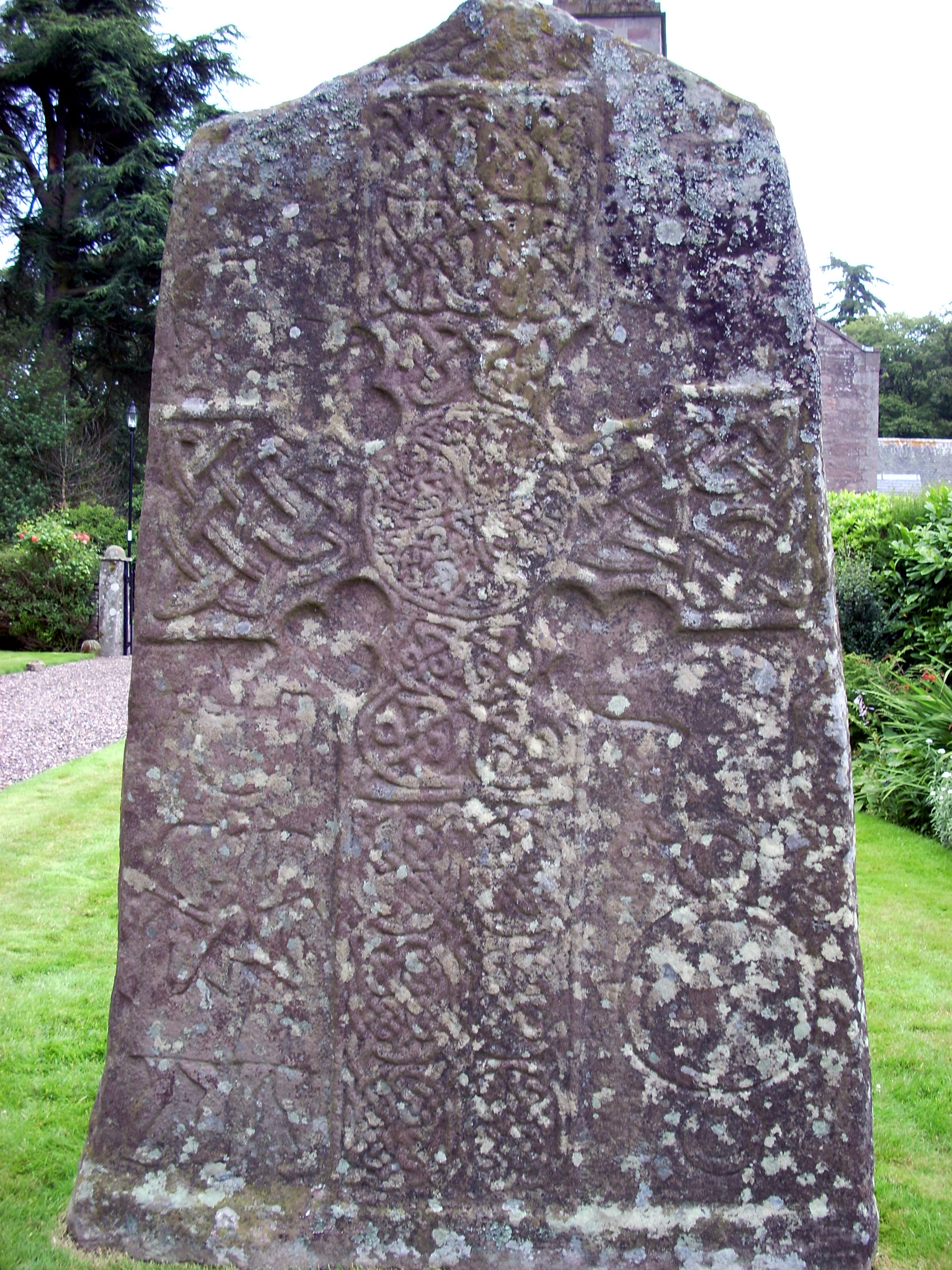
- The front of the Glamis Manse Stone with its intricately carved cross.
- Material: Old Red Sandstone
- Height: 2.76 metres (9 ft 1 in)
- Symbols: Serpent; Fish; Mirror; Celtic Cross with knotwork interlace; Hounds head; Centaur; Triple disc
- Created: Ninth century CE
- Discovered: 1811
- Place: Glamis, Angus, Scotland
- Classification: Type II cross slab
- Culture: Picto-Scottish

Designations

Scheduled monument
- Official name: Glamis 2 Cross Slab
- Type: Crosses and carved stones: cross slab
- Designated: 3 March 1922
- Reference no.: SM152

The Glamis Manse Stone, also known as Glamis 2, is a Class II Pictish stone at the village of Glamis, Angus, Scotland. Dating from the 9th century, it is located in the garden of the Manse, close to the parish church and is visible only from 20m. It is inscribed on one side with a Celtic cross and on the other with a variety of Pictish symbols. It is a scheduled monument.

== Location ==
The cross slab is situated at the northeast edge of Glamis village in the grounds of the Manse, close to St Fergus church (grid reference NO38584686).

== Description ==
The stone is a cross-slab 2.76 metres (9 ft 1 in) high, 1.5 metres (4 ft 11 in) wide and 24 centimetres (9.4 in) thick. The slab is pedimented and carved on the cross face in relief, and the rear face bears incised symbols. It falls into John Romilly Allen and Joseph Anderson's classification system as a class II stone.

The cross face bears a Celtic cross carved in relief with ogee armpits. It has an incised ring and the shaft and roundel are decorated with knotwork interlace designs, with the arms and portion above the roundel holding zoomorphic interlaces. The cross is surrounded by incised symbols and figural representations. In the lower left-hand quadrant is depiction of two bearded, long-haired men apparently fighting with axes. Above them is what appears to be a cauldron with human legs dangling out of it. The lower right-hand quadrant holds what appears to be either a deer or a hound's head, similar to symbols found on the Monifieth 2 stone, above a triple disc symbol. The top right quadrant holds a centaur holding a pair of axes. The top left quadrant holds what has been interpreted as a lion.

The rear of the slab holds three incised symbols: a serpent above a fish, with a mirror at the bottom.

Historian Lloyd Laing has noted some peculiarities of the layout of the cross face. Firstly, the arms are not perfectly perpendicular to the shaft, being rotated slightly (2.5° anticlockwise). Secondly, the axis of the interlace of the cross roundel is skewed from the axis of the shaft by some 13°.

== Relationship with other stones ==
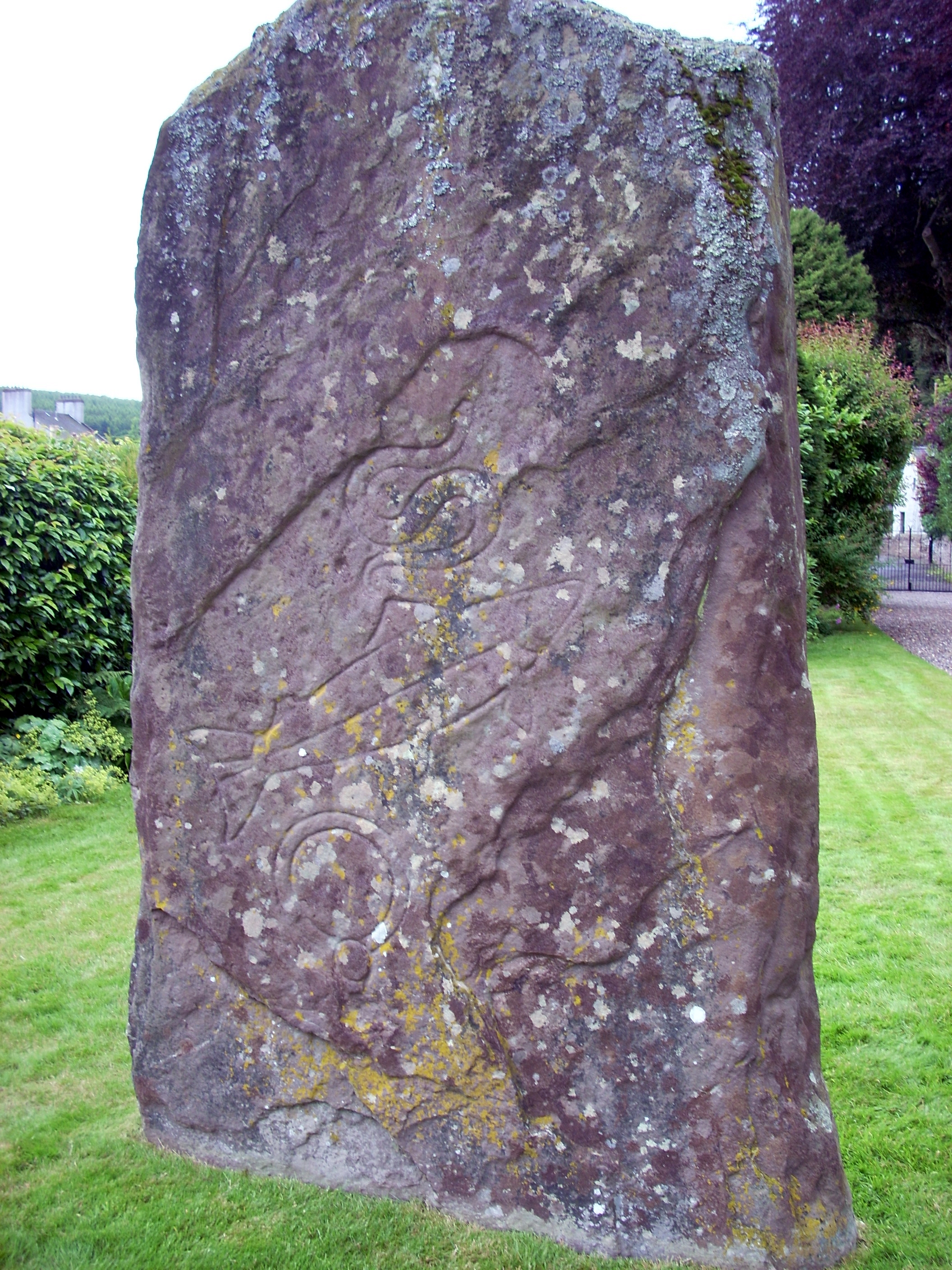
Rear of the stone, showing incised symbols

The Glamis manse stone belongs to the Aberlemno School of Pictish sculpture as extended by Laing from Ross Trench Jellicoe's original proposed list. In addition to the Glamis manse stone, stones in the Aberlemno School include Aberlemno 2 (the Kirkyard Stone), Aberlemno 3, Menmuir 1, Kirriemuir 1, Monifieth 2, Eassie, Rossie Priory, and Glamis 1 (Hunter's Hill).

== See also ==
- Hunter's Hill Stone (Glamis 1)
