= Hunter's Hill Stone =

Archaeological site in Angus, Scotland

Coordinates: 56.6068°N 2.9893°W

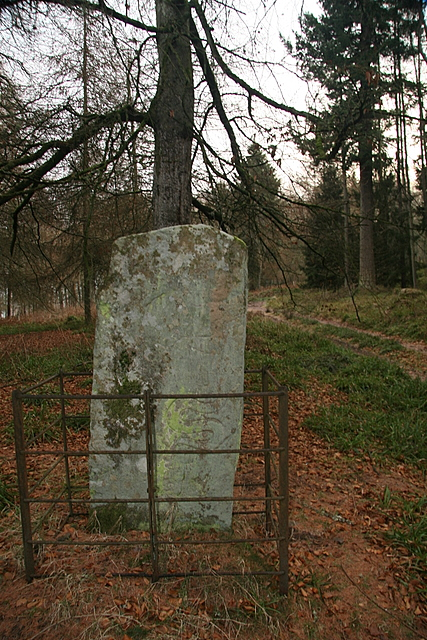
Rear of Hunter's Hill stone, showing incised symbols

The Hunter's Hill Stone, otherwise known as the Glamis 1 Stone, is a Class II Pictish standing stone at Hunter's Hill to the south east of Glamis village, Angus, Scotland.

The symbol stone on Hunters Hill is probably in situ. Symbol stones are divided into two "classes". Class I are natural stones with carvings, while the later "Class II stones" have reliefs. The Hunters Hill stone is both. Originally a carved natural stone, it was later carved with a relief on the back. The other stone that has been reused in this way is the symbol stone of Glamis Manse, about 800 m to the west.

== Location ==
The cross slab is located in woodland on the north slope of Hunter's Hill, to the south east of Glamis village, immediately south of the A94 road (grid reference NO39374654).

== Description ==
The stone, a cross-slab, is 1.52 metres (5 ft 0 in) high, 0.71 metres (2 ft 4 in) wide. The slab is carved on the cross face in relief, and the rear face bears incised symbols. It falls into John Romilly Allen and Joseph Anderson's classification system as a class II stone.

== Relationship with other stones ==
The Hunter's Hill stone belongs to the Aberlemno School of Pictish sculpture as extended by Laing from Ross Trench Jellicoe's original proposed list. In addition to the Glamis manse stone, stones in the Aberlemno School include Aberlemno 2 (the Kirkyard Stone), Aberlemno 3, Menmuir 1, Kirriemuir 1, Monifieth 2, Eassie, Rossie Priory, and the Glamis Manse Stone (Glamis 2).

== See also ==
- Glamis Manse Stone (Glamis 2)
