= Double disc (Pictish symbol) =

Symbol found in stone and metalwork

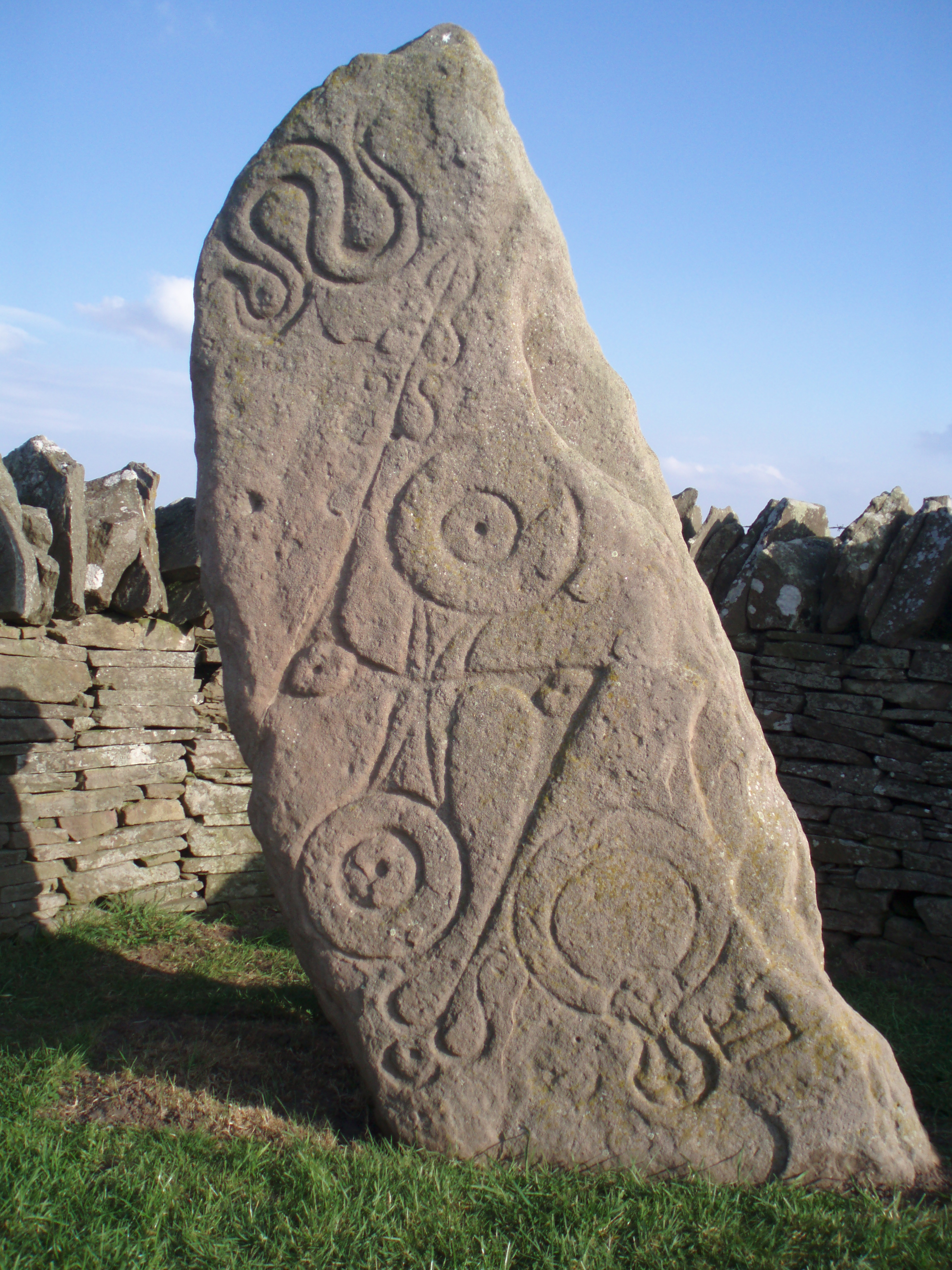
Aberlemno 1; Class I stone with double disc and Z rod

The double disc is a Pictish symbol of unknown meaning that is frequently found on Class I and Class II Pictish stones, as well as on Pictish metalwork. The symbol can be found with and without an overlaid Z-rod (also of unknown meaning), and in combinations of both (as with the Monifieth 1 stone).

In his Rhind lecture of 14 October 1880 Joseph Anderson said of the double-disc and Z-rod and of the crescent and V-rod:

Bearing in mind that they are Christian, and that it is impossible to give them any older or more restricted attribution, it is plain that there is but one symbol which equals them in importance, if that be judged by the frequency of their occurrence and the universality of their application. That symbol is the cross, the common emblem of the central doctrine of the Christian faith. Whatever may have been the significance attached to these symbols, it could not have been of a trivial or unimportant character. From their prominent place in the system of symbolism, ... their arbitrary significance appears to have been considered ... almost equal to that ... of the cross itself, with which they are so often associated.

This does not mean that the symbols did not predate the adoption of Christianity by the Picts: rather, that after the conversion the symbols acquired Christian meaning which made them suitable for depiction on Christian monuments.

The double disc and Z rod appears in the top border of the back of the Hilton of Cadboll stone where the left, right and bottom border depict vine-scrolls representing the True Vine. Paintings and icons of the True Vine show Christ at the top centre, so this may have been the meaning of the Pictish symbol.

Alternatively, like other Pictish symbols, it may have been a clan or lineage indicator.

== Gallery ==
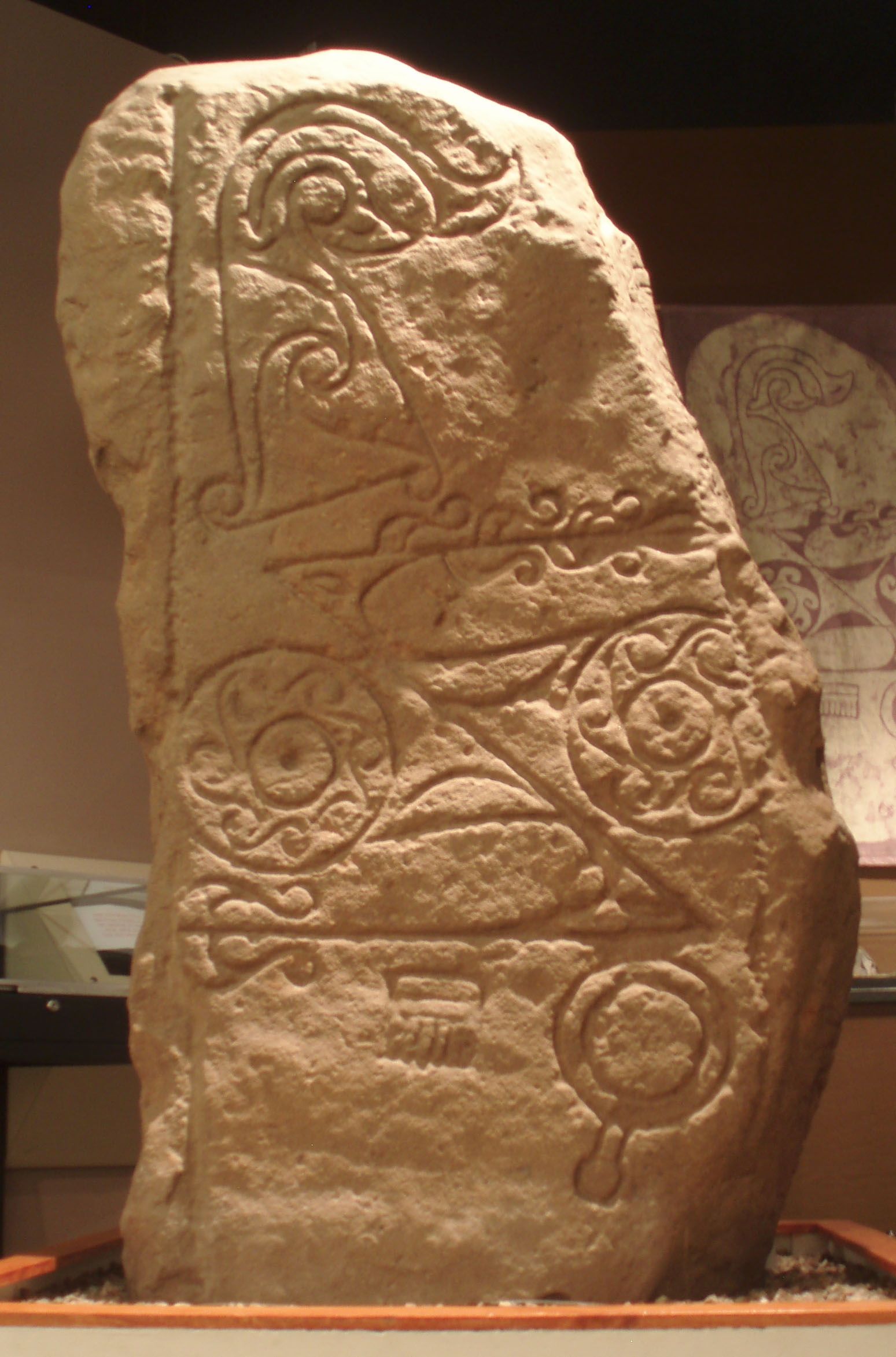
Dunnichen Stone; Class I with double disc and Z rod

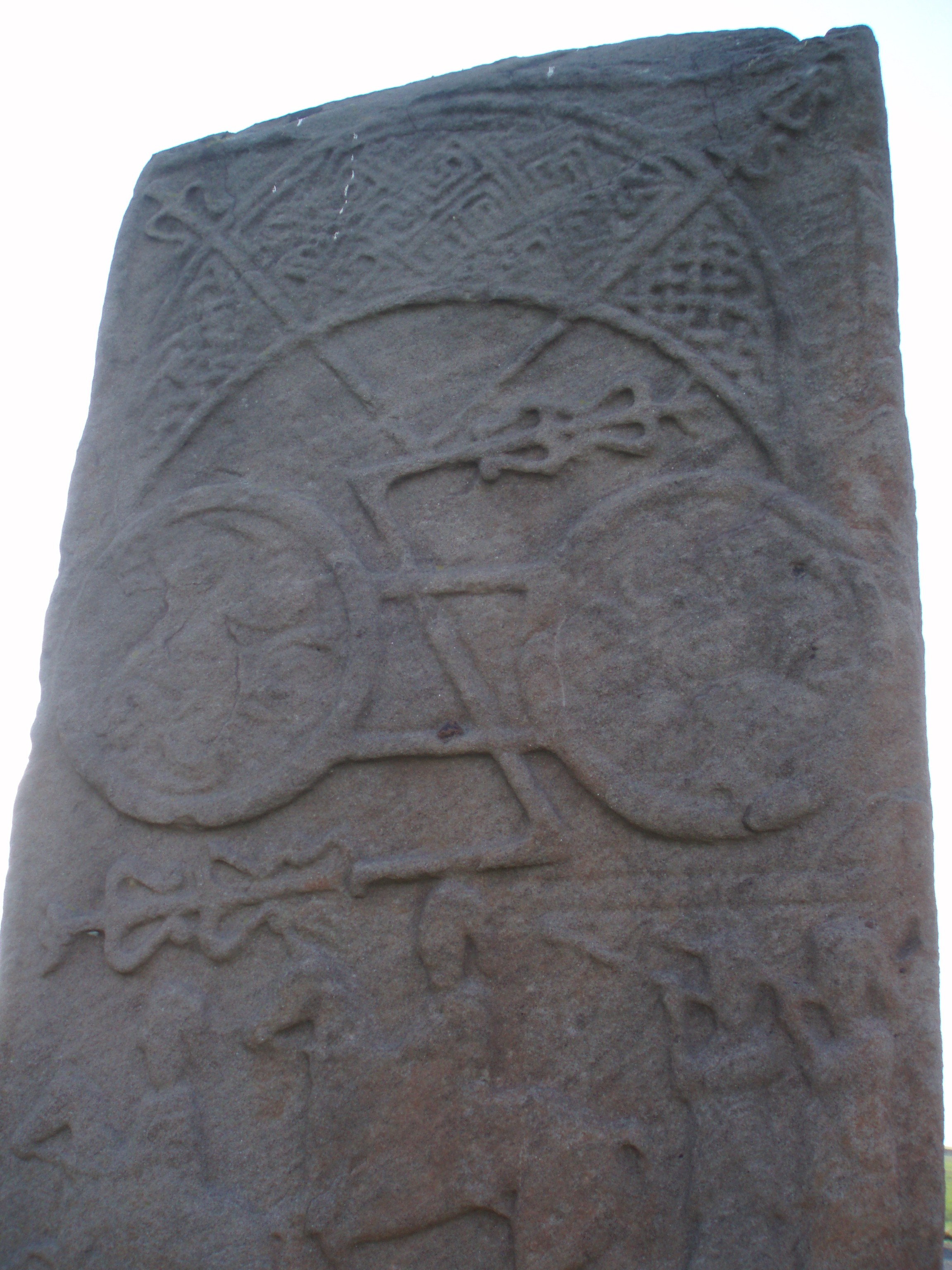
Aberlemno 3 rear face detail; Class II

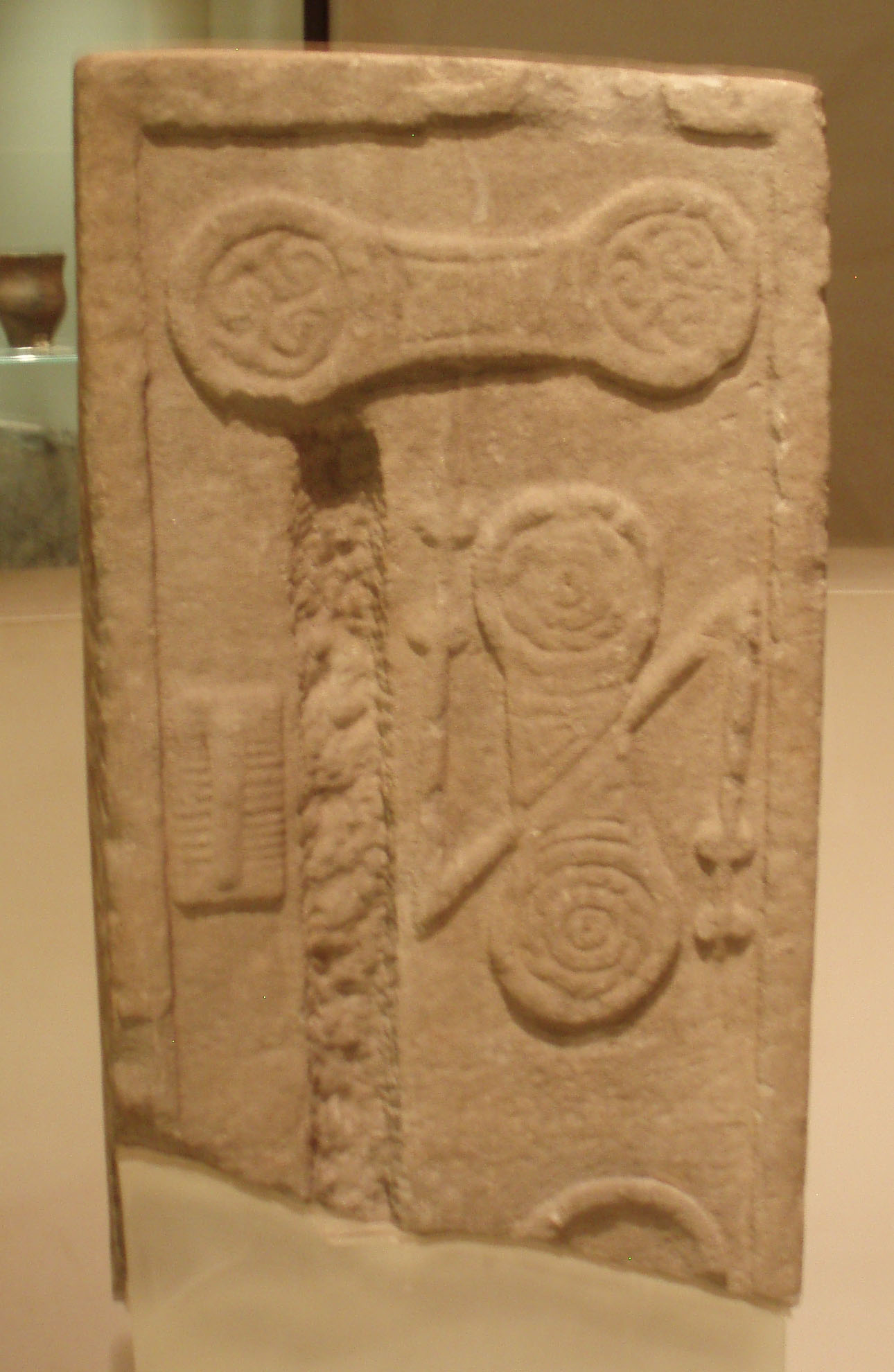
Monifieth 1; Class II stone with double discs with and without Z-rod

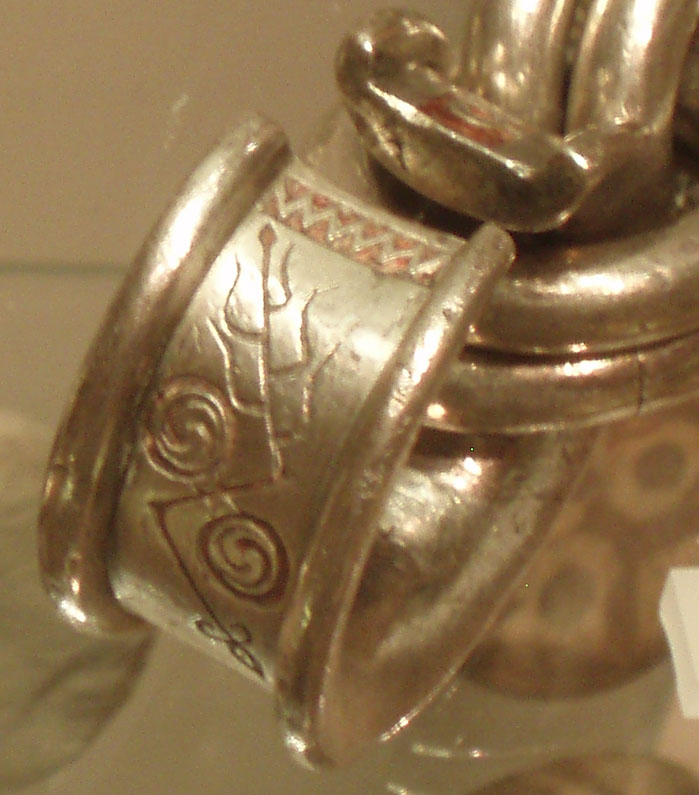
Detail of penannular ring on Whitecleuch Chain showing double disc and Z-rod

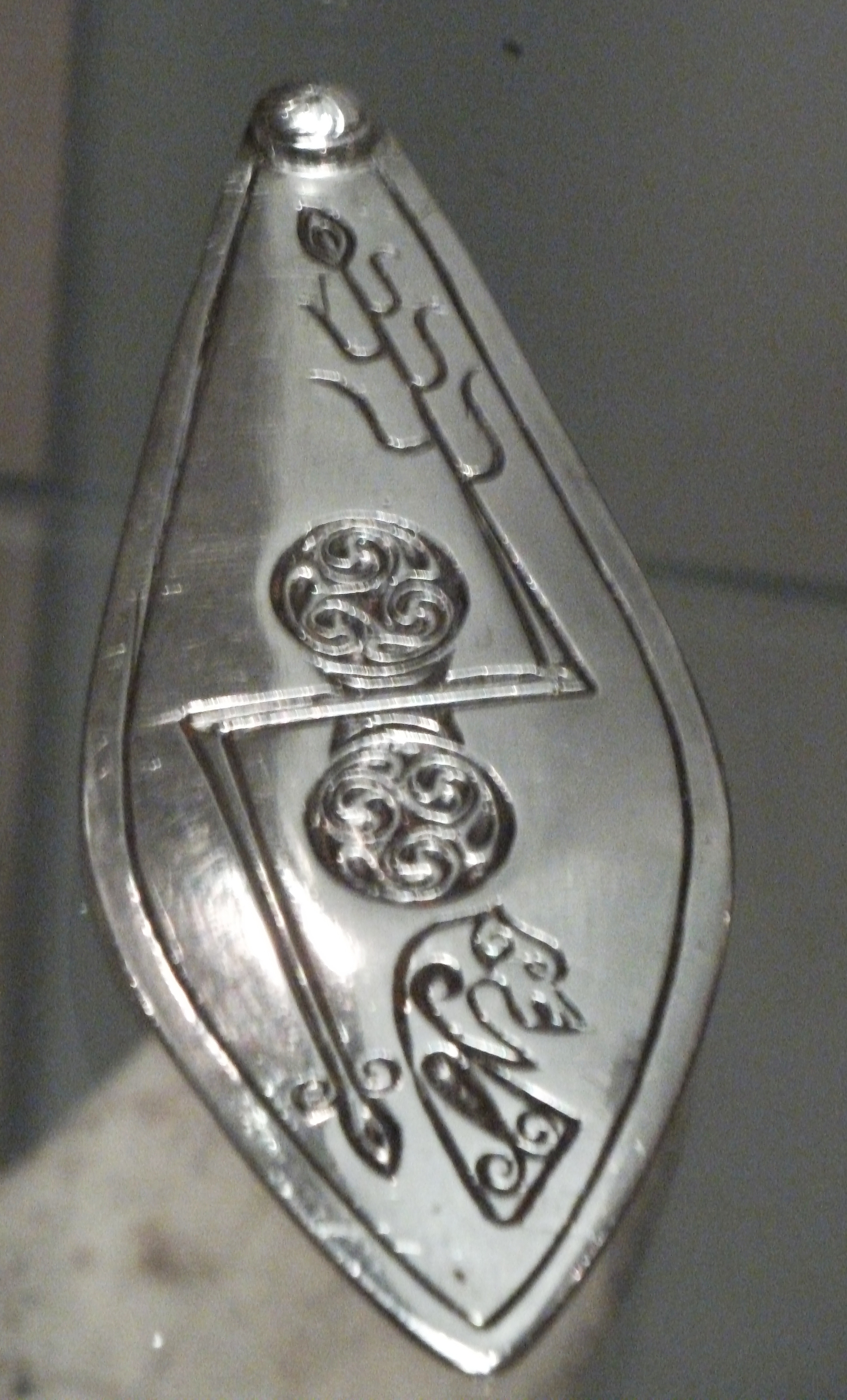
Plaque from Norrie's Law hoard showing Double disc and Z-rod

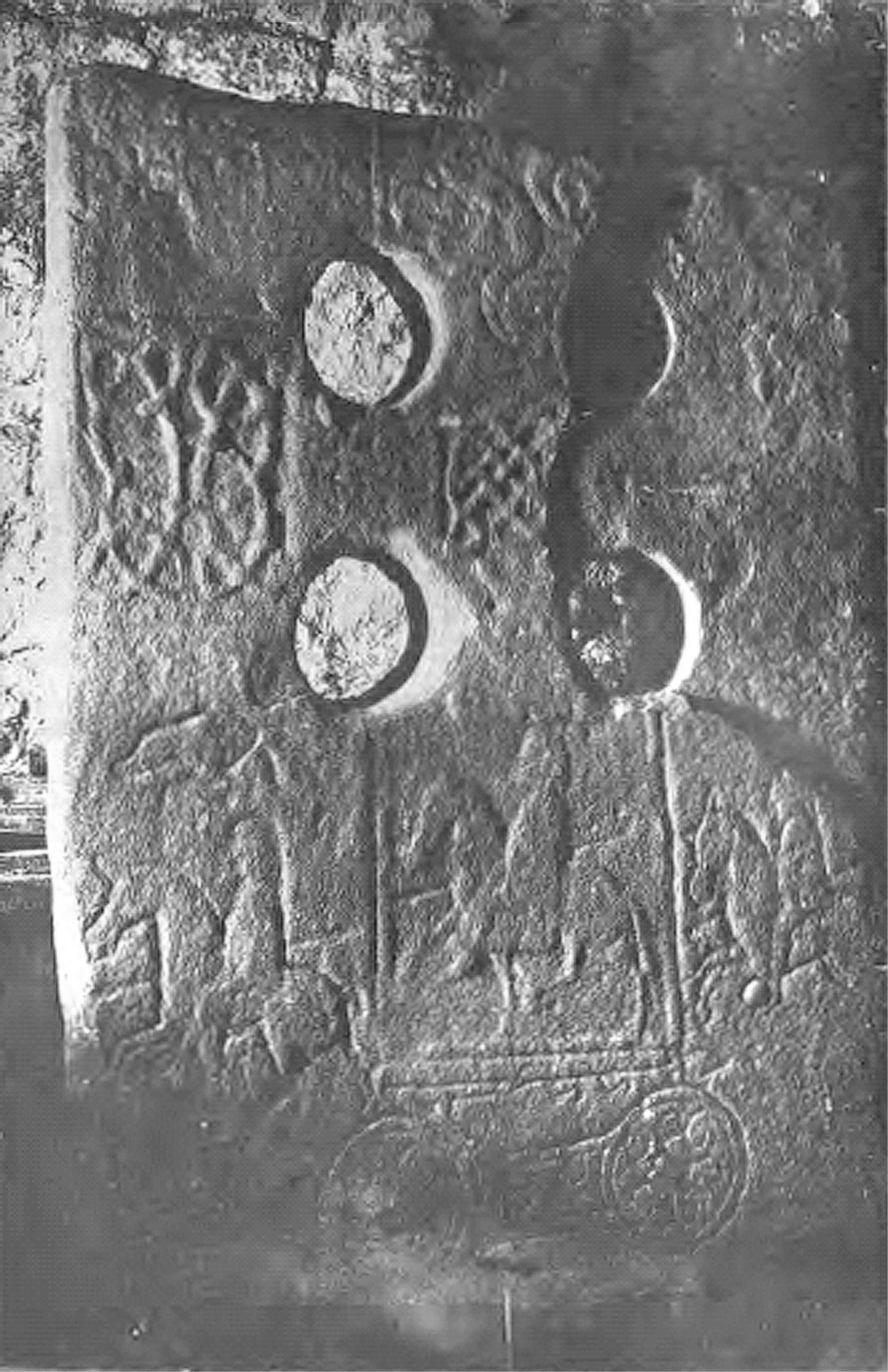
Fordoun stone

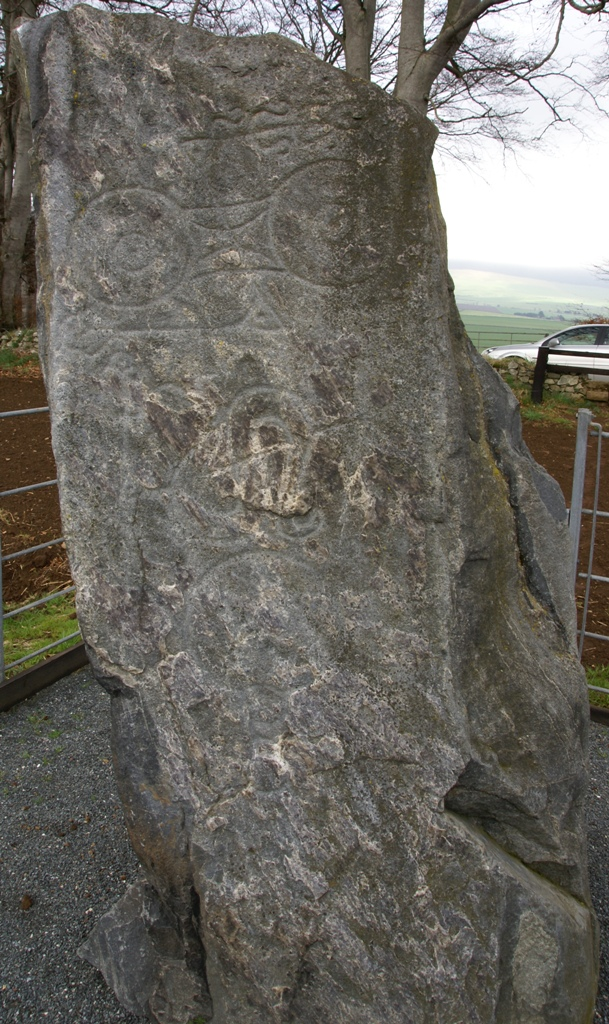
Picardy Stone

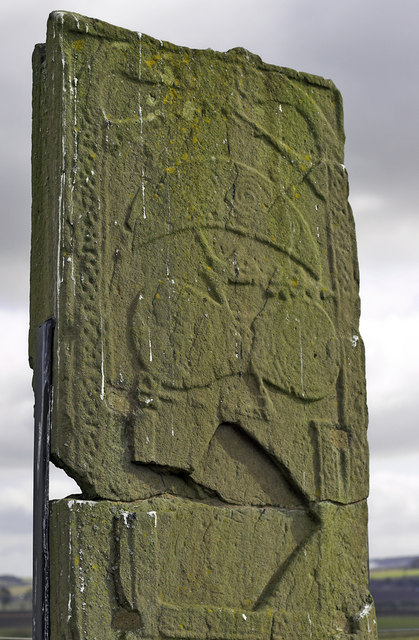
St Orland's Stone

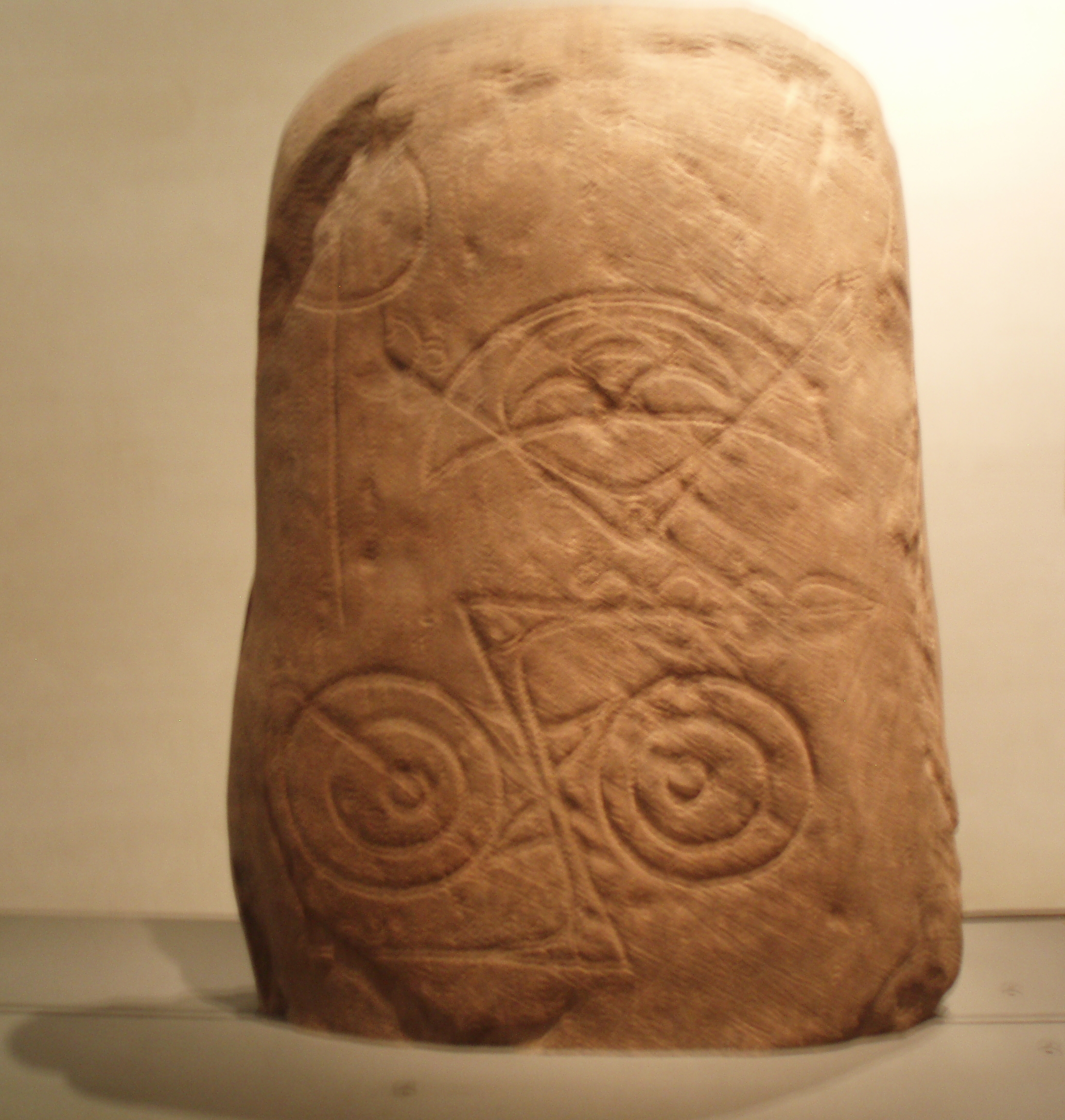
Invereen Stone

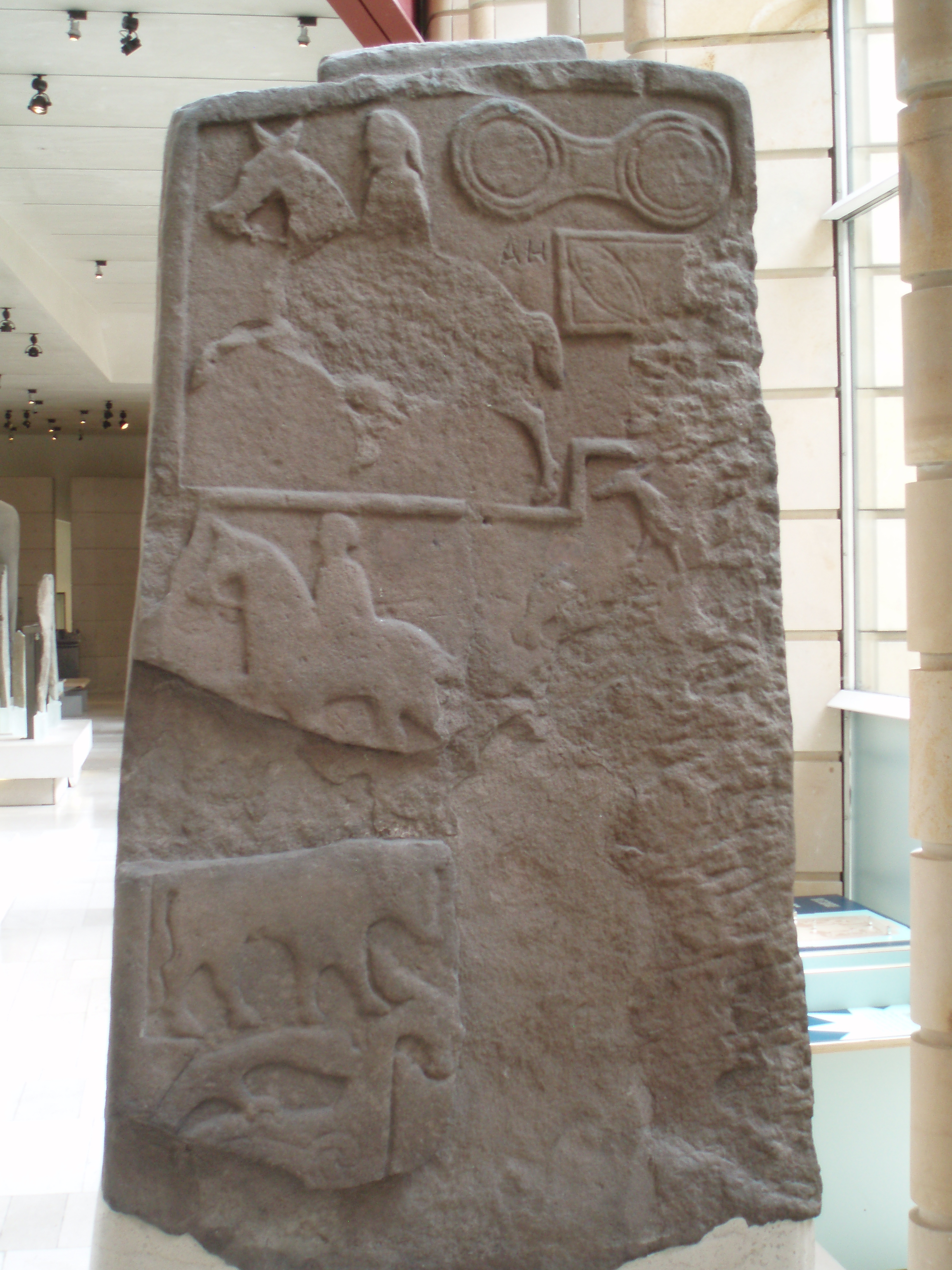
Woodwrae Stone rear face
