= Aberlemno sculptured stones =

Five Pictish standing stones in Scotland

Coordinates: 56°41′21″N 2°46′53″W

Designations

Scheduled monument
- Official name: Aberlemno, cross slab and symbol stones
- Type: Crosses and carved stones: cross slab
- Designated: 31 December 1921
- Reference no.: SM90004

Location of the stones in Scotland

The Aberlemno Sculptured Stones are a series of Pictish standing stones originating in and around the village of Aberlemno, Angus, Scotland. Three are located in the village and a fourth, found in 1962, is on display in The McManus in Dundee. They date from the Early Medieval period. A fifth stone standing in the village has signs of carving, but is of unknown authenticity as a Pictish artefact.

== Location ==
Aberlemno 1, 3 and 5 are located in recesses in the dry stone wall at the side of the road in Aberlemno (grid reference NO522559). Aberlemno 2 is found in the Kirkyard, 300 yards south of the roadside stones.(grid reference NO5223955554) In recent years, attempts have been made to move the stones to an indoor location to protect them from weathering, but this has met with local resistance and the stones are currently covered in the winter. The stones are covered with wooden boxes from the last working day of September until the first working day of April.

Aberlemno 4, the Flemington Farm Stone was found 30 yards from the church (grid reference NO524556), and is now on display in The McManus, Dundee.

== Description ==
=== Aberlemno 1 ===
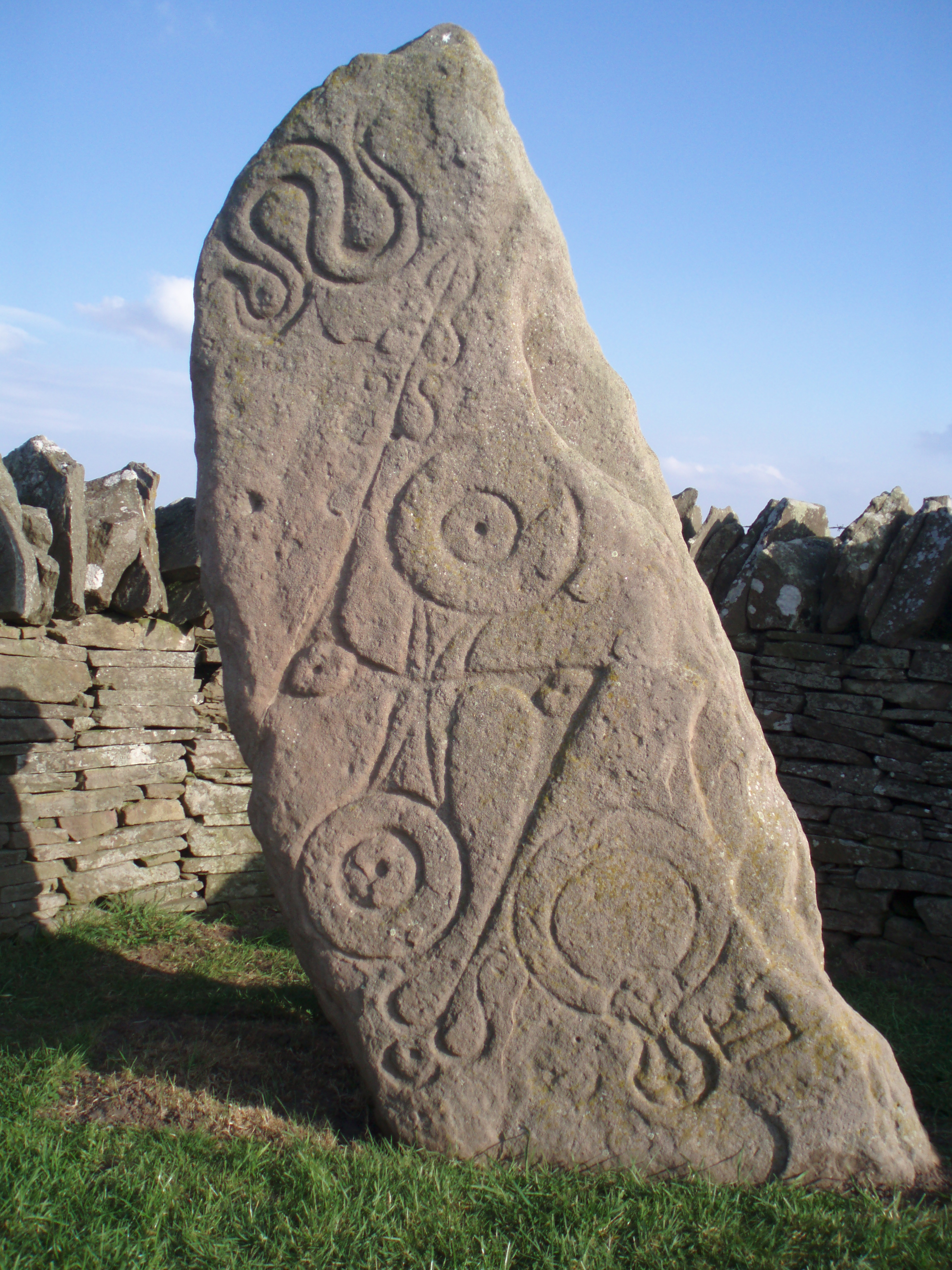
Aberlemno 1

Aberlemno 1 is the northern roadside stone. It is an unshaped standing stone, bearing incised Pictish symbols, defining it under J Romilly Allen and Joseph Anderson's classification system as a Class I stone. The symbols on one face: the serpent, the double disc and Z-rod and the mirror and comb. The meaning of these symbols is unknown. They are deeply incised in a bold, confident line, and this stone is considered to be one of the finest and best-preserved Pictish symbol stones still standing in or near its original position. The other face of the stone exhibits prehistoric cup marks, showing that it has been re-used.

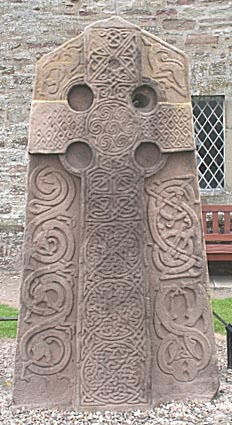
Aberlemno II: Kirkyard Stone, Class II Pictish Stone

=== Aberlemno 2 ===
Aberlemno II, found in Aberlemno kirkyard, is a shaped cross-slab, bearing Pictish symbols as well as Christian symbols in relief, defining it as a Class II stone. The stone, carved from Old Red Sandstone, stands 2.3 metres (7.5 ft) tall, 1.3 metres (4.3 ft) wide at the base, tapering to 0.9 metres (3.0 ft) wide at the top, and is 0.2 metres (7.9 in) thick.

The west face is inscribed with a quadrilobate Celtic Cross. The cross bears several styles of Celtic pattern designs. The vertical arms are inscribed with three separate knotwork designs, the horizontal arms with keywork designs. The central roundel has a spiral design composed of three interconnecting triskeles. Bordering the cross are a number of Celtic zoomorphic designs, reminiscent of Northumbrian designs and designs from the Book of Kells. A hole has been bored through the upper part of the stone some time after its sculpting.

The rear face features two Pictish symbols, a notched rectangle with z-rod and a triple disc. Below this are nine figures which have been interpreted as a narrative account of a battle.

Until recently, it was thought to date to the mid-8th century, but subsequent art-historical analysis has suggested a mid-9th century date.

=== Aberlemno 3 ===
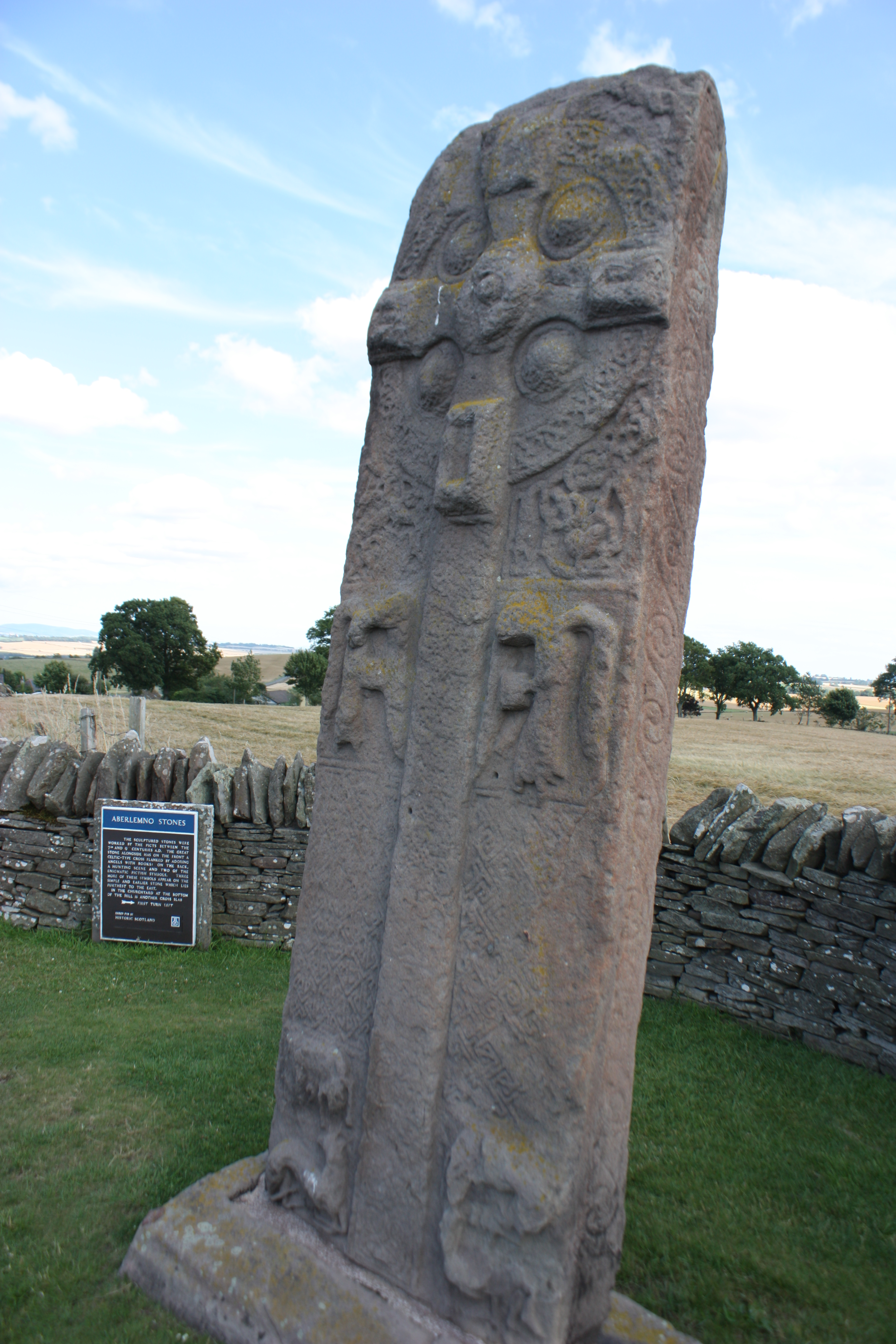
Aberlemno 3

The western road-side stone is another Class II stone. It has an elaborately decorated ringed cross flanked by adoring angels on one side, and a hunting scene on the reverse, below two large Pictish symbols. This stone is known as Aberlemno 3. This stone has until recently been thought to date from the late eighth century. More recent comparative analyses have suggested that it may be of a later, mid-ninth-century origin.

Aberlemno 3 has different proportions to the Kirkyard Cross-slab, being relatively tall and thin, with parallel sides which have incised decoration (those of the other cross-slab are plain). The monument's height and decoration on four faces both suggest it is later in date than Aberlemno 2. Its nearest artistic analogies appear to be sculptures from Easter Ross in northern Scotland, notable the Hilton of Cadboll stone (now in the Museum of Scotland), which has a closely similar hunting scene.

=== Aberlemno 4 ===
This stone, found in 1961 is approximately 1.5 metres tall, 0.5 m wide and 0.3 m thick. It has incised symbols on an unworked stone, defining it under J Romilly Allen and Joseph Anderson's classification system as a Class I stone. There are two symbols, a horseshoe and a Pictish Beast. The anterior portion of the beast symbol (facing right) has suffered some damage due to ploughing, but is still easily visible.

=== Aberlemno 5 ===
The central roadside stone bears only traces of incised marks. This stone is thought to be unfinished or a later fake. This stone is known as Aberlemno 5.

=== 2022 stone ===
A stone was found in 2022 by a group led by archaeologist Gordon Noble of Aberdeen University. This would fit within Allen and Anderson's Class I group of stones. The carvings on this stone include a double disk and z-rod, crescent and v-rod, mirror and comb, and a possible large v-rod without associated symbol encompassing all symbols.

=== Woodwrae stone ===
The Woodwrae Stone was recovered from a ruined castle that occupied a position 1 kilometre (0.62 mi) north of Aberlemno. It was one of two carved stones used as floor slabs at the castle and was removed in 1819 to the collection of Sir Walter Scott at Abbotsford House, the other stone being lost at some point. The extant stone was donated to the Society of Antiquaries of Scotland in 1924 and can be seen at the National Museum of Scotland in Edinburgh.

== The battle scene on Aberlemno 2 ==
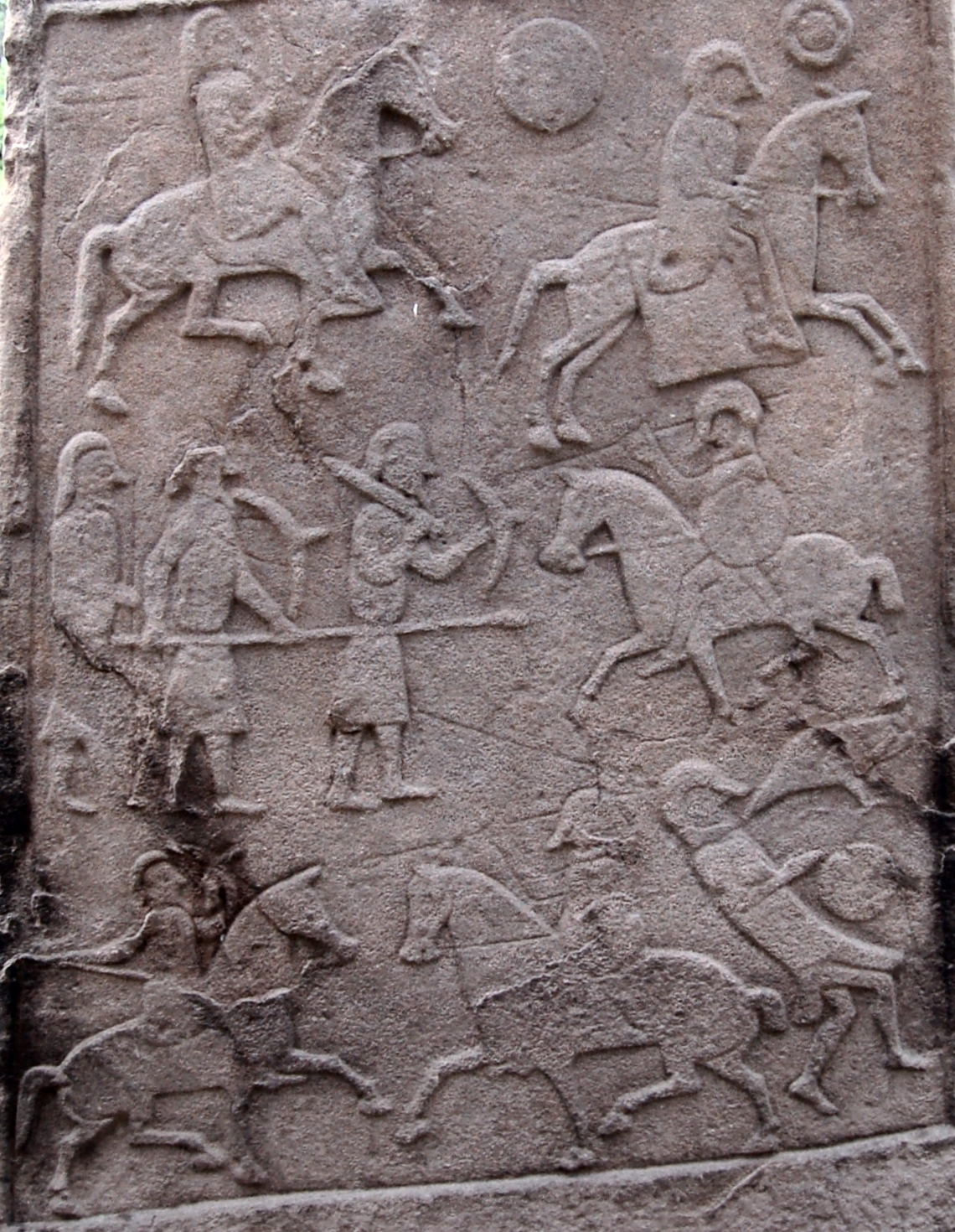
Pictish Stone at Aberlemno Church Yard – battle scene detail

On the rear of Aberlemno 2 is a scene showing human figures bearing weapons, apparently engaged in battle. The figures appear in three rows. The top row has an unhelmeted figure on horseback riding behind a helmeted rider, possibly in pursuit. The helmeted rider is armed with a spear and appears to have dropped his sword and shield. The middle row has a helmeted rider armed with a spear and shield facing three unhelmeted infantry soldiers armed with spears, swords and shields. The bottom row shows a mounted and unhelmeted figure and mounted helmeted figure facing each other, both armed with spears. Behind the helmeted rider lies a helmeted casualty, with a bird to his right.

The battle scene has been interpreted in numerous ways. The earliest record of the stone by Hector Boece, from the 16th century, links the scene with the Battle of Barry (now known to be historically inauthentic):

82. Parem cladem nobilissimus Danorum manipulus est sortitus ad Aberlemnonem vicum vix a Bretheno, nunc civitate episcopali sede honestata, quatuor passuum millibus, qui a Scotis interceptus ibidem ferro occubuit. Quo loco ingens lapis est erectus. Huic animantium effigies nonnullis cum characteribus artificiose, ut tum fiebat, quae rem gestam posteritati annunciarent, sunt insculptae.

82. A noble company of Danes suffered a similar slaughter near the village of Aberlemno, a village four miles distant from Brechin (nowadays a city possessing the honour of an episcopal see), which was intercepted by the Scots and put to the sword. Here a great stone was erected, carved with lifelike figures and an artfully-engraved inscription (according to the lights of those days) to record this achievement for posterity.

This interpretation persisted well into the mid-19th century, some time after antiquarian George Chalmers identified Dunnichen as a possible site of the Battle of Dun Nechtain.

While it was noted in 1955 by Robert Stevenson, keeper of the Museum of Antiquities of Scotland, that the helmets depicted on the stone were of a general sub-Roman design and the helmeted figures were likely to be Picts, the superficial similarity of the helmets with their long nasal, with the Anglo-Saxon Coppergate Helmet found at York in 1982 has led to the notion that the helmeted figures are Northumbrians. This, coupled with the stone's proximity to Dunnichen (3 miles (5 km) to the south) led to the interpretation made by historian Graeme Cruickshank that the scene was a depiction of the Battle of Dun Nechtain.

Cruickshank's interpretation, published in 1985, 1300 years after the Battle of Dun Nechtain, received general acceptance, although he has been criticised for his suggestions that the stone was created soon after the battle in 685, when the conventional view at the time was that it was sculpted a century later.

The subsequent identification of Dunachton in Badenoch as a second candidate for the site of the battle, and the revised dating of the stone to the mid-9th century has weakened Cruickshank's argument somewhat, and alternative interpretations have been made, including that the scene depicts a battle between Picts and Vikings, or that it is a memorial to the 8th-century Pictish king Óengus I, or even that it represents a spiritual struggle.

== Gallery ==
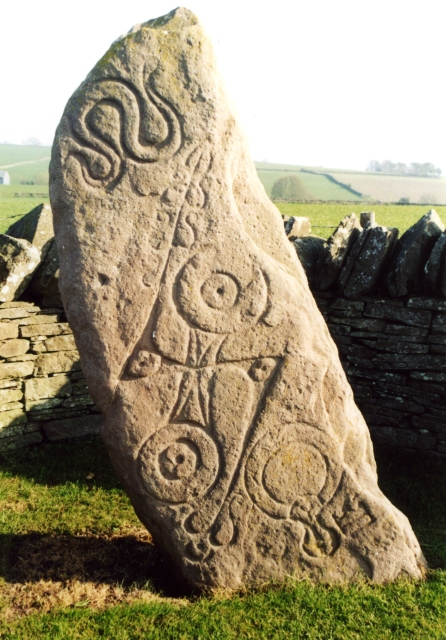
Aberlemno 1

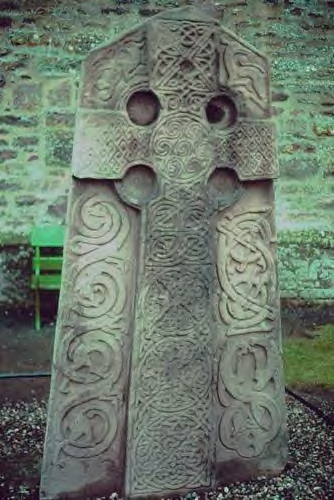
Aberlemno 2 front face

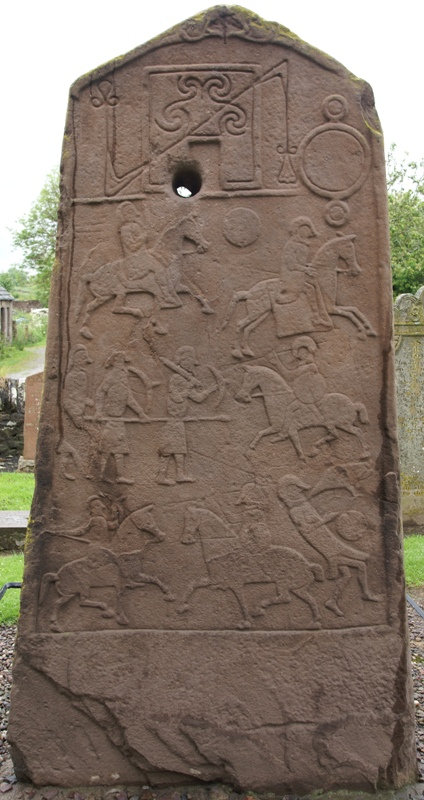
Aberlemno 2 rear face

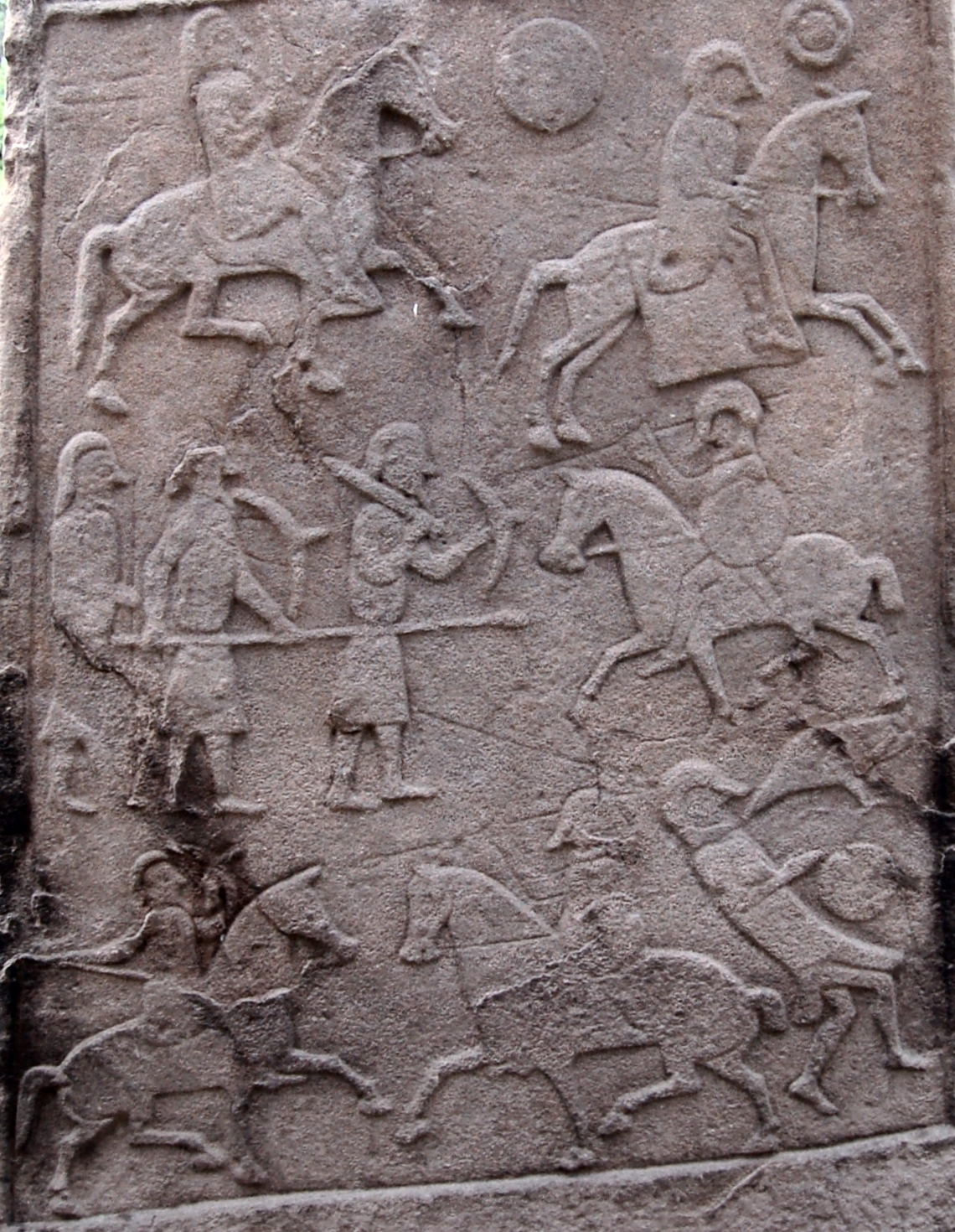
Aberlemno 2 'battle' detail

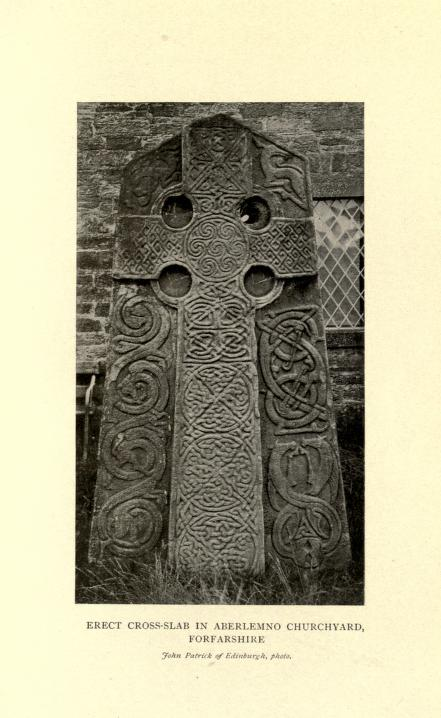
Early photo of Aberlemno 2

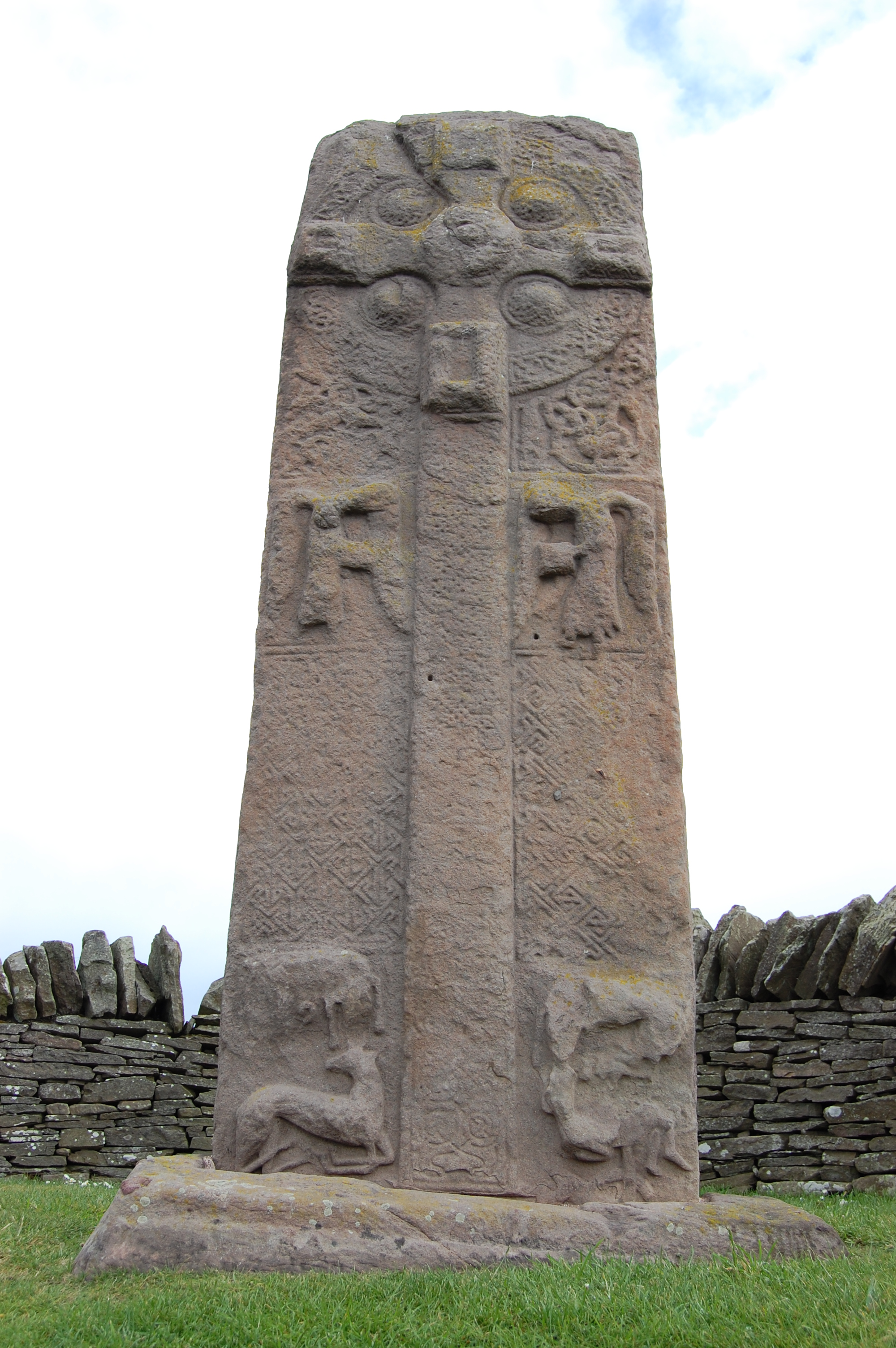
Aberlemno 3 front face

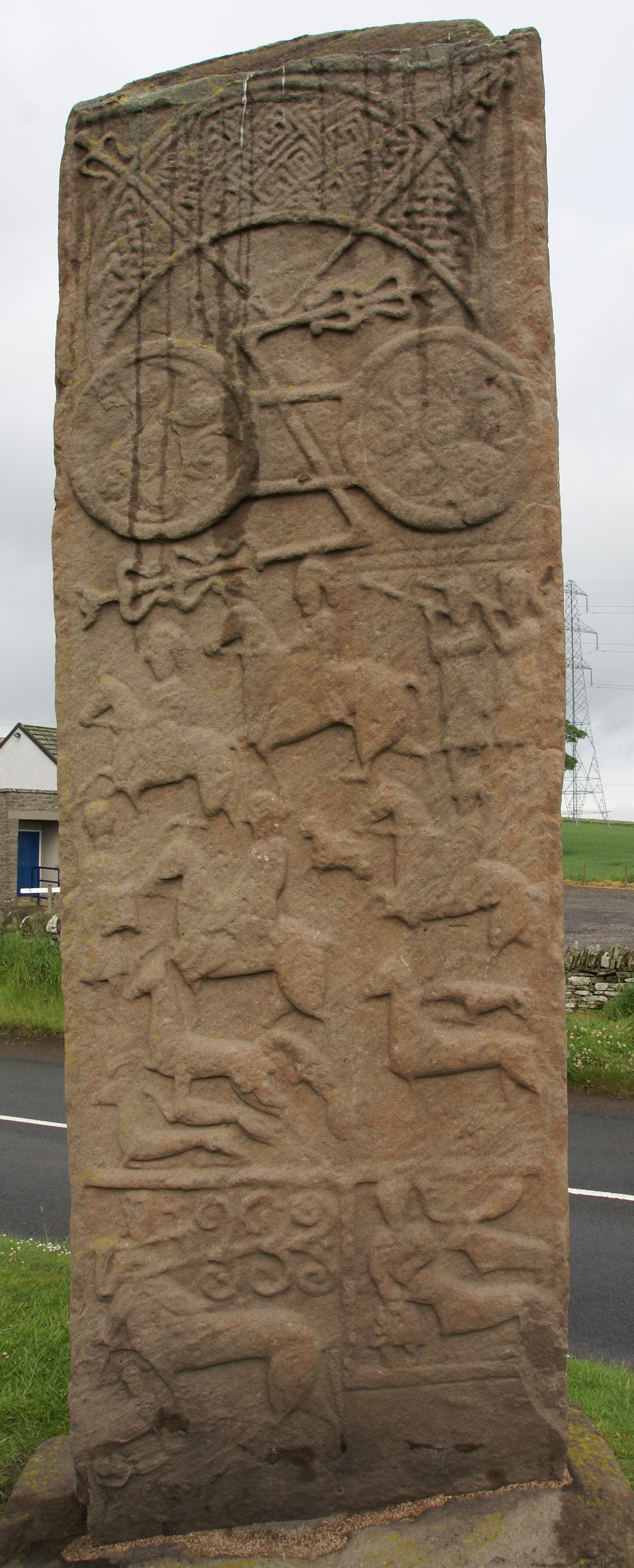
Aberlemno 3 rear face

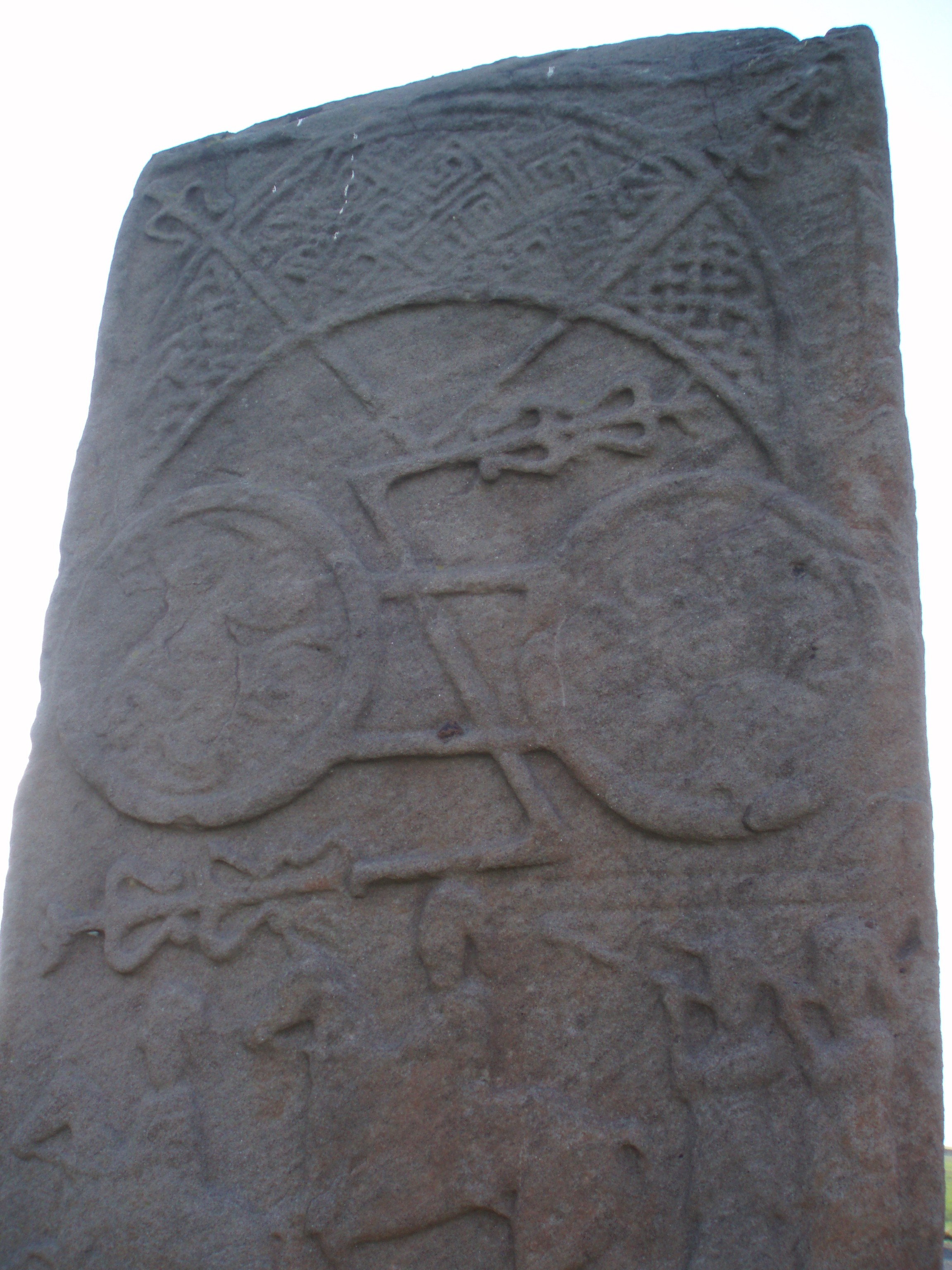
Aberlemno 3 rear detail

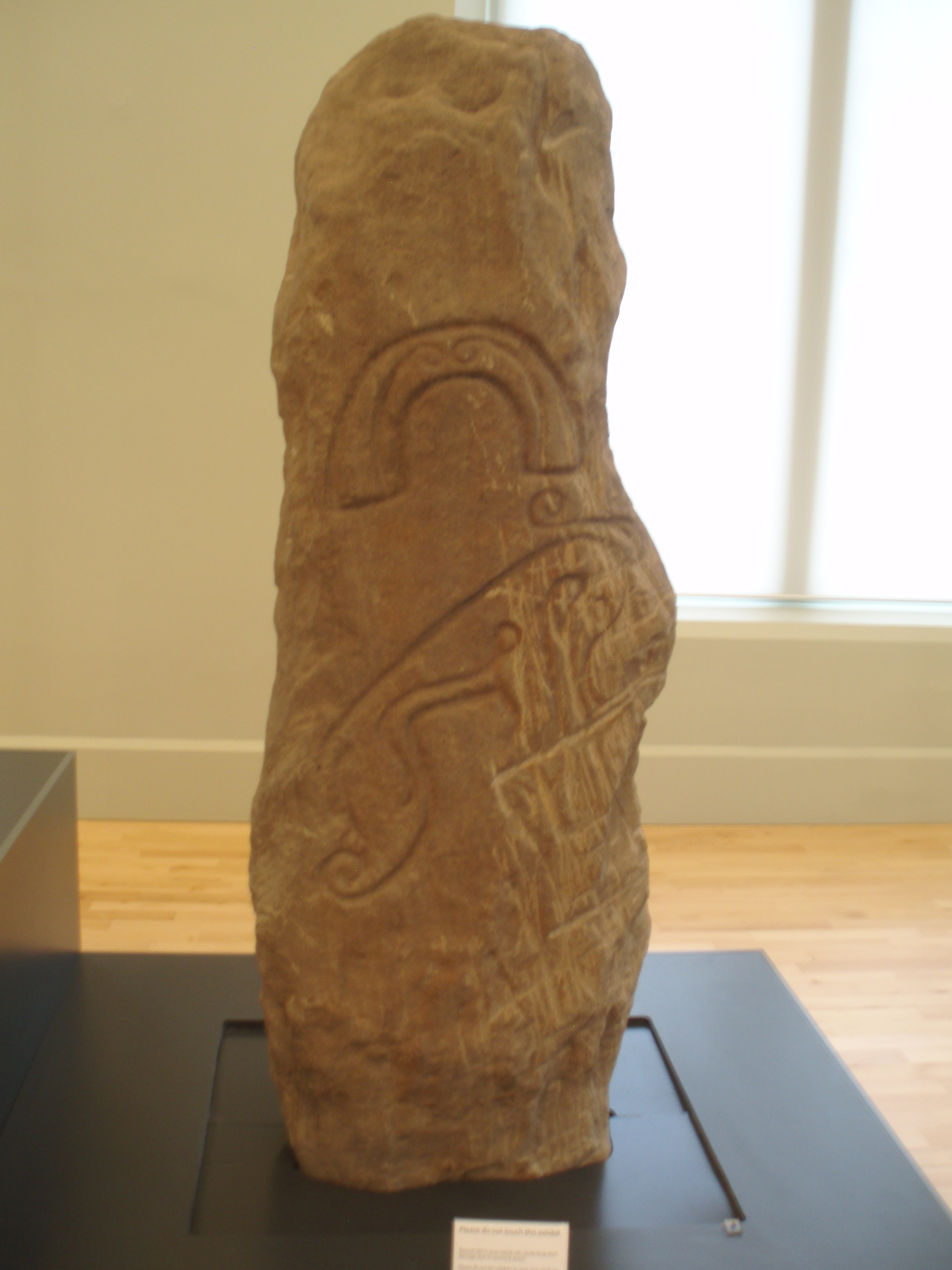
Aberlemno 4

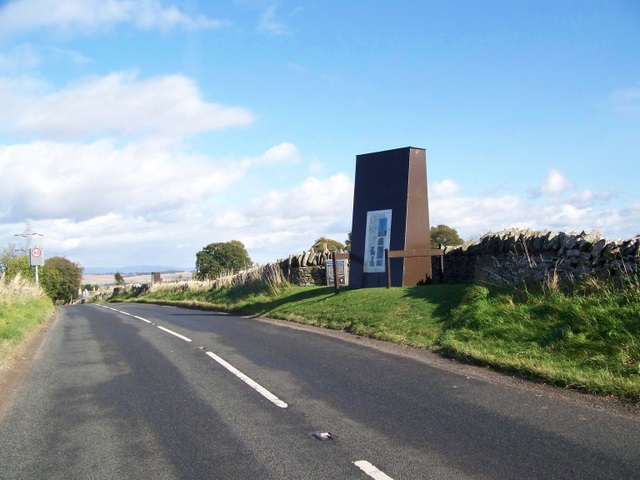
Stones boxed for the winter
