= Triple disc (Pictish symbol) =

Symbol found on Pictish stones

The triple disc is a Pictish symbol of unknown meaning, that is found on Class I and Class II Pictish stones. The symbol is found in various combinations with other symbols, notably with the crescent and v-rod. The symbol is constructed from a larger central circle flanked with two smaller circles on either side. It is sometimes shown with a "bar" bisecting all three circles.

== Gallery ==
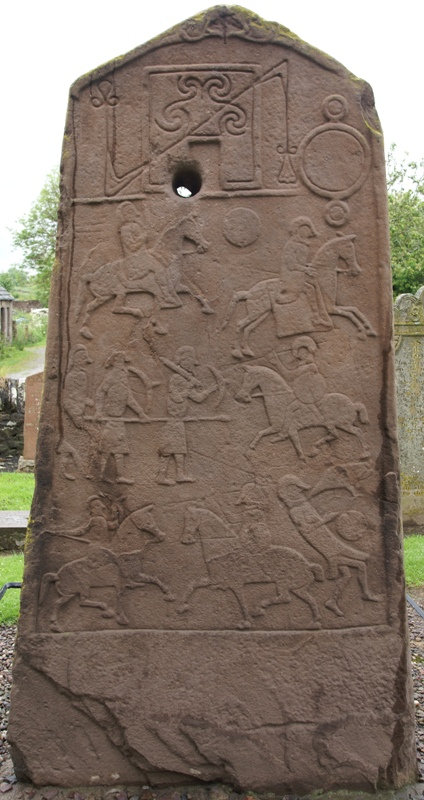
Aberlemno 2 rear face

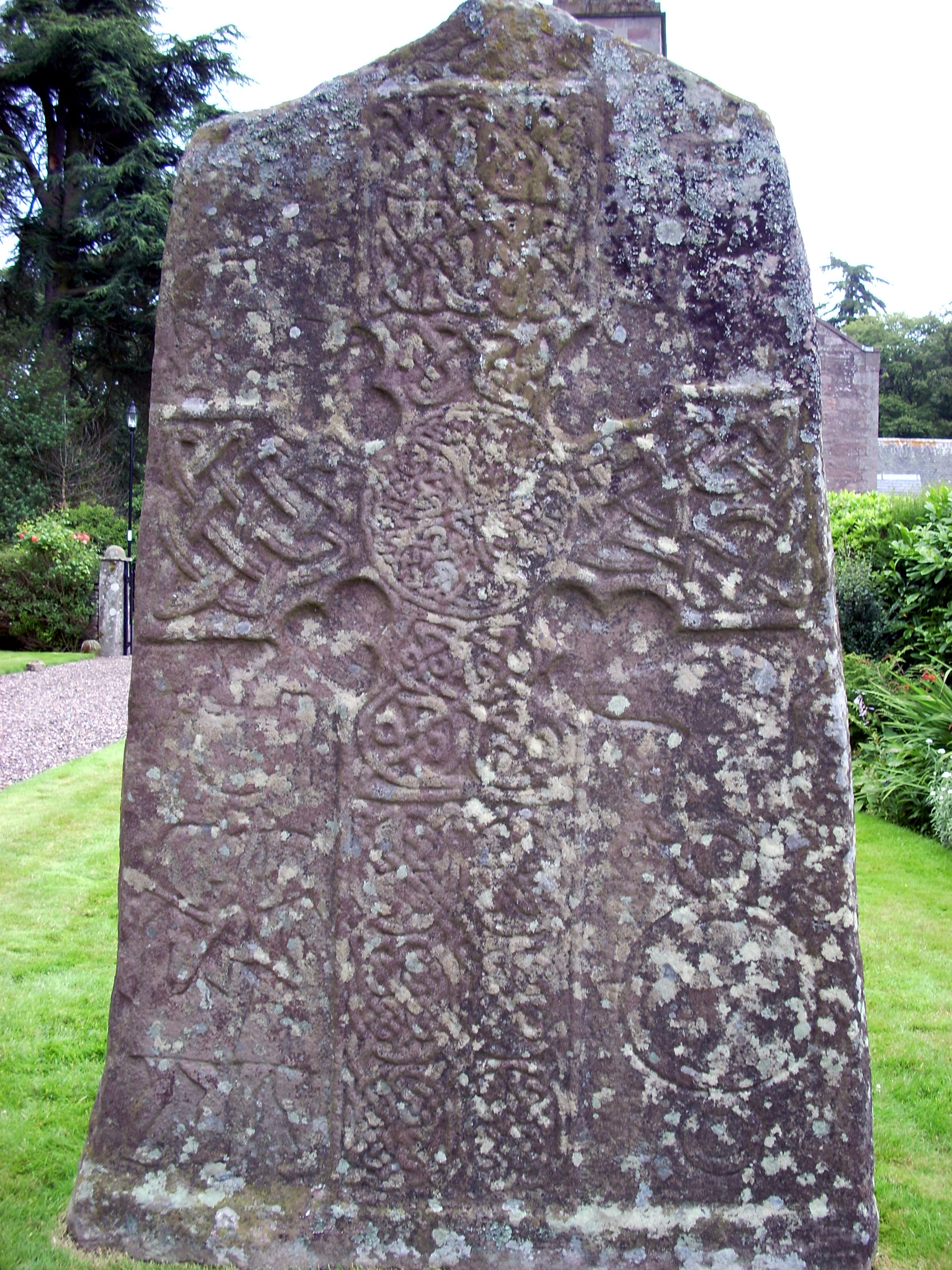
Glamis Manse Stone
