= Monifieth sculptured stones =

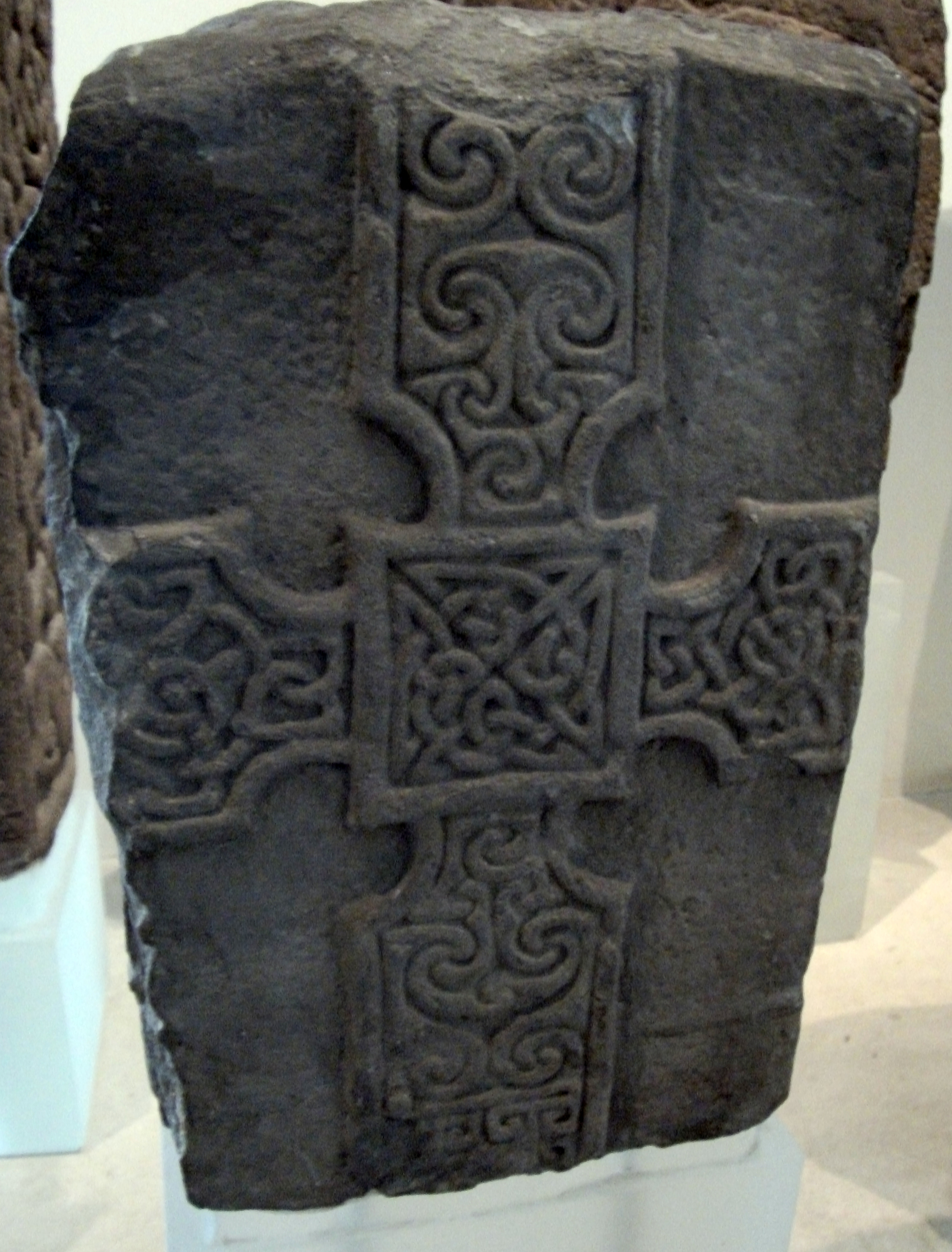
Monifieth 2, front face

The Monifieth Sculptured Stones are a series of five class II and III standing Pictish stones from the early Medieval period found in or around St Regulus' church in Monifieth, Angus, Scotland. Uncovered during the demolition of a pre-Reformation church and its kirkyard wall in the 19th and 20th centuries, the stones are now housed in the collection of the Museum of Scotland.

== Location ==
The stones known as Monifieth 1, 2, 3 and 4) were located at St Regulus' (St Rule's) Church, Monifieth, Angus, Scotland (grid reference NO49533235) until 1870, and Monifieth 5 until 1928. Monifieth 4 was possibly originally located at St Bride's Ring, Kingennie (grid reference NO47463536) and moved to Monifieth in pre-Reformation times.

All five are now housed in the collection of the Museum of Scotland, Edinburgh (grid reference NT257732).

== History ==
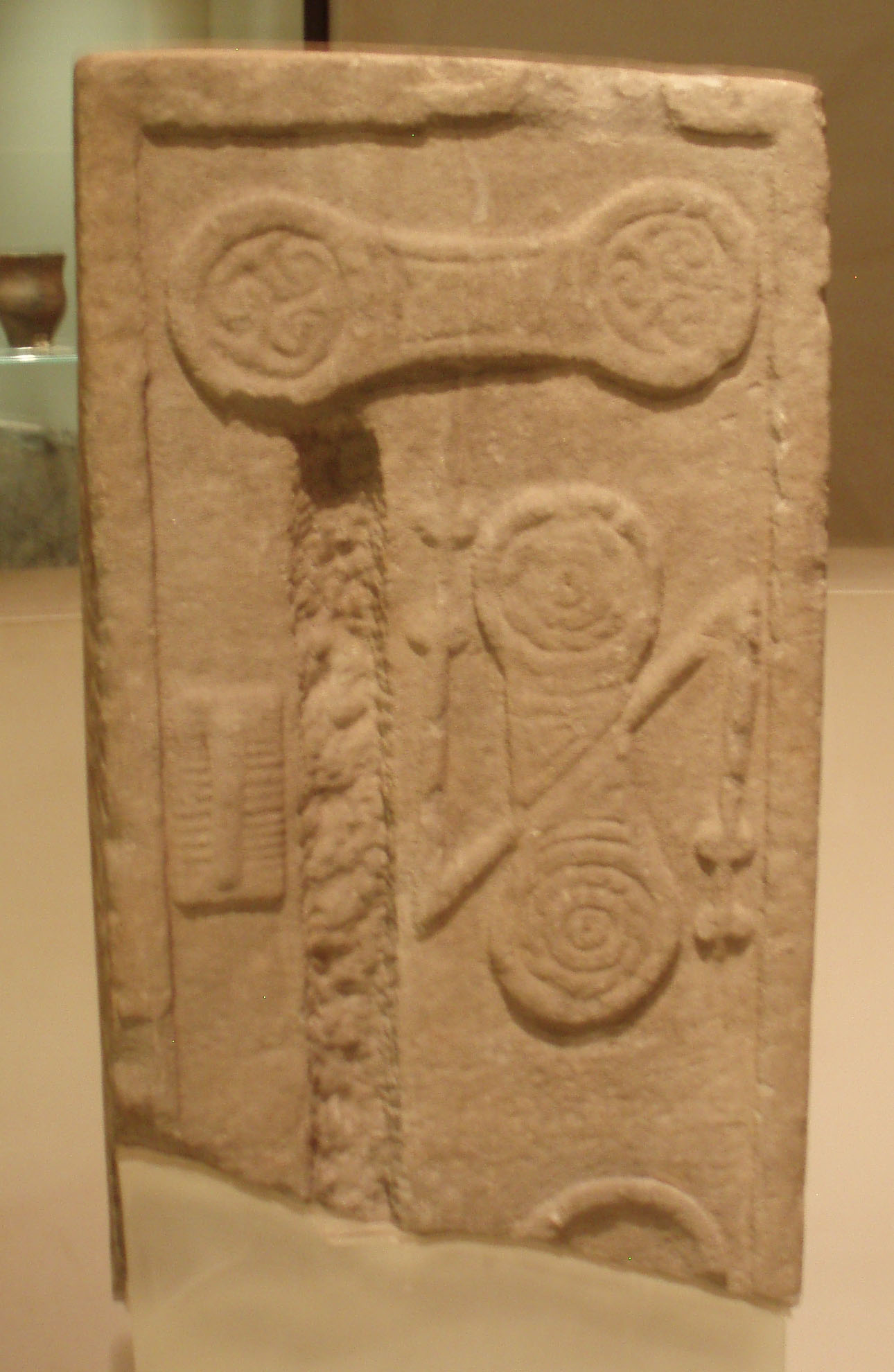
Monifieth 1, rear face

The church and lands of Monifieth were originally possessions of the ascetic Céli Dé monastic order. The church was endowed to the recently founded Arbroath Abbey by Gille Críst, Earl of Angus around 1201–1207, and the lands to the south of the Church (now much reduced in size due to erosion) in 1242–1243 by Matilda, Countess of Angus.

The materials of the Culdee buildings were apparently recycled when a new church building was erected at some point before the Reformation. This building was, in turn, demolished to make way for a new church in 1812. During the demolitions, "remains of the Culdee edifice" were found dating from before the church's acquisition by Arbroath Abbey. The pre-Reformation church also made use of the shaft of a high cross as a lintel for the "queer" door. According to Samuel Miller, minister at Monifieth during the time of the Second Statistical Account, this had been appropriated from a site several miles to the North at Kingennie, known as St Bride's Ring, the remains of a circular stone structure 30 metres in diameter, with walls 2 metres thick and 0.5 metres high. (grid reference NO47463536). Miller's account refers to a large socketed boulder, some yards to north that once held the cross. This stone is now known as Monifieth 4.

Of the artifacts found in the Church foundations, Jervise made note of two sculptured stones built into the fabric of the church walls. These two stones (now known as Monifieth 1 and Monifieth 2) were removed from the church walls to allow them to be sketched for John Stuart's The Sculptured Stones of Scotland, published in 1856. On a visit to the church by Cosmo Innes, Joseph Robertson and John Stuart in 1864, they were made aware of a fourth stone (Monifieth 3) that had been unearthed in a garden adjoining the church. These four stones were donated to the Museum of Antiquities (now part of the Museum of Scotland) in Edinburgh in 1870.

A further high cross fragment was later found incorporated into the kirkyard wall. This bears similarity with Monifieth 4 and was donated to the Museum of Antiquities in 1928.

== Description ==
=== Monifieth 1 ===
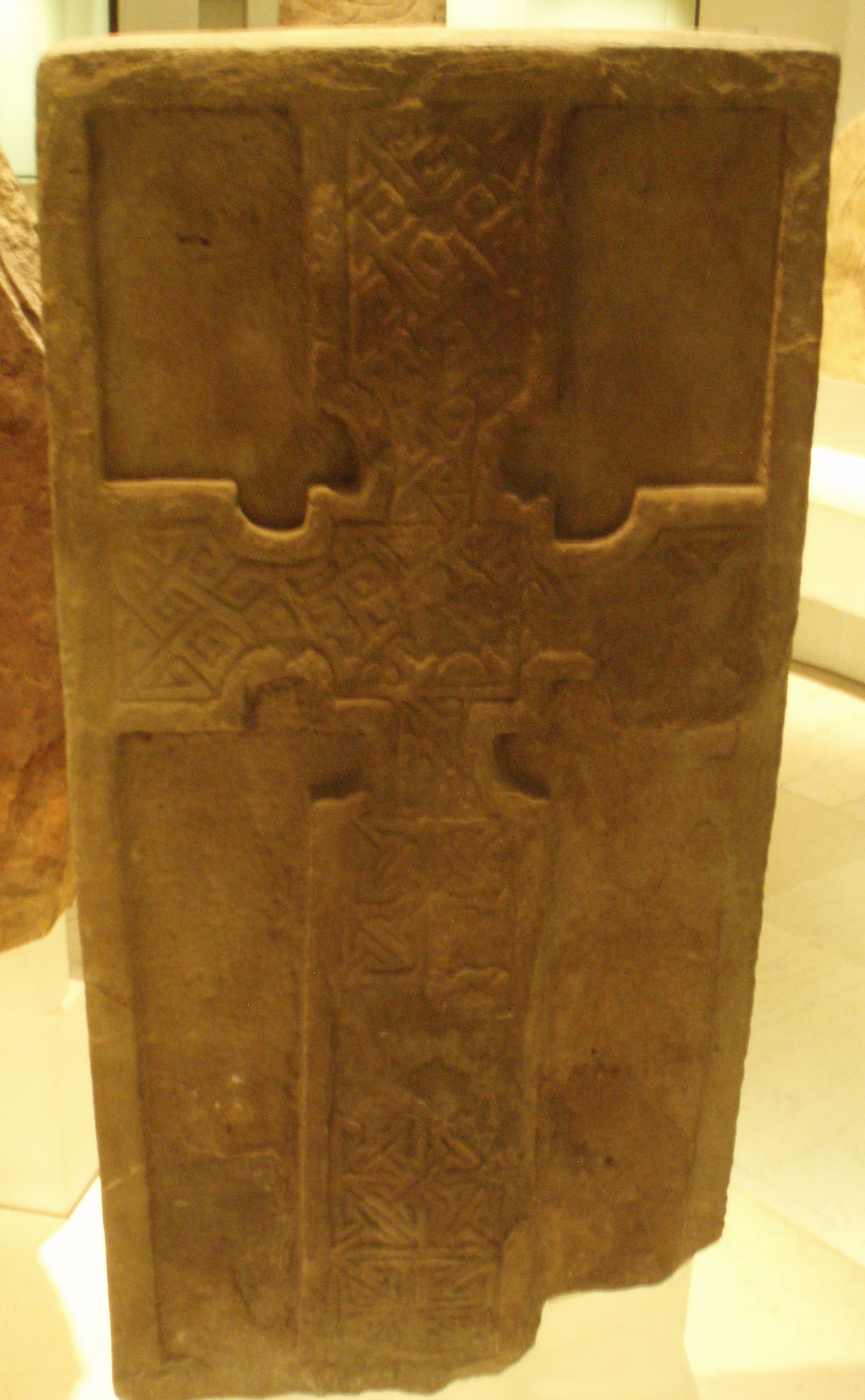
Monifeith 1 front

The stone is an upright slab of grey sandstone, 0.72 metres tall, 0.36 metres wide and 0.15 metres thick. It is dressed, with designs carved in relief including both Christian and Pictish symbols, defining it as a Class II cross slab under J. Romilly Allen and Joseph Anderson's classification system.

The front face of the stone bears a notched Quadrate cross decorated with keywork designs, surrounded by a thick border around the edge of the stone. The rear face is unique in having double disc symbols both with and without Z-rod ornamentation. The unornamented double disc lies horizontally at the top and is decorated with spiral designs. The double disc and Z-rod lies vertically on the right hand side of the face and is decorated with concentric circles. On the left of the face is a comb symbol and, lying between the comb and double disc and Z-rod, is an area of damage, where a long rectangular section had been removed when the stone was incorporated into the fabric of St Regulas' Church. The lower portion of the rear face is heavily damaged, but a portion of the edge of a circular symbol remains. Given the presence of a comb symbol, this may have originally represented a mirror, typical of the relatively common mirror and comb pairing. This face also features a heavy border around the edge.

=== Monifieth 2 ===
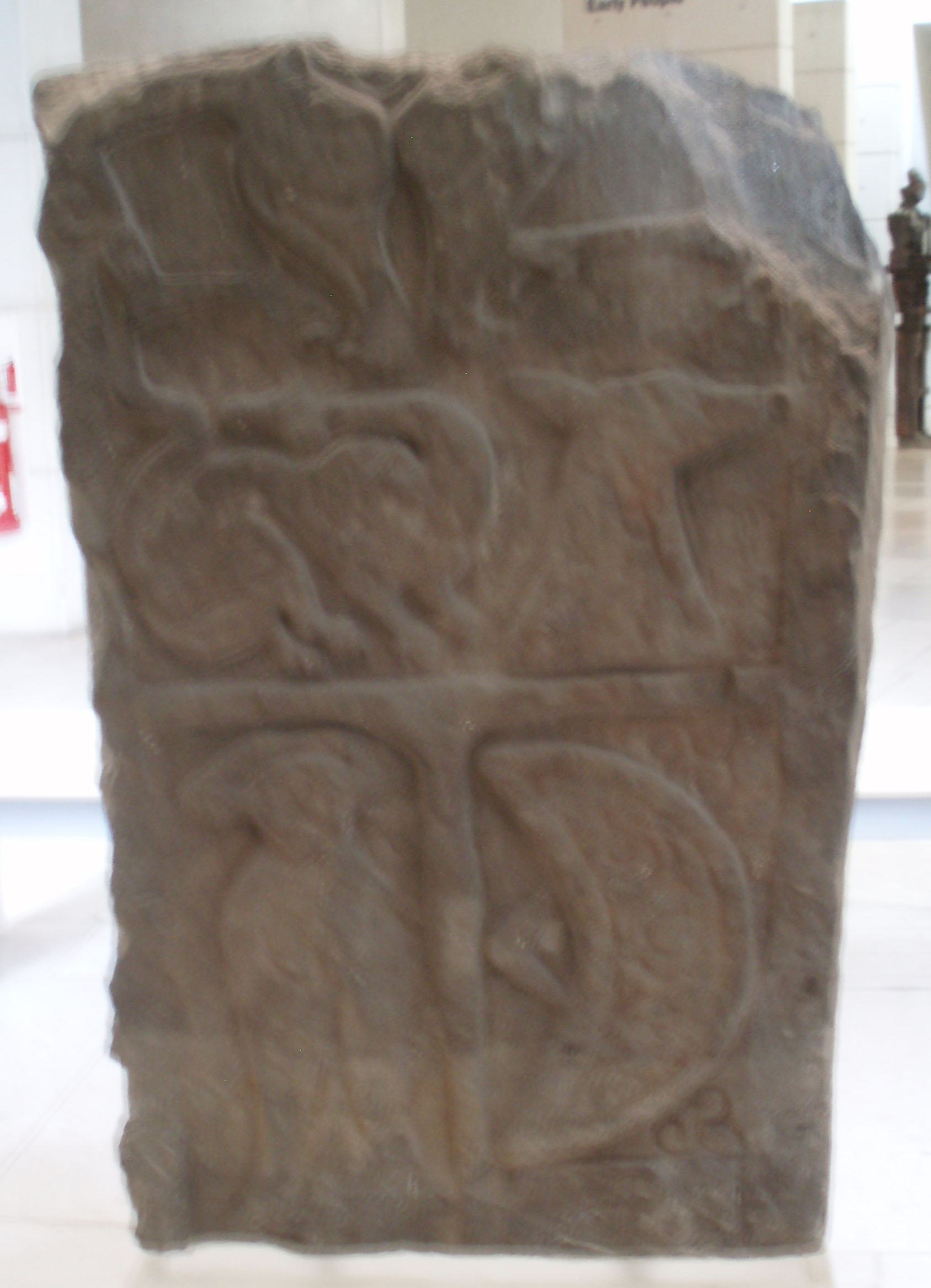
Monifeith 2 rear

Monifieth 2 is another class II cross slab of grey sandstone, 0.45 metres tall by 0.3 metres wide by 0.08 metres thick. It has substantial areas of wear to the rear.

The front again features a notched quadrate cross, with the central section featuring an angular knotwork design. The arms also have knotworks, whereas the shaft features a spiral design above a small keywork and the head has a further spiral design. On the rear face there are a variety of symbols. There are bird headed creatures incorporated into the upper border of the slab. The upper half of the slab holds two designs: on the left, a long-necked creature similar to that on one of the sides of Monifieth 4; on the right, a deer's head similar to that on the Class I stone at Dunachton and the Class II Glamis Manse stone. The lower right quadrant of the slab has a crescent and v-rod design and the lower left holds a worn figure, cloaked and bearing a halo, recently identified as the virgin Mary.

=== Monifieth 3 ===
Another type II cross slab, Monifieth 3 is 0.45 metres by 0.58 metres by 0.08 metres. The front face features a defaced cross shaft with birds and animals at the sides. The rear features a figure on horseback, a crescent symbol, dog, fish monster, a dog chasing a stag and a pair of biting heads. (The Historic Environment Record record is at odds with Neish's account of the donation, stating that Monifieth 3 was also found in the church foundations and incorporated into the 1812 building.)

=== Monifieth 4 ===
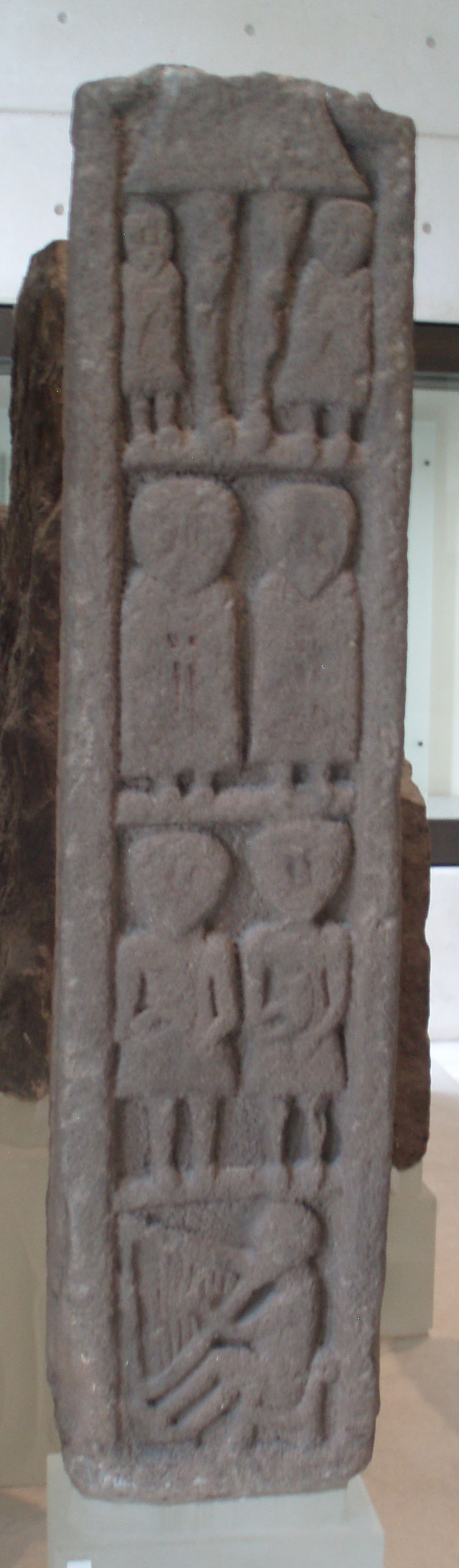
Monifeith 4 front

The largest stone is a fragment of a free-standing high cross, 1.16 metres by 0.28 metres wide by 0.18 metres thick, once built into the front of St Regulus' Church and possibly originally from St Bride's Ring. While it features Celtic Christian imagery, it has no idiomatic Pictish symbols, defining it as Class III. The cross is broken at bottom of intersection with the arms. The upper portion of the front face is a crucifixion scene, with the portion of the Christ figure above the waist missing. Flanking his legs are two human figures. Below the crucifixion scene are two robed figures holding unidentifiable objects. Below them are a further two figures holding drinking horns and the bottom of the cross has a seated harpist, similar to that on the Dupplin Cross.

The rear face features a ringed knotwork design above a back-biting creature. The sides of the cross also feature knotwork designs, above phantasmagorical creatures.

=== Monifieth 5 ===
Monifieth 5 is another class III high cross fragment, broken under the arms. It measures 0.5 metres long, 0.2 metres wide and 0.1 metres thick. The front again features part of a crucifixion scene, with the Christ figure broken off at the waist. Flanking his legs are two figures. The lower part of the cross shaft is worn and any decoration has been worn away. The rear of the cross shaft is also too worn to interpret.
