= John Romilly Allen =

British archaeologist (1847–1907)

John Romilly Allen FSA FSAScot (9 June 1847 – 5 July 1907) was a British archaeologist.

== Life ==
Allen was the son of George Baugh Allen. He was educated at King's College School, Rugby and King's College London. In 1867 he was articled to George Fosbery Lyster, engineer in chief to the Mersey Docks and Harbour Board, with whom he remained until 1870. He was next employed as resident engineer to the Persian railways of Baron de Reuter and afterwards in supervising the construction of docks at Leith and at Boston, Lincolnshire.

Meanwhile, Allen was interested in archaeology; and he spent the rest of his life on it, and particularly on the study of prehistoric antiquities and of pre-Norman art in Great Britain. His earliest contribution was to Archæologia Cambrensis ("A description of some cairns on Barry Island"), appearing in April 1873; he joined the Cambrian Archaeological Association in 1875, was elected a member of the general committee in 1877, became one of two editors of its Journal in 1889, and was sole editor from 1892 until his death. Having begun with the antiquities of Wales, Allen from 1880 gave attention to those of Scotland also; in 1883 he was elected fellow of the Scottish Society of Antiquaries, and in 1885 was Rhind Lecturer in archaeology in the University of Edinburgh. In England, he became fellow of the Society of Antiquaries of London in 1896, editor of the Reliquary and Illustrated Archæologist in 1893; and Yates Lecturer in archæology in University College, London, for 1898.

Allen was unmarried, and during his later years made his home in London, where he died on 5 July 1907.

== Works ==
In addition to contributions to archaeological journals, Allen published:

1. Theory and Practice in the Designs and Construction of Dock Walls, 1876.
2. Early Christian Symbolism in Great Britain and Ireland (Rhind Lectures), 1887.
3. The Monumental History of the Early British Church, 1889.
4. The Early Christian Monuments of Scotland, Edinburgh, 1903.
5. Celtic Art in Pagan and Christian Times, 1904.
