= Largo, Fife =

Coordinates: 56.214°N 2.941°W

Largo
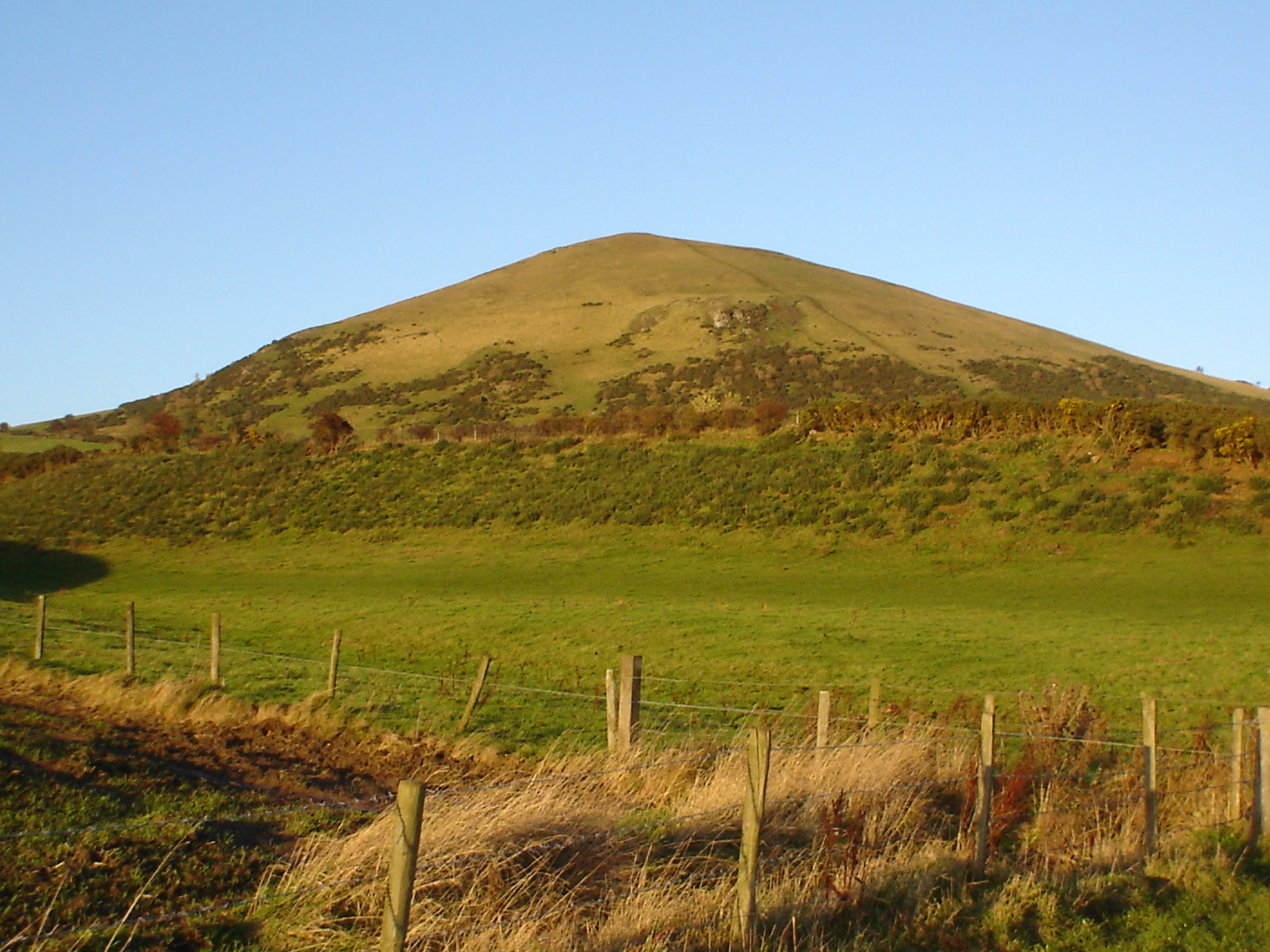
- Largo Law, a mile north of Upper Largo, highest point of parish

- Location within Fife
- Population: 2,524
- OS grid reference: NO4171402564
- Council area: Fife
- Lieutenancy area: Fife
- Country: Scotland
- Sovereign state: United Kingdom
- Post town: Leven
- Postcode district: KY8
- Dialling code: 01333
- Police: Scotland
- Fire: Scottish
- Ambulance: Scottish
- UK Parliament: North East Fife
- Scottish Parliament: Mid Fife and Glenrothes

Largo (Scottish Gaelic: An Leargach) is a parish in Fife, Scotland containing the villages of Upper Largo or Kirkton of Largo, Lower Largo and Lundin Links. It is bounded on the west by the parish of Scoonie, on the north by Ceres and on the east by the parishes of Newburn and Kilconquhar. It has a coastline of 2¾ miles along Largo bay. Inland it extends 3-4 ½ miles north from the south coast of Fife. Area 7,378 acres.

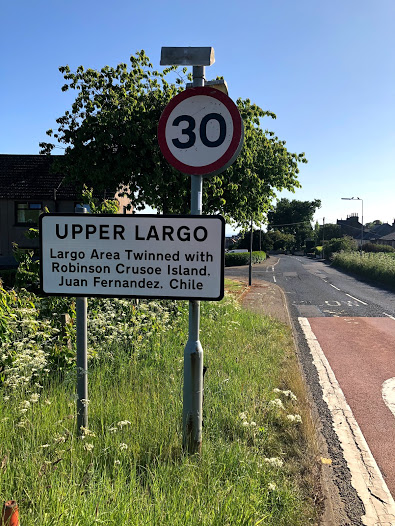

Near the eastern edge of the parish is situated Largo Law, height 953 ft., a conical hill of volcanic origin, whose summit provides an extensive view of the surrounding area and across the Firth of Forth to the Lothians. West of Largo Law is a deep ravine, through which flows a small burn, intersecting the parish from north to south for 2 miles.

The name "Largo" comes from the Scottish Gaelic word for hillside: Learg; a reference to the area being on the slopes of Largo Law. The original name was recorded as Leargach, with the 'ach' element being an early Gaelic place suffix.

The Norrie's Law hoard was found here in 1817, containing Roman and Pictish silver objects. Most was lost to bullion scrap, but the surviving pieces are now in the Museum of Scotland.

== Church and mansion ==
The church of the parish is situated in Upper Largo and dates from 1817, although it includes stonework from the earlier church dated 1623. The manse, which stands close by the west side of the Church, dates from 1760-1770, being considerably enlarged in 1822.

The estate of Largo was once the most extensive in the parish, with a mansion, Largo House, about a mile west of the church in Kirkton of Largo. The Barony of Largo was conferred by James III in 1482 on Sir Andrew Wood, his naval commander, in recognition of his victories over the English. Sir Andrew caused a canal to be built from his mansion almost down to the church, thus enabling him to arrive by barge at the church each Sunday. Traces of the canal may be seen behind the manse.

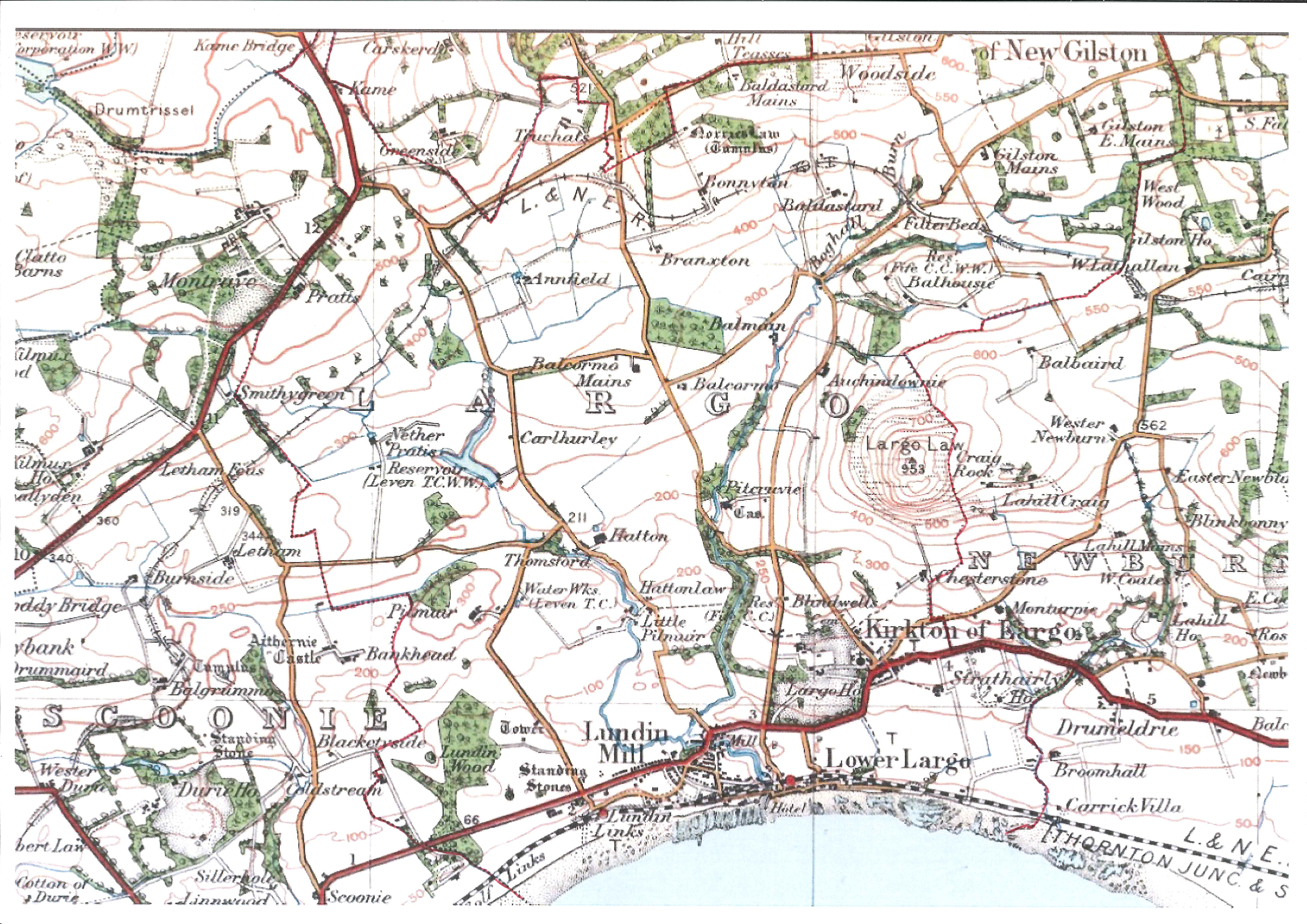
Parish of Largo, 1927 (parish boundary shown in red)

Largo House built in 1750 is now a ruin. During the second World War it served as headquarters of the Polish Parachute Brigade and in 1951 the roof was removed to avoid local property taxation. Immediately west of Largo House, near Lundin Links, was Lundin House, site of the Lundin estate originating from the grant of a Barony to Philip de Lundin by Malcolm IV.

In the northern part of the parish lies New Gilston, a village 3 miles north of Upper Largo, surrounded by agricultural land. It has the distinction of being the highest inhabited village in Fife. The hamlet of Woodside is a short distance to the west.

The population of the parish in 1755 was 1,396, 1,867 in 1801 and grew to 2,500 in 1951. The civil parish now has a population of 2,524 (in 2011).

Civil parishes in Scotland, as units of local government, were abolished in 1929. but have been used later for census purposes.

Largo Area Community Council covers approximately the same area as Largo civil parish, plus Newburn to the east. Similarly, Largo parish is united with Newburn for church purposes.
