= Margaret Hardie =

Scottish Tenant Farmer

- Born: Margaret Lylestoun c. 1625; Westruther, Berwickshire
- Died: after 1660
- Occupation: Tenant farmer
- Spouse: Thomas Hardie (1643-)

Margaret Hardie n. Lylestoun (c.1625 to after 1660) was a tenant farmer from Westruther, Berwickshire in Scotland.

== Early life ==
Margaret Lylestoun was born around 1625 in Westruther, Berwickshire.

Aged 18, she married Thomas Hardie, a tenant farmer who worked the Midside part of Tollishill Farm, which formed part of the estates of John Maitland, the Earl of Lauderdale.

Six years of bad weather blighted their work on the land. On the seventh year, the couple's entire flock of sheep had died. The couple faced ruin and starvation. Thomas was ready to give up and seek work elsewhere when the rent became due. Margaret Hardie was not moved to give up however, and sought to appeal to the Earl of Lauderdale to allow the rent 'to stand over.'

Aged 25, Hardie hiked the 9 miles to Lauder to see whether the Earl would allow her an audience so she could beg for leniency on the rent.

== Meeting with the Earl of Lauderdale ==
The Earl grudgingly gave her an audience at Thirlstane Castle in the Scottish Borders whereupon Hardie spoke about the heavy snow that caused so much hardship and the lean years they had endured on the land. In response to what he viewed as the audacity of the request, the Earl flippantly asked her to produce a snowball, in lieu of the rent, on Midsummer's Day so he might have proof of what she said. If she could do that, he would forego his rent on this occasion.

Hardie travelled back to the farm and told her husband what had occurred. The pair then collected a large amount of snow discovered still lying in a deep ravine on the hill. Carrying it to back to the Earl at Thirlestane Castle, enough of the large amount of snow they had collected has survived the hike back unmelted, that they had fulfilled their part of the bargain and were able to show him the snowball, as requested, clutched in Maggie's hands on Midsummer’s Day. The Earl was forced to keep his word.

After that, the Hardies' years on the farm were prosperous.

== Later life and death ==
During the English Civil War, the Earl was captured by Cromwell's troops at the Battle of Worcester and confined in the Tower of London for nine years on account of his staunch loyal support of King Charles II.

Once imprisoned, his tenants back home saw no reason to pay their rent to the Earl now that he'd been brandished a rebel landlord. All except Margaret Hardie. She kept her rent money aside as gold coins and baked a bannock, traditional Scottish type of circular, flat bread, to hide the coins in. Having done this, Hardie walked a much longer journey this time, from Berwickshire all the way south to London, and was able to secure an audience once again and hand the bannock over to the imprisoned Earl.

When the hungry Earl broke the bannock open, the gold coins of 9 years' rent fell to the floor and he was able to use them to buy his freedom and secure his release from the Tower. Upon the restoration of King Charles II, the Earl was fully restored to his Lauderdale estate. Indeed, the king improved his status from Earl to Duke, and later by made him a Knight of the Order of the Thistle.

The Earl never forgot Hardie's courage and kindness and, upon his return to Scotland, he presented her with a treasured silver girdle, to be won about the waist, by way of thanks. This girdle now resides in the National Museum of Scotland, in Edinburgh. By way of further thanks, the Earl allowed the Hardie family to live out their lives on their farm rent-free.

Margaret Hardie died sometime after 1660.
