= Norrie's Law hoard =

Early Medieval silver hoard found in Fife, Scotland

Norrie's Law Hoard
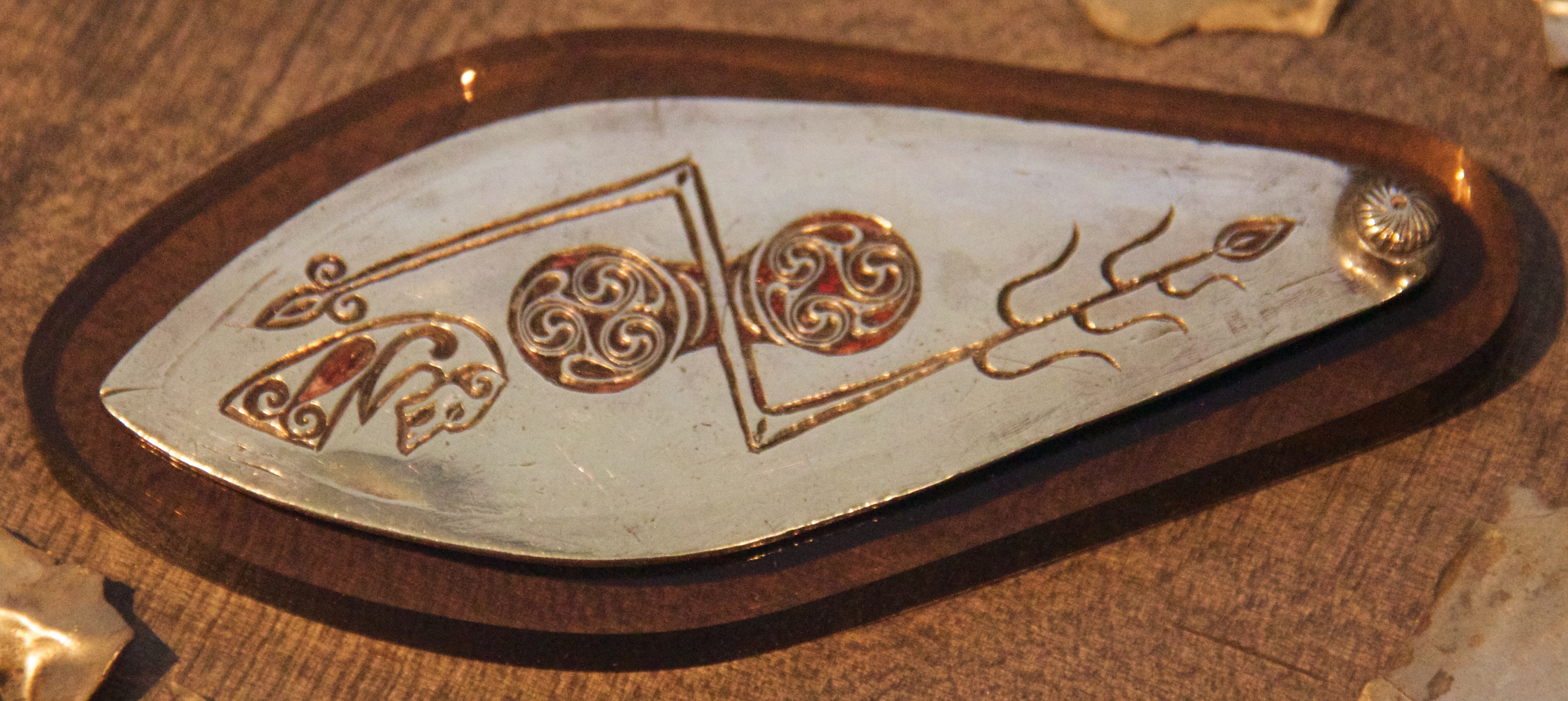
- Silver plaque, Norrie's Law Hoard
- Material: Silver
- Created: c.500 - 600 AD
- Discovered: c.1819 Upper Largo, Scotland; 56.2553°N 2.9522°W
- Present location: National Museum of Scotland

Norrie's Law hoard is a sixth century silver hoard discovered in 1819 at a small mound in Largo, Fife, Scotland. Found by an unknown person or persons, most of the hoard was illegally sold or given away, and has disappeared. Remaining items of the hoard were found later at the mound, and were turned over to the landowner, General Philip Durham. The surviving 170 pieces from the hoard are now in the National Museum of Scotland. The treasure consists mostly of hacksilver and includes four complete silver pieces. Both Roman and much rarer Pictish objects are among the survivals.

== Description ==
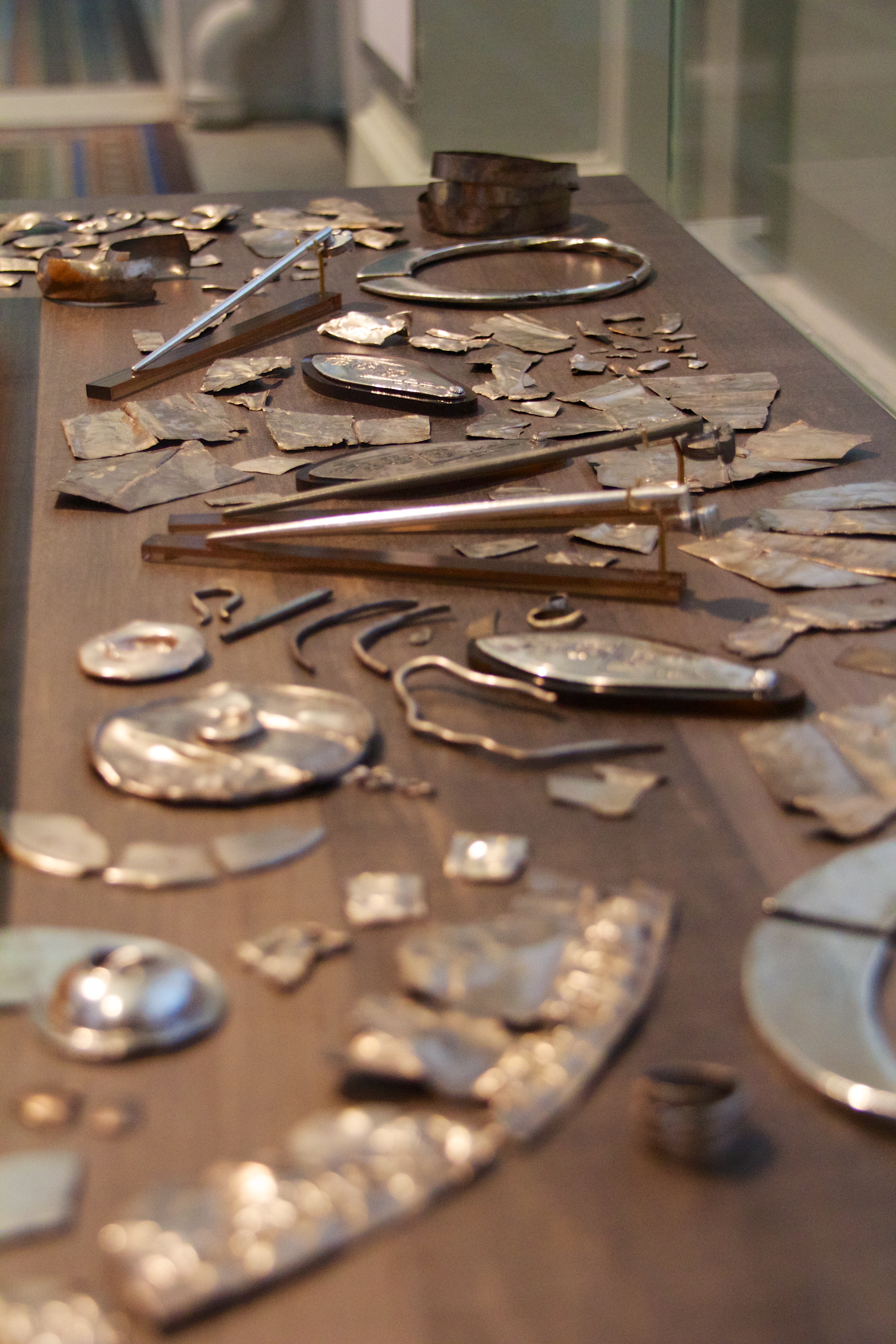
Norrie's Law hoard

Norrie's Law hoard is one of the largest Pictish hoards ever to be found. The hoard originally contained 12.5 kg (28 lb) of late Roman and Pictish silver. Less than 1 kg (2.2 lb) of the hoard remains. Consisting of 170 pieces of primarily hacksilver, the treasure also contains complete silver metalwork, including a penannular brooch, a leaf-shaped oval plaque with Pictish symbols, a large hand-pin, and a worn spiral finger-ring. Incomplete items include part of a Roman spoon, pieces of silver sheet from a plate and incomplete spiral bracelets. The hoard's pieces of cut and folded silver were used for their silver bullion value and were often traded or recycled into new objects. The hoard also contained two Late Roman coins which were melted down and sold soon after the initial discovery.

== History ==
The hoard was found in 1819 by an unknown discoverer or discoverers at a small tumulus known as Norrie's Law, which is located on the Largo Estate in Fife. The mound was built of stones and sat on an elevated bank of sand and gravel. The discovery occurred while the anonymous finder(s) were digging sand at the base of the mound. The silver found at the site was given to a peddler who later sold most of the items as scrap silver to be melted down. Some of the items were given away.

The landowner, General Durham, learned of the hoard after most of the silver had been sold off. He was able to locate the remaining items of the hoard that had not been uncovered in the first excavation. Durham kept the discovery of the treasure secret for 20 years. In 1839 a local antiquarian, George Buist, investigated local accounts of the hoard and published an account of the discovery for the local archaeological society. Buist had pewter copies made of two objects from the hoard, the decorated plaque and the large hand-pin. General Durham died in 1845 without descendants. The Largo estate passed to Lilas Dundas Calderwood Durham (Mrs Robert Dundas of Arniston), who donated most of the surviving hoard pieces to the Museum of Society of Antiquaries of Scotland, now the National Museum of Scotland, in 1864. The remainder of the hoard was donated to the museum by her heir, Robert Dundas of Arniston, in 1883.

The fourth century Roman coins from the hoard suggest that it must have been buried sometime after the early fifth century AD. More recent research conducted by the Glenmorangie Research Project at the National Museum of Scotland date the hoard to the sixth century AD. The study also determined that two silver copies of the hoard items were made around 1839. The silver copies of the Pictish-decorated plaque and large hand-pin were believed until recently to be original early medieval metalwork.

== See also ==
- St Ninian's Isle Treasure
- Whitecleuch Chain
- Traprain Law treasure
- List of hoards in Great Britain
