= Whitecleuch Chain =

Pictish silver ornamant chain

Coordinates: 55.4576°N 3.8818°W

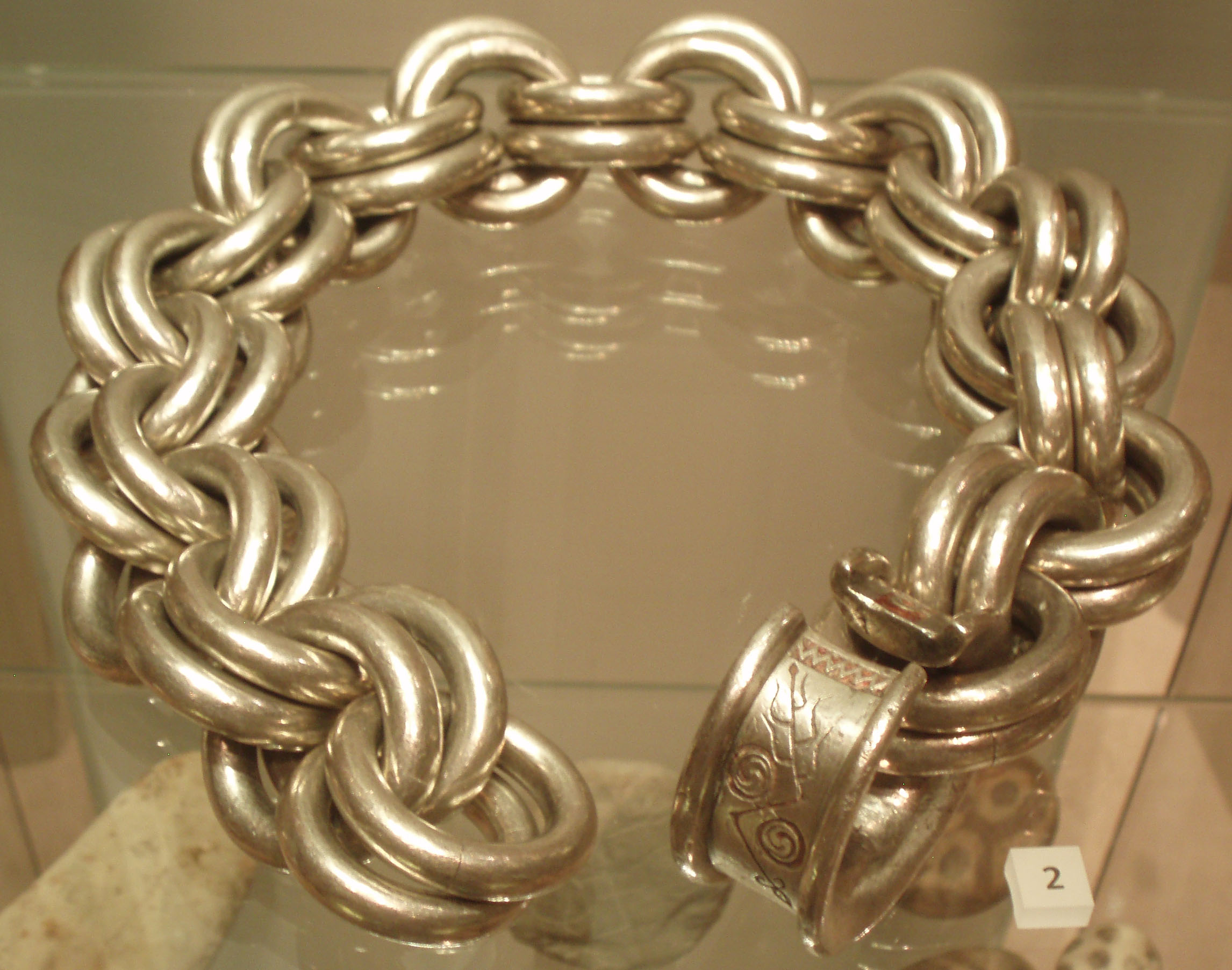
The Whitecleuch Chain

The Whitecleuch Chain is a large Pictish silver chain that was found in Whitecleuch, Lanarkshire, Scotland, in 1869. A high status piece, it is likely to have been worn as a choker neck ornament for ceremonial purposes. It dates from around 400 to 800 AD.

The chain is one of ten certain examples of this type, and is on display at the National Museum of Scotland, Edinburgh.

== Description ==
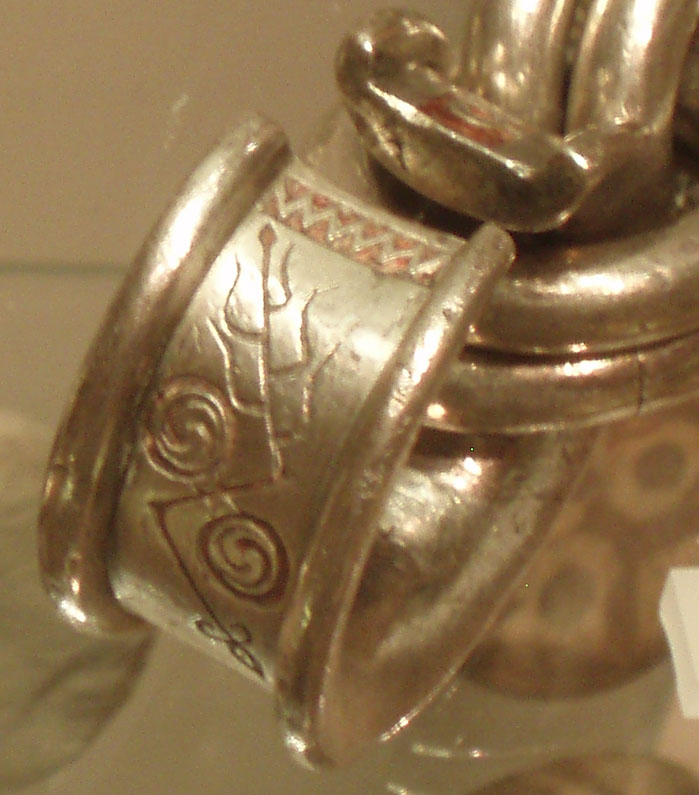
Detail of penannular ring, with Pictish symbols

Weighing 1.8 kg and measuring approximately 50 cm in length, the chain consists of 44 silver rings interlinked into 22 pairs. According to Clark, the chain originally had 23 pairs of rings, but was damaged subsequent to its discovery.

The paired ring chain is joined by a large penannular piece with expanded flanges. The penannular ring bears Pictish symbols of the sort typically found on Class I and II Pictish standing stones. On one side of the opening in the ring, there is a zigzag pattern and a double disc and Z-rod symbol, bearing similarity to those on the silver plaques found in the Norrie's Law hoard. On the other side of the opening, there is a notched rectangle symbol, decorated with a pair of circles, running lengthwise along the rectangle and attached to opposite edges of the rectangle. This design is similar to that found on a stone found at Westfield, Falkland as well as a number of notched rectangles that are further decorated with Z-rods. The penannular ring was apparently used as a fastener to link the terminal ends of the chain together into a choker neck ornament.

== Findspot ==
Locations:

– Location of Whitecleuch within South Lanarkshire, where the chain was found

The Whitecleuch chain was found in May 1869 on land belonging to the Duke of Buccleuch at Whitecleuch, Lanarkshire, Scotland. The initial report, made by Smith (1874), described the location of the find as being "in the vicinity of Drumlanrig Castle" in Dumfries and Galloway. The precise location was later clarified as being 12 miles north of the castle, in pasture land known as Rough Flow Moss, Whitecleuch.(grid reference NS811198). This has caused a certain amount of confusion, with both sites being listed in some censuses of Pictish chains.

The chain was found at a depth of around 45 cm in the ground and was exposed by erosion of the edges of a drainage ditch. The location of the find in the South West of Scotland, some distance from the Pictish territory is of no real significance due to the portable nature of the chain.

== Gallery ==
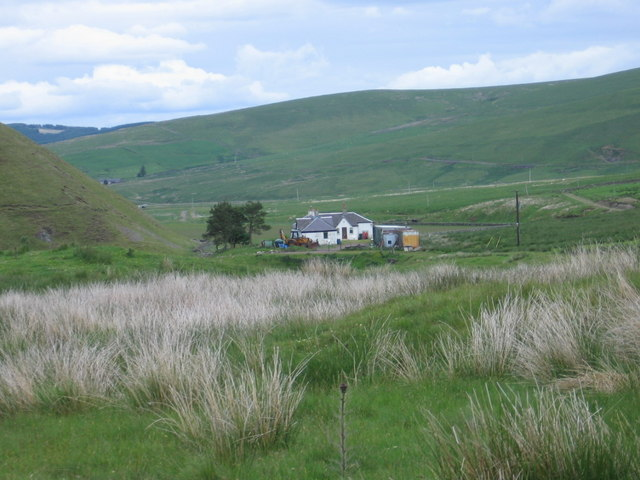
Whitecleuch Farm, where the chain was discovered

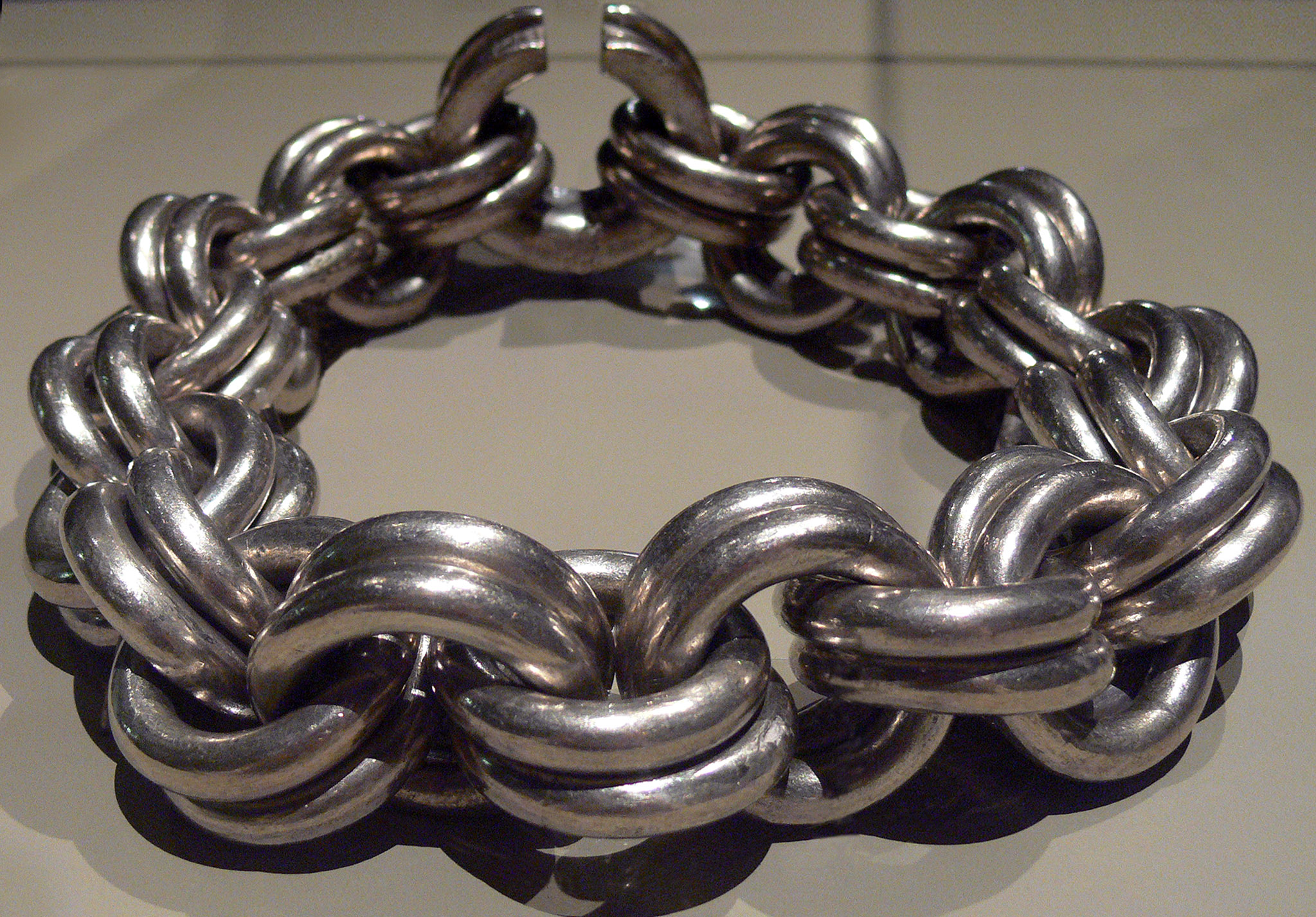
Chain ends linked together by penannular ring to form choker.
