= National Museum of Scotland =

Museum in Edinburgh, Scotland

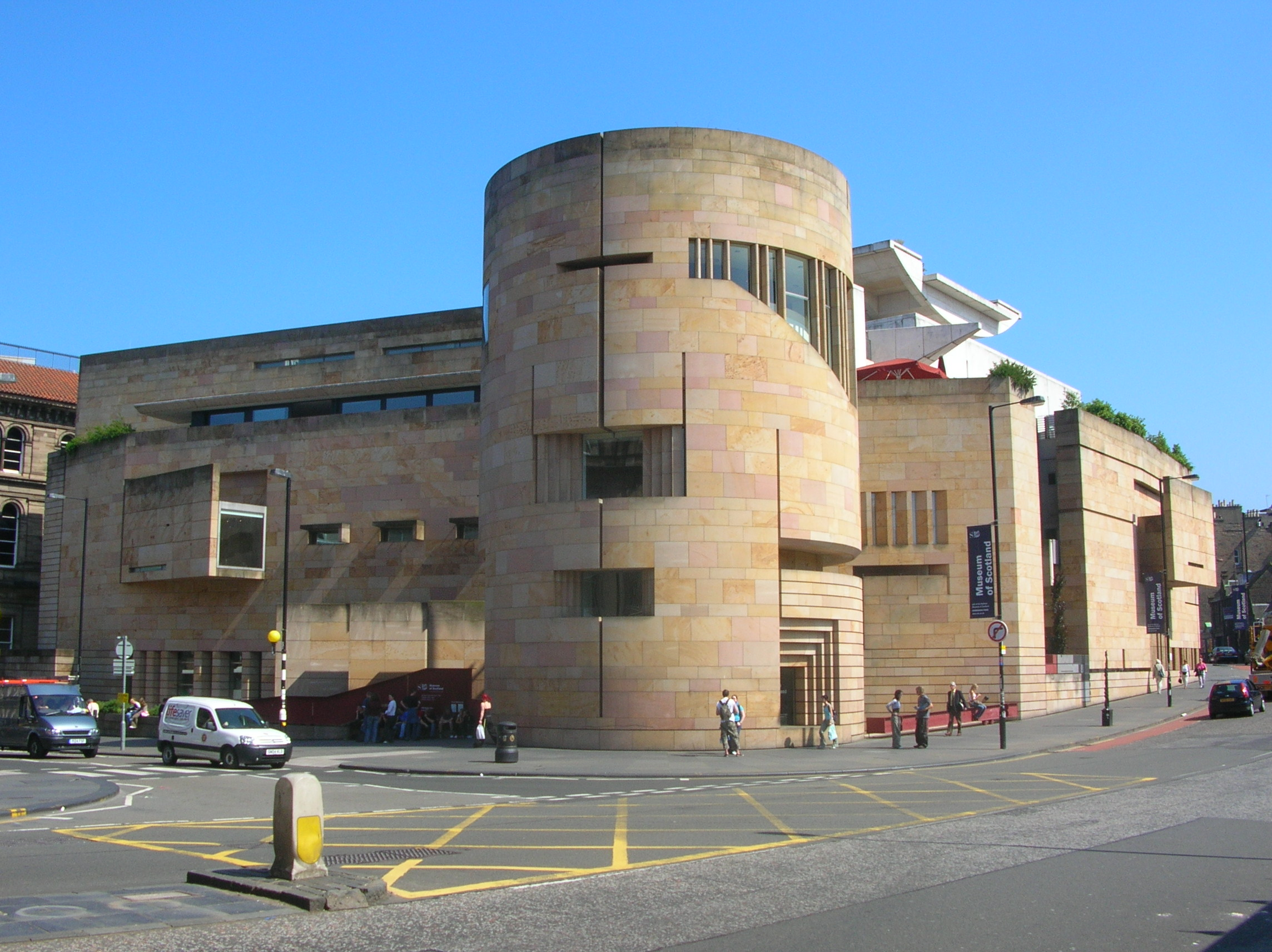
- Scottish History and Archaeology department, opened in 1998 with collections from the National Museum of Antiquities of Scotland

- Location within Edinburgh city centre

General information
- Architectural style: Victorian Venetian Renaissance and modern
- Location: Chambers Street, Edinburgh, Scotland
- Coordinates: 55°56′49″N 3°11′24″W
- Construction started: 1861
- Completed: 1866 and 1998
- Inaugurated: 1866
- Renovated: 2011

Design and construction
- Architect: Benson & Forsyth
- Structural engineer: Anthony Hunt Associates

Other information
- Public transit: Edinburgh Waverley

Website
- www.nms.ac.uk/national-museum-of-scotland/

Listed Building – Category A
- Official name: 44 Chambers Street, The National Museum of Scotland
- Designated: 14 December 1970
- Reference no.: LB27748

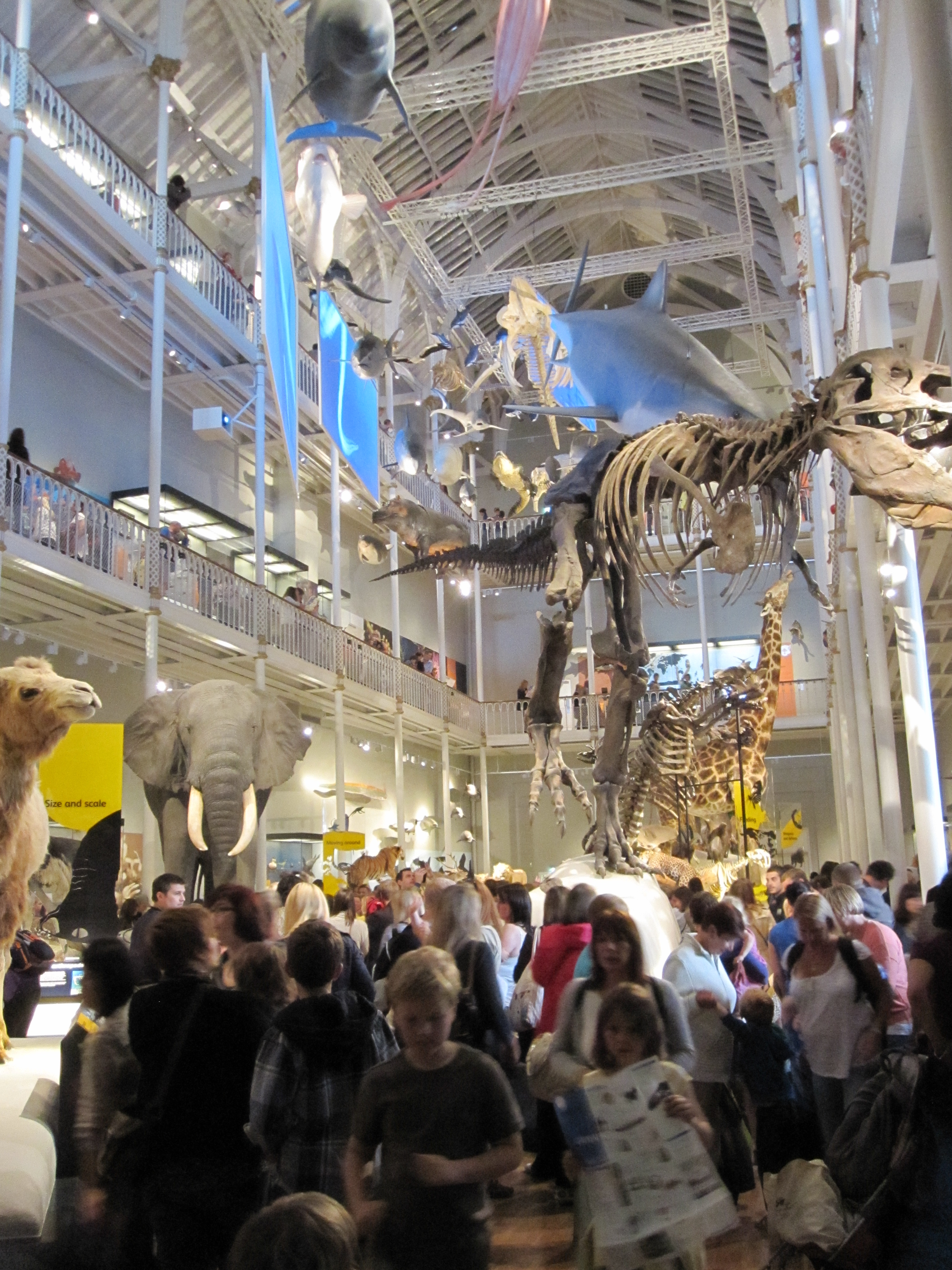
Natural Sciences department, the room opened in 1866 with natural history collections transferred from the adjacent University of Edinburgh.

The National Museum of Scotland (Scottish Gaelic: Taigh-tasgaidh Nàiseanta na h-Alba) in Edinburgh, Scotland, is a museum of Scottish history and culture.

It was formed in 2006 with the merger of the new Museum of Scotland, with collections relating to Scottish antiquities, culture and history, and the adjacent Royal Scottish Museum (opened in 1866 as the Edinburgh Museum of Science and Art, renamed in 1904, and for the period between 1985 and the merger named the Royal Museum of Scotland or simply the Royal Museum), with international collections covering science and technology, natural history, and world cultures. The two connected buildings stand beside each other on Chambers Street, by the junction with the George IV Bridge, in central Edinburgh. The museum is part of National Museums Scotland and admission is free.

The two buildings retain distinctive characters: the Museum of Scotland is housed in a modern building opened in 1998, while the former Royal Museum building was begun in 1861 and partially opened in 1866, with a Victorian Venetian Renaissance façade and a grand central hall of cast iron construction that rises the full height of the building, designed by Francis Fowke and Robert Matheson. This building underwent a major refurbishment and reopened on 29 July 2011 after a three-year, £47 million project to restore and extend the building led by Gareth Hoskins Architects along with the concurrent redesign of the exhibitions by Ralph Appelbaum Associates.

The National Museum incorporates the collections of the former National Museum of Antiquities of Scotland. As well as the national collections of Scottish archaeological finds and medieval objects, the museum contains artefacts from around the world, encompassing geology, archaeology, natural history, science, technology, art, and world cultures. The sixteen new galleries reopened in 2011 include 8,000 objects, 80% of which were not previously on display. One of the more notable exhibits is the stuffed body of Dolly the sheep, the first successful cloning of a mammal from an adult cell. Other highlights include Ancient Egyptian exhibitions, one of Sir Elton John's extravagant suits, the Jean Muir Collection of costume and a large kinetic sculpture named the Millennium Clock. A Scottish invention that is on display is the Scottish Maiden, an early beheading machine predating the French guillotine.

In 2025, the museum received 2,318,305 visitors, making it Scotland's most popular visitor attraction that year.

== History ==
=== Royal Museum of the University ===
In 1697 Robert Sibbald presented the University of Edinburgh College of Medicine with a natural history collection he had put together with his friend Andrew Balfour, who had recently died. The wide range of specimens was put on permanent display in the university, as one of the first museums in the UK. Daniel Defoe, in A Tour thro' the Whole Island of Great Britain published in 1737, called it "a fine Musæum, or Chamber of Rarities, which are worth seeing, and which, in some things, is not to be match'd in Europe". Later editions of the book said it had rarities not to be found in the Royal Society or the Ashmolean Museum. In 1767 the museum became the responsibility of the first Regius Professor of natural history, Robert Ramsey, then in 1779 his successor John Walker recorded that he had found the collection was in poor condition.

The Regius Professorship, and the museum, was taken over in 1804 by Robert Jameson, a mineralogist whose course covered zoology and geology, who built it up "not a private department of the university but as a public department connected in some degree with the country of Scotland". In 1812 it was renamed the "Royal Museum of the University". An enormous number of specimens were acquired, by buying from other collections and by encouraging travellers abroad to collect and preserve their finds. Packages were delivered duty-free, and half of the specimens collected by Royal Navy survey ships went to the museum (the other half going to the British Museum in London). Jameson's natural history course held practical classes three times a week in "the great museum he had collected for illustrating his teaching", including description of exhibits and identification of mineral specimens.

With support from the University Authorities, Edinburgh Town Council and the Commissioners for the College Buildings, a new museum was built in 1820 as part of new university buildings (the museum is now occupied by the Talbot Rice Gallery, its main features still in place). The taxidermist John Edmonstone undertook work for the museum, and in 1826 gave private lessons to Charles Darwin, who later studied in the museum and befriended its curator, the ornithologist William MacGillivray.

The collections, noted as "second only to those of the British Museum", overfilled the available space. In 1852 Jameson suggested proposals, which were put forward by the university Senatus, that the natural history collections be taken over by the government to form a new National Museum adjacent to the university, and integrated into it. Jameson was seriously ill during this time, and died on 19 April 1854, shortly after the negotiated agreement was formalised.

=== Chambers Street Museum ===
For a few years after the museum first opened, its frontage looked on to a narrow lane. In the 1870s this lane was widened in forming Chambers Street. Over the following century, though there were official names, it became popularly known as the "Chambers Street Museum".

==== Industrial Museum of Scotland ====
The site for building, bought earlier to ensure unobstructed light to the university buildings, had been occupied by two properties west of Jameson's museum; an Independent Chapel with seats for 1,000 fronting West College Street, and the Trades' Maiden Hospital girls' school beside Argyle Square. The grounds of these buildings were bounded on the north by a narrow lane connecting North College Street to the square, and on the south by the Flodden Wall.

Industrial Museum (Scotland) Act 1860 (Note: Section 1.)
- Act of Parliament
- Parliament of the United Kingdom
- Long title: An Act to confer Powers on the Commissioners of Her Majesty's Works and Public Buildings to acquire certain Property in Edinburgh, for the Erection of an Industrial Museum for Scotland.
- Citation: 23 & 24 Vict. c. 117
- Territorial extent: United Kingdom

Dates
- Royal assent: 28 August 1860
- Commencement: 28 August 1860 (Note: The Acts of Parliament (Commencement) Act 1793.)

Status: Current legislation

Text of statute as originally enacted

In 1854, the government chose to transfer the university's collection into an enlarged natural history museum combined with a new institution educating the public about commerce and industrial arts. It established the Industrial Museum of Scotland under the direction of the Board of Trade's Science and Art Department in London, and approved purchase of the site. The brief was to emulate The Museum of Practical Geology of "London, but embracing, in addition, the economic products of the animal and vegetable kingdoms". The general director of the museum would be responsible to the Board. The university's Regius Professor of natural history continued as Keeper of its collection, with access to specimens to illustrate lectures, and also reported directly to the Board. In 1855 George Wilson was appointed as the museum's first director, he pressed ahead with preparations while the Board of Works organised designs, but died in 1859. Thomas Croxen Archer was appointed director on 10 May 1860, and the Industrial Museum (Scotland) Act 1860 was passed on 28 August. Design work was carried out by Captain Francis Fowke, Engineer and Artist of the Science and Art Department, and architect Robert Matheson of the Office of Works in Edinburgh. Contract documents were signed in May 1861, and construction began. In ceremonies on 23 October 1861, Prince Albert laid the foundation stone of the General Post Office on Waterloo Place, then the foundation stone of the museum. This was his last public appearance before his death six weeks later.

==== Edinburgh Museum of Science and Art ====
The institution became the Edinburgh Museum of Science and Art in 1864, with two divisions; Natural History, and Industrial Arts. The natural history collection was transferred from the university in 1865–1866. Prince Alfred formally opened the first phase on 19 May 1866, with public access to the east wing and about a third of the Great Hall (now the Grand Gallery). A temporary wall formed the west gable of this space, displays in it included models and machinery of architecture, military and civil engineering, including lighthouses. A small hall (now Living Lands) accommodated manufactures. The natural history collection took up the large hall in the east wing (now Animal World), a corridor link to the university formed a "Bridge of Sighs" over West College Street. On the western half of the site, "old buildings" which had formed Argyll Square were in temporary use for agricultural and educational exhibits.

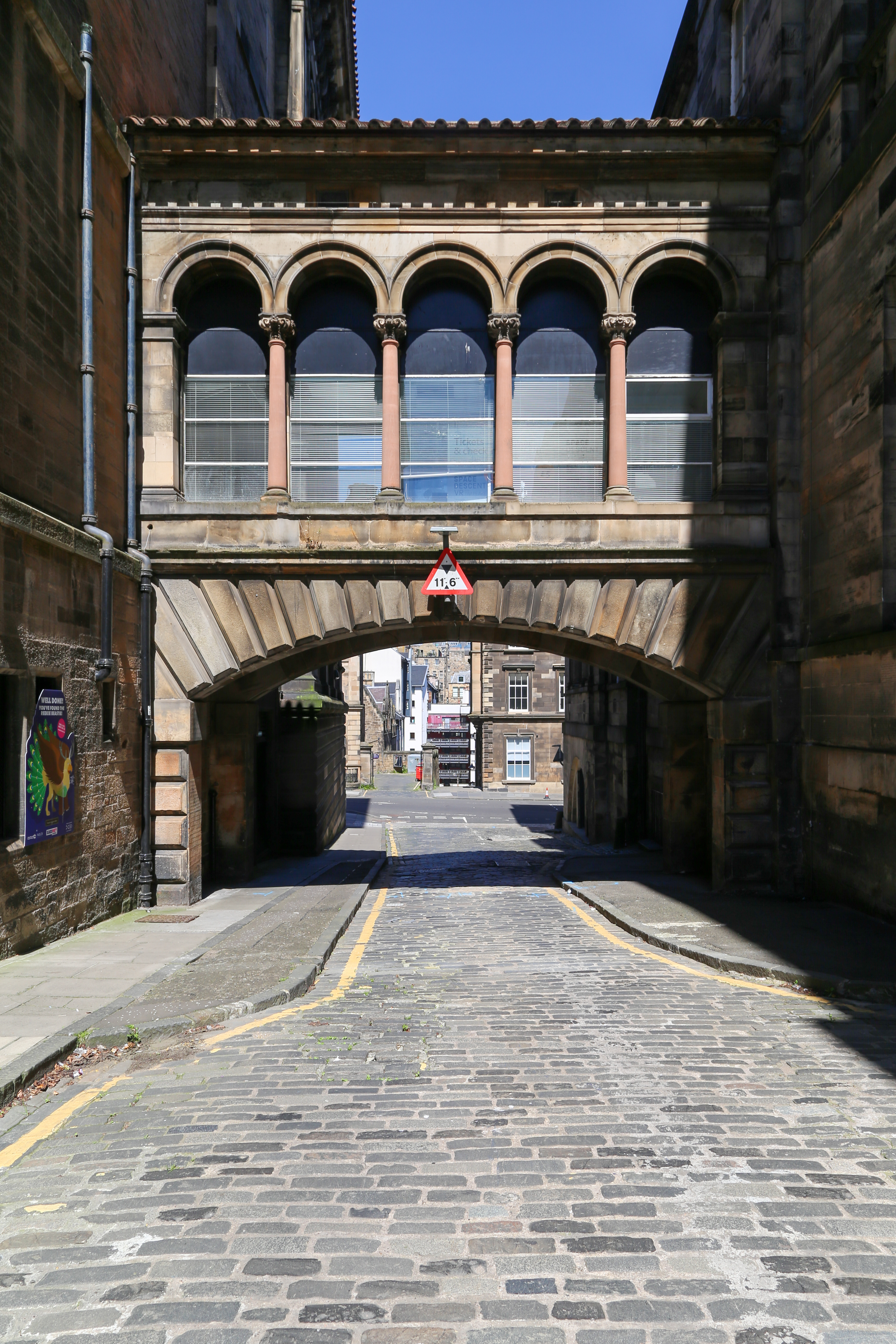
Corridor connecting the museum to the university

George Allman became Regius Professor and Keeper of the natural history collection in 1855. Issues developed over access to specimens for teaching, particularly when some were lost, and he apparently neglected curation. Wyville Thomson took over in 1870, and the Board of Trade redefined duties, but curation was not his priority. For a reception in the Spring of 1871, the museum stored refreshments in the "Bridge of Sighs" corridor, but students found this and no drinks were left for the Edinburgh worthies, so a door restricted access from the university. Wyville Thomson went on the Challenger expedition for four years. The museum severed ties with the university in 1873, and appointed Ramsay Traquair as its Keeper of the Natural History Collections. The bridge was closed (at some time later it was reopened and for a while prior to the museum's temporary closure during World War II it provided limited access between the museum and University). The university had lost use of the museum specimens, so started a replacement teaching collection in its old museum space. This became intolerably cramped, eventually James Hartley Ashworth raised funds and a new teaching laboratory and museum was opened in 1929 at the King's Buildings campus.

In 1871 work began on widening the street to the north of the university and museum to form Chambers Street, linked to George IV Bridge. The central section of the Museum of Science and Art building, including the rest of the Great Hall, was completed in 1874 and formally opened to the public on 14 January 1875. The west wing was completed in 1888, rooms were opened to the public when they were fitted out, until the last one opened on 14 October 1890.

==== Royal Scottish Museum ====
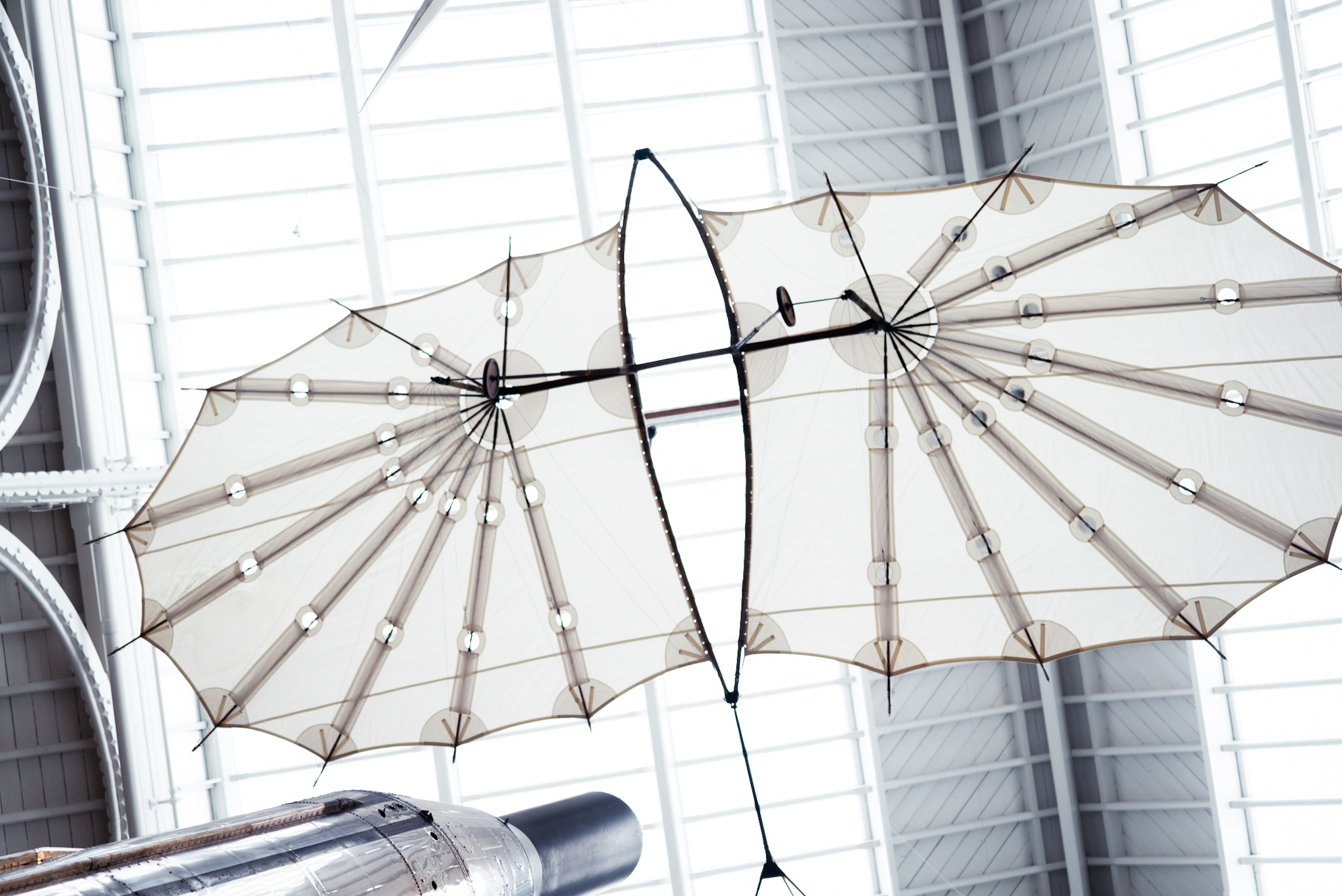
Percy Pilcher's Hawk glider, restored after his fatal crash of 1899, and on display in the Royal Scottish Museum from 1909.

Administration of the museum was transferred in 1901 from the Science and Art Department to the Scottish Education Department, and in 1904 the institution was renamed the Royal Scottish Museum.

Electricity was introduced, replacing the original gas lighting, and powering the first interactive displays in the museum: push-button working models, starting with a marine steam engine and a sectioned steam locomotive. During the period 1871-1911 much of the day-to-day running of the museum was undertaken not by the director, but by the curator.

The Royal Scottish Museum has displayed practical joke exhibits on April Fool's Day on at least one occasion. In 1975, a fictitious bird called the Bare-fronted Hoodwink (known for its innate ability to fly away from observers before they could accurately identify it) was put on display. The exhibit included blurred photographs of birds flying away. To make the exhibit more convincing, a mount of the pretend bird was sewn together by a taxidermist from various scraps of real birds, including the head of a carrion crow, the body of a plover, and the feet of an unknown waterfowl. The bare front was composed of wax.

==== Royal Museum of Scotland ====
In 1985 the museum was renamed the Royal Museum of Scotland, and its administration came under the newly formed National Museums Scotland, along with the Museum of Antiquities which in 1998 moved to a new building constructed as an extension to the Royal Museum at the west end of Chambers Street.

=== National Museum of Antiquities of Scotland ===
The Society of Antiquaries of Scotland was founded in 1780. It still continues, but in 1858 its collection of archaeological and other finds was transferred to the government as the National Museum of Antiquities of Scotland, and from 1891 it occupied half of a new building in Queen Street in the New Town, with its entrance hall shared with the Scottish National Portrait Gallery which occupied the other half.

==== Museum of Scotland ====
The organisational merger of the National Museum of Antiquities of Scotland and the Royal Scottish Museum took place in 1985, but the two collections retained separate buildings until 1995 when the Queen Street building closed, to reopen later occupied solely by the Scottish National Portrait Gallery. In 1998 the new Museum of Scotland building opened, adjacent to the Royal Museum of Scotland building, and connected to it. The masterplan to redevelop the Victorian building and further integrate the architecture and collections was launched in 2004. The split naming caused confusion to visitors, and in 2006 permission was granted to remove "Royal" to achieve a unified brand.

=== Merger – present day ===
On 2006 the two museums were formally merged as the National Museum of Scotland. The naming had been changed for practical reasons, including strategy and marketing. The old Chambers Street Museum building closed for redevelopment in 2008, before reopening in July 2011.

Staff at the museum took several days of strike action at points during 2015 and 2016, called by the Public and Commercial Services Union.

In August 2023, the museum began preparing for the return of the Ni'isjoohl totem pole to the Nisga'a people of British Columbia, Canada. The 36 feet (11 m) pole was carved in 1855, and arrived in Scotland in 1929 after being stolen from the Nisga'a. It was sold to the museum by Canadian anthropologist Marius Barbeau.

== Architecture ==
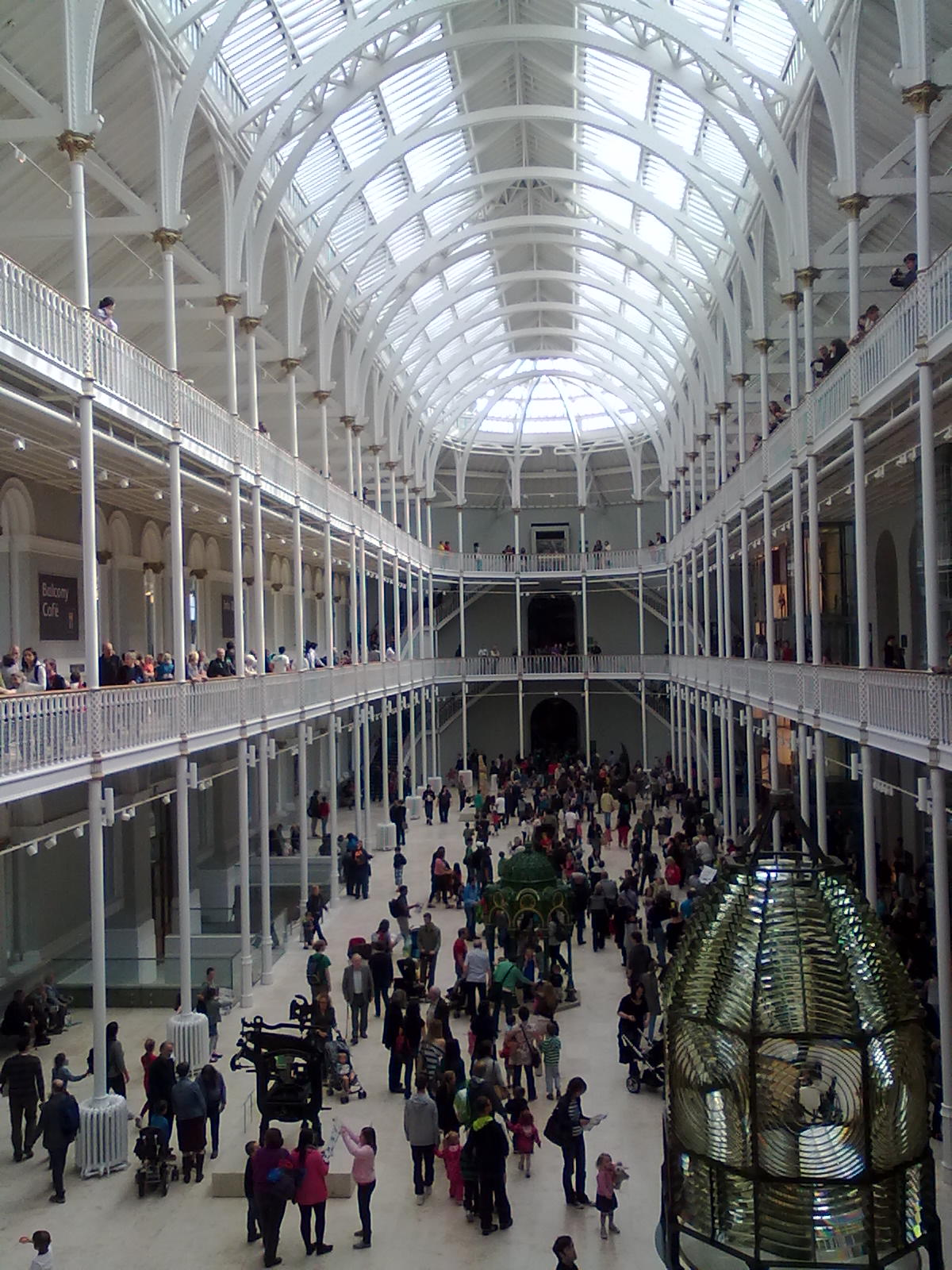
The Grand Gallery of the former Chambers Street Museum building on reopening day, 29 July 2011

=== Royal Scottish Museum building ===
Construction was started in 1861 and proceeded in phases, the eastern sections opened in 1866 before others had even begun construction. The full extent of the original design was completed in 1888. It was designed by civil engineer Captain Francis Fowke of the Royal Engineers, Engineer and Artist of the Science and Art Department in London who was also responsible for the Royal Albert Hall, and architect Robert Matheson of the Office of Works in Edinburgh. The exterior, designed in a Venetian Renaissance style, contrasts sharply with the light-flooded main hall or Grand Gallery, inspired by The Crystal Palace.

Numerous extensions at the rear of the building, particularly in the 1930s, extended the museum greatly. 1998 saw the opening of the Museum of Scotland (now the Scottish History and Archaeology department), linked internally to the main building. The major redevelopment completed in 2011 by Gareth Hoskins Architects uses former storage areas to form a vaulted Entrance Hall of 1,400 m^{2} (15,000 sq ft) at street level with visitor facilities. This involved lowering the floor level by 1.2 metres (4 ft). Despite being a Class A listed building, it was possible to add lifts and escalators. The accessible entrance is at the corner tower of the Scottish History and Archaeology building.

=== Museum of Scotland (Scottish History and Archaeology) building ===
The building is designed by Benson & Forsyth. Made up of geometric, Corbusian forms, it has numerous references to Scotland, such as brochs and castellated defensive architecture. It is clad in golden Moray sandstone, which one of its architects, Gordon Benson, has called "the oldest exhibit in the building", a reference to Scottish geology. There is a roof garden with Scottish species and panoramic views of the city. The building was a 1999 Stirling Prize nominee.

== Collections ==
The galleries in the newer building present Scottish history in an essentially chronological arrangement, beginning at the lowest level with prehistory to the early medieval period, with later periods on the higher levels. The Victorian building, as reopened in 2011, contains four zones (each with numerous galleries), covering natural history, world cultures (including galleries on the South Pacific, East Asia, and Ancient Egypt), European art and design, and science & technology. The Grand Gallery contains a variety of large objects from the collections, with a display called the "Window on the World" rising through four storeys, or about 20 metres (66 ft), containing over 800 objects reflecting the breadth of the collections. Beyond the Grand Gallery at ground level is the "Discoveries" gallery, with objects connected to "remarkable Scots ... in the fields of invention, exploration and adventure". Notable artifacts include:

- Assyrian relief of King Ashurnasirpal II and a court official
- Monymusk Reliquary
- St Ninian's Isle Treasure
- 11 of the Lewis chessmen. (The rest are owned by the British Museum)
- Celtic brooches, including the Hunterston Brooch
- Torrs Pony-cap and Horns
- Pictish stones, such as the Hilton of Cadboll Stone, Woodwrae Stone, and Monifieth Sculptured Stones
- The Cramond Lioness, Newstead Helmet and other items from the Roman frontier
- The Lunnasting stone
- Whitecleuch Chain
- Migdale Hoard
- Bute mazer
- Sculptures by Sir Eduardo Paolozzi, housing prehistoric jewellery
- A Union Flag and Scottish Flag raised by the Hanoverians and Jacobites respectively at the Battle of Culloden
- The Maiden, an early form of guillotine
- Prince Charlie's Targe and backsword
- The stuffed remains of Dolly the sheep
- Paintings by Margaret MacDonald
- Sculptures by Andy Goldsworthy, inspired by the work of Scottish geologist James Hutton
- Ballachulish figure
- The Galloway Hoard
- The Darien chest, used to store money and documents as part of the Darien scheme
- A silver girdle gifted to tenant farmer Margaret Hardie by the Earl of Lauderdale.
- 16th century BC Egyptian coffin and mummy known as the Qurna Queen.
- Edinburgh coffins

== Gallery ==
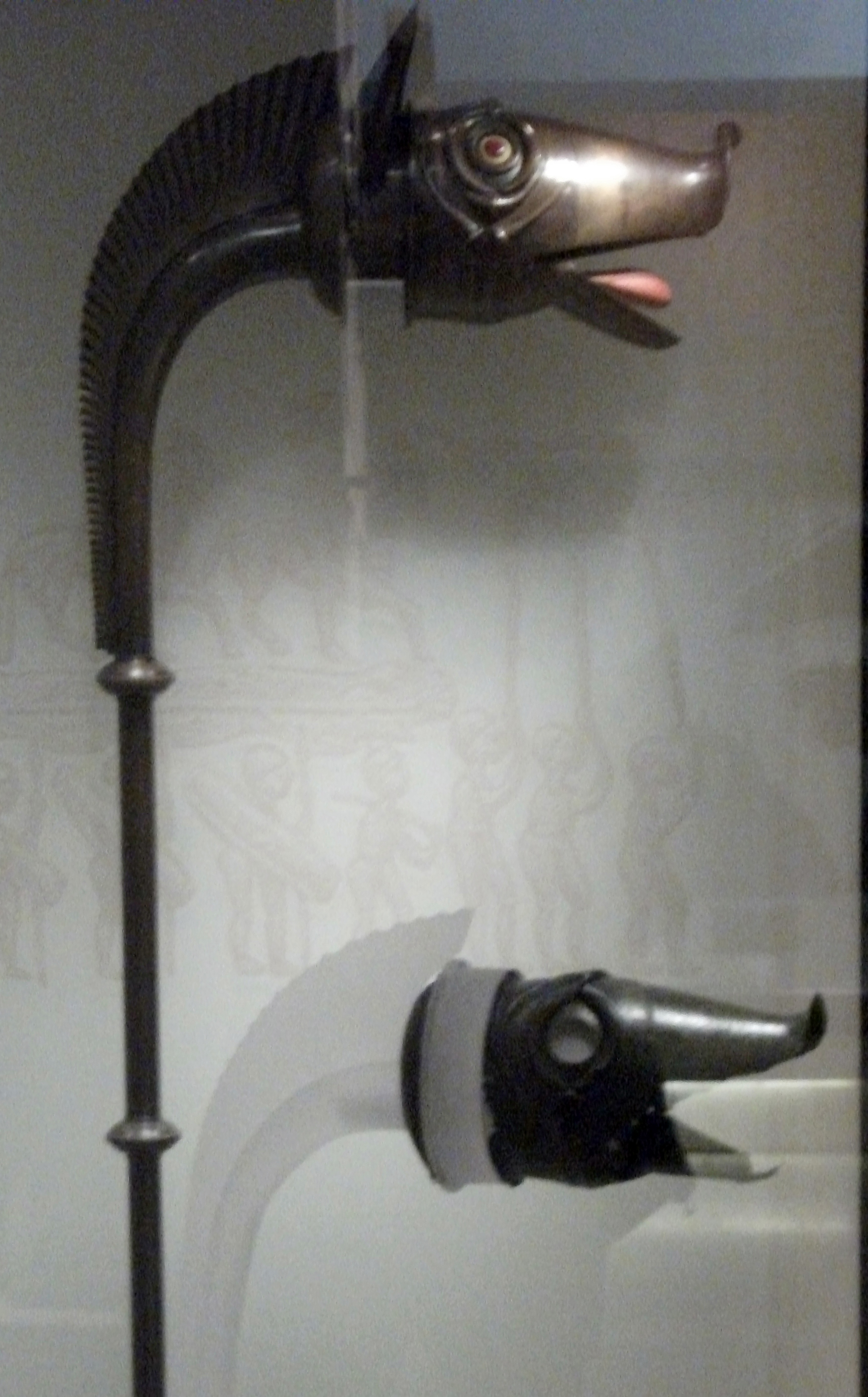
Deskford carnyx & modern reconstruction, c. 80–200 AD

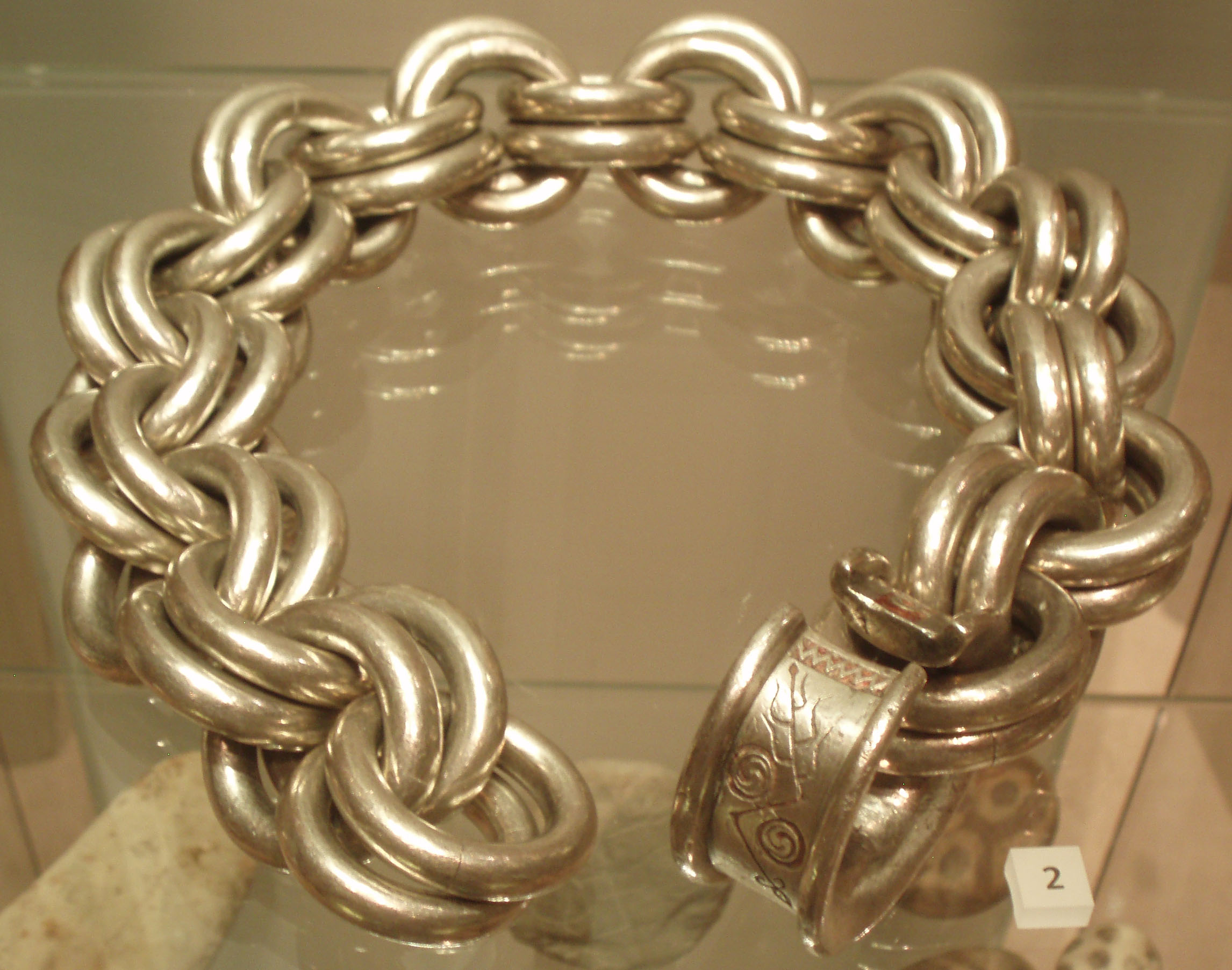
The Whitecleuch Chain; a penannular ring with Pictish symbols, dated to 400–800 AD

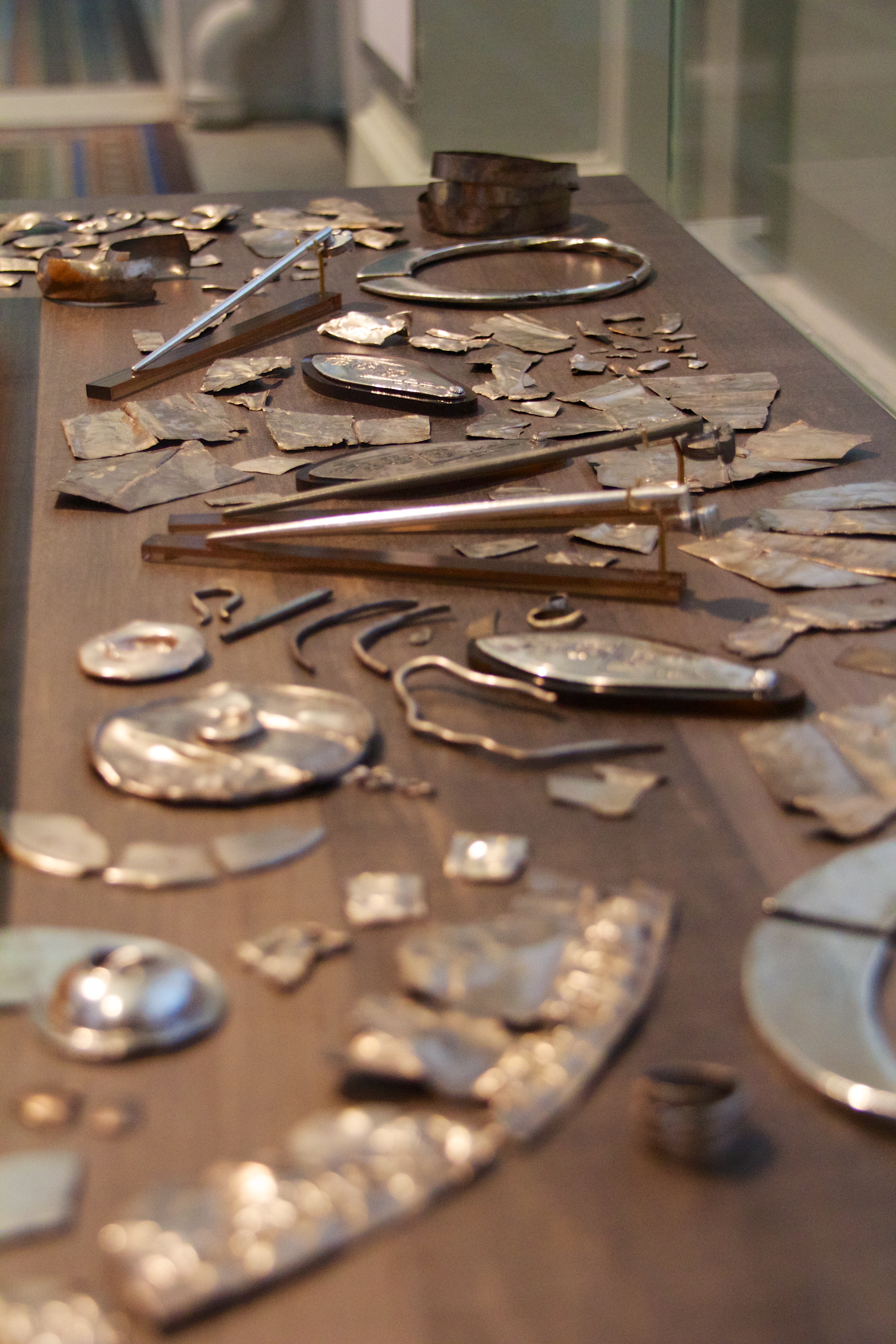
Hacksilver artifacts from Norrie's Law hoard, 6th century

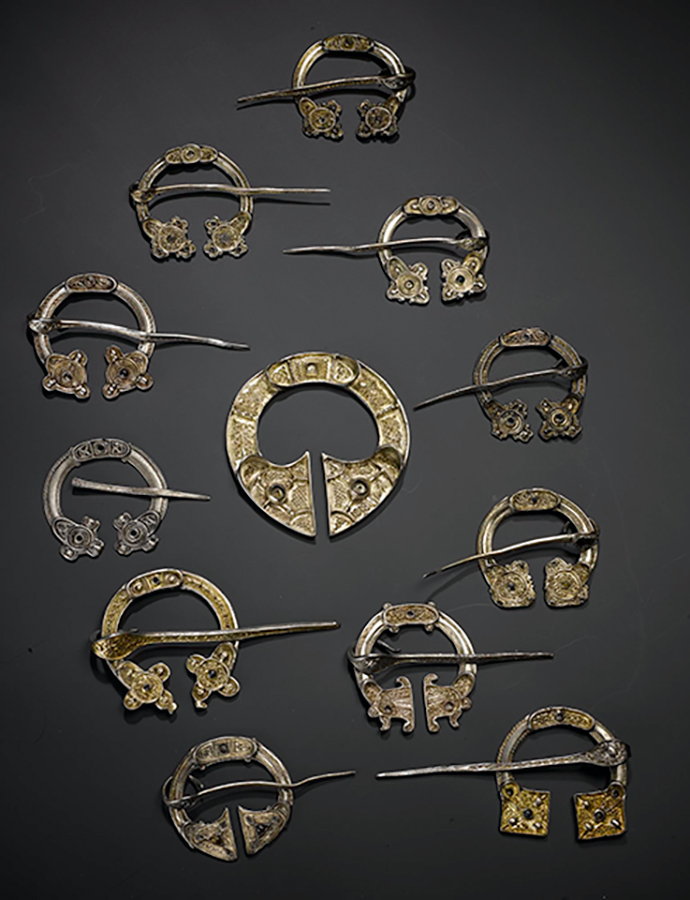
Brooches from St Ninian's Isle Treasure, Pictish horde, mid-8th century

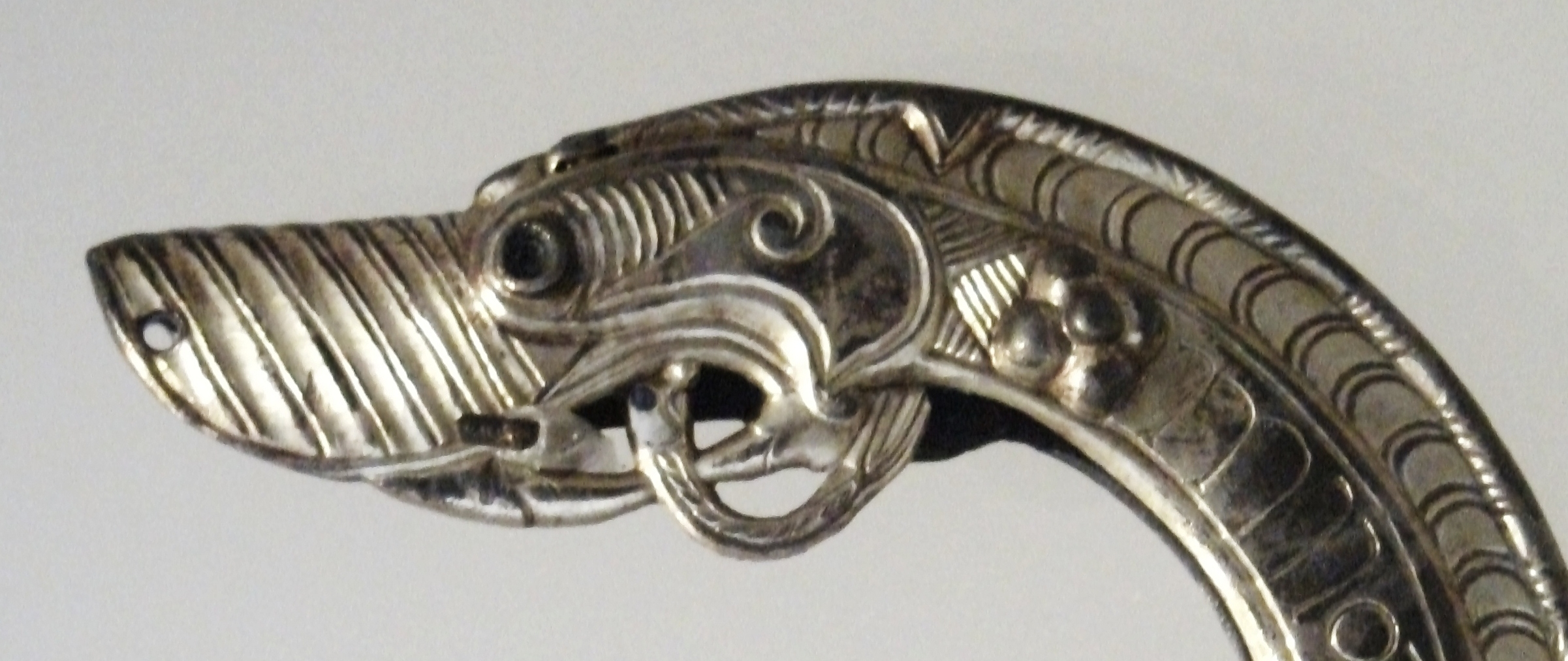
Chape from the St Ninian's Isle Treasure, c. 750–825 AD

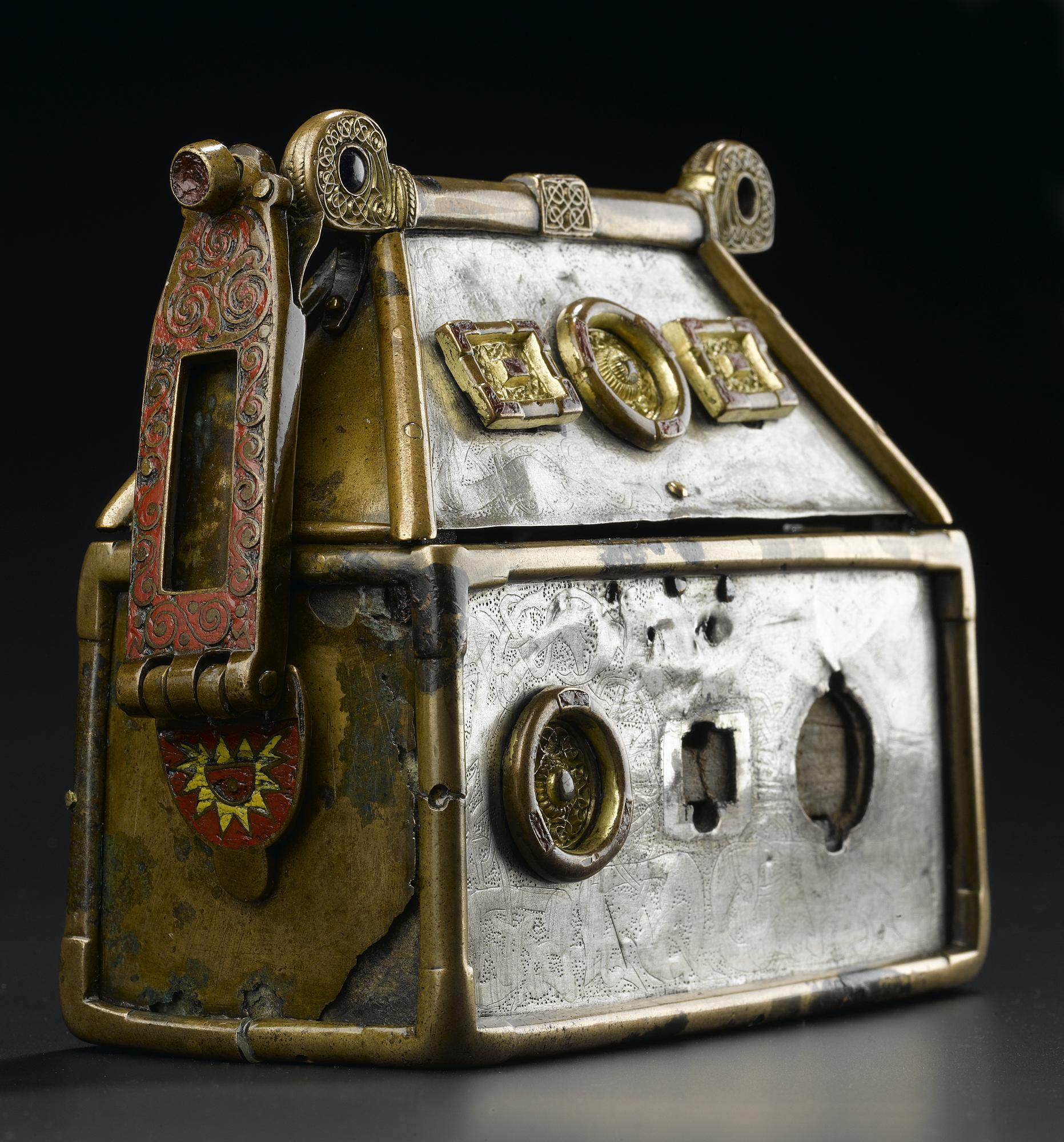
The Monymusk Reliquary, 8th century

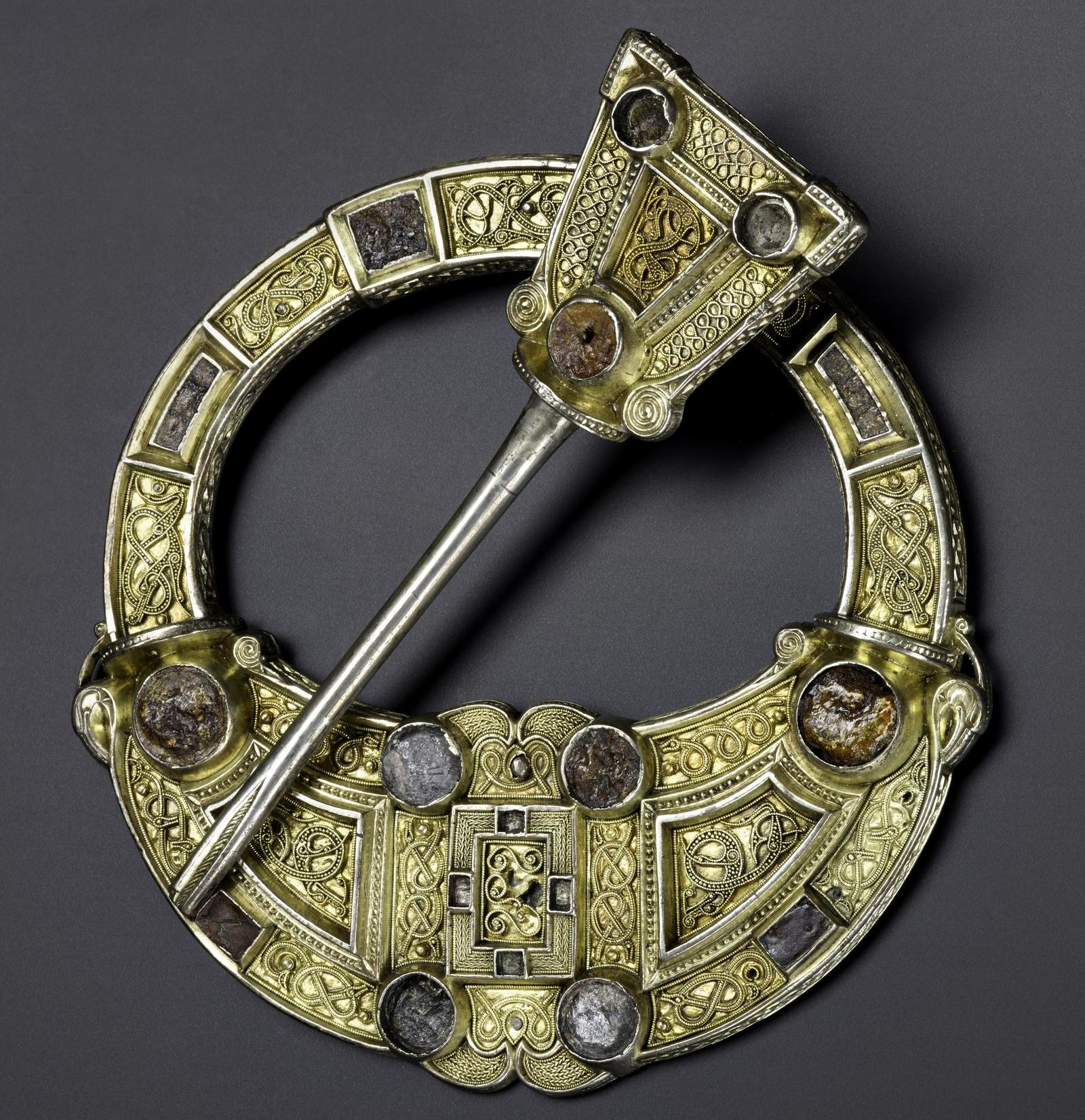
The Hunterston Brooch, c. 700 AD

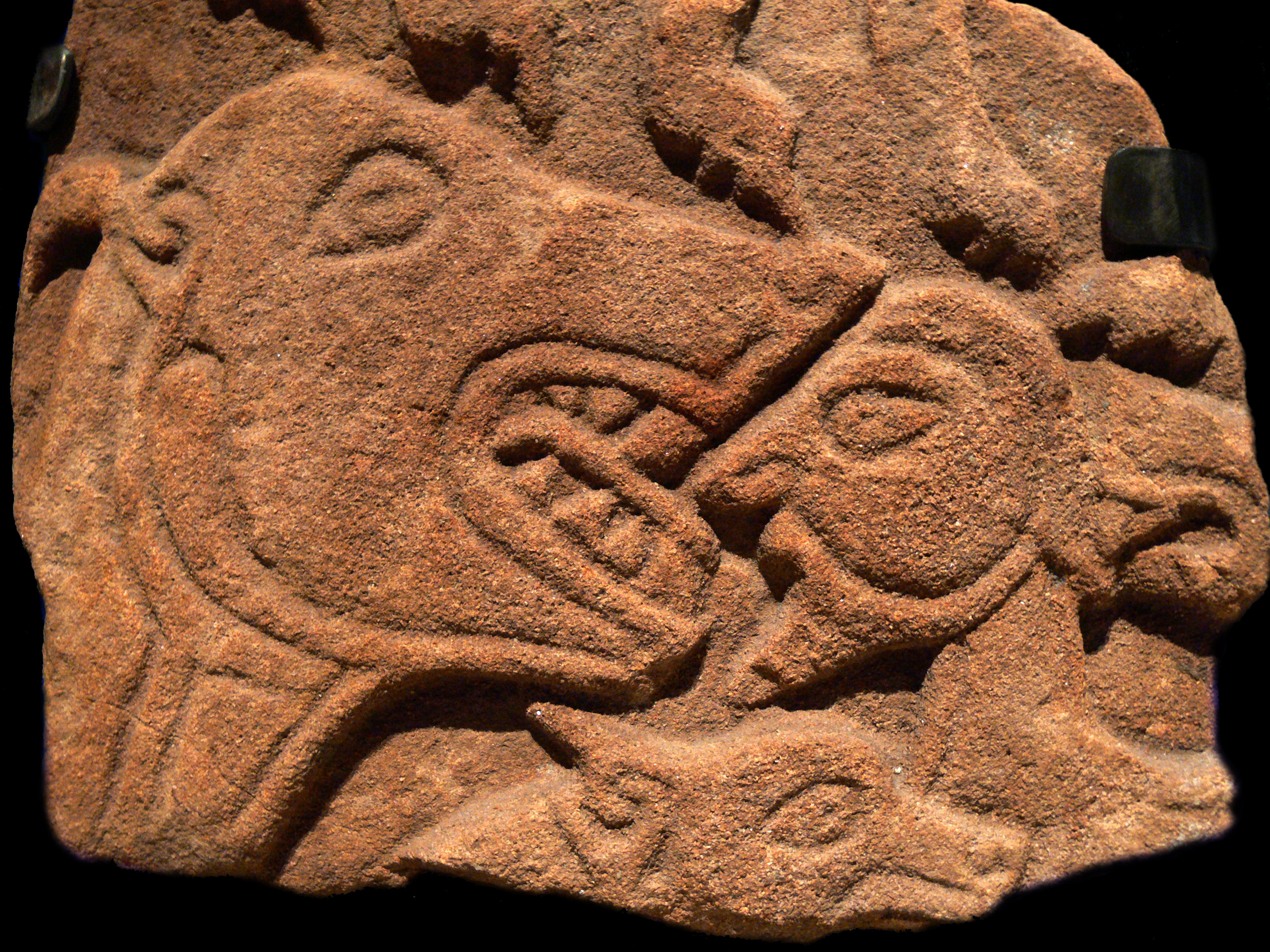
Daniel Stone (fragment), 7th century?

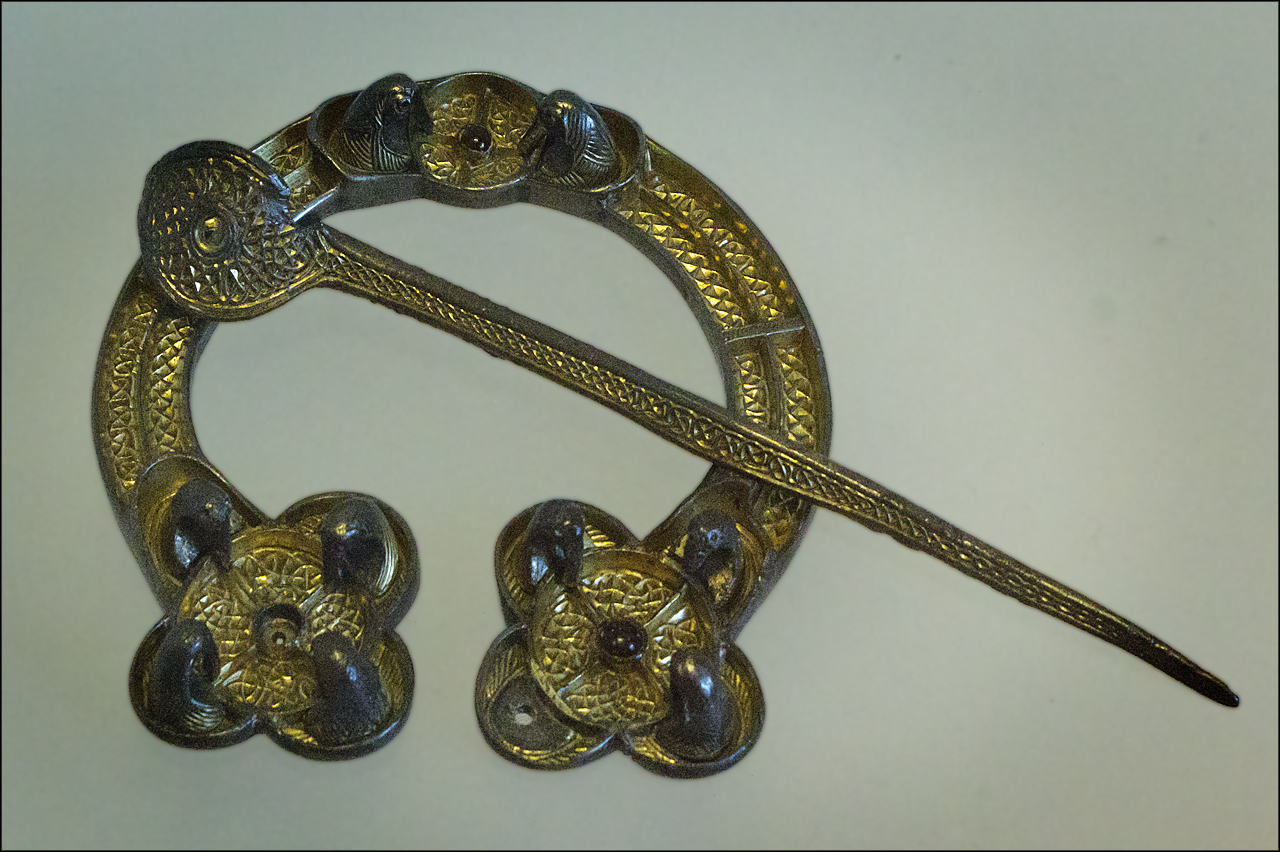
The Rogart Brooch, 8th century

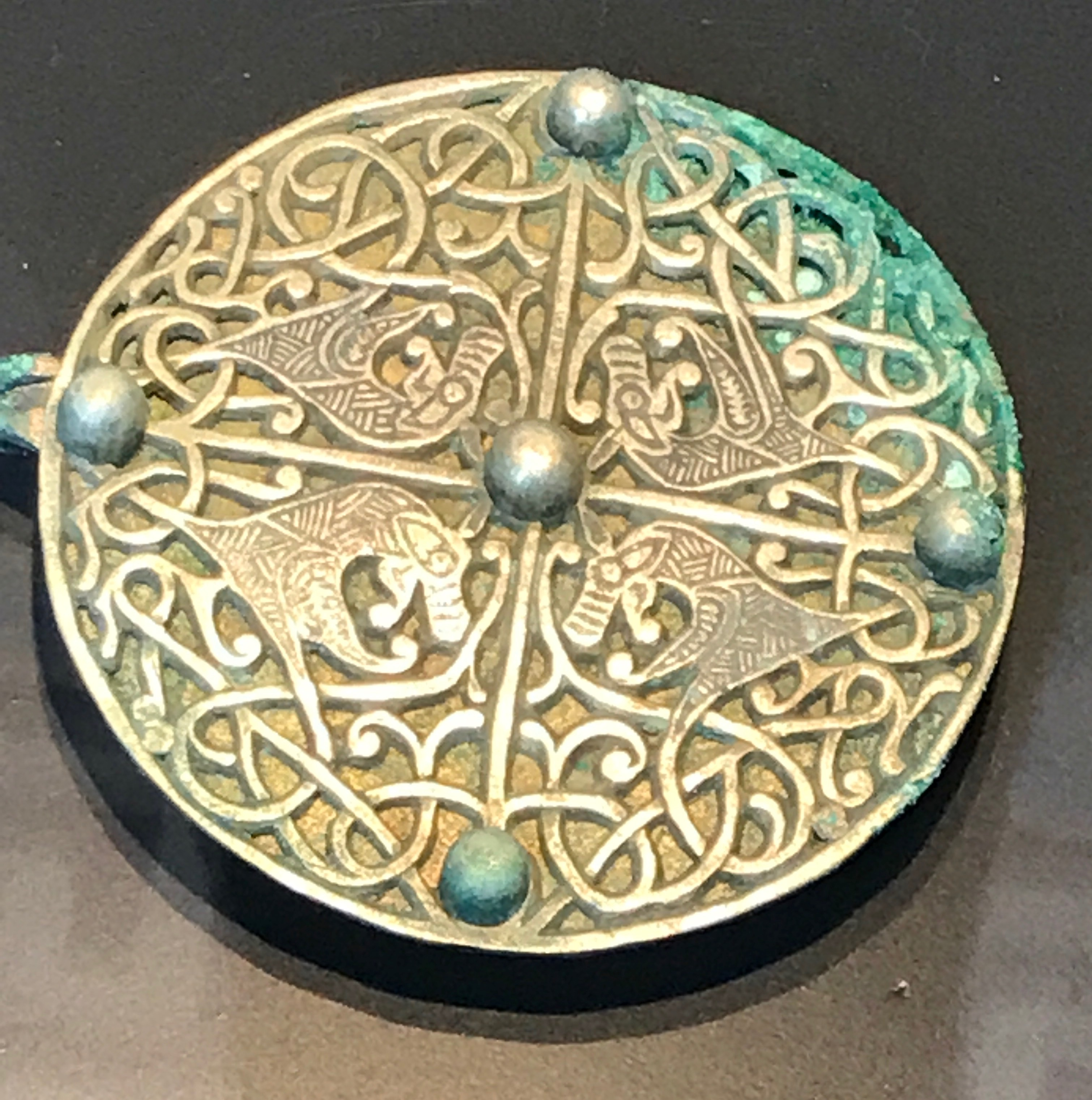
Brooch from the Galloway Hoard, 9th century

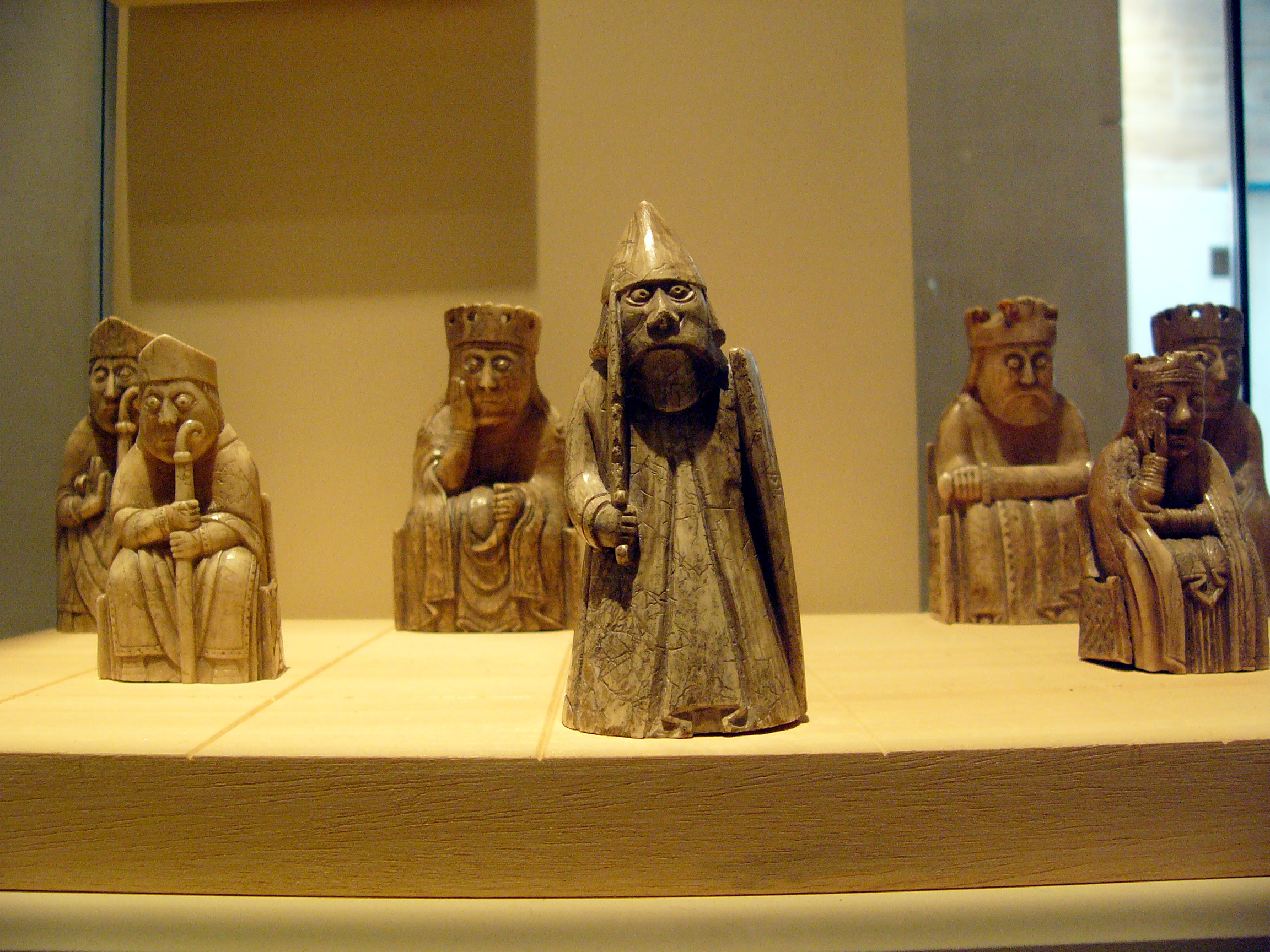
Some of the 11 Lewis chessmen, 12th century

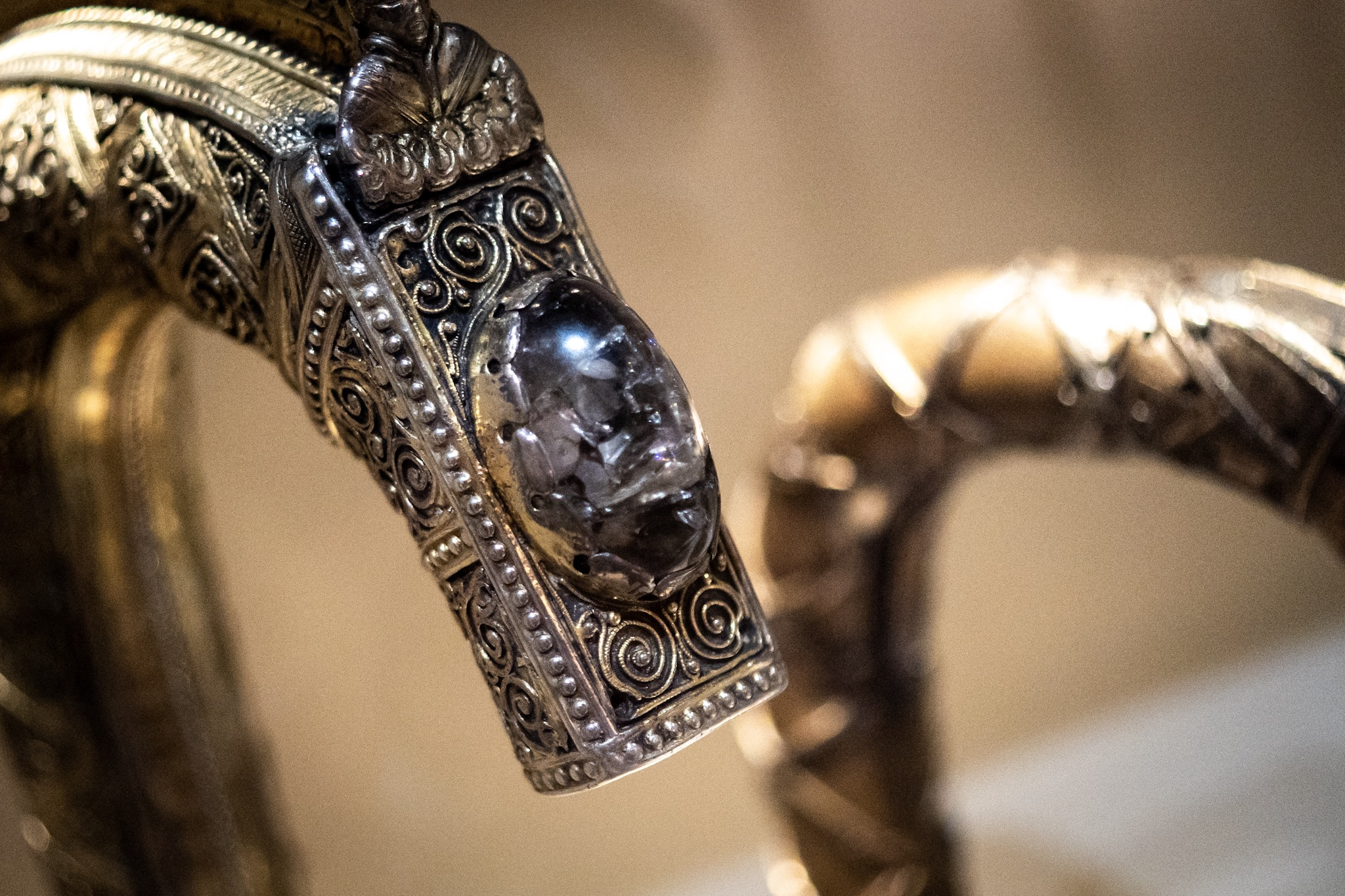
St Fillan’s Crozier and The Coigreach, (both:) 11th and 15th centuries

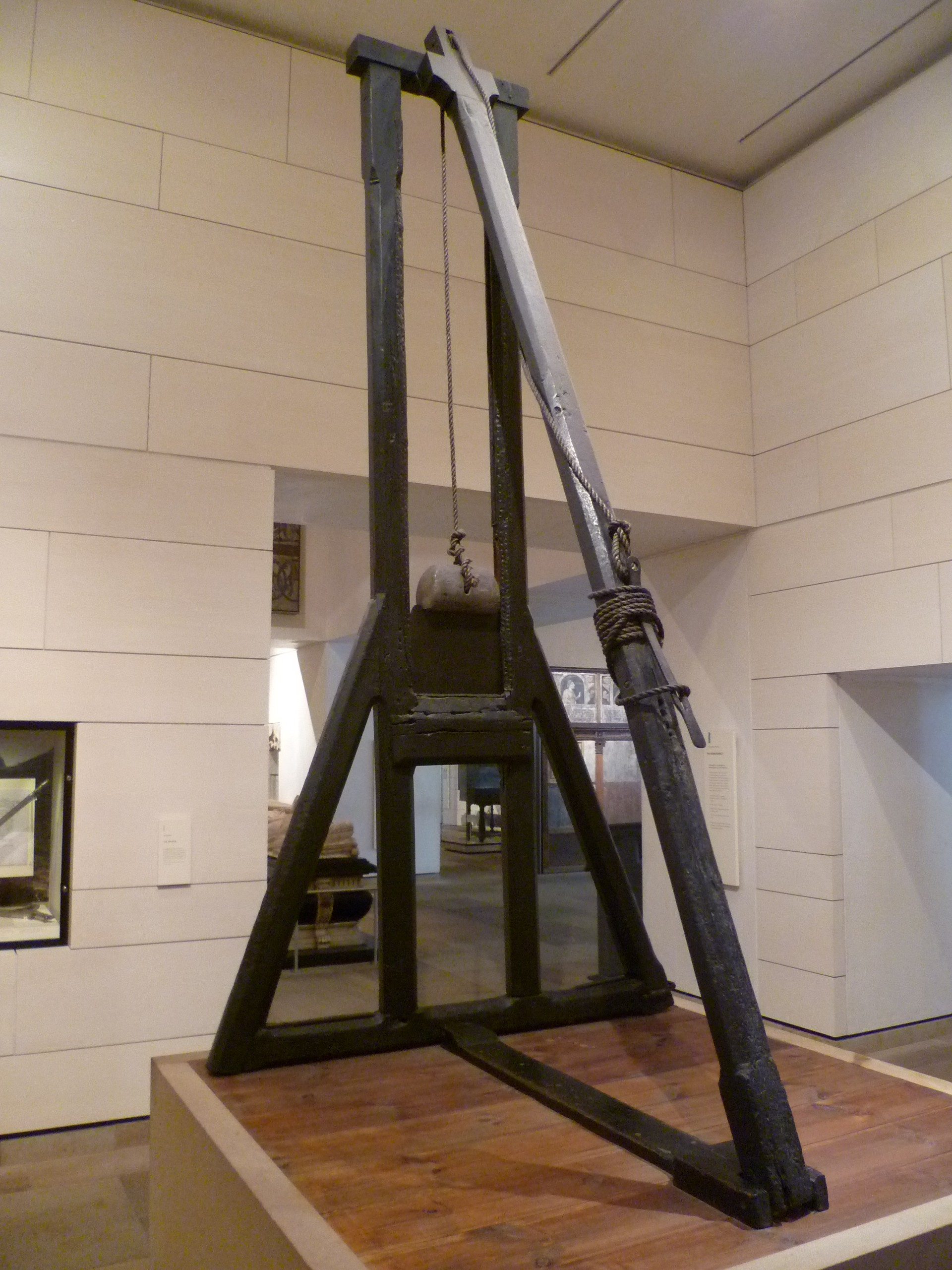
'The Maiden' 17th and 18th centuries

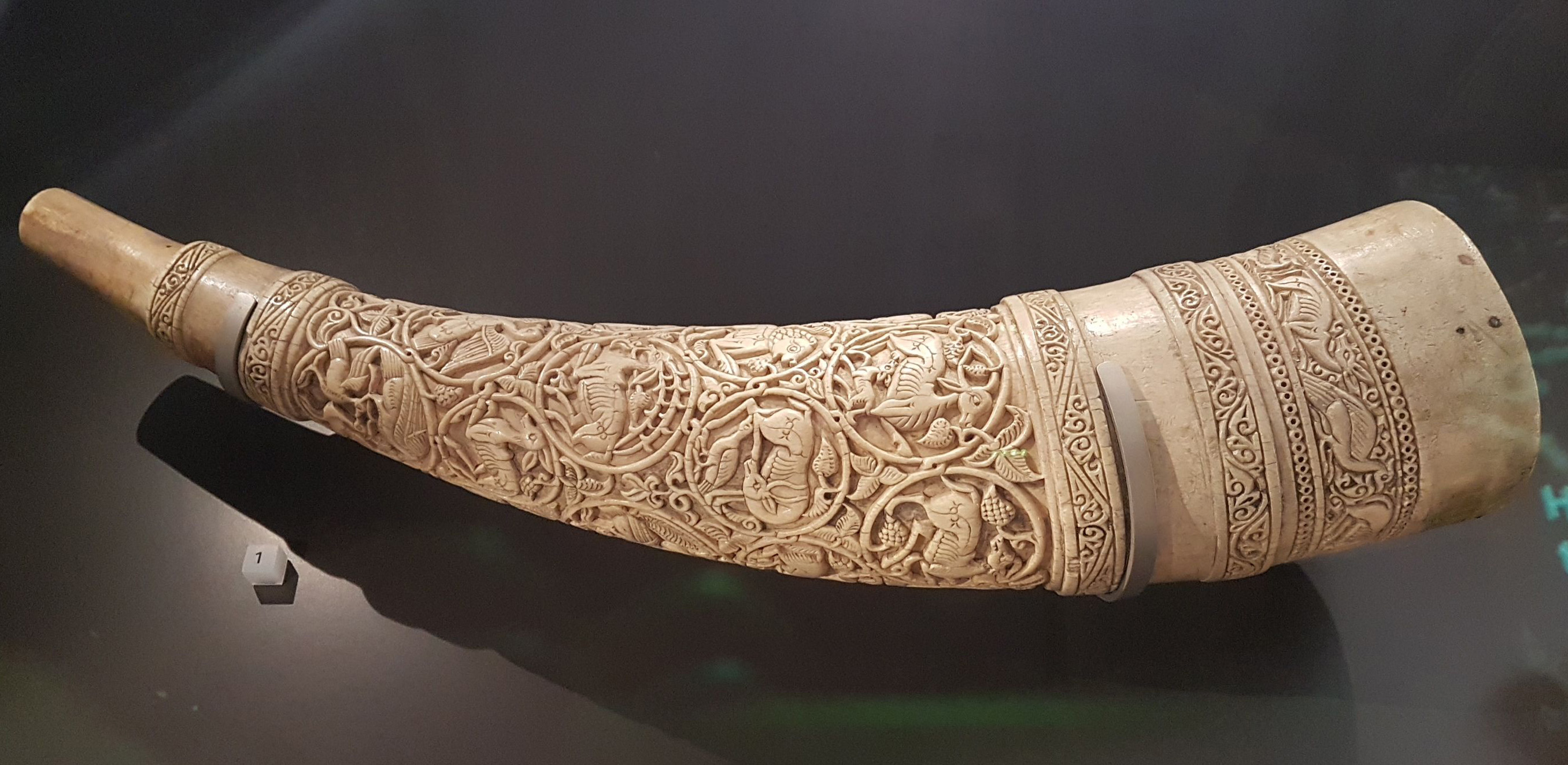
Carved elephant tusk (11th/12th c.) from Sicily or Southern Italy

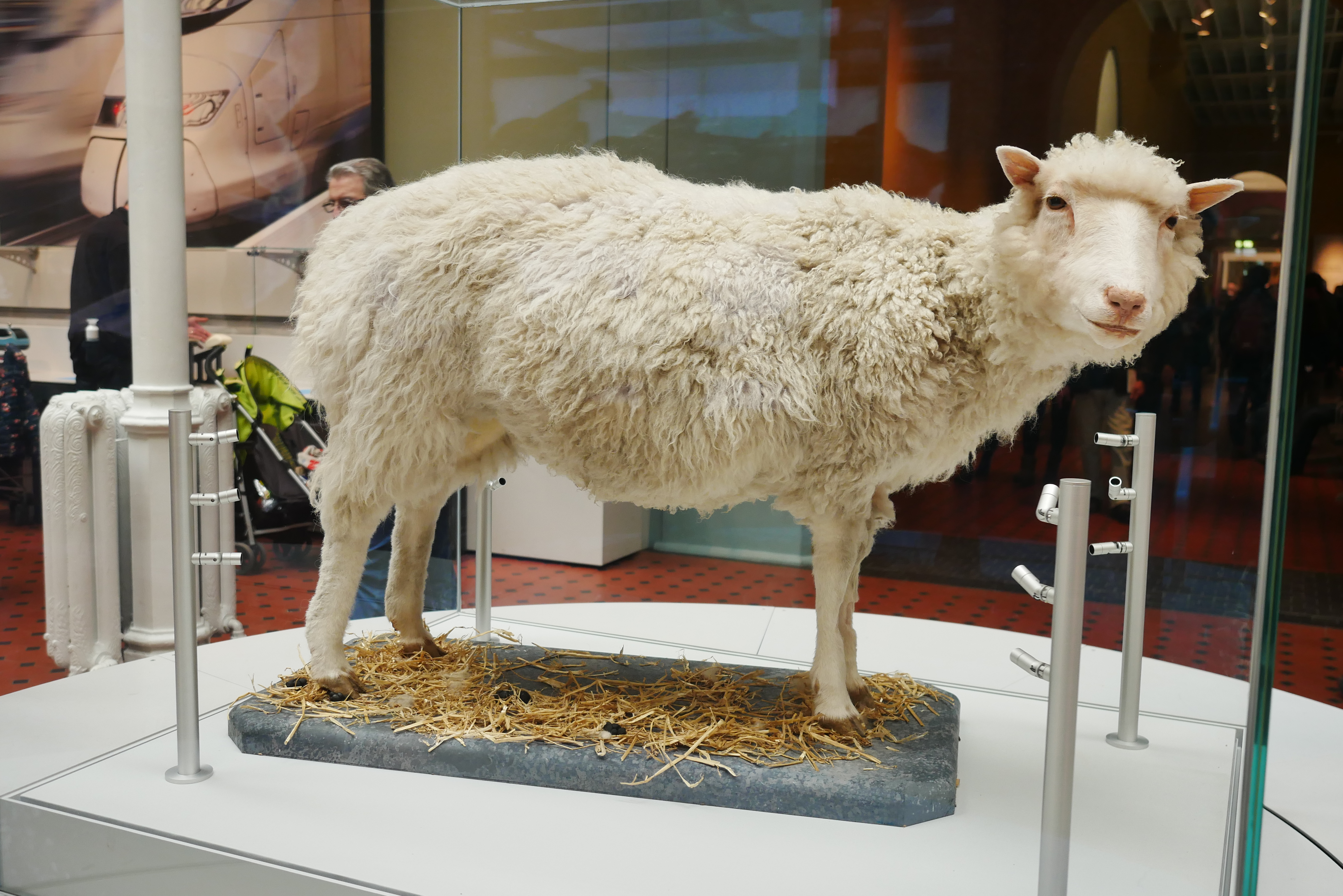
Taxidermy of Dolly the sheep

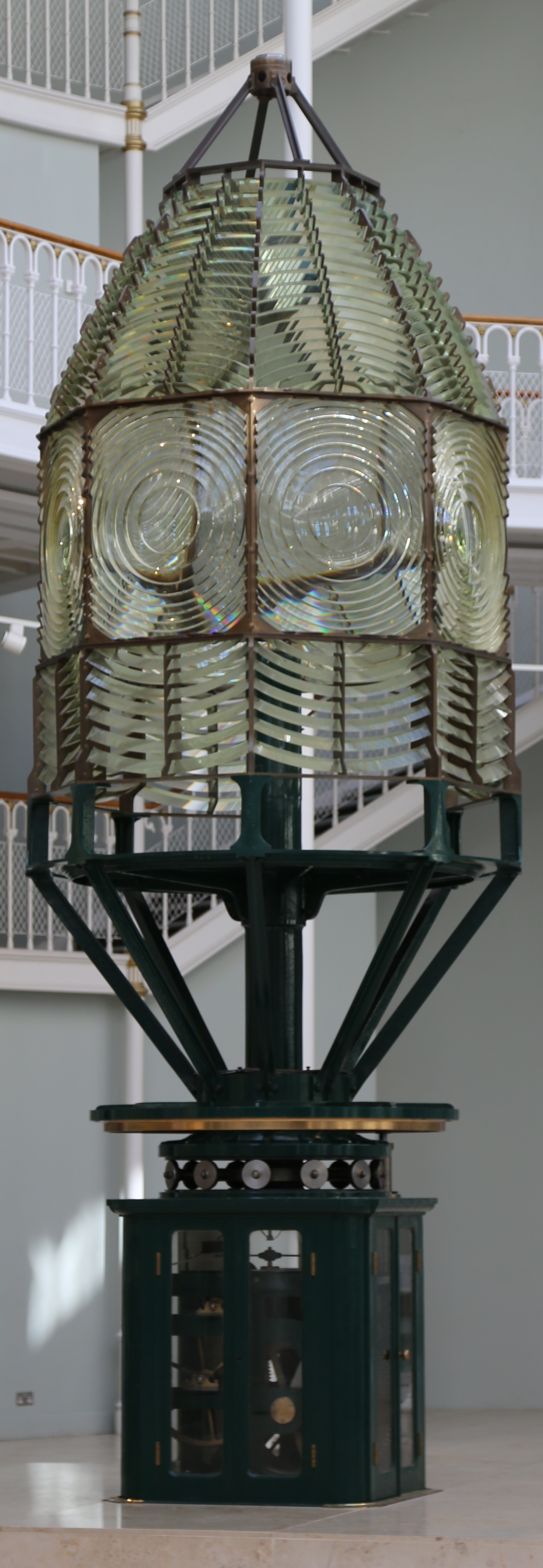
Inchkeith lighthouse lens and drive mechanism

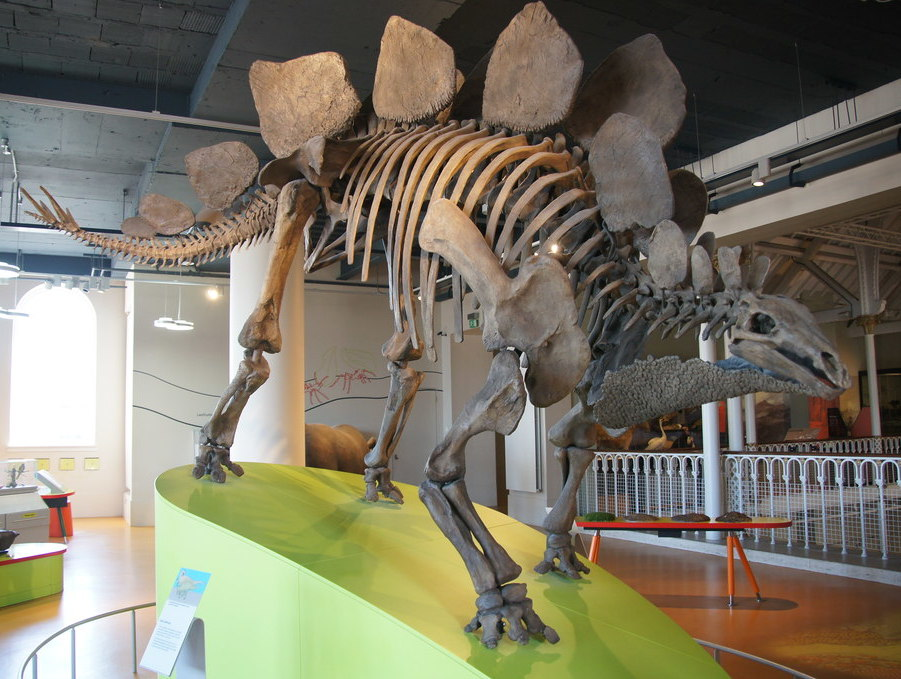
Stegosaurus skeleton
