= Papil Stone =

Papil

The Papil Stone is an 8th century carved Pictish cross-slab from a religious site in Papil, West Burra, Shetland. The remains of a church, burials and other Pictish stones have also been found at Papil which suggest it may once have been a monastic site. The Papil stone was discovered in 1887 in the grounds of St Laurence's Church, Papil, by the antiquarian and amateur archaeologist Gilbert Goudie, and is now on display at the National Museum of Scotland in Edinburgh.

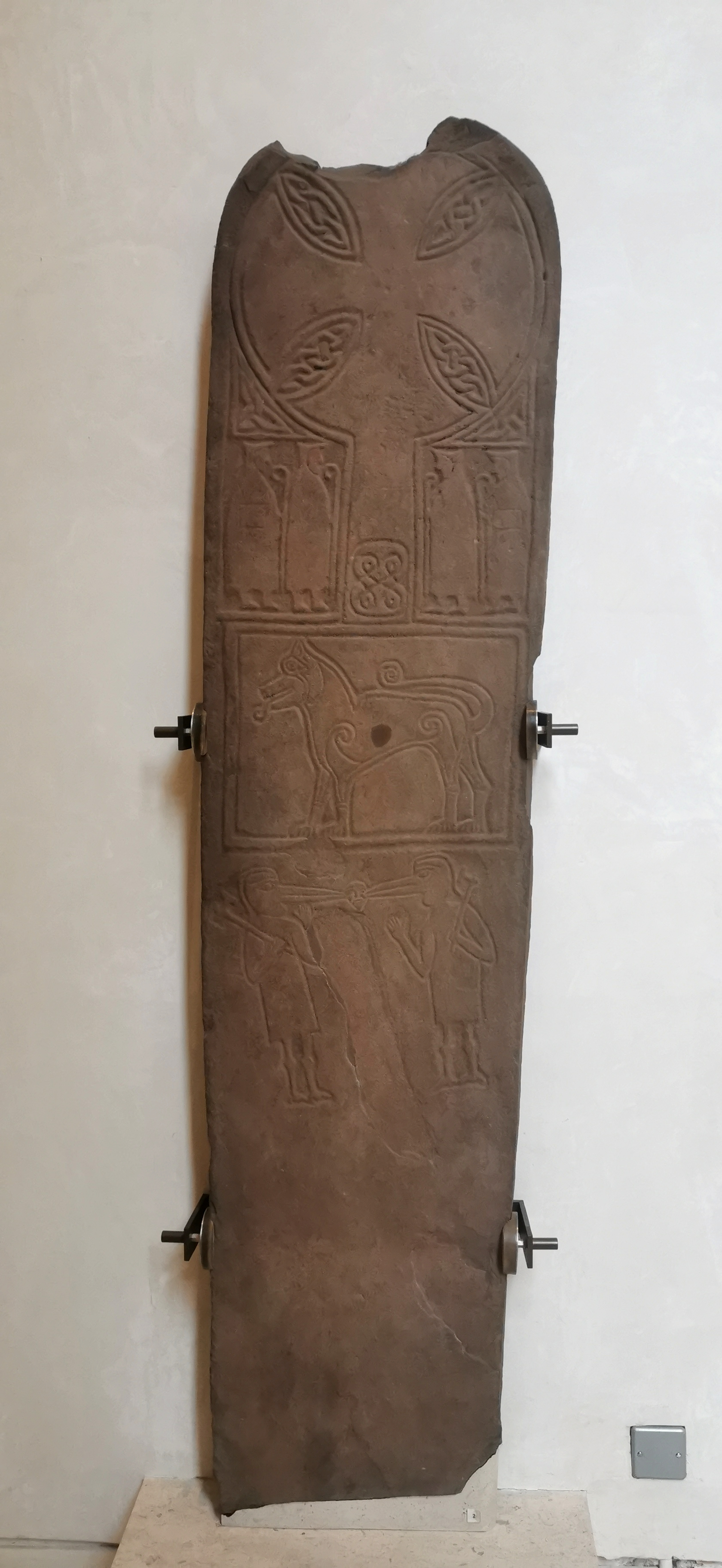
The Papil Stone in the National Museum of Scotland.

== Description ==
=== Cross and figures ===
The Papil stone is carved only on one face, leaving the reverse plain. At the top of the stone is a large long-stemmed cross shaped like a fan. At the foot of the cross are two pairs of human figures identified as clerics by their cowled robes, croziers and by the book satchels or shrines they carry.

Similar figures can be found on another Pictish stone from Papil known as the Papil shrine, which may have once functioned as a reliquary. This stone depicts five robed figures who are thought to be pilgrims. They carry croziers and book satchels and proceed on foot and horseback towards a cross on the left of the stone.

=== Quadruped ===
A large quadruped is positioned underneath the clerics and cross. Isabel and George Henderson approached the cross-slab within a vertical framework in which the top of the cross-slab is closest to Heaven and the base closest to Hell. With this in mind, they suggested that the central quadruped might represent Cerberus guarding the gates to Hell.

Carola Hicks noted similarities between the Papil quadruped and the animal evangelist symbols in the Book of Durrow. The Papil creature is stylistically similar to the lobate scrolls and spirals of St Luke's calf and is anatomically comparable to the lion of St Mark, sharing protruding tongues, almond-shaped eyes and raised curly tails.

=== Bird-headed hybrids and human head ===
Towards the base of the cross are two unusual humanoid figures wielding axes and flanking a small disembodied human head. The figures have thin legs with prominent knees, possibly clawed feet and most noticeably large bird-like beaks. These are usually identified as bird-headed hybrids and animal hybrids of various kinds occur frequently throughout Pictish art.

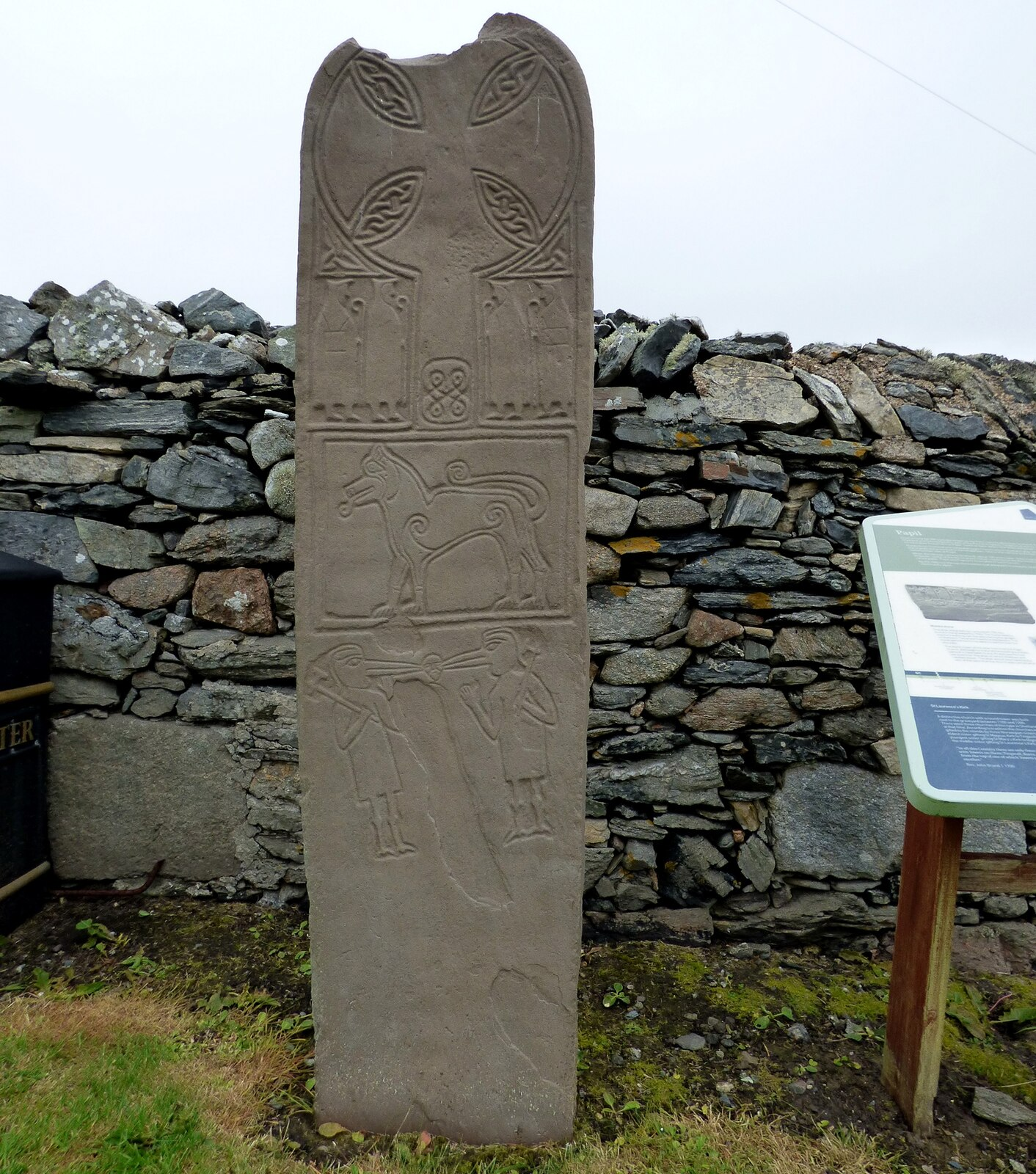
An image of the replica of the Papil Stone erected in its original location.

This section of the cross-slab is inscribed in a much different manner from the rest of the monument and is not aligned with the rest of the composition. For this reason, it has been suggested that it may have been a later addition to the stone. It is also unusual that these figures are featured on the obverse of the cross-slab rather than on the reverse which is the conventional placement for hybrid creatures and secular creatures on Pictish stones.

Several interpretations have been proposed for this scene. The most common identifies the bird-figures as demons whispering into the ears of St Anthony during his Temptation. However, it is likely that the human head never had a body as the bird-headed figures were carved around the damaged stone, thus indicating that they predate it. Because of this, some think it unlikely that the scene depicts the Temptation of St Anthony.

Another possibility is that the scene refers to the pre-Christian Celtic cult of the head or Celtic androphagus (man-eating) monster and has been appropriated for a Christian context. This may have been a strategy used by the Pictish church to assert power over any remaining people following non-Christian beliefs and practices. Other interpretations include viewing the scene as a depiction of Hell or else suggest that the bird-headed figures are characters from a now lost Pictish mythology that were once used to refer to religious practices, social histories or cosmological occurrences.

Other hybrid figures can be found on stones throughout Pictland including the Conan Stone, Glamis Manse, the Maiden Stone, Rodney's Stone and Sueno's Stone.
