= Carfrae =

Carfrae is a last name. Notable people with this last name include:

- Ian Carfrae, past member of The New Vaudeville Band
- John Alexander Carfrae (1868–1947), Scottish architect
- Mirinda Carfrae (born 1981), Australian triathlete
- Robert Carfrae (1820–1900), Scottish art collector
- Tristram Carfrae (born 1959), British structural engineer and designer

== See also ==
- Carfrae Bastle, a ruined tower house in Scotland
