= John Duns =

John Duns may refer to:

- John Duns Scotus (c. 1265/66–1308), Scottish Catholic priest and Franciscan friar, university professor, philosopher, and theologian
- John Duns (minister) (1820–1909), Scottish minister and academic
