= B954 road =

Road in Scotland

Coordinates: 56.57603°N 3.15458°W

B954

Major junctions
- North end: Dykends
- South end: Northwestern part of Dundee

Location
- Country: United Kingdom

Road network
- Roads in the United Kingdom; Motorways; A and B road zones

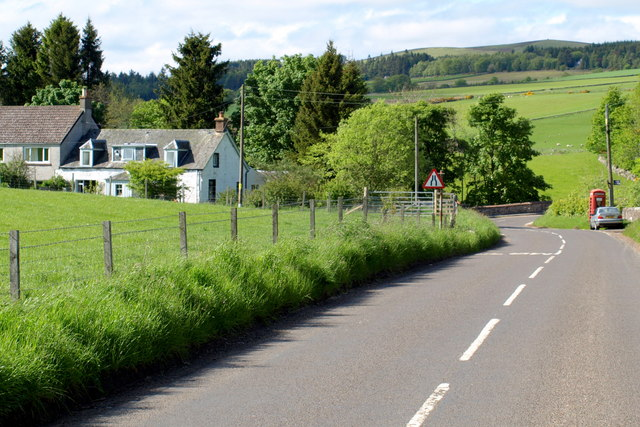
Bridge of Craigisla, taken from the B954 looking north.

The B954 road is a public highway in Angus, Scotland which generally runs north to south, connecting the settlement of Dykends to the northwestern part of the city of Dundee. The road runs near the Meigle Museum, where a collection of Pictish stones is exhibited, and somewhat to the west of the Eassie Stone, a Pictish stone dating to about 600 AD. The road has been a subject of public controversy, having undergone debate over its speed limit; in particular, a speed limit of 30 to 40 miles per hour was considered to protect pedestrian safety, particularly for children crossing the highway. The proposal was not adopted at the 16 September 2008 meeting.
