= Meigle 2 =

Meigle 2, also known as the Daniel Stone, is a Pictish cross-slab from the ninth-century AD carved from Old Red Sandstone. It is now in the Meigle Sculptured Stone Museum, Perth and Kinross, and is one of the largest and most elaborately carved stones in the collection.

Meigle

== Location and discovery ==
Meigle 2 likely originally stood outside in the churchyard at Meigle on the left side of the churchyard gate next to a mound known as Vanora’s Grave.

The Meigle Sculptured Stone Museum houses a collection of 27 Pictish stones dating from the eighth to the tenth centuries. The concentration of a large volume of sculptures at this site suggests that Meigle was once an important Pictish ecclesiastical centre.

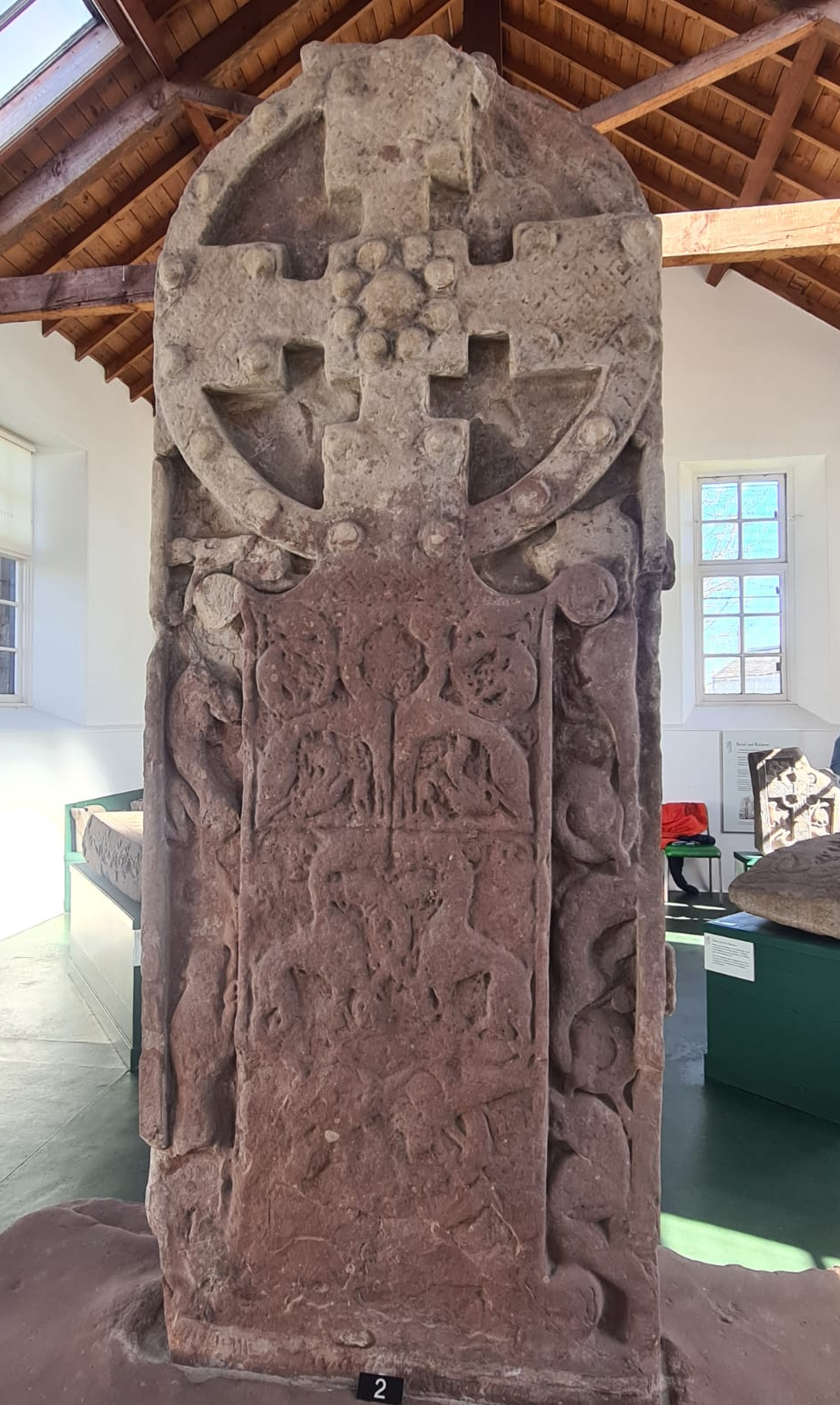
Cross-face of Meigle 2.

== Physical description and weathering ==
Meigle 2 stands at approximately 2.5m and, like all of the stones at Meigle, is carved from Old Red Sandstone. This material is fairly soft and ideal for detailed relief carving. However, due to their soft material, many of the stones at Meigle are poorly preserved and much of their imagery has been eroded.

The stone has four projections on its sides which may have been used as anchor points for ropes and timber supports during the monument’s erection. Alternatively, the projections could indicate that the cross once formed part of a larger architectural arrangement, such as a chancel screen or a funerary chapel.

Differences in the weathering between the lower portions of the cross-slab’s faces imply that the more well preserved reverse face was protected from the elements by an adjacent structure such as Vanora’s Grave. In contrast, the heavier weathering on the obverse may indicate repeated human contact with the stone, such as kneeling against it during prayer.

=== Cross-face (front) ===
The front of Meigle 2 is dominated by a large angular cross decorated with eight large projecting bosses surrounded by eight smaller ones. This skeuomorphic design imitates the crux gemmata and was likely influenced by Pictish metalwork objects which were often inlaid with amber and glass. It is also possible that the eight bosses correspond to the eight days of Passion week or stigmata.

The shaft of the cross is also skeuomorphic in nature, imitating a broad architectural pillar with volutes in the corners that evoke classical columns. Similar pseudo-volutes are also present on the cross at Woodrae.

To the right of the cross, an animal hangs by the neck over a volute while its foot is caught in the jaws of beast below; an image that has been taken to symbolise sin and damnation. On the left side of the cross-shaft, a human figure reaches down to help another up, symbolically saving them from the depths of Hell. This image may have a salvific meaning and may also refer to visions of Hell in English and Irish literature, in which threatening animals are used to warn the viewer of the consequences of sin and encourage repentance.

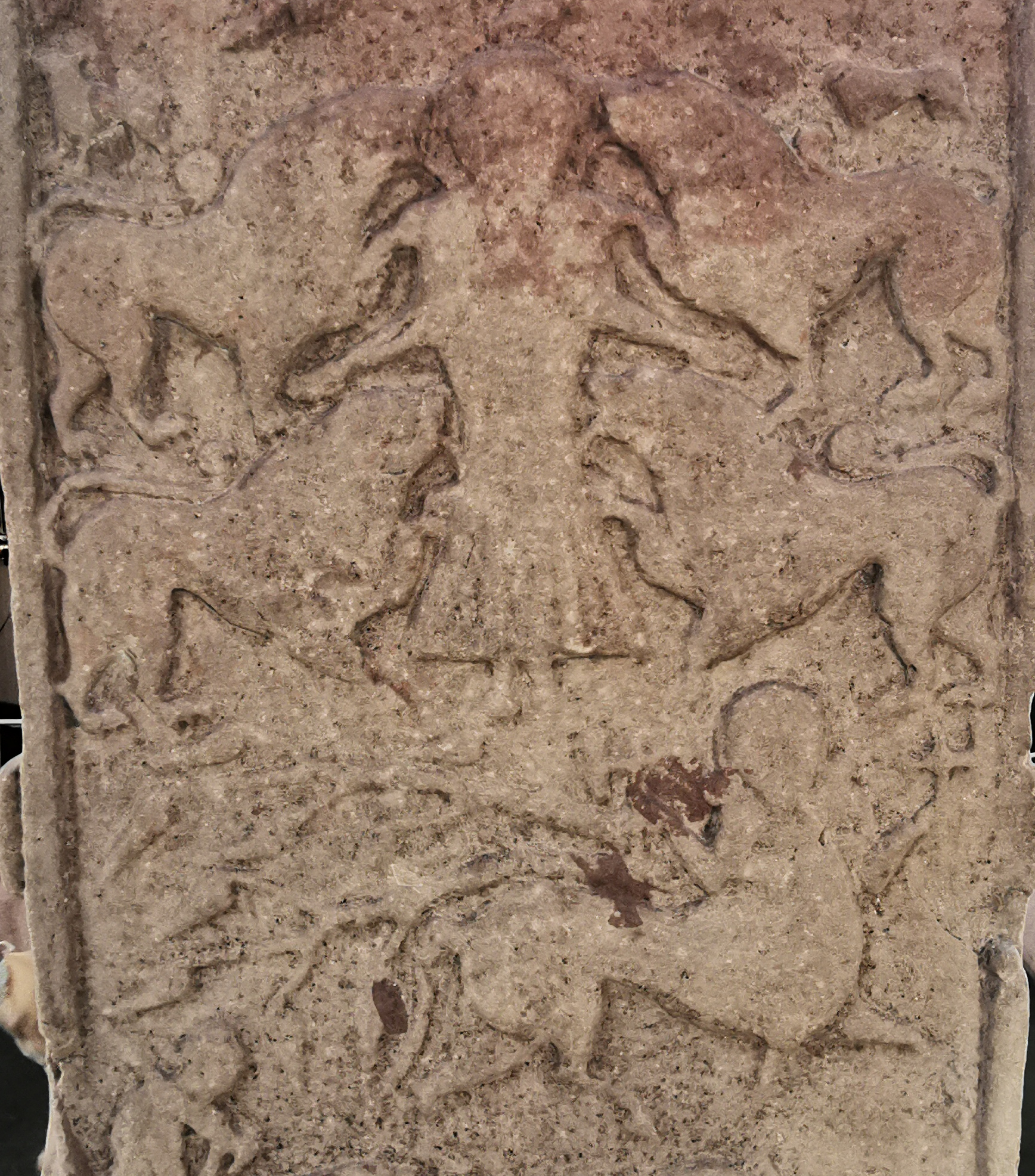
Close-up of the reverse face of Meigle 2.

=== Reverse ===
The reverse of the cross-slab is taken up by several different narrative scenes arranged in horizontal registers.

At the top is a hunting scene with men on horseback accompanied by hunting dogs. The central positioning of the uppermost horse rider suggests that he is likely the leader of the group. The composition and the horses’ stances are evocative of Attic painted vases.

A small seraph or angel appears at the top left and may perform a moral didactic function.

Below the horsemen, a large frontal human figure looks out towards the viewer with raised arms. He is surrounded by four open-mouthed lions who paw at his head and legs. The motif of lions flanking a human figure predates Insular art and similar scenes can be found in numerous artworks including the Sutton Hoo purse lid, the Shroud of St Victor in Sens Cathedral and in the Roman catacombs.

The figure’s long robe with a pleated skirt have previously led to its erroneous identification as female. Due to the figure’s garments, the stone’s original proximity to Vanora’s grave, and a contemporary fascination with Arthurian legend, this scene was once thought to depict Vanora’s execution by wild animals. Vanora is a local variant of Guinevere from Arthurian legend and was abducted by the Pictish king Mordred and kept at Barry hillfort near Meigle. When Vanora was returned to Arthur, she was executed for infidelity and buried at Meigle. It was also said that any women who walked across the grave would become infertile, although this may be a later embellishment to the story meant to deter non-Christian practices around the site.

This scene is now generally accepted as a depiction of Daniel in the lions’ den, hence the stone’s nickname. Other interpretations have suggested scenes from hagiography such as the temptation of St Antony.

Beneath this scene stands a classical centaur brandishing an axe in either arm and a branch of trailing leaves. Possible sources for the centaur on Pictish cross-slabs include the Liber Monstrorum, Marvels of the East, and the Physiologus. The Physiologus describes a particular variant of the centaur, the onocentaur, as having a morally ambiguous nature that symbolises the conflict between good and evil.

Centaurs carrying axes and other weapons occur relatively frequently on Pictish stones such as on Glamis Manse, the Conan Stone, Rhynie Stone and Golspie Stone. The branch tucked under the centaur’s arm, and in particular its naturalistic treatment, is much less common, and has been linked to the similarly naturalistic treatment of the saplings on the left side of the eighth-century Franks Casket and a tree on the front panel of the St Andrew’s Sarcophagus. Trees and foliage in Pictish sculpture and Insular art are usually heavily stylised, such as the vine-scroll on Sueno’s Stone and the Ruthwell Cross, implying that the branch on Meigle 2 is based on a different, possibly late Antique, model.

At the base of the stone, a dragonlike predator encloses its jaws around the head of an ox.
