= William Graham Boss =

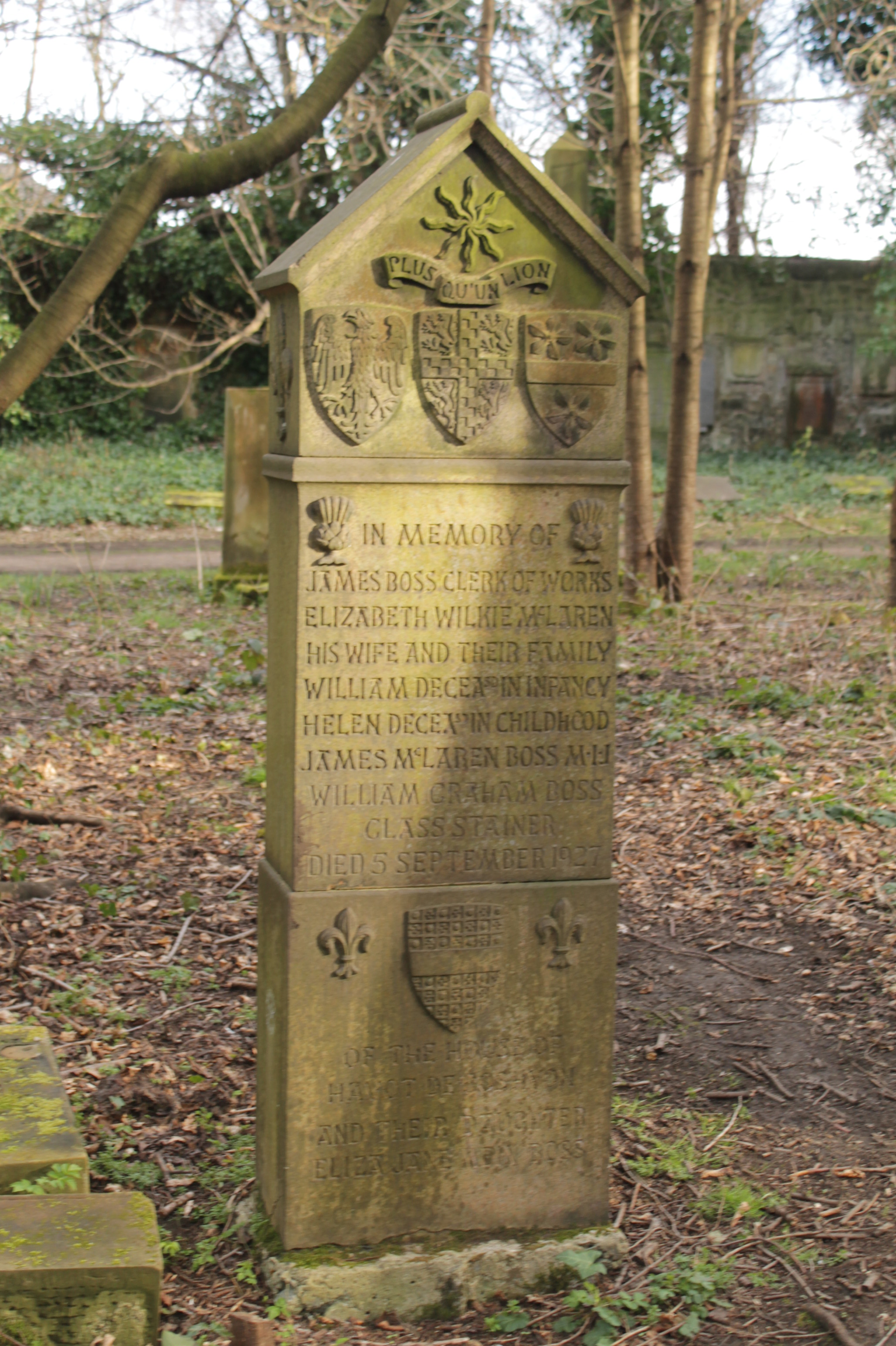
The grave of William Graham Boss

William Graham Boss (1847–1927) was a stained glass designer most noted for his work at the Scottish National Portrait Gallery: a series of stained glass portraits on the main staircase. This was specifically to mark the adaption of the building to accommodate the National Museum of Antiquities from 1891.

== Life ==
He was born in Dunfermline in Fife the son of James Boss (1802–1888) a clerk of works and his wife, Elizabeth Wilkie McLaren (1816–1909). He was a freemason.

From 1875 the family were all living at 11 Lewis Terrace in Edinburgh.

He first appears as a stained glass designer in 1883.

In 1911 he was living at 11 Lewis Terrace in the Dalry Colonies and operated his studio from 16 Union Street at the top of Leith Walk.

He died on 5 September 1927 and is buried with his parents in Warriston Cemetery. The grave lies in a southern section north of the southern path.

== Literature ==
- “An Inquiry regarding the Boss Family and the name Boss (1902)” - This publication is a series of letters exchanged between William Graham Boss of Edinburgh, Scotland and Henry Rush Boss of New York, USA. In this three year exchange, they explore potential family connections and in particular the origin of the surname Boss. WG Boss is the primary contributor to the family history and in this series of letters he explores the origin of the Boss name in Scotland, surname variations over the centuries and in which counties they lived. He makes strong links between the Bosses and Boswells and suggests they arrived in Scotland from Normandy during the 13th century. HR Boss searches for different origins of his particular family and its links to Holland.

== Public works ==
- Magdalen Chapel, Edinburgh (1893)
- Scottish National Portrait Gallery (1894)

The latter contains stained glass portraits by Boss of the various committee members, namely: John Ritchie Findlay, The Marquess of Bute, Sir Herbert Maxwell, Sir Joseph Noel Paton, Sir William Fettes Douglas, Prof William Turner, Robert Cochran-Patrick, Robert Rowand Anderson, Sir Thomas Dawson Brodie, Aeneas James George Mackay, Reginald MacLeod, James MacDonald, David Christison, Robert Munro, 1st Baron Alness, Joseph Anderson, Thomas Dickson, Sir Arthur Mitchell, Robert Carfrae, Rev Professor John Duns, Gilbert Goudie, Adam B. Richardson, and John Taylor Brown.
