= Magdalen Chapel, Edinburgh =

Coordinates: 55.94796°N 3.19245°W

Magdalen Chapel
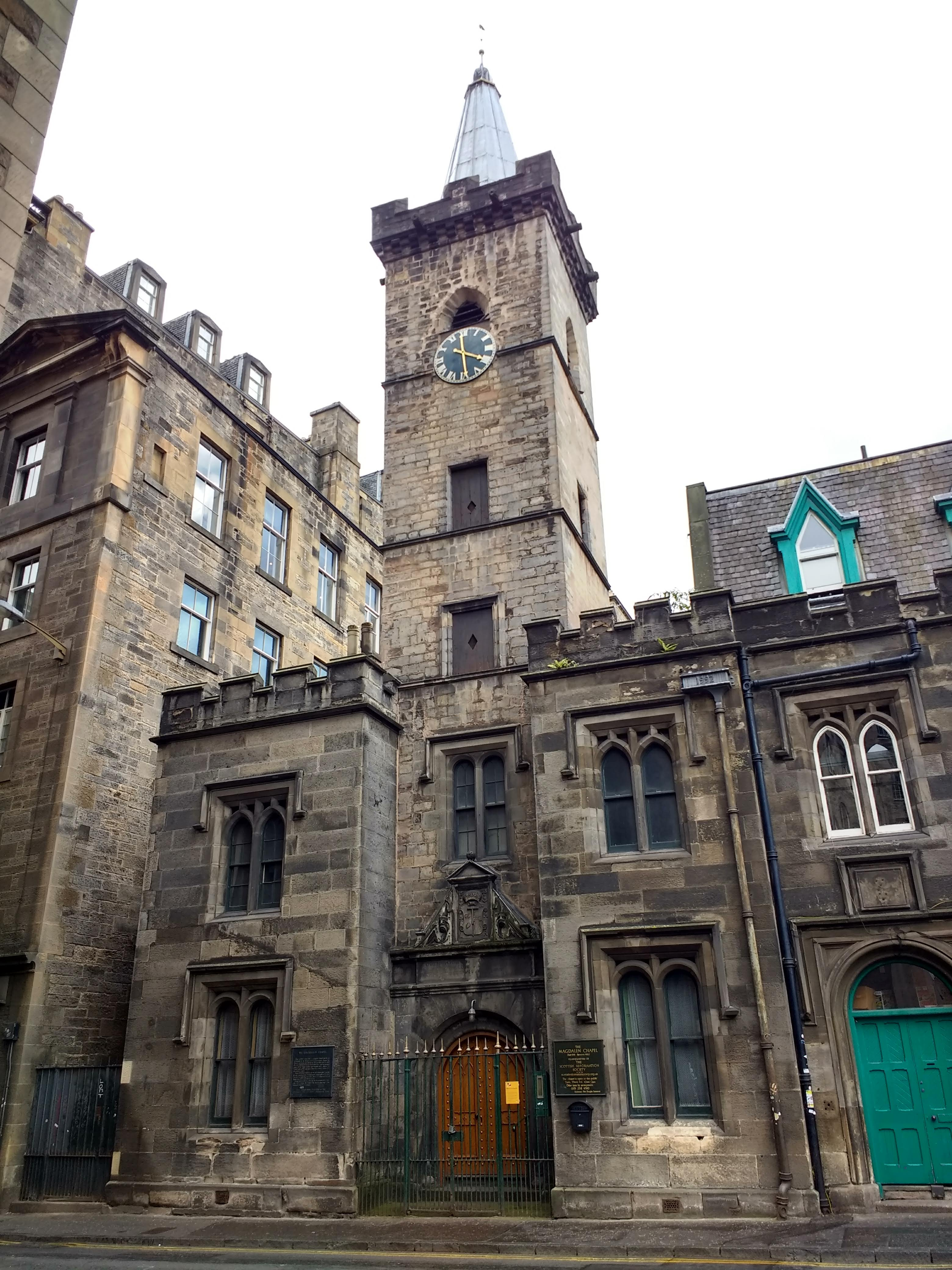
- Magdalen Chapel, Cowgate, Edinburgh

- Location of Magdalen Chapel within central Edinburgh
- Location: Cowgate, Edinburgh
- Country: Scotland
- Denomination: Inter-denominational
- Previous denomination: Roman Catholic, Church of Scotland, Baptist, Episcopalian

History
- Founded: 16th century

Architecture
- Heritage designation: Category A listed building
- Designated: 14 December 1970

Listed Building – Category A
- Official name: 41 Cowgate, Magdalene Chapel
- Designated: 14 December 1970
- Reference no.: LB27110

The Magdalen Chapel (or Magdalene Chapel) is a 16th-century chapel on Cowgate in the Old Town of Edinburgh, Scotland. It is designated as a Category A listed building.

== History ==
=== Michael MacQueen and Jonet Rynd ===
The chapel was built between 1541 and 1544 using money bequeathed by Michael MacQueen or MakQuhen (died 1537), supplemented by his widow, Jonet Rynd or Rhynd. MacQueen was a merchant who supplied spices and linen to the royal household. The Foundation Charter of 1547 reads: "when the said Michael was greatly troubled with an heavy Disease, and oppressed with Age, yet mindful of Eternal Life, he esteemed it ane good Way to obtain Eternal Life, to erect some Christian Work, for ever to remain and endure". It was designed to accommodate a chaplain and act as an almshouse for seven poor men who were to pray for the soul of Mary, Queen of Scots. Prior to the Reformation, the Queen Regent, Mary of Guise arranged academic lectures there.

Jonet Rynd died in December 1553 and was buried in the chapel. Michael MacQueen seems to have had a son Patrick by his first marriage. Another early donor was Isobel Mauchan who gave £1000 Scots in 1555. Isobel was probably a close friend or relation of Jonet Rynd. There seems to have been some friction between the donor families, as a John Rynd was censured for removing Isobel Mauchan's carved coat-of-arms from the chapel.

=== Incorporation of Hammermen ===
Patronage of the chapel passed to the Incorporation of Hammermen (metalworkers) on the death of Janet Rhynd in 1553. After the Reformation, the patrons – the Hammermen – met financial trouble. The chaplain, who remained a Roman Catholic, was replaced by a Protestant minister, but successfully sued to continue to receive his salary until his death in 1567. Under the terms of the Foundation Charter, the Chapel was required to undertake Roman Catholic worship and the Hammermen were prohibited from doing anything against Roman Catholic interests or the property would revert to Janet Rynd's heirs. Since these terms were now breached, the tenants stopped paying their rent, knowing the Hammermen could not force them to pay. Only the wealth of the Hammermen allowed them to continue as patrons. From 1596 it was also the regular meeting place of the Convenery of the Trades of Edinburgh. The meeting-place was so closely identified with the Convenery of Trades that "Magdalen Chapel" was often used as a metonym for the Convenery itself.

The General Assembly of the Church of Scotland was held in the Chapel in April 1578. There is a tradition that the first General Assembly in December 1560 was also held in the Chapel. The Dominican friar turned Reformer John Craig preached in the Chapel, speaking in Latin because he had been out of Scotland for so many years.

Several conventicles of the Covenanters were held in the Chapel, the largest being that of 17 May 1674 at which William Weir was the preacher. The bodies of the Marquis of Argyle in 1661, Hew Mackail in 1666, and John Dick in 1684 were prepared for burial in the chapel after they were executed. The heads and hands of martyred Covenanters were displayed in various locations in Edinburgh in 1689, and were collected at the chapel prior to burial in Greyfriars Kirk.

The Chapel was used by Episcopalians, and notably housed the second Baptist congregation in Edinburgh in the 18th century. This Baptist church originated in 1765 when Robert Carmichael, a minister from an Old Scots Independent congregation in Candlemakers’ Hall, became convinced that baptism should be for believers only and by immersion. In May 1765, Carmichael and seven others withdrew from their Independent church and formed a new fellowship in the Magdalen Chapel. After being baptized himself in London, Carmichael baptized four men and three women in the Water of Leith at Canonmills on 25 November 1765, an event partially witnessed and reported by The Scots Magazine. The Baptists worshipped here regularly till 1774.

A printing press was located either in the Chapel or a nearby building in the 18th century. In the early nineteenth century it was used as a place of worship by the Bereans, a Protestant sect following former Scottish Presbyterian minister John Barclay (1734-1798) who held to a modified form of Calvinism. The Hammermen sold the chapel in 1857 to the Protestant Institute for Scotland, and it was used by the Edinburgh Medical Missionary Society.

Following a fund-raising campaign supported by Alex Neish, Architects Simpson and Brown undertook a major restoration programme in 1992/93. It is now the headquarters of the Scottish Reformation Society.

== Design features ==
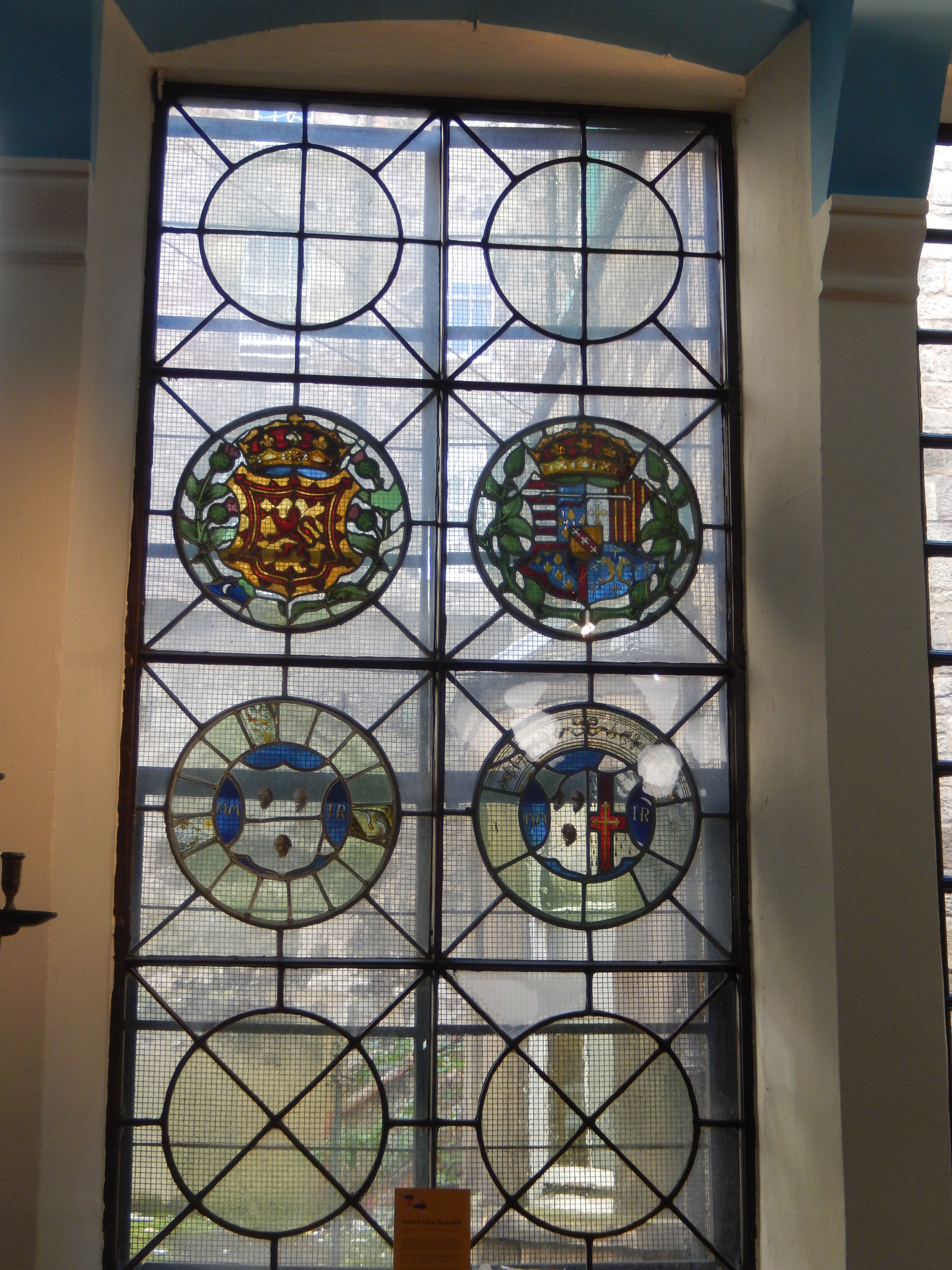
Pre-Reformation stained glass in the chapel.

An inscription over the door reads 'He that hath pity upon the poore lendeth unto the Lord and the Lord will recompence him that which he hath given, Pro. XIX vers XVII.'

A semi-circular wooden platform was installed at the east end around 1615 and the layout of the Chapel was altered. The carved armorial panel over the door was created by John Sawer in the same year, and was moved to its current location in 1649. The tower and spire were added about 1620. A bell, by the Dutch bell founder Michael Burgerhuys of Middelburg, dates from 1632. The original ceiling, no longer extant, was painted in 1725 by Alexander Boswall in 'skye colour with clouds and a sin (sic: sun) gilded in the centre'. ' A fragment is on display on the south wall. The panelling records gifts from members of the Incorporation of Hammermen. The stained glass in the middle window of the south wall features the Royal Arms of Scotland and the Arms of Mary of Guise. It is the only intact pre-Reformation stained glass window in Scotland.

A sword that reputedly belonged to the Covenanter Captain John Paton and the table used to prepare the bodies of the Covenanters for burial (after their execution in the nearby Grassmarket) are still present in the chapel. Janet Rynd's tomb, with her coat of arms and an inscribed border, is in the south east of the church.

Stained glass in the main south window dates from 1893 and is by William Graham Boss.
