= Robert Carfrae =

Curator of the Museum of Antiquities of Scotland

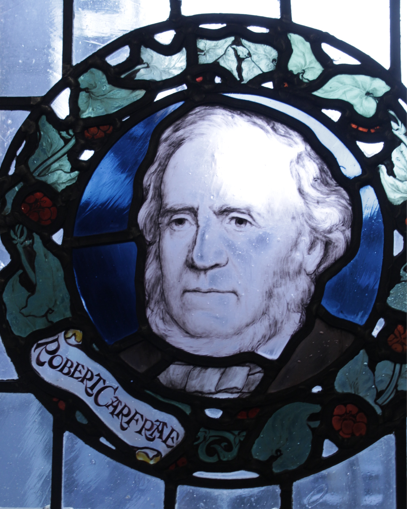
Stained glass of Robert Carfrae in Scottish National Portrait Gallery

Robert Carfrae FSAScot (1820–1900) was Curator of the Museum of Antiquities of Scotland. He accumulated a large art and coin collection. By profession he was a furniture maker, having been involved in the firms Bonnar & Carfrae and Moxon & Co. A noted numismologist he left a huge collection of Greek coins. He gives his name to the Carfrae Collection: a number of ancient Greek and Roman coins now held by the British Museum.

== Life ==
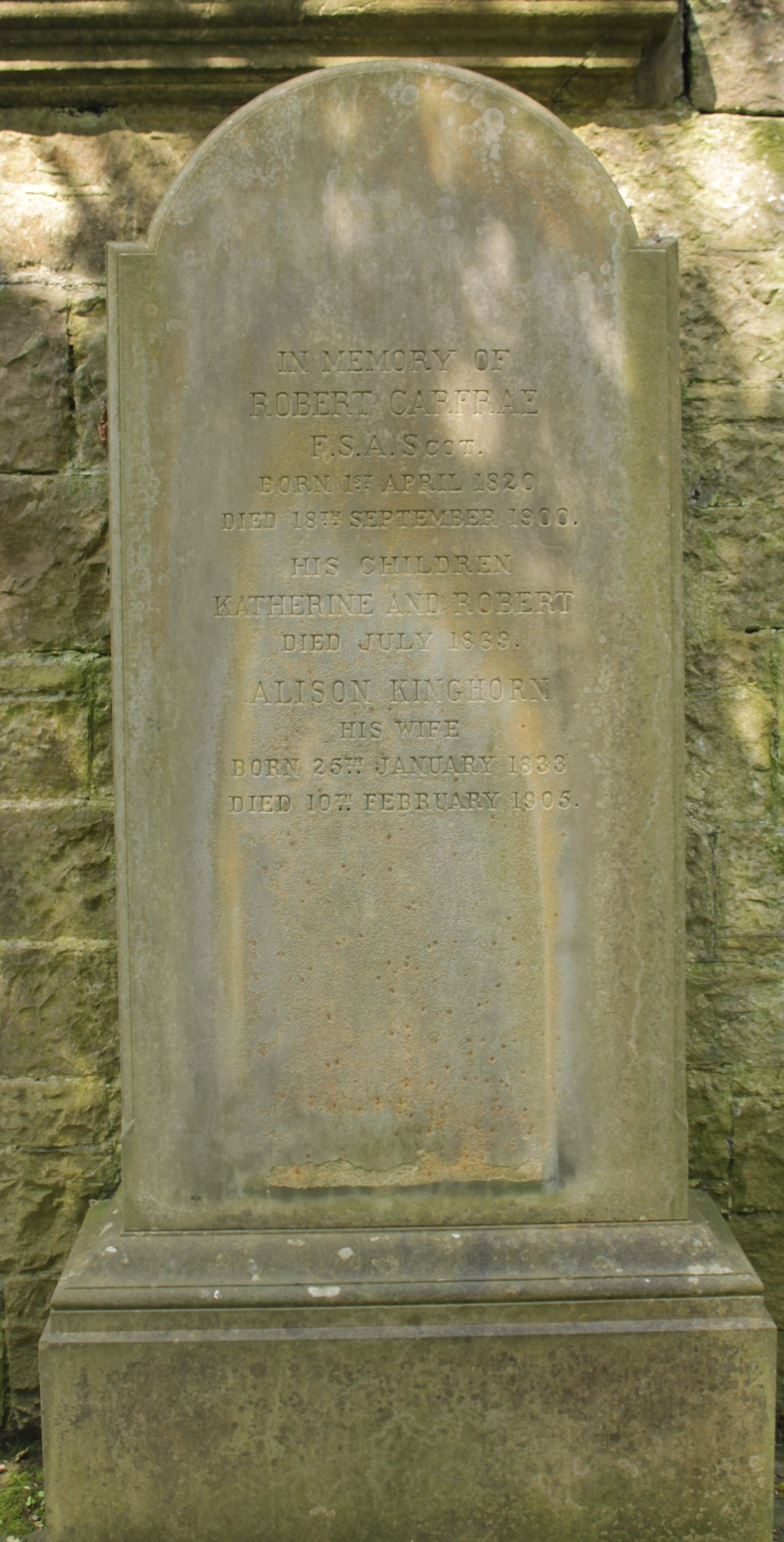
The grave of Robert Carfrae, Dean Cemetery

He was born on 1 April 1820 the son of Robert Carfrae a jeweller and silversmith living at 17 Union Place at the head of Leith Walk in Edinburgh. The family were originally from East Lothian.

In 1860 he was in partnership with Thomas Bonnar's company, together decorating many fine Edinburgh houses: Bonnar seems to be responsible for plasterwork; Carfrae for decorative ironwork, staircases, fireplaces etc. Larger commissions included the interiors of the Royal Scottish Academy and National Gallery of Scotland.

From at least 1866 he was Curator of the Museum of Antiquities.

In 1878 he is noted as acquiring 5 watercolours by William Blake.

In 1884 he went into partnership with John Moxon of Edinburgh creating Moxon & Carfrae.

In 1886 he was living at 3 Osborne Terrace, facing Donaldson's School.

His huge coin collection was split during his final years: a large proportion was sold to Thomas Coats of Paisley; a second section was auctioned at Sotheby's; and a third section was donated to the National Museum of Antiquities.

He died at Montrave, a villa in the Murrayfield area of West Edinburgh on 18 September 1900. He is buried in Dean Cemetery in the concealed lower terrace.

== Family ==
He was married to Alison Kinghorn (1833-1905) from Liverpool. Their children Katherine and Robert both died in July 1869.

Their daughter Mary Carfrae lived 1865 to 1927. She married James Hume Notman (d.1934). Alison Carfrae was born in 1876.

== Artistic recognition ==
His portrait in stained glass by William Graham Boss forms one of the multiple portraits of committee members on the main stair of the Scottish National Portrait Gallery.
