= Gilbert Goudie =

Scottish banker and author

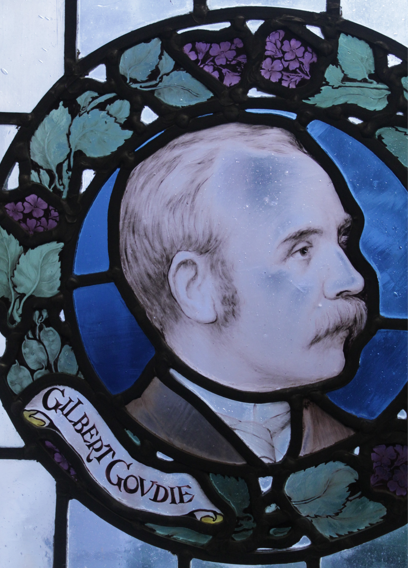
Stained glass of Gilbert Goudie in Scottish National Portrait Gallery

Gilbert Goudie FSAScot (1843–1918) was a Scottish banker, author, antiquary and amateur archaeologist. He was Treasurer of the Society of Antiquaries of Scotland.

== Life ==
He was born in Clumlie on the Shetland Isles on 23 April 1843 the son of Gilbert Goudie of Braefield (1796-1891) and his wife Jean Black (1802-1878)

He moved to Edinburgh in 1853, living in a flat at 32 Dundas Street with his uncle.

Gilbert went into banking joining the National Bank. In 1873 he was living at 47 Ann Street, a charming Georgian house in the Stockbridge area.

In 1875 he found a Pictish stone on St Ninian's Isle. In 1869 and 1888 he excavated the Levenwick and Clumlie brochs.

In 1910 he was living at 31 Great King Street, a very fine three storey and basement Georgian townhouse in Edinburgh's Second New Town.

He died at Great King Street in Edinburgh on 8 January 1918.

== Family ==
In September 1881 he married a widow, Anna Ross (née Anderson) born 1849 in Largo, Fife. They were married by Rev John McMurtrie in a private service at 14 Dean Terrace. They had one son, Gilbert John Goudie (1884-1899). Anna died in 1914. In November 1916 (aged 73) he married Anna Margarita Jean Young, around 50 years his junior.

== Selected publications ==
- The Orkneyinga Saga (1873)
- Notes on the Great Libraries of Scandinavia
- On the Horizontal Water Mills of Shetland (1885)
- The Danish Claims Upon Orkney and Scotland (1887)
- The Diary of Rev John Mill (1889)
- The Celtic and Scandinavian Antiquities of Scotland (1904)

== Artistic recognition ==
His portrait in stained glass by William Graham Boss forms one of multiple portraits of committee members of the Society of Antiquaries of Scotland on the main stair at the National Portrait gallery, Edinburgh.
