= Meigle Sculptured Stone Museum =

Museum in Perth and Kinross, Scotland

Coordinates: 56°35′16.355″N 3°9′45.021″W

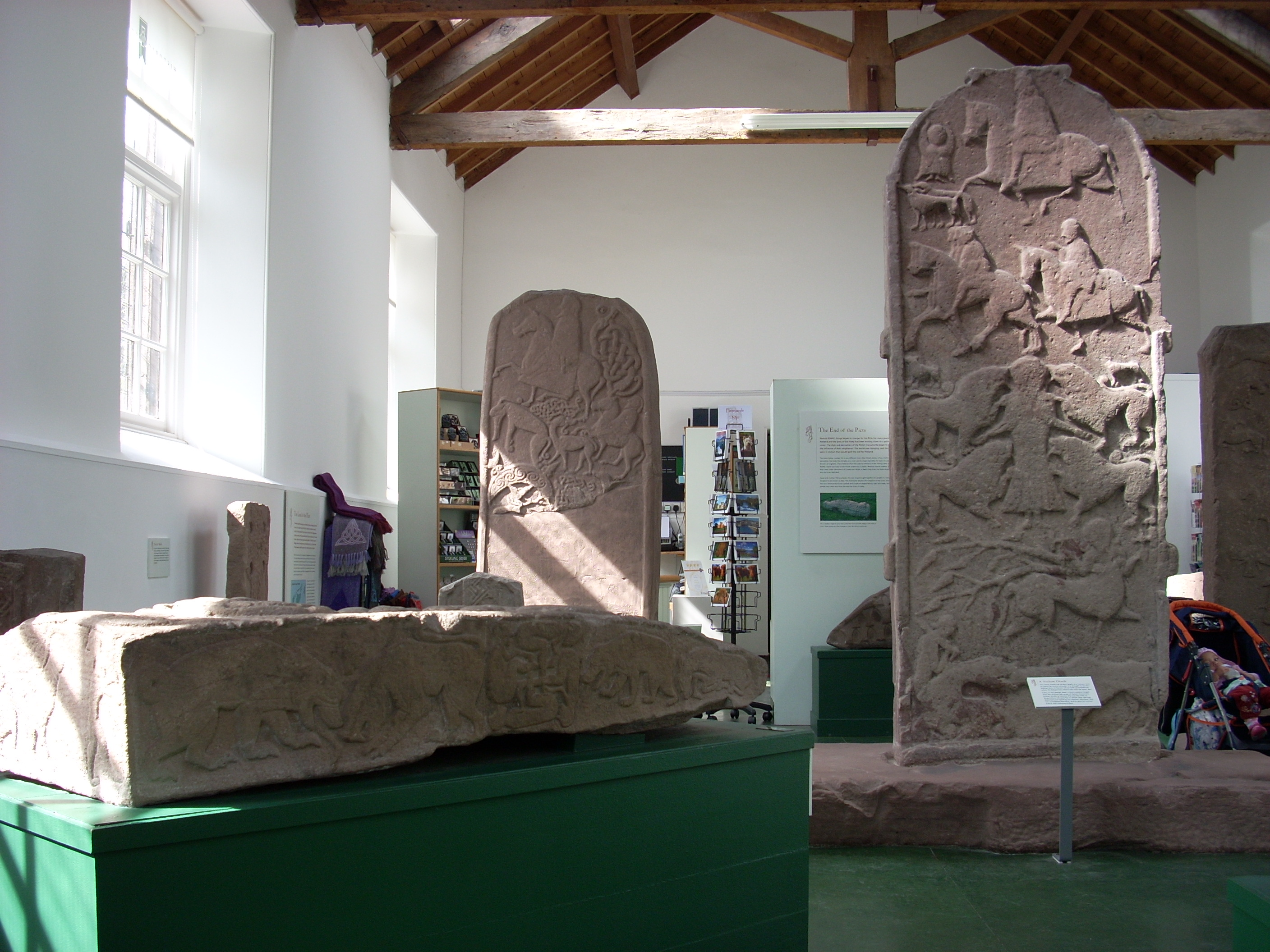
View of the Meigle museum including the backs of Meigle 4 at left and Meigle 2 at right, with one side of Meigle 26 in the foreground.

The Meigle Sculptured Stone Museum is a permanent exhibition of 27 carved Pictish stones in the centre of the village of Meigle in Perth and Kinross in eastern Scotland. It lies on the A94 road running from Coupar Angus to Forfar. The museum occupies the former parish school, built 1844. The collection of stones implies that an important church was located nearby, or perhaps a monastery. There is an early historical record of the work of Thana, son of Dudabrach, who was at Meigle (recorded as Migdele) in the middle of the 9th century during the reign of King Pherath. Thana was likely to have been a monk serving as a scribe in a local monastery that could have been founded in the 8th century. The stones contained in the museum were all found near Meigle, mostly in the neighbouring churchyard or used in the construction of the old church. The present church building dates to about 1870, the previous building having been destroyed in a fire on 28 March 1869. The stones were rescued by William Galloway immediately after the fire. The stones are Christian monuments to the dead of the Pictish warrior aristocracy, who are depicted on the stones bearing their weapons or hunting.

== The museum ==
The museum building was originally the village schoolhouse. The building was purchased by the local laird Sir George Kinloch towards the end of the 19th century in order to protect the symbol stones. In 1936 the museum passed into the ownership of the State, it was renovated after the Second World War and reopened to the public in 1949. The building is Category C listed.

== The stones ==
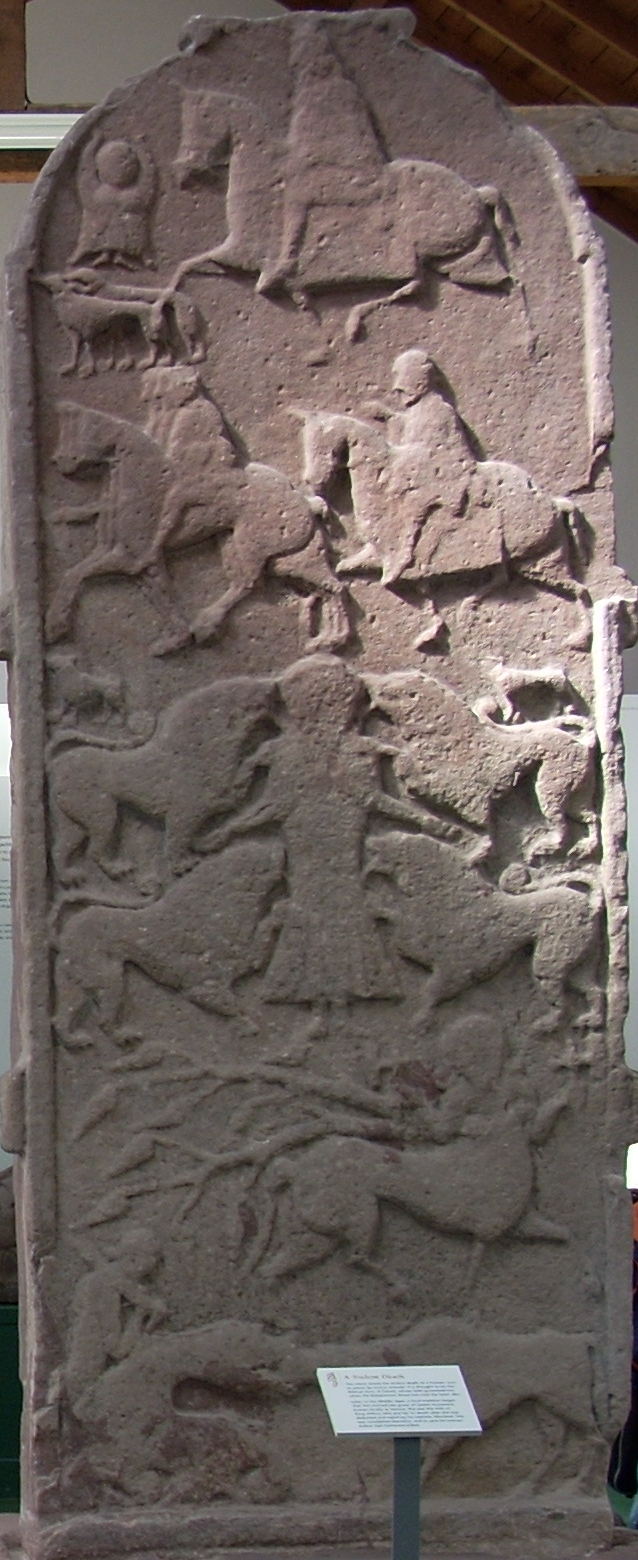
Meigle 2, depicting Daniel in the lions' den and interpreted in local folklore as Vanora, wife of King Arthur, being fed to wild beasts in punishment for her enforced infidelity.

About one third of the stones in the museum are Class II in nature (stones with symbols carved in relief and usually bearing a Christian cross). Most of the stones date to the 9th or 10th century AD and were intended as tombstones. The stones are carved from the local sandstone, which is suitable for fine sculpture. Some stylistic elements of the stones show the influence of Northumbria. The Pictish stones at Meigle have a distinct local style that includes an emphasis on aggressive biting beasts, the decorating of crosses with a diagonal key pattern and the usage of rounded heads on cross-slabs.

The sandstone used to sculpt the monuments is old red sandstone, a relatively soft stone that lends itself to detailed carving but is susceptible to erosion. The monuments are likely to have been worked with iron tools such as chisels, punches and hammers, together with hammerstones and wooden mallets. The sculpted designs may have been copied from painted vellum pattern books.

According to the local records, eight stones were lost before the close of the 19th century, including Meigle 10. Some of the surviving stones are parts of larger monuments and it is probable that other fragments are buried in Meigle churchyard or have been used in the construction of walls. Before being moved into the museum, Meigle 1 and Meigle 2 stood on either side of the northern entrance to the churchyard, in front of a grass-covered mound called Vanora's Grave. Some of the stones appear to have been trimmed and placed near the Grave in the 16th and 17th centuries in order to decorate it.

Meigle 1 is a cross-slab. The stone was originally used as a standing stone two millennia before it was sculpted by the Picts, it has cup and ring marks low down on the back of the stone. The cross is Greek in style, with full circles at each of the four handles between the shaft and the arms. The inside of the cross is decorated with interlace patterns, the cross-point being decorated with spirals. The cross shaft itself is flanked by images of mythical beasts. It has an uncoordinated jumble of symbols arranged around a hunting scene on the other side. Among these are images of a winged figure that perhaps represents a Persian deity and of a kneeling camel, as well as a Pictish Beast, salmon, a serpent and Z-rod, a mirror, a comb, a dog's head, animals and horsemen. This stone originally stood on the west side of the northern entrance to the churchyard, opposite Meigle 2. Meigle 1 may be the oldest stone at Meigle, possibly carved in the late 8th century.

Meigle 2 stands nearly 2.5 metres (8.2 ft) high. It has a cross on one side and depicts Daniel in the lions' den on the other. The form of the head of the cross is possibly based on that of a jewelled metal cross and is unique. The projecting boss at the centre of the cross has eight smaller bosses around it that probably symbolise the eight days of Passion Week running from Palm Sunday to Easter Sunday inclusive. The shaft of the cross contains three pairs of sculpted animals facing each other, with interlaced tails and tongues, while other beasts fill the space between the cross and the outer border of the monument. The monument is the work of a master sculptor with the figures being cut in deep relief and arranged in an orderly fashion. Meigle 2 has projecting tenons on its top and sides and was probably intended to slot into a screen or wall. Local folklore holds that the representation of Daniel in the lions' den depicts King Arthur's wife Guinevere, known locally as Vanora. She was abducted by King Mordred and condemned by Arthur to be torn apart by wild beasts. The monument was said to mark her grave. Meigle 2 was originally located on the east side of the northern entrance to the churchyard, opposite Meigle 1, and in front of a mound identified in local folklore as Vanora's Grave. Apart from the scene representing Daniel, the back of the monument also contains various other sections. These include a mounted huntsman with two hounds at the top, with an angel hovering above the dogs. Below this there is a procession of four horsemen, with three leading the fourth, who is distinguished by a large saddlecloth. The next row down is the Biblical Daniel scene, below this is a centaur holding an axe in each hand and branches trailing behind him. The lowest section depicts a beast grasping an ox, a club-wielding human figure is positioned behind the aggressor. The stone has lost some detail due to erosion, although this is concentrated at the lower part of the cross itself and suggests that some form of human activity regularly caused abrasion of that portion - the opposite side being less worn.

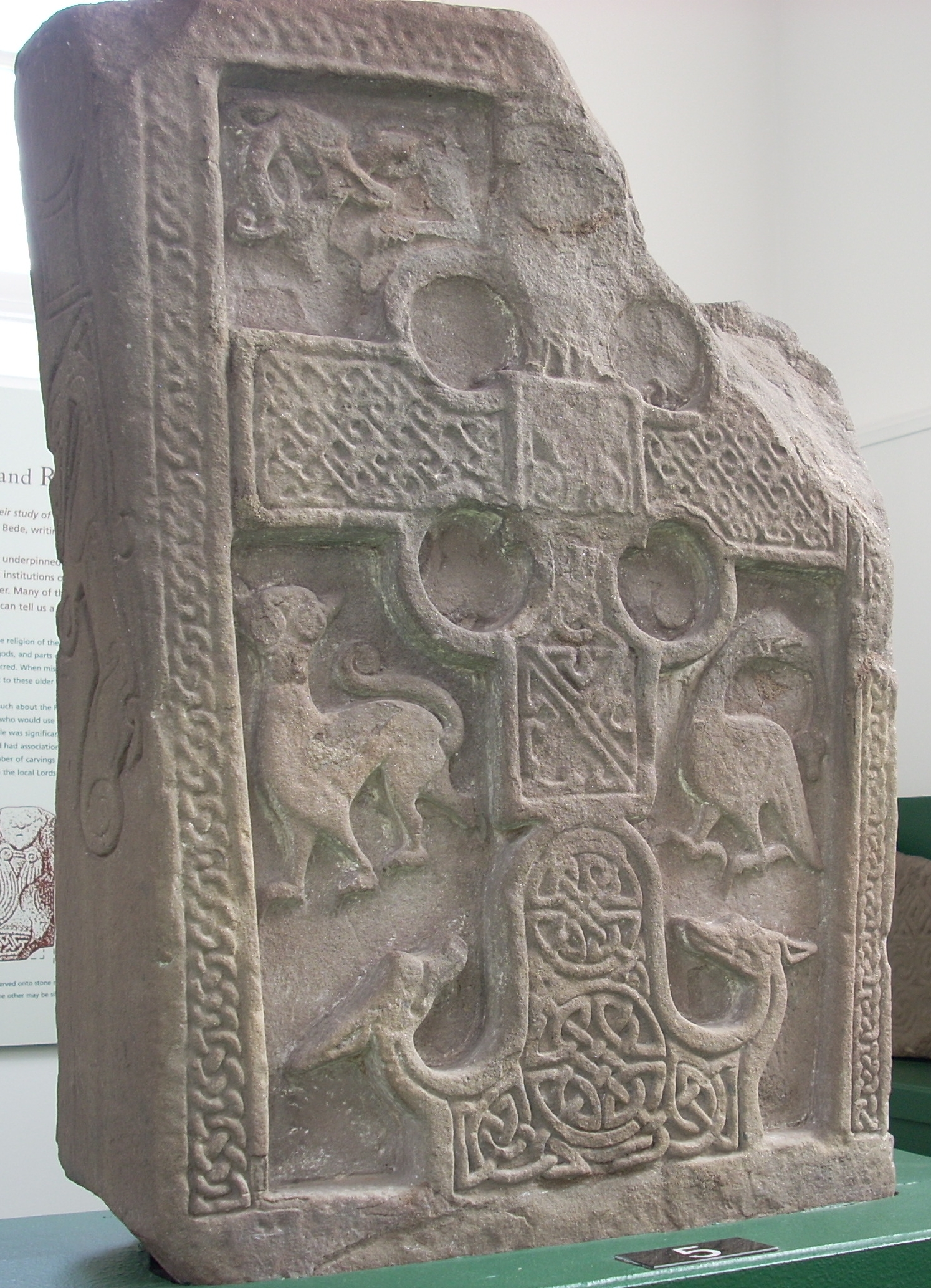
Meigle 5, the base of the cross has the unusual embellishment of two upward-curving animal heads.

Meigle 3 dates to the 9th century AD. One side has a cross, with a part of a Pictish double-disc symbol to the left, below the arm. On the other is inscribed a mounted warrior wearing a sword below his cape, the scabbard tipped with a chape. The warrior is seated on a striped saddle cloth and carries a spear in his right hand. Meigle 3 is a low gravestone and the warrior may be a portrait of the deceased person. The stone was cut shorter at least twice in antiquity, its original height may have been 0.6 metres (24 in).

Meigle 4 is a fragmented cross-slab with the central portion missing, the surviving fragments are masterpieces of sculpture. Animals are carved on either side of the top of the cross, with their heads curving up to bite two animals forming the frame of the design. There is an animal below the left arm of the cross with elaborate entwined tail and horns. Opposite this, below the right arm of the cross, is the upper portion of a person struggling against an animal. The inside of the cross is filled with interlace patterns. The reverse of the monument has tightly packed figures and symbols. A mounted horseman occupies the top of the stone, with two interlaced serpents behind. Under the horse's hooves is another entwined serpent, a Pictish Beast and another animal, with another horseman behind. A crescent with V rod symbol occupies the lowest portion of the stone.

Meigle 5 has a cross carved in high relief on one side. The base of this Greek-style cross sports the unusual decoration of two animal heads. Each quarter of the background contains a single beast. Meigle 5 is a small monument and was carved as an upright headstone for a grave. The back of the stone depicts a lone horseman with a decorated saddle-cloth. On one edge of the monument are inscribed two symbols; the so-called Pictish Beast and a mirror.

Meigle 6 is the central fragment of a cross-slab. The surviving shaft of the cross is decorated with a diagonal key pattern. The back of the stone has, from top to bottom, a horse and rider, a double disc symbol, a crescent and a dog wearing a collar.

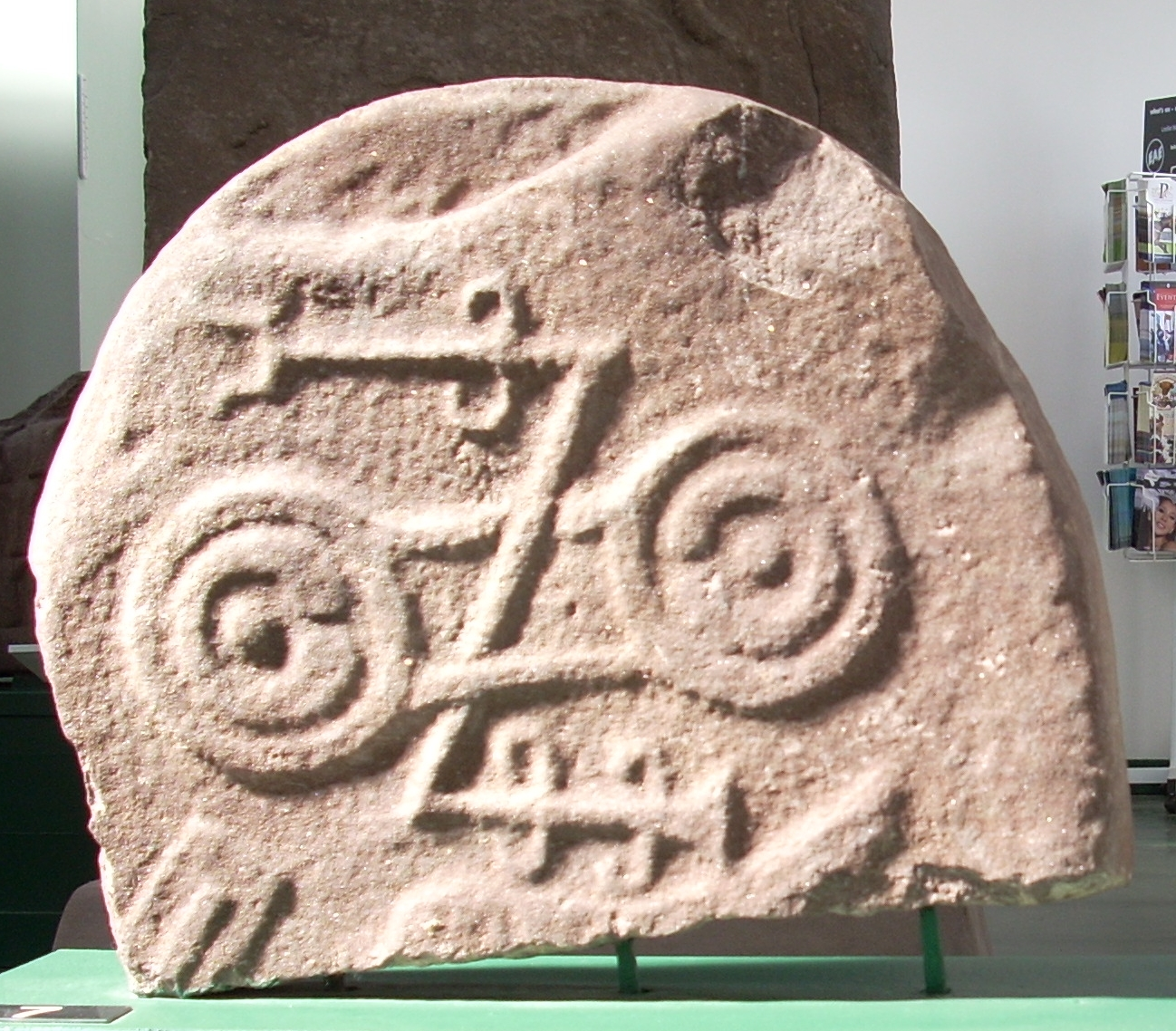
The back of Meigle 7 showing Z-rod and discs.

Meigle 7 is the top portion of a rounded cross-slab. The cross is decorated with a diagonal key pattern. The back of the monument has a double disc and Z-rod and a comb.

Meigle 8 is a small fragment measuring 0.22 metres (8.7 in) across. It has an eroded cross on one side and the upper portion of two animals on the reverse, facing each other with forelegs in the opposing beast's mouth. A symbol above them may represent a tool.

Meigle 9 is a recumbent tombstone. It has a shallow slot in the top and sculpted panels on both long sides. One of the panels depicts a griffin, an interlace pattern, an elongated animal wrapped into a knot and two animals facing each other. The other panel is composed of an animal, a sitting person with his limbs entwined with the legs of a bird, another animal, some spiral patterns and a final section that is badly eroded.

Meigle 10 is now lost. It was a carved rectangular panel depicting a horse pulling a carriage bearing a driver and two passengers, the monument also showed a crouching archer and several beasts. The sculpture probably formed a part of a low church screen, possibly separating the chancel and the nave. The stone had been moved inside the old church for protection and was destroyed in the fire of 1869.

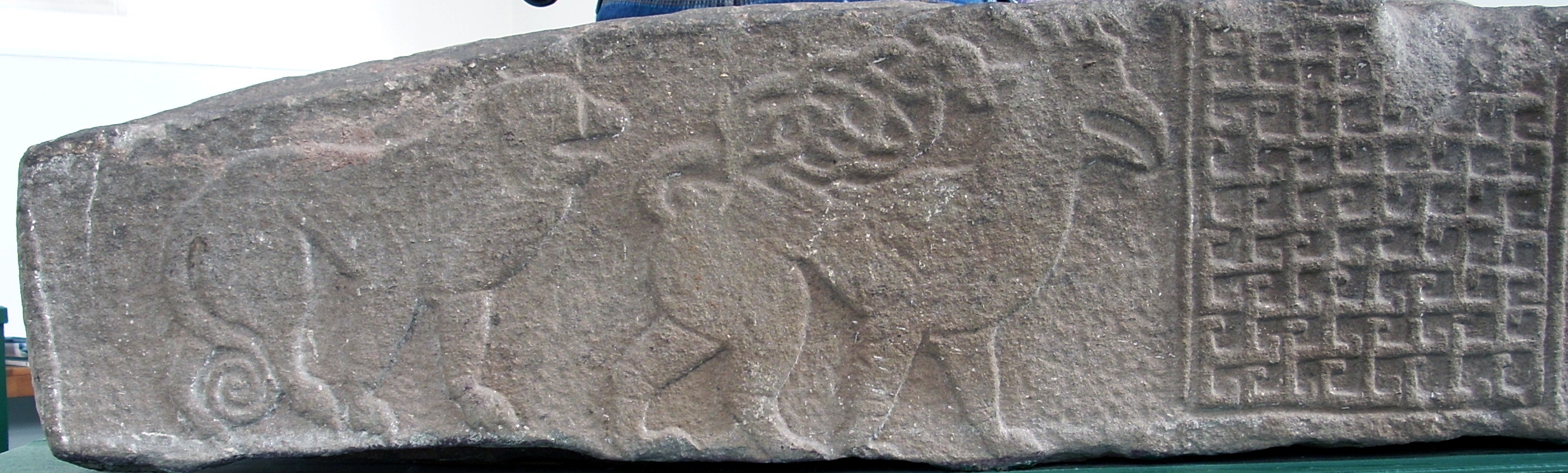
Detail of one side of Meigle 26.

Meigle 11 is another recumbent monument and is the largest of the recumbent stones from Meigle. The long sides of the stone have deeply recessed panels with wide borders that once were decorated but are badly worn. The top of the monument is undecorated and has a wide slot at one end. One side of the stone has the sculpted images of three mounted riders accompanied by a dog, behind them is a humanoid figure with an animal's head and gripping two entwined serpents. The other side of the monument is decorated with two intertwined animals followed by a dog and a bear, one above the other, and an unidentified object. To the right of these is a panel of twelve bosses encircled by serpents. At the extreme right is a wheel of seven bosses set within a frame formed of two upright animals with entwined tails and gripping the extremities of a human figure in their mouths.

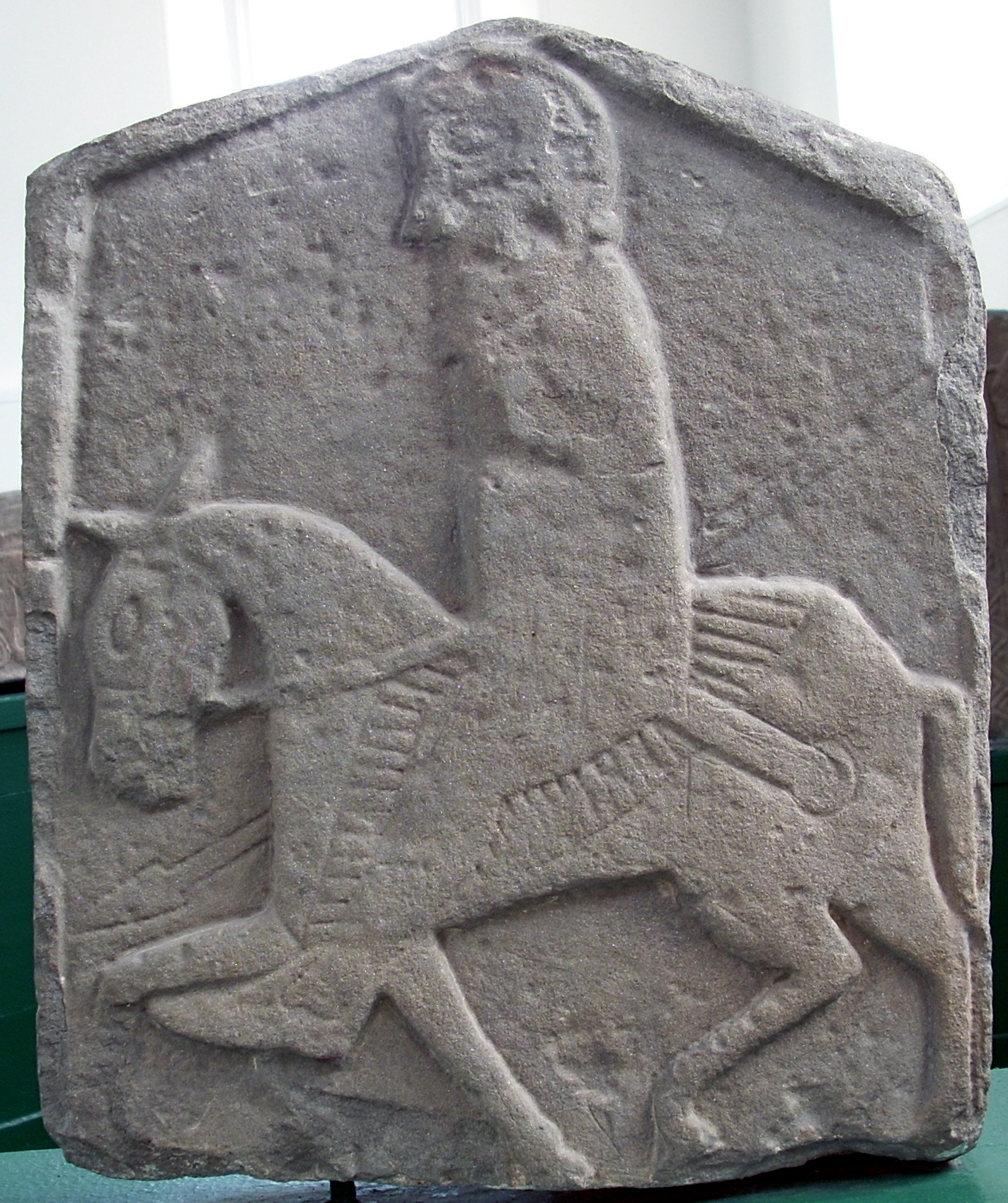
Meigle 3, showing a Pictish horseman and details of his costume and weapons.

Meigle 12 is one of the last monuments from Meigle. It is a recumbent gravestone sculpted with a lozenge pattern along the upper surface and with a fish monster and an animal on one side. The other side has a dog biting the leg of a deer and two bulls charging each other. Both ends of the monument are damaged.

Meigle 13 was a piece of a broken cross-slab, now lost.

Meigle 14 is a fragment of a cross-slab. Another fragment of the same monument was built into the old church and was destroyed in the fire. The surviving fragment of cross is filled with interlace and a diagonal key pattern. The reverse side shows a robed cleric carrying a book and a part of a second similar figure, the lost section had the rest of this second figure and a third figure almost identical to the first, facing in the opposite direction.

Meigle 15 is a fragment from the shaft of a small cross-slab. The shaft of the cross is filled with an interlace pattern, on the left are two fighting beasts, on the right side is another animal biting its own back.

Meigle 16 through to Meigle 19 were all fragments of cross-slabs and are now lost.

Meigle 20 is a fragment from the centre of a cross-slab. The shaft is filled with interlace and the fragment also has the carved image of a rider.

Meigle 21 is a portion of a cross slab. It was tall and narrow, the head of the cross being filled with a diagonal key pattern while the circle of the head was formed by sculpted ropework. The shaft of the cross is decorated with an interwoven pattern.

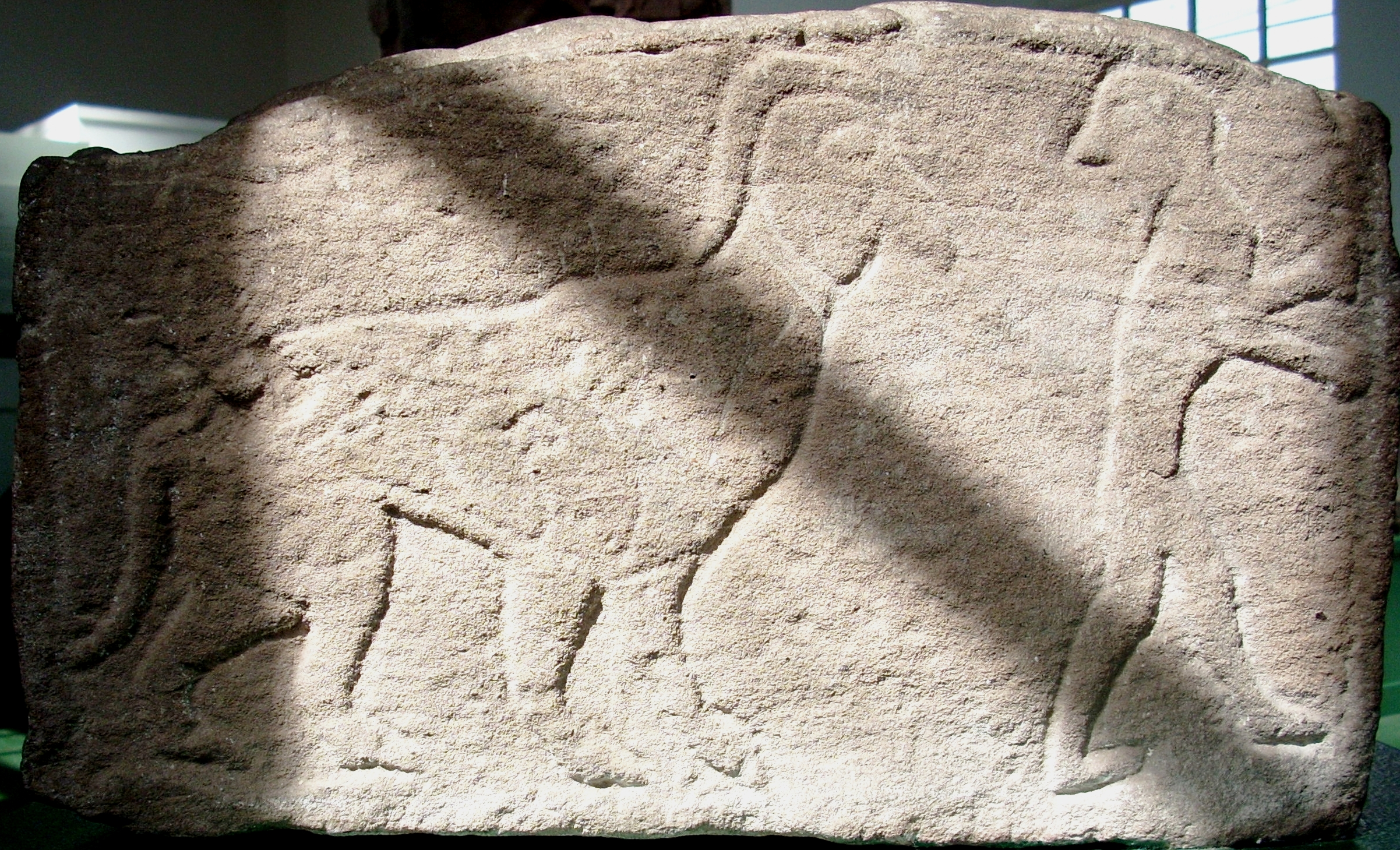
One end of Meigle 26, depicting a man and a manticore.

Meigle 22 is a piece of an architectural frieze bearing a sculpture of what has been identified as either the Pictish form of the Celtic god Cernunnos or else a siren, cross-legged with the entwined legs terminating in fish-tails. The figure is flanked by two animals with prominent claws.

Meigle 23 is a small tombstone with a ringed cross on one side between two seated figures and with two pairs of animals decorating the back. The upper pair of animals have their heads apparently joined together, the lower pair are entwined and each bites the other's tail.

Meigle 24 is one of the lost monuments. It was a small cross-slab.

Meigle 25 is a hogback tombstone dating to the late 10th century. The sides of the monument are decorated with carved rooftiles and the ridge of the recumbent stone is sculpted with a fishtailed beast. The stone tapers at one end, and the sides of the monument together with this tapering end are sculpted with concave-sided roof-tiles. The stone demonstrates stylistic affinities with early hogback stones from the Glasgow area. The ridge of the stone is carved with an elongated beast with its head at the higher end of the monument, the beast has the tail of a fish at the tapering end if the stone. The creature's head is similar to the heads of animals on Meigle 1 and Meigle 5.

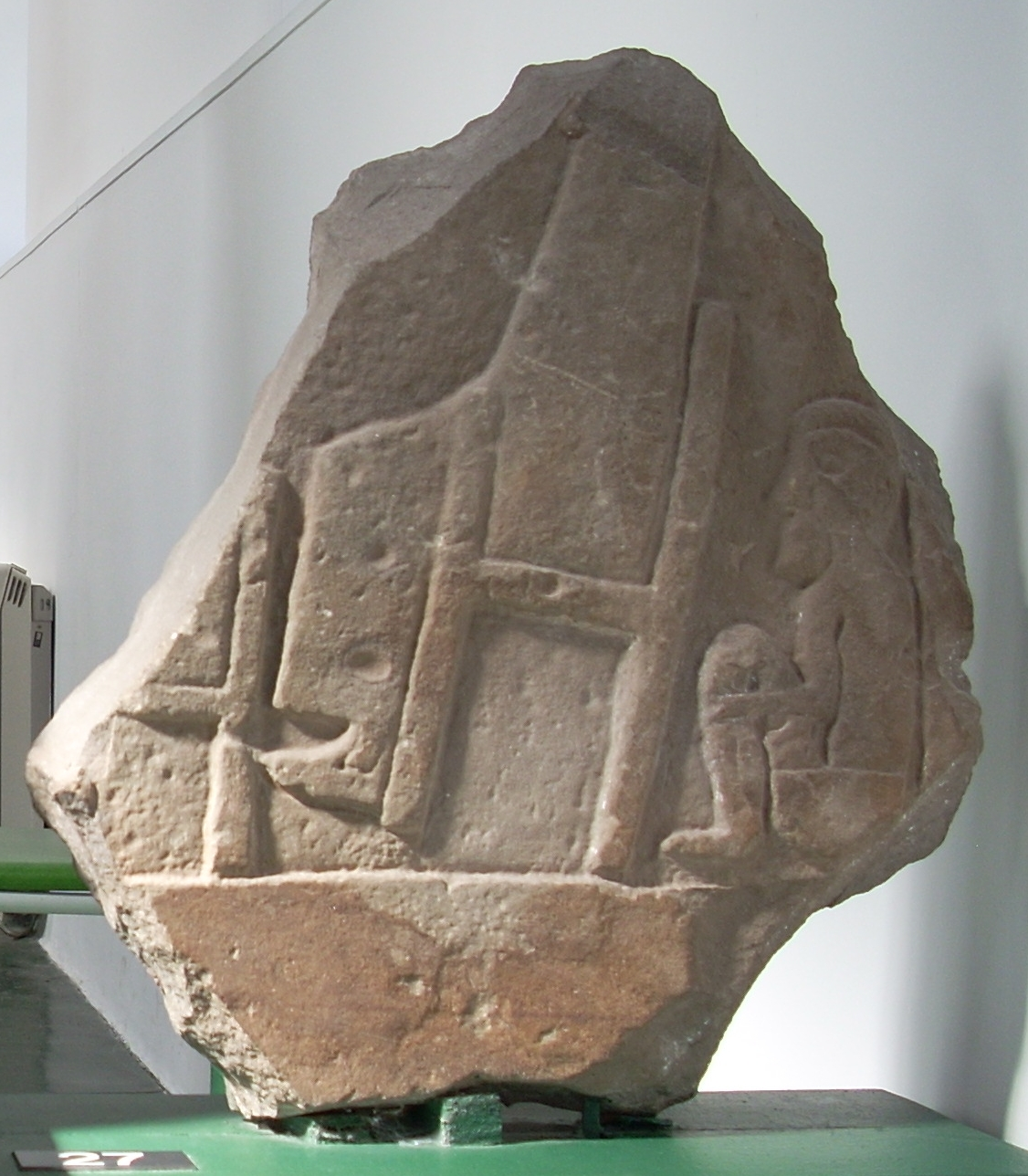
Meigle 27 depicting a figure seated in a chair with his servant sitting on the floor behind.

Meigle 26 is an exceptionally fine recumbent gravestone. It has a socket at one end to hold a vertical cross or stone. The top of the stone has three coiled snakes wrapped around each other at one end, with a design consisting of twelve bosses in the middle and two sea-horses facing each other at the lower end. The left and right borders are marked with interlace patterns that end in birds' heads at one end, at the other end animal jaws open to frame a hollow slot. The sides of the monument are also decorated; one has a hunting scene and a griffin. The opposite side has depictions of a corpse being consumed by two beasts, four interlaced naked human figures and a further two beasts. The end of the stone is carved with a manticore and a human figure.

Meigle 27 is a piece from a cross slab and depicts a figure sitting in a chair, with his servant sat on the floor behind him.

Meigle 28 is the bottom piece of a broken cross slab, it has a horizontal base panel filled with a spiral pattern, and two vertical panels filled with a diagonal key pattern.

Meigle 29 is a fragment depicting two clerics, one of whom appears to be sitting on a chair. The more complete of the two figures has two shoulder brooches holding the folds of his clothing.

Meigle 30 is a fragment carved with a coiled beast.

Meigle 31 is the upper portion of a cross slab, with interlace pattern flanking the head of the cross.

Meigle 32 is a fragment from a cross slab, containing the left arm of the cross and part of a panel containing spiral patterns.

Meigle 33 is a fragment of sculpture with a circular pattern. It is of later date than the rest of the stones in the museum.

Meigle 34 is a carved fragment with a scroll engraved on it.

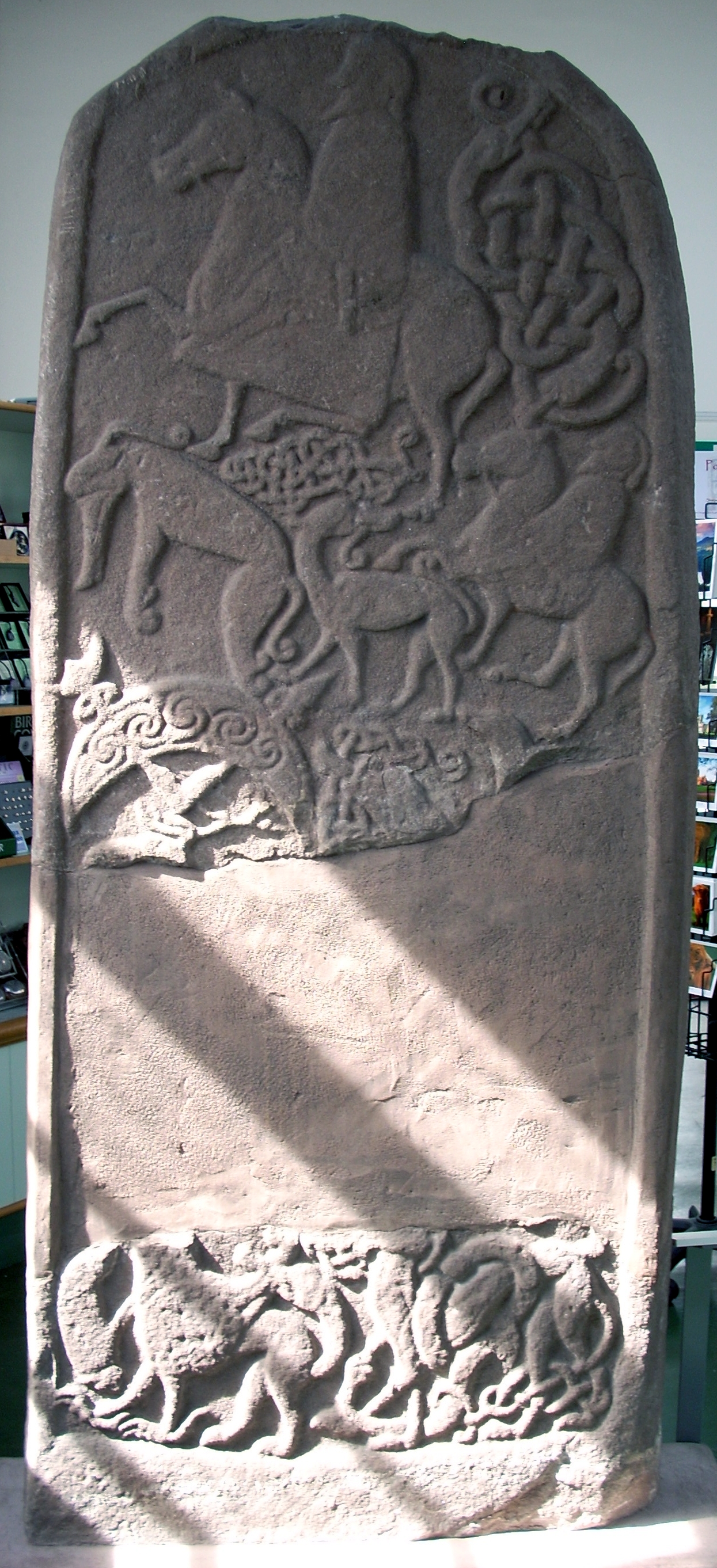
The fragmented back of Meigle 4.

== See also ==
- Eassie Stone
- Kilry Glen
