= Conan Stone =

9th century Pictish stone

Conon Bridge

The Conan Stone is a 9th century Pictish stone made of Old Red Sandstone measuring 1.69 x 0.64 x 0.195 metres. It was discovered in 2019 in an Early Christian church and burial site near Conon Bridge, Easter Ross, Scotland. The stone was excavated later that year with funds raised by the North of Scotland Archaeological Society (NOSAS) and the Pictish Arts Society (PAS). Since December 2020, it has been displayed in the window of Dingwall Museum.

== Description ==
The Conan Stone is decorated in relief on all four sides and can be categorised as a Class II monument according to Joseph Anderson's classifications in The Early Christian Monuments of Scotland (ECMS).

=== Obverse face ===
The obverse face of the Conan Stone features a large shafted Christian cross with hollow angles which spans the full width of the face and the majority of its length. The front of the stone is the most weathered face as, having been laid face-down, this portion of the stone was subjected to many years of cyclical wetting and drying. However, panels of decorative interlace and entangled zoomorphic creatures are still visible around the cross. For example, in the lower left-hand side under the left arm of the cross, an entangled beast appears to bite its own tail. Although now badly weathered, the central roundel and arms of the cross itself were likely once filled with intricate peltas and spirals.

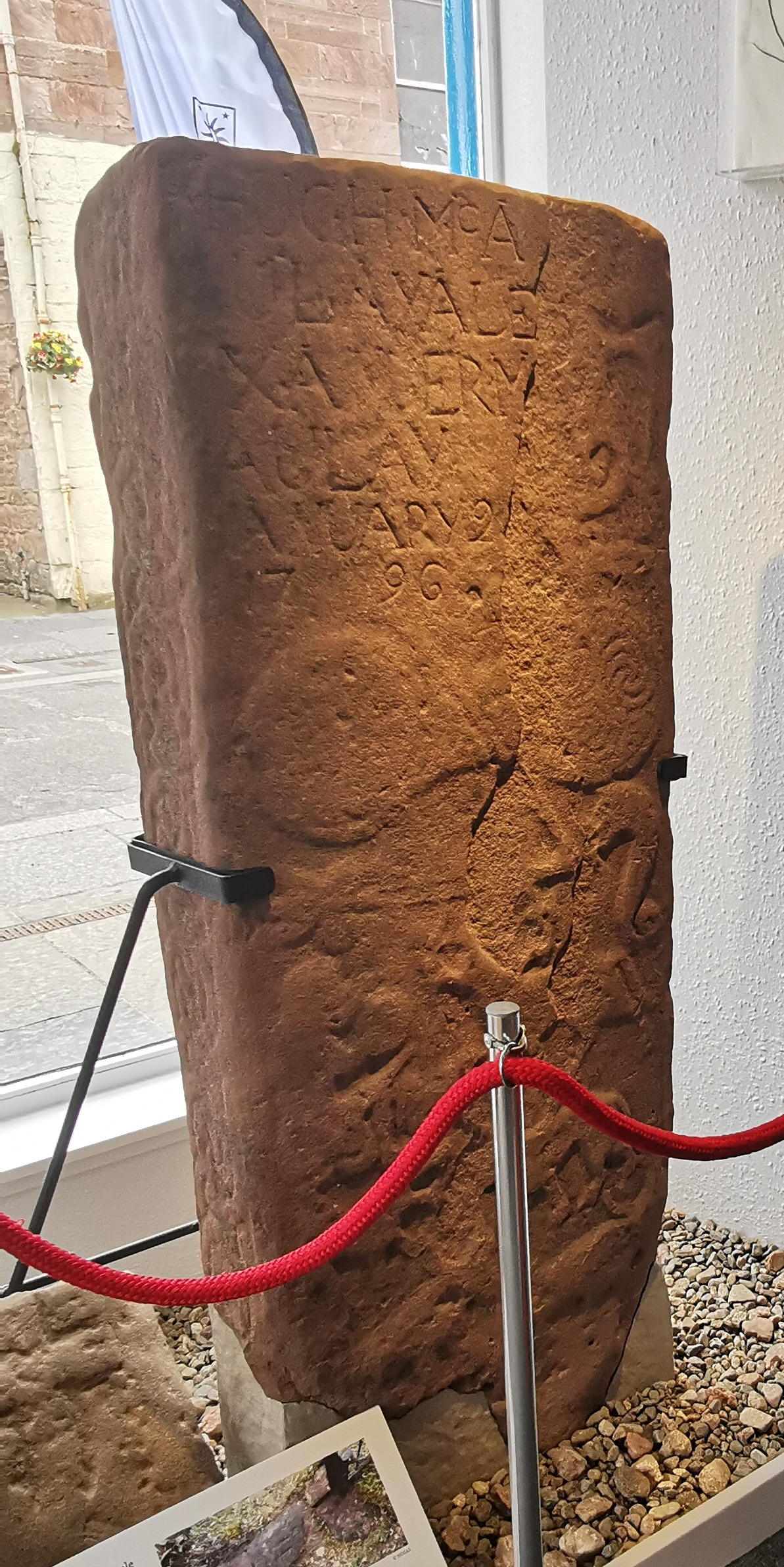
Image showing the reverse of the Conan Stone at Dingwall Museum.

Above the cross lies a narrow upper section which depicts the confronting heads of two fanged beasts. Paired beasts such as these frequently frame the top of Pictish cross-slabs and are usually identified as hybrid sea creatures. However, the animals at the top of the Conan stone are unusual in their large scale and the shape of their heads. Unlike the majority of other such examples on Pictish cross-slabs, the Conan beasts have anatomically specific teeth – they have molars, canines and incisors – and feature dangling interlace from their mouths, perhaps representing their tongues or snakes.

=== Reverse face ===
The reverse face of the Conan Stone depicts a range of different real and mythical creatures. In the upper left corner, approximately one fifth of the surface has been deliberately chipped away and re-inscribed with the names Hugh McAulay and Alexander McAulay, together with the date January 2 1796. This Pre-Reformation inscription obscures what may once have been a full-width serpent and Z-rod Pictish symbol, the floriated terminals of which are still visible as is the double disc and Z-shaped symbol below. To the side sits a small S-shaped figure matching the hippocampus (symbol no.159) in ECMS.

The remaining space is occupied by rows of paired beasts: a kneeling figure with an animal head that often appears on Pictish cross-slabs, and is often termed the ‘formidable man’, faces a now headless centaur with two axes and a small cauldron-like object stands between them. Below, a pair of quadrupeds also face each other and two oxen with large U-shaped horns face rightwards.

=== Narrow faces ===
Interlace appears on both the narrow east and west faces of the stone. On the west face, the interlace terminates just beyond the half way point to give way to an angular key pattern.

== Conservation ==
In August 2019, the stone was excavated clear of soil by archaeologist Kirsty Cameron and members of NOSAS. The following day, two conservators, assisted by members of NOSAS, lifted the stone from the ground using a gantry, block and tackle. The stone was then transported to a van 250m away using a soft-wheeled bogie.

A team of nine conservators from Graciela Ainsworth Sculpture Conservation then worked on the stone. As the stone had lain in the wet ground for many years and was to be displayed in the dry environment of Dingwall Museum, it was necessary to test how the stone would react to a new dry climate and to let it dry out gradually over the course of four months. The drying out process allowed conservators to begin removing dirt, plant roots and other organic matter from the fractures in the stone.

A large fissure ran horizontally between the two faces of the stone, dividing it into two layers, and this had been penetrated by plant roots which had widened the crack enough that conservators found soil, moisture and insects in it. A large machine was used to open the stone to clear out the remaining organic matter. The two layers of the stone were fixed back together using stainless steel threaded dowels set in resin while the remaining laminations were filled with an acrylic co-polymer resin matched to the texture and colour of the stone using pigments and fine sands. An epoxy resin shoe in the form of a section of the missing stone was made for the base to support the two layers of the stone and ensure the stone’s stability and suitability for vertical display in the public space of Dingwall Museum.
