= Seven Children of Cruithne =

Pictish origin myth in Old Irish

Seven Children of Cruithne (Old Irish: Mórseiser do Chruithne claind) is a quatrain written in Old Irish that forms the earliest known record of one of the origin myths of the Picts. In this myth, the Pictish kingdom's legendary founder Cruithne divides his territory into seven districts for each of his seven sons, each of which succeed him sequentially in ruling the entire kingdom.

== Background ==
The verse is written in Old Irish and has four lines, each of seven syllables, grouped into two rhyming pairs.

It exists as part of a detached section of the Lebor Bretnach called "Concerning Pictish Origins" (Old Irish: Do Bunad Cruithnech) that was added to the main text at the same time as the related list of Pictish Kings was extended forward to include Causantín son of Cinaed, and backward to include the mythical Cruithne and his seven sons described in the poem. It was therefore probably added to the text during Causantín's reign between 862 and 876, and probably dates as a verse from a short time before 850.

The mid 9th century was a period when the Picts were repeatedly raided by Vikings, weakening royal power and threatening the very concept of Pictish overkingship through its failure to provide protection. Seven Children of Cruithne is probably intended to emphasise an image of a single Pictish kingdom, uniting its various districts in a single primordial territory stretching from the Firth of Forth to the Pentland Firth.

== Interpretation ==
The quatrain has been widely discussed by historians as providing a representation of Pictish geography. Giving territories mythical eponymous founders was a common literary practice throughout the classical and medieval periods, and several of the names of Cruithne's sons clearly relate to known regions within the territory of the Picts. Fib is recognisable as Fife. Fotla as the second element of Ath Fhotla or Atholl. Fortrenn is the genitive form of Fortriu, the best attested Pictish territory, now known to have been located in the area of later Moray and Ross. Cait survives in Caithness; as Cataibh, the modern Scottish Gaelic name for Sutherland, and as Innse Catt, the medieval Gaelic name for the Shetland Isles. Ce refers to the territory of Cé, which is independently attested in three Irish sagas and in the name of the mountain Bennachie (Old Irish: Beinn Cé, lit. 'Mountain of Cé'), and so was probably located in the area of modern-day Aberdeenshire. Cirig is usually associated with the territory of Circin, which may have encompassed The Mearns or Strathearn or both. The only one of Cruithne's seven legendary sons that does not appear independently in any records is Fidach, a name which just means "woody" which was tentatively associated by William J. Watson with Glen Fiddich, an area which may however have been part of Fortriu.

This quatrain is also probably the earliest use of the word "Alba" with reference to the area that would become known as the Kingdom of Alba in Gaelic chronicles from 900. The use of the Gaelic term Alba to describe the territory north the Forth has often been seen as marking the replacement of a Pictish identity with a Gaelic one. In Seven Children of Cruithne, however, the word Alba is clearly referring to Pictland, and far from denoting the demise of Pictish identity, is closely associated with its assertion.

== Text ==
=== Gaelic ===
Mórseiser do Cruithne claind
Raindset Albain i seacht raind
Cait Ce Círig cetach clann
Fíb Fidach Fotla Fortrenn

=== English translation ===
Seven of Cruithne’s offspring
Divided Alba into seven shares
Cait, Ce, Círig, children with hundreds,
Fife, Fidach, Fotla, Fortriu.

== Bibliography ==
- Broun, Dauvit (2007). Scottish Independence and the Idea of Britain From the Picts to Alexander III. Edinburgh: Edinburgh University Press. ISBN 9780748623617.
- Evans, Nicholas (2013). "Circin and Mag Gerginn: Pictish Territories in Irish and Scottish Sources". Cambrian Medieval Celtic Studies. 66: 1–36.
- Evans, Nicholas (2019). "A historical introduction to the northern Picts". In Noble, Gordon; Evans, Nicholas (eds.). The King in the North: The Pictish realms of Fortriu and Ce. Collected essays written as part of the University of Aberdeen's Northern Picts project. Edinburgh: Birlinn. pp. 10–38. ISBN 9781780275512.
- Fraser, James (2009). From Caledonia to Pictland: Scotland to 795. Edinburgh: Edinburgh University Press. ISBN 9780748612321.
- Woolf, Alex (2007). From Pictland to Alba 789–1070. Edinburgh: Edinburgh University Press. ISBN 9780748612345.
