= Picts in literature and popular culture =

The Picts, the pre-Gaelic people of eastern Scotland, have frequently been represented in literature and popular culture.

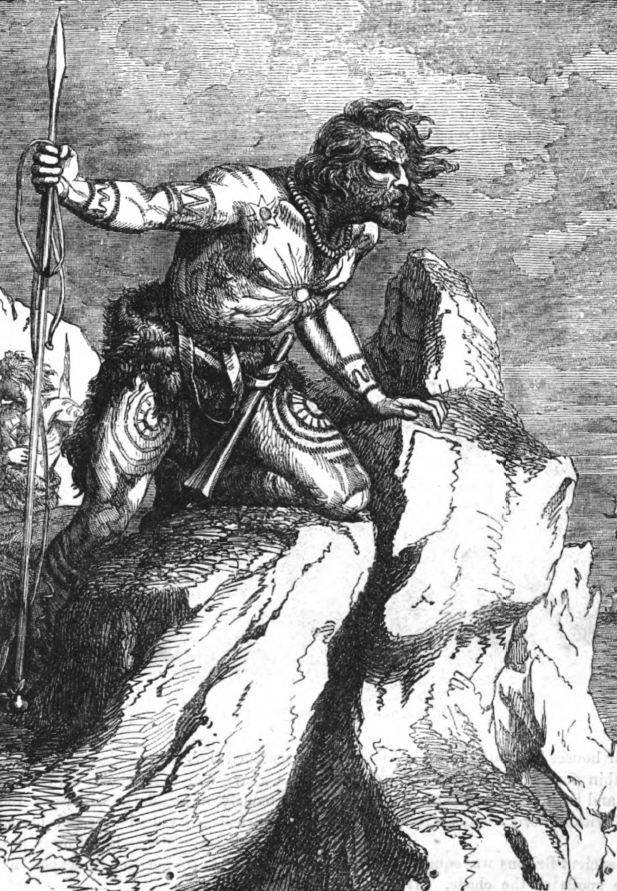
A Caledonian or Pict, as represented in a 19th-century history book

== Visual arts ==
Thematic Pictish history and imagery has been appropriated by multiple contemporary fine artists, most notably American ex-pat Marianna Lines, British artists Lisa Wright and Jon Hodgson, as well as American artist F. Lennox Campello.

== Fairies and Picts ==
David MacRitchie was an outspoken proponent of the euhemeristic origin of fairies being the folk memory of Picts. He argued they were rooted in a real diminutive or pygmy-statured indigenous population that lived during the late Stone Age across the British Isles, especially Scotland:

"Postulations based on the premise that fairies constitute a folk memory of former races, conquered peoples who were pushed out beyond the periphery of settled areas, have fuelled the imagination of many scholars on this subject. Of particular significance was a theory advanced by David MacRitchie that fairies were an actual race of small or 'little' people, the original Pict[ish] peoples of Scotland."

MacRitchie developed what became known as the "Pygmy-Pict theory" in his The Testimony of Tradition (1890) and Fians, Fairies and Picts (1893) regarding fairies to have been folk memories of the aboriginal Picts who in his view were of very small size, pointing to findings of short doors (3 – 4 ft in height) of chambers, underground dwellings, long barrows, as well as quoting old literature such as Adam of Bremen's Historia Norwegiæ which describe the Picts of Orkney as "only a little exceeding pygmies in stature". The folklorist John Francis Campbell, who MacRitchie cited, had also written in his Popular Tales of the West Highlands (1860–62):

"I believe there once was a small race of people in these islands, who are remembered as fairies [...] the fairy was probably a Pict."

Robert Louis Stevenson described so the Picts in his Heather Ale poem:

Rudely plucked from their hiding,
Never a word they spoke:
A son and his aged father—
Last of the dwarfish folk.

Modern archaeological studies demonstrate that the Picts were not significantly different in height from the present-day occupants of Scotland.

== Examples ==
Pulp fiction author Robert E. Howard wrote extensively about his romanticized version of the Picts, especially in his short stories revolving around the fictional character Bran Mak Morn, but also in many other of his stories. In his Conan the Barbarian series, the Picts are described as very similar in culture to the indigenous peoples of the Northeastern Woodlands, especially the Iroquois or Wyandot.

== Bibliography ==
Henderson, L.; Cowan, E. J. (2001), Scottish Fairy Belief: A History, East Linton: Tuckwell Press, ISBN 1862321906
