= Atholl =

Historical division in the Scottish Highlands

Coordinates: 56.704°N 3.794°W

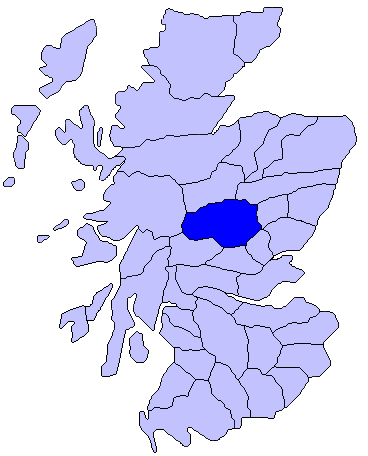
Map of Scotland showing roughly the district of Atholl

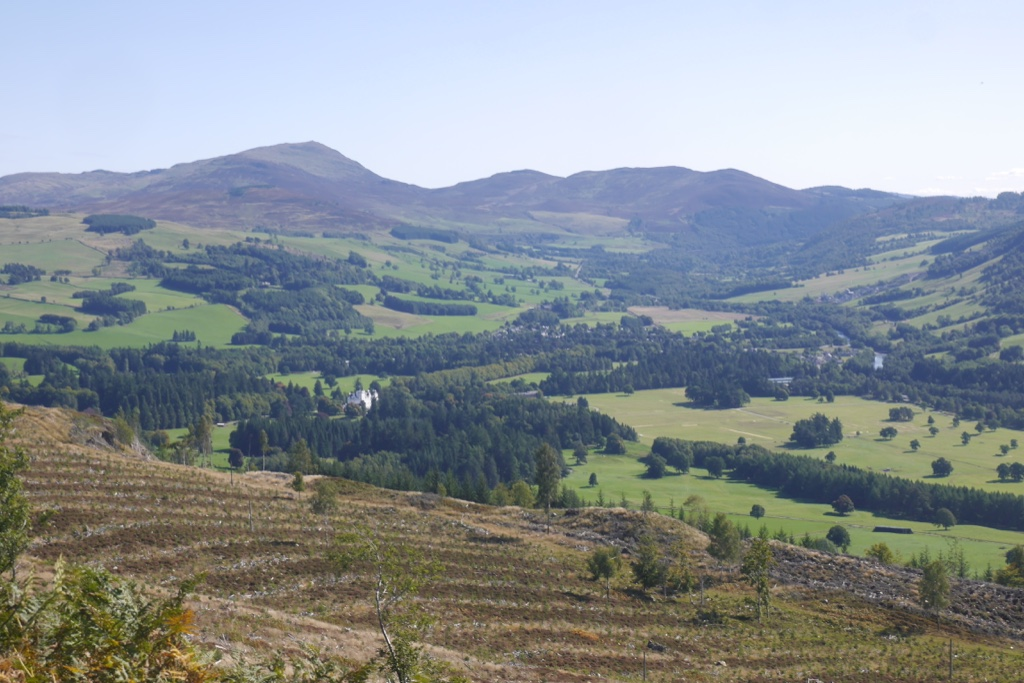
Aerial view of Blair Atholl (Gaelic Blàr Athall, "the plain of Atholl")

Atholl or Athole (Scottish Gaelic: Athall) is a district in the heart of the Scottish Highlands, bordering (in clockwise order, from north-east) Marr, Gowrie, Perth, Strathearn, Breadalbane, Lochaber, and Badenoch. Historically it was a Pictish kingdom, becoming one of the original provinces of the Kingdom of Alba before being incorporated into the sheriffdom and later county of Perthshire. Today it forms the northern part of Perth and Kinross, Scotland.

== Etymology ==
In Scottish Gaelic the name is Athall, which traditionally has been interpreted as deriving from the Old Irish Ath-fhotla, or "New Ireland" (Fotla being a traditional name for Ireland). The explanation given for this relates to the Gaelic settlement of Scotland, which was previously inhabited by the Picts.

James E. Fraser has called the "New Ireland" interpretation into question. On the basis of the early spelling Athochlach, the first element has been proposed as representing ath, meaning "ford, way through'" and the second fochla, "north", thus giving a full meaning "way to the north" (exactly as in the English name for Norway). Ath-fochla may have represented a Gaelic equivalent of a Pictish name (cf. Welsh Ad[wy] Gogledd).

== History ==
=== Pictish kingdom ===
The first documented record of Atholl is an 8th-century mention in the Annals of Ulster, but three placenames in Atholl – the town of Dunkeld and the mountains Schiehallion and Rohallion – preserve the name of the Caledonians, a tribe or tribal confederation recorded by Roman writers including Tacitus and Cassius Dio.

Atholl is listed in the 9th century poem Seven Children of Cruithne and the longer Pictish King Lists as one of the seven Pictish territories founded by eponymous children of the mythical Pictish founder Cruithne son of Cinge. Atholl is the only one of these territories, apart from the dominant northern kingdom of Fortriu, to be historically documented as having its own king. The Northumbrian Bede, writing in the early 8th century, described how the Picts were divided by the Mounth and the Grampian Mountains into northern and southern groupings, with the southern Picts having their "seats among the mountains". It is therefore possible that Atholl was the dominant royal region of the southern Picts, as Fortriu was in the north, before coming firmly under the grip of Fortriu during the 8th century Verturian Hegemony.

=== Province and earldom ===
Atholl emerged as one of the core provinces of the early Kingdom of Alba. The first known Mormaer of Atholl was Dubdon of Atholl, recorded in the Chronicle of the Kings of Alba as having been killed during the battle between King Dub and his challenger Cuilén at Dorsum Crup in 965.

The first recorded Earl of Atholl was Matad, Earl of Atholl sometime in the 12th century. In 1703 the title was made a Dukedom by Queen Anne. The title also holds numerous subsidiary titles. These include: Marquess of Atholl (created 1676), Marquess of Tullibardine (1703), Earl of Atholl (1629), Earl of Tullibardine (1606 and 1676), Earl of Strathtay and Strathardle (1703), Viscount of Balquhidder (1676), Lord Murray of Tullibardine (1604), Lord Murray, Balvenie and Gask (1676) and Baron Percy (1722). The Barony of Percy forms part of the peerage of Great Britain; all other titles belong in the peerage of Scotland.

The right of the Earls of Atholl to hold courts for the area were ended in 1746 by the Heritable Jurisdictions Act, and the province was subsequently only subject to the jurisdiction of the sheriff of Perth. In the mid 19th century, local government reforms replaced the ancient provinces by new Counties (shires), aligned to sheriffdom boundaries; hence, Atholl formed the northern portion of the new Perthshire.

Towns and villages in Atholl include Aberfeldy, Ballinluig, Blair Atholl, Dunkeld, Kirkmichael, Logierait, Pitlochry and Weem.

== Notable residents ==
- John Small (British Army officer)
- Alexander Mackenzie, born at Logierait in 1822, politician and second Prime Minister of Canada.

== See also ==
- Blair Atholl
- Duke of Atholl
- Earl of Atholl
- Vale of Atholl Pipe Band
- MacGillonie
- Atolovo, a Bulgarian village named after a Duke of Atholl
- Medieval Diocese of Dunkeld
- Athol, Idaho
- Athol, Massachusetts

== Bibliography ==
- Broun, Dauvit (2007). Scottish Independence and the Idea of Britain From the Picts to Alexander III. Edinburgh: Edinburgh University Press. ISBN 9780748623617.
- Fraser, James E (19 January 2009). From Caledonia to Pictland: Scotland to 795. Edinburgh: Edinburgh University Press. ISBN 9780748628209.
- MacQueen, Hector L. (2008). "Scotland: Politics, Government and Law". In Rigby, S. H. (ed.). A Companion to Britain in the Later Middle Ages. Chichester: John Wiley & Sons. pp. 283–308. ISBN 0470998776.
- Woolf, Alex (2007). From Pictland to Alba 789–1070. Edinburgh: Edinburgh University Press. ISBN 9780748612345.
