= MacGillonie =

MacGillonie or MacGill'Eoinidh, according to MacIntosh was a famous hunter in the Grampian Mountains, Scotland and several vestiges of his huts were seen in the mountains of Atholl in 1785. The MacGillonies belonged to Clan Cameron, but were originally allied to the MacLeans.

An old proverb states:

Is mairg don sguaban-stòthaidh bò mhaol odhar MhicGhill'Eoinidh
(Pity the one whose store is the hornless brown cow of MacGillonie)

MacGillonie's "brown cow" was the wild mountain doe.
