= Circin =

Pictish territory in modern-day Scotland

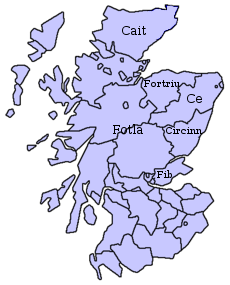
The approximate location of Circin in Scotland.

Circin was a Pictish territory recorded in contemporary sources between the 6th and 9th centuries, located north of the Firth of Tay and south of the Grampian Mountains within modern-day Scotland. It is associated with the nominative plural form Cirig, the name of one of the mythical founders of Pictish territories mentioned in the 9th century origin myth of the Picts Seven Children of Cruithne.

Circin is the second most commonly attested Pictish territory in contemporary historical sources, after the dominant kingdom of Fortriu, but is not itself described in any source as a kingdom.

== Bibliography ==
- Broun, Dauvit (2007). Scottish Independence and the Idea of Britain From the Picts to Alexander III. Edinburgh: Edinburgh University Press. ISBN 9780748623617.
- Evans, Nicholas (2013). "Circin and Mag Gerginn: Pictish Territories in Irish and Scottish Sources". Cambrian Medieval Celtic Studies. 66: 1–36.
