= Picts =

Medieval tribal confederation in northern Britain

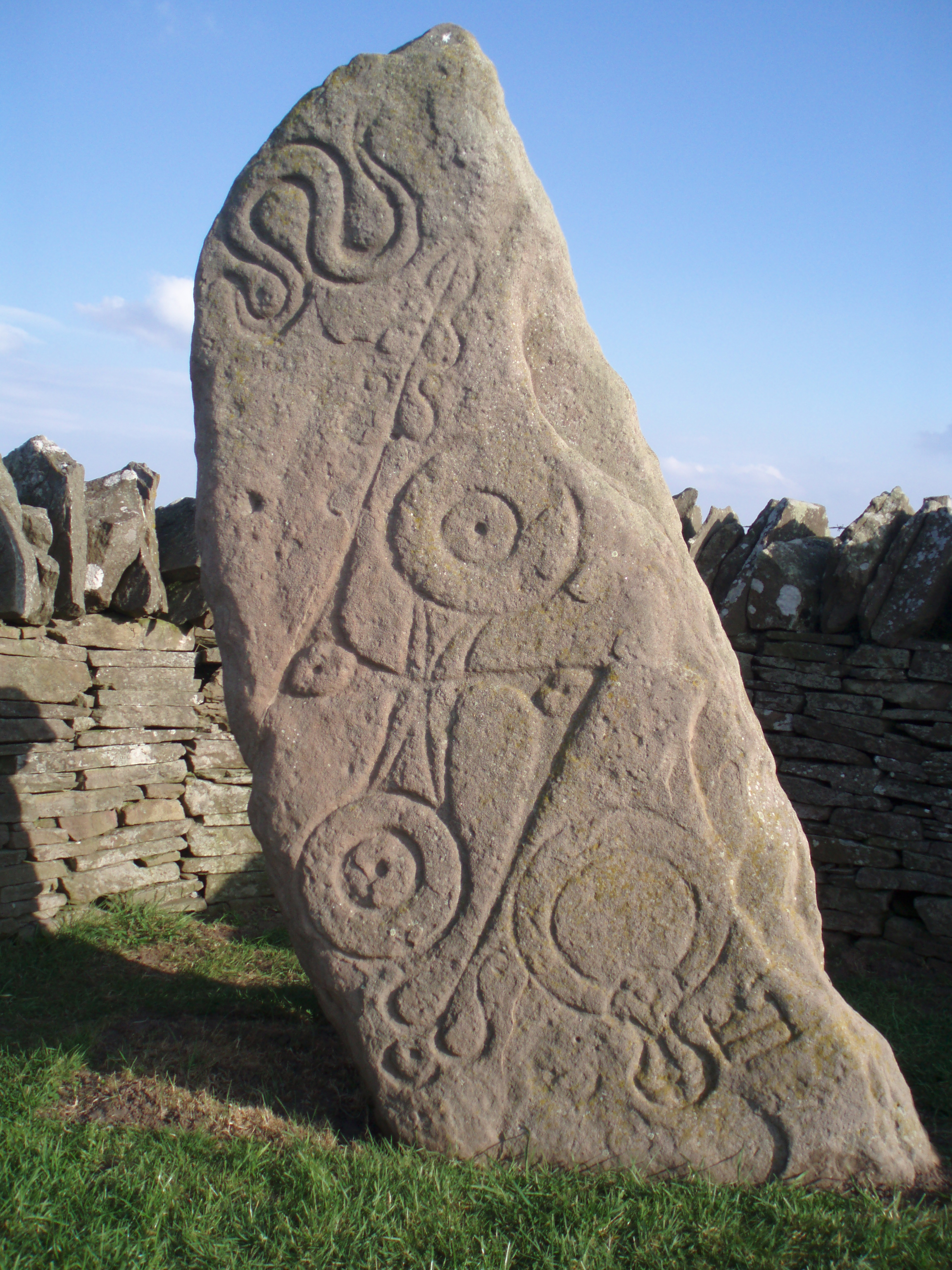
The Aberlemno I roadside symbol stone, Class I Pictish stone with Pictish symbols, showing (top to bottom) the serpent, the double disc and Z-rod and the mirror and comb

The Picts were a group of peoples in what is now Scotland north of the Firth of Forth, in the Early Middle Ages. Where they lived and details of their culture can be gleaned from early medieval texts and Pictish stones. The name Picti appears in written records as an exonym from the late third century AD. They are assumed to have been descendants of the Caledonii and other northern Iron Age tribes.

Their territory is referred to as "Pictland" by modern historians. Initially made up of several chiefdoms, it came to be dominated by the Pictish kingdom of Fortriu from the seventh century. During this Verturian hegemony, Picti was adopted as an endonym. This lasted around 160 years until the Pictish kingdom merged with that of Dál Riata to form the Kingdom of Alba, ruled by the House of Alpin. The concept of "Pictish kingship" continued for a few decades until it was abandoned during the reign of Caustantín mac Áeda.

Pictish society was typical of many early medieval societies in northern Europe and had parallels with neighbouring groups. Archaeology gives some impression of their culture. Medieval sources report the existence of a Pictish language, and evidence shows that it was an Insular Celtic language related to the Brittonic spoken by the Celtic Britons to the south. Pictish was gradually displaced by Middle Gaelic as part of the wider Gaelicisation from the late ninth century. Much of their history is known from outside sources, including Bede, hagiographies of saints such as that of Columba by Adomnán, and the Irish annals.

== Definitions ==
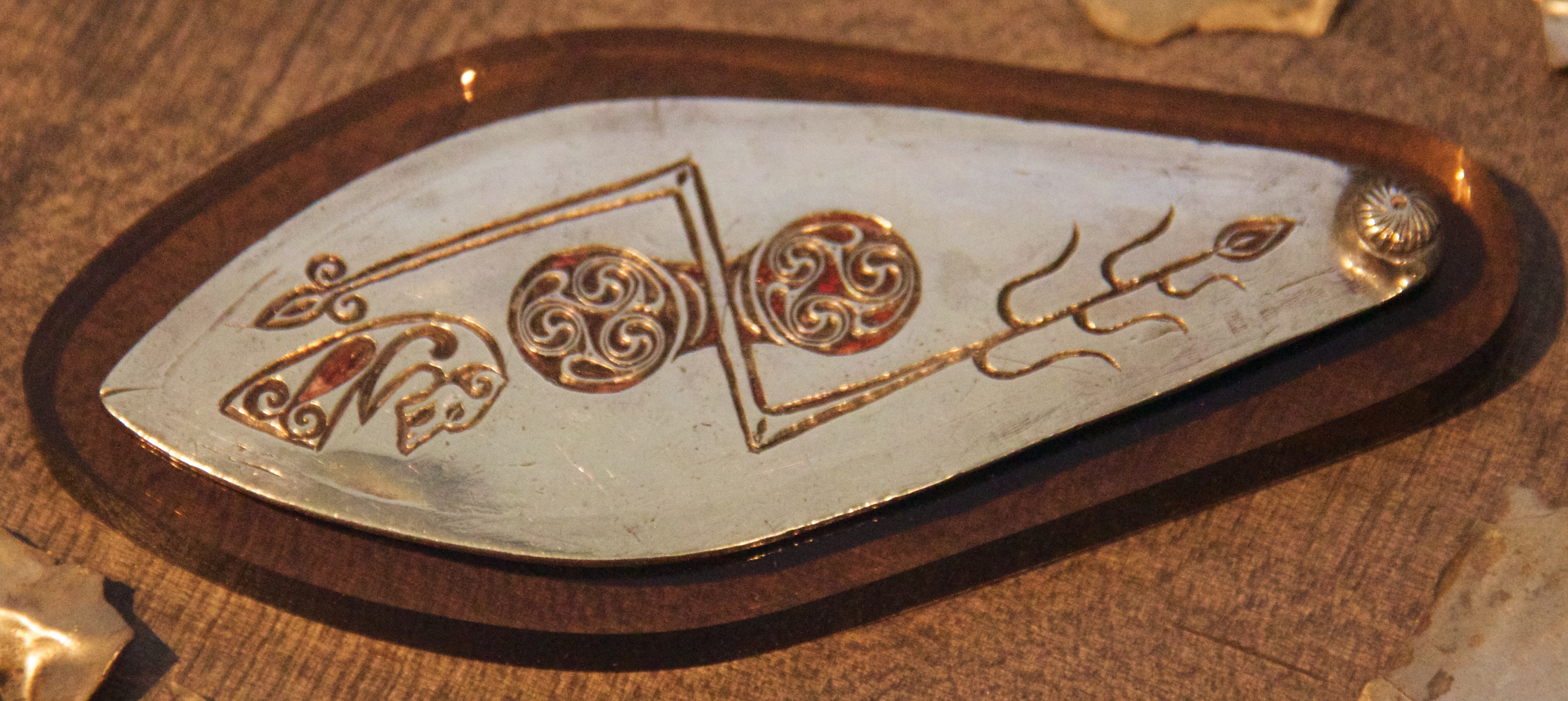
Silver plaque from the Norrie's Law hoard, Fife, with double disc and Z-rod symbol

There has been substantial critical reappraisal of the concept of "Pictishness" over recent decades. The popular view at the beginning of the twentieth century was that they were exotic "lost people". It was noted in the highly influential work of 1955, The Problem of the Picts, that the subject area was difficult, with the archaeological and historical records frequently being at odds with the conventional essentialist expectations about historical peoples. Since then, the culture-historical paradigm of archaeology dominant since the late nineteenth century gave way to the processual archaeology (formerly known as the New Archaeology) theory. Moreover, there has been significant reappraisal of textual sources written, for example by Bede and Adomnán in the seventh and eighth centuries. These works relate events of previous centuries, but current scholarship recognises their often allegorical, pseudo-historical nature, and their true value often lies in an appraisal of the time period in which they were written.

The difficulties with Pictish history and archaeology arise from the fact that the people who were called Picts were a fundamentally heterogeneous group with little cultural uniformity. Care is needed to avoid viewing them through the lens of what the cultural historian Gilbert Márkus calls the "Ethnic Fallacy". The people known as "Picts" by outsiders in late antiquity were very different from those who later adopted the name, in terms of language, culture, religion and politics.

The term "Pict" is found in Roman sources from the end of the third century AD, when it was used to describe unromanised people in northern Britain. The term is most likely to have been pejorative, emphasising their supposed barbarism in contrast to the Britons under Roman rule. It has been argued, most notably by James Fraser, that the term "Pict" would have had little meaning to the people to whom it was being applied. Fraser posits that it was adopted as an endonym only in the late seventh century, as an inclusive term for people under rule of the Verturian hegemony, centered in Fortriu (the area around modern-day Inverness and Moray), particularly following the Battle of Dun Nechtain. This view is, however, not universal. Gordon Noble and Nicholas Evans consider it plausible, if not provable, that "Picts" may have been used as an endonym by those northern Britons in closest contact with Rome as early as the fourth century.

The bulk of written history dates from the seventh century onwards. The Irish annalists and contemporary scholars, like Bede, use "Picts" to describe the peoples under the Verturian hegemony. This encompassed most of Scotland north of the Forth-Clyde isthmus and to the exclusion of territory occupied by Dál Riata in the west. To the south lay the Brittonic kingdom of Strathclyde, with Lothian occupied by Northumbrian Angles. The use of "Picts" as a descriptive term continued to the formation of the Alpínid dynasty in the ninth century, and the merging of the Pictish Kingdom with that of Dál Riata.

== Etymology ==
The Latin word Picti first occurs in a panegyric, a formal eulogising speech from 297, and is most commonly explained as meaning 'painted' (from Latin pingere 'to paint'; pictus, 'painted', cf. Greek πυκτίς pyktis, 'picture'). This is generally understood to be a reference to the practice of tattooing. Claudian, in his account of the Roman commander Stilicho, written around 404, speaks of designs on the bodies of dying Picts, presumably referring to tattoos or body paint. Isidore of Seville reports in the early seventh century that the practice was continued by the Picts. An alternative suggestion is that the Latin Picti was derived from a native form, perhaps related etymologically to the Gallic Pictones.

The Picts were called Cruithni in Old Irish and Prydyn in Old Welsh. These are lexical cognates, from the proto-Celtic *kwritu 'form', from which *Pretania (Britain) also derives. Pretani (and with it Cruithni and Prydyn) is likely to have originated as a generalised term for any native inhabitant of Britain. This is similar to the situation with the Gaelic name of Scotland, Alba, which originally seems to have been a generalised term for Britain. It has been proposed that the Picts may have called themselves Albidosi, possibly deriving from Pictish, a name found in the Chronicle of the Kings of Alba (in Latin language) during the reign of Máel Coluim mac Domnaill together with an obscure term Nainndisi.

== Origins ==
Pictland and neighbouring territories, c. early 8th century AD.

The origin myth presented in Bede's Ecclesiastical History of the English People describes the Picts as settlers from Scythia who arrived on the northern coast of Ireland by chance. Local Scoti leaders redirected them to northern Britain where they settled, taking Scoti wives. The Pictish Chronicle, repeating this story, further names the mythical founding leader Cruithne (the Gaelic word for Pict), followed by his sons, whose names correspond with the seven provinces of Pictland: Circin, Fidach, Fortriu, Fotla (Atholl), Cat, Ce and Fib. Bede's account has long been recognised as pseudohistorical literary invention, and is thought to be of Pictish origin, composed around 700. Its structure is similar to the origin myths of other peoples and its main purpose appears to have been to legitimise the annexation of Pictish territories by Fortriu and the creation of a wider Pictland.

A study published in 2023 sequenced the whole genomes from eight individuals associated with the Pictish period, excavated from cemeteries at Lundin Links in Fife and Balintore, Easter Ross. The study observed "broad affinities" between the mainland Pictish genomes, Iron Age Britons and the present-day people living in western Scotland, Wales, Northern Ireland and Northumbria, but less with the rest of England, supporting the current archaeological theories of a "local origin" of the Pictish people.

== History ==
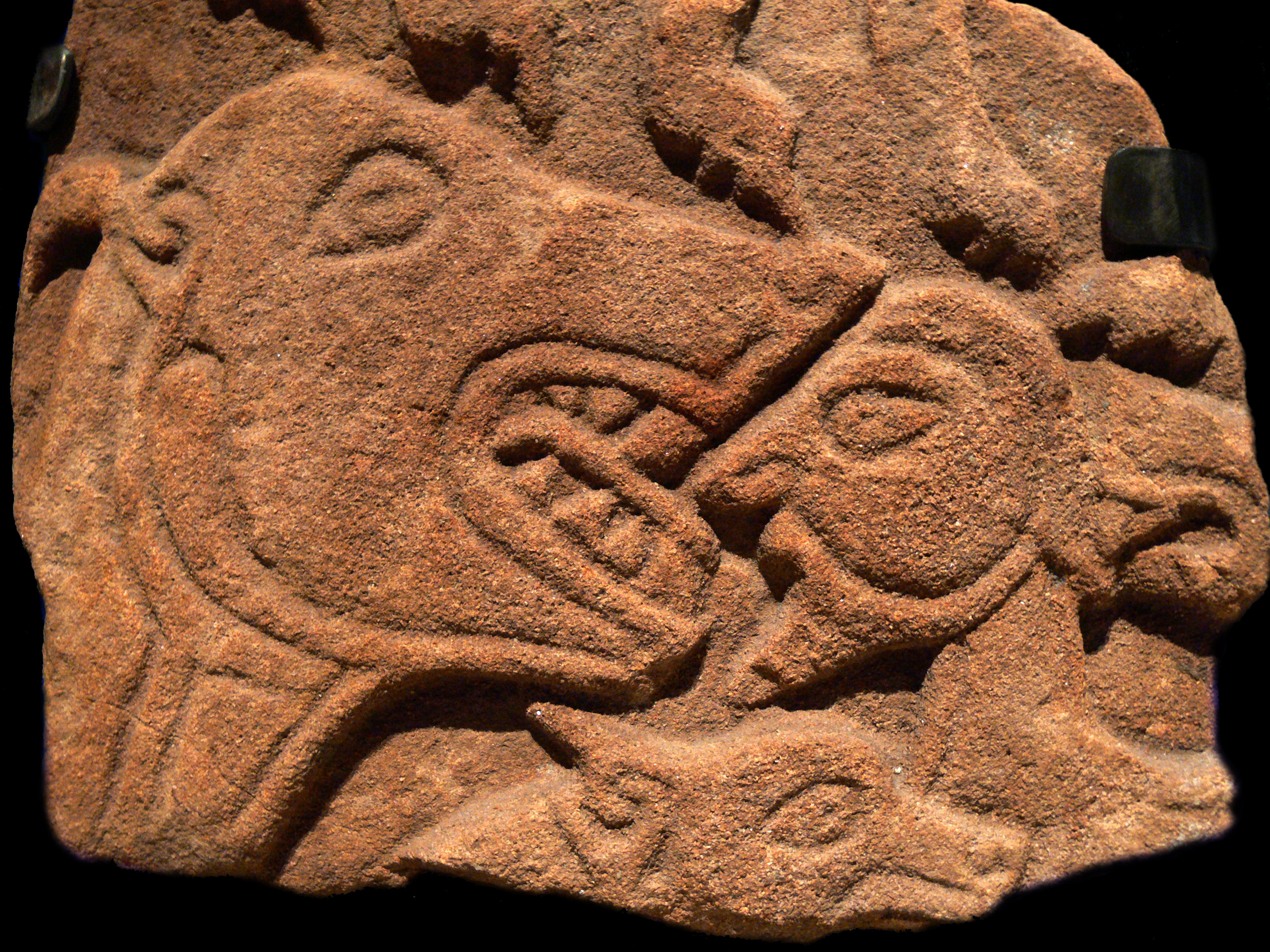
The so-called Daniel Stone, cross slab fragment found at Rosemarkie, Easter Ross

The area occupied by the Picts had previously been described by Roman writers and geographers as the home of the Caledonii. These Romans also used other names to refer to Britannic tribes living in the area, including Verturiones, Taexali and Venicones.

Written history relating to the Picts as a people emerges in the Early Middle Ages. At that time, the Gaels of Dál Riata controlled what is now Argyll, as part of a kingdom straddling the sea between Britain and Ireland. The Angles of Bernicia, which merged with Deira to form Northumbria, overwhelmed the adjacent British kingdoms, and for much of the 7th century Northumbria was the most powerful kingdom in Britain. The Picts were probably tributary to Northumbria until the reign of Bridei mac Beli, when, in 685, the Anglians suffered a defeat at the Battle of Dun Nechtain that halted their northward expansion. The Northumbrians continued to dominate southern Scotland for the remainder of the Pictish period.

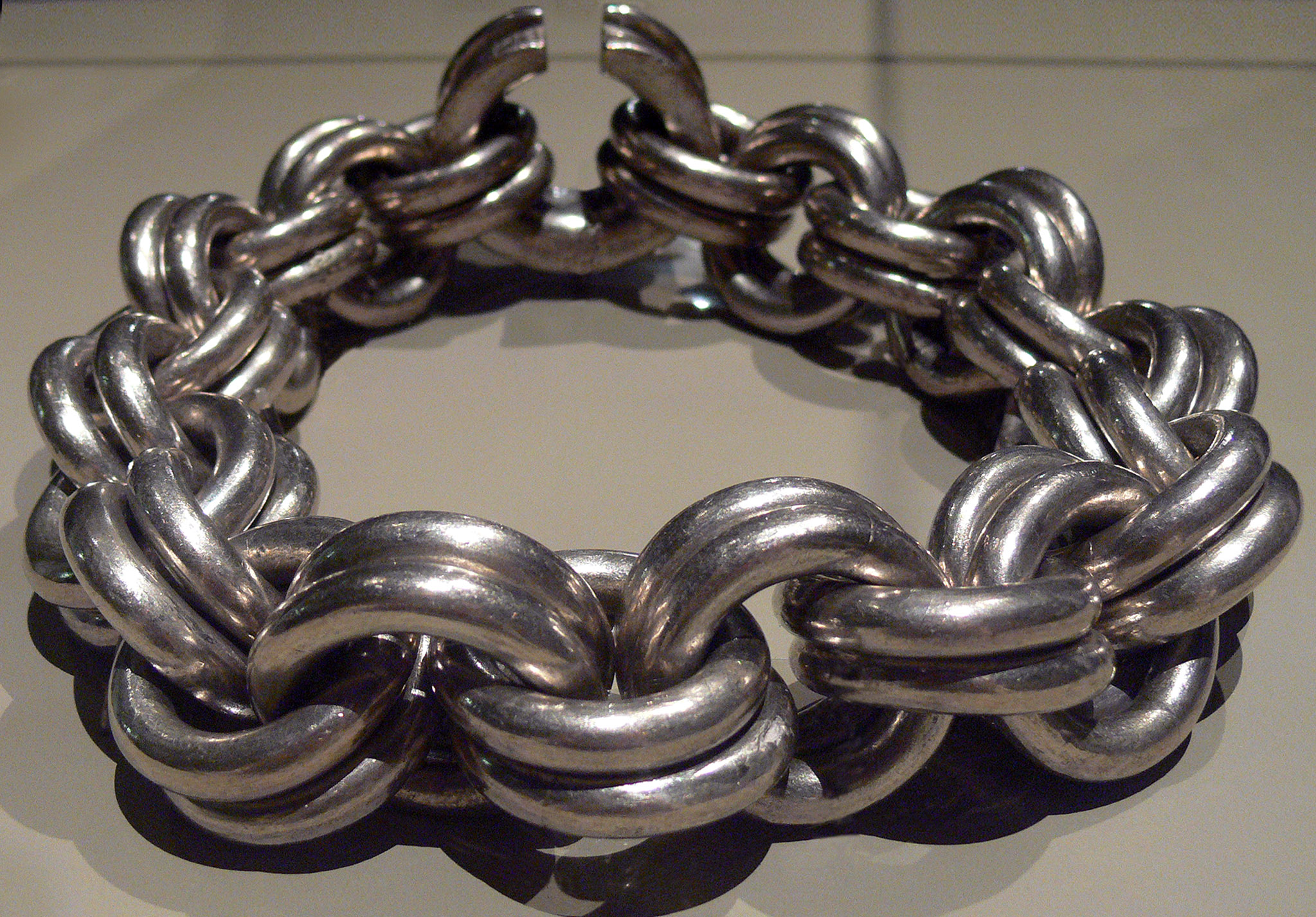
The Whitecleuch Chain, high-status Pictish silver chain, one of ten known to exist, dating from between 400 and 800 AD

Dál Riata was subject to the Pictish king Óengus mac Fergusa (reigned 729–761), and although it had its own kings beginning in the 760s, does not appear to have recovered its political independence from the Picts. A later Pictish king, Caustantín mac Fergusa (793–820), placed his son Domnall on the throne of Dál Riata (811–835). Pictish attempts to achieve a similar dominance over the Britons of Alt Clut (Strathclyde) were not successful.

The Viking Age brought significant change to Britain and Ireland, no less in Scotland than elsewhere, with the Vikings conquering and settling the islands and various mainland areas, including Caithness, Sutherland and Galloway. In the middle of the 9th century Ketil Flatnose is said to have founded the Kingdom of the Isles, governing many of these territories, and by the end of that century the Vikings had destroyed the Kingdom of Northumbria, greatly weakened the Kingdom of Strathclyde, and founded the Kingdom of York. In a major battle in 839, the Vikings killed the King of Fortriu, Eógan mac Óengusa, the King of Dál Riata Áed mac Boanta, and many others. In the aftermath, in the 840s, Kenneth MacAlpin (Medieval Gaelic: Cináed mac Ailpín) became king of the Picts.

During the reign of Cínaed's grandson, Caustantín mac Áeda (900–943), outsiders began to refer to the region as the Kingdom of Alba rather than the Kingdom of the Picts, but it is not known whether this was because a new kingdom was established or Alba was simply a closer approximation of the Pictish name for the Picts. However, though the Pictish language did not disappear suddenly, a process of Gaelicisation (which may have begun generations earlier) was clearly underway during the reigns of Caustantín and his successors.

By a certain point, probably during the 11th century, all the inhabitants of northern Alba had become fully Gaelicised Scots, and Pictish identity was forgotten. Henry of Huntingdon was one of the first (surviving) historians to note this disappearance in the mid-12th century Historia Anglorum. Later, the idea of Picts as a tribe was revived in myth and legend.

== Kings and kingdoms ==
The early history of Pictland is unclear. In later periods, multiple kings ruled over separate kingdoms, with one king, sometimes two, more or less dominating their lesser neighbours. De Situ Albanie, a 13th century document, the Pictish Chronicle, the 11th century Duan Albanach, along with Irish legends, have been used to argue the existence of seven Pictish kingdoms. These are: Cait, or Cat, situated in modern Caithness and Sutherland; Ce, situated in modern Mar and Buchan; Circin, perhaps situated in modern Angus and the Mearns; Fib, the modern Fife; Fidach, location unknown, but possibly near Inverness; Fotla, modern Atholl (Ath-Fotla); and Fortriu, cognate with the Verturiones of the Romans, recently shown to be centred on Moray.

More small kingdoms may have existed. Some evidence suggests that a Pictish kingdom also existed in Orkney. De Situ Albanie is not the most reliable of sources, and the number of kingdoms, one for each of the seven sons of Cruithne, the eponymous founder of the Picts, may well be grounds enough for disbelief. Regardless of the exact number of kingdoms and their names, the Pictish nation was not a united one.

For most of Pictish recorded history, the kingdom of Fortriu appears dominant, so much so that king of Fortriu and king of the Picts may mean one and the same thing in the annals. This was previously thought to lie in the area around Perth and southern Strathearn; however, recent work has convinced those working in the field that Moray (a name referring to a very much larger area in the High Middle Ages than the county of Moray) was the core of Fortriu.

The Picts are often thought to have practised matrilineal kingship succession on the basis of Irish legends and a statement in Bede's history. The kings of the Picts when Bede was writing were Bridei and Nechtan, sons of Der Ilei, who indeed claimed the throne through their mother Der Ilei, daughter of an earlier Pictish king.

In Ireland, kings were expected to come from among those who had a great-grandfather who had been king. Kingly fathers were not frequently succeeded by their sons, not because the Picts practised matrilineal succession, but because they were usually followed by their own brothers or cousins (agnatic seniority), more likely to be experienced men with the authority and the support necessary to be king. This was similar to tanistry.

The only woman ruler, mentioned in early Scottish history, is the Pictish Queen in 617, who summoned pirates to massacre Donnán and his companions on the island of Eigg.

The nature of kingship changed considerably during the centuries of Pictish history. While earlier kings had to be successful war leaders to maintain their authority, kingship became rather less personalised and more institutionalised during this time. Bureaucratic kingship was still far in the future when Pictland became Alba, but the support of the church, and the apparent ability of a small number of families to control the kingship for much of the period from the later 7th century onwards, provided a considerable degree of continuity. In much the same period, the Picts' neighbours in Dál Riata and Northumbria faced considerable difficulties, as the stability of succession and rule that previously benefited them ended.

The later Mormaers are thought to have originated in Pictish times, and to have been copied from, or inspired by, Northumbrian usages. It is unclear whether the Mormaers were originally former kings, royal officials, or local nobles, or some combination of these. Likewise, the Pictish shires and thanages, traces of which are found in later times, are thought to have been adopted from their southern neighbours.

== Society ==
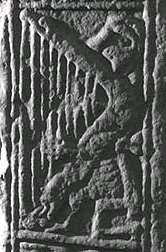
The harpist on the Dupplin Cross, Scotland, c. 800 AD

The archaeological record gives insight into the Picts' material culture, and suggest a society not readily distinguishable from its British, Gaelic, or Anglo-Saxon neighbours. Although analogy and knowledge of other Celtic societies may be a useful guide, these extend across a very large area. Relying on knowledge of pre-Roman Gaul, or 13th-century Ireland, as a guide to the Picts of the 6th century may be misleading if the analogy is pursued too far.

Like most northern European people in Late Antiquity, the Picts were farmers living in small communities. Cattle and horses were an obvious sign of wealth and prestige. Sheep and pigs were kept in large numbers, and place names suggest that transhumance was common. Animals were small by later standards, although horses from Britain were imported into Ireland as breeding stock to enlarge native horses. From Irish sources, it appears that the elite engaged in competitive cattle breeding for size, and this may have been the case in Pictland also. Carvings show hunting with dogs, and also, unlike in Ireland, with falcons. Cereal crops included wheat, barley, oats and rye. Vegetables included kale, cabbage, onions and leeks, peas and beans and turnips, and some types no longer common, such as skirret. Plants such as wild garlic, nettles and watercress may have been gathered in the wild. The pastoral economy meant that hides and leather were readily available. Wool was the main source of fibres for clothing, and flax was also common, although it is not clear if they grew it for fibres, for oil, or as a foodstuff. Fish, shellfish, seals, and whales were exploited along coasts and rivers. The importance of domesticated animals suggests that meat and milk products were a major part of the diet of ordinary people, while the elite would have eaten a diet rich in meat from farming and hunting.

No Pictish counterparts to the areas of denser settlement around important fortresses in Gaul and southern Britain, or any other significant urban settlements, are known. Larger, but not large, settlements existed around royal forts, such as at Burghead Fort, or associated with religious foundations. No towns are known in Scotland until the 12th century.

The technology of everyday life is not well recorded, but archaeological evidence shows it to have been similar to that in Ireland and Anglo-Saxon England. Recently evidence has been found of watermills in Pictland. Kilns were used for drying kernels of wheat or barley, not otherwise easy in the changeable, temperate climate.

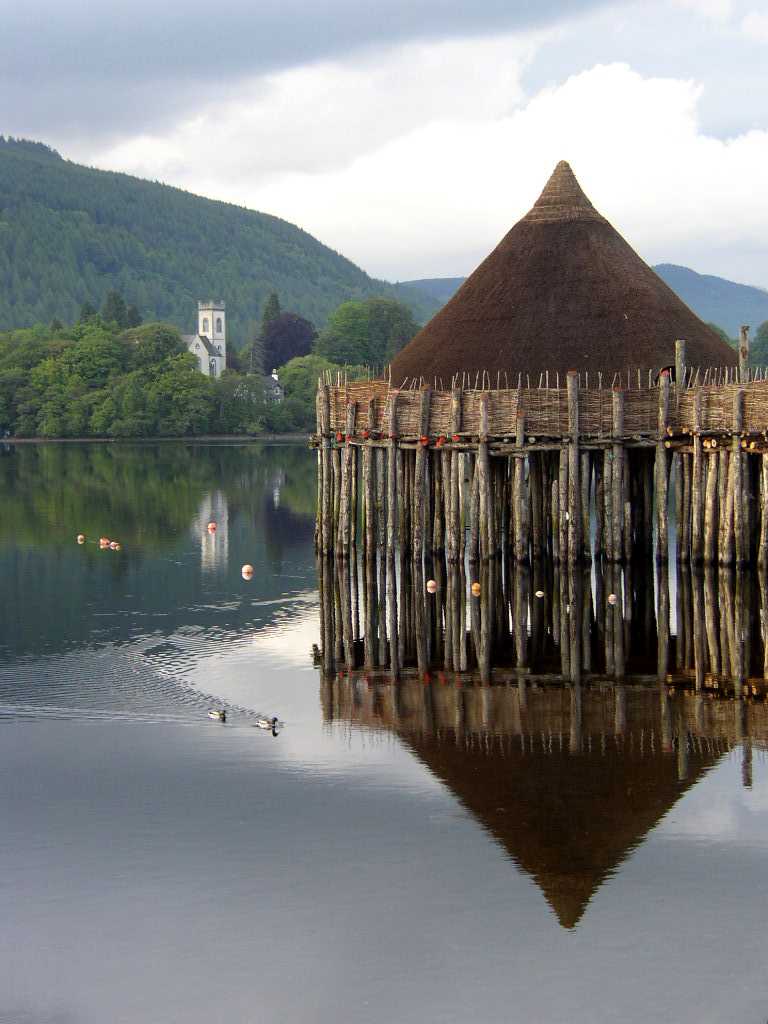
Reconstructed crannog on Loch Tay

The early Picts are associated with piracy and raiding along the coasts of Roman Britain. Even in the Late Middle Ages, the line between traders and pirates was unclear, so that Pictish pirates were probably merchants on other occasions. It is generally assumed that trade collapsed with the Roman Empire, but this is to overstate the case. There is only limited evidence of long-distance trade with Pictland, but tableware and storage vessels from Gaul, probably transported up the Irish Sea, have been found. This trade may have been controlled from Dunadd in Dál Riata, where such goods appear to have been common. While long-distance travel was unusual in Pictish times, it was far from unknown as stories of missionaries, travelling clerics and exiles show.

Brochs are popularly associated with the Picts. Although built earlier in the Iron Age, with construction ending around 100 AD, they remained in use beyond the Pictish period. Crannogs, which may originate in Neolithic Scotland, may have been rebuilt, and some were still in use in the time of the Picts. The most common sort of buildings would have been roundhouses and rectangular timbered halls. While many churches were built in wood, from the early 8th century, if not earlier, some were built in stone.

The Picts are often said to have tattooed themselves, but evidence for this is limited. Naturalistic depictions of Pictish nobles, hunters and warriors, male and female, without obvious tattoos, are found on monumental stones. These include inscriptions in Latin and ogham script, not all of which have been deciphered. The well-known Pictish symbols found on standing stones and other artefacts have defied attempts at translation over the centuries. Pictish art can be classed as "Celtic" and later as Insular. Irish poets portrayed their Pictish counterparts as very much like themselves.

== Religion ==
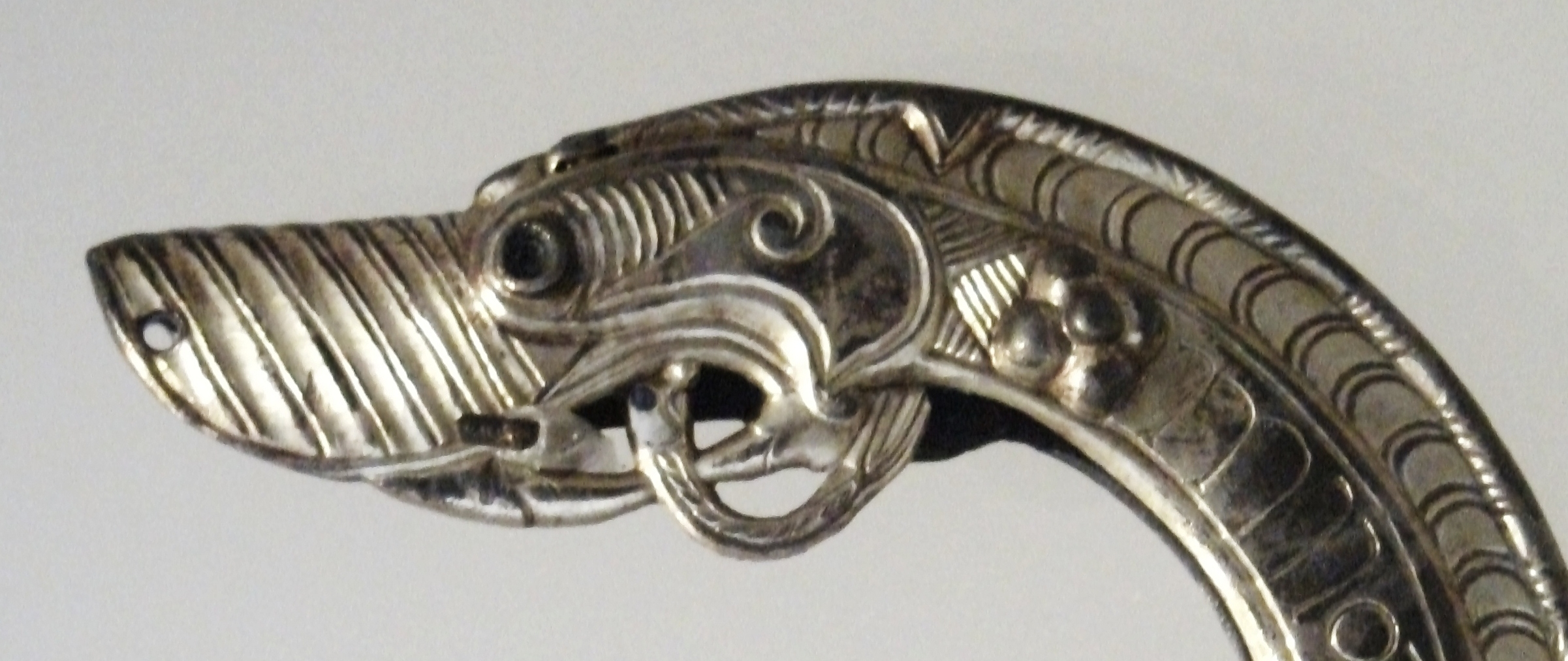
Animal head from St Ninian's Isle Treasure (c.750–825 AD), found in Shetland

Early Pictish religion is presumed to have resembled Celtic polytheism in general, although only place names remain from the pre-Christian era. When the Pictish elite converted to Christianity is uncertain, but traditions place Saint Palladius in Pictland after he left Ireland, and link Abernethy with Saint Brigid of Kildare. Saint Patrick refers to "apostate Picts", while the poem Y Gododdin does not remark on the Picts as pagans. Bede wrote that Saint Ninian (confused by some with Saint Finnian of Moville, who died c. 589), had converted the southern Picts. Recent archaeological work at Portmahomack places the foundation of the monastery there, an area once assumed to be among the last converted, in the late 6th century. This is contemporary with Bridei mac Maelchon and Columba, but the process of establishing Christianity throughout Pictland will have extended over a much longer period.

Pictland was not solely influenced by Iona and Ireland. It also had ties to churches in Northumbria, as seen in the reign of Nechtan mac Der Ilei. The reported expulsion of Ionan monks and clergy by Nechtan in 717 may have been related to the controversy over the dating of Easter, and the manner of tonsure, where Nechtan appears to have supported the Roman usages, but may equally have been intended to increase royal power over the church. Nonetheless, the evidence of place names suggests a wide area of Ionan influence in Pictland. Likewise, the Cáin Adomnáin (Law of Adomnán, Lex Innocentium) counts Nechtan's brother Bridei among its guarantors.

The importance of monastic centres in Pictland was not as great as in Ireland. In areas that have been studied, such as Strathspey and Perthshire, it appears that the parochial structure of the High Middle Ages existed in early medieval times. Among the major religious sites of eastern Pictland were Portmahomack, Cennrígmonaid (later St Andrews), Dunkeld, Abernethy and Rosemarkie. It appears that these are associated with Pictish kings, which argue for a considerable degree of royal patronage and control of the church. Portmahomack in particular has been the subject of recent excavation and research, published by Martin Carver.

The cult of saints was, as throughout Christian lands, of great importance in later Pictland. While kings might venerate great saints, such as Saint Peter in the case of Nechtan, and perhaps Saint Andrew in the case of the second Óengus mac Fergusa, many lesser saints, some now obscure, were important. The Pictish Saint Drostan appears to have had a wide following in the north in earlier times, although he was all but forgotten by the 12th century. Saint Serf of Culross was associated with Nechtan's brother Bridei. It appears, as is well known in later times, that noble kin groups had their own patron saints, and their own churches or abbeys.

== Art ==
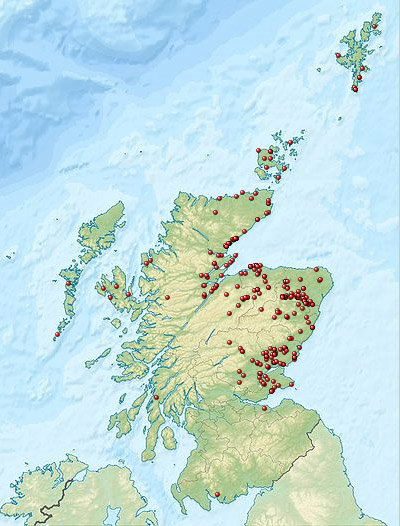
Distribution of Pictish symbol stones and cross slabs

Pictish art is primarily associated with monumental stones, but also includes smaller objects of stone and bone, and metalwork such as brooches. It uses a distinctive form of the general Celtic early medieval development of La Tène style with increasing influences from the Insular art of 7th and 8th century Ireland and Northumbria, and then Anglo-Saxon and Irish art as the early medieval period continues. The most well-known surviving examples are the many Pictish stones located across Pictland.

The symbols and patterns consist of animals including the Pictish Beast, the "rectangle", the "mirror and comb", "double-disc and Z-rod" and the "crescent and V-rod", among many others. There are also bosses and lenses with pelta and spiral designs. The patterns are curvilinear with hatchings. The cross-slabs are carved with Pictish symbols, Insular-derived interlace and Christian imagery, though interpretation is often difficult due to wear and obscurity. Several of the Christian images carved on various stones, such as David the harpist, Daniel and the lion, or scenes of St Paul and St Anthony meeting in the desert, have been influenced by the Insular manuscript tradition.

Pictish metalwork is found throughout Pictland (modern-day Scotland) and also further south; the Picts appeared to have a considerable amount of silver available, probably from raiding further south, or the payment of subsidies to keep them from doing so. The very large hoard of late Roman hacksilver found at Traprain Law may have originated in either way. The largest hoard of early Pictish metalwork was found in 1819 at Norrie's Law in Fife, but unfortunately much was dispersed and melted down (Scots law on treasure finds has always been unhelpful to preservation). A famous 7th century silver and enamel plaque from the hoard has a "Z-rod", one of the Pictish symbols, in a particularly well-preserved and elegant form; unfortunately few comparable pieces have survived.

Over ten heavy silver chains, some over 0.5m long, have been found from this period; the double-linked Whitecleuch Chain is one of only two that have a penannular linking piece for the ends, with symbol decoration including enamel, which shows how these were probably used as "choker" necklaces.

In the 8th and 9th centuries, after Christianization, the Pictish elite adopted a particular form of the Irish Celtic brooch, preferring true penannular brooches with lobed terminals. Some older Irish brooches were adapted to the Pictish style, for example, the c. 8th century Breadalbane Brooch now in the British Museum. The St Ninian's Isle Treasure (c. 750–825 AD) contains the best collection of Pictish forms. Other characteristics of Pictish metalwork are dotted backgrounds or designs and animal forms influenced by Insular art. The 8th century Monymusk Reliquary has elements of Pictish and Irish styles.

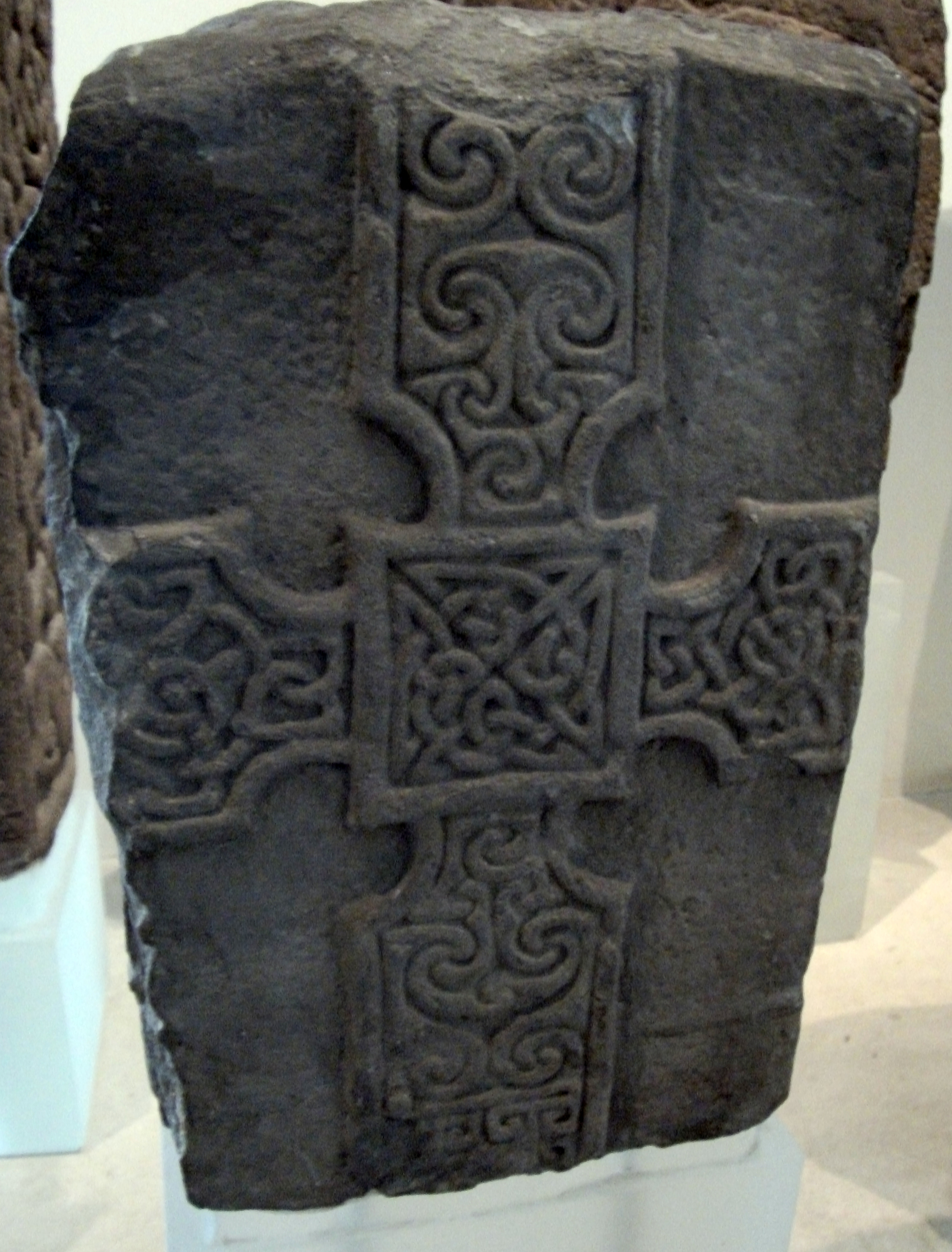
Pictish cross from the Monifieth Sculptured Stones, Museum of Scotland

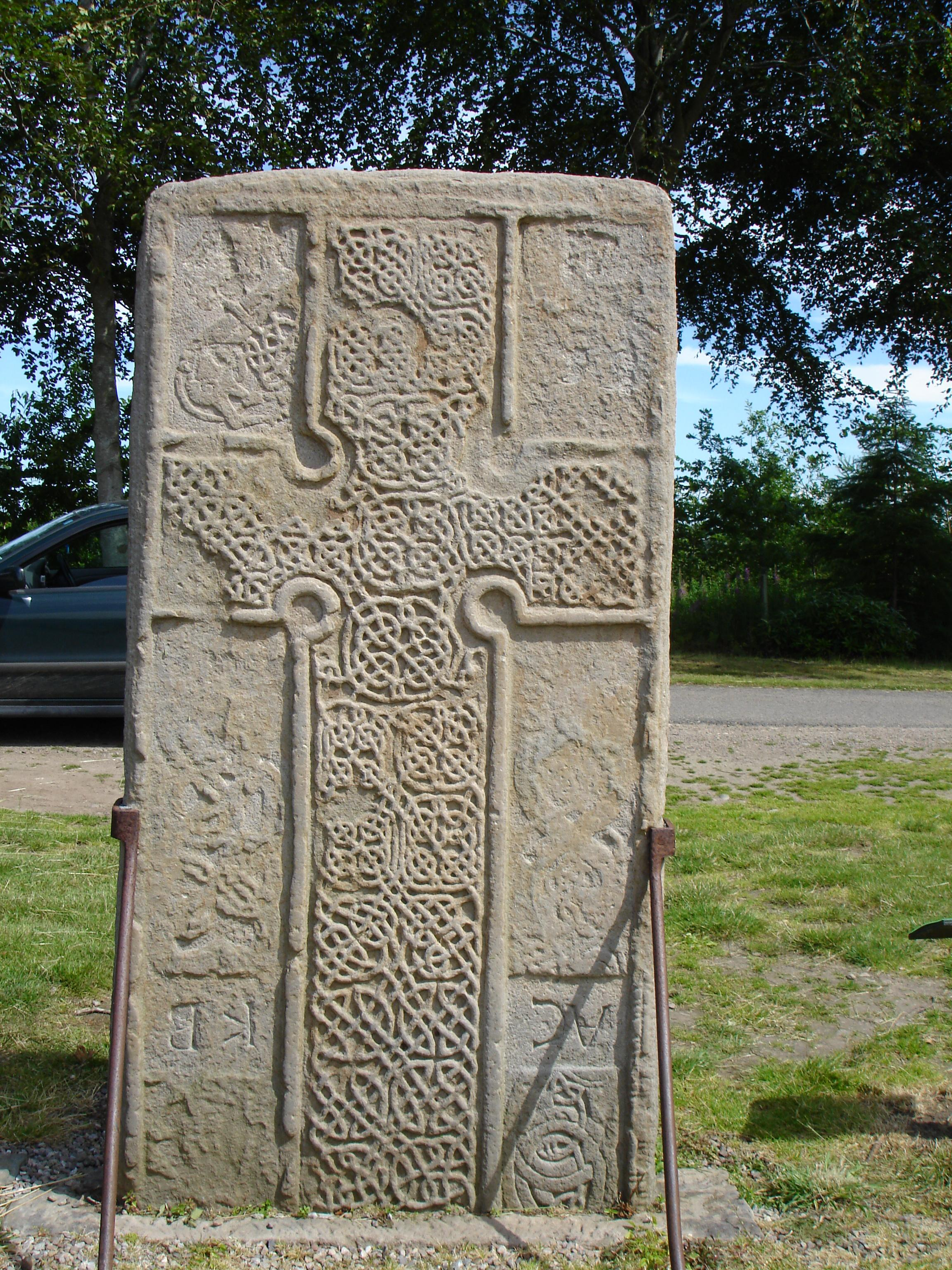
Rodney's Stone (back-face), Brodie Castle, Forres

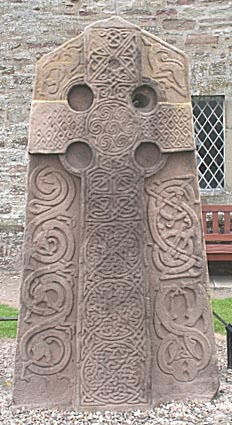
The Aberlemno Kirkyard Stone, Class II Pictish stone

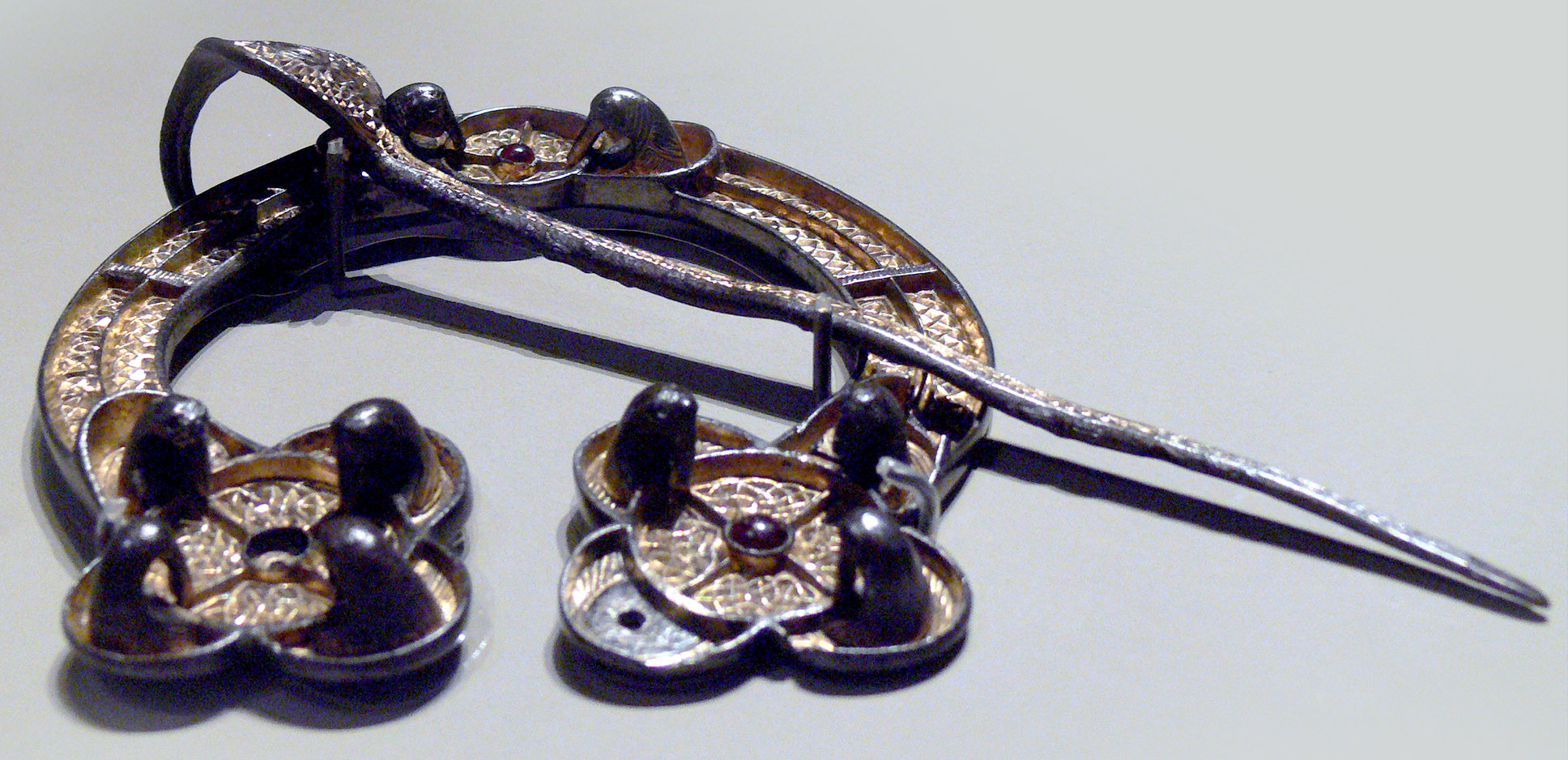
The Rogart Brooch, 8th century

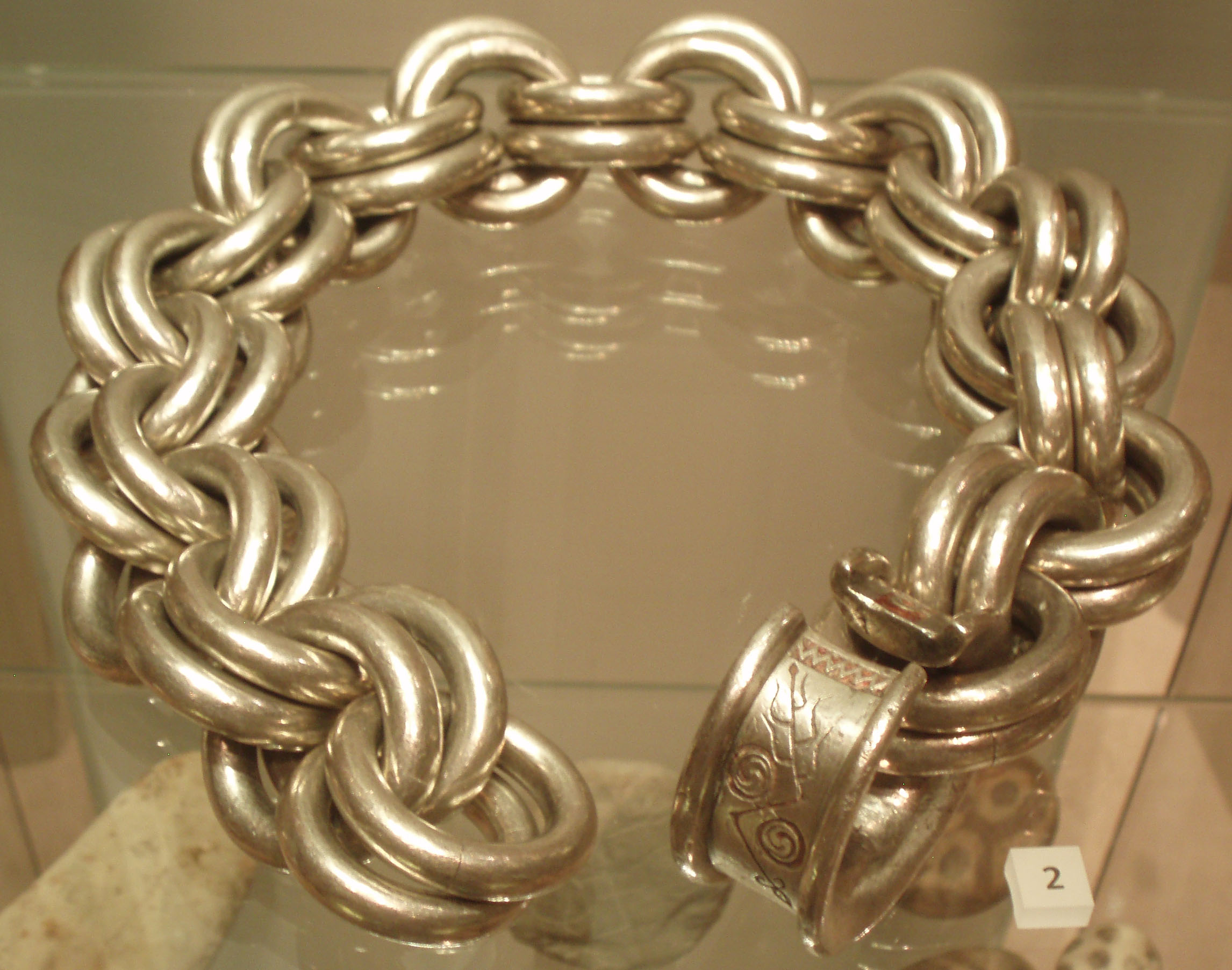
Whitecleuch Chain, c. 400–800 AD. National Museum of Scotland

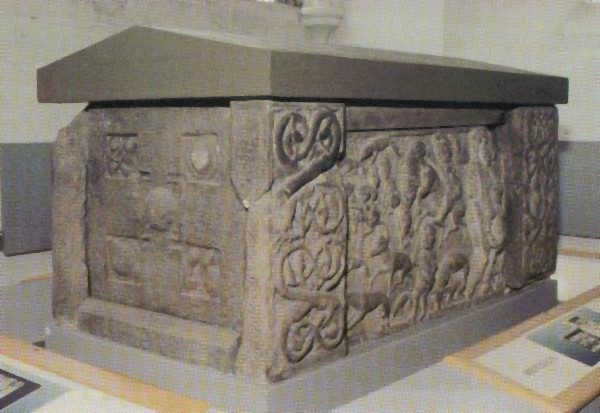
St Andrews Sarcophagus, second half of the 8th century

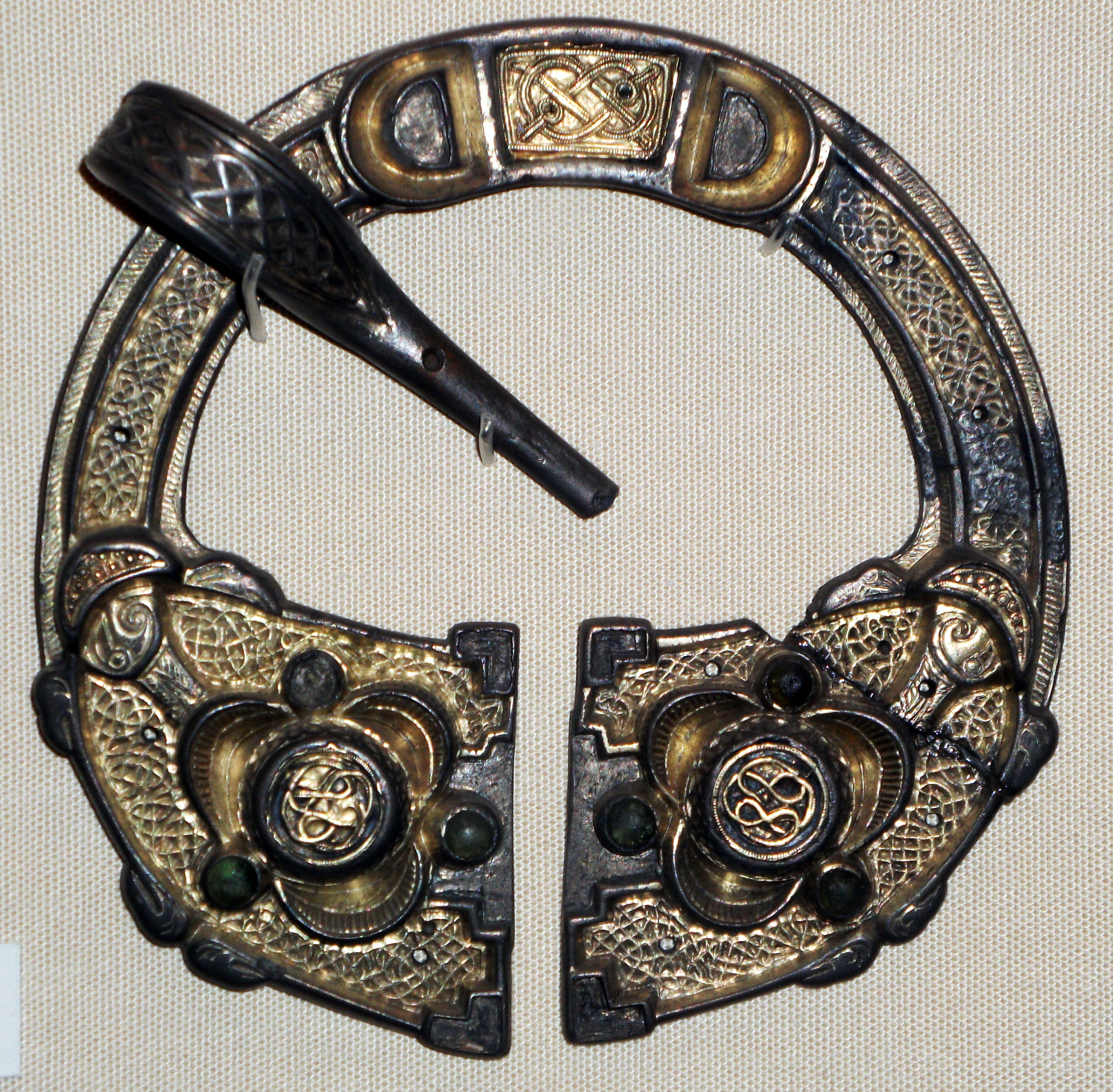
The Breadalbane Brooch, 8th or 9th century, British Museum

== Language ==
The Pictish language is extinct. Evidence is limited to place-names, personal names, several inscriptions and contemporary records in other languages. The evidence of place and personal names appears to indicate that the Picts spoke an Insular Celtic language, potentially related to the Brittonic languages; either having a distinct branch of Insular Celtic known as Pritenic, or being together with other Brythonic languages like Welsh or Cumbric, diverging from other languages due to the lack of Latin influence. The lack of surviving written material in Pictish does not indicate a pre-literate society; the church certainly required literacy in Latin, and could not function without copyists to produce liturgical documents. Pictish iconography shows books being read and carried, and its naturalistic style gives every reason to suppose that such images were of real life. Literacy was not widespread, but among the senior clergy, and in monasteries, it would have been common enough. It is likely that the Pictish language influenced the development, grammar and vocabulary of Scottish Gaelic, which has some characteristics unique among the Goidelic languages and which, in certain cases, are more reminiscent of Brittonic languages.

Toponymic evidence indicates the advance of Gaelic into Pictland; for example, Atholl, meaning New Ireland, is attested in the early 8th century. Fortriu also contains place names suggesting Gaelic settlement, or Gaelic influences. A pre-Gaelic interpretation of the name as Athfocla meaning 'north pass' or 'north way', as in gateway to Moray, suggests that the Gaelic Athfotla may be a Gaelic misreading of the minuscule c for t.

Ogham inscriptions on Pictish stones and other Pictish archaeological objects survive. These were argued by several linguists to be unintelligible as Celtic and evidence for the coexistence of a non-Celtic language in Pictish times. Despite visible advancement of interpretations, the nature of the inscriptions continues to be a matter of debate.

== See also ==
- List of Celtic tribes
- Origins of the Kingdom of Alba
- Painted pebbles
- Picts in fantasy
- Picts in literature and popular culture
- Prehistoric Scotland
