= Anglo-Latin literature =

Latin literature presented in English-speaking countries

Anglo-Latin literature consists of works originally written in Latin and produced in England or other English-speaking parts of Britain and Ireland. It was written in Medieval Latin, which differs from the earlier Classical Latin and Late Latin.

== Authors and style ==
Chroniclers such as Bede (672/3–735), with his Historia ecclesiastica gentis Anglorum, and Gildas (c. 500–570), with his De Excidio et Conquestu Britanniae, were figures in the development of indigenous Latin literature, mostly ecclesiastical, in the centuries following the withdrawal of the Roman Empire around the year 410.

The Vita Sancti Cuthberti (c. 699–705) is the first piece of Northumbrian Latin writing and the earliest piece of English Latin hagiography. The Historia Brittonum composed in the 9th century is traditionally ascribed to Nennius. It is the earliest source which presents King Arthur as a historical figure, and is the source of several stories which were repeated and amplified by later authors.

In the 10th century the hermeneutic style became dominant, but post-Norman Conquest writers such as William of Malmesbury condemned it as barbarous.

== See also ==
=== Early medieval ===
- Aldhelm (c. 639 – 709)
- Bede
- Stephen of Ripon, Vita sancti Wilfrithi
- Alcuin
- Asser
- Wulfstan of Winchester
- Frithegod
- Ælfric Bata
- Wulfstan II of York
- Byrhtferth of Ramsey

=== Anglo-Norman era ===
- Anselm of Canterbury
- Goscelin of St Bertin
- Folchard of St Bertin (fl. 1066)
- Godfrey of Winchester
- Osbern of Canterbury
- Eadmer of Canterbury
- Turgot of Durham
- Symeon of Durham, Libellus de exordio
- Orderic Vitalis (1075 – c. 1142)
- William of Malmesbury (c. 1080/1095 – c. 1143)
- Gilbert Crispin (c. 1055 – 1117)
- Peter Alfonsi (died after 1116)
- Adelard of Bath (died c. 1142–1152?)
- Osbert of Clare
- Lawrence of Durham
- Aelred of Rievaulx
- Hugh of Pontefract
- Serlo of Fountains
- Geoffrey of Monmouth (1100 – c. 1155), Historia Regum Britanniæ

=== Plantagenet era ===
- John of Salisbury (c. 1120 – c. 1180)
- Gervase of Tilbury (c. 1150 – c. 1228)
- Gerald of Wales (1146–1243)
- Michael Scot (1175 – c. 1232)
- Alexander of Hales (c. 1185 – 1245)
- Roger Bacon (c. 1214 – 1294)
- Duns Scotus (c. 1266 – 8 November 1308)
- William of Ockham (c. 1288 – c. 1348)
- Richard Rolle (c. 1305 – 1349)
- John Gower (c. 1330 – October 1408), Vox Clamantis
- Thomas More (7 February 1478 – 6 July 1535), Utopia

=== Modern literature ===
- Francis Bacon (22 January 1561 – 9 April 1626), Novum Organum
- John Barclay (28 January 1582 – 15 August 1621), Argenis
- Thomas Hobbes (5 April 1588 – 4 December 1679)
- Arthur Johnston (c. 1579–1641)
- John Johnston (1570?–1611)
- John Milton (9 December 1608 – 8 November 1674), Defensio pro Populo Anglicano, De Doctrina Christiana
- Isaac Newton (4 January 1643 – 31 March 1727), Philosophiæ Naturalis Principia Mathematica
- Vincent Bourne (1695 – 1747)

== See also ==
- British Latin
- British literature
- Dictionary of Medieval Latin from British Sources
- Hermeneutic style
- Hiberno-Latin
- Latin literature
- Literature in the other languages of Britain
- Traditional English pronunciation of Latin
- Vulgar Latin
