= Insular Latin =

Insular Latin may refer to:

- Anglo-Latin literature, written in England and throughout Britain, with an influence from English
- British Latin, used in Roman and sub-Roman Britain, with an influence from Common Brittonic/Brythonic
- Hiberno-Latin, used in Ireland and in monasteries founded by Irish monks, with an influence from Irish Gaelic
- Latin in Scotland, with an influence from Scottish Gaelic and the Scots language
