= St. John of Beverley (school) =

Private school in Novaliches, Quezon City, Philippines

Coordinates: 14°42′21″N 121°02′15″E

Information
- Established: 1995; 31 years ago
- Founder: Dr. Erlinda P. Mercado
- Website: sjb.edu.ph

St. John of Beverly (abbreviated SJB) is a DepEd-recognized primary, secondary, and tertiary educational institution located in Novaliches Town Proper, Quezon City, Philippines. It was established and currently led by Dr. Erlinda P. Mercado in 1995. The name of school was inspired by Saint John of Beverley. The school's motto is "Leaders are made, so let SJB make one for you."
