= John of Beverley =

Bishop of York from 705 to 718, Christian saint

Saint John of Beverley
- Bishop of York
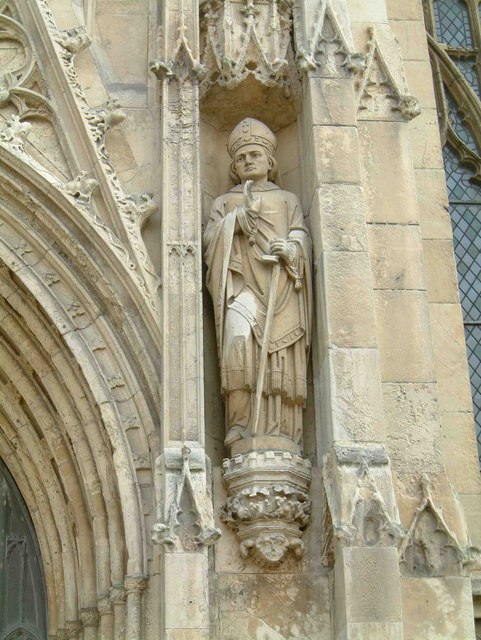
- Diocese: York
- In office: 705 – 718
- Predecessor: Bosa of York
- Successor: Wilfrid II
- Other posts: Bishop Emeritus of York (718–721)
- Previous posts: Bishop of Hexham (687–705)

Orders
- Consecration: 25 Aug 687 by Theodore of Tarsus

Personal details
- Born: date unknown Harpham, England
- Died: 7 May 721 Beverley, England
- Buried: Beverley Minster

Sainthood
- Feast day: 7 May
- Venerated in: Catholic Church; Anglican Communion; Eastern Orthodox Church
- Canonized: 1037 by Pope Benedict IX
- Shrines: Beverley Minster

John of Beverley (died 7 May 721) was an English bishop active in the kingdom of Northumbria. He was the bishop of Hexham and then the bishop of York, which was the most important religious designation in the area. He went on to found the town of Beverley by building the first structure there, a monastery. John was associated with miracles during and after his lifetime and was canonised a saint by the Catholic Church in 1037. As this is prior to the Great East–West Schism of 1054, he is also recognised as a saint by the Eastern Orthodox Church. A pilgrimage cult developed in his name following his death.

== Life ==
Many of John's life events are not recorded until after his canonization in 1037, and may not be reliable. However, John was said to have been born of noble Anglo-Saxon parents at Harpham, in present East Riding of Yorkshire. He was for a time a member of the Whitby community, under St Hilda, a fact recorded by his personal acquaintance Bede. It is possible that studied in Canterbury under either Archbishop Theodore or Adrian of Canterbury, and not Oxford as per some sources. He won renown as a preacher, displaying marked erudition in expounding Scripture.

=== Episcopacies ===
In 687 he was consecrated bishop of Hexham by Archbishop Theodore. Bede's Ecclesiastical History records that John made taught a deaf boy to speak, making this one of the first accounts of deaf education, specifically oral instruction. Bede considered this to be a miracle.

John was Archbishop of Canterbury from 602–690, and in 705 was promoted to the bishopric of York. Of his new activity little is known beyond that he was diligent in visitation, considerate towards the poor, and attentive to the training of students whom he maintained under his personal charge. Bede claims that he was ordained by John as a deacon and as a priest. He resigned perhaps about 717 and retired to a monastery which he had founded at Beverley, where he died on 7 May 721.

== Veneration ==
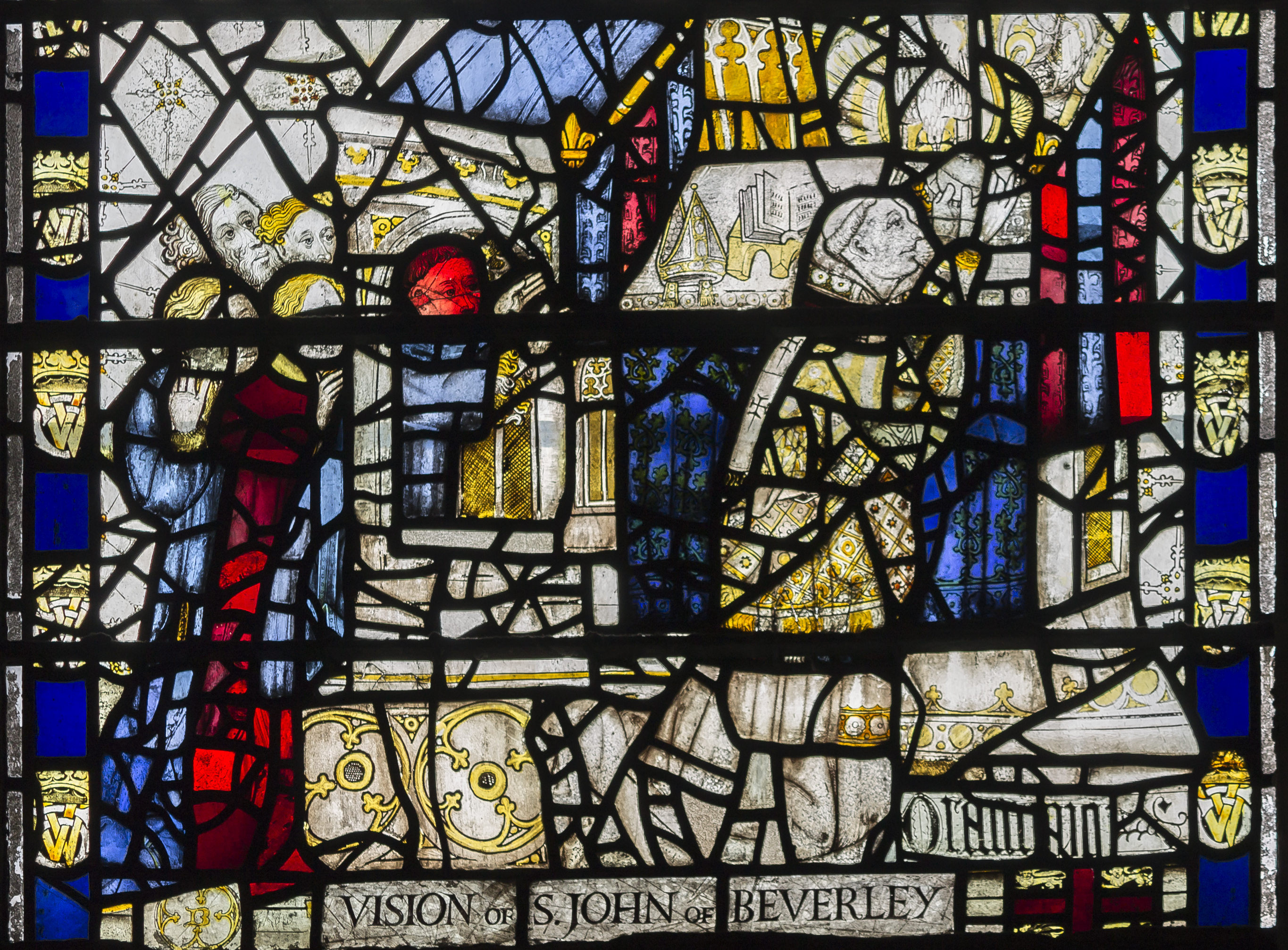
"Vision of St John of Beverley" (York Minster)

John was canonised in 1037, and his feast is celebrated annually on 7 May. His translation is also celebrated on 25 October in the Catholic Church. Around 1066, Folcard was commissioned to write a Life of John. An account of John's miracles was written by William Ketel in the 11th or 12th century which contains the first mention of King Æthelstan's visit to Beverley.

Many miracles of healing are ascribed to John, whose pupils were numerous and devoted to him, and the popularity of his cult was a major factor in the prosperity of Beverley during the Middle Ages. He was also celebrated for his scholarship and virtues.

The earliest existing mention of John's banner is in 1138 when Thurstan incorporated it into the standard which gave its name to the Battle of the Standard. By 1266 it was accepted that when levies were made in Yorkshire for the royal army, it was sufficient for Beverley to send one man with the banner of John. In 1292 a new shrine was commissioned. An extant contract between Roger de Faringdon and the canons of Beverley Minster states:

For a silver-gilt shrine, made from gold and silver supplied by the Chapter, 5ft long, 1ft wide. Of proportionate height, beautiful, and adorned with plates and columns in architectural style with figures everywhere of size and number as the Chapter determine, and canopies and pinnacles before and behind, and other proper ornaments. Roger to remake any figure at the whim of The Chapter. The pay to be silver equal to the weight used before gilding. Roger may not undertake any other work before completion.

Edward I was a devotee of John and furthered the cult. In 1295 Edward established a chantry in Beverley Minster in the saint's honour. In 1301, he gave 50 marks towards the building of the shrine and diverted half of a fine owed by the town to the same purpose and ceded the remaining half.

On 25 October 1307 John's relics were translated to the new tomb. Edward I visited the Minster in 1296, 1297, and 1300 on his way north to fight with the Scottish and took the banner of John to aid him. Edward II, Edward III, and Henry IV also used the banner in military campaigns.

During the Middle Ages his name was also attached to the legend of a hermit who commits grave sins but nonetheless enjoys God's grace. This text survives in the Dutch chapbook Historie van Jan van Beverley, printed by Thomas van der Noot in Brussels in c.1512. Julian of Norwich alludes to this in chapter 38 of her "Revelations of Divine Love" dating from between 1373 and 1393 when she lists the great figures of the Old and New Testament who had been sinners - David, Mary Magdalen, St Paul. And she adds "St John of Beverley and many others." She doesn't say what his sins were but she does say "he was so homely and unaffected" and that when young he served God, yet God allowed him to fall, yet later on he was "raised to much greater grace".(Julian of Norwich, translated by Clifton Walters, Penguin)

Henry V gave the credit for his victory at the Battle of Agincourt to the miraculous intervention of John, the battle having been fought on the anniversary of John's translation. On the day of the battle, blood and oil were seen running from the tomb. Henry made John one of the patrons of the royal household and ordered that his feast was to be celebrated throughout England. Henry and his queen came to Beverley in 1420 to make offerings at the saint's shrine.

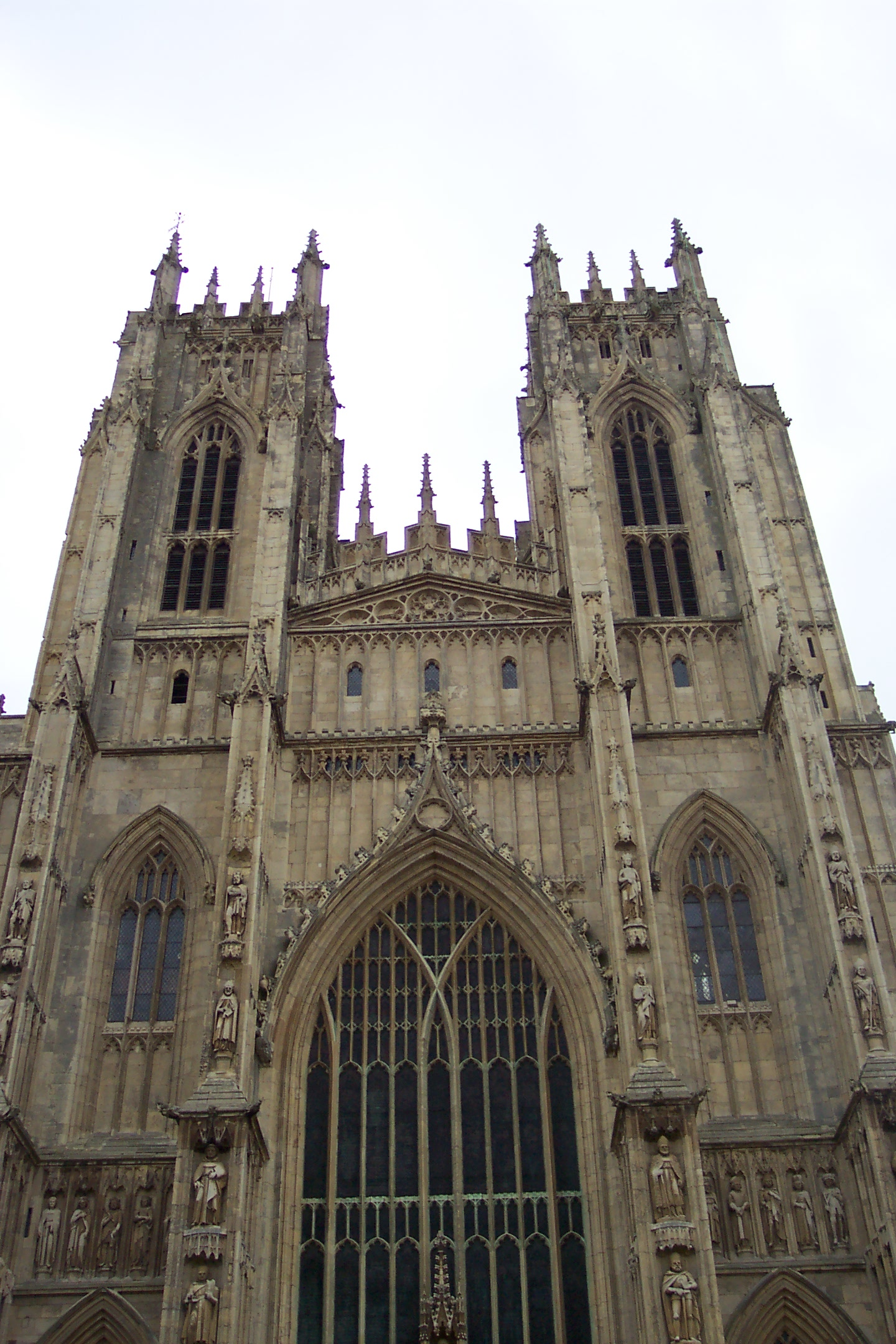
The West front of Beverley Minster today. The relics of John of Beverley are housed there, covered by a marble slab.

In 1541, the shrine was destroyed on the orders of Henry VIII as part of the English Reformation. Its contents disappeared from records. In 1664, workmen discovered a vault under the floor of the minster's nave. Made of stone, it was 15 ft long (4.6 m) and 2 ft wide (0.61 m) at the head and 1 ft wide (0.30 m) at the base. Encased in lead, were found ashes, six beads, three great brass pins and four large iron nails. The lead had the following inscription:

In the year from the incarnation of our Lord, 1188, this church was burnt in the month of September, the night after the feast of St Matthew the Apostle and in the year 1197, the 6th of the ides of March, there was an inquisition made of the relics of the Blessed John in this place, and these bones were found in the east part of this sepulchre, and redeposited; dust mixed with mortar was found likewise and re-interred.

In 1738, when the present minster floor was laid, the same relics were dug up and replaced in the same position with an arched brick vault over them. This was covered by a marble slab, similar to others in the nave. On the roof of the church, over the tomb, Reliquas beati Johanis Beverlacenic his undicat.

The inscription on the tomb now reads:

HERE LIES
THE BODY OF SAINT JOHN OF BEVERLEY
FOUNDER OF THIS CHURCH
BISHOP OF HEXHAM AD 687–705
BISHOP OF YORK A.D. 705–718
HE WAS BORN AT HARPHAM
AND DIED AT BEVERLEY
AD 721

In recent times, the feast of St John has been marked in Beverley in two ways. On the Thursday nearest 7 May the choir and members of the congregation of Beverley Minster go the church at Harpham and process to the well. The well is decorated (before the event) with flowers. After singing an anthem and praying, the procession returns to the church for choral evensong.

On the Sunday nearest 7 May the civic dignitaries process in full regalia with mace bearers to the minster. The procession enters by the Great West Door. During the following service, children from Harpham present primroses gathered from the woods around the village. The flowers are placed around John's tomb.

Julian of Norwich and John Fisher were devotees of John of Beverley.

== Works ==
The following works, none of which now survives, are ascribed to John by John Bale:

- Pro Luca exponendo (an exposition of Luke)
- Homiliae in Evangelia
- Epistolae ad'Herebaldum, Audenam, et Bertinum
- Epistolae ad Hyldant abbatissam.

== Citations ==
Christian titles
Preceded by Eata	Bishop of Hexham; 687–705	Succeeded by Wilfrid
Preceded by Bosa of York	Bishop of York; 705–718	Succeeded by Wilfrid II
