= Wilfrid =

Christian saint, Bishop of York from 664 to 678

Saint Wilfrid
- Bishop of York
- Appointed: 664
- Term ended: 678
- Predecessor: Chad
- Successor: Bosa of York

Orders
- Consecration: 664

Personal details
- Born: c. 633 Northumbria
- Died: 709 or 710 Oundle, Northamptonshire

Sainthood
- Feast day: 12 October or 24 April
- Venerated in: Catholic Church; Eastern Orthodox Church; Anglican Communion
- Attributes: baptising, preaching, landing from a ship and received by the king; or engaged in theological disputation with his crozier near him and a lectern before him
- Patronage: Roman Catholic Diocese of Middlesbrough; Roman Catholic Diocese of Leeds; Ripon
- Shrines: Ripon, Sompting (Sussex), and Frisia (Roeder).

Wilfrid (Note: Originally spelled Wilfrith.) (c. 633 – 709 or 710) was an English bishop and saint. Born a Northumbrian noble, he entered religious life as a teenager and studied at Lindisfarne, at Canterbury, in Francia, and in Rome; he returned to Northumbria in about 660, and became the abbot of a newly founded monastery at Ripon. In 664, Wilfrid acted as spokesman for the Roman position at the Synod of Whitby, and became famous for his speech advocating that the Roman method for calculating the date of Easter should be adopted. His success prompted the king's son, Alhfrith, to appoint him Bishop of Northumbria. Wilfrid chose to be consecrated in Gaul because of the lack of what he considered to be validly consecrated bishops in England at that time. During Wilfrid's absence, Alhfrith seems to have led an unsuccessful revolt against his father, Oswiu, leaving a question mark over Wilfrid's appointment as bishop. Before Wilfrid's return, Oswiu had appointed Ceadda in his place, resulting in Wilfrid's retirement to Ripon for a few years following his arrival back in Northumbria.

After becoming Archbishop of Canterbury in 668, Theodore of Tarsus resolved the situation by deposing Ceadda and restoring Wilfrid as the Bishop of Northumbria. For the next nine years, Wilfrid discharged his episcopal duties, founded monasteries, built churches, and improved the liturgy. However, his diocese was very large, and Theodore wished to reform the English Church, a process which included breaking up some of the larger dioceses into smaller ones. When Wilfrid quarrelled with Ecgfrith, the Northumbrian king, Theodore took the opportunity to implement his reforms despite Wilfrid's objections. After Ecgfrith expelled him from York, Wilfrid travelled to Rome to appeal to the papacy. Pope Agatho ruled in Wilfrid's favour, but Ecgfrith refused to honour the papal decree and instead imprisoned Wilfrid on his return to Northumbria before exiling him.

Wilfrid spent the next few years in Selsey, now in West Sussex, where he founded an episcopal see and converted the pagan inhabitants of the Kingdom of Sussex to Christianity. Theodore and Wilfrid settled their differences, and Theodore urged the new Northumbrian king, Aldfrith, to allow Wilfrid's return. Aldfrith agreed to do so, but in 691, he expelled Wilfrid again. Wilfrid went to Mercia, where he helped missionaries and acted as bishop for the Mercian king. Wilfrid appealed to the papacy about his expulsion in 700, and the pope ordered that an English council should be held to decide the issue. This council, held at Austerfield in South Yorkshire in 702, attempted to confiscate all of Wilfrid's possessions, and so Wilfrid travelled to Rome to appeal against the decision. His opponents in Northumbria excommunicated him, but the papacy upheld Wilfrid's side, and he regained possession of Ripon and Hexham, his Northumbrian monasteries. Wilfrid died in 709 or 710. After his death, he was venerated as a saint.

Historians then and now have been divided over Wilfrid. His followers commissioned Stephen of Ripon to write a Vita Sancti Wilfrithi (or Life of Saint Wilfrid) shortly after his death, and the medieval historian Bede also wrote extensively about him. Wilfrid lived ostentatiously and travelled with a large retinue. He ruled a large number of monasteries, and claimed to be the first Englishman to introduce the Rule of Saint Benedict into English monasteries. Some modern historians see him mainly as a champion of Roman customs against the customs of the British and Irish churches, others as an advocate for monasticism.

== Background ==
Anglo-Saxon kingdoms in the late 7th century

During Wilfrid's lifetime, Britain and Ireland consisted of a number of small kingdoms. Traditionally the English people were thought to have been divided into seven kingdoms, but modern historiography has shown that this is a simplification of a much more confused situation. A late 7th-century source, the Tribal Hidage, lists the peoples south of the Humber river; among the largest groups of peoples are the West Saxons (later Wessex), the East Angles and Mercians (later the Kingdom of Mercia), and the Kingdom of Kent. Smaller groups who at that time had their own royalty but were later absorbed into larger kingdoms include the peoples of Magonsæte, Lindsey, Hwicce, the East Saxons, the South Saxons, the Isle of Wight, and the Middle Angles. Other even smaller groups had their own rulers, but their size means that they do not often appear in the histories. There were also native Britons in the west, in modern-day Wales and Cornwall, who formed kingdoms including those of Dumnonia, Dyfed, and Gwynedd.

Between the Humber and Forth the English had formed into two main kingdoms, Deira and Bernicia, often united as the Kingdom of Northumbria. A number of Celtic kingdoms also existed in this region, including Craven, Elmet, Rheged, and Gododdin. A native British kingdom, later called the Kingdom of Strathclyde, survived as an independent power into the 10th century in the area which became modern-day Dunbartonshire and Clydesdale. To the north-west of Strathclyde lay the Gaelic kingdom of Dál Riata, and to the north-east a small number of Pictish kingdoms. Further north still lay the great Pictish kingdom of Fortriu, which after the Battle of Dun Nechtain in 685 came to be the strongest power in the northern half of Britain. The Irish had always had contacts with the rest of the British Isles, and during the early 6th century they emigrated from the island of Ireland to form the kingdom of Dál Riata, although exactly how much conquest took place is a matter of dispute with historians. It also appears likely that the Irish settled in parts of Wales, and even after the period of Irish settlement, Irish missionaries were active in Britain.

Christianity had only recently arrived in some of these kingdoms. Some had been converted by the Gregorian mission, a group of Roman missionaries who arrived in Kent in 597 and who mainly influenced southern Britain. Others had been converted by the Hiberno-Scottish mission, chiefly Irish missionaries working in Northumbria and neighbouring kingdoms. A few kingdoms, such as Dál Riata, became Christian but how they did so is unknown. The native Picts, according to the medieval writer Bede, were converted in two stages, initially by native Britons under Ninian, and subsequently by Irish missionaries.

=== Sources ===
The main sources for knowledge of Wilfrid are the medieval Vita Sancti Wilfrithi, written by Stephen of Ripon soon after Wilfrid's death, and the works of the medieval historian Bede, who knew Wilfrid during the bishop's lifetime. Stephen's Vita is a hagiography, intended to show Wilfrid as a saintly man, and to buttress claims that he was a saint. The Vita is selective in its coverage, and gives short shrift to Wilfrid's activities outside of Northumbria. Two-thirds of the work deals with Wilfrid's attempts to return to Northumbria, and is a defence and vindication of his Northumbrian career. Stephen's work is flattering and highly favourable to Wilfrid, making its use as a source problematic; despite its shortcomings, however, the Vita is the main source of information on Wilfrid's life. It views the events in Northumbria in the light of Wilfrid's reputation and from his point of view, and is highly partisan. Another concern is that hagiographies were usually full of conventional material, often repeated from earlier saints' lives, as was the case with Stephen's work. It appears that the Vita Sancti Wilfrithi was not well known in the Middle Ages, as only two manuscripts of the work survive.

Bede also covers Wilfrid's life in his Historia ecclesiastica gentis Anglorum, but this account is more measured and restrained than the Vita. In the Historia, Bede used Stephen's Vita as a source, reworking the information and adding new material when possible. Other, more minor, sources for Wilfrid's life include a mention of Wilfrid in one of Bede's letters. A poetical Vita Sancti Wilfrithi by Frithegod written in the 10th century is essentially a rewrite of Stephen's Vita, produced in celebration of the movement of Wilfrid's relics to Canterbury. Wilfrid is also mentioned in the Anglo-Saxon Chronicle, but as the Chronicle was probably a 9th-century compilation, the material on Wilfrid may ultimately have derived either from Stephen's Vita or from Bede. Another, later, source is the Vita Sancti Wilfrithi written by Eadmer, a 12th-century Anglo-Norman writer and monk from Canterbury. This source is highly influenced by the contemporary concerns of its writer, but does attempt to provide some new material besides reworking Bede.

Many historians, including the editor of Bede's works, Charles Plummer, have seen in Bede's writings a dislike of Wilfrid. The historian Walter Goffart goes further, suggesting that Bede wrote his Historia as a reaction to Stephen's Vita Sancti Wilfrithi, and that Stephen's work was written as part of a propaganda campaign to defend a "Wilfridian" party in Northumbrian politics. Some historians, including James Fraser, find that a credible view, but others such as Nick Higham are less convinced of Bede's hostility to Wilfrid.

== Early life ==
=== Childhood and early education ===
Wilfrid was born in Northumbria around 633. James Fraser argues that Wilfrid's family were aristocrats from Deira, pointing out that most of Wilfrid's early contacts were from that area. A conflict with his stepmother when he was about 14 years old drove Wilfrid to leave home, probably without his father's consent. Wilfrid's background is never explicitly described as noble, but the king's retainers were frequent guests at his father's house, and on leaving home, Wilfrid equipped his party with horses and clothes fit for a royal court.

Queen Eanflæd became Wilfrid's patroness following his arrival at the court of her husband, King Oswiu. She sent him to study under Cudda, formerly one of her husband's retainers, but by that time in about 648 a monk on the island of Lindisfarne. The monastery on the island had recently been founded by Aidan, who had been instrumental in converting Northumbria to Christianity. At Lindisfarne Wilfrid is said to have "learned the whole Psalter by heart and several books". Wilfrid studied at Lindisfarne for a few years before going to the Kentish king's court at Canterbury in 652, where he stayed with relatives of Queen Eanflæd. The queen had given Wilfrid a letter of introduction to pass to her cousin, King Eorcenberht, to ensure that Wilfrid was received by the king. While in Kent, Wilfrid's career was advanced by Eanflæd's cousin Hlothere, who was later the King of Kent from 673 to 685. The Kentish court included a number of visiting clergymen at that time, including Benedict Biscop, a noted missionary. Wilfrid appears to have spent about a year in Kent, but the exact chronology is uncertain.

=== Time at Rome and Lyon ===
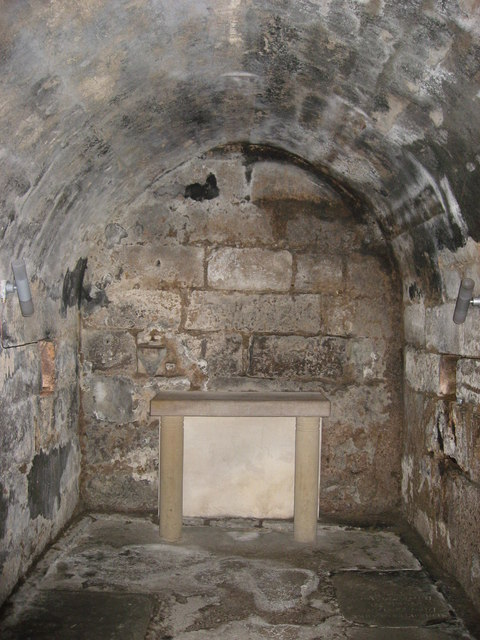
7th-century crypt at Hexham monastery, where Wilfrid may have deposited any relics he brought back from the continent

Wilfrid left Kent for Rome in the company of Benedict Biscop, another of Eanflæd's contacts. This is the first pilgrimage to Rome known to have been undertaken by English natives, and took place some time between 653 and 658. According to Wilfrid's later biographer, Stephen of Ripon, Wilfrid left Biscop's company at Lyon, where Wilfrid stayed under the patronage of Annemund, the archbishop. Stephen says that Annemund wanted to marry Wilfrid to the archbishop's niece, and to make Wilfrid the governor of a Frankish province, but that Wilfrid refused and continued on his journey to Rome. There he learned the Roman method of calculating the date of Easter, and studied the Roman practice of relic collecting. He developed a close friendship with Boniface Consiliarius during his time in Rome. After an audience with the pope, Wilfrid returned to Lyon.

Stephen of Ripon says that Wilfrid stayed in Lyon for three years, leaving only after the archbishop's murder. However, Annemund's murder took place in 660, and Wilfrid returned to England in 658, suggesting that Stephen's chronology is awry. (Note: Annemund was murdered at the command of Balthild, the regent of Chlothar III.) Stephen says that Annemund gave Wilfrid a clerical tonsure, although this does not appear to mean that he became a monk, merely that he entered the clergy. Bede is silent on the subject of Wilfrid's monastic status, although Wilfrid probably became a monk during his time in Rome, or afterwards while he was in Gaul. Some historians, however, believe that Wilfrid was never a monk. While in Gaul, Wilfrid absorbed Frankish ecclesiastical practices, including some aspects from the monasteries founded by Columbanus. This influence may be seen in Wilfrid's probable adoption of a Frankish ceremony in his consecration of churches later in his life, as well as in his employment of Frankish masons to build his churches. Wilfrid would also have learned of the Rule of Saint Benedict in Gaul, as Columbanus' monasteries followed that monastic rule.

=== Abbot of Ripon ===
After Wilfrid's return to Northumbria in about 658, Cenwalh, King of Wessex, recommended Wilfrid to Alhfrith, Oswiu's son, as a cleric well-versed in Roman customs and liturgy. Alhfrith was a sub-king of Deira under his father's rule, and the most likely heir to his father's throne as his half-brothers were still young. Shortly before 664 Alhfrith gave Wilfrid a monastery he had recently founded at Ripon, formed around a group of monks from Melrose Abbey, followers of the Irish monastic customs. Wilfrid ejected the abbot, Eata, because he would not follow the Roman customs; Cuthbert, later a saint, was another of the monks expelled. Wilfrid introduced the Rule of Saint Benedict into Ripon, claiming that he was the first person in England to make a monastery follow it, but this claim rests on the Vita Sancti Wilfrithi and does not say where Wilfrid became knowledgeable about the Rule, nor exactly what form of the Rule was being referred to. Shortly afterwards Wilfrid was ordained a priest by Agilbert, Bishop of Dorchester in the kingdom of the Gewisse, part of Wessex. Wilfrid was a protégé of Agilbert, who later helped in Wilfrid's consecration as a bishop. The monk Ceolfrith was attracted to Ripon from Gilling Abbey, which had recently been depopulated as a result of the plague. Ceolfrith later became Abbot of Wearmouth-Jarrow during the time the medieval chronicler and writer Bede was a monk there. Bede hardly mentions the relationship between Ceolfrith and Wilfrid, but it was Wilfrid who consecrated Ceolfrith a priest and who gave permission for him to transfer to Wearmouth-Jarrow.

== Whitby ==
=== Background to Whitby ===
The Roman churches and those in Britain and Ireland (often called "Celtic" churches) used different methods to calculate the date of Easter. The church in Northumbria had traditionally used the Celtic method, and that was the date observed by King Oswiu. His wife Eanflæd and a son, Alhfrith, celebrated Easter on the Roman date, which meant that while one part of the royal court was still observing the Lenten fast, another would be celebrating with feasting.

Oswiu called a church council held at Whitby Abbey in 664 in an attempt to resolve this controversy. Although Oswiu himself had been brought up in the "Celtic" tradition, political pressures may have influenced his decision to call a council, as well as fears that if dissent over the date of Easter continued in the Northumbrian church it could lead to internal strife. The historian Richard Abels speculates that the expulsion of Eata from Ripon may have been the spark that led to the king's decision to call the council. Regional tensions within Northumbria between the two traditional divisions, Bernicia and Deira, appear to have played a part, as churchmen in Bernicia favoured the Celtic method of dating and those in Deira may have leaned towards the Roman method. Abels identifies several conflicts contributing to both the calling of the council and its outcome, including a generational conflict between Oswiu and Alhfrith and the death of the Archbishop of Canterbury, Deusdedit. Political concerns unrelated to the dating problem, such as the decline of Oswiu's preeminence among the other English kingdoms and the challenge to that position by Mercia, were also factors.

=== Synod ===
Wilfrid attended the synod, or council, of Whitby, as a member of the party favouring the continental practice of dating Easter, along with James the Deacon, Agilbert, and Alhfrith. Those supporting the "Celtic" viewpoint were King Oswiu, Hilda, the Abbess of Whitby, Cedd, a bishop, and Colmán of Lindisfarne, the Bishop of Lindisfarne.

Wilfrid was chosen to present the Roman position to the council; he also acted as Agilbert's interpreter, as the latter did not speak the local language. (Note: Agilbert was later expelled from his English bishopric by the King of Wessex when the king could not understand Agilbert.) Bede describes Wilfrid as saying that those who did not calculate the date of Easter according to the Roman system were committing a sin. Wilfrid's speech in favour of adopting Roman church practices helped secure the eclipse of the "Celtic" party in 664, (Note: It is unclear how much of the speech in Bede's account of the council is actually Wilfrid's and how much was composed by Bede.) although most Irish churches did not adopt the Roman date of Easter until 704, and Iona held out until 716. (Note: Some Welsh churches did not adopt the Roman Easter until 768.) Many of the Irish monasteries did not observe the Roman Easter, but they were not isolated from the continent; by the time of Whitby the southern Irish were already observing the Roman Easter date, and Irish clergy were in contact with their continental counterparts. Those monks and clergy unable to accept the Whitby decision left Northumbria, some going to Ireland and others to Iona.

== York ==
=== Elevation to the episcopate ===
King Oswiu of Northumbria's family tree

After the supporters of the Celtic dating had withdrawn following the Council of Whitby, Wilfrid became the most prominent Northumbrian cleric. As a result, and because of his performance at Whitby, Wilfrid was elected to a bishopric in Northumbria about a year after the council. It is unclear where his diocese was located, although he was considered to be Alhfrith's bishop. The Vita Sancti Wilfrithi states that, nominated by both Oswiu and Alhfrith, he was made bishop at York, and that he was a metropolitan bishop, but York at that time was not a Metropolitan Diocese. (Note: York did not attain metropolitan status until 735.) Bede says that Alhfrith alone nominated Wilfrid, and that Oswiu subsequently proposed an alternative candidate, "imitating the actions of his son". Several theories have been suggested to explain the discrepancies between the two sources. One is that Alhfrith wished the seat to be at York, another is that Wilfrid was bishop only in Deira, a third supposes that Wilfrid was never bishop at York and that his diocese was only part of Deira. At that time the Anglo-Saxon dioceses were not strictly speaking geographical designations; they were bishoprics for the tribes or peoples.

Wilfrid refused to be consecrated in Northumbria at the hands of Anglo-Saxon bishops. Deusdedit had died shortly after Whitby, and as there were no other bishops in Britain whom Wilfrid considered to have been validly consecrated, he travelled to Compiègne, to be consecrated by Agilbert, the Bishop of Paris. During his time in Gaul, Wilfrid was exposed to a higher level of ceremony than that practised in Northumbria, one example of which is that he was carried to his consecration ceremony on a throne supported by nine bishops.

=== Delays and difficulties ===
Wilfrid delayed his return from Gaul, only to find on his arrival back in Northumbria that Ceadda had been installed as bishop in his place. The reason for Wilfrid's delay has never been clear, although the historians Eric John and Richard Abels theorise that it was caused by Alhfrith's unsuccessful revolt against Oswiu. They suggest that the rebellion happened shortly after Whitby, perhaps while Wilfrid was in Gaul for his consecration. Because Oswiu knew that Alhfrith had been a supporter of Wilfrid's, Oswiu prevented Wilfrid's return, suspecting Wilfrid of supporting his rivals. That Ceadda was supported by Oswiu, and Wilfrid had been a supporter of Oswiu's son, lends further credence to the theory that Alhfrith's rebellion took place while Wilfrid was in Gaul. Stephen of Ripon reported that Wilfrid was expelled by "Quartodecimans", or those who supported the celebration of Easter on the 14th day of the Jewish month Nisan, whether or not this was a Sunday. However, as the Irish church had never been Quartodecimans, Stephen in this instance was constructing a narrative to put Wilfrid in the best light.

During his return to Northumbria, Wilfrid's ship was blown ashore on the Sussex coast, the inhabitants of which were at that time pagan. On being attacked by the locals, Wilfrid's party killed the head priest before refloating their ship and making their escape. The historian Marion Gibbs suggests that after this episode, Wilfrid visited Kent again, and took part in the diplomacy related to Wigheard's appointment to the see of Canterbury. Wilfrid may also have taken part in negotiations to persuade King Cenwalh of Wessex to allow Agilbert to return to his see.

=== Favourable outcome ===
Denied episcopal office, Wilfrid spent the three years from 665 to 668 as abbot of the monastery at Ripon. He occasionally performed episcopal functions in Mercia and Kent, but never did so north of the river Humber. The historian James Fraser argues that Wilfrid may not have been allowed to return to Northumbria and instead went into exile at the Mercian court, but most historians have argued that Wilfrid was at Ripon.

Wulfhere of Mercia's family tree

Wilfrid's monasteries in Mercia may date from this time, as King Wulfhere of Mercia gave him large grants of land in Mercia. Wilfrid may have persuaded King Ecgberht of Kent in 669 to build a church in an abandoned Roman fort at Reculver. When Theodore, the newly appointed Archbishop of Canterbury, arrived in England in 669 it was clear that something had to be done about the situation in Northumbria. Ceadda's election to York was improper, and Theodore did not consider Ceadda's consecration to have been valid. Consequently, Theodore deposed Ceadda, (Note: Theodore shortly afterwards reconsecrated Ceadda and gave him the bishopric of Lichfield. The Vita Sancti Wilfrithi says that Wilfrid urged Theodore to appoint Ceadda to Lichfield.) leaving the way open for Wilfrid, who was finally installed in his see in 669, the first Saxon to occupy the see of York. Wilfrid spent the next nine years building churches, including at the monastery at Hexham, and attending to diocesan business. He continued to exercise control over his monastic houses of Ripon and Hexham while he was bishop. Oswiu's death on 15 February 670 eliminated a source of friction and helped to assure Wilfrid's return.

While at York, Wilfrid was considered the "bishop of the Northumbrian peoples"; Bede records that Wilfrid's diocese was contiguous with the area ruled by Oswiu. The diocese was restricted to north of the Humber, however. Wilfrid may also have sought to exercise some ecclesiastical functions in the Pictish kingdom, as he is accorded the title "bishop of the Northumbrians and the Picts" in 669. Further proof of attempted Northumbrian influence in the Pictish regions is provided by the establishment for the Picts in 681 of a diocese centred on Abercorn, in the old territory of the British kingdom of Gododdin. The grants of land to Wilfrid west of the Pennines testify to Northumbrian expansion in that area. The Vita Sancti Wilfrithi claims that Wilfrid had ecclesiastical rule over Britons and Gaels. In 679, while Wilfrid was in Rome, he claimed authority over "all the northern part of Britain, Ireland and the islands, which are inhabited by English and British peoples, as well as by Gaelic and Pictish peoples".

=== Diocesan affairs ===
Wilfrid did not attend the Council of Hertford held in September 672, but he did send representatives. Among the council's resolutions was one postponing a decision on the creation of new dioceses, which affected Wilfrid later. Another ruling confirmed that the Roman calculation for the date of Easter should be adopted, and that bishops should act only in their own dioceses. During the middle 670s Wilfrid acted as middleman in the negotiations to return a Merovingian prince, Dagobert II, from his exile in Ireland to Gaul. (Note: Dagobert became king of Austrasia in 676, but was assassinated in 680.) Wilfrid was one of the first churchmen in Northumbria to use written charters as records of gifts to his churches. He ordered the creation of a listing of all benefactions received by Ripon, which was recited at the dedication ceremony.

Wilfrid was an advocate for the use of music in ecclesiastical ceremonies. He sent to Kent for a singing master to instruct his clergy in the Roman style of church music, which involved a double choir who sang in antiphons and responses. Bede says that this singing master was named Æddi (or Eddius in Latin) and had the surname Stephen. Traditionally, historians have identified Æddi as Stephen of Ripon, author of the Vita Sancti Wilfrithi, which has led to the assumption that the Vita was based on the recollections of one of Wilfrid's long-time companions. Recent scholarship has come to believe that the Vita was not authored by the singing master, but by someone who joined Wilfrid in the last years of Wilfrid's life, not a close companion.

Wilfrid introduced the Rule of Saint Benedict into the monasteries he founded. It appears likely that he was the first to introduce the Benedictine Rule into England, as evidence is lacking that Augustine's monastery at Canterbury followed the Rule. He also was one of the first Anglo-Saxon bishops to record the gifts of land and property to his church, which he did at Ripon. Easter tables, used to calculate the correct date to celebrate Easter, were brought in from Rome, where the Dionysiac Easter tables had been recently introduced. He set up schools and became a religious advisor to the Northumbrian queen Æthelthryth, first wife of Ecgfrith. Æthelthryth donated the land at Hexham where Wilfrid founded a monastery and built a church using some recycled stones from the Roman town of Corbridge. When Wilfrid arrived in York as bishop, the cathedral's roof was on the point of collapse; he had it repaired and covered in lead, and had glass set in the windows.

The historian Barbara Yorke says of Wilfrid at this time that he "seems to have continued a campaign against any survival of 'Irish errors' and distrusted any communities that remained in contact with Iona or other Irish religious houses which did not follow the Roman Easter". He also worked to combat pagan practices, building a church at Melrose on a pagan site. Contemporaries said of him that he was the first native bishop to "introduce the Catholic way of life to the churches of the English". He did not neglect his pastoral duties in his diocese, making visits throughout the diocese to baptise and perform other episcopal functions, such as consecrating new churches. Some of the monasteries in his diocese were put under his protection by their abbots or abbesses, who were seeking someone to help protect their endowments. In ruling over such monasteries, Wilfrid may have been influenced by the Irish model of a group of monasteries all ruled by one person, sometimes while holding episcopal office.

Wilfrid was criticised for dressing his household and servants in clothing fit for royalty. He was accompanied on his travels by a retinue of warriors, one of whom, while at York, Wilfrid sent to abduct a young boy who had been promised to the church but whose family had changed their mind. Wilfrid also educated young men, both for clerical and secular careers.

== Expulsion ==
=== Dispute with the king ===
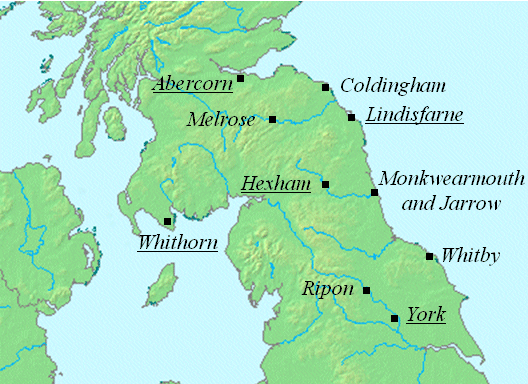
Map showing monasteries and bishoprics in Northumbria around 670. Bishoprics are underlined.

In 677 or 678, Wilfrid and Ecgfrith quarrelled, and Wilfrid was expelled from his see. Abbess Hilda of Whitby was a leader in a faction of the Northumbrian church that disliked Wilfrid, and her close ties with Theodore helped to undermine Wilfrid's position in Northumbria. Another contributory factor in Wilfrid's expulsion was his encouragement of Æthelthryth's entry into a nunnery; he had personally given her the veil, the ceremony of entering a nunnery, on her retirement to Ely Abbey. Æthelthryth had donated the lands Wilfrid used to found Hexham Abbey, and the historian N. J. Higham argues that they had been part of the queen's dower lands, which, when Ecgfrith remarried, his new queen wanted to recover. The historian Eric John feels that Wilfrid's close ties with the Mercian kingdom also contributed to his troubles with Egfrith, although John points out that these ties were necessary for Wilfrid's monastic foundations, some of which were in Mercia. Wilfrid not only lost his diocese, he lost control of his monasteries as well.

Theodore took advantage of the situation to implement decrees of some councils on dividing up large dioceses. Theodore set up new bishoprics from Wilfrid's diocese, with seats at York, Hexham, Lindisfarne, and one in the region of Lindsey. The Lindsey see was quickly absorbed by the Diocese of Lichfield, but the other three remained separate. The bishops chosen for these sees, Eata at Hexham, Eadhæd at Lindsey, and Bosa at York, had all either been supporters of the "Celtic" party at Whitby, or been trained by those who were. Eata had also been ejected from Ripon by Wilfrid. The new bishops were unacceptable to Wilfrid, who claimed they were not truly members of the Church because of their support for the "Celtic" method of dating Easter, and thus he could not serve alongside them. Another possible problem for Wilfrid was that the three new bishops did not come from Wilfrid's monastic houses nor from the communities where the bishops' seats were based. This was contrary to the custom of the time, which was to promote bishoprics from within the locality. Wilfrid's deposition became tangled up in a dispute over whether or not the Gregorian plan for Britain, with two metropolitan sees, the northern one set at York, would be followed through or abandoned. Wilfrid seems to have felt that he had metropolitan authority over the northern part of England, but Theodore never acknowledged that claim, instead claiming authority over the whole of the island of Britain.

=== Appeal to Rome ===
Wilfrid went to Rome after his expulsion to appeal against Theodore and Ecgfrith's decisions, the first Englishman to challenge a royal or ecclesiastical decision by petitioning the papacy. (Note: And he was the only English bishop to appeal a royal verdict to the papacy until 1088 when William de St-Calais appealed a decision of King William II of England to Rome.) On the way he stopped at the court of Aldgisl, the Frisian king in Utrecht for most of 678. Wilfrid had been blown off course on his trip from England to the continent, and ended up in Frisia according to some historians. Others state that he intended to journey via Frisia to avoid Neustria, whose Mayor of the Palace, Ebroin, disliked Wilfrid. He wintered in Frisia, avoiding the diplomatic efforts of Ebroin, who according to Stephen attempted to have Wilfrid killed. During his stay, Wilfrid attempted to convert the Frisians, who were still pagan at that time. Wilfrid's biographer says that most of the nobles converted, but the success was short-lived. After Frisia, he stopped at the court of Dagobert II in Austrasia, where the king offered Wilfrid the Bishopric of Strasbourg, which Wilfrid refused. Once in Italy, Wilfrid was received by Perctarit, a Lombard king, who gave him a place at his court.

Pope Agatho held a synod in October 679, which although it ordered Wilfrid's restoration and the return of the monasteries to his control, also directed that the new dioceses should be retained. Wilfrid was given the right to replace any bishop in the new dioceses to whom he objected. (Note: The copy of the decrees of Agatho has had interpolations added to it, partly to support the later Canterbury–York disputes over primacy that started under Archbishop Lanfranc after the Norman conquest of England. However, the Life of Wilfrid also confirms the basics of the council decrees, it is only in the decrees discussion of metropolitan status for Theodore that it is possibly corrupt.) The council had been called to deal with the Monothelete controversy, and Wilfrid's concerns were not the sole focus of the council. In fact, the historian Henry Chadwick thought that one reason Wilfrid secured the mostly favourable outcome was that Agatho wished for Wilfrid's support and testimony that the English Church was free of the monothelete heresy. Although Wilfrid did not win a complete victory, he did secure a papal decree limiting the number of dioceses in England to 12. Wilfrid also secured the right for his monasteries of Ripon and Hexham to be directly supervised by the pope, preventing any further interference in their affairs by the diocesan bishops.

Wilfrid returned to England after the council via Gaul. According to Stephen of Ripon, after the death of Dagobert II, Ebroin wished to imprison Wilfrid, but Wilfrid miraculously escaped. In 680, Wilfrid returned to Northumbria and appeared before a royal council. He produced the papal decree ordering his restoration, but was instead briefly imprisoned and then exiled by the king. Wilfrid stayed for a short time in the kingdom of the Middle Angles and at Wessex, but soon took refuge in Sussex with King Æthelwealh of Sussex.

== Missions in Sussex ==
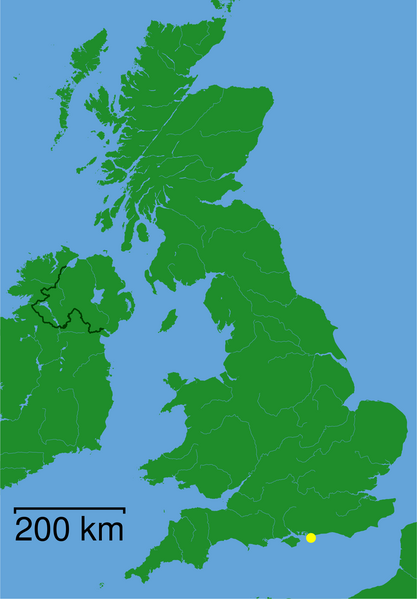
Map showing the location of Selsey

Wilfrid spent the next five years preaching to and converting the pagan inhabitants of Sussex, the South Saxons. He also founded Selsey Abbey, on an estate near Selsey of 87 hides, given to Wilfrid by Æthelwealh, king of the South Saxons. Bede attributes Wilfrid's ability to convert the South Saxons to his teaching them how to fish, and contrasts it with the lack of success of the Irish monk Dicuill. Bede also says that the Sussex area had been experiencing a drought for three years before Wilfrid's arrival, but miraculously when Wilfrid arrived, and started baptising converts, rain began to fall. Wilfrid worked with Bishop Erkenwald of London, helping to set up the church in Sussex. Erkenwald also helped reconcile Wilfrid and Theodore before Theodore's death in 690. The mission was jeopardised when King Æthelwealh died during an invasion of his kingdom by Cædwalla of Wessex. Wilfrid previously had contact with Cædwalla, and may have served as his spiritual advisor before Cædwalla's invasion of Sussex. After Æthelwealh's death and Cædwalla's accession to the throne of Wessex, Wilfrid became one of the new king's advisors, and the king was converted. Cædwalla confirmed Æthelwealh's grant of land in the Selsey area and Wilfrid built his cathedral church near the entrance to Pagham Harbour, believed to be what is now Church Norton.

Cædwalla sent Wilfrid to the Isle of Wight, which was still pagan, with the aim of converting the inhabitants. (Note: When Wilfrid returned to Northumbria, he gave the Wight mission to his nephew, Beornwine, who was not apparently an ordained priest.) The king also gave Wilfrid a quarter of the land on the island as a gift. In 688, the king relinquished his throne and went on a pilgrimage to Rome to be baptised, but died shortly after the ceremony. Wilfrid was probably influential in Cædwalla's decision to be baptised in Rome.

During his time in Sussex Wilfrid was reconciled with Archbishop Theodore; the Vita Sancti Wilfrithi says that Theodore expressed a desire for Wilfrid to succeed him at Canterbury. Wilfrid may have been involved in founding monasteries near Bath as well as in other parts of Sussex, but the evidence backing this is based on the wording used in the founding charters resembling wording used by Wilfrid in other charters, not on any concrete statements that Wilfrid was involved.

== Return to Northumbria and exile ==
=== Return from exile ===
In 686, Wilfrid was recalled to Northumbria after the death of Ecgfrith in battle with the Picts. During the 680s, Theodore had created two more dioceses in Northumbria, at Ripon, and at Abercorn in the Pictish kingdom, but both were short-lived. After Ecgfrith's death, Theodore wrote to the new king of Northumbria, Aldfrith, and to Æthelred, king of Mercia and the Abbess of Whitby, Ælfflæd, suggesting that an agreement be made allowing Wilfrid's return to Northumbria. Aldfrith agreed, Wilfrid returned to the north, and Bosa was removed from York. Wilfrid did not recover the whole of his previous bishopric, however, as Hexham and Lindisfarne remained separate sees. (Note: The only authority for the expulsion of Bosa is Stephen of Ripon's Vita Sancti Wilfrithi, and it is possible that Bosa was not expelled, as he was still bishop at his death in 706.)

Wilfrid appears to have lived at Ripon, and for a time he acted as administrator of the see of Lindisfarne after Cuthbert's death in 687. In 691, the subdivision issue arose once more, along with quarrels with King Aldfrith over lands, and attempts were made to make Wilfrid either give up all his lands or to stay confined to Ripon. A proposal to turn Ripon into a bishopric was also a source of dispute. When no compromise was possible, Wilfrid left Northumbria for Mercia, and Bosa was returned to York.

Something of the reception to Wilfrid's expulsion can be picked up in a Latin letter which has survived only in an incomplete quotation by William of Malmesbury in his Gesta pontificum Anglorum. We have it on William's authority that the letter was written by Aldhelm of Malmesbury and addressed to Wilfrid's abbots. In it, Aldhelm asks the clergymen to remember the exiled bishop "who, nourishing, teaching, reproving, raised you in fatherly love" and, appealing to lay aristocratic ideals of loyalty, urges them not to abandon their superior. Neither William nor the citation itself gives a date, but the letter has been assigned to Wilfrid's exile under Aldfrith in the 690s.

=== Mercia ===
During his stay in Mercia, Wilfrid acted as bishop with the consent of King Æthelred. Information on Wilfrid's life at this time is meagre, as the Vita Sancti Wilfrithi says little of this period. He is generally considered to have been Bishop of Leicester until about 706, when he is held to have been transferred to Hexham. Wilfrid became involved in the missionary efforts to the Frisians, which he had started in 678 during his stay in Frisia. Wilfrid helped the missionary efforts of Willibrord, which were more successful than his own earlier attempts. Willibrord was a monk of Ripon who was also a native of Northumbria.

Wilfrid was present at the exhumation of the body of Queen Æthelthryth at Ely Abbey in 695. He had been her spiritual adviser in the 670s and had helped the queen become a nun against the wishes of her husband, King Ecgfrith of Northumbria. The queen had joined Ely Abbey, where she died in 679. The ceremony in 695 found that her body had not decayed, which led to her being declared a saint. Wilfrid's testimony as to the character and virginity of Æthelthryth was recorded by Bede.

In about 700, Wilfrid appealed once more to Pope Sergius I over his expulsion from York, and the pope referred the issue back to a council in England. In 702, King Aldfrith held a council at Austerfield that upheld Wilfrid's expulsion, and once more Wilfrid travelled to Rome to appeal to the pope. The Vita Sancti Wilfrithi gives a speech, supposedly delivered by Wilfrid there, in defence of Wilfrid's record over the previous 40 years. The council was presided over by Berhtwald, the new archbishop of Canterbury, and the decision of the council was that Wilfrid should be deprived of all his monasteries but Ripon, and that he should cease to perform episcopal functions. When Wilfrid continued his appeal to the papacy, his opponents had him and his supporters excommunicated.

=== Rome and final return to Northumbria ===
On his way to Rome Wilfrid stopped in Frisia to visit Willibrord. Following Wilfrid's arrival in Rome Pope John VI held a council, which declared that the King of Northumbria should follow the earlier papal decrees restoring Wilfrid to his see. Wilfrid was disconcerted to find that the papal court spoke Greek, and his biographer noted that Wilfrid was displeased when the pope discussed the appeal with advisers in a language Wilfrid could not understand. The pope also ordered another council to be held in Britain to decide the issue, and ordered the attendance of Bosa, Berhtwald and Wilfrid. On his journey back to England, Wilfrid had a seizure at Meaux, but he had returned to Kent by 705.

Aldfrith died soon after Wilfrid's arrival back in England. The new king, Eadwulf, had been considered one of Wilfrid's friends, but after his accession to the throne, he ordered Wilfrid to stay out of Northumbria. Eadwulf's reign lasted only a few months before he was expelled to make way for Aldfrith's son Osred, to whom Wilfrid acted as spiritual adviser. Wilfrid may have been one of Osred's chief supporters, along with Oswiu's daughter Abbess Ælfflæd of Whitby, and the nobleman Beornhæth. Once Osred was secure on the throne Wilfrid was restored to Ripon and Hexham in 706. When Bosa of York died, Wilfrid did not contest the decision to appoint John of Beverley to York. This appointment meant John's transfer from Hexham, leaving Wilfrid free to perform episcopal functions at Hexham, which he did until his death.

== Other aspects ==
=== Cult of St Oswald ===
Sometime after the translation of the relics of Oswald of Northumbria to Bardney Abbey by Osthryth between 675 and 679, Wilfrid, along with Hexham Abbey, began to encourage and promote the cult of the dead king. Barbara Yorke sees this advocacy as a major factor in the prominence given to Oswald in Bede's Historia ecclesiastica gentis Anglorum. Historian D. P. Kirby regards Wilfrid's championing of Oswald as being a contributing factor in Wilfrid's expulsion from York in 678. Kirby believes that Ecgfrith felt Wilfrid was promoting Oswald's branch of the Northumbrian royal family over his own. One of Wilfrid's protégés, Willibrord, became a missionary to the Frisians in 695, perhaps inspired by Wilfrid's example. Willibrord may have felt it expedient to leave Northumbria, where he was known as one of Wilfrid's followers.

=== Monastic network ===
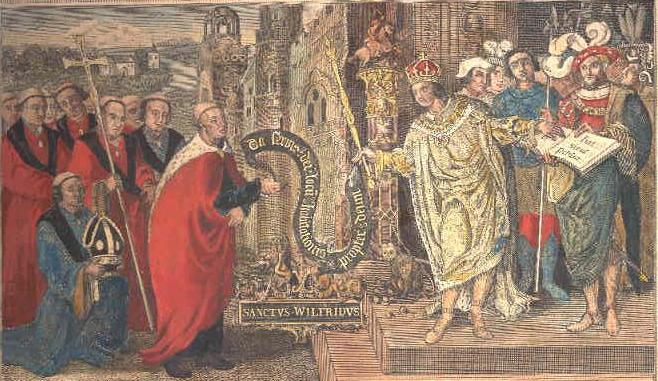
Later engraving of a picture commissioned in c.1533 showing Cædwalla confirming a grant of land, at Selsey, to Wilfrid

Wilfrid's network of monasteries extended across at least three of the kingdoms of England in his day. They included Hexham, Ripon, Selsey, and Oundle, as well as possibly Peterborough, Brixworth, Evesham, Wing, and Withington. At his monasteries and dioceses he built churches in a style akin to that of the continent and Rome, travelling between them with a large entourage of up to 120 followers. He made many contacts and friends, not only in Northumbria and the other English kingdoms, but also in Gaul, Frisia, and Italy. Nobles sent their sons to him for fostering, and Wilfrid was known to help his protégés, no matter if they became clerics or not. The historian Peter Brown speculated that one reason for Wilfrid's exile in 678 was that he was overshadowing the king as a patron. His contacts extended to the Lombard kingdom in Italy, where they included King Perctarit and his son Cunipert.

Wilfrid was a prolific founder of churches, which he then controlled until his death, and was a great fundraiser, acquiring lands and money from many of the kings he was in contact with. He was also noted for his ability to attract support from powerful women, especially queens. Queen Eanflæd, his first patron, introduced him to a number of helpful contacts, and he later attracted the support of Queen Æthelthryth, who gave the endowment for Hexham Abbey. Ælfflæd, sister of King Aldfrith of Northumbria and daughter of Wilfrid's old patron Queen Eanflæd, helped to persuade the Northumbrians to allow Wilfrid to return from his last exile.

=== Builder and artistic patron ===
Wilfrid built a church capable of accommodating a congregation of 2,000 at Hexham, using stone from Hadrian's Wall. The 12th-century writer Ailred of Rievaulx, whose family helped restore Hexham, credited Wilfrid as the designer of a church beautifully embellished with paintings and sculpture. It appears that the churches at Hexham and Ripon (which Wilfrid also built) were aisled basilicas, of the type that was common on the continent. Ripon was the first church in Northumbria to incorporate a porticus, similar to those of churches in Kent. 12th-century pilgrims' accounts declared that the church at Hexham rivalled those of Rome. The crypts at both Ripon and Hexham are unusual, and perhaps were intended by Wilfrid to mimic the Roman catacombs which he had seen on his travels. They are still extant, although the fabric of Wilfrid's churches above ground has been replaced by later structures. The churches were finished with glazed windows, made by glassmakers brought over from the continent.

As well as his building projects, Wilfrid also commissioned works to embellish the churches, including altar cloths made of silk woven with gold threads, and a gospel book written on parchment dyed purple, with gold lettering. The gospels were then enclosed in a gold book cover set with gems. When the church he had built at Ripon was consecrated, a three-day feast was held to accompany the ceremony. (Note: The book, which was given to Ripon, does not survive.)

== Resignation and death ==
After his final return to Northumbria Wilfrid retired to the monastery at Ripon, where he lived until his death during a visit to Oundle, at the age of 75. A little over a year before his death in either 709 or 710 (Note: Both years are given as death dates in sources. The discrepancy over his death date involves the fact that two dates were associated with Wilfrid's cult, 24 April and 12 October. Stephen of Ripon expressly states that Wilfrid died on a Thursday, and neither date in 709 was a Thursday. 24 April 710, however, was a Thursday, and is likely to be Wilfrid's death date. A complication is the fact that the October date is the more common commemoration date, but the April date is the one first associated with Wilfrid's cult, appearing in 7th- and 8th-century saints calendars. The October date probably arose because the April date conflicted with Lent and Easter.) Wilfrid suffered another stroke or seizure, which led him to make arrangements for the disposition of his monasteries and possessions. He was buried near the altar of his church in Ripon. Bede records the epitaph that was placed on the tomb. (Note: The epitaph is recorded in Book V, Chapter XIX. An online translation is at the Medieval Sourcebook, part of the Online Reference Book for Medieval Studies by the City University of New York.) Wilfrid was succeeded at Hexham by Acca of Hexham, a protégé who had accompanied him to Rome in 703. The monastery at Ripon celebrated the first anniversary of Wilfrid's death with a commemoration service attended by all the abbots of his monasteries and a spectacular white arc (Note: The historian Clare Stancliffe believes the white arc was actually a moonbow or "lunar rainbow". Using information on the years that a moonbow was most likely to occur, she establishes Thursday, 24 April 710, as the date of Wilfrid's death.) was said to have appeared in the sky starting from the gables of the basilica where his bones were laid to rest.

Wilfrid left large sums of money to his monastic foundations, enabling them to purchase royal favour. Soon after his death, a Vita Sancti Wilfrithi was written by Stephen of Ripon, a monk of Ripon. The first version appeared in about 715 followed by a later revision in the 730s, the first biography written by a contemporary to appear in England. It was commissioned by two of Wilfrid's followers, Acca of Hexham, and the Abbot of Ripon, Tatbert. Stephen's Vita is concerned with vindicating Wilfrid and making a case for his sainthood, and so is used with caution by historians, although it is nevertheless an invaluable source for Wilfrid's life and the history of the time.

== Legacy ==
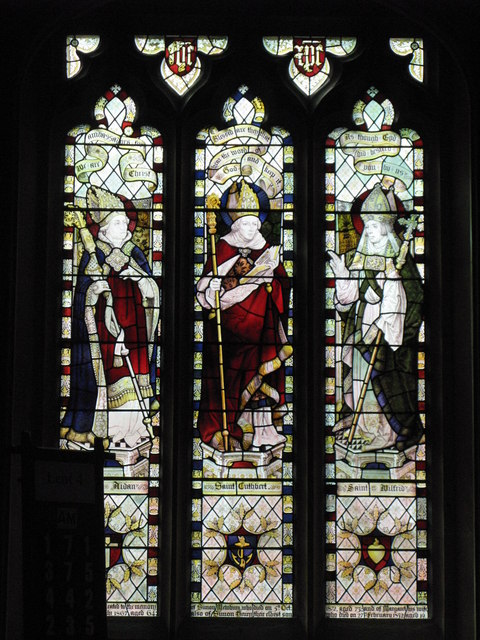
Wilfrid (right), with saints Cuthbert (centre) and Aidan (left), depicted in a stained-glass window in the church of St John Lee near Acomb in Northumberland; Hexham Abbey is nearby.

Wilfrid's feast day is 12 October or 24 April. Both dates were celebrated in early medieval England, but the April date appeared first in the liturgical calendars. The April date is the date when his relics were translated to a new shrine. Immediately after his death Wilfrid's body was venerated as a cult object, and miracles were alleged to have happened at the spot where the water used to wash his body was discarded. A cult grew up at Ripon after his death and remained active until 948, when King Eadred destroyed the church at Ripon; after the destruction, Wilfrid's relics were taken by Archbishop Oda of Canterbury, and held in Canterbury Cathedral. This account appears in a foreword written by Oda for Frithegod's later poem on Wilfrid's life. However, according to Byrhtferth's Vita Sancti Oswaldi, or Life of Saint Oswald, Oda's nephew, Oswald, Archbishop of York, preserved the relics at Ripon and restored the community there to care for them. The two differing accounts are not easily reconciled, but it is possible that Oswald collected secondary relics that had been overlooked by his uncle and installed those at Ripon. (Note: The early 12th century writer Eadmer, who wrote a Vita Sancti Wilfrithi, took this approach to the problem of the differing accounts of Wilfrid's relics, and appears to have been the first writer to suggest this solution.) The relics that were held at Canterbury were originally placed in the High Altar in 948, but after the fire at Canterbury Cathedral in 1067, Wilfrid's relics were placed in their own shrine.

After the Norman Conquest of England, devotion continued to be paid to Wilfrid, with 48 churches dedicated to him and relics distributed between 11 sites. During the 19th century, the feast of Wilfrid was celebrated on the Sunday following Lammas in the town of Ripon with a parade and horse racing, a tradition which continued until at least 1908. Wilfrid is venerated in the Roman Catholic Church, Eastern Orthodox Church and the Anglican Communion. He is usually depicted either as a bishop preaching and baptising or else as a robed bishop holding an episcopal staff.

Wilfrid was one of the first bishops to bring relics of saints back from Rome. The papacy was trying to prevent the removal of actual body parts from Rome, restricting collectors to things that had come in contact with the bodily remains, such as dust and cloth. Wilfrid was known as an advocate of Benedictine monasticism, and regarded it as a tool in his efforts to "root out the poisonous weeds planted by the Scots". He built at Ripon and Hexham, and lived a majestic lifestyle. As a result of his various exiles, he founded monastic communities that were widely scattered over the British Isles, over which he kept control until his death. These monastic foundations, especially Hexham, contributed to the blending of the Gaelic and Roman strains of Christianity in Northumbria, which inspired a great surge of learning and missionary activity; Bede and Alcuin were among the scholars who emerged from Northumbrian monasteries influenced by Wilfrid. Missionaries inspired by his example went from Northumbria to the continent, where they converted pagans in Germany and elsewhere.

One commentator has said that Wilfrid "came into conflict with almost every prominent secular and ecclesiastical figure of the age". Hindley, a historian of the Anglo-Saxons, states that "Wilfrid would not win his sainthood through the Christian virtue of humility". The historian Barbara Yorke said of him that "Wilfrid's character was such that he seems to have been able to attract and infuriate in equal measure". His contemporary, Bede, although a partisan of the Roman dating of Easter, was a monk and always treats Wilfrid a little uneasily, showing some concern about how Wilfrid conducted himself as a clergyman and as a bishop. The historian Eric John feels that it was Wilfrid's devotion to monasticism that led him to believe that the only way for the Church to be improved was through monasticism. John traces Wilfrid's many appeals to Rome to his motivation to hold together his monastic empire, rather than to self-interest. John also challenges the belief that Wilfrid was fond of pomp, pointing out that the comparison between the Irish missionaries who walked and Wilfrid, who rode, ignores the reality that the quickest method of travel in the Middle Ages was on horseback.

The historian Peter Hunter Blair summarises Wilfrid's life as follows: "Wilfrid left a distinctive mark on the character of the English church in the seventh century. He was not a humble man, nor, so far as we can see, was he a man greatly interested in learning, and perhaps he would have been more at home as a member of the Gallo-Roman episcopate where the wealth which gave him enemies in England would have passed unnoticed and where his interference in matters of state would have been less likely to take him to prison." R. W. Southern, another modern historian, says that Wilfrid was "the greatest papal enthusiast of the century". James Campbell, a historian specialising in the Anglo-Saxon period, said of him "He was certainly one of the greatest ecclesiastics of his day. Ascetic, deemed a saint by some, the founder of several monasteries according to the rule of St Benedict, he established Christianity in Sussex and attempted to do so in Frisia. At the same time, his life and conduct were in some respects like those of a great Anglo-Saxon nobleman."

== Citations ==
Christian titles
Preceded by Chad of Mercia	Bishop of the Northumbrians; 664–678	Succeeded by Bosa as Bishop of York
Preceded by Chad of Mercia	Bishop of the Northumbrians; 664–678	Succeeded by Eata of Hexham as Bishop of Lindisfarne
Preceded by Cuthwine of Leicester	Bishop of Leicester; 692–705	Succeeded by Headda
Preceded by John of Beverley	Bishop of Hexham; 705–709	Succeeded by Acca
