= Sulpicius Severus =

Christian writer and historian (c. 363 – c. 425)

Sulpicius Severus (/sʌlˈpɪʃəs ˈsɛvərəs/; c. 363 – c. 425) was a Christian writer and native of Aquitania, in what is now France. He is known for his chronicle of sacred history, as well as his biography of Saint Martin of Tours.

== Life ==
Almost all that is known of Severus' life comes from a few allusions in his own writings, some passages in the letters of his friend Paulinus, bishop of Nola, and a short biography by the historian Gennadius of Massilia.

Born of noble parents in Aquitaine, Severus enjoyed excellent educational advantages. He was imbued with the culture of his time and of his country, which was a centre of Latin letters and learning. He studied jurisprudence in Burdigala (modern Bordeaux) and was renowned as an eloquent lawyer; his knowledge of Roman law is reflected in parts of his writings. He married the daughter of a wealthy consular family, who died young, leaving him no children.

At this time Severus came under the powerful influence of Saint Martin, bishop of Tours, by whom he was led to devote his wealth to the Christian poor, and his own powers to a life of good works and the contemplative vision of God. This choice incurred his father's displeasure, but he was encouraged in his determination by his mother-in-law. To use the words of his friend Paulinus, he broke with his father, followed Christ, and set the teachings of the "fishermen" far above all his "Tullian learning." His ordination as a priest is vouched for by Gennadius, but no details of his priestly activity have survived. He is said to have been led away in his old age by Pelagianism, but to have repented and inflicted long-enduring penance on himself. His time was passed chiefly in the neighbourhood of Toulouse, and such literary efforts as he indulged in were made in the interests of Christianity.

Severus, the scholar and orator, well versed in the ways of the world, was very unlike Martin, the rough Pannonian bishop, monastic life, seer and supposed worker of miracles. Martin, however, had a strong influence on Severus. Thus, the works of Severus are important because they reflect the ideas, influence and aspirations of Martin, the foremost ecclesiastic of 4th-century Gaul.

== Works ==
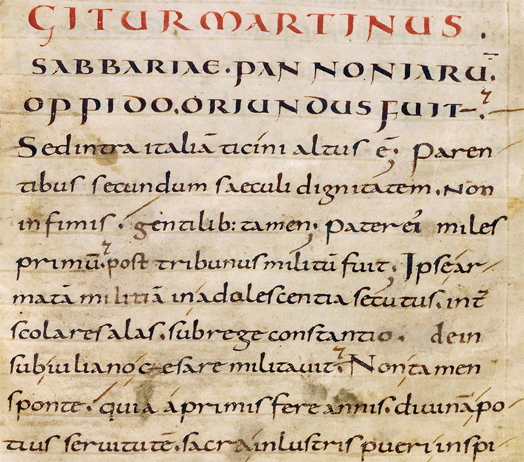
Page from the Vita Sancti Martini by Sulpicius Severus, written in Carolingian minuscule. Bibliothèque nationale de France.

=== Chronicle ===
The chief work of Severus is the Chronicle (Chronica, Chronicorum Libri duo or Historia sacra, c. 403), a summary of sacred history from the beginning of the world to his own times, with the omission of the events recorded in the Gospels and the Acts, "lest the form of his brief work should detract from the honour due to those events". It is a source of primary importance for the history of Priscillianism and contains considerable information respecting the Arian controversy. The book was a textbook and was used as such in the schools of Europe for about a century and a half after the editio princeps was published by Flacius Illyricus in 1556.

Severus nowhere clearly points to the class of readers for whom his book is designed. He disclaims the intention of making his work a substitute for the actual narrative contained in the Bible. "Worldly historians" had been used by him, he says, to make clear the dates and the connexion of events and for supplementing the sacred sources, and with the intent at once to instruct the unlearned and to "convince" the learned. Probably the "unlearned" are the mass of Christians and the learned are the cultivated Christians and pagans alike, to whom the crude language of the sacred texts, whether in Greek or Latin, would be distasteful. The literary structure of the narrative shows that Severus had in his mind principally readers on the same level of culture with himself. He was anxious to show that sacred history might be presented in a form which lovers of Sallust and Tacitus could appreciate and enjoy. The style is lucid, almost classical. Edward Gibbon remarked: "The Life of St. Martin, and the Dialogues concerning his miracles, contain facts adapted to the grossest barbarism, in a style not unworthy of the Augustan age. So natural is the alliance between good taste and good sense, that I am always astonished by this contrast." In order that his work might fairly stand beside that of the old Latin writers, Severus ignored the allegorical approach to interpreting sacred history that had been favoured by both heretics and the orthodox of his age.

As an authority on the period prior to his own, Severus offers few guarantees and rarely corrects or supplements the historical record transmitted thanks to other sources. Jakob Bernays suggested that he based his narrative of the destruction of Jerusalem by Titus on the account given by Tacitus in his Histories, a portion of which has been lost. In his allusions to the Gentile rulers with whom the Jews came into contact from the time of the Maccabees onwards, Severus discloses some points which are not without importance.

The real interest of Severus' work lies, first, in the incidental glimpses it affords all through the history of his own time; next and more particularly, in the information he has preserved concerning the struggle over the Priscillianist heresy, which disorganised and degraded the churches of Spain and Gaul, and particularly affected Aquitaine. The sympathies here betrayed by Severus are wholly those of St. Martin. The bishop had withstood Maximus, who ruled for some years a large part of the western portion of the empire, though he never conquered Italy. He had reproached him with attacking and overthrowing his predecessors on the throne, and for his dealings with the church. Severus loses no opportunity for laying stress on the crimes and follies of rulers, and on their cruelty, though he once declares that, cruel as rulers could be, priests could be crueller still. This last statement has reference to the bishops who had left Maximus no peace till he had stained his hands with the blood of Priscillian and his followers. Martin, too, had denounced the worldliness and greed of the Gaulish bishops and clergy. Accordingly, in narrating the division of Canaan among the tribes, Severus calls the special attention of ecclesiastics to the fact that no portion of the land was assigned to the tribe of Levi, lest they should be hindered in their service of God. "Our clergy seem", he says, "not merely forgetful of the lesson, but ignorant of it, such a passion for possessions has in our days fastened like a pestilence on their souls." Chisholm explains that in Severus's writings it is possible to glimpse the circumstances which were winning over good men to monasticism in the West, though the evidence of an enthusiastic votary of the solitary life, such as Severus was, is probably not free from exaggeration. Severus also fully sympathised with the action of St. Martin touching Priscillianism. This mysterious Western offshoot of Gnosticism had no single feature about it which could soften the hostility of a character such as Martin's, but he resisted the introduction of secular punishment for evil doctrine, and withdrew from communion with those bishops in Gaul, a large majority, who invoked the aid of Maximus against their erring brethren. In this connection, the account given by Severus of the Council of Rimini in 359, where the question arose whether the bishops attending the assembly might lawfully receive money from the imperial treasury to recoup their travelling and other expenses, is notable. Severus evidently approved the action of the British and Gaulish bishops, who deemed it unbecoming that they should lie under pecuniary obligation to the emperor. His ideal of the church required that it should stand clear and above the state.

=== Life of St. Martin, dialogues, and letters ===
More popular during the Middle Ages was Severus' Life of St. Martin, as were also the dialogues and letters which relate to the same subject. These works did much to establish the great reputation which Martin maintained throughout the Middle Ages. The book is not properly a biography, but a catalogue of miracles, told in all the simplicity of absolute belief. The power to work miraculous signs is assumed to be in direct proportion to holiness, and is by Severus valued merely as an evidence of holiness, which he is persuaded can only be attained through a life of isolation from the world. In the first of his Dialogues (fair models of Cicero), Severus puts into the mouth of an interlocutor (Posthumianus) a pleasing description of the life of coenobites and solitaries in the deserts bordering on Egypt. The main evidence of the virtue attained by them lies in the voluntary subjection to them of the savage beasts among which they lived. But Severus was no indiscriminating adherent of monasticism. The same dialogue shows him to be alive to its dangers and defects. The second dialogue is a large appendix to the Life of St. Martin, and really supplies more information on his life as bishop and on his views than the work which bears the title Vita S. Martini. The two dialogues occasionally make interesting references to personages of the epoch. In Dial. 1, cc. 6, 7, a vivid picture is given of the controversies which raged at Alexandria over the works of Origen. The judgement of Severus himself is no doubt that which he puts in the mouth of his interlocutor Posthumianus: "I am astonished that one and the same man could have so far differed from himself that in the approved portion of his works he has no equal since the apostles, while in that portion for which he is justly blamed it is proved that no man has committed more unseemly errors." Three Epistles on the death of Martin (ad Eusebium, ad Aurelium diaconum, ad Bassulam) complete the list of Severus' genuine works. Other letters (to his sister), on the love of God and the renunciation of the world, have not survived.

=== Spurious attributions ===
Beside the above-mentioned three letters, seven others have been attributed to Severus. These are rejected as spurious by some critics, whilst the authenticity of the first two is admitted by others. The World Chronicle of the so-called Sulpicius Severus has nothing to do with the subject of this biography; it was written in Spain in the sixth century.

== Sources ==
The text of the Chronicle rests on a single 11th-century manuscript, one of the Palatine collection now in the Vatican; of the other works manuscripts are abundant, the best being one of the 6th century at Verona. Some spurious letters bear the name of Severus; also in a manuscript at Madrid is a work falsely professing to be an epitome of the Chronicle of Severus, and going down to 511. The chief editions of the complete works of Severus are those by De Prato (Verona, 1741) and by Halm (forming volume i. of the Corpus scriptorum ecclesiasticorum Latinorum, Vienna, 1866). There is a most admirable monograph on the Chronicle by J. Bernays (Berlin, 1861). See also Goelzer, Grammaticae in Sulp. Severum observationes (1884) (thesis).

== Bibliography ==
Severus' works are to be found in P.L. 20, 95-248; later edition by Karl Halm, Opera, CSEL 1 (Vienna, 1866) (on Google Books)

- Bernays, Jacob (1861). Ueber die Chronik des Sulpicius Severus. Ein Beitrag zur Geschichte der klassischen und biblischen Studien [About the Chronicle of Sulpicius Severus. A Contribution to the History of Classical and Biblical Studies] (in German). Berlin: Wilhelm Herz.
- Bardenhewer, Otto (1908). Patrology: The Lives and Works of the Fathers of the Church. Translated by Thomas Joseph Shahan. B. Herder. pp. 451–453. ISBN 978-1-4699-8884-9.
- Bennett, S.A. (1911). "Severus (18) Sulpicius". In Henry Wace; William Coleman Piercy; Sir William Smith (eds.). A dictionary of Christian biography and literature to the end of the sixth century, A.D., with an account of the principal sects and heresies. London: Murray. p. 894.
- Goodrich, Richard J. (2015). Sulpicius Severus: The Complete Works. Introduction, Translation, and Notes. New York: Paulist Press.
- Stancliffe, Clare (1983). St. Martin and His Hagiographer: History and Miracle in Sulpicius Severus. Oxford: Clarendon Press. ISBN 978-0-19-821895-1.
- van Andel, G. K. (1976). The Christian Concept of History in the Chronicle of Sulpicius Severus. Amsterdam: Adolf M. Hakkert. ISBN 978-90-256-0722-7.

== See also ==
- Sulpicia (gens)
- Louroux Priory
