= Bosa of York =

7th and 8th-century Archbishop of York and saint

Saint Bosa
- Bishop of York
- Appointed: 678 (first appointment); 691 (second appointment)
- Term ended: 687 (first tenure) c. 705 (second tenure)
- Predecessor: Wilfrid
- Successor: John of Beverley

Orders
- Consecration: 678

Personal details
- Born: unknown
- Died: c. 705

Sainthood
- Feast day: 9 March
- Venerated in: Catholic Church; Eastern Orthodox Church; Anglican Communion

Bosa (died c. 705) was an Anglo-Saxon Bishop of York during the 7th and early 8th centuries. He was educated at Whitby Abbey, where he became a monk. Following Wilfrid's removal from York in 678 the diocese was divided into three, leaving a greatly reduced see of York, to which Bosa was appointed bishop. He was himself removed in 687 and replaced by Wilfrid, but in 691 Wilfrid was once more ejected and Bosa returned to the see. He died in about 705, and subsequently appears as a saint in an 8th-century liturgical calendar.

== Life ==
Bosa was a Northumbrian, educated at Whitby Abbey under the abbess Hilda. He subsequently joined the monastery as a monk, and became one of five men educated at Whitby who went on to become bishops. (Note: The other four were Oftfor, Ætla, John of Beverley, and Wilfrid II.)

In 678, after Wilfrid was removed from the bishopric of York and banished from Northumbria, the diocese of York was divided into three. Bosa was appointed to the now greatly reduced diocese of York, which included the sub-kingdom of Deira, thanks to the support of King Ecgfrith of Northumbria and Theodore of Tarsus, the Archbishop of Canterbury. (Note: Theodore initially split the diocese into two bishoprics; the newly created Bernicia was given to Eata, while Bosa became bishop of the greatly reduced diocese of York. Bernicia had two episcopal sees, one at Hexham and the other at Lindisfarne. Eata was bishop of the whole of Bernicia for three years, after which Bernicia was itself divided: the see of Hexham was assigned to Trumbert, and Lindisfarne to Eata.) Bosa was consecrated in his cathedral at York in 678 by Theodore, but Wilfrid declared that he was unable to work with Bosa because he did not consider him to be a member of the Catholic Church. Bosa's episcopate lasted nine years, but with Wilfrid back in favour, in 687 Bosa was removed just as his predecessor had been. He returned to York in 691, after Wilfrid was once again expelled. While bishop, Bosa introduced a communal life for the clergy of the cathedral, and set up a continuous liturgy in the cathedral.

== Death and legacy ==
The date of Bosa's death is unknown; he was still alive in 704 but must have died before 706, when his successor was named. His successor at York was John of Beverley, the Bishop of Hexham. A contemporary writer, Bede, praised Bosa as a man of "singular merit and sanctity". Bede also praised Bosa's humility. Bosa was also responsible for the early education of Acca, later Bishop of Hexham, who grew up in his household.

Bosa appears as a saint in an 8th-century liturgical calendar from York, the only sign that he was venerated as a saint before the Norman Conquest of England. The 16th-century English antiquary John Leland included Bosa in his list of saint's resting places in England, giving it as York. Bosa's feast day is 9 March. He is venerated as a Saint in the Eastern Orthodox Church on the same date.

== Citations ==
Christian titles
| Preceded by Wilfrid | Bishop of York; 678–687 | Succeeded by Wilfrid |
| Preceded by Wilfrid | Bishop of York; 691–c. 705 | Succeeded by John of Beverley |
