= Frithegod =

10th-century poet and clergyman

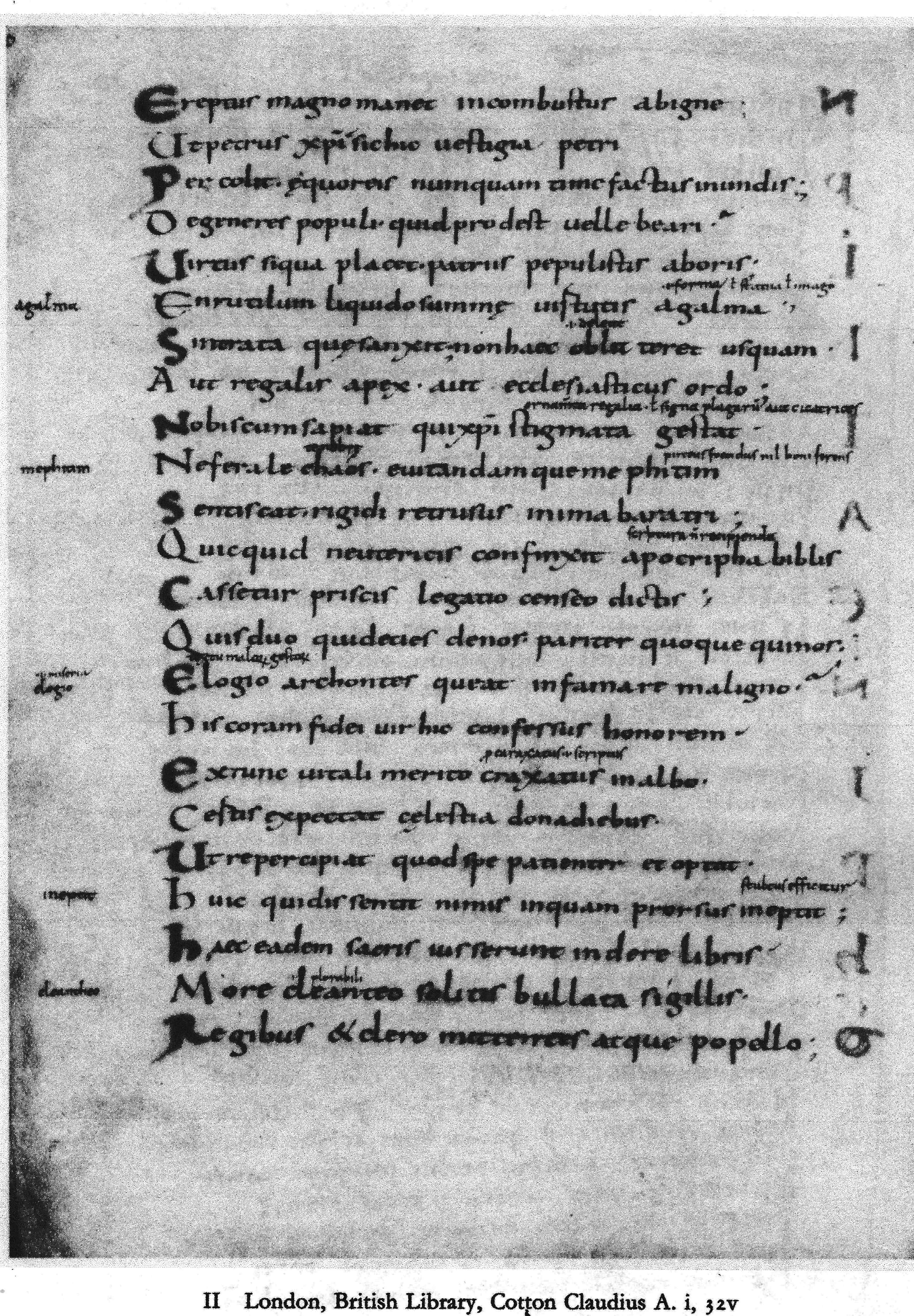
London, British Library, Cotton Claudius A. i, 32v, a sheet from Frithegod's poem Breuiloquium uitae Wilfridi, possibly in his own hand made in the mid-10th century.

Frithegod, (Note: Sometimes Frithegode; Fredegaud, Fredegaud of Brioude, or Frithegod of Canterbury.) (flourished circa (c.) 950 to c. 958) was a poet and clergyman in the mid 10th-century who served Oda of Canterbury, an Archbishop of Canterbury. As a non-native of England, he came to Canterbury and entered Oda's service as a teacher and scholar. After Oda's death he likely returned to the continent. His most influential writing was a poem on the life of Wilfrid, an 8th-century bishop and saint, named Breviloquium Vitae Wilfridi. Several manuscripts of this poem survive, as well as a few other of Frithegod's poems. He was also known for the complexity of his writings, with one historian even calling the Breviloquium "damnably difficult".

== Life ==
Frithegod was probably a native of France, as his name is obviously not Anglo-Saxon, and was probably an attempt to Anglicize the Frankish name Fredegaud. He may have originated near La Chaise-Dieu in Aquitaine, as he seems to have returned there late in his life, but this is just a theory with no solid proof. We do not know when he entered the clergy, or when he was ordained a deacon, just the fact that he held that office.

It is not clear when he met Oda. It may have been in 936, when Oda visited France. He went to Canterbury after meeting Oda, where he served Oda as one of the teachers of Oda's nephew Oswald of Worcester. He also wrote poems while at Canterbury.

After Oda's death in 958 Frithegod probably returned to the continent and went to the canonry of Brioude in Auvergne.

== Writings ==
=== Breviloquium ===
Frithegod is generally known for his Latin poem Breviloquium Vitae Wilfridi, a hexameter work based on Stephen of Ripon's prose Life of St Wilfrid. The subject of both Frithegod and Stephen's works was Wilfrid, a late 7th and early 8th-century bishop and saint. Oda ordered the Breviloquium to commemorate Oda's securing of Wilfrid's relics around 950. Preceding the poem is a prose description of the actual acquisition, supposedly written by Oda, but more probably, on the basis of the writing style, written by Frithegod. The historian Michael Lapidge describes the Breviloquium as "one of the most brilliantly ingenious – but also damnably difficult – Latin products of Anglo-Saxon England", which "may be dubiously described as the 'masterpiece' of Anglo-Latin hermeneutic style". Another scholar, Rose Graham, characterised his style as "long-winded and pretentious".

The Breviloquium is 1400 lines and its meaning is not always clear, even when compared to the Life of St Wilfrid which was its basis. The poem adds nothing new to historian's knowledge of Wilfrid, and in Lapidge's view its sole purpose was to "demonstrate [Frithegod's] poetic skill which, in the mid-tenth century, was unparalleled elsewhere in England". Another reason for having both a verse and a prose life of a particular saint is given by the medieval scholar Alcuin, where he said that prose lives were meant to be read aloud to a monastic community, but that verses were to be used by individual monks for meditation and study. The Breviloquium contains a number of neologisms and Greek words, the rarity of some of which imply that Frithegod had some knowledge of the Greek language. The Breviloquium was influenced by Biblical hermeneutics, a type of study of biblical texts. The medieval scholar Eadmer, who used the poem on Wilfrid in his own works, said that the original poem was too full of Greek words to be read very often.

A modern edition of the Breviloquium was published in 1950. The historian Richard Gameson suggested that the copy of the Breviloquium in the Cotton Library as Claudius A.i on folios 5–36 was written by Frithegod himself, as it is in a mid-10th-century continental minuscule scribal hand, rather than the different English style of the Canterbury scriptorium. Besides the Cotton Library manuscript, two other manuscripts of the work exist. One is in Leningrad, catalogued as Public Library, 0. v. XIV, and the other is in Paris, in the Bibliotheque Nationale with the catalogue of lat. 8431. All three manuscripts probably date from the mid-10th century and were likely produced while Frithegod was still in Canterbury. They have glosses throughout, although most of the notations are in the Latin language rather than Old English.

A prose preface to the Breviloquium exists, written in much the same dense style. It is claimed to have been written by Oda, although Lapidge suggests that it is possible that Frithegod wrote the preface also and ascribed it to his patron.

=== Other works ===
Frithegod wrote a number of other works, not all of which survive to the present day. A 16th-century antiquary, John Bale, knew of a manuscript that contained, besides the Breviloquium, a work on the life of St Ouen – whose relics Oda had also acquired, two poems, another work entitled De Visione Beatorum, and a work given the title of Contemplationes Variae. Although the Life of Ouen and the two named works do not survive, the two poems do in other manuscripts.

The two poems are both contained in a manuscript now in the Trinity College Dublin library, under catalogue number 174. Each poem is also included in other manuscripts. The first poem, Ciues caelestis patriae, is in Cambridge University Library catalogue Gg.5.35. The other, Dum pietas multimoda, is in several manuscripts, including two in Vatican City in the Bibliotheca Apostolica Vaticana under catalogues Borgiano lat. 359 and Reg. lat. 301. Another copy is in Orléans in the Bibliothèque municipale as catalogue 347. This poem or hymn is designed for use in the foot-washing religious ceremony that traditionally took place on Maundy Thursday.
