= William Ketel =

11th and 12th-century English writer and clergyman

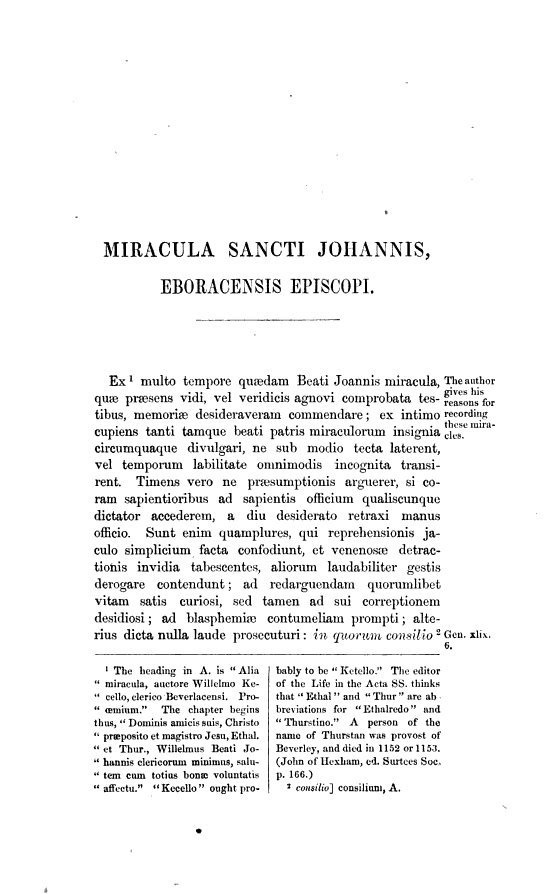
William Ketel's "Miracles of Saint John"

William Ketel (floruit c. 1100) was a medieval English writer and clergyman. Little is known about the author, but his work survives in a transcription of a now-lost manuscript. The composition was a compilation of miracles relating to Saint John of Beverley as well as his cult. Most of the stories are known from other works, and the main historical value of Ketel's compilation lies in its information on the growth of the saint's cult and of Beverley Minster. The collection has been published as part of the Rolls Series.

== Life ==
The name "Ketel" was originally "Ketill", is of Scandinavian origin, and was common in the eastern section of England. Ketel was active around 1100 and is possibly the author of a work containing miraculous stories about Saint John of Beverley. From the dedication of the work, Ketel appears to have been a clerk of Beverley Minster.

== Work on John of Beverley ==
The actual manuscript of the work has been lost, but it was transcribed before it was lost and the transcription formed the basis for the edition printed in the 17th century Acta Sanctorum. Ketel was also mentioned in John Leland's work Commentarii de Scriptoribus Britannicis, John Bale's work Scriptorum illustrium majoris Britanniae Catalogus, and Thomas Tanner's work Bibliotheca Britannico-Hibernica.

The original manuscript of Ketel's work was included with Folcard's Life of St John Beverley, following after the conclusion of that work. Ketel's work was in two parts – the first was preceded by the dedication, and the second by an interjection of surprise that only "William, who is also called Ketel" had bothered to relate the miracles of St John. Both sections contain listings of miracle stories concerning John of Beverley. Although most of these stories are known from two other manuscripts, (Note: One is a 12th-century manuscript now in the Cotton Library as Cotton MS Faustina B.iv. and the other is a 15th-century manuscript now in the British Library as Add. MS 61901.) neither mentions Ketel as the author. Ketel's tract is the earliest mention of King Æthelstan's visit to Beverley. Beyond that fact, and information about the growth of Beverley Minster and John's saintly cult, historians have found his writings to be of little historical value. Ketel does relate that he has either personal knowledge of the miracles, or that he had good reasons to trust those who told them to him.

The dedication of Ketel's work contains references to the writer as "William, least of the clerks of St John" (in the dedication), and as William "who is also called Ketel" in the introduction to the second set of miracles. The dedication also refers to two of the writer's fellow clergy as "Ethal." and "Thur.", and states they held the office of provost and master respectively. The "Thur." may be Thurstan, who was provost of Beverley Minster from around 1135 to 1152. If this is the case, this would date Ketel's work to the first half of the 12th century. The fact that the last datable event mentioned in the work is from the reign of William the Conqueror fits in with this possible dating. It is also possible that Ketel wrote late in the 11th century, if the two clerks mentioned in the dedication are two otherwise unknown officials of Beverley. The parallels in word choice between Ketel's work and the work of Alfred of Beverly, who wrote around 1143, are probably due to Alfred using Ketel's writings. There is a reference in the stories to John's "former tomb", which likely refers to the erecting of a new tomb to the saint in 1197, and are most probably later insertions into the manuscript.

== Publication ==
The work has been edited and published by James Raine as Vita S. Iohannis Eboracensis archiepiscopi in volume 71 of the Rolls Series.
