= Godfrey of Cambrai =

Godfrey of Cambrai (also known as Godfrey of Winchester) was the prior of Winchester Abbey from 1082 until his death in 1107. When he joined the Benedictine community around 1070 he was probably around 15 years old. He also was a composer of poems, writing ecclesiastics and eulogies of English kings, and a book of moral epigrams in the style of Martial. Godfrey's genuine works were later often confused with those of Martial's.

His work enjoyed considerable popularity in the century after his death and beyond. One of his poems is included in Carmina Burana. Twenty-one manuscripts of his works survive.

He was popular, under his own name and erroneously under Martial's, during the Italian Renaissance.
