= Vita Sancti Cuthberti =

- "The Life of St Cuthbert"
- Also known as: Vita sancti Cuthberti auctore anonymo
- Author(s): Anonymous
- Patron: Eadfrith, bishop of Lindisfarne (698–721)
- Language: Latin
- Date: 699 × 705
- Provenance: Lindisfarne monastery
- State of existence: Eight manuscripts
- Bayerische Staatsbibliothek, Clm. 15817
- St Omer 267
- St Omer 715
- Arras 812 (1029)
- British Library Harley MS 2800
- Brussels Royal Library MSS 207–208
- Trier, Public Library 1151
- Paris, Bibliothèque Nationale, Fonds Latin 5289
- First printed edition: The Bollandists, Acta Sanctorum Martii, vol. iii, (Antwerp, 1668), pp. 117–24
- Genre: prose hagiography
- Subject: Cuthbert, bishop of Lindisfarne and Anglo-Saxon saint (died 687)
- Setting: Northumbria
- Period covered: 7th century

The Vita Sancti Cuthberti (English: "Life of Saint Cuthbert") is a prose hagiography from early medieval Northumbria. It is probably the earliest extant saint's life from Anglo-Saxon England and is an account of the life and miracles of Cuthbert (died 687), a Bernician hermit-monk who became bishop of Lindisfarne. Surviving in eight manuscripts from Continental Europe, it was not as well read in the Middle Ages as the prose version by Bede. It was however Bede's main source for his two dedicated works on Cuthbert, the "Metrical Life" and the "Prose Life".

It was completed soon after the translation of Cuthbert's body in 698, at some point between 699 and 705. Compiled from oral sources available in Bernicia at the time of its composition, the Vita nonetheless utilized previous Christian writing from the Continent, particularly Gregory the Great's Dialogi and Sulpicius Severus' Vita Sancti Martini, as powerful influences. The name of the author is not known, though he was a monk of the monastery of Lindisfarne. It is often called the Anonymous Life to distinguish it from the "Prose Life" and the "Metrical Life" of Bede. There are four modern editions of the Anonymous Life, the latest by historian Bertram Colgrave.

== Background and sources ==
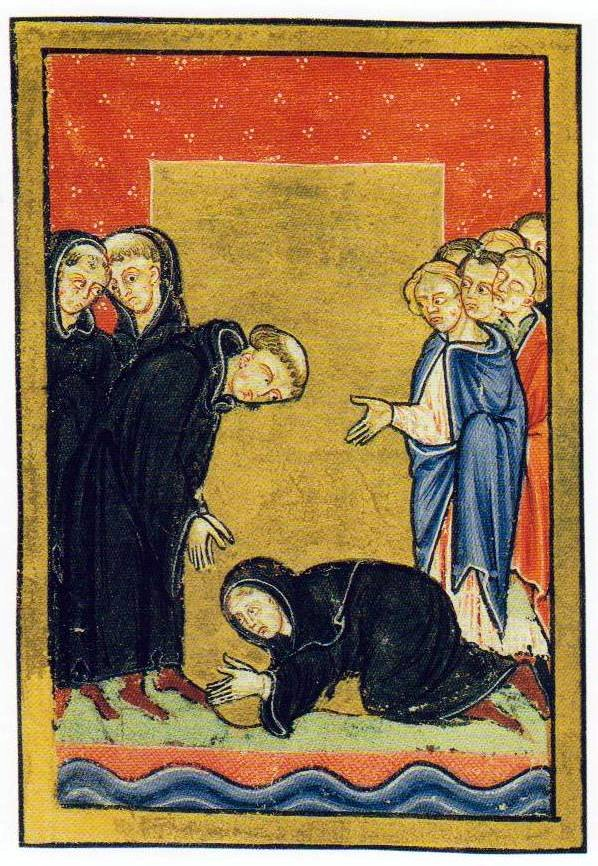
Ælfflæd of Whitby, sister of the king, meeting Cuthbert on Coquet Island; from British Library Yates Thomson MS 26 version of Bede's Prose Life, prophecy is in the Anonymous Life at iii.6

Written just after or possibly contemporarily with Adomnán's Vita Sancti Columbae ("Life of Saint Columba"), the Anonymous Life is the first piece of Northumbrian Latin writing and the earliest piece of English Latin hagiography. This is an honour sometimes given to the anonymous Vita of Gregory the Great written at Whitby, though the date of 710 attributed to the latter by historian R. C. Love (in contrast to a date between 680 and 704) makes it later than the Anonymous Life of Cuthbert.

The work is an account of the life and miracles of Cuthbert (Old English: Cuðberht), sometime Melrose monk, hermit of Farne and bishop of Lindisfarne who died on 20 March 687. In common with Irish saints of the period, the Anonymous Life depicts the Bernician saint in the mold of Martin, bishop of Tours (died 397), who like Cuthbert successfully combined the role of hermit and bishop. The Anonymous Life appears to have been particularly influenced by the example of Martin in its portrayal of Cuthbert's pastoral and healing activities.

It was commissioned by Bishop Eadfrith (died 721), the bishop famous for the Lindisfarne Gospels who also commissioned Bede's Prose Life of the saint. The Anonymous Life was organised into four books; though this was not common in the literature of the day, it followed the organization of the metrical Vita Sancti Martini of Venantius Fortunatus, Gregory of Tours' De Virtutibus Sancti Martini and the Dialogi of Gregory the Great (containing an account of the life of Benedict of Nursia). This may be an indication that the author regarded Cuthbert as a saint of stature comparable with Benedict and Martin.

The Anonymous Life's biggest literary influence was the Christian Scriptures, though it also borrowed some of the stories contained in Gregory's Dialogi, Sulpicius Severus' Vita Sancti Martini and the Vita Sancti Antonii, Evagrius' Latin translation of Athanasius' biography of Anthony the Great. This influence extends to long verbatim extracts, such as those from the Sulpicius Severus at book i chapter 2 and book iv chapter 1. The author was also familiar with Victor of Aquitaine's Epistola ad Hilarium and the Actus Silvestri. The primary source used however was the oral tradition of the Lindisfarne monks. Many of the men the author consulted were unnamed priests, deacons and other men respected in their communities, though some are named directly, namely Ælfflaed, Æthilwald, Plecgils, Tydi and Walhstod.

== Date and authorship ==
The Anonymous Life was complete somewhere between 699 and 705. The posthumous miracles set after Cuthbert's translation in 698 make 699 the earliest possible date for a completed text. As the text also says that King Aldfrith "is now reigning peacefully", it must have been written before the latter's death in 705.

The author of the Life of St Cuthbert has not been identified. Heinrich Hahn in 1883 put a case for Herefrith, the abbot of Lindisfarne mentioned as a source by Bede in his own Vita of the saint. Bertram Colgrave, the Anonymous Life's most recent editor, has roundly rejected Hahn's argument. While offering Baldhelm and Cynemund (two other sources of Bede) as better candidates, Colgrave did not endorse either and declared that "it must always be a matter of conjecture". From the text itself, and from the writings of Bede, it can be deduced that it was written by a monk of Lindisfarne. Bede, in his introduction to his Historia Ecclesiastica Gentis Anglorum, is almost certainly referring to this work when he wrote that

What I have written concerning the most holy father and bishop Cuthbert, whether in this volume or in my little book concerning his acts, I took in part from what I have previously found written about him by the brethren of Lindisfarne.

Throughout the Anonymous Life the author refers to Lindisfarne and its monastery with possessive pronouns. Though possibly written by many authors, the first person singular is used often enough to suggest only one major author.

== Manuscripts ==
The Anonymous Life is extant in eight manuscripts. The oldest, according to historian Donald Bullough, lies in Munich, Bayerische Staatsbibliothek, Clm. 15817 The manuscript was probably compiled at Salzburg under Bishop Adalram. It occupies folios 100v-119v, following two works of Augustine of Hippo (De pastoribus/Sermo xlvii, 1–53, and De Ovibus, 53r to 99v), and preceding Isidore of Seville's Synonyma. The copy contains many scribal errors, but also a number of readings superior to other versions.

Of the others, the oldest, probably written at the Abbey of St Bertin around c. 900, is extant in Folios 67b to 83b of St Omer 267. This manuscript contains works of saints Cyprian, Jerome, and Augustine, as well as hymn lyrics and music dedicated to Martin of Tours and Bertin of St Omer. St Omer 267 is still regarded as the best of all the available manuscripts in terms of accuracy, as well as age. Another St Omer manuscript, St Omer 715 preserves the Anonymous Life, occupying folios 164 to 168b. Here the Anonymous Life forms part of a larger legendary copied in the 12th century, with fifty-seven surviving vitae covering saints with feast days in the first three months of the year (January, February and March).

Missing nine chapters, the Anonymous Life is preserved in a late 10th-century manuscript from the abbey of St Vaast, Arras, Arras 812 (1029). It occupies folios 1 to 26b, and is out of order towards the end. It is followed in the manuscript by the Vita Sancti Guthlaci ("Life of Saint Guthlac"), the Vita Sancti Dunstani ("Life of Saint Dunstan") and the Vita Sancti Filiberti ("Life of Saint Filibert", abbot of Jumièges), and originally contained another hagiography of a Jumièges abbot, that of Aichard of Jumièges.

Three British Library manuscript volumes, Harley MSS 2800–2802, contain a very large legendary from Arnstein Abbey in the diocese of Trier (now Limburg), and the Anonymous Life is found at Harley MS 2800, folios 248 to 251b. The same legendary is in three 13th-century Brussels volumes, Royal Library MSS 98–100, 206, and 207–208. The Anonymous Life is present in MS 207–208 folios 158 to 163. In Trier, in another legendary composed around 1235 probably at the Abbey of St Maximin, the anonymous life can be found: the Trier, Public Library 1151, folios 135 to 142. Paris, Bibliothèque Nationale, Fonds Latin 5289, written in the 14th century, contains the last extant version of the Anonymous Life. It has been copied out of order, beginning on folio 55b, continuing on folios 49b to 52b, and ending on 56 to 58b.

Historian Bertram Colgrave believed that Harley MS 2800 and Brussels MS 207–208 have a common origin, a 12th-century legendary from the diocese of Trier. Both manuscripts share common features, such as the omission of place-names and personal names (e.g. Plecgils). Colgrave likewise attributed a common parent manuscript to Trier, Public Library 1151 and Paris Bibliothèque Nationale Fonds Latin 5289, as he did to Arras 812 (1029) and the two St Omer manuscripts. The Salzburg manuscript may be descended from an ancestor predating the common ancestor of the former and the latter set.

== Modern editions ==
The Anonymous Life has been published four times in the modern era:

- The Bollandists, Acta Sanctorum Martii, vol. iii, (Antwerp, 1668), pp. 117–24
- J. A. Giles, Venerabilis Bedae Opera, vol. vi, (London, 1843), pp. 357–82
- Joseph Stevenson, Venerabilis Bedae Opera Historica Minora, (English Historical Society, London, 1851), pp. 259–84
- Bertram Colgrave, Two Lives of Saint Cuthbert: A Life by an Anonymous Monk of Lindisfarne and Bede's Prose Life, (Cambridge, 1940)

The Bollandist version was based on St Omer 267 and Trier Public Library 1151. Giles' edition was a reprint of the Bollandist version. Stevenson's version too was a reprint of the Bollandist version, with some corrections brought in. Colgrave's edition was new, but like the Bollandist version is primarily based on St Omer 267.

== Synopsis ==
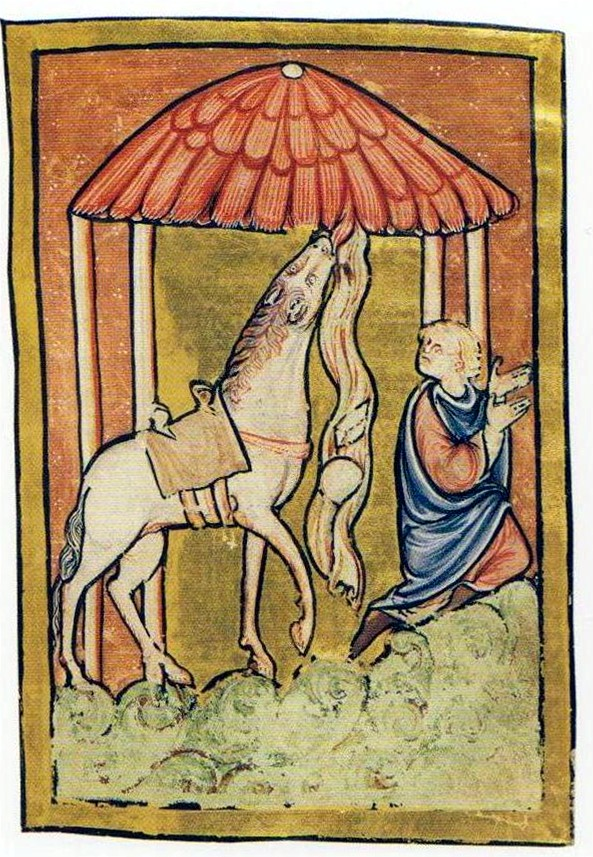
Cuthbert's horse finds food on the roof of an abandoned dwelling

The Anonymous Life consists of 4 books, book i relating Cuthbert's youth, book ii his early years serving God, book iii his time as a hermit on Farne, and book iv his time as bishop.

=== Book i ===
Chapters one and two of book i consist of the prologue and preface, with the author indicating that the work was commissioned by Bishop Eadfrith. In chapter three the eight-year-old Cuthbert plays with other children, showing off his physical abilities, until a three-year-old playmate, addressing him as "bishop and priest", chides him for lack of humility; this miracle the author claimed to have learned from Bishop Tumma, who apparently heard it from Cuthbert's own mouth (though Cuthbert confessed that the significance was unknown to him at the time). Still an eight-year-old, Cuthbert becomes lame and is visited by an angel who instructs him on a cure (chapter four).

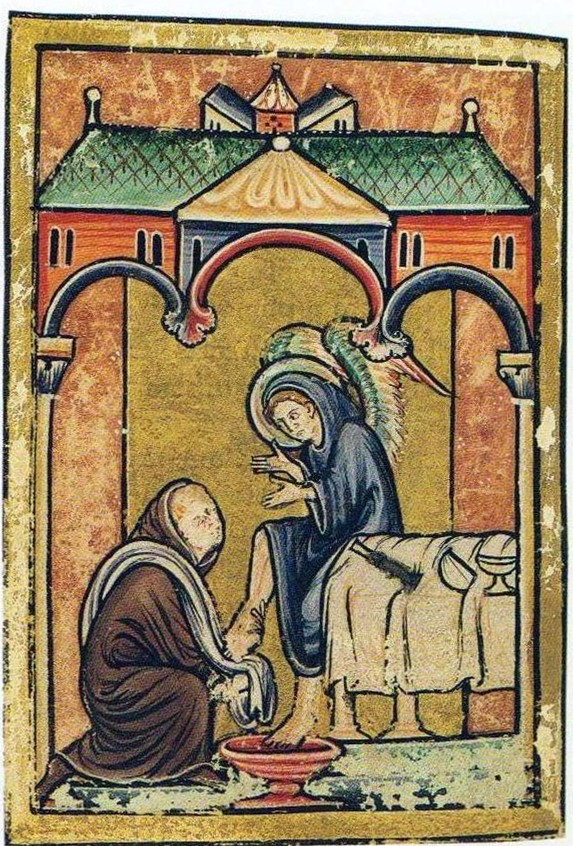
Cuthbert with the disguised angel

In chapter five Cuthbert, while still a youth tending to sheep in Lauderdale, has a vision of a bishop being borne to heaven; subsequently it is discovered that Aidan, bishop of Lindisfarne, had died on the same hour as Cuthbert's vision. Far to the south, a young Cuthbert is travelling during the winter and crosses the river Wear at Chester-le-Street, taking shelter in one of the empty summer dwellings; suffering from lack of food, his horse pulls down warm bread and meat from the roof of the dwelling (chapter six). Book i ends with the anonymous author making mention of several other miracles of Cuthbert's youth without going into detail: how God provided food for him in camp with his army against an enemy, how he saw the soul of a reeve taken up to the sky, his defeat of some demons, and his cure of the insane (chapter seven).

=== Book ii ===
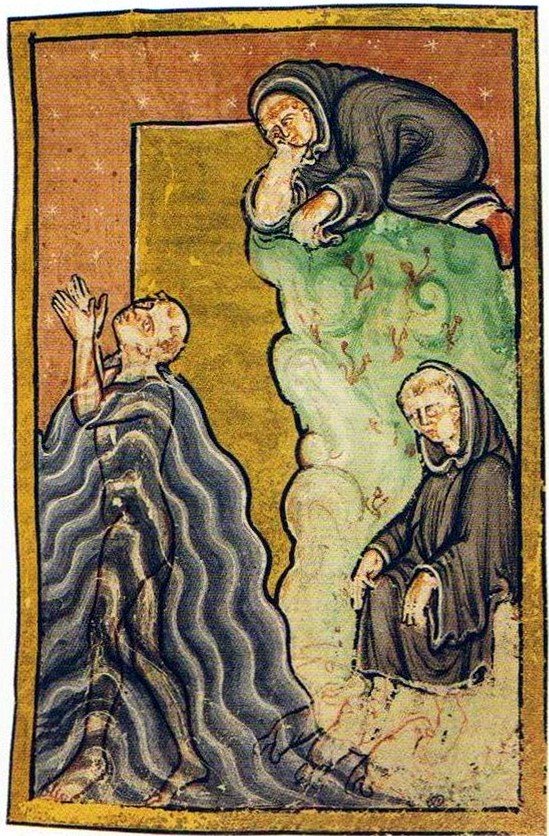
Cleric watching the sea creatures tend to Cuthbert's feet

In book ii Cuthbert becomes a monk (chapter one). While still a neophyte at the monastery of Ripon, Cuthbert is given the job of greeting guests; having washed and rubbed the feet of one guest, Cuthbert seeks to feed the visitor, finds he has no bread in the guesthouse and so goes to the monastery; but because the bread there is still baking, he has to return empty handed; when Cuthbert returns the visitor—an angel in disguise—has vanished leaving three warm loaves. Cuthbert, having been invited to the monastery of Coldingham by Abbess Æbbe, is followed by a cleric to the beach where he keeps one of his night-time vigils; the cleric sees two sea-animals emerge from the waves to clean and rub Cuthbert's feet; the author of the Anonymous Life was told this by a priest of Melrose called Plecgils (chapter three). In the following chapter Cuthbert and two brothers, having sailed to the land of the Picts, become hungry in the territory of the Niuduera (probably in eastern Fife) waiting for the sea to calm in order to resume their voyage; their hunger is relieved however when three slices of prepared dolphin meat is found on the beach, enough to feed them for three days; the story was reported to the author by a priest named Tydi, still living as the work was authored (chapter four).

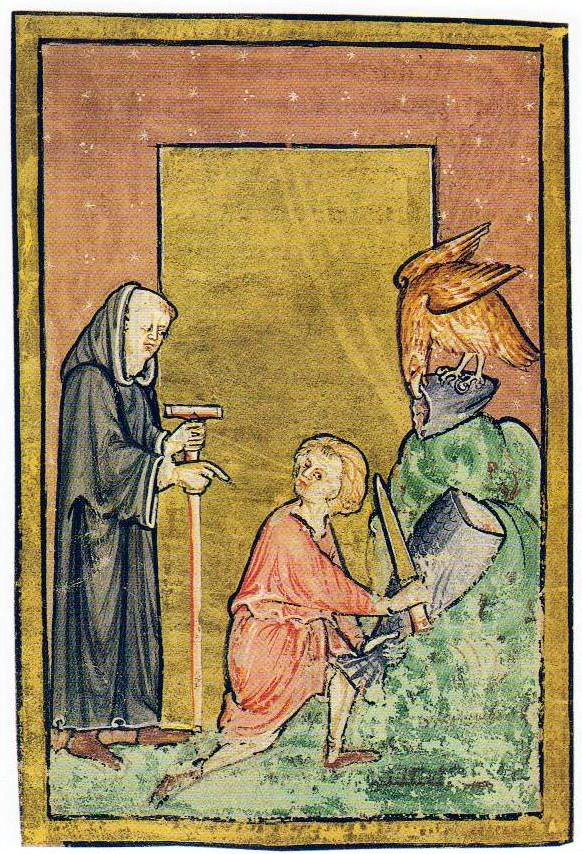
Eagle with the fish on the river Teviot

According to Tydi too, Cuthbert and a boy were walking along the river Teviot teaching and baptizing the mountain people, when an eagle came from the sky and landed by the river; the boy ran towards the eagle and found a fish; after giving half of it to the eagle, the party fed themselves with the other half (chapter five). On the same trip the Devil created an illusion of a burning house, tricking some of the men despite Cuthbert's warning; the men, realising their mistake in seeking to extinguish the flames, asked and were given Cuthbert's forgiveness. Cuthbert is said in chapter seven to have saved from flames the house of his childhood nanny, a nun and widow named Kewswith of Hruringaham through prayer, while in chapter eight he drives out a demon from the wife of a religious man named Hildmer, curing her illness.

=== Book iii ===
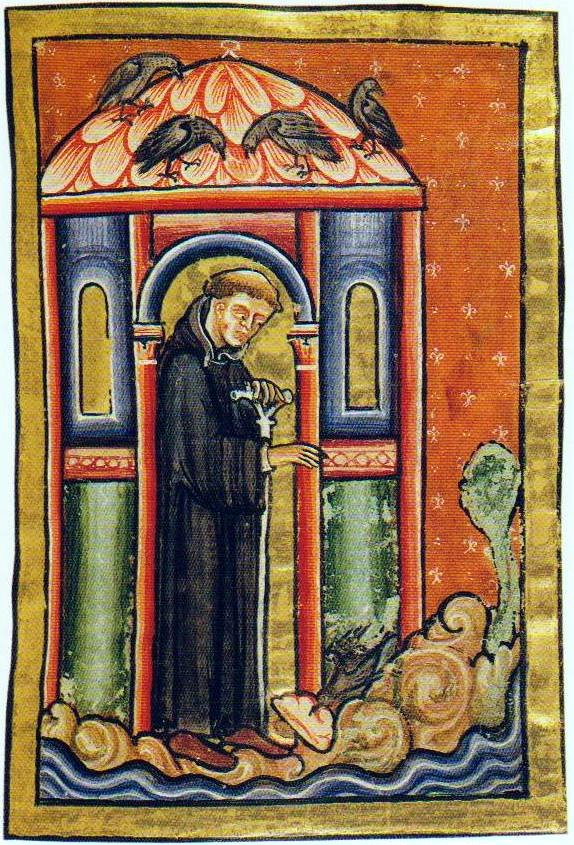
Penitent ravens bring Cuthbert pig lard

Cuthbert's time as an island hermit is described in book iii. Having served as prior of Melrose for some time performing other miracles (omitted by the author), Cuthbert departs for Lindisfarne at the instigation of Bishop Eata; designing a monastic rule for the monks there, Cuthbert seeks a more solidary existence on the island of Farne, defeats the demons there and begins to build a residence (chapter one). Cuthbert moves a huge rock for the construction of his building (chapter two), and orders his men to dig up some stony ground created an open spring into being (chapter three). The waves provide Cuthbert with the 12-foot beam he needs for the house after his men are unable to obtain one (chapter four).

When ravens, despite being warned, disturb the roof of the shelter built for Cuthbert's servants, the saint banishes them from the island in the name of Jesus; after three days one raven returns seeking pardon and, having been forgiven by Cuthbert, both ravens provide the saint with enough pig lard to grease everyone's boots for a whole year (chapter five). Cuthbert is summoned to Coquet Island by the sister of King Ecgfrith, the royal abbess Ælfflaed; following her entreaties for information about her brother's fate, Cuthbert prophesies the king's coming death and his succession by Aldfrith, monk of Iona; Cuthbert agrees to become bishop within two years (chapter six). In chapter seven, the author closes book iii with a summary of Cuthbert's virtues and achievements.

=== Book iv ===
Cuthbert becomes bishop of Lindisfarne at the beginning of book iv, accepting the position only with reluctance and continuing his monastic style of life (chapters one and two). A number of healing miracles are subsequently recounted. Cuthbert cures the wife of one of Aldfrith's men, a gesith (comes) named Hemma from a district name Kintis (chapter three). He cures a maiden from a village called Bedesfeld, a miracle witnessed and reported by Æthilwald, then a priest but in the author's day prior of Melrose, whose relation the maiden was (chapter four). He cures a paralytic boy brought to him in the district of Ahse in the mountains between Hexham and Carlise (chapter five). In a miracle related to the author by Tydi, Cuthbert saves an infant and the infant's family from the plague at a village named Medilwong. Cuthbert is the savior of a servant Sibba, a Tweedside gesith, is retold thanks to the account provided by another former servant of Sibba's who is now a monk at Lindisfarne (chapter seven).

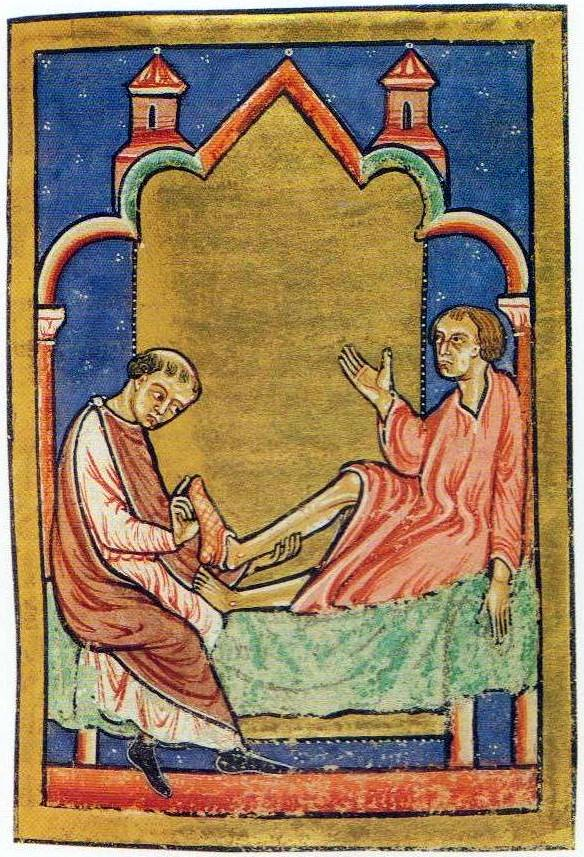
Cuthbert's shoes healing the a paralytic

With King Ecgfrith off fighting the Picts, Cuthbert visits the queen at Carlise; as Cuthbert is conducted by Waga, the city's reeve, he announces that the war is over and that the Ecgfrith has been slain; it was later revealed that Cuthbert's assertion happened at the same hour as the king's death in battle (chapter eight). At Carlisle Cuthbert meets an anchorite named Hereberht, who asks to die at the same day and hour as Cuthbert; the request is granted, and subsequently both go to heaven on the same hour of the same night (chapter nine). Cuthbert, dining at Ovington with abbess Ælfflæd, predicts the death of one of Ælfflæd's servants, Hadwald (chapter ten). The bishop resigns his bishopric after an episcopate of two years and returns to Farne (chapter eleven). Miracles continue as Cuthbert cures a ("still surviving") brother named Walhstod from dysentery. Cuthbert dies on Farne, and his body was washed and dressed before being shipped to Lindisdfarne (chapter thirteen).

After eleven years, Cuthbert's successor Bishop Eadberht orders the reopening of Cuthbert's coffin; Cuthbert's body is found to be incorrupt, i.e. having not decayed any noticeable way (chapter fourteen). Miracles begin happening at Cuthbert's coffin, prayers and holy water from the trench Cuthbert's body had been washed in curing a boy from demonic possession (fifteen). A monk from the household of Bishop Willbrord, visiting Lindisfarne, was taken by serious illness but was cured after praying at Cuthbert's coffin (chapter sixteen). Likewise, a paralytic youth brought to Lindisfarne by another monastery for attention from Lindisfarne medics, is cured only after wearing the shoes once worn by Cuthbert (chapter seventeen). The author ends the Anonymous Life of Cuthbert declaring that he has omitted many other miracles in order to avoid overburdening his reader (chapter eighteen).

== Differences with Bede ==
For Bede's two dedicated accounts of Cuthbert's life, the Anonymous Life is the chief source. Bede however made little acknowledgment of his debt to the Anonymous Life in either his prose or verse life, and indeed if we were dependent only on Bede we would probably not know the work ever existed. Stylistically the Latin of the Anonymous Life is not as grammatical and classicizing as Bede's Prose Life, and Bede went to some effort to 'improve' the prose.

Bede adds some details in his own accounts but, in the words of historian Antonia Gransden "most of his additions are verbal and hagiographical trimmings". While following the Anonymous Life's order for most of the Prose Life, Bede considerably alters the order of miracles found in book iv. The Anonymous Life suggests that Cuthbert began his career at Ripon, whereas Bede shows that it was in fact Melrose. Historian Clare Stancliffe suggested that the Anonymous Life made Ripon Cuthbert's place of tonsure because Melrose may have been tarnished in some eyes due to its use of Irish-style tonsure (in contrast to the Petrine tonsure of Ripon).

Bede adds a longer account of Cuthbert's death supplied to him by abbot Herefrith. Bede also expands the story of Hereberht, adding the name of Hereberht's abode as Derwentwater. Otherwise Bede omitted many of the Old English proper names supplied in the Anonymous Life. Bede adds stories about the death of Boisil, a goose on Farne, the death of Bishop Eadberht, and provides information about Cuthbert's successors on Farne.

== See also ==
- Historia de Sancto Cuthberto
- Vita Sancti Wilfrithi
