= Clare Stancliffe =

Historian and medievalist

Clare Stancliffe is a historian and medievalist. She teaches ecclesiastical history in the Departments of History and Theology & Religion at Durham University. She is known for developing the concept of the "colours of martyrdom" in early Irish Christianity.

== Publications ==
Stancliffe's publications include:

- "Red, White and Blue Martyrdom", in Ireland in Early Mediaeval Europe: Studies in memory of Kathleen Hughes (Cambridge University Press, 1982),
- "Cuthbert and the Polarity between Pastor and Solitary", in Gerald Bonner, David Rollason, Clare Stancliffe (eds), St Cuthbert, His Cult and His Community to AD 1200 (Woodbridge: Boydell Press, 1989), pp. 21–44
- "Oswald: Most Holy and Most Victorious King of the Northumbrians", in Clare Stancliffe & Eric Cambridge (eds) Oswald: Northumbrian King to European Saint (Stamford: Paul Watkins, 1995)
- "Where Was Oswald Killed?", in C. Stancliffe and E. Cambridge (eds), Oswald: Northumbrian King to European Saint (1995, 1996)
- "St Martin and his hagiographer: History and miracle in Sulpicius Severus" (Oxford: Clarendon Press, 1983)
- Bede, Wilfrid, and the Irish, Jarrow Lecture 46 (Jarrow: St Paul's Church, 2003)
- "Patrick (fl. 5th cent.), patron saint of Ireland", Oxford Dictionary of National Biography (2004)
- The Miracle Stories in Seventh-century Irish Saints' Lives (1992)
