= Stephen of Ripon =

7th/8th-century Anglo-Saxon monk and writer

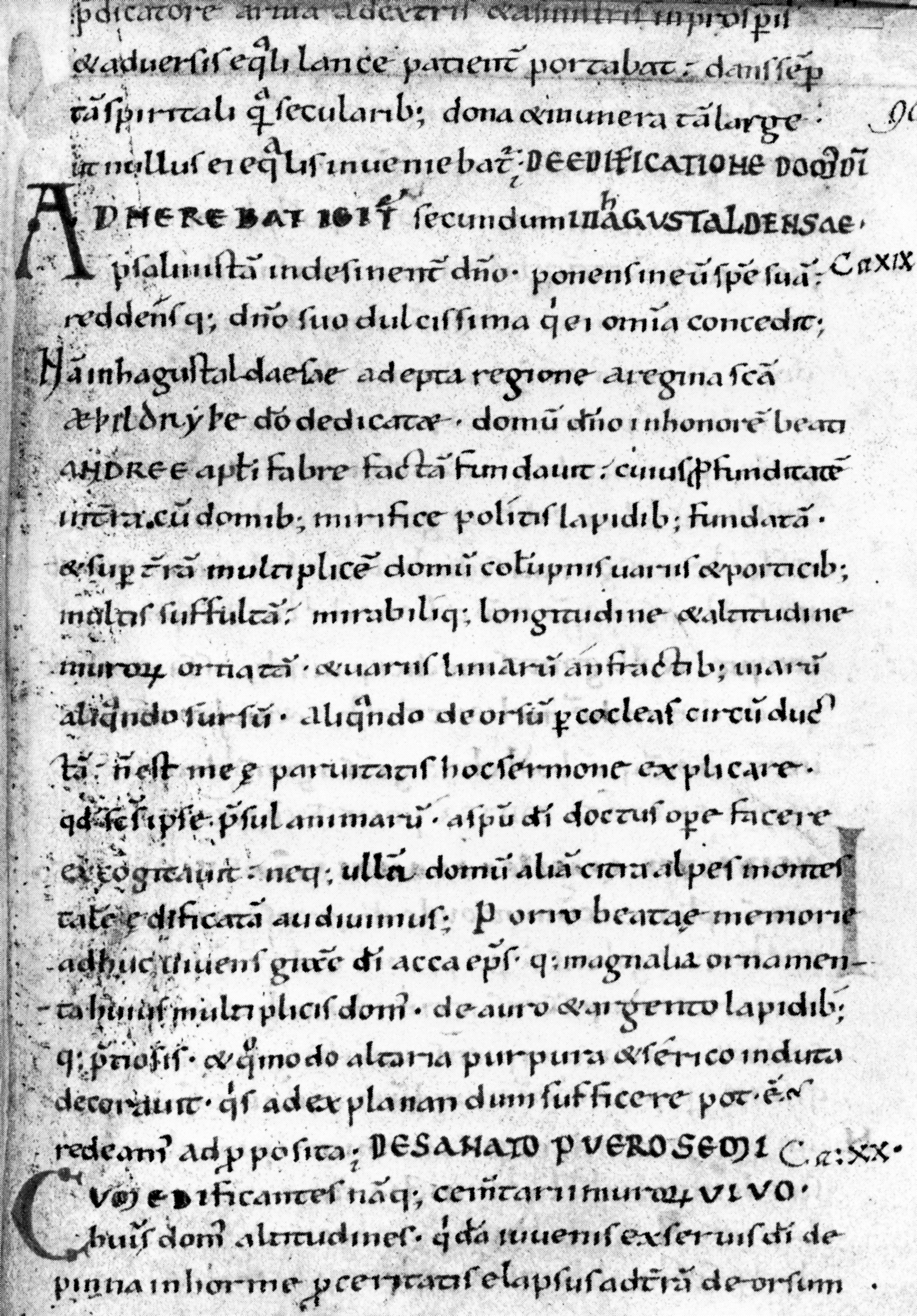
Page from an 11th-century manuscript of the Vita Sancti Wilfrithi describing the foundation of Hexham Abbey

Stephen of Ripon was the author of the eighth-century hagiographic text Vita Sancti Wilfrithi ("Life of Saint Wilfrid"). Other names once traditionally attributed to him are Eddius Stephanus or Æddi Stephanus, but these names are no longer preferred or accepted by historians today; modern usage tends to favour "Stephen". (Note: For a discussion on this see Goffart "The Ghost of Bishop Wilfrid".)

== Life ==
Very little is known about the life of Stephen of Ripon. The author of "The life of Saint Wilfrid" identifies himself as "Stephen, a priest". Bede mentions that Wilfrid brought a singing master from Kent, Ædde Stephanus, to Ripon in 669 to teach chant, and traditionally he is thought to be the same person as the "Stephen" mentioned in the text. The written evidence suggest there are two candidates for the same person. If the two were the same, Stephen would have been at least twenty years old when he came north, placing him in his sixties or older at Wilfrid's death in 709. He was then recorded as being present at the anniversary of Wilfrid's death a year later. Thus the question of Stephen's age has made some historians wonder whether Stephen was in Wilfrid's entourage at all but were part of a later generation. The biographer Stephen had Ripon as his religious home and would have been able to consult all the individuals who knew Wilfrid as source material for "The life of Saint Wilfrid".

== Writings ==
=== Vita Sancti Wilfrithi ===
Stephen's Vita Sancti Wilfrithi is the only documentary source on Saint Wilfrid, aside from Bede's Ecclesiastical History of the English People. It was written shortly after Wilfrid's death in 709. Stephen was asked to write the Vita by Acca of Hexham, one of Wilfrid's followers, who later became a bishop and succeeded Wilfrid in the See of Hexham. Although Stephen likely knew Wilfrid and had access to others who knew him, he recounts several extraordinary events and makes use of available text sources. He copies two lines directly from Vita Sancti Cuthberti, otherwise known as the Anonymous Life of Saint Cuthbert. However, unlike many early medieval hagiographies which consisted of strings of miracles attributed to saints, Stephen's Vita takes the form of a chronological narrative and includes specific names and events.

It is unknown what Stephen hoped to accomplish in writing the Vita Sancti Wilfrithi, but scholars have several theories. It has been argued that Stephen's use of lines from Vita Sancti Cuthberti was a way of outdoing the cult based around Cuthbert and replacing him with Wilfrid. However, Stephen's borrowings make up only a tiny percentage of the whole and are entirely located in the early part of the work, making this theory seem unlikely.

The work is biased in favour of Wilfrid and includes explicit comparisons of Wilfrid to Old Testament figures and to the Apostle Paul. Early on, Stephen explains that the community urged him to write the Vita. Stephen's goal in writing could simply have been to describe the community's feelings on the holiness and goodness of the life of Wilfrid, whom they had known personally.

== Significance ==
Stephen's Vita Sancti Wilfrithi was one of the first Anglo-Saxon histories, and the earliest to survive. Bede used it as a source for sections of his Ecclesiastical History of the English People, although he did not acknowledge it.

The Vita Sancti Wilfrithi is also significant in that it provides a contemporary perspective on events that transpired during Wilfrid's lifetime. For instance, it gives an account of the Synod of Whitby that differs from Bede's. While Stephen's writing has come under more criticism than Bede's, the account found in the Vita Sancti Wilfrithi reveals political factors that may have affected the Synod alongside the religious controversies described by Bede.

== In fiction ==
As Eddi, he appears in two works by Rudyard Kipling:

- "Eddi's Service"
- "The Conversion of St Wilfrid"

== Edition ==
=== Manuscripts ===
From: Colgrave, Life of St Wilfrid. pp. xiii-xiv.

- 1. London, British Library, Cotton Vespasian D. vi. Provenance: probably transferred from Yorkshire before it was held in Canterbury and then acquired by the British Library.

fos. 2-77: 9th century, with 11th-century additions;
fos. 78-125: 11th century, with 12th-century additions on the final page.

- 2. Oxford, Bodleian Library, Fell vol. III 34a-56b, originally vol. I. Written in late 11th or early 12th century.

== Bibliography ==
- Abels, Richard (1983). "The Council of Whitby: a study in early Anglo-Saxon politics". The Journal of British Studies. 23 (1): 1–25. doi:10.1086/385808. JSTOR 175627.
- Foley, William Trent (1992). Images of Sanctity in Eddius Stephanus Life of Bishop Wilfred an early English saint's life. Lewiston, NY: Edward Mellen Press. ISBN 978-0-7734-9513-5.
- Goffart, Walter (2012). "The Ghost of Bishop Wilfrid". The Narrators of Barbarian History(ad 550-800). Notre Dame: University of Notre Dame. ISBN 978-0-268-02967-8.
- Heffernan, Thomas J. (1992). Sacred Biography: saints and their biographers in the Middle Ages. New York: Oxford University Press. ISBN 978-0195-07907-4.
- Kipling, Rudyard (2019). "Rewards and Fairies: The Conversion of Saint Wilfrid". Gutenberg.
- Kirby, D. P. (1983). "Bede, Eddius Stephanus and the Life of Wilfrid". The English Historical Review. 98 (386): 101–114. doi:10.1093/ehr/XCVIII.CCCLXXXVI.101. JSTOR 570165.
- Kirby, D. P. (1965). "Problems of Early West Saxon History". The English Historical Review. 80 (314): 10–29. doi:10.1093/ehr/LXXX.CCCXIV.10. JSTOR 560735.
- Laynesmith, Mark D. (2000). "Stephen of Ripon and the Bible: allegorical and typological interpretations of the Life of St Wilfrid". Early Medieval Europe. 9 (2): 163–82. doi:10.1111/1468-0254.00064.
- Stephen of Ripon (1927). Colgrave, Betram (ed.). "The Life of Bishop Wilfrid by Eddius Stephanus". Translated by Betram Colgrave – via Archive.org.
