= Vita Sancti Wilfrithi =

8th-century Latin biography of Wilfrid

- "The Life of St. Wilfrid"
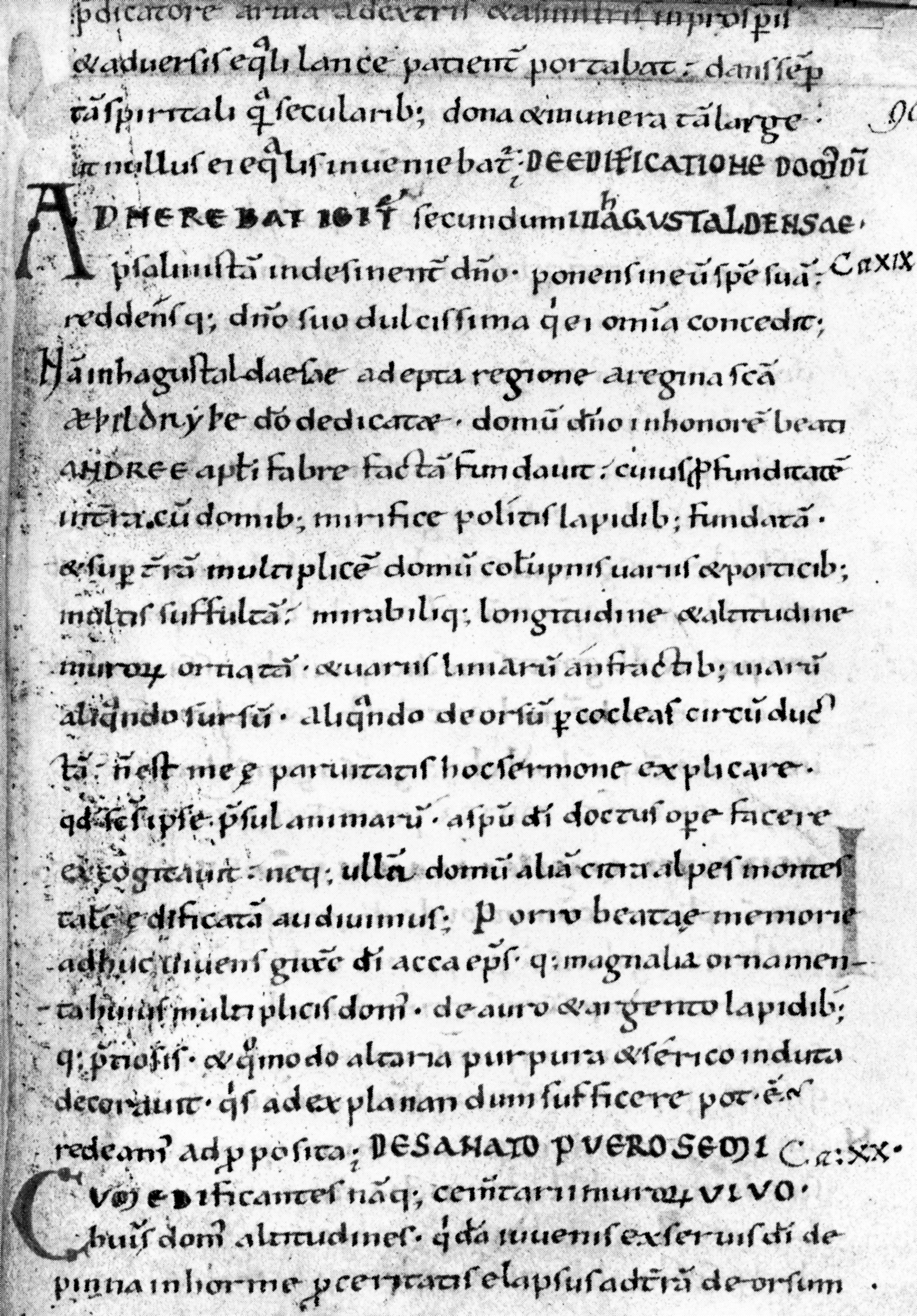
- A page from an 11th-century manuscript of the Vita Sancti Wilfrithi describing the foundation of Hexham Abbey
- Author(s): Stephen of Ripon
- Language: Medieval Latin
- Date: Composed between 709 and c. 720
- Manuscript(s): 1. London, British Library, Cotton Vespasian D. vi. Provenance: probably transferred from Yorkshire before it was held in Canterbury and then acquired by the British Library.; fos. 2-77: 9th century, with 11th-century additions; fos. 78-125: 11th century, with 12th-century additions on the final page.: 2. Oxford, Bodleian Library, Fell vol. III 34a-56b, originally vol. I. Written in the late 11th or early 12th century.
- Genre: Prose hagiography

The Vita Sancti Wilfrithi or Life of St Wilfrid (spelled "Wilfrid" in the modern era) is an early 8th-century hagiographic text recounting the life of the Northumbrian bishop, Wilfrid. Although a hagiography, it has few miracles, while its main concerns are with the politics of the Northumbrian church and the history of the monasteries of Ripon and Hexham. It is one of a collection of historical sources from the late 7th- and early 8th-centuries, along with the anonymous Vita Sancti Cuthberti, the works of Bede and Adomnán's Vita Sancti Columbae, that detail the Christianisation of Great Britain and make the period the best documented period in English history before the age of Alfred the Great.

== Date and authorship ==
In the preface to the Vita Wilfrithi, the author reveals that he is a priest called Stephen. Writers in modern times often style the author "Eddius Stephanus", an attribution that goes back to the 17th century. This attribution is now thought unlikely by many historians. The identification was made because the Vita Wilfrithi recounts that sometime between 666 and 669, Wilfrid brought two singing masters from Kent to Ripon, Ædde and Æona.

This Ædde was also mentioned by Bede, who says that an Æddi cognomento Stephanus ("Ædde, also known as Stephen") was brought to Northumbria by Wilfrid and was the first singing-master (cantor) among the Northumbrians. This is not however thought to be good evidence by many modern historians, while many other factors, such as age, make the attribution positively unlikely.

The Vita Wilfrithi can be dated reasonably securely between 709, the year of Wilfrid's death, and c. 720. The latter date, c. 720, is the approximate date of the Vita Sancti Cuthberti, a text which the Vita Wilfrithi quotes, and indeed imitates so often that one historian has used the word "plagiarism". There are some indications that it was written after 716.

== Synopsis ==
The Vita narrates the life and career of Wilfrid, from his boyhood until his death, with brief digressions into the other affairs of Wilfrid's two main monasteries, Ripon and Hexham. It details his boyhood decision to become a churchman, his quarrels with Theodore of Tarsus, Archbishop of Canterbury, and various secular figures, his travels back and forth between England and Rome, his participation in church synods, and eventually his death.

The text devotes over one third of its contents to Wilfrid's "Northumbrian achievements", but Stephen devotes almost no space to Wilfrid's second period in office as Bishop of York (686–691), and little space to his activity in Mercia. The Vita Wilfrithi, in common with many hagiographies written close to the death of their subject, records very few miracles, but like Bede and Eusebius of Caesarea, incorporates full documents relevant to its story.

== Problems ==
According to Fulk et al., the Vita Wilfrithi is tendentious and partisan. The Vita, perhaps mirroring the views of Wilfrid himself, is contemptuous of the Gaelic contribution, the "poisonous seeds" they planted, to the development of the Northumbrian and English church, and thus discredits Lindisfarne and the other English monasteries associated with them.

Wilfrid is given full responsibility for the victory of the Roman faction in the Synod of Whitby, his great triumph over the Gaelic monks. Bede however sidelines Wilfrid, making it unclear to the modern historian which writer is being more accurate; and while Stephen depicts the second half of the 7th century as a "Wilfridian golden age", in the narrative of Bede's Historia Ecclesiastica Gentis Anglorum, Wilfrid is but one of many ecclesiastical figures who contribute to the development of the English church. These factors led the historian Walter Goffart to argue that Bede's Historia Ecclesiastica was actually written because the leaders of the Bernician church sought to counter the version of history being promulgated by the Deiran "Wilfridians" in the Vita Wilfrithi.

== Inspirations ==
The Vita Wilfrithi inspired a 10th-century Latin poem entitled Breviloquium Vitae Wilfridi, written by Frithegod to commemorate Oda's acquisition of Wilfrid's relics for Canterbury Cathedral around 950. The historian Michael Lapidge has called the Breviloquium "one of the most difficult Latin poems written in pre-conquest England".
