= Folcard =

11th-century Flemish haigiographer and monk

Folcard or Foulcard (fl. 1066) was a Flemish hagiographer.

== Life ==
Folcard, a Fleming by birth, was a monk of St. Bertin's in Flanders (now Northern France), and is supposed to have come over to England in the reign of Edward the Confessor. He entered the monastery of Christ Church, Canterbury, and was renowned for his learning, and especially for his knowledge of grammar and music; his manners were affable and his temper cheerful. Soon after the Norman Conquest the king set him over Thorney Abbey in Cambridgeshire; but he was never strictly abbot, for he did not receive the benediction.

After holding the abbey about sixteen years Folcard retired, after a dispute with the Bishop of Lincoln, Remigius de Fécamp; and returned, as may be inferred from Ordericus Vitalis, to his own country. Either while he was a monk at Canterbury, or during his residence at Thorney, which seems more probable, he and his monastery were in some trouble, and were helped by Aldred, Archbishop of York, who persuaded the queen either of the Confessor or of the Conqueror to interest herself in their cause. In return Folcard wrote the Life of Archbishop John of Beverley for Aldred.

Folcard is one of two writers proposed as the author of the Vita Ædwardi Regis, the life of Edward the Confessor, commissioned by his wife Edith. The historian Tom Licence defends Folcard's authorship, but other scholars favour Goscelin.

== Works ==
- Vita S. Bertini (Saint Bertin), dedicated to Bovo, abbot of St. Bertin's from 1043 to 1065, and printed in Mabillon's Acta SS. O. S. B. III. ii. 104, and in Migne's Patrologia, cxlvii. 1082.
- Vita Audomari (Saint Audomar), in Mabillon, ii. 557, and Migne.
- A poem in honorem S. Vigoris Episcopi (Saint Vigor), written between 1045 and 1074, in Achery's Spicilegium, iv. 576, and Migne.
- Vita S. Oswaldi (Oswald of Worcester), in Mabillon, i. 727, the Bollandists' Acta Sanctorum, Capgrave, and Migne.
- Responsoria for the Festival of St. John of Beverley, composed before Vita S. Johannis Episcopi Eboracensis, which was written before 1070, and is printed in the Bollandists' 'Acta SS.' May, ii. 165, Migne, and Historians of York (Rolls Ser.), i. 238. (Note: A now lost manuscript of this work also contained a Vita S. Johannis written by William Ketel, which was transcribed and published in the Acta Sanctorum.)
- Vita S. Botulfi (Botwulf of Thorney), suggested by the fact that the relics of the saint were at Thorney, dedicated to Walkelin, Bishop of Winchester, and therefore written in or after 1070, in Mabillon, III. 1, the Bollandists' Acta SS. June iv. 324, and Migne.
