= Drosten Stone =

The Drosten Stone
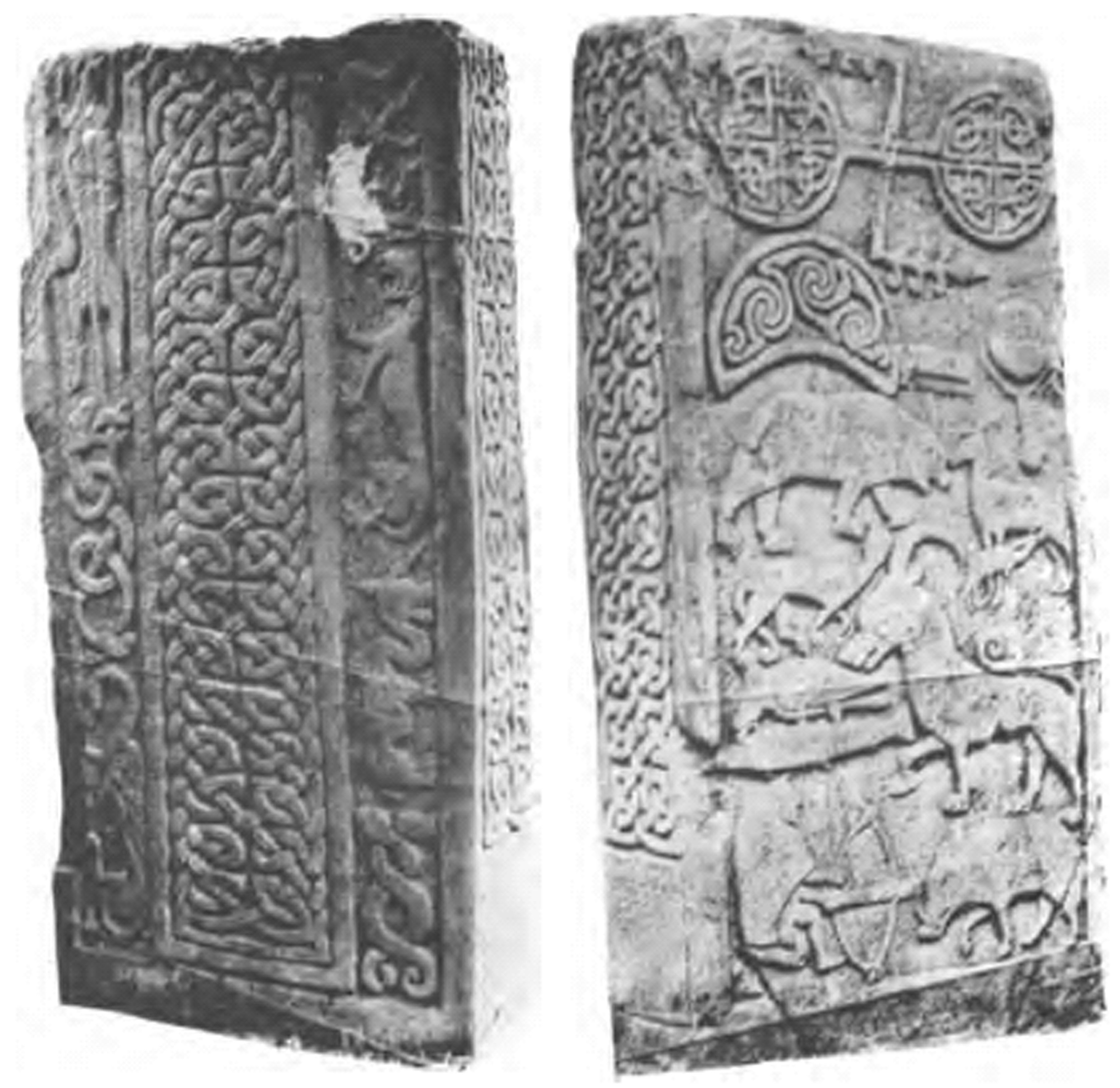
- The Drosten Stone
- Writing: Roman script: DROSTEN: IPEUORET [E]TTFOR; CUS
- Symbols: Celtic cross; Crescent; Double disc and z-rod; Mirror and comb; Knotwork
- Created: 9th century CE
- Present location: St Vigeans, Angus, Scotland
- Classification: Class II Cross slab (defaced)
- Culture: Picto-Scottish

The Drosten Stone is a carved Pictish stone of the 9th century at St Vigeans, near Arbroath, Scotland. In academic contexts it is sometimes called St Vigeans 1.

== Inscription ==
The Drosten Stone is a Class 2 cross-slab: a flat rectangular stone with a cross carved on one side and symbols on the other. The stone is unusual in having a non-ogham inscription.

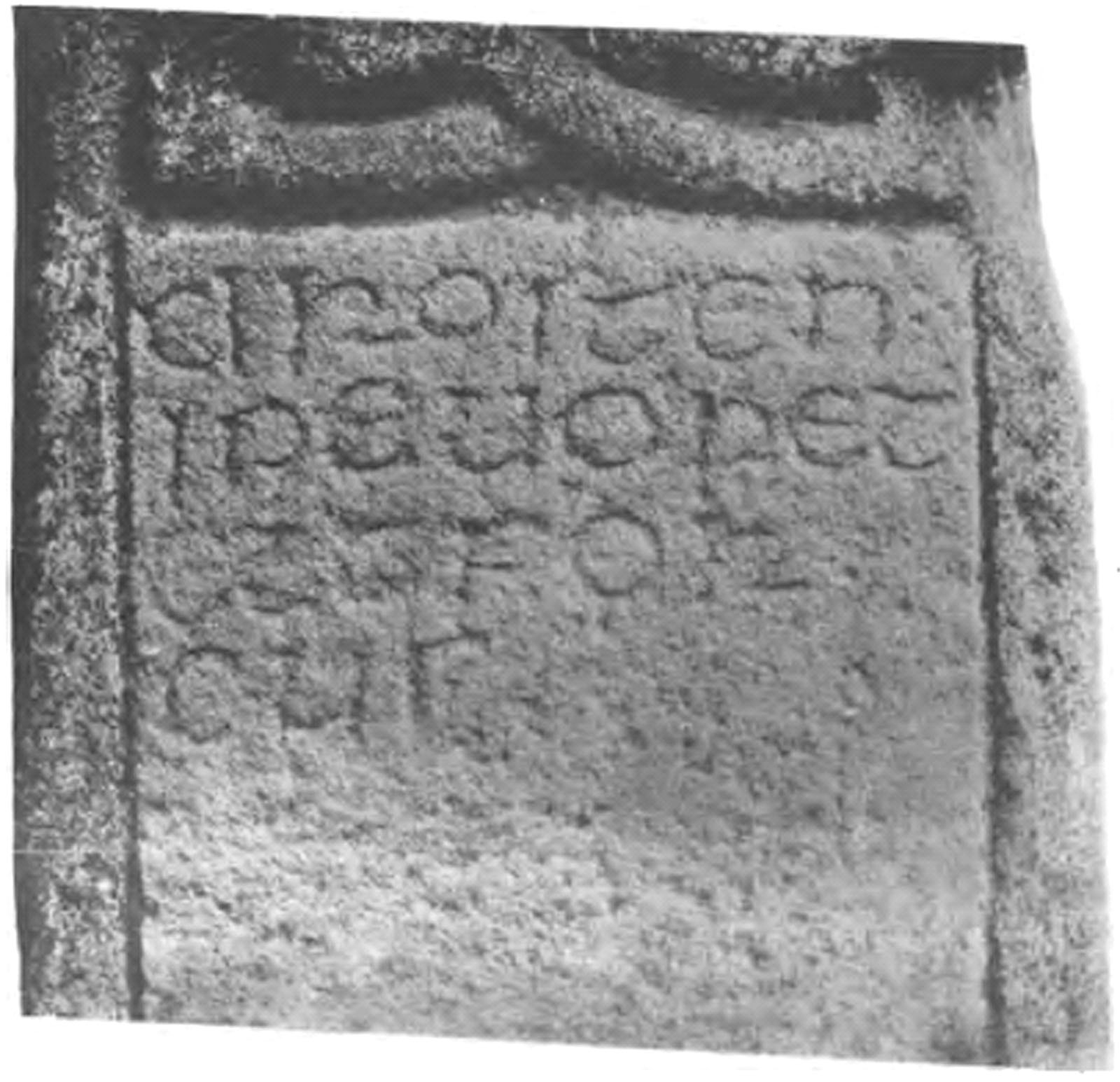
The Drosten Stone, showing the inscription.

The inscription is read as:

DROSTEN:
IPEUORET
[E]TTFOR
CUS

Thomas Owen Clancy has interpreted the text as Goidelic, giving Drosten, i ré Uoret ett Forcus (Drosten, in the time of Uoret, and Forcus). Clancy notes three possibilities for the origin of the stone. One is as a monument to a noble or ecclesiastic called Drosten, a common Pictish name related to Tristan, who died in the reign of Uoret and Fergus. The second possibility is a dedication to the popular Pictish Saint Drostan, or perhaps to Saints Drostan and Fergus. The final possibility noted by Clancy is that Drosten and Fergus had the stone made. Clancy believes the stone should be dated to the reign of the Pictish king Uurad (i.e. Uoret) (839–842), again, an unusual feature in that Pictish stones can rarely be so precisely dated.

Guto Rhys hypothesized that UORET may be a personal name, or a Pictish form of the Old Welsh noun guoret, meaning "protection".
