= Dingwall Stone =

Ancient artifact found in Scotland

Coordinates: 57.5974°N 4.4289°W

The Dingwall Stone is a Class I Pictish stone located in Dingwall, Easter Ross, Scotland. It is thought by some to be of Bronze Age origin, and contains several cup and ring marks alleged to date from that period. If it had been used in the Bronze Age, the Picts later reused it. On one side it has a crescent and v-rod, and on the other a double disc and Z-rod with another two crescents and Z-rods below. It was being used as a lintel over a doorway in the church when it was identified in 1880.
