= Strathmartine Castle Stone =

The Strathmartine Castle Stone
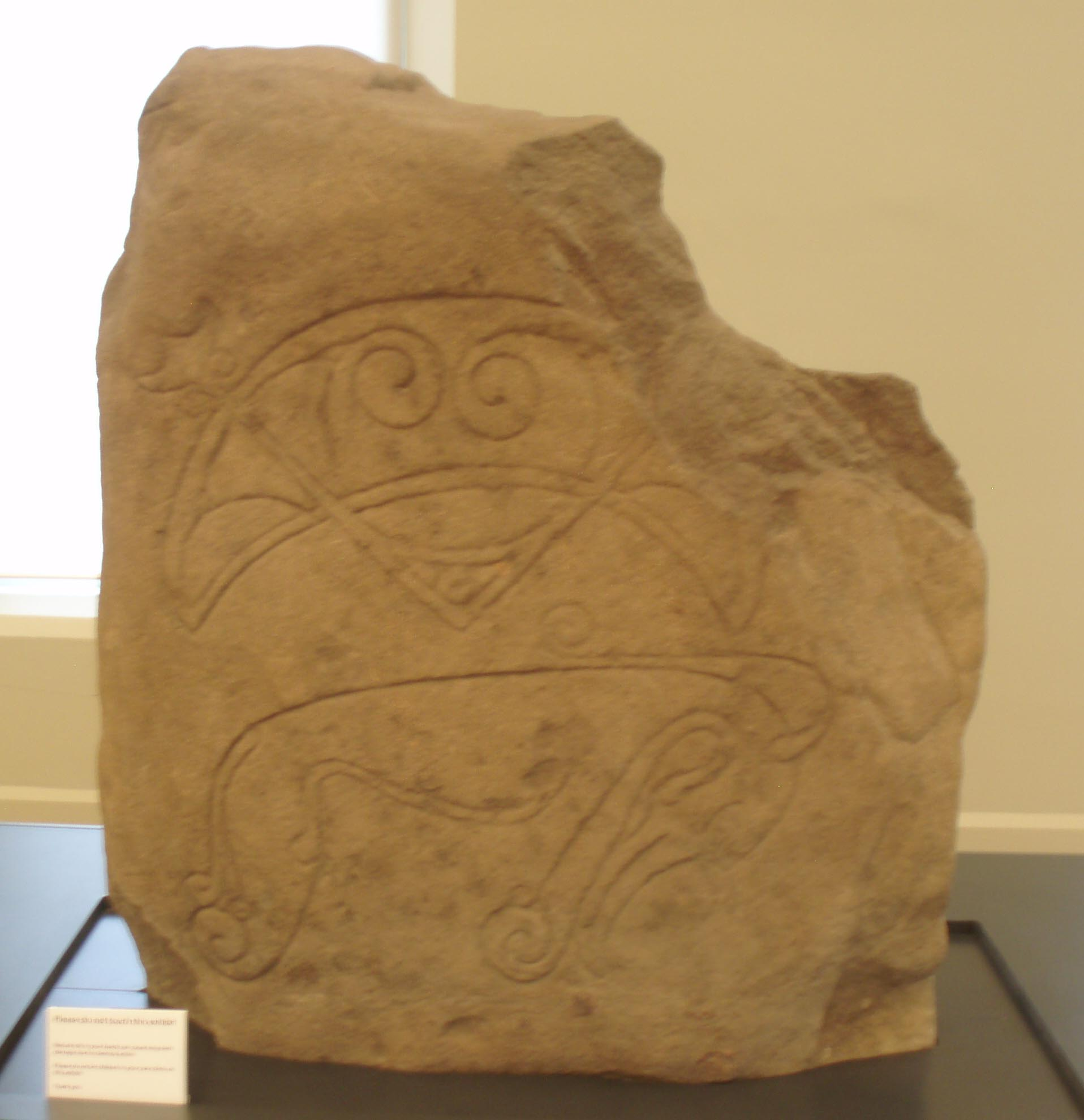
- The Strathmartine Castle Stone
- Material: Old Red Sandstone
- Height: 1.35 metres (4.4 ft)
- Symbols: Pictish beast; Crescent and v-rod
- Present location: McManus Galleries, Dundee, Scotland
- Coordinates: 56.5261°N 3.0179°W
- Classification: Class I Incised Stone
- Culture: Picto-Scottish

The Strathmartine Castle Stone is a class I Pictish stone from Strathmartine, Angus, Scotland.

== Description ==
The stone is of Old Red Sandstone and bears two pictish symbols, the Pictish beast and the crescent and v-rod. It was formerly built into a wall south east of Strathmartine Castle, but moved to a property in Dundee in the early 20th century. It was acquired for Dundee Museums in 1969 and is now on display at the McManus Galleries in Dundee.
