= Clach an Tiompain =

Pictish stone in Easter Ross, Scotland

The Eagle Stone
- Clach an Tiompain
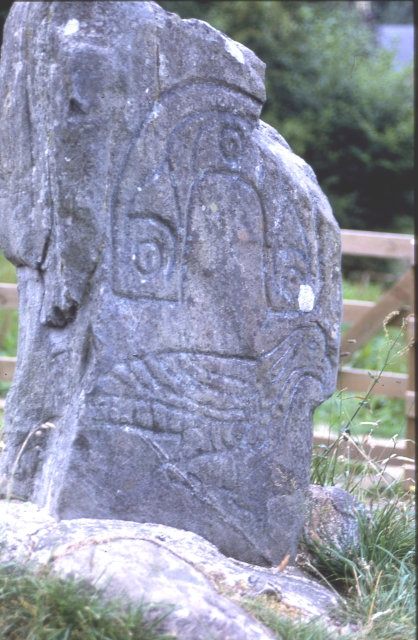
- Clach an Tiompain, Strathpeffer
- Material: Blue gneiss
- Height: 32 inches (81 cm)
- Width: 24 inches (61 cm)
- Symbols: Horseshoe; Eagle
- Created: 500-700AD
- Present location: Strathpeffer, Easter Ross grid ref NH48455852
- Coordinates: 57°35′29″N 4°32′8″W
- Classification: Class I incised stone
- Culture: Picto-Scottish

Clach an Tiompain (in English, the "Sounding Stone") or The Eagle Stone is a small Class I Pictish stone located on a hill on the northern outskirts of Strathpeffer in Easter Ross, Scotland.

== Description ==
The stone is made of blue gneiss and is 32 inches (81 cm) high, 24 inches (61 cm) wide, and 10 inches (25 cm) thick. Carved on the southeast side are two images, a horse shoe-like arc symbol above an eagle.

== History ==
The stone was originally located further down the hill, towards Dingwall, but was moved to its current site in 1411. One old tradition is that the stone marks the site of a Scottish clan battle that took place in 1411 between the Clan Munro and a branch of the Clan MacDonald, and that the stone commemorates a Munro victory as it is marked with their symbol, an eagle. According to Norman Macrae the stone was placed there by the Munros while marching against Donald of Islay, Lord of the Isles.

The stone is associated with the prophecies of the 16th century Brahan Seer (Scottish Gaelic: Coinneach Odhar). He predicted that if the stone fell three times, the surrounding valley would be flooded, and the stone used as an anchor.

It has since fallen twice, and is now set in concrete.
