= Pictish stone =

Monuments erected by early Scottish tribes

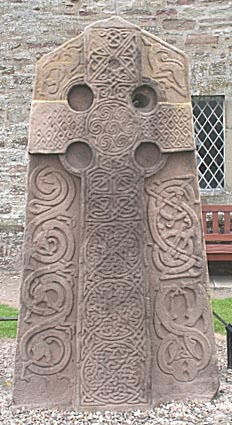
The Class II Kirkyard Stone c. 800 AD, in Aberlemno parish

A Pictish stone is a type of monumental stele, generally carved or incised with symbols or designs. A few have ogham inscriptions. Located in Scotland, mostly north of the Clyde-Forth line and on the Eastern side of the country, these stones are the most visible remaining evidence of the Picts and are thought to date from the 6th to 9th century, a period during which the Picts became Christianized. The earlier stones have no parallels from the rest of the British Isles, but the later forms are variations within a wider Insular tradition of monumental stones such as high crosses. About 350 objects classified as Pictish stones have survived, the earlier examples of which holding by far the greatest number of surviving examples of the mysterious symbols, which have long intrigued scholars.

== Classification ==
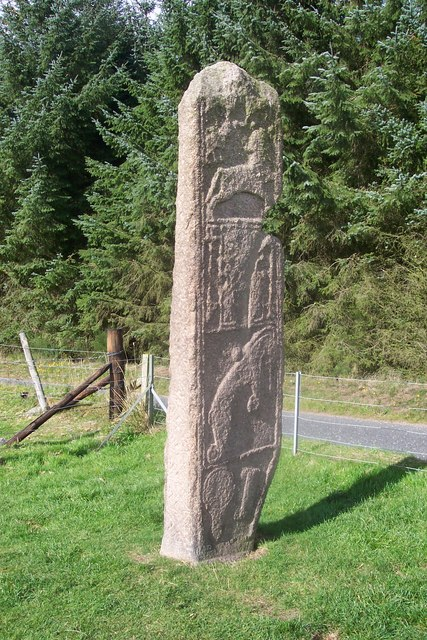
East face of Class II Maiden Stone

In The Early Christian Monuments of Scotland (1903) J Romilly Allen and Joseph Anderson first classified Pictish stones into three groups. Critics have noted weaknesses in this system but it is widely known and still used in the field. In particular, the classification may be misleading for the many incomplete stones. Allen and Anderson regarded their classes as coming from distinct periods in sequence, but it is now clear that there was a considerable period when both Class I and II stones were being produced.

- Class I – unworked stones with symbols only incised. There is no cross on either side. Class I stones date back to the 6th, 7th and 8th century.
- Class II – stones of more or less rectangular shape with a large cross and symbol(s) on one or both sides. The symbols, as well as Christian motifs, are carved in relief and the cross with its surroundings is filled with designs. Class II stones date from the 8th and 9th century.
- Class III – these stones feature no idiomatic Pictish symbols. The stones can be cross-slabs, recumbent gravemarkers, free-standing crosses, and composite stone shrines. They originate in the 8th or 9th century. Historic Scotland describes this class as "too simplistic" and says "Nowadays this is not considered a useful category. A surviving fragment may belong to a monument that did include Christian imagery".

Later Scottish stones merge into wider medieval British and European traditions.

== Purpose and meaning ==
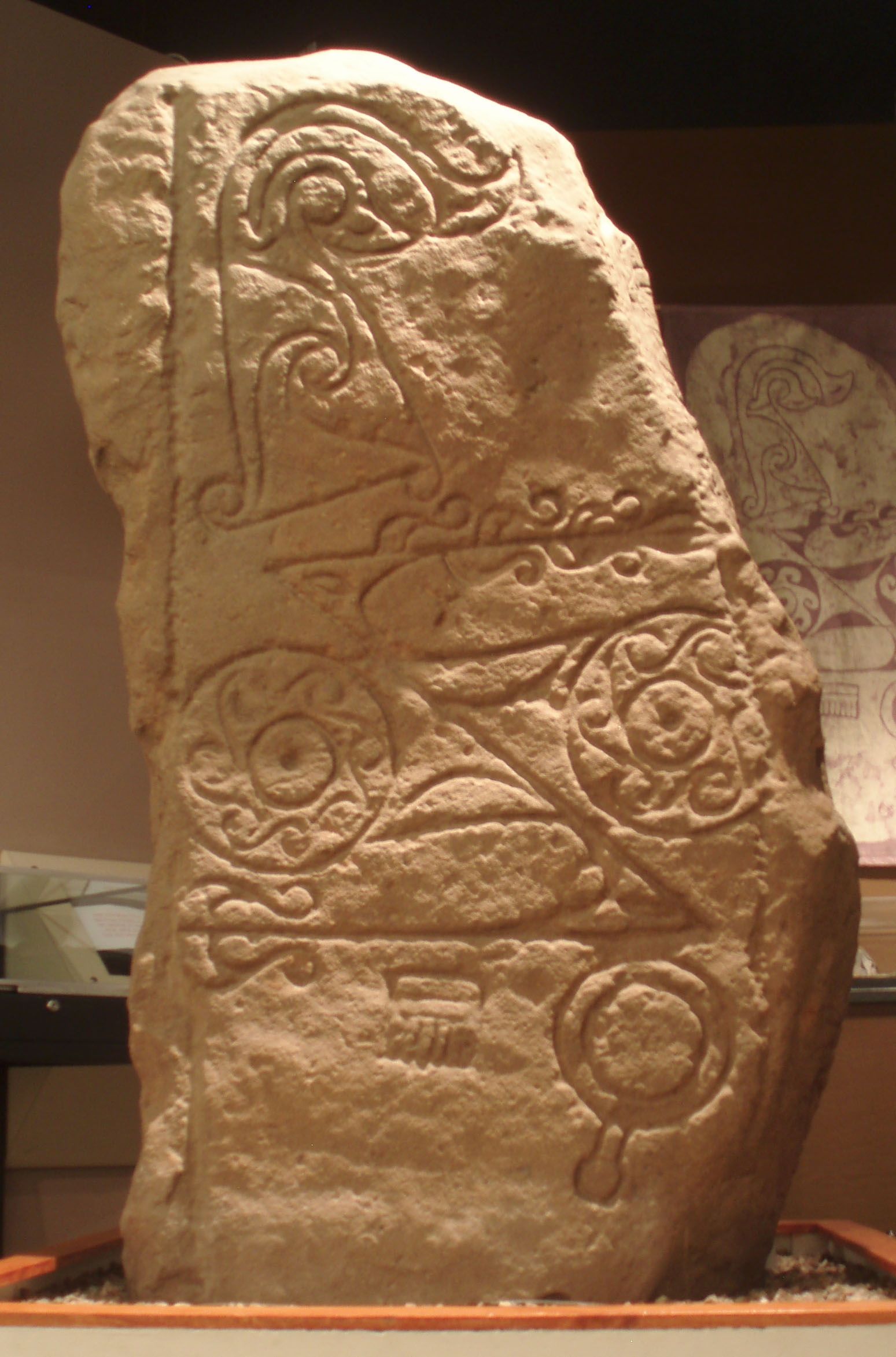
The Class I Dunnichen Stone, with Pictish symbols including the "double disc and Z-rod" at centre, and "mirror and comb" at the bottom

The purpose and meaning of the stones are only slightly understood, and the various theories proposed for the early Class I symbol stones, those that are considered to mostly pre-date the spread of Christianity to the Picts, are essentially speculative.

Many later Christian stones from Class II and Class III fall more easily into recognisable categories such as gravestones. The earlier symbol stones may have served as personal memorials or territorial markers, with symbols for individual names, clans, lineages or kindreds, although there are several other theories, and proposed explanations of the meanings of the symbols.

=== Standard ideograms ===
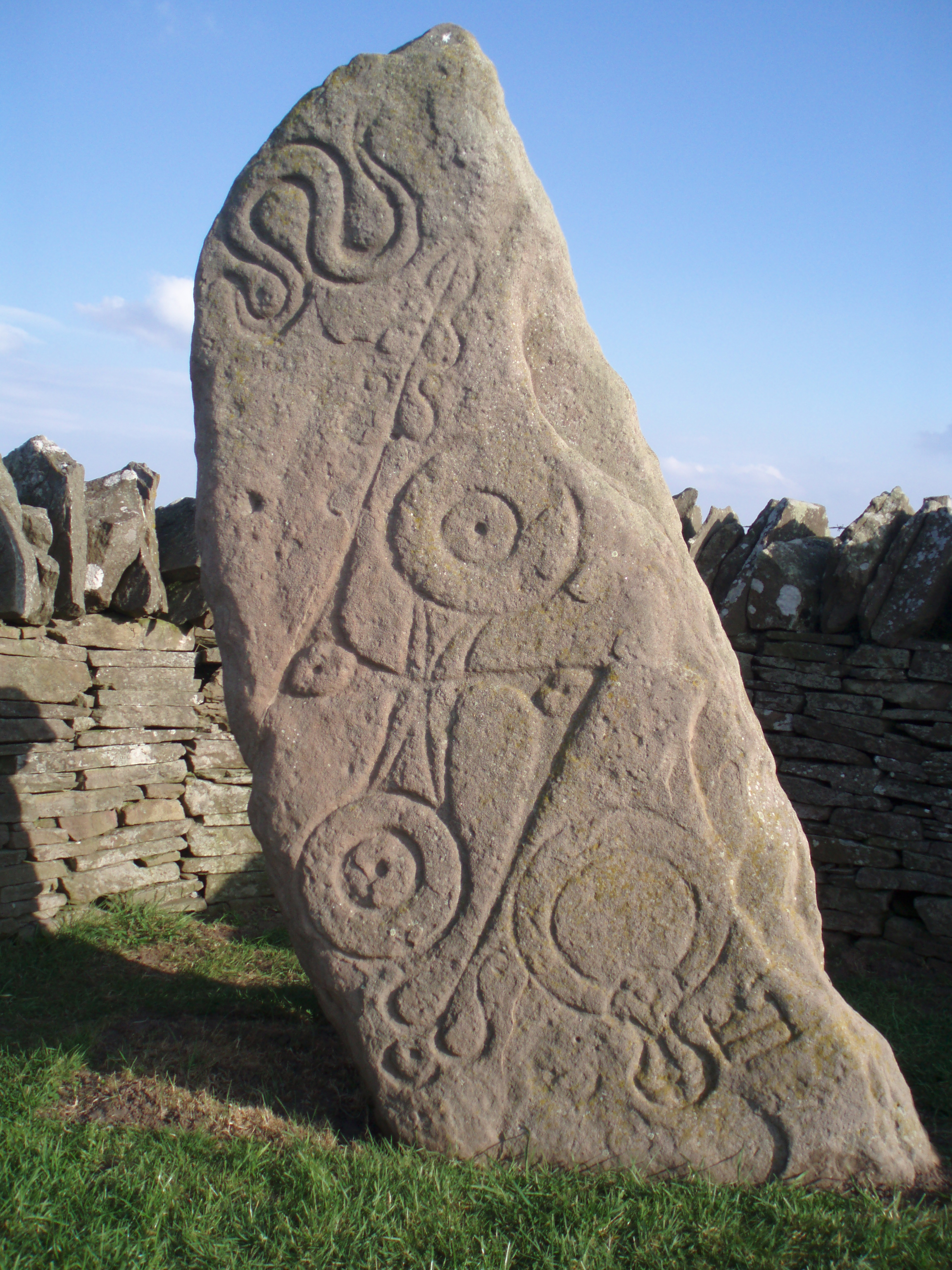
Aberlemno 1; Class I

Class I and II stones contain symbols from a recognisable set of standard ideograms, many unique to Pictish art, which are known as the Pictish symbols. The exact number of distinct Pictish symbols is uncertain, as there is some debate as to what constitutes a Pictish symbol, and whether some varied forms should be counted together or separately. The more inclusive estimates are in excess of sixty different symbols, but a more typical estimate is "around thirty", or "around forty" according to Historic Scotland.

These include geometric symbols, which have been assigned descriptive names by researchers such as:

- "crescent and v-rod" (see Drainie 1, Hilton of Cadboll Stone, Rosemarkie 1, Aberlemno 3, Meigle 4).
- "double disc and Z-rod" (see Edderton, Dunnichen Stone, Rodney's Stone, Eassie Stone, Monifieth 1, St Vigean's 1, 3, 5 and 6).
- "mirror and comb" (or "mirror" alone) (see Maiden Stone, Hilton of Cadboll, Fyvie, Glamis Manse Stone, Kirriemuir 1).
- "triple disc"

Other symbols outline representations of animals such as:

- adder
- salmon
- wolf
- stag
- eagle
- Pictish Beast (apparently mythical – perhaps intended as a sea monster).

Some are representations of everyday objects, such as the "mirror and comb", which could have been used by high-status Picts. The symbols are almost always arranged in pairs or sets of pairs, often with the object type, such as the mirror and comb, below the others, and the animals are generally found only in combination with the abstract types. Hence some think they could represent names, lineage, or kinships, such as the clans of two parents, analogous to the Japanese mon. According to Anthony Jackson the symbol pairs represent matrilineal marriage alliances.

=== Finds and associations ===
A small number of Pictish stones have been found associated with burials, but most are not in their original locations. Some later stones may also have marked tribal or lineage territories. Some were re-used for other purposes, such as the two Congash Stones near Grantown-on-Spey, now placed as portal stones for an old graveyard. The shaft of an old cross is lying in the field.

Another Pictish stone, the Dunachton Stone near Kincraig, was later used as a door lintel in a barn. This was discovered when the building was dismantled in 1870. The stone was re-erected in the field. Recently it fell, after being photographed in 2007, but was re-erected again a few years later by the owner of Dunachton Lodge.

The symbols are found on some of the extremely rare survivals of Pictish jewellery, such as the pair of silver plaques from the Norrie's Law hoard found in Fife in the early 19th century, and the Whitecleuch Chain.

The symbols are also sometimes found on other movable objects like small stone discs and bones mostly from the Northern Isles. Simple or early forms of the symbols are carved on the walls of coastal caves at East Wemyss, Fife and Covesea, Moray. It is therefore thought likely that they were represented in other more perishable forms that have not survived in the archaeological record, perhaps including clothing and tattoos. Some symbols appear across the whole geographical range of the stones while, for example, six stones with the single symbol of a bull found at Burghead Fort suggest that this represented the place itself, or its owners, despite other examples appearing elsewhere.

=== Exeter analysis ===
A team from Exeter University, using mathematical analysis, have concluded that the symbols in the Pictish image stones "exhibit the characteristics of written languages" (as opposed to "random or sematographic (heraldic) characters").

The Exeter analysts' claim has been criticized by linguists Mark Liberman and Richard Sproat on the grounds that the non-uniform distribution of symbols – taken to be evidence of writing – is little different from non-linguistic non-uniform distributions (such as die rolls), and that the Exeter team are using a definition of writing broader than that used by linguists.

To date, even those who propose that the symbols should be considered "writing" from this mathematical approach do not have a suggested decipherment. Although earlier studies based on a contextual approach, postulating the identification of the pagan "pre-Christian Celtic Cult of the Archer Guardian", have suggested possible clausal meanings for symbol pairs.

== Gallery of symbols ==
A selection of the Pictish symbols, showing the variation between individual examples. Each group is classified as a single type by most researchers. Only the geometric and object types are represented here, not the animal group.

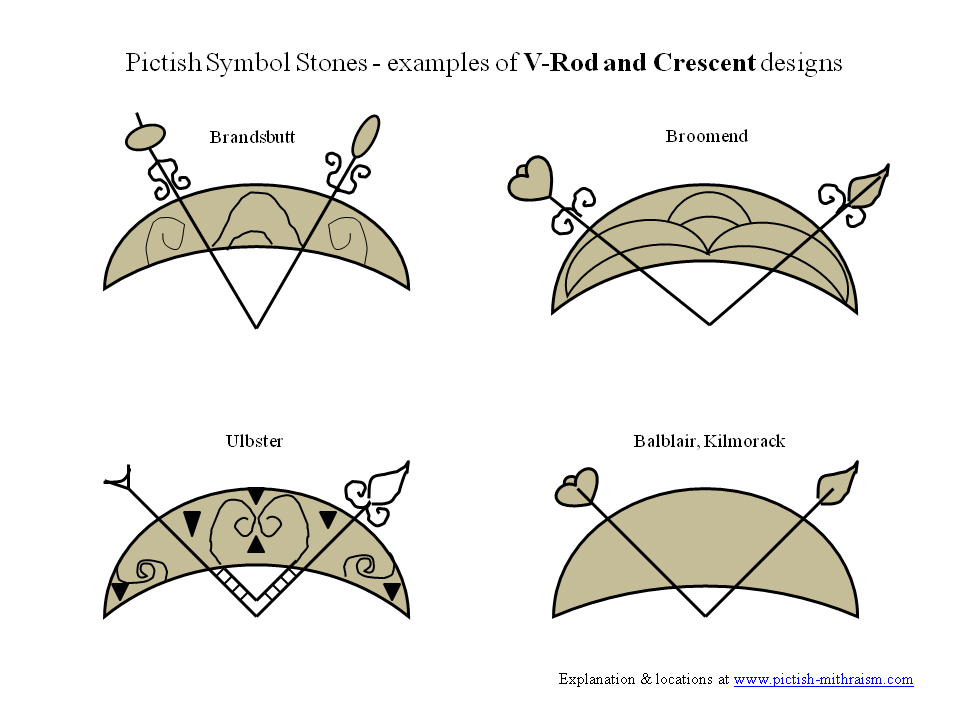
Pictish Symbol Stones, V-Rod with Crescent design

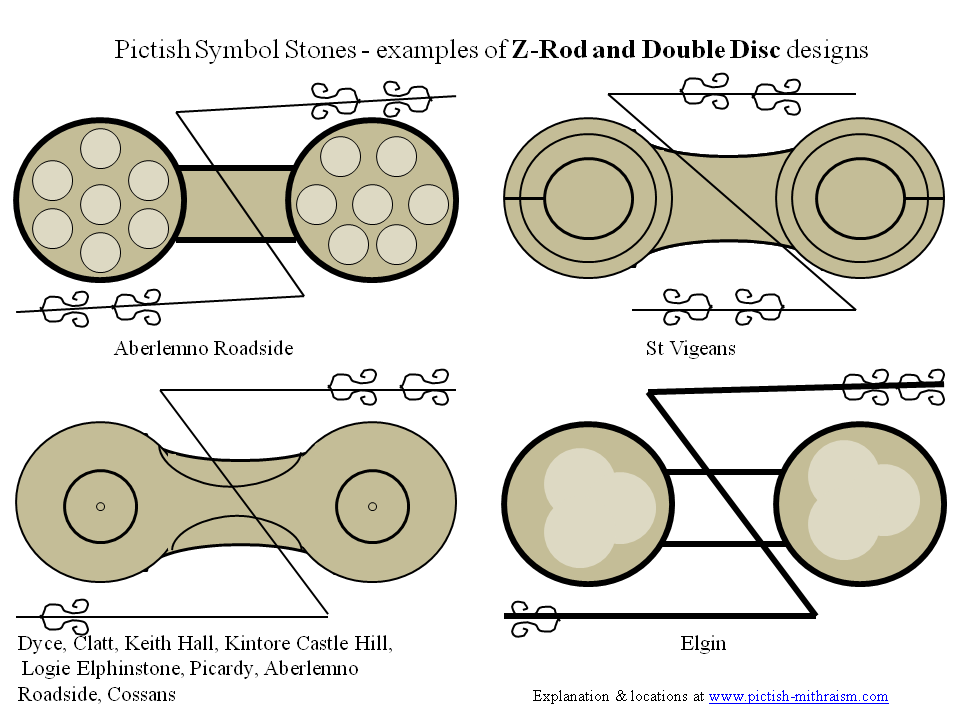
Pictish Symbol Stones, Z-Rod with Double Disc design

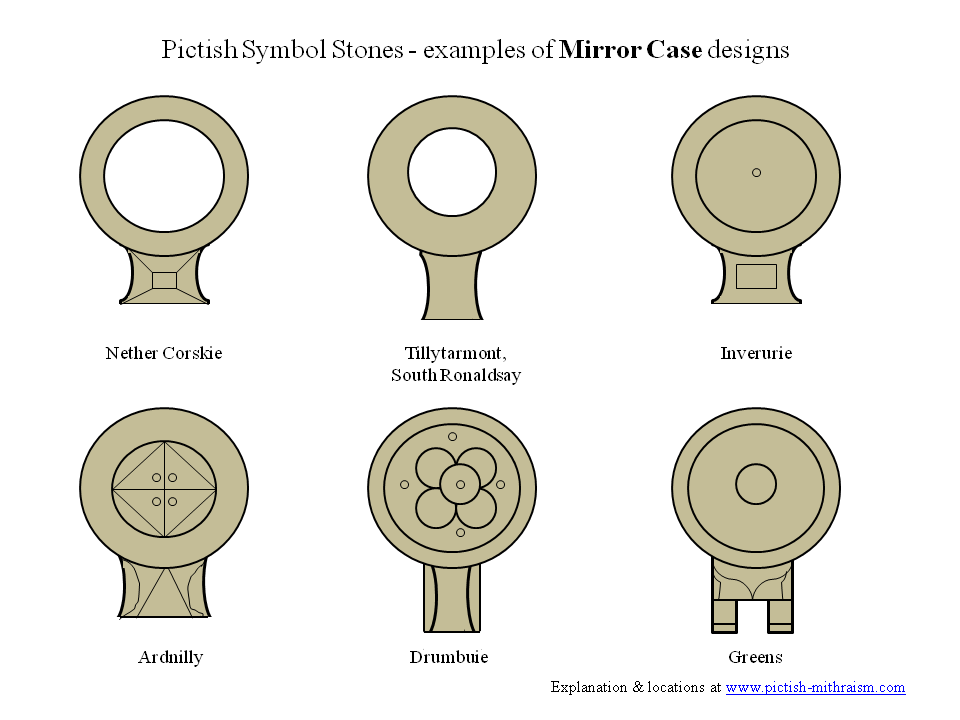
Pictish Symbol Stones, 'Mirror Case' design

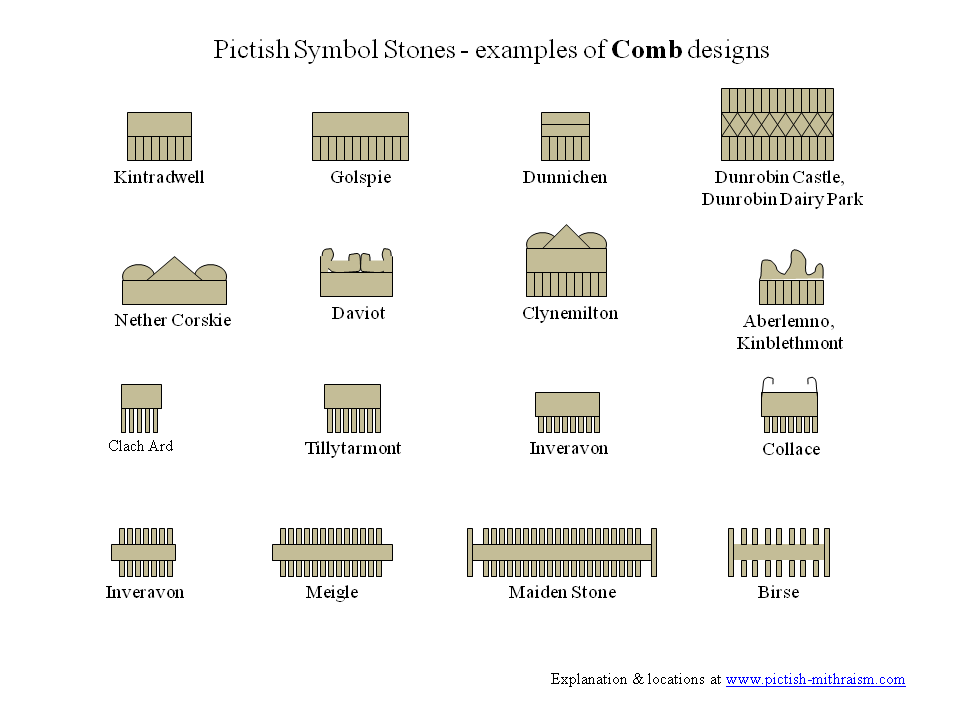
Pictish Symbol Stones, 'Comb' design

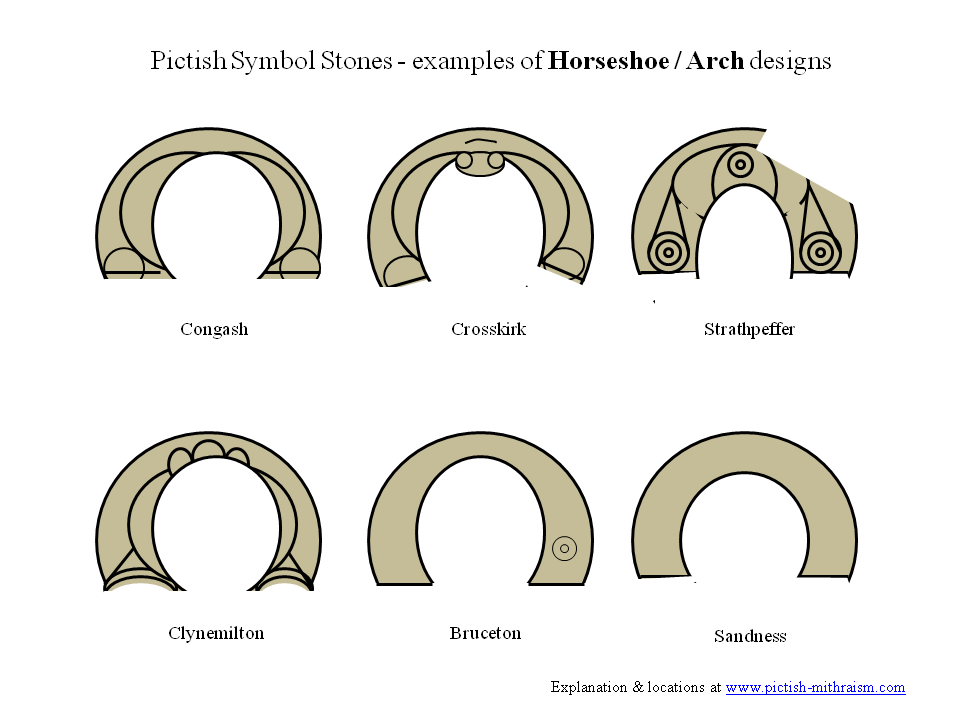
Pictish Symbol Stones, Horseshoe/Arch design

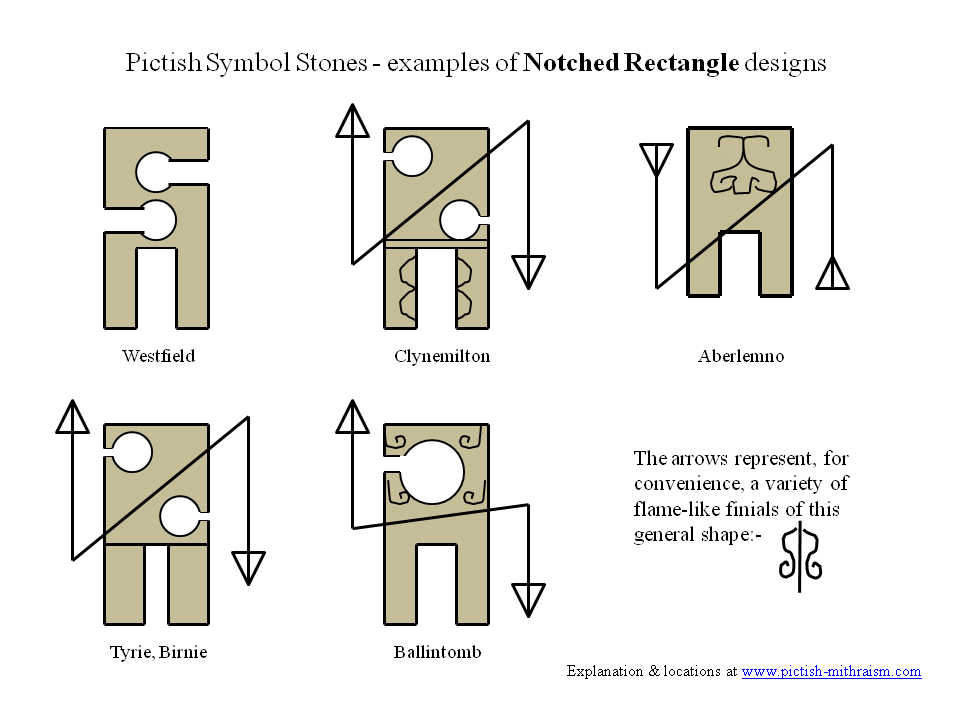
Pictish Symbol Stones, Notched Rectangle design

== Distribution and sites ==
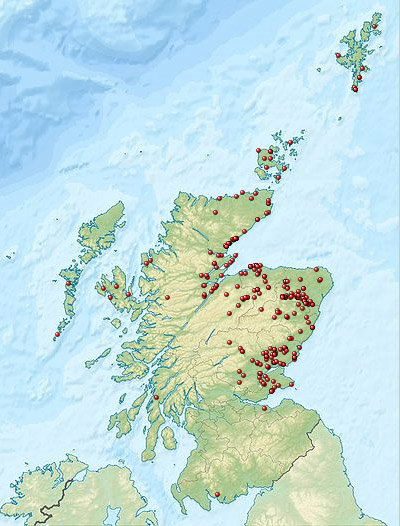
Distribution of Class I and Class II stones, as well as caves holding Pictish symbol graffiti

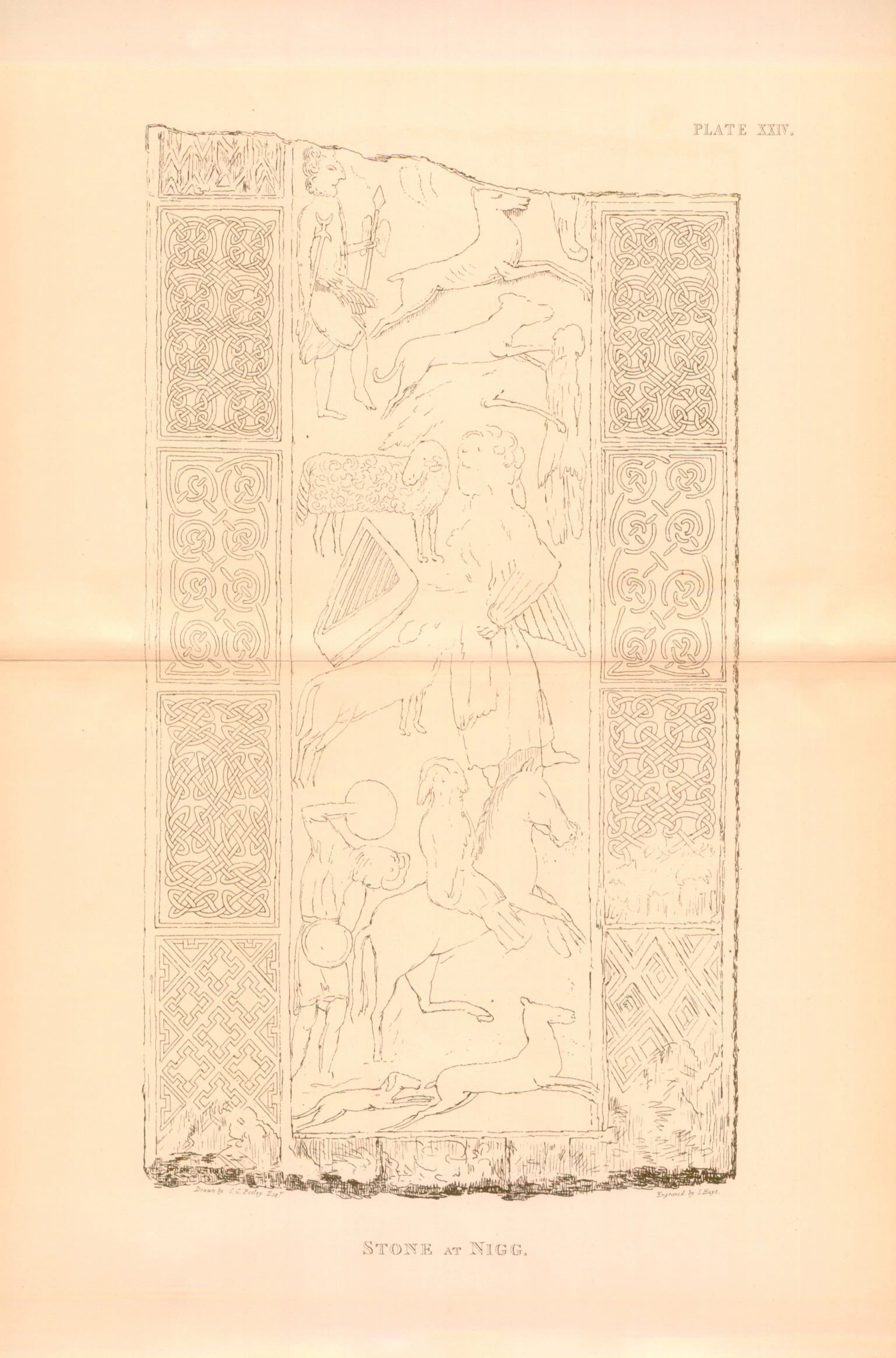
The Nigg Stone, 790–799 AD, Class II, shows a Pictish harp, beasts and warriors in a 19th-century illustration, minus the top section.

Only a few stones still stand at their original sites; most have been moved to museums or other protected sites. Some of the more notable individual examples and collections are listed below (Note that listing is no guarantee of unrestricted access, since some lie on private land). Pictish Symbol stones have been found throughout Scotland, although their original locations are concentrated largely in the North East of the country in lowland areas, the Pictish heartland. During the period when the stones were being created, Christianity was spreading through Scotland from the west and the south, through the kingdoms of Dál Riata, which included parts of Ireland, and the extension into modern Scotland of the Anglo-Saxon kingdoms of Bernicia and Northumbria.

Areas that show particular concentrations include Strathtay, Strathmore, coastal Angus, Fife, Strathdee, Garioch, Moray, Strathspey, Caithness, Easter Ross, the Hebrides, Orkney and Shetland.

Three stones with Pictish symbols are known outside areas normally recognised as Pictish: in Dunadd, Argyll; Trusty's Hill in Dumfries and Galloway; and Edinburgh in Lothian. All three are located at major royal power centres.

Two Pictish Class I stones are known to have been removed from Scotland. These are Burghead 5 from Burghead Fort in Moray, showing the figure of a bull, now in the British Museum, and the Crosskirk stone (Caithness), presented to the King of Denmark in the 19th century, but whose location is currently unknown.

=== Class I ===
- Aberlemno 1 (The serpent stone), Aberlemno, Angus. Boxed during winter months.
- Brandsbutt Stone in Inverurie – Class I stone
- Churchyard Stone, Strathpeffer – Class I stone
- Clach a'Mheirlich, Rosskeen – Class I stone in a field.
- Craw Stane, a six-foot-high Class I stone on top of a hill near Rhynie. A salmon and Pictish Beast are carved on the south-facing side.
- Dingwall Stone in Dingwall – Class I stone
- Dunnichen Stone, a class I stone found at Dunnichen, Angus, now on display at the Meffan Institute in Forfar. A replica stands at its former position in front of Dunnichen church.
- Eagle Stone (Clach an Tiompain), Strathpeffer Class I stone.
- Inverness Museum, Castle Wynd, Inverness – collection of eight Class I stones, including the Ardross Wolf and Deer's Head (two of the finest surviving animal symbols, probably originally parts of the same slab), and a fragment that matches a piece in Dunrobin Castle.
- Kincardine Old Church, Ardgay – coffin-shaped monument.
- Knocknagael Boar Stone, Highland Council Headquarters, Glenurquhart Street, Inverness – Class I stone to be seen through a large window. Found at Knocknagael on the outskirts of Inverness.
- Rhynie Man, Woodhill House, Westburn Road in Aberdeen – Class I stone.
- Sharp Stone (Clach Biorach), Edderton – Class I stone in a field (probable original position), viewable from the roadside.
- Tain and District Museum, Tain – Class I stone in the yard and fragments from Edderton churchyard and Nigg in the museum.
- Tarbat Discovery Centre, Portmahomack – large collection of excavated fragments and information about the Picts.
- Tote Stone (Clach Ard), Tote on the Isle of Skye – Class I stone in small fenced enclosure.

=== Class II ===
- Aberlemno 2 (The kirkyard stone) – in the churchyard at Aberlemno, Angus. Boxed during winter months.
- Aberlemno 3 (The great stone) – at the roadside, Aberlemno, Angus. Boxed during winter months.
- Drosten Stone – Rare example of a Pictish stone with an inscription in Latin text. At St Vigeans, Angus.
- Dunfallandy Stone (Clach an t-Sagairt, 'The Priest's Stone'), Pitlochry – fine Class II stone (Historic Scotland).
- Eassie Stone, stands in the ruined church at Eassie.
- Groam House Museum, Rosemarkie – collection of fragments of Pictish stones and a Class II cross-slab. The museum also has a collection of photographs of Pictish stones in Scotland.
- Fordoun Stone, in the vestibule of Fordoun parish church, Auchenblae there is a Class II 'Pictish' cross-slab which had been used as the base of the pulpit of the church of 1788. The face bears a Latin cross, part of a 'sea monster', a double-disc and Z-rod, a hunting scene with three horsemen and dogs, and two inscriptions, one in Hiberno-Saxon minuscules (on the face) and the other in Ogam (on the edge).
- Hilton of Cadboll Stone, now in the National Museum, with a replica at the original site. One of the finest pictorial stones
- Kirriemuir Sculptured Stones, now on display at the Meffan Institute in Forfar.
- Maiden Stone, at the roadside in Aberdeenshire. Boxed during winter months.
- Nigg Stone, Nigg inside the former parish church – Class II cross-slab. A fragment of it can be found in Tain Museum
- Shandwick Stone, Shandwick – Class II cross-slab protected by glass shelter.
- St Orland's Stone, near Kirriemuir, Angus.
- Woodwrae Stone, from Woodwrae, Angus, now at Museum of Scotland, Edinburgh

=== Class III ===
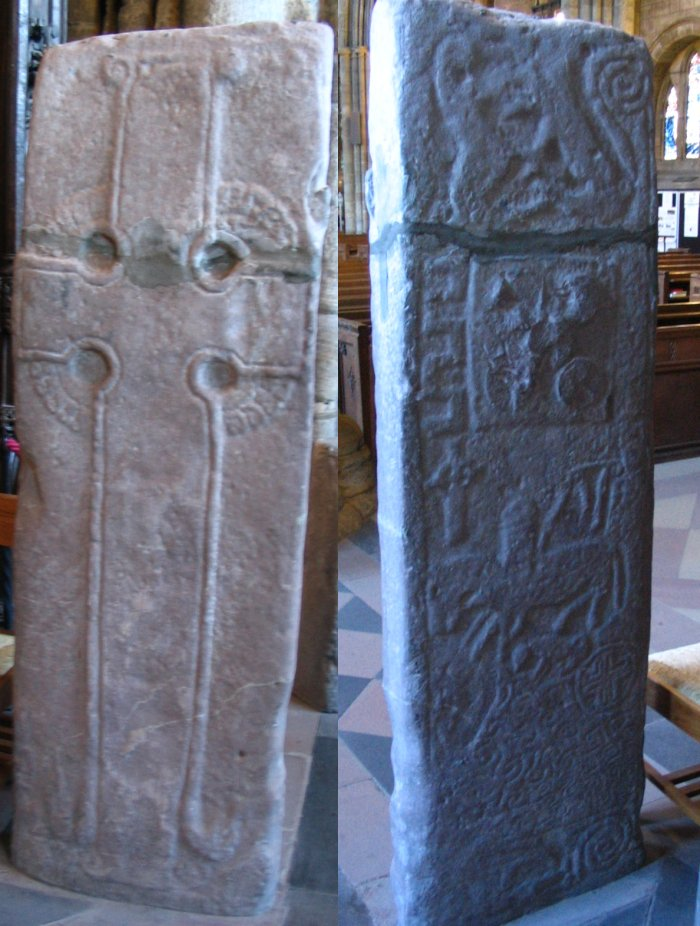
Class III Pictish stone in Dunblane Cathedral

- The Camus Cross, high cross near Carnoustie.
- The Dupplin Cross high cross at St Serf's Church, Dunning.
- Dunblane Cathedral, Dunblane – this Class III stone was found in the foundations of Dunblane Cathedral during restoration. It can be found inside the cathedral.
- Sueno's Stone, Forres – 6.5m-high cross-slab (tallest in Scotland) dating from 9th or 10th century protected by glass (Historic Scotland).

=== Collections ===
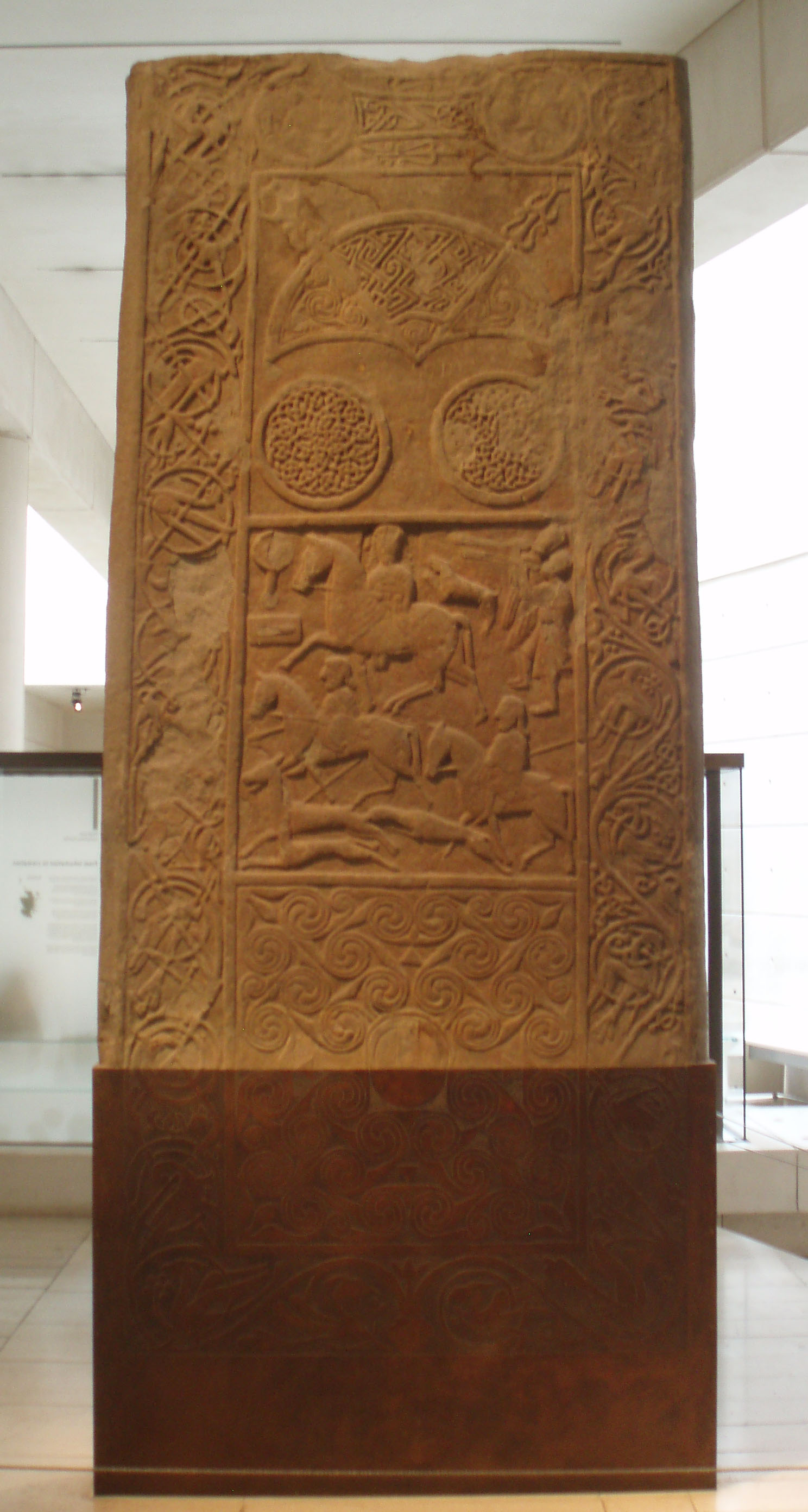
The Hilton of Cadboll Stone in the Museum of Scotland

- Dunrobin Castle Museum, Golspie – collection of over 20 Class I and II Pictish stones collected by the Dukes of Sutherland.
- Elgin Museum, High St, Elgin – large collection, largely from Kinneddar churchyard.
- McManus Galleries, Dundee. Collection of class I and III stones.
- The Meffan Institute, Forfar
- Meigle Sculptured Stone Museum, Meigle, near Forfar
- Museum of Scotland, Edinburgh
- Montrose Museum
- Perth Museum, Perth – collection of three Pictish stones, St Madoes 1, Inchyra and Gellyburn.
- Pictavia, near Brechin
- St Vigeans Museum, Arbroath – collection of Pictish and medieval stones. Includes the Drosten Stone, a Class II cross-slab, one of only two Pictish symbol-stones to carry a non-ogham inscription. Key from Arbroath Abbey or keyholder in village (Historic Scotland).

== Gallery of stones ==
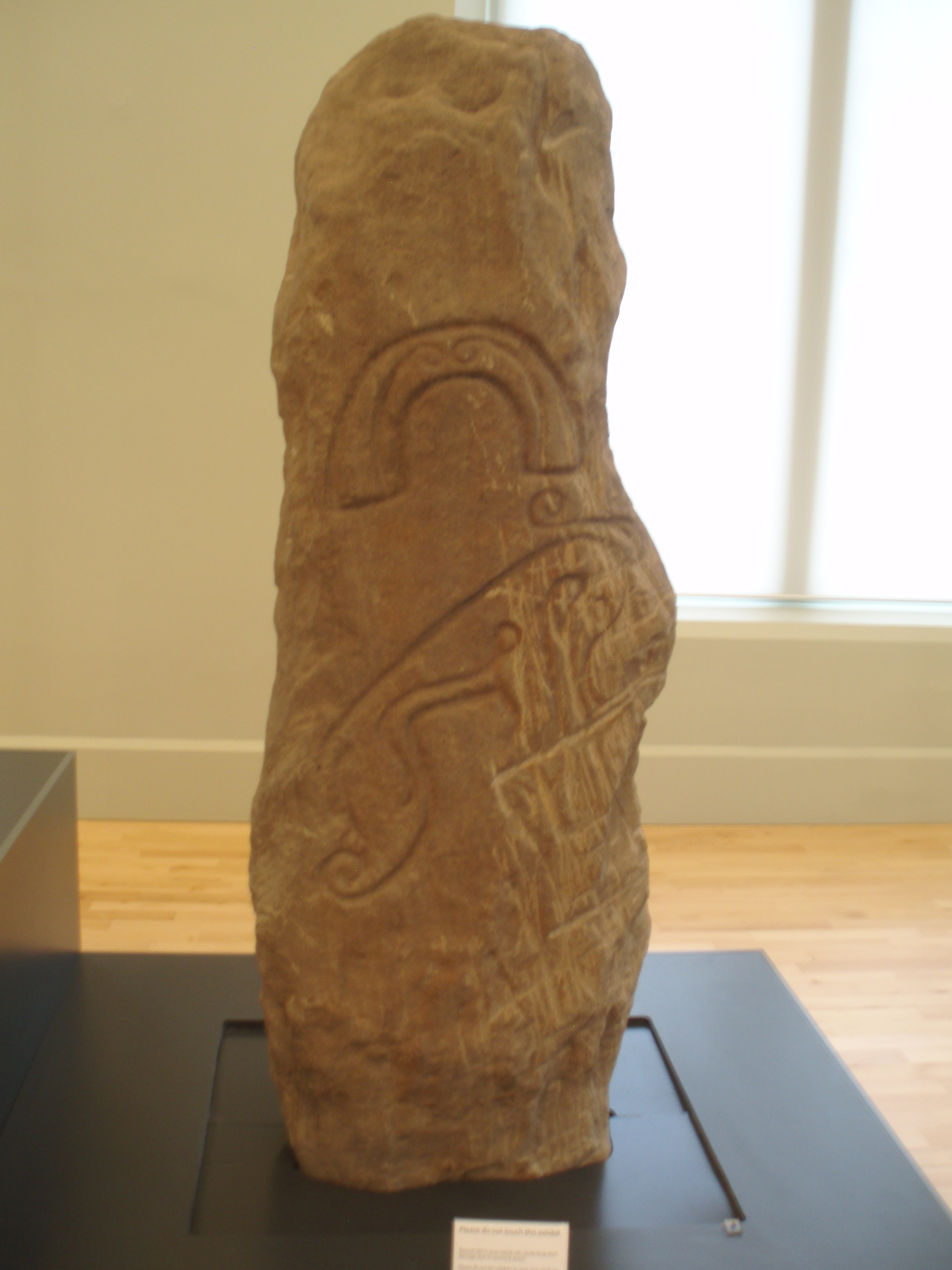
Aberlemno 4; Class I

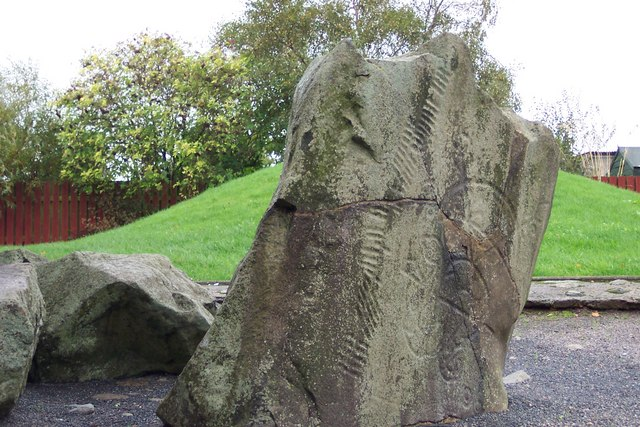
Brandsbutt Stone; Class I with ogham inscription

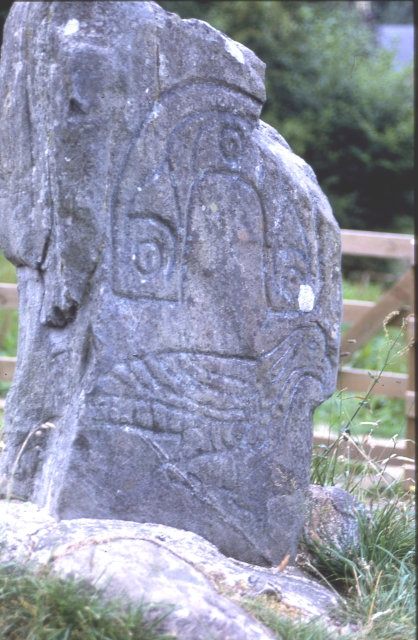
Eagle Stone; Class I

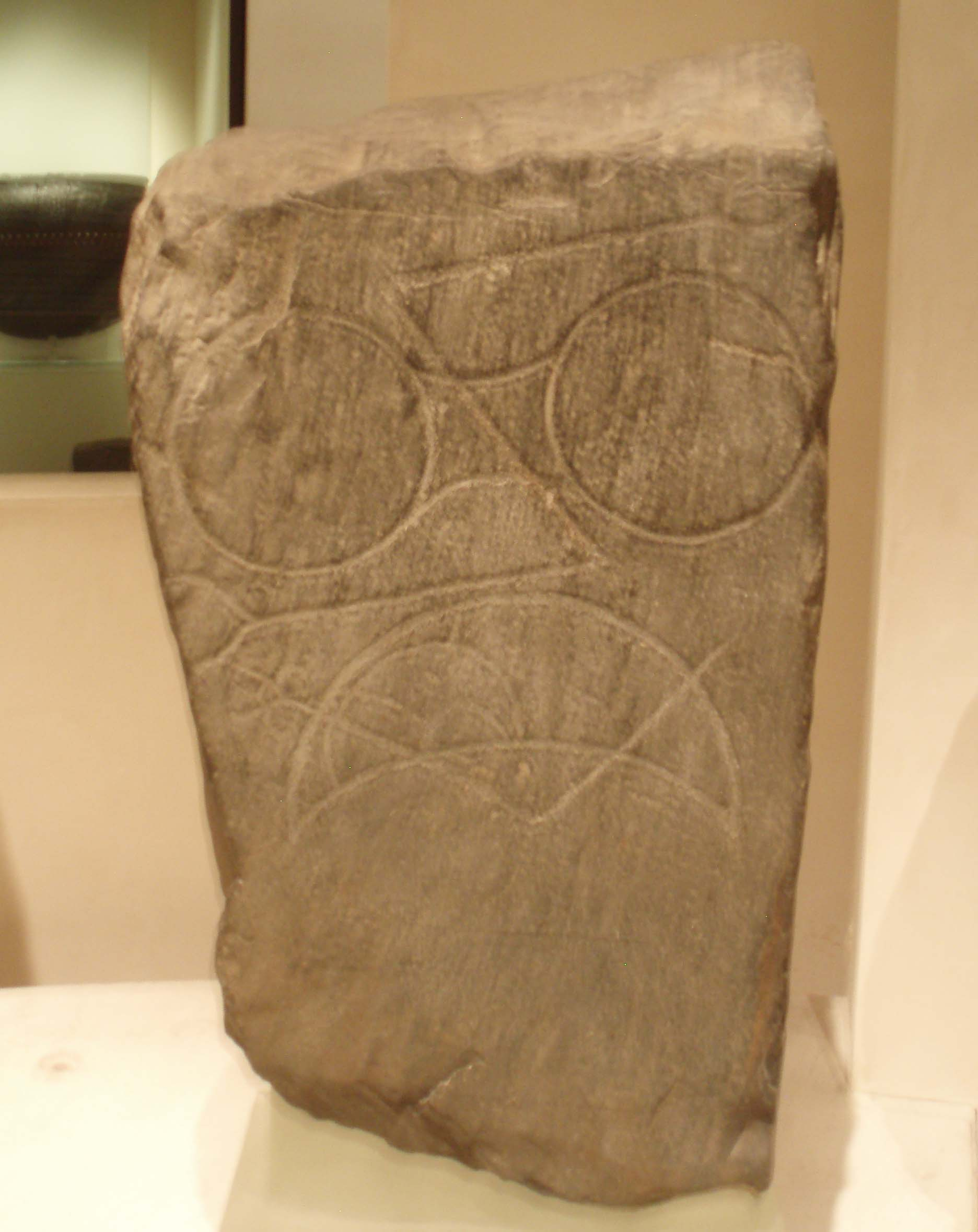
Fiskavaig Stone; Class I

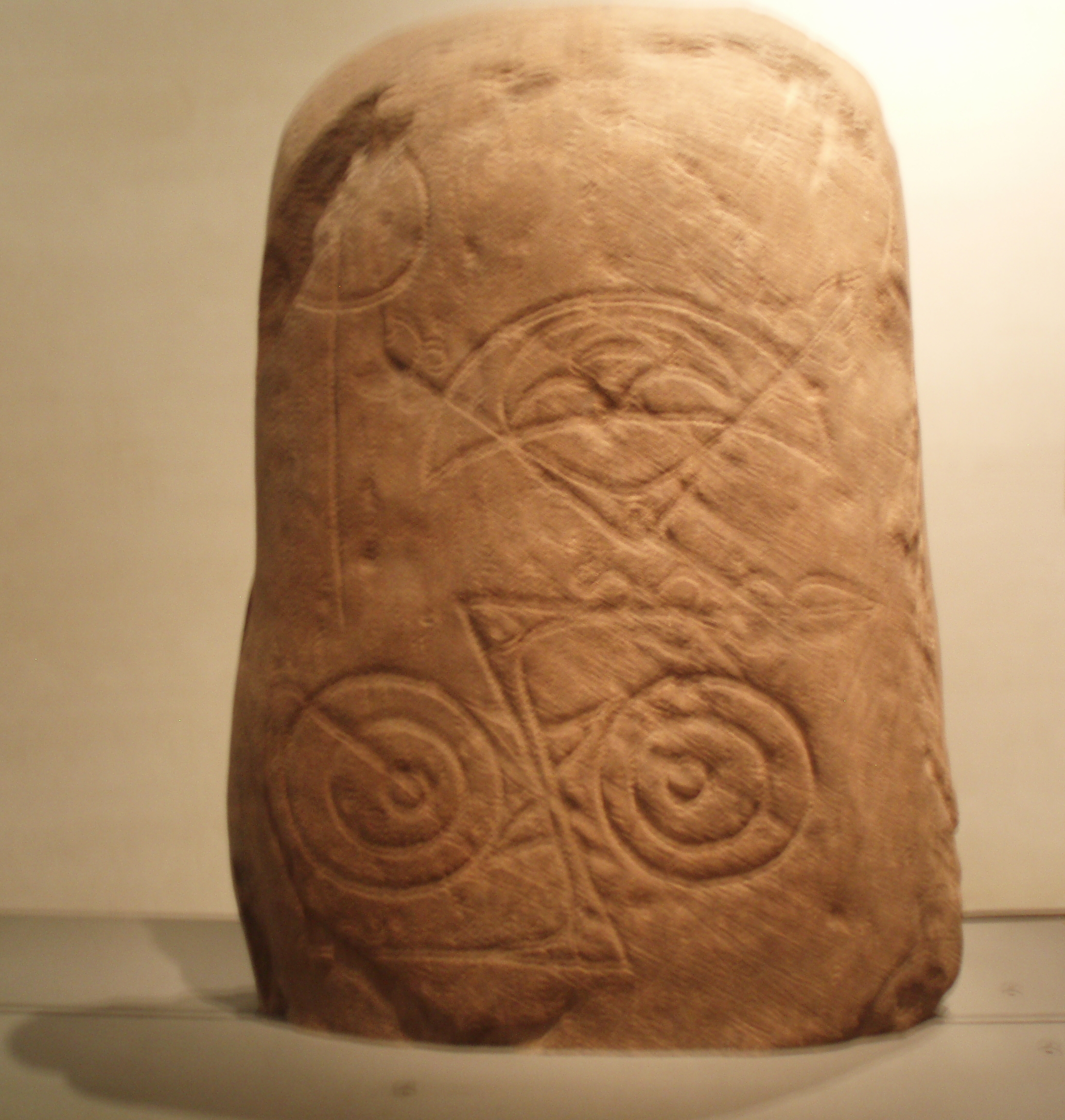
Invereen Stone; Class I

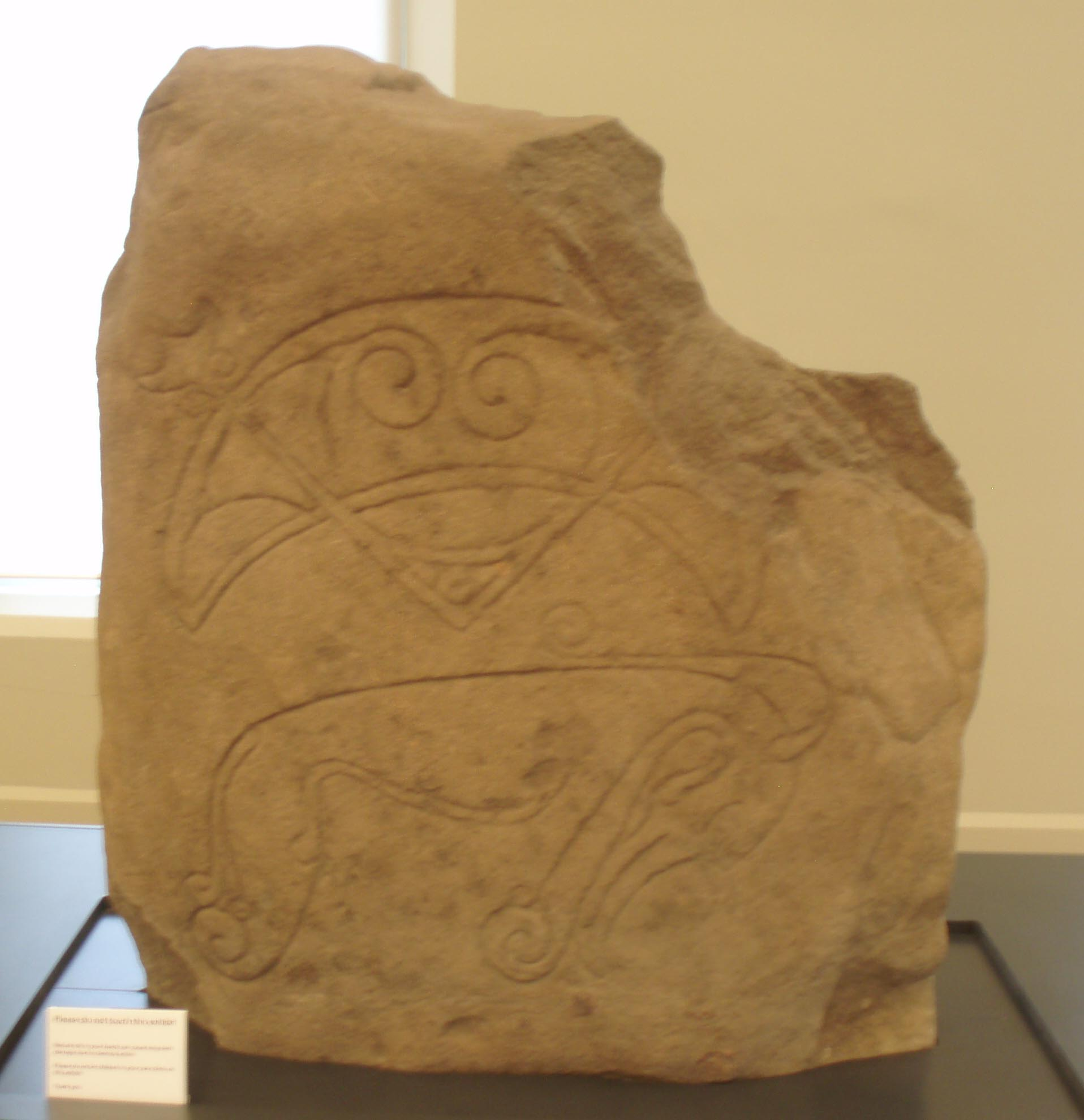
Strathmartine Castle Stone; Class I

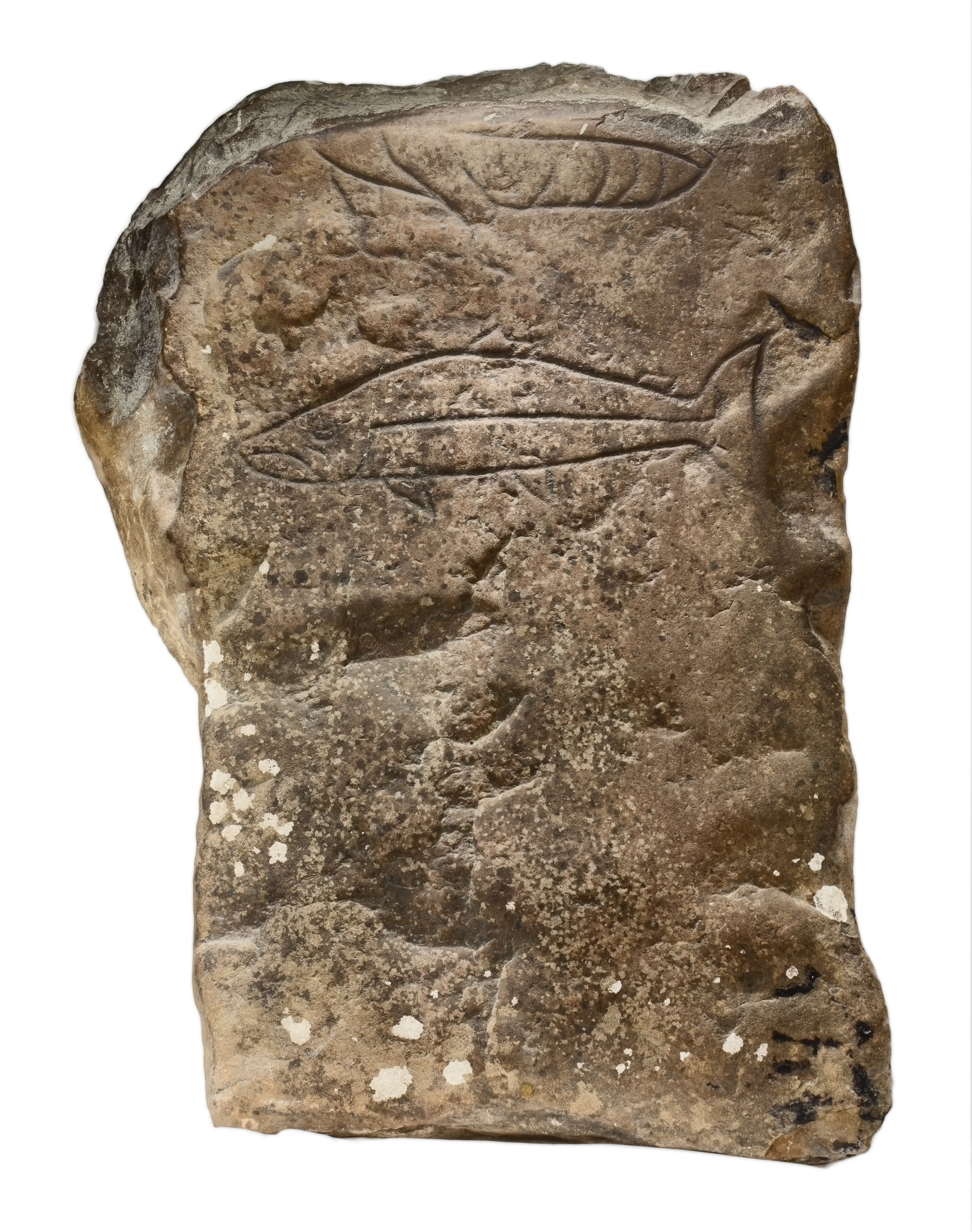
Gairloch Stone; Class I

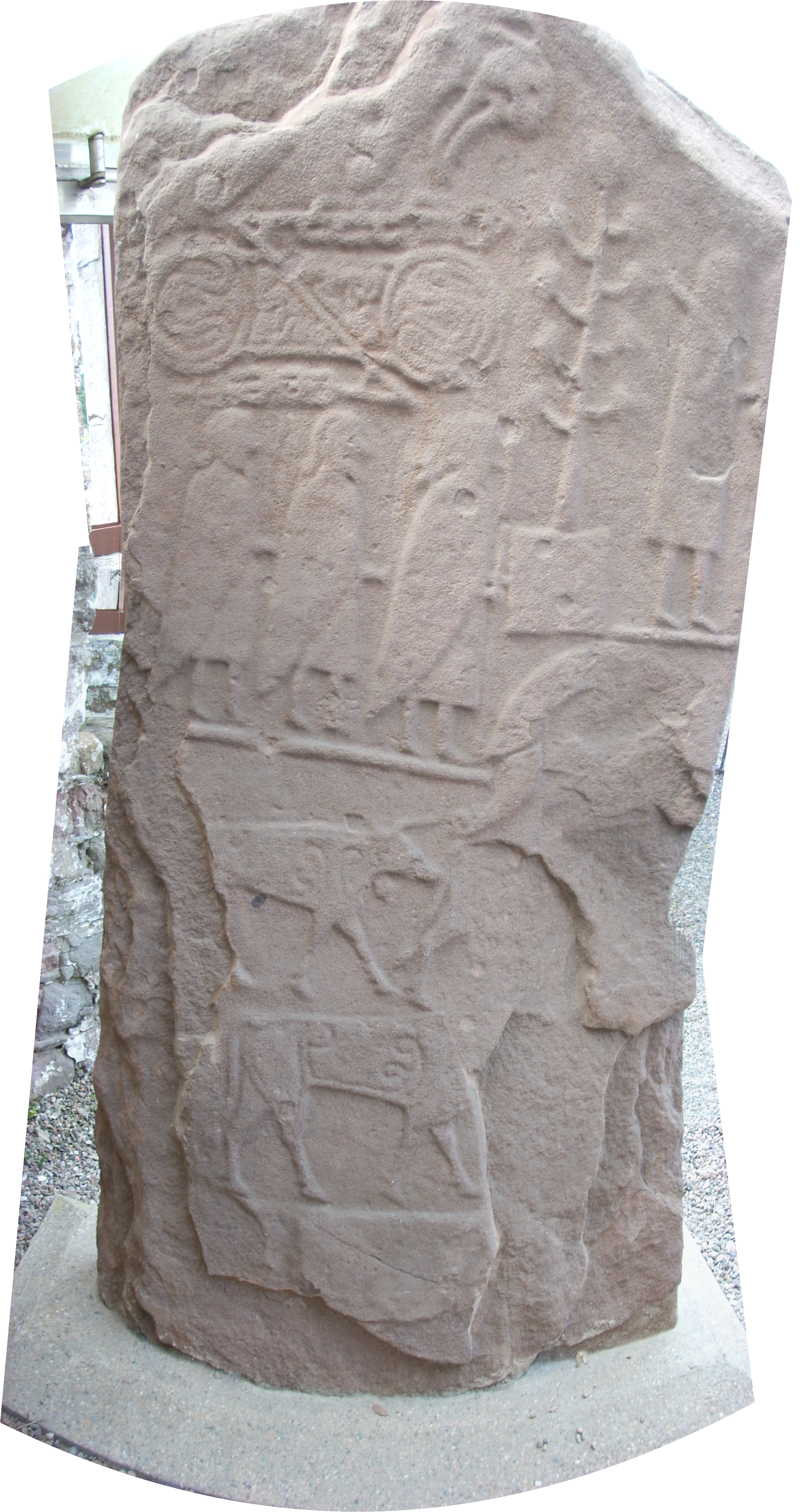
Eassie Stone; Class II

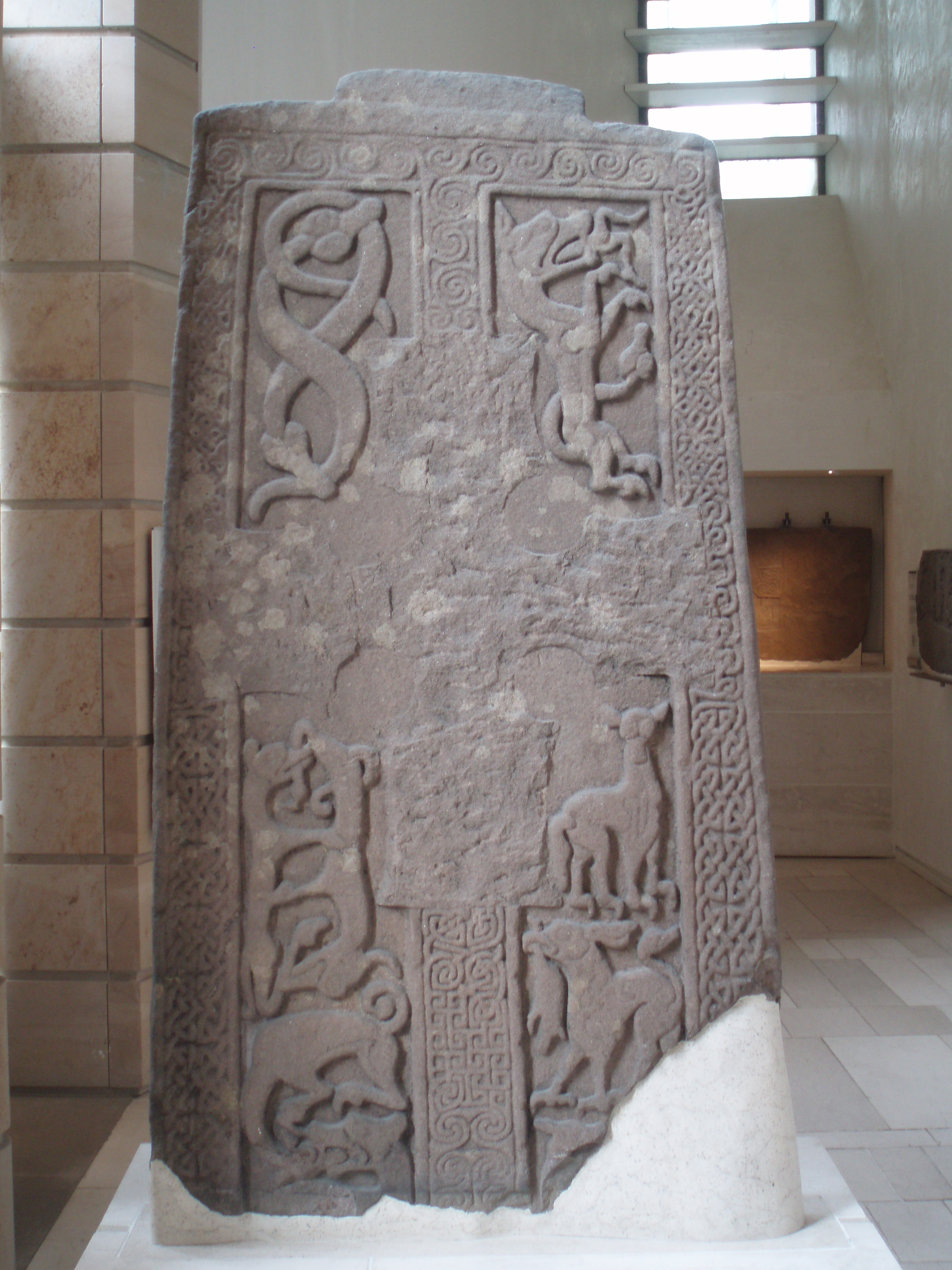
Woodwrae Stone; Class II

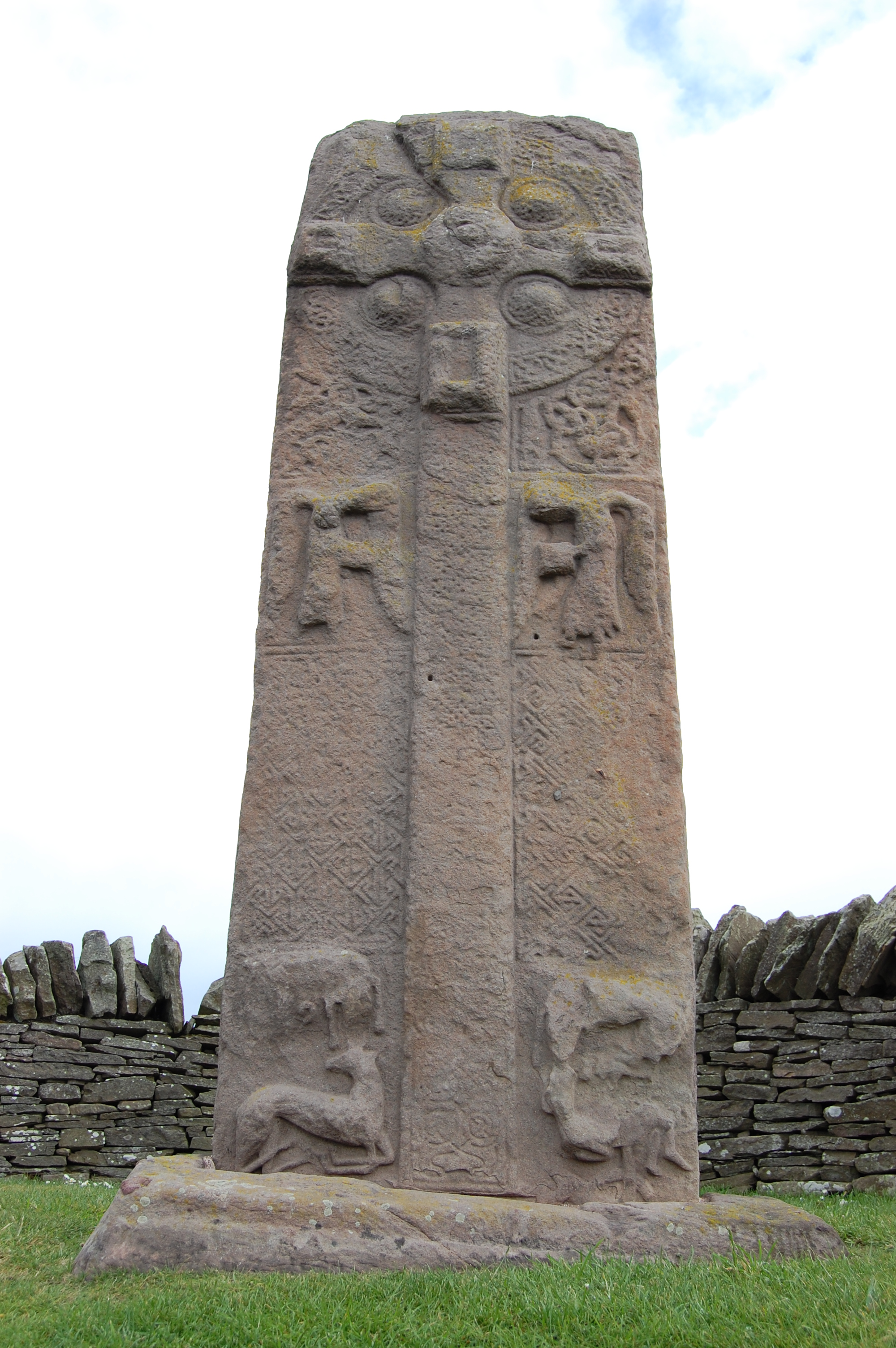
Aberlemno 3, front face; Class II

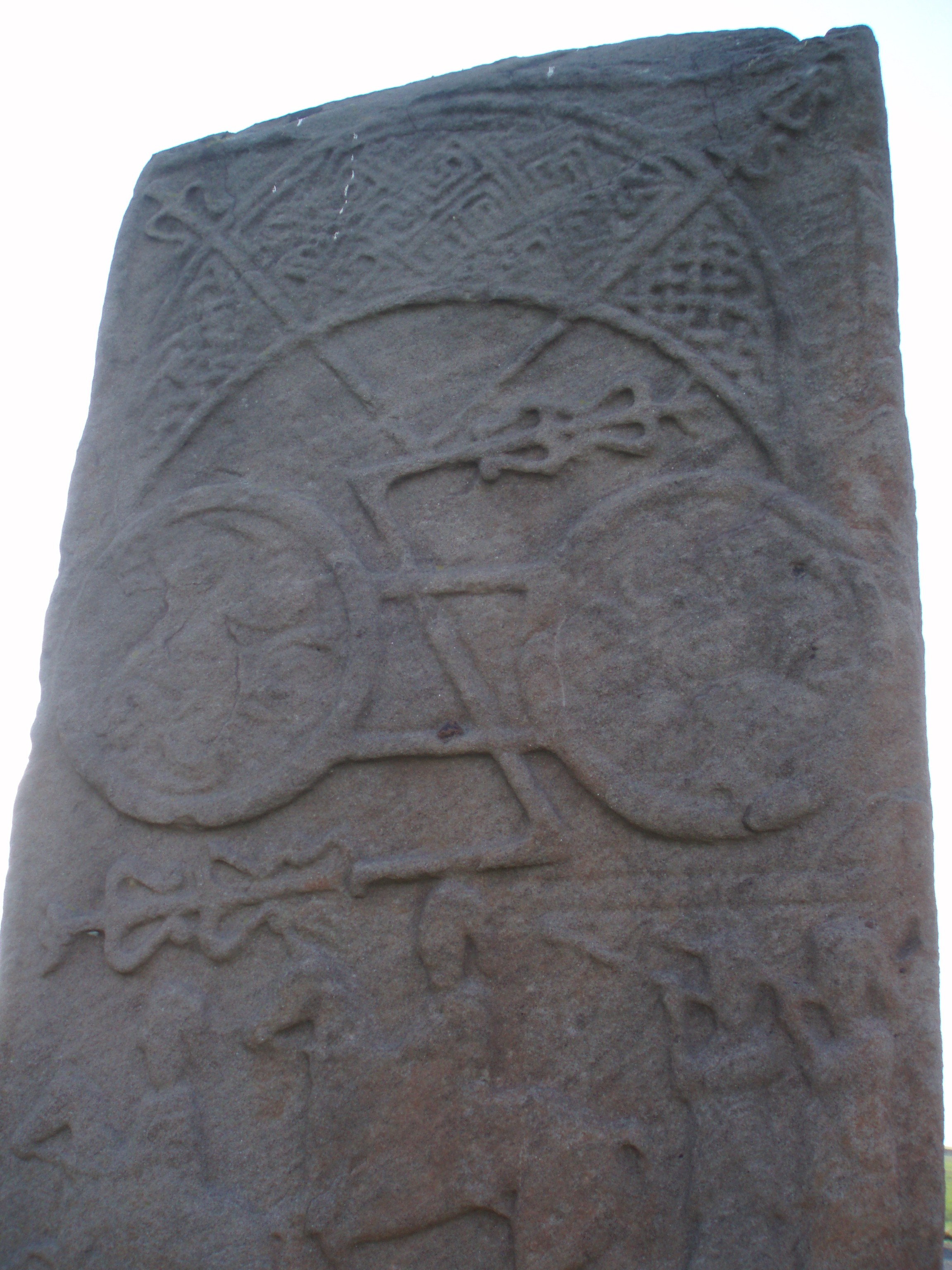
Aberlemno 3 rear face detail; Class II

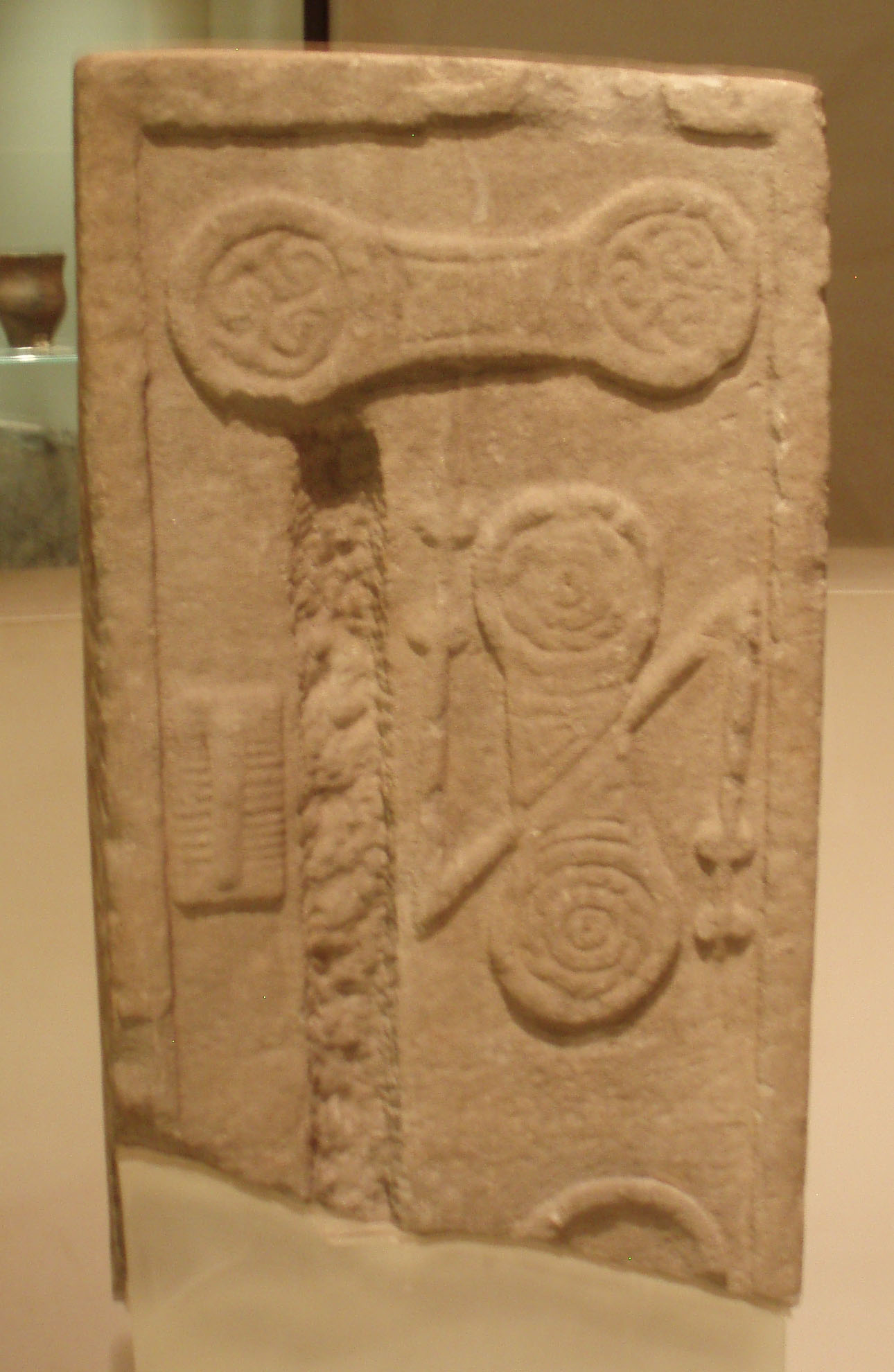
Monifieth 1; Class II

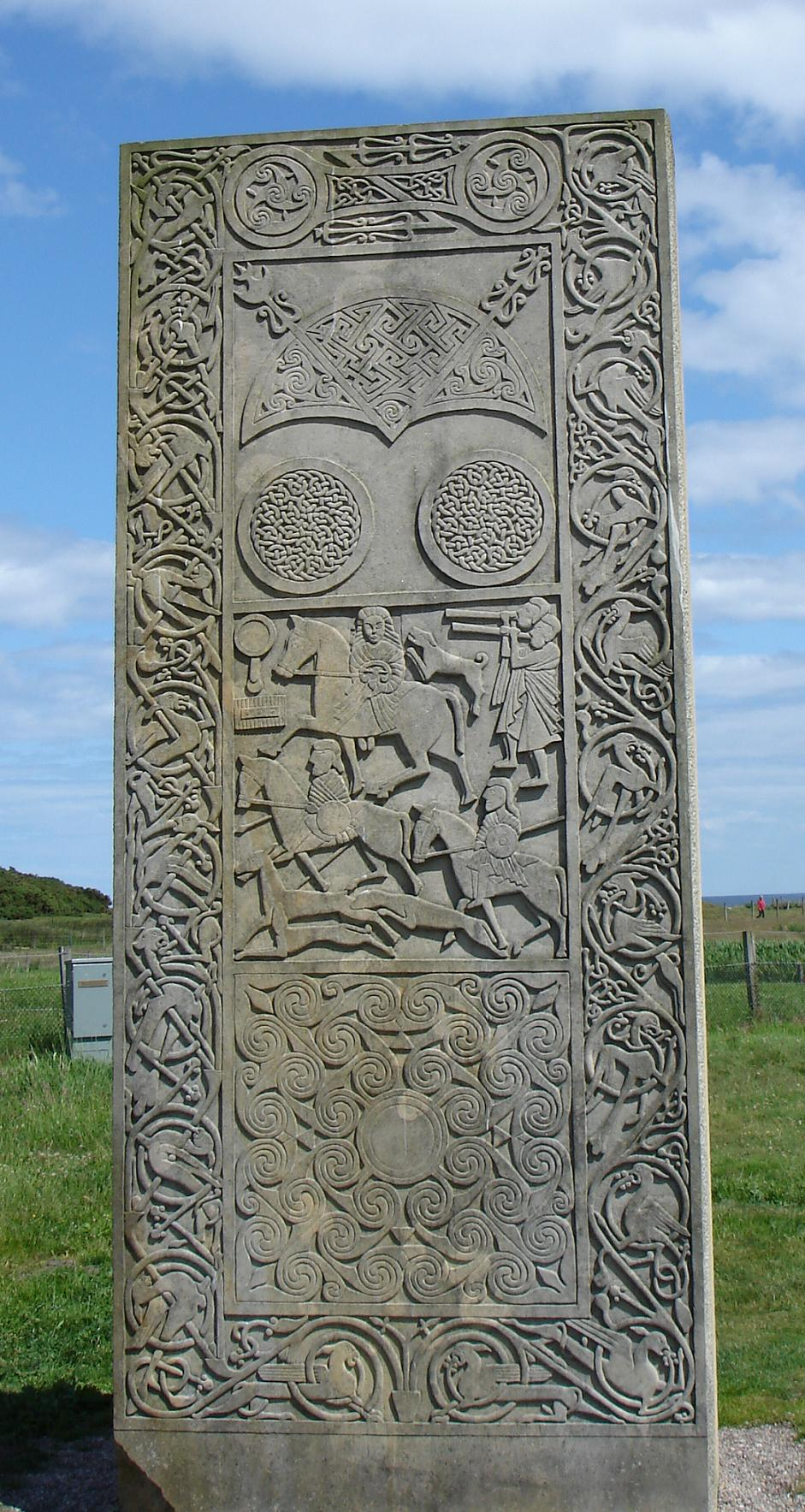
Hilton of Cadboll Stone (replica); Class II

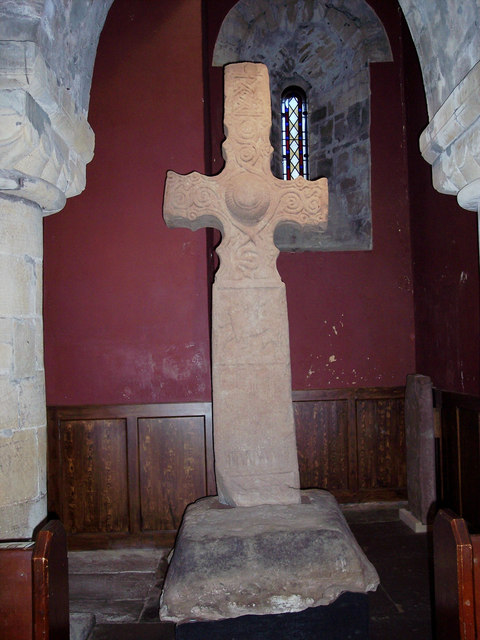
Dupplin Cross, Class III

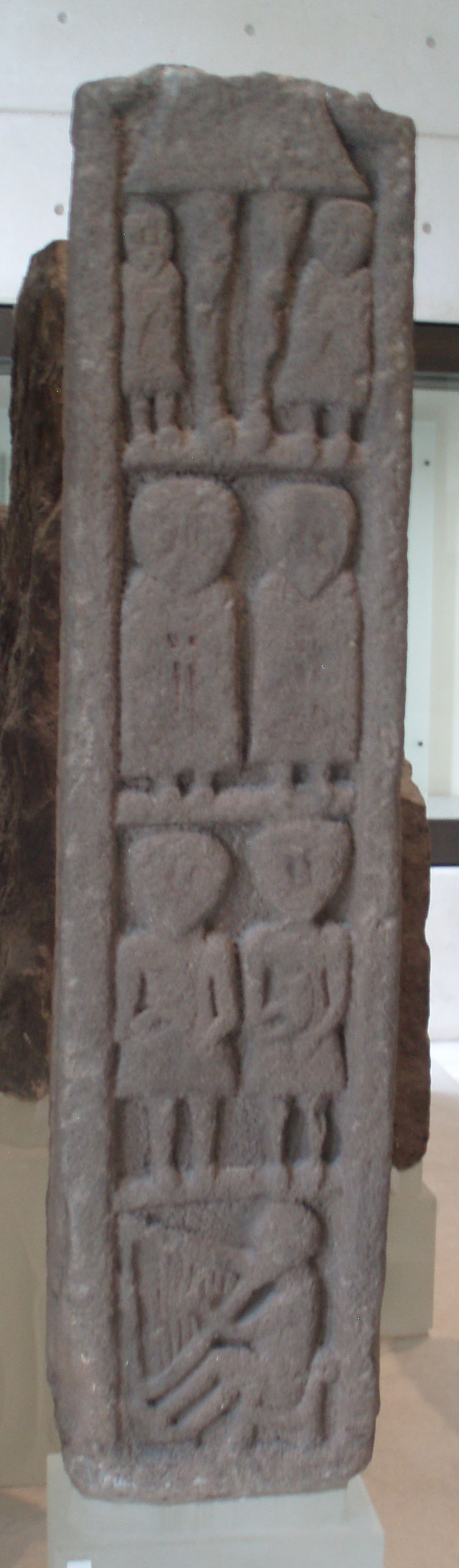
Monifieth 4; Class III

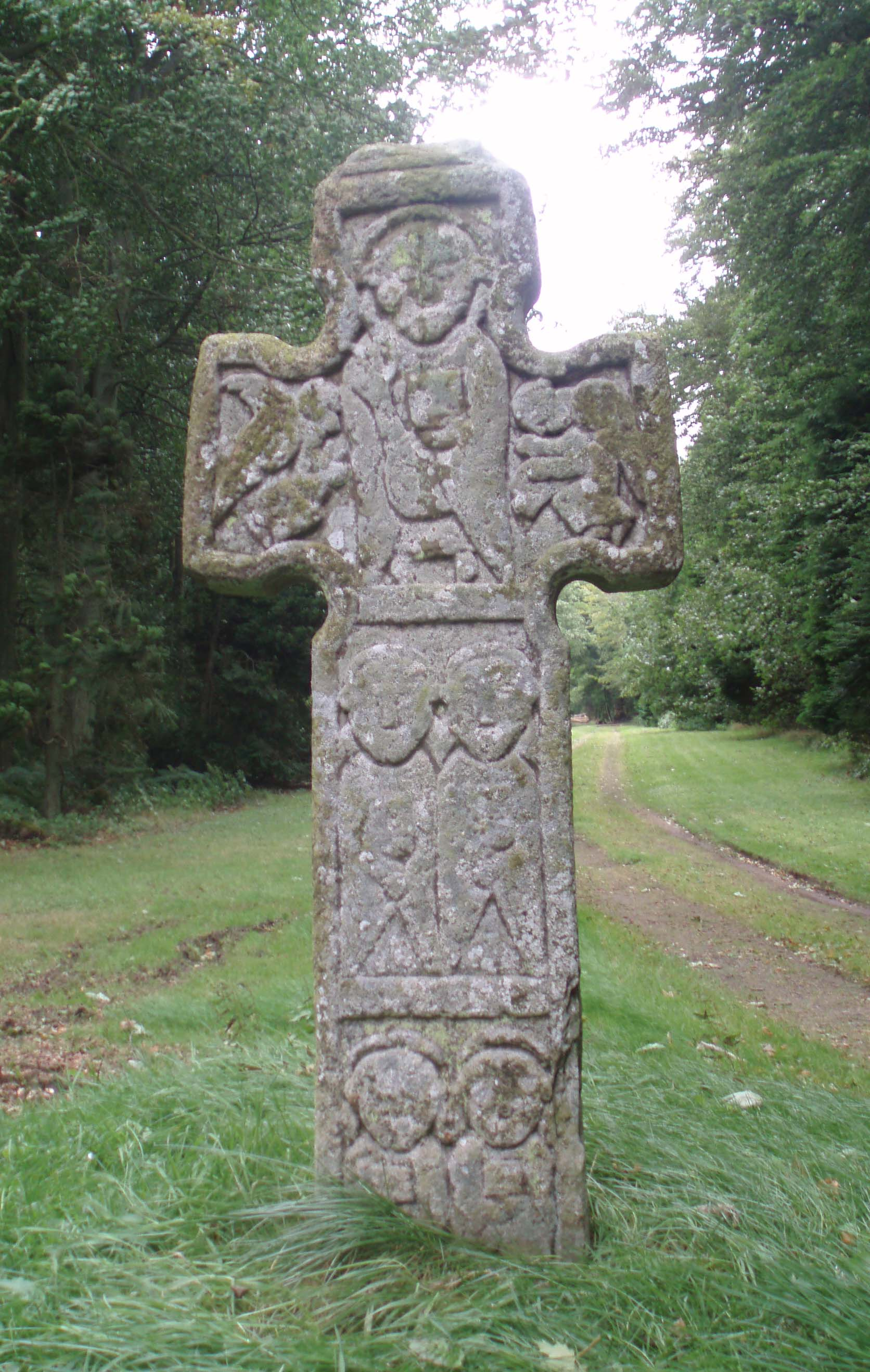
Camus Cross; Class III

== See also ==
- Painted pebbles
- Carved stone balls
- Petrosphere
- High cross
- Cross stones

== Sources ==
- Henderson, George; Henderson, Isabel. The Art of the Picts: Sculpture and Metalwork in Early Medieval Scotland. Thames and Hudson, 2004. ISBN 978-0-5002-8963-1
