= Kirriemuir sculptured stones =

Pictish stones discovered in Scotland

Coordinates: 56.6441°N 2.8891°W

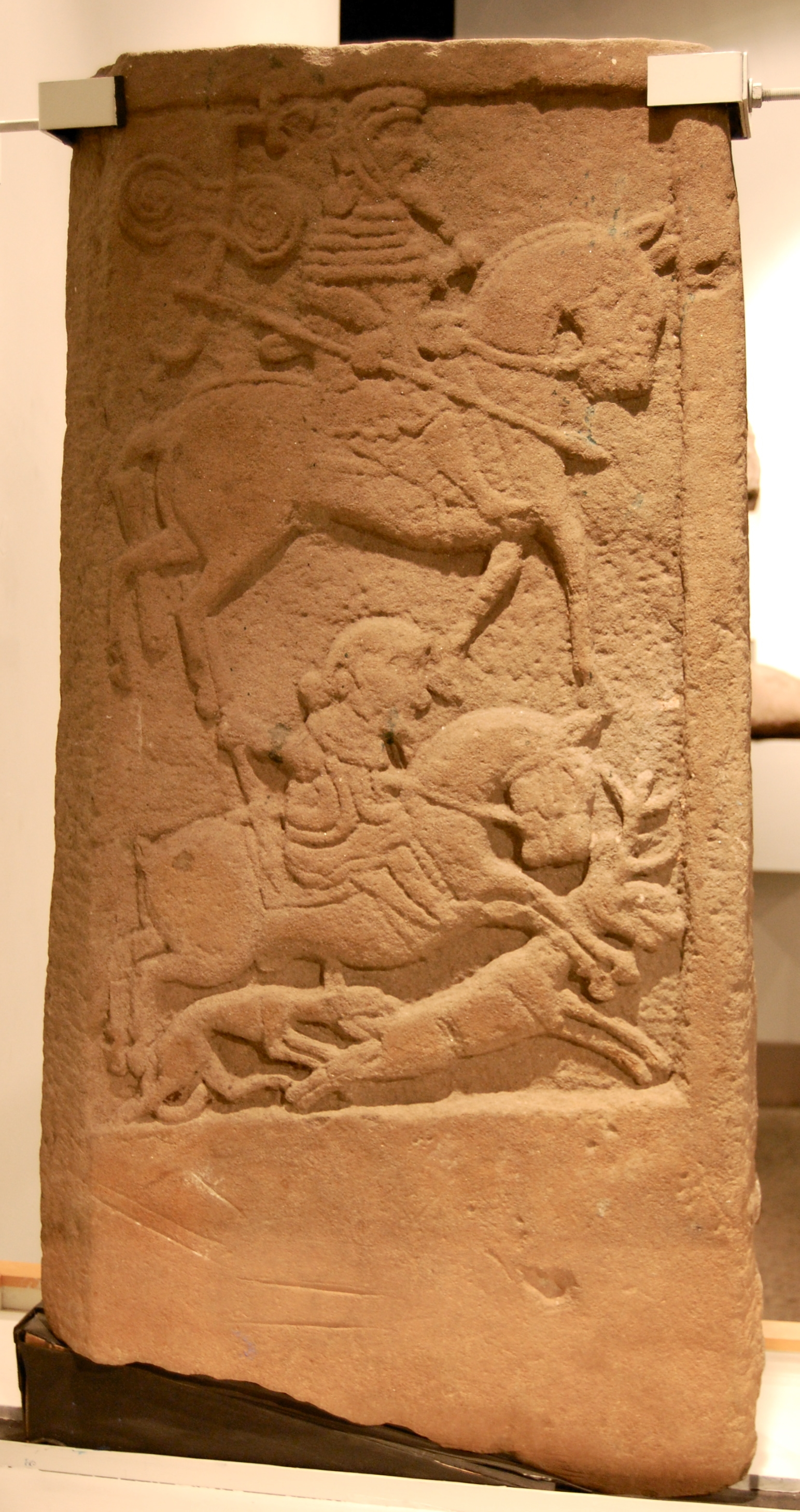
Kirriemuir 2 rear. Photograph by Kyle Munro

The Kirriemuir Sculptured Stones are a series of Class II and III Pictish stones found in Kirriemuir, Angus, Scotland. Their existence points to Kirriemuir being an important ecclesiastical centre in the late first millennium AD.

== Location ==
The stones were found in the grounds of Kirriemuir Kirk grid reference NO38955448. The stones are now on display at the Meffan Institute in Forfar, Angus.

== Description ==
=== Kirriemuir 1 ===
The slab is carved on both faces in relief and, as it bears Pictish symbols, it falls into John Romilly Allen and Joseph Anderson's classification system as a class II stone. The stone bears a number of figural representations and a mirror and comb symbol. The figures have been identified as Saints Anthony and Paul.

The stone is one of the latest to include pictish symbols and can be dated with confidence to the late 9th/early 10th century.

=== Kirriemuir 2 ===
Cross slab carved on both faces in relief. It too contains Pictish symbols and falls into John Romilly Allen and Joseph Anderson's classification system as a class II stone.

== Gallery ==
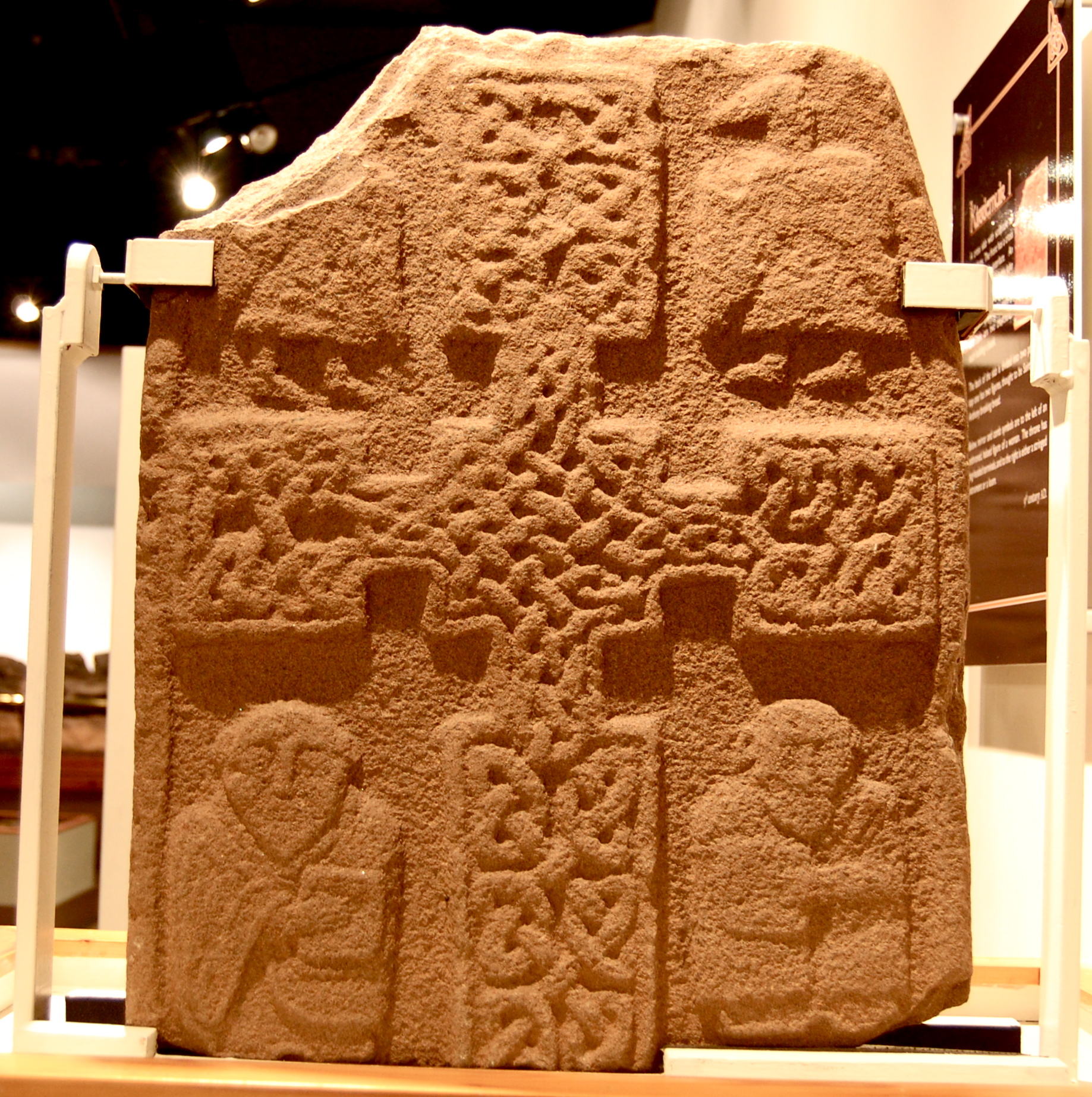
Kirriemuir 1 front. Photograph by Kyle Munro.

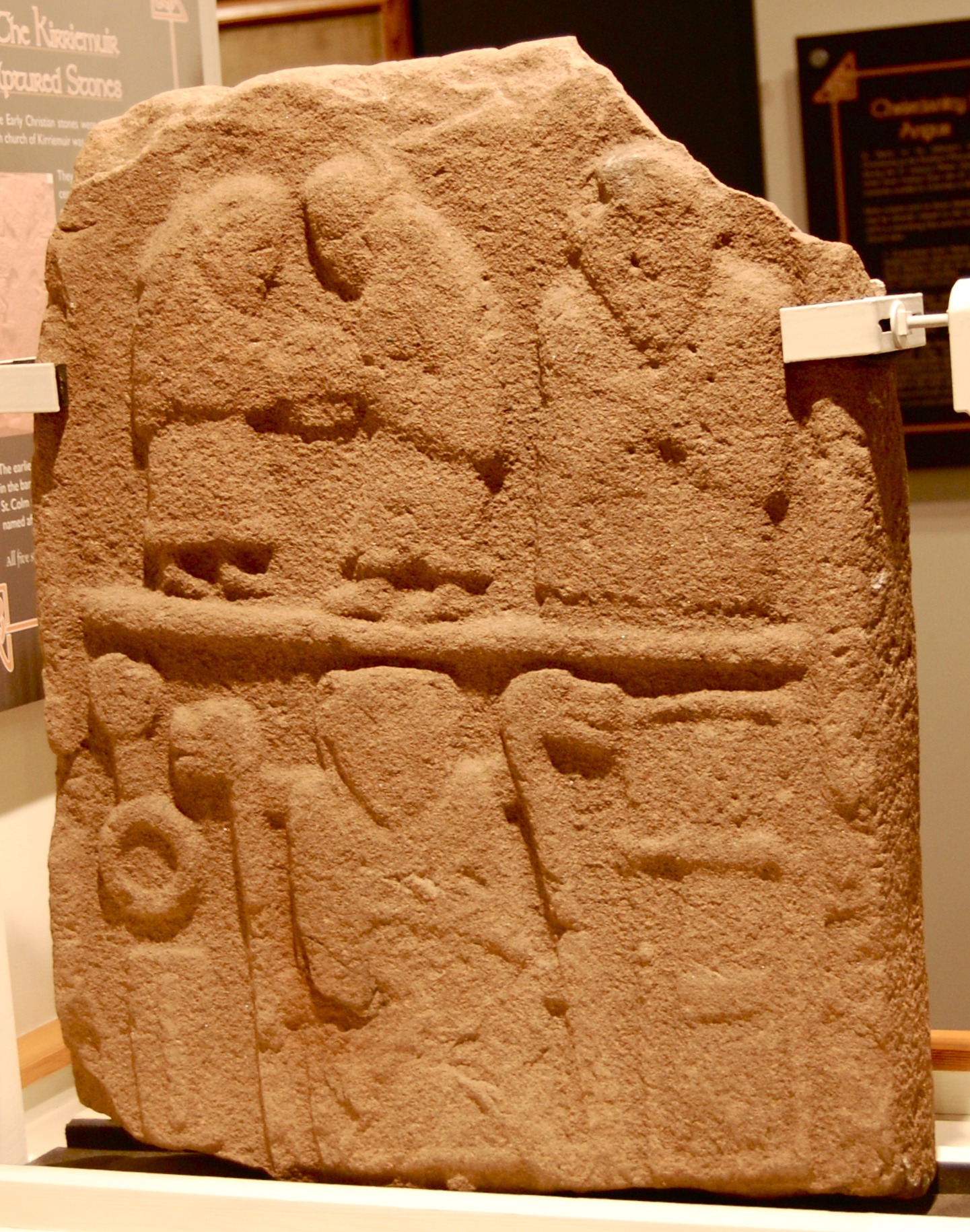
Kirriemuir 1 rear. Photograph by Kyle Munro.

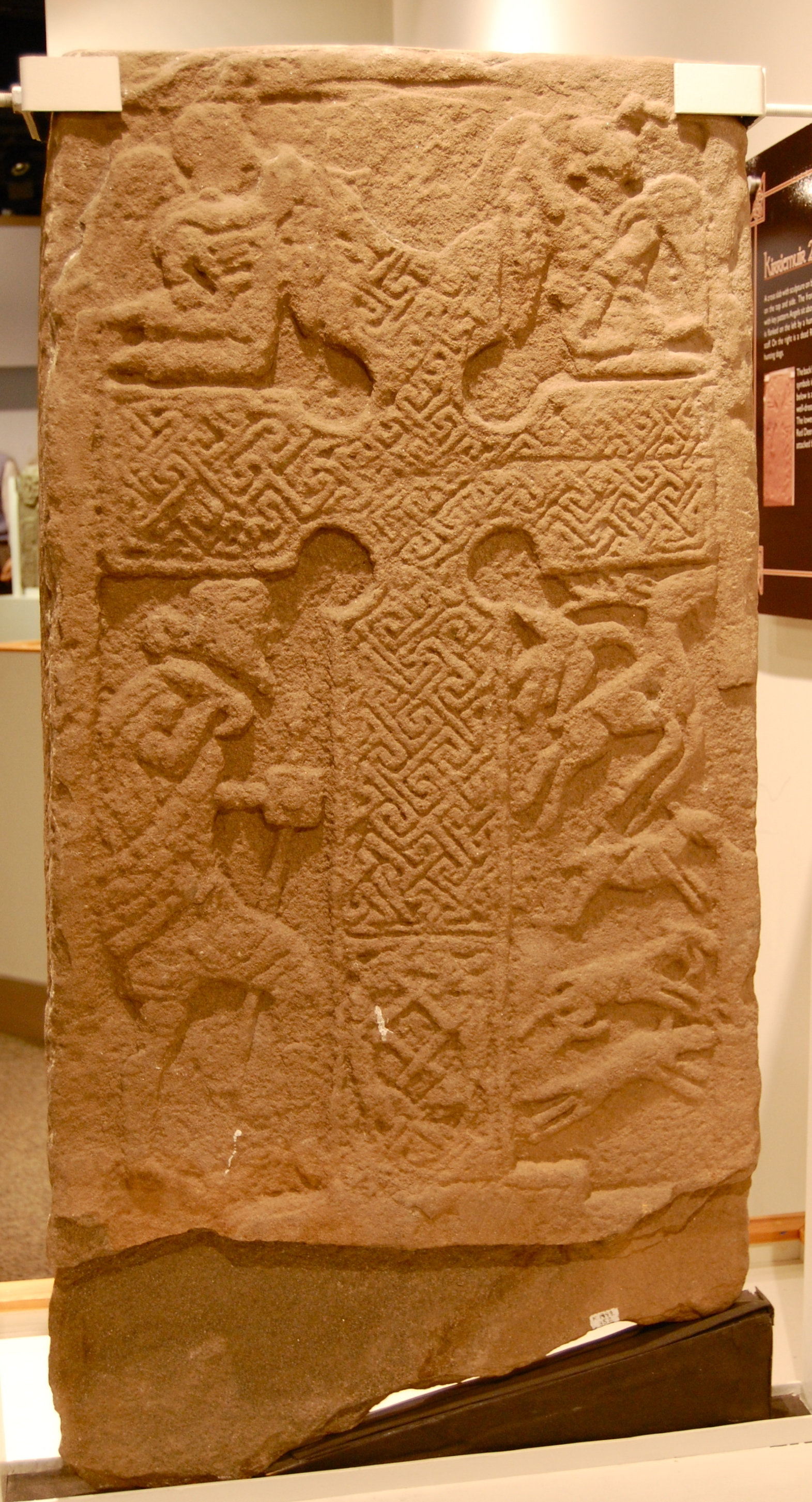
Kirriemuir 2 front. Photograph by Kyle Munro.

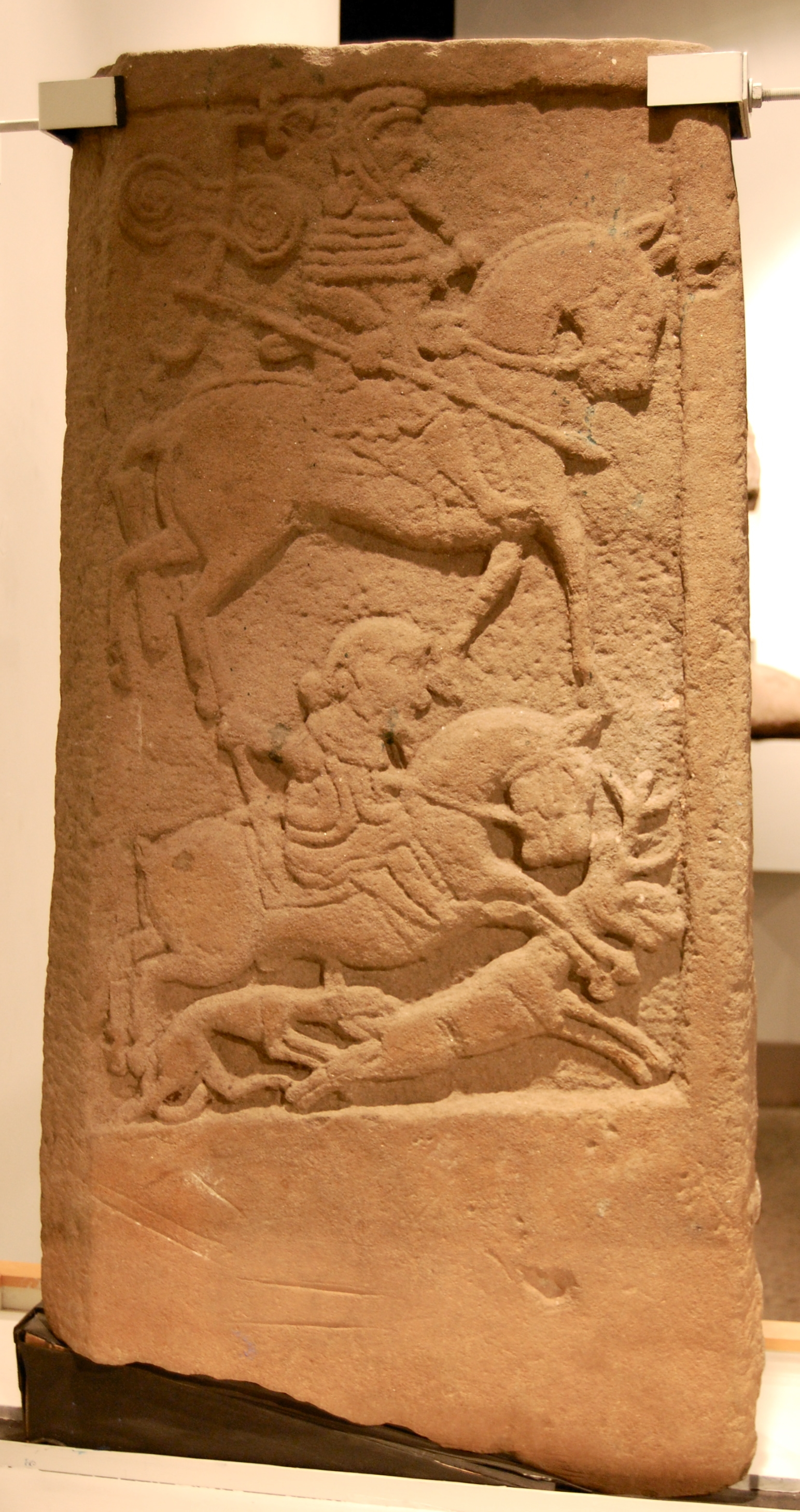
Kirriemuir 2 rear. Photograph by Kyle Munro.

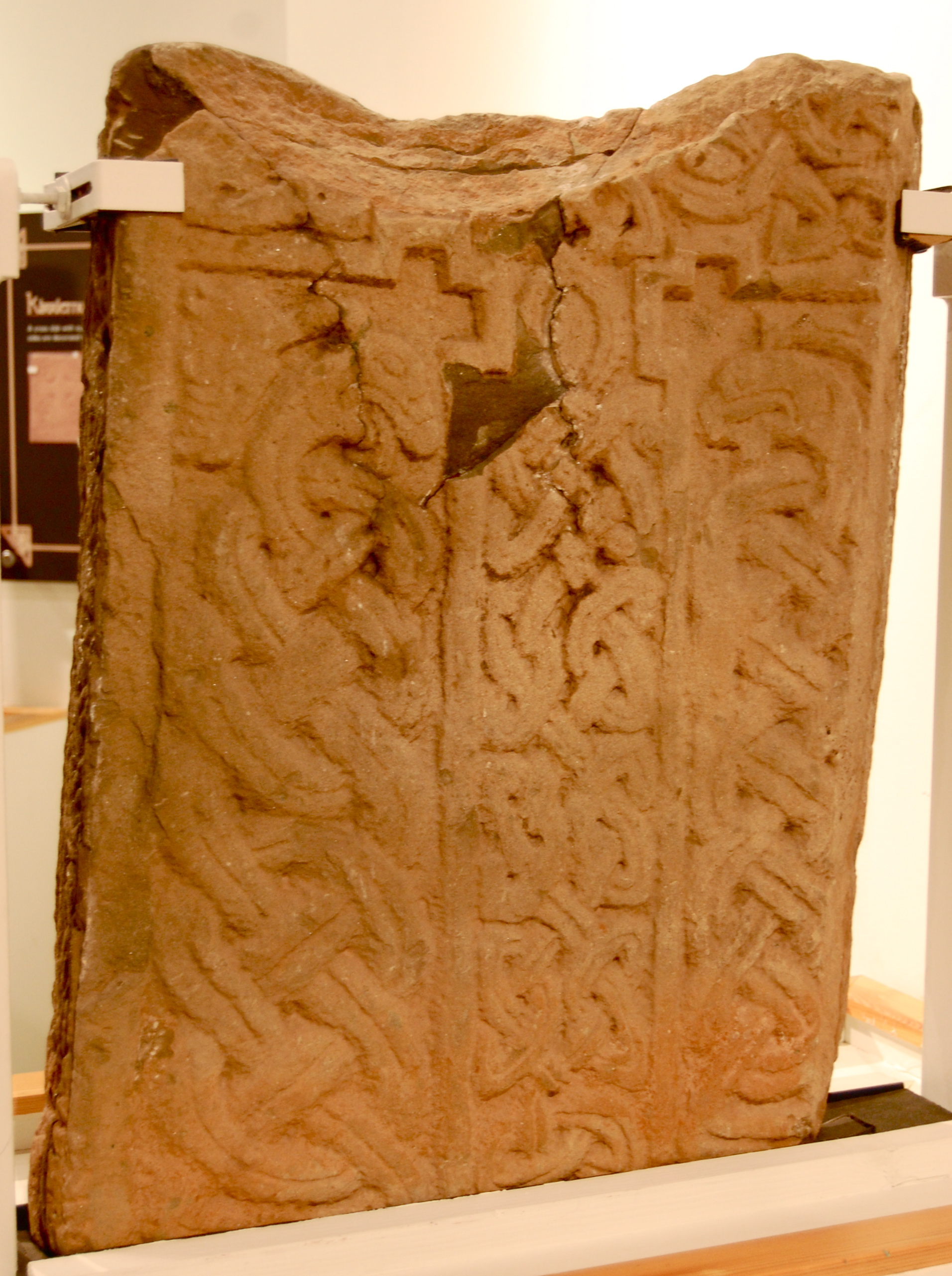
Kirriemuir 3 front. Photograph by Kyle Munro.

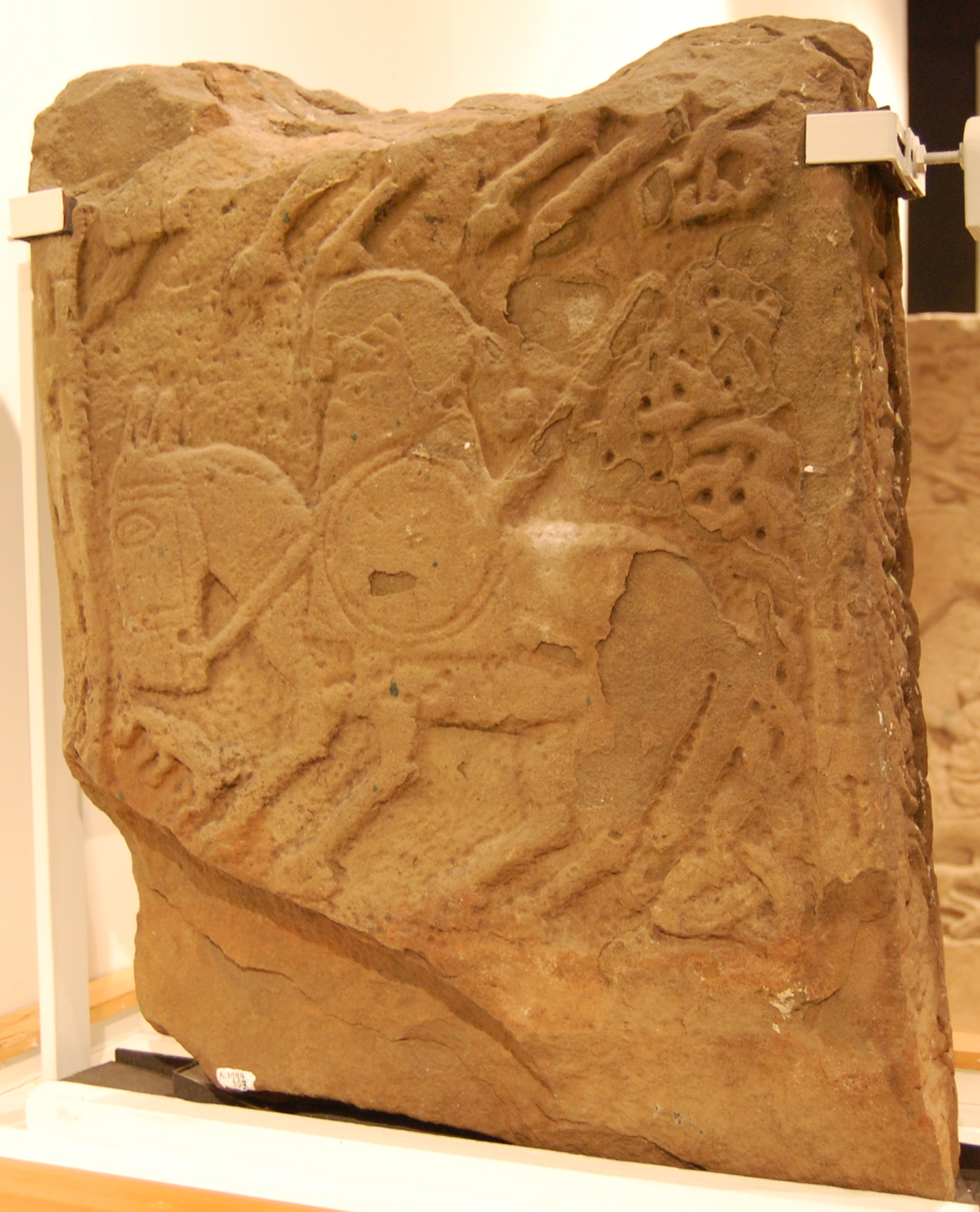
Kirriemuir 3 rear. Photograph by Kyle Munro.
