= Mirror and comb (Pictish symbol) =

The mirror and comb are Pictish symbols of uncertain function, found on Class I and Class II Pictish stones. The mirror, or mirror and comb, do not belong to the body of main Pictish symbols, but are used as modifiers of a symbol pair. The mirror can occur on its own, or with the comb, although the comb never occurs on its own. The mirror, or mirror and comb, occur either below the symbol pair, or beside the lower symbol.

The mirror and comb have been found carved into slabs near the burial of men and at least one woman. Joanna Close-Brookes, writing in 1981, suggested that the presence of the mirror and comb on a burial stone indicated societal rank, discounting earlier hypotheses that it indicated wealth.

== Gallery ==
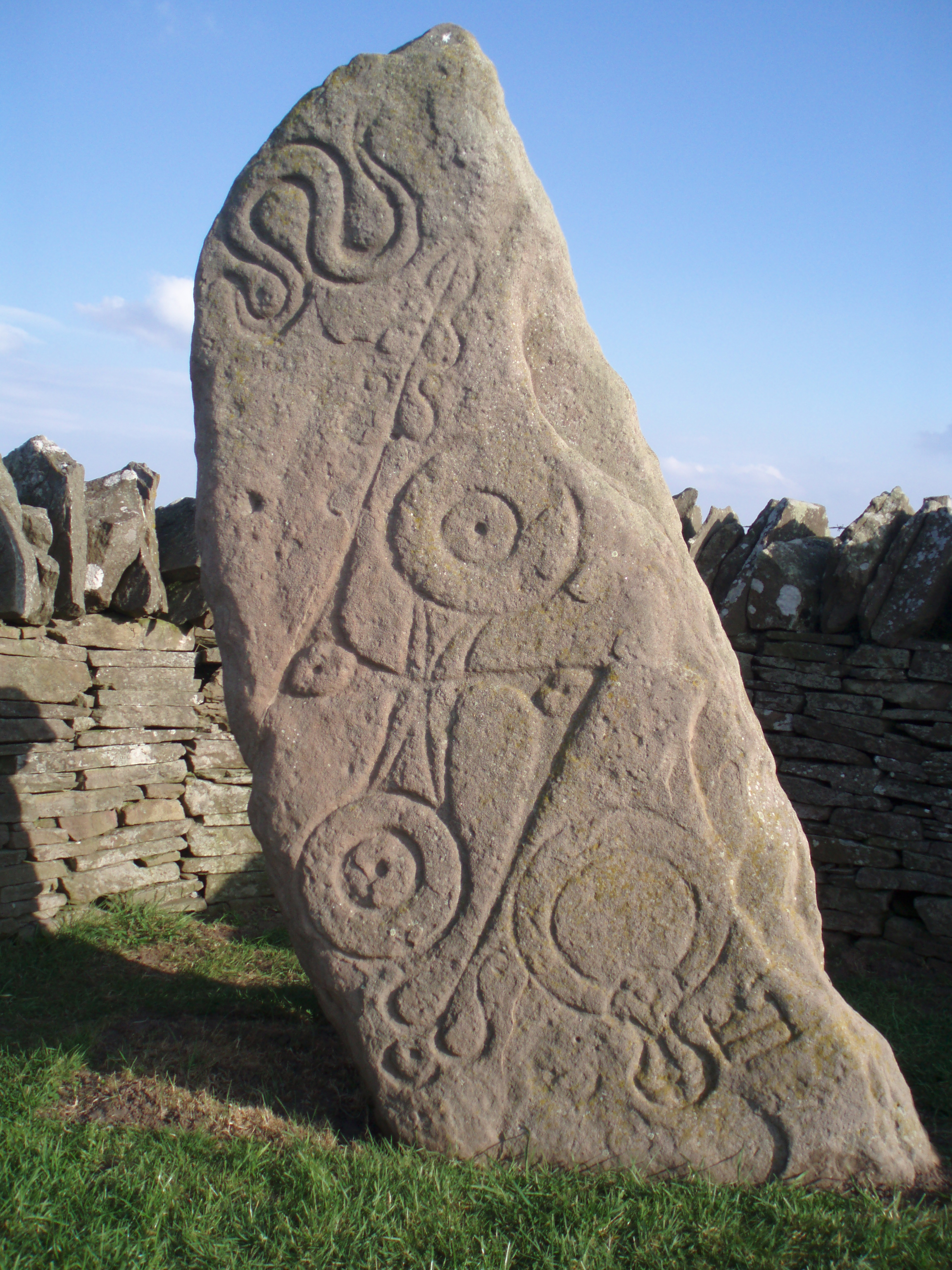
Aberlemno 1

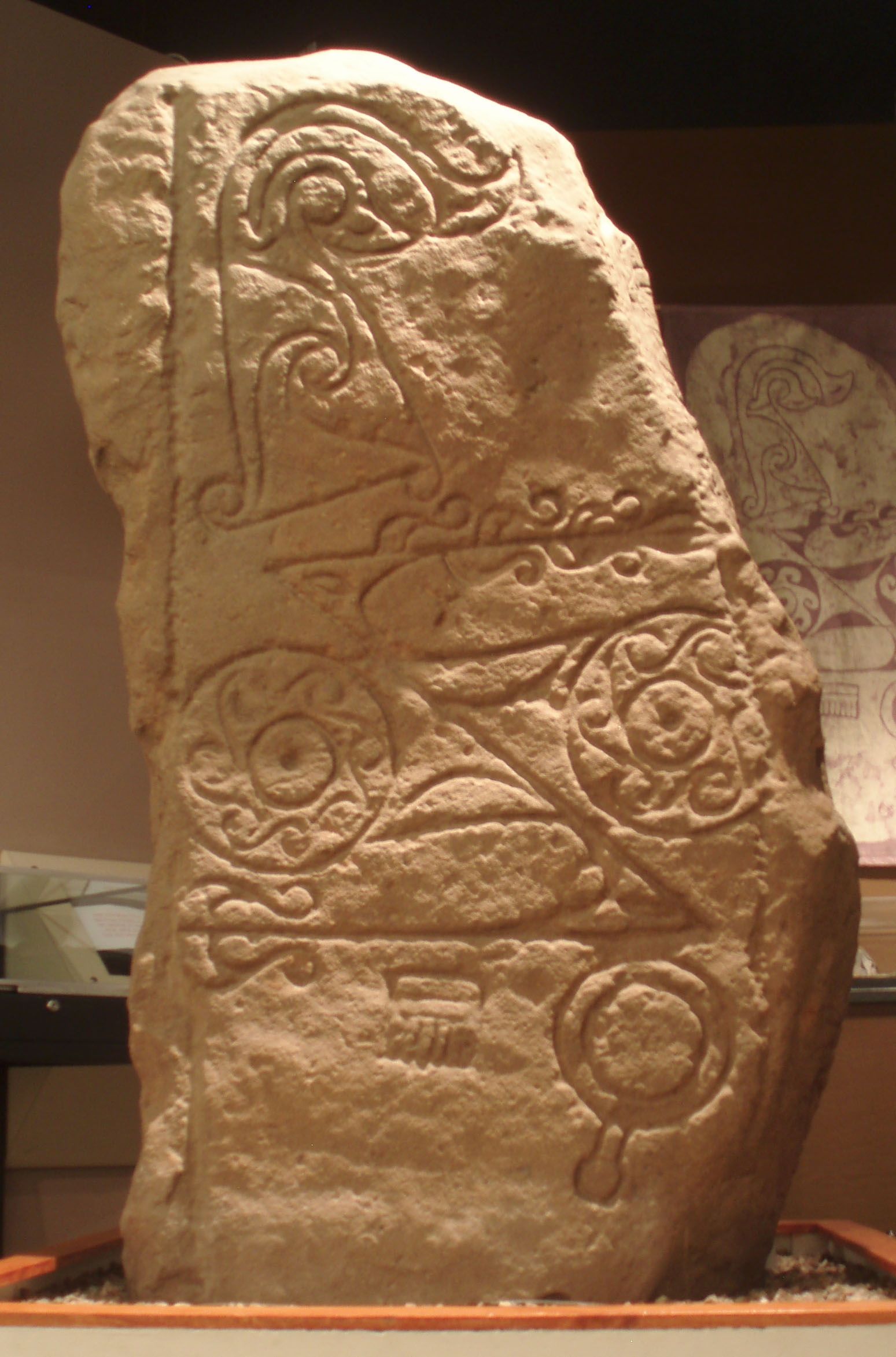
Dunnichen Stone

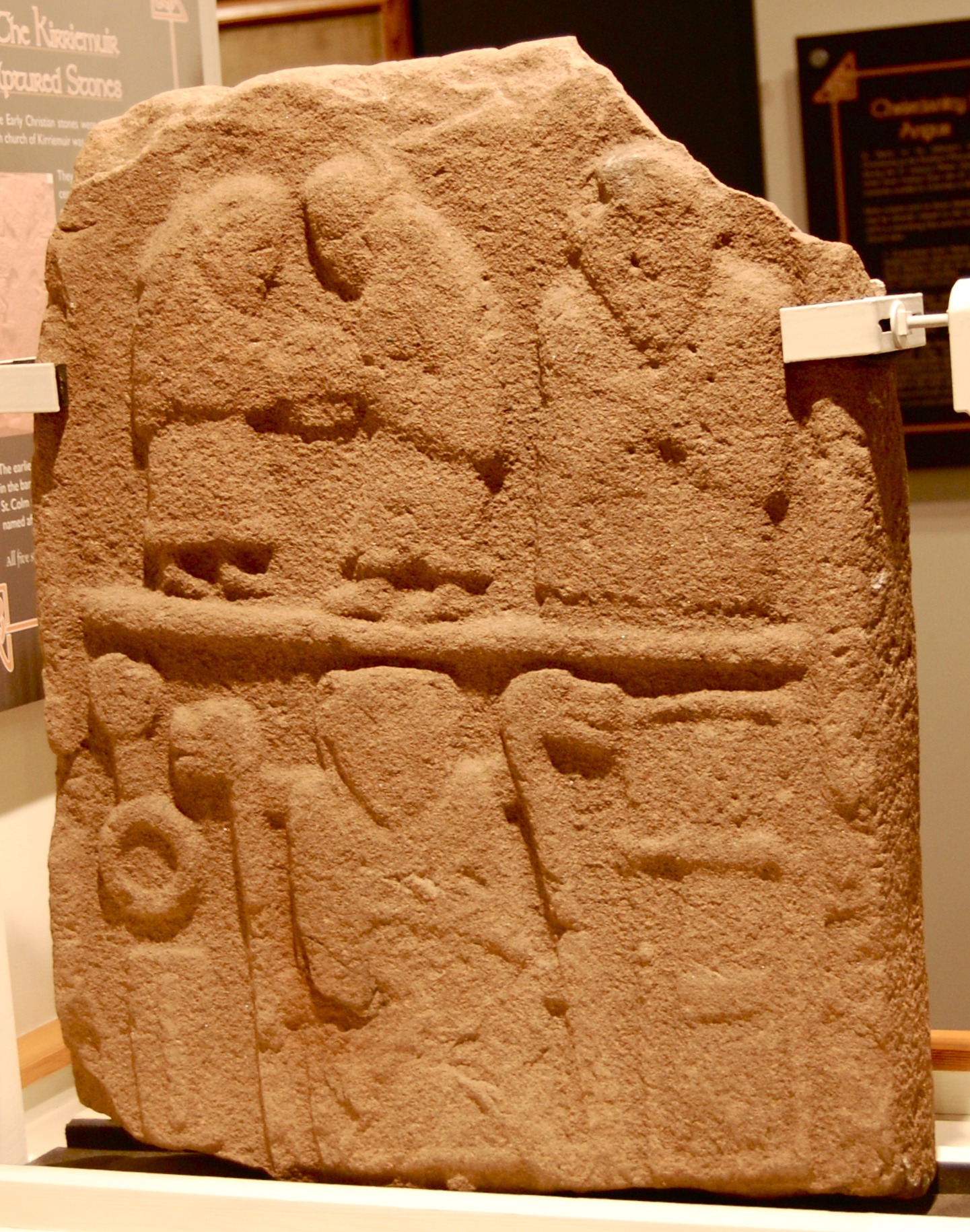
Kirriemuir 1
