= John Stephenson (judge) =

English barrister and judge

- Born: 28 March 1910
- Died: 1 November 1998 (aged 88)
- Education: New College Oxford
- Spouse: Rose Asquith (m. 1951)
- Children: 4
- Father: Guy Stephenson
- Relatives: Augustus Keppel Stephenson (grandfather); John Gilbert Talbot (grandfather)
- Military career
- Service: Royal Engineers
- Rank: Lieutenant-Colonel

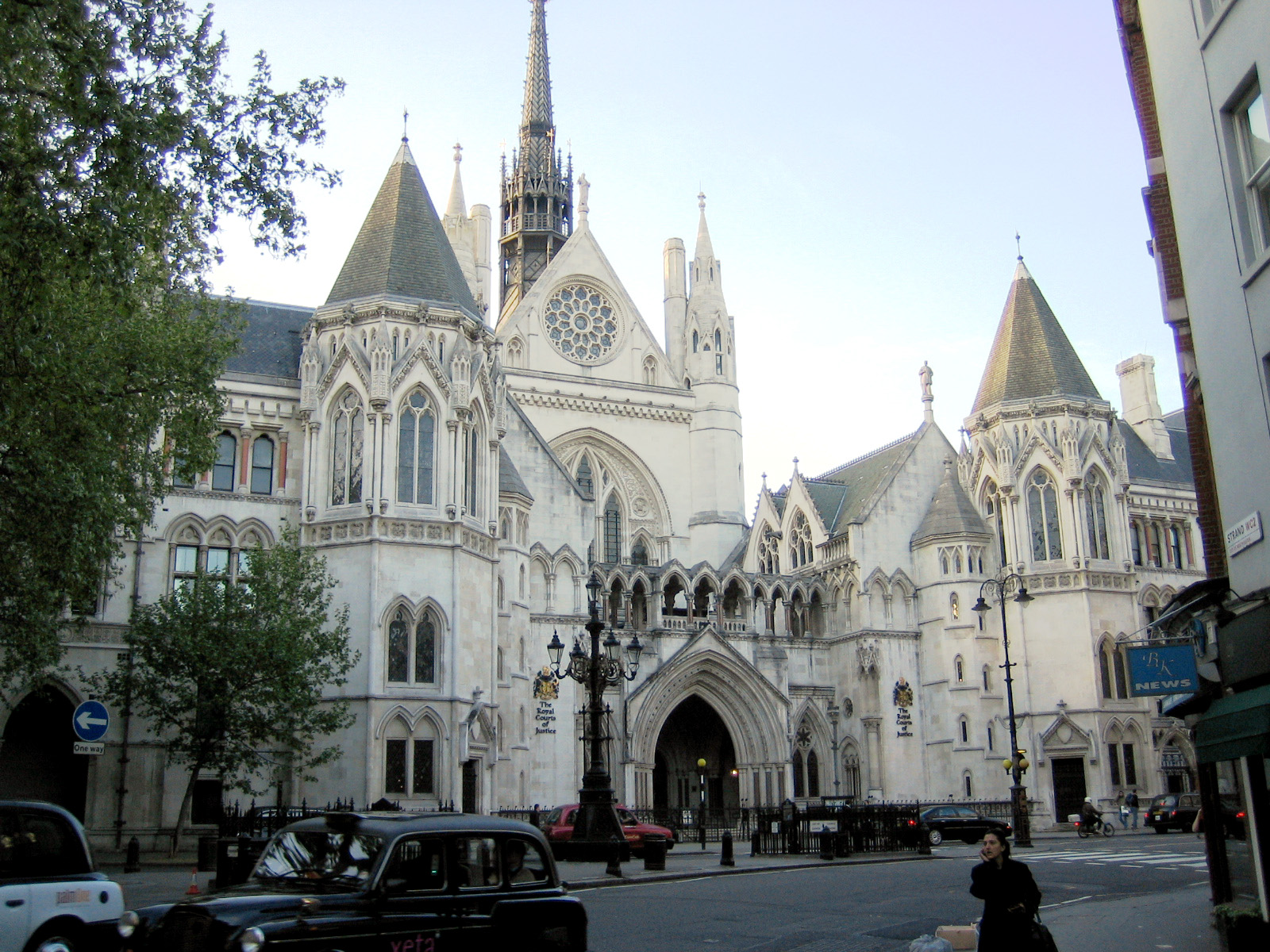
The Royal Courts of Justice, seat of the Court of Appeal

Sir John Frederick Eustace Stephenson (28 March 1910 – 1 November 1998) was an English barrister and judge, a Lord Justice of Appeal from 1971 until his retirement in 1985 and a member of the Privy Council. As a judge of the Court of Appeal he was known as Lord Justice Stephenson.

== Early life ==
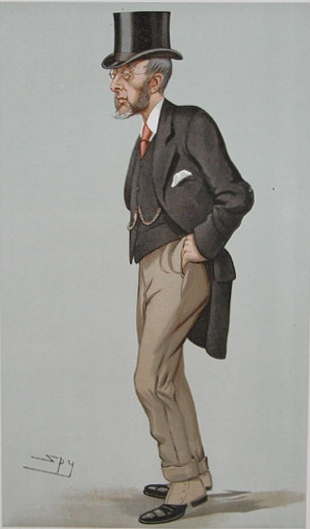
Stephenson's grandfather J. G. Talbot by "Spy" in Vanity Fair, July 1897

The second son of Sir Guy Stephenson CB, by his marriage to Gwendolen Talbot, a daughter of John Gilbert Talbot PC MP, Stephenson was a grandson of Sir Augustus Frederick William Keppel Stephenson (1827–1904) a Treasury Solicitor and Director of Public Prosecutions. He had two sisters, Margaret Eglantine (born 1907) and Jane (1914) and three brothers, Augustus (1909), Paul (1913) and H. J. Stephenson (1921–1943).

He was educated at West Downs, Winchester College and New College, Oxford, holding scholarships at both. He took a first in Honours Moderations in 1930 and another in Literae Humaniores in 1932, graduating BA in 1932. His father died in 1930 while he was still an undergraduate at Oxford.

== Career ==
Stephenson was called to the Bar from the Inner Temple in 1934. In 1938 he joined the Royal Engineers (Territorial Army) as a sapper. In 1940 he was attached to the War Office and was commissioned into the Intelligence Corps, in which he was a captain in 1943, promoted Major in 1944 and Lieutenant-Colonel in 1946, serving in the Middle East and North West Europe. In 1946 he was appointed as Regional Intelligence Officer in Hamburg.

Following his return to civilian life, Stephenson was Recorder of Bridgwater from 1954 to 1959, then of Winchester, from 1959 to 1962. He was Chancellor of the Diocese of Peterborough from 1956 to 1962, then of Winchester from 1958 to 1962. He was appointed Queen's Counsel in 1960, served as a Judge of the Queen's Bench Division of the High Court of Justice from 1962 to 1971 and simultaneously as Deputy Chairman of the Dorset Quarter Sessions. On 20 April 1971, together with Alan Stewart Orr, Stephenson was appointed a Lord Justice of Appeal. On the same day, Sir John Passmore Widgery was created Lord Widgery and became Lord Chief Justice. Stephenson served in the Court of Appeal for fourteen years before retiring in 1985.

=== Notable cases ===
In the case of R v Collins (1972) in the Court of Appeal of England and Wales, Stephenson and Lord Justice Edmund-Davies considered the meaning of "enters as a trespasser" in the definition of burglary. The appellant, Collins, was a nineteen-year-old who had been convicted at the Essex Assizes of burglary with intent to commit rape and had been sentenced to twenty-one months' imprisonment. After an evening's drinking he had climbed a ladder wearing nothing but his socks and was about to enter a young woman's bedroom when she woke, saw him in the moonlight on her window-sill with an erect penis, thought he was her boyfriend coming to pay her a romantic call, and invited him in. After sexual intercourse, she realised that Collins was not her boyfriend and cried rape. In the Appeal Court the sentence was quashed on the grounds that Collins had not "entered as a trespasser".

In 1979 the Church of Scientology of California sued the British Department of Health and Social Security for defamation in the English High Court. The DHSS had suggested that Scientologists were dangerous charlatans who would worsen rather than cure mental illness. The plaintiff demanded discovery of letters and medical records from people who had complained to the DHSS about the Church. Stephenson declined the request, citing the church's "fair game" policy, which he believed was still in force. He feared that the documents would be used "not for legitimate purposes of the action but for harassment of individual patients, informants and renegades named in them, not only by proceedings for defamation against them but by threats and blackmail".

== Private life ==
In 1951, Stephenson married Frances Rose Asquith (1925−2020), the younger daughter of Lord Asquith of Bishopstone, a Law Lord, and they had two sons and two daughters, Mary (1952), David Guy (1954), Laura Jane (1958) and Daniel Paul Stephenson (1960).

At the time of his death in 1998 his address was given in Who's Who as 26 Doneraile Street, London SW6, and he was a member of the Hurlingham Club, the Marylebone Cricket Club, and the Royal Wimbledon Golf Club.

== Publication ==
- A Royal Correspondence: Letters of King Edward VII and King George V to Admiral Sir Henry F. Stephenson, 1938 (ed.)

== Honours ==
- Knighted, 1962
- Member of Her Majesty's Most Honourable Privy Council, 1971
- Honorary Fellow of New College, Oxford, 1979
