= 1885 Dissolution Honours =

British government recognitions

The 1885 Dissolution Honours List was issued in June 1885 prior to the general election of that year.

The recipients of honours are displayed as they were styled before their new honour.

== Marquess ==
- Gavin Campbell, Earl of Breadalbane, by the names, styles, and titles of Marquess of Breadalbane, of Kenmure in the County of Perth

== Earl and Viscount ==
- The Right Honourable Sir Stafford Henry Northcote Bt GCB by the names, styles, and titles of Viscount Saint Cyres, of Newton Saint Cyres, in the county of Devon, and Earl of Iddesleigh, in the said county

== Earl ==
- Alexander Duff, Earl of Fife (previously an Earl in the Peerage of Scotland)

== Baron ==
- Mervyn Edward, Viscount Powerscourt KP in that part of the United Kingdom called Ireland, by the name, style, and title of Baron Powerscourt, of Powerscourt, in the county of Wicklow
- Anthony Henley, Baron Henley, in that part of the United Kingdom called Ireland, by the name, style, and title of Baron Northington, of Watford, in the county of Northampton
- Sir Nathaniel Mayer Rothschild Bt by the name, style, and title of Baron Rothschild, of Tring, in the county of Hertford
- Edward Charles Baring, by the name, style, and title of Baron Revelstoke, of Membland, in the county of Devon
- The Right Honourable Sir Robert Porrett Collier Kt a Member of the Judicial Committee of the Privy Council, by the name, style, and title of Baron Monkswell, of Monkswell, in the county of Devon
- The Right Honourable Sir Arthur Hobhouse KCSI CIE a Member of the Judicial Committee of the Privy Council, by the name, style, and title of Baron Hobhouse, of Hadspen, in the county of Somerset
- Sir Ralph Robert Wheeler Lingen KCB by the name, style, and title of Baron Lingen, of Lingen, in the county of Hereford
- The Right Honourable Edward Gibson, Chancellor of that part of the United Kingdom called Ireland, by the name, style, and title of Baron Ashbourne, of Ashbourne, in the county of Meath
- Rowland Winn, by the name, style, and title of Baron Saint Oswald, of Nostell, in the West Riding of the county of York

== Baronets ==
- John Millais RA
- Charles Tennant MP
- George Frederic Watts RA (declined honour)

== Knight Bachelor ==
- Henry Edwards MP

== The Most Noble Order of the Garter ==
=== Knight of the Most Noble Order of the Garter (KG) ===
- William Compton, Marquess of Northampton
- William Molyneux, Earl of Sefton

== The Most Honourable Order of the Bath ==
=== Knight Commander of the Order of the Bath (KCB) ===
Civil Division

- Augustus Keppel Stephenson CB Solicitor to the Treasury
