= Robert Coombes =

Robert Coombes or Coombs may refer to:

- Robert Coombes (rower) (1808–1860), British sculler
- Robert Coombes (murderer) (1882–1949), British minor convicted of murdering his mother
- Rob Coombes (born 1972), English musician
- Robert Coombs (politician) (born 1959), member of the New South Wales Legislative Assembly
- Robert Coombs (cricketer) (born 1959), English cricketer
- Robin Coombs (Robert Royston Amos Coombs, 1921–2006), British immunologist

== See also ==
- Robert Coombe, chemist and educator
