= Guy Stephenson =

British barrister and civil servant

Guy Stephenson CB

Assistant Treasury Solicitor
- In office 1905-?

Personal details
- Born: 5 November 1865 London, England
- Died: 17 October 1930 (aged 64)
- Spouse: Gwendolen Talbot (m. 1905)
- Children: 5, including John
- Parent: Augustus Keppel Stephenson (father)
- Relatives: Henry Stephenson (grandfather); Edward Pleydell-Bouverie (grandfather)
- Education: Trinity College, Cambridge

Sir Guy Stephenson CB (5 November 1865 – 17 October 1930) was a British barrister, Assistant Treasury Solicitor and Assistant Director of Public Prosecutions.

== Biography ==
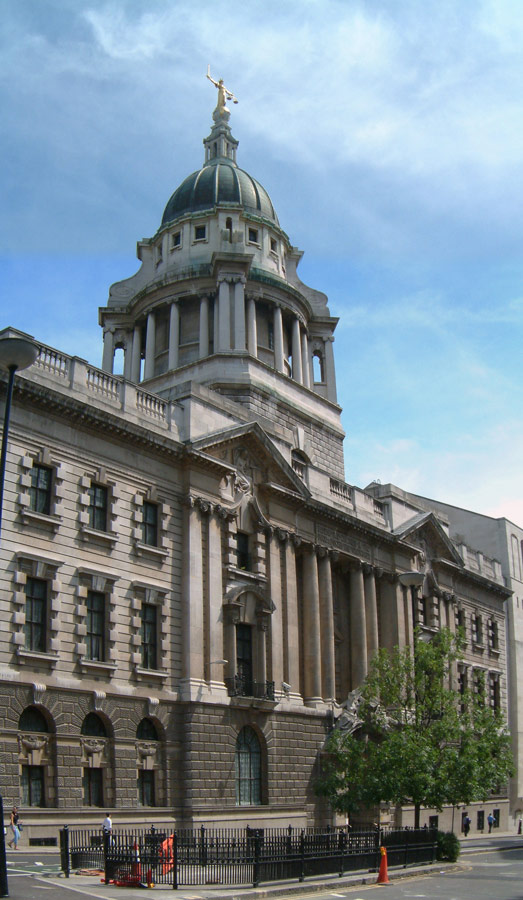
The Central Criminal Court, or Old Bailey, where Stephenson practised

Stephenson was born in St George Hanover Square in London, the eldest son of Sir Augustus Keppel Stephenson (1827–1904) and his wife, Eglantine Pleydell-Bouverie, daughter of Edward Pleydell-Bouverie. He was educated at Harrow and Trinity College, Cambridge. He was called to the Bar from the Inner Temple in 1888 and practised as a barrister at the Central Criminal Court and on the South Eastern Circuit. In 1901, he was appointed as counsel to the Treasury at the North London Sessions and in 1905 as Assistant Treasury Solicitor. In 1895, along with Horace Avory, he was the prosecutor in the Robert Coombes murder case.

From 1908 until his death, he served as assistant director of Public Prosecutions. He also was a captain and later an Honorary Major in the 2nd Volunteer Battalion the Wiltshire Regiment.

== Private life ==
In 1905, Stephenson married Gwendolen, a daughter of J. G. Talbot. They had four sons (including John Stephenson, a future Lord Justice of Appeal) and one daughter.

In Who's Who, he gave his recreations as shooting, fishing, and golf and his club as Brooks's. His address at the time of his death was 41 Egerton Gardens, London SW3.

== Honours ==
- Companion of the Order of the Bath, 1915
- Knight Bachelor, 1923

== Publication ==
- Archbold's Criminal Pleading (joint editor of 22nd and 23rd editions)
