= James Canham Read =

British bigamist and murderer

James Canham Read (1855–1894) was a British bigamist and murderer known as the Southend Murderer or Prittlewell Murderer. The entire affair and aftermath is sometimes called the Southend Mystery. Friends (and lovers) called him Jimmy Read, however, he used multiple names to disguise his several relationships, and fabricated other false characters to help excuse his absences to his various partners. Given the timing of events and the publicity involved, the events may have partially influenced Oscar Wilde's "The Importance of Being Earnest" which was released the following year.

== Life ==
He was born in Kentish Town in north London the son of John Canham Read and his wife Eliza Fanny Gosbee from Dublin. In his childhood he was a choirboy at St Mary's Chapel of Ease in Shadwell but became an agnostic. Read worked as the cashier at the Royal Albert Dock, London and lived at 57 Jamaica Street in Stepney. He earned £140 per annum, which at that time was well above average. He was (legally) married to Emma Sarah Payne with eight children. However he had several mistresses.

Mrs Bertha Ayris or Ayriss (née Dennis) was married and lived with her husband John Ayris and four children at 24 Wesley Road in Southend-on-Sea. Read had met Bertha on the Southend Pier. Ironically both were using false names and he knew her as Mrs Neville. One of her children (born May 1892) was said by her to be by Read but their affair had ended. Her unmarried sister Florence Dennis lived with them. Read had met Florence whilst with Bertha at Clapham Common (explaining himself as a friend) in September 1890 when she was only 18. His affair with Bertha possibly ended due to Florence. He corresponded with Florence using a go-between, her younger sister Evelina Dennis (14 years old). Her correspondence was addressed to "Mr Talbott". Florence became pregnant by Read around October 1893 but his preference was for yet another woman: Beatrice Kempton who he was also "married" to, with a six month old child. He had met Beatrice working in a sweet shop at Gloucester Road and she knew him as "Edgar Benson" and believed him to be a commercial traveller which required long absences.

Read took a revolver from the possession of his brother Harold Victor Read ("Harry"), who lived at 16 North Road, Poplar, supposedly to keep Harry out of trouble in 1892. Harry was an "aesthete" and dressed in bright clothes, greatly influenced by Oscar Wilde. Harry had met Miss Kempton and knew of the illicit second marriage. He too was part of the deceit, and Beatrice knew Harry as "Mr Edwards", a friend of her husband. They jointly claimed a fictitious sister in Canterbury married to an equally fictitious Walter Parker. The purpose of this was to create a Bunbury-type character who needed help from time to time and created an excuse for absence. The revolver materialised in the Jamaica Street house in April 1894. Read had a holster made for it.

By this time, from October 1893 onwards, Read had a weekly pattern of spending Monday to Friday with his true wife Emma, and Saturday and Sunday with Beatrice. Neither queried this, but Florence's pregnancy could destroy this happy arrangement, as could Bertha's knowledge of any part of the tangled web. Florence told him of the pregnancy in April 1894.

On the weekend of 23/24 June, Read had told Beatrice that he would be absent all weekend as he needed to visit Walter Palmer in Canterbury. Meanwhile, Florence had told her mother Emma Dennis (who she normally lived with) in Sheerness that she was pregnant. Her mother sent her to live with Bertha in Southend on 19 June, presumably to hide the birth from neighbours.

== The murder and trial ==
On Friday 22 June a telegram was sent to Florence asking her to meet in Prittlewell on Sunday. The telegram was sent from Charing Cross Post Office. It is allegedly from James Read but evidence proved it was in the handwriting of Harry Read, who clearly knew the whole plan. Very strangely it was sent to the post office by post, including the fee, such that no-one could be identified as the man who sent the telegram. Read appears to have kept blank telegram forms on his person for such use.

Read and Miss Dennis had a dual meet-up. The telegram requested her presence at the Great Eastern Station in Southend at 9.30pm on the Saturday night. It is unclear what occurred but a second meeting was arranged on the fateful Sunday.

On Sunday 24 June 1894 Read had organised to meet Florence Dennis in Prittlewell, a village one mile north of Southend. He had travelled there by train on the previous day, but probably spent Saturday night at a local hotel. She thought they were going to discuss her pregnancy (around 8 months) and their future. The meeting had been organised by the telegram (which she received on the Saturday). They were seen together just after 10pm by local Robert Dowthwaite. Soon afterwards Read shot and killed her in a field on the edge of the town off Gainsborough Drive (approximately the position of Gainsborough Park). He missed the last train and walked home on the London Road (A13) asking several people en route for directions (including a policeman at Benfleet at 1.15am). First to see him alone was local Robert Golding who had been in a bar and saw Read around 10.30pm. The murder therefore occurred around 10.15pm. No one heard the shot.

At 9.20am he went to the house of Mr Scannell an old colleague at Leytonstone. This was used as his excuse for arriving at his office in the docks at 10am instead of the expected 9am. Read lit a fire and burned some things.

Later that day, as Florence had not returned home, he received a telegram at 3pm in the docks from Mr Ayriss asking "Where is Florrie?". He responded saying he had not seen her for 18 months, which even ignoring the meeting the night before was clearly wrong (given the pregnancy).

Read knew to stay at the docks or go home to Jamaica Street invited arrest. As cashier he took £160 from his employers safe (to which he had the key) and fled to Rose Cottage in Mitcham where he arrived before 9pm. Here he hoped to live under the name Edgar Benson with Beatrice and their young son Albert (Bertie). He told Harry to cover his tracks in the docks. He told Beatrice that "Palmer" had loaned him a large sum.

Florence was found by a youth, Frederick Rush, just after 6pm on Monday 25 June lying in a ditch at the edge of the field, shot through the head. Bertha identified the body and told the police of Read. The police went to his Jamaica Street home and was told by his wife that he had been absent for several days. A wanted poster was released by Southend Police around 26 June.

In Mitcham, Read bought a new suit of clothes on 26 June and disposed of those he had worn on 24th.

On 27 June he left Mitcham, again fearing arrest, and telegrammed Beatrice regularly asking if all was okay (expecting word of police). After an absence of ten days he returned, thinking himself safe.

Southend police (led by Sgt Alfred John Marden and Inspector Baker) had watched the Jamaica Street house and intercepted an outgoing letter from Harry to "Mr Benson, Rose Cottage, Mitcham". Possibly also watching Rose Cottage and not moving until he was seen, the police went to interview "Mr Benson". He denied being Read but matched the description and had a newspaper cutting of the crime in his pocket. "Mrs Benson" showed their wedding certificate but this was clearly forged. Read was arrested by Inspector Baker accompanied by Sergeant Alfred Marden of Southend on 7 July. Harry Read appeared at the garden gate just as James was being led away in handcuffs. An identity parade on 9 July proved they had the right man.

He was imprisoned at Springfield Jail in Chelmsford on 30 July 1894. Read plead guilty on the charge of theft from his employer.

The murder trial began on 12 November at Essex Assizes in the Shire Hall and was judged by Charles Edward Pollock. The prosecution was led by Frank Lockwood (later famed for prosecuting Oscar Wilde) assisted by Guy Stephenson, and Read was defended by Alfred Cock QC and Mr Warburton. Read entered a plea of "not guilty". The evidence was largely circumstantial but was substantive. Witnesses were inconsistent in their identification of Read and no murder weapon was presented. There was little public sympathy for Read who was seen as a total scoundrel.

Curiously the future murderer Robert Coombes attended the trial. Robert's father worked at the dock and young Robert had tried several financial con tricks which may have also included Read, or he may have simply known him in passing due to frequent visits to the docks.

On the third day of the trial, whether Read was guilty or not, his character was well-damned, with handwriting experts asserting several telegrams written by Harry in James' name, and Harry giving evidence regarding their successful deception of poor Beatrice. Harry's evidence was largely of negative format i.e. admitting there was no Walter Palmer in Canterbury, that Mrs Read did not know of "Mrs Benson" etc. Harry claimed no knowledge of the telegram written on Friday 22 June despite it being in his handwriting and in a distinctive purple pencil which he used. He had no knowledge of the murder.

No witnesses were brought in for the defence, but the defence tried to find holes in the prosecution evidence. This failed. As was normal at that time the accused was not allowed to speak. The defence greatly criticised the influence of the press which had preceded and surrounded the case in what would now be called trial by media. The most bizarre element of the defence was that Read had actually been with a further lover on the weekend of 23/24 June and that either Mrs Ayriss killed Florence or that a soldier in Hounslow Barracks had got her pregnant and killed her. No evidence was forwarded to support either theory. It was admitted Read had the various affairs and stole the money but there was no evidence he had been in Southend/Prittlewell that weekend. There was also medical evidence that Florence died at around 1am, which is sadly more indicative of a non-instantaneous death than an error in evidence.

On day four, Thursday 15 November, Lockwood criticised the accusations pointed at Mrs Ayriss, and pointed out the numerous holes in the defence not least of which was any kind of alibi. If Read was not there, where was he? The sound of the small revolver would have carried no more than 200 yards and could easily have gone unnoticed, indeed the choice of site was suitably remote not to be heard. Judge Pollock summed up at 11.30am. The jury were instructed to try to ignore Read's general immoral behaviour. He excused Mrs Ayris's retracted statement that she saw Read that day as a lapse of memory. Read and his defence had not explained what happened to the revolver known to be in his possession and no witnesses had been produced to evidence that he was anywhere else but Southend. The summation took 80 minutes. The jury retired at 12.50 and returned at 1.30pm. The foreman, George Thorpe Bartrum of Braintree, announced the verdict of "guilty". Judge Pollock donned his black cap and asked Read to stand. The death sentence was announced and several women wept.

Post-sentence Read claimed to have been with Bertha Ayriss on the Sunday evening. Some evidence supports this but does not preclude him from having shot Florence. Read petitioned the Home Secretary H. H. Asquith seeking review, but this was denied. On the morning of 30 November his wife Emma Read saw him for the last time. She came with Harry and his sister "Miss Read". It is unclear if he made any apologies. Harry visited on Saturday afternoon. The Home Secretary's dismissal of appeal arrived late on Saturday after Harry's departure. This decision was announced in the Sunday newspapers. Harry visited one last time on the Monday with another sister, Mrs Kelly.

The poet Robert Williams Buchanan actively campaigned for Read's release and proclaimed his innocence in columns of newspapers at his own expense. These pleas were ignored. Eugen Oswald and the Carlyle Society also campaigned for Read's release.

Read was hanged at Chelmsford Prison at 8.03am on the foggy morning of Tuesday 4 December 1894. The hangman was James Billington. His final words were "Will it hurt?". As was the custom of the day, the jury visited the prison later that day to view the dead body and confirm that sentence had been carried out. Read was then buried in an unmarked grave in the prison grounds.

However, a final letter from James to Harry asked him to find more evidence supporting his whereabouts on the night of 24/25 June. A local reporter on 4 December established that James Read had indeed spent the night in a guesthouse in Southend: Gresham Villas (which Read had misremembered as Granville Villas). Several residents and primarily a Mr Sicely stated that Read had gone to bed just after 10.30pm and risen for breakfast at 7am taking the 8am train back to London. This evidence, though puzzling, does nothing to disprove his murder of Florence, as it is only 20 minutes walk from the murder site, and merely casts doubt on his long walk home. More curiously Read was heard to have a guest somewhat after 10.30 - possibly Bertha - which would account for various things. The landlady, Mrs Clothier had apparently confirmed to police that Read 'had been there that night but placed his time of return at 11.15pm. She confirmed he also stayed there on the Saturday night. It may even be that he attempted to walk to London thereafter and could have reached Benfleet by 1.15am... but did he give up and go back to Southend? Doing the maths he could have realised the first train could get him to Leytonstone and could arrive at work slightly late with no great query without a huge walk. This abnormality does nothing to prove his innocence but perhaps highlights the perils of being a compulsive liar.

== Aftermath ==
The bullet (a 7-Eley) which killed Florence Dennis is part of the collection of the Crime Museum at New Scotland Yard.

"Mrs Benson"'s (Beatrice Diva Kempton's) father died of a heart attack during the course of the trial due to the stress. Mrs Emma Read lived the rest of her life impoverished and shamed but her children largely fared well. The last to die, Winifred Gwendoline Read, died in 1974 aged 83.

Mr John Ayris divorced Bertha (not unsurprisingly). Although listed as a dairyman he seems to be part of the Ayris/Ayres family connected to Southend Waterworks.

There was a strong implication that Bertha knew more about the shooting than was revealed and she admitted seeing Read on the day of the murder. Read also claimed that she had been given the revolver. If so this means that Read saw her after the murder and before his walk home. This aspect was never investigated.

Harry Read, who was not charged with anything, certainly knew a great deal and abetted if perhaps not aiding the crime. Given his close relationship with James it is hard to believe that he did not know his intentions. He committed suicide by drowning himself in the River Thames a few days after James' execution. However one source states that a warrant was put on Harry and he fled to Australia.
