= Robert Buchanan (Owenite) =

Scottish socialist writer and lecturer

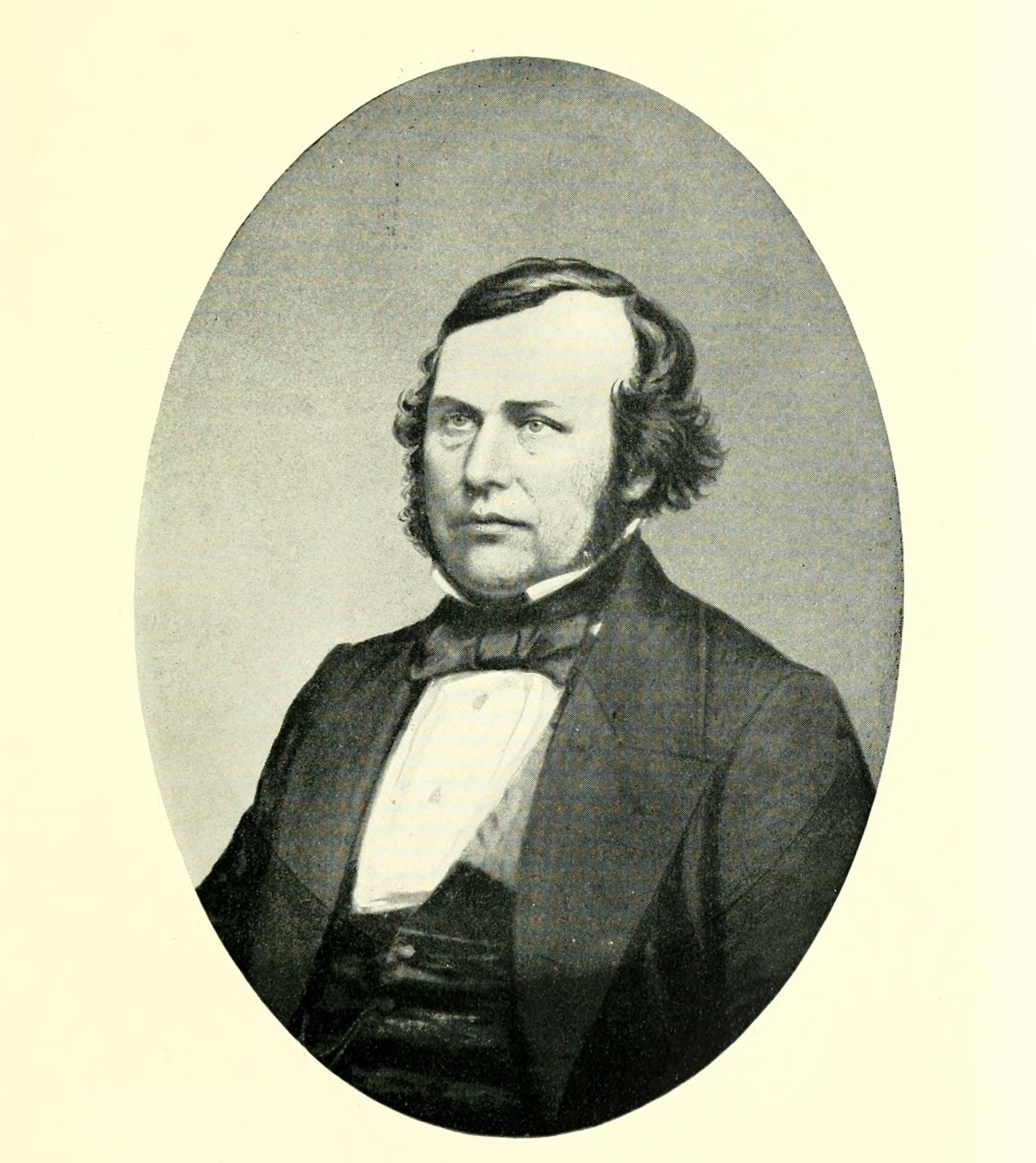
Robert Buchanan

Robert Buchanan (1813–1866) was a Scottish socialist writer and lecturer, and journalist.

== Early life ==
Buchanan was born at Ayr. He was successively a weaver-teacher, and then manager of a news-room (a reading room for newspapers) in Huddersfield. He was taken on as an Owenite "social missionary", a lecturer advocating the socialist views of Robert Owen, in 1838.

== Manchester period ==
Manchester was an important centre of Owenism, and Buchanan settled there, producing publications. A contributor to Northern Star, the organ of the Chartist movement, Buchanan was never a "physical force" militant. He did become involved in public controversies with Methodists. One opponent was Joseph Barker, an unorthodox Methodist based in Gateshead from 1839: Barker had a high profile in attacking Owenites.

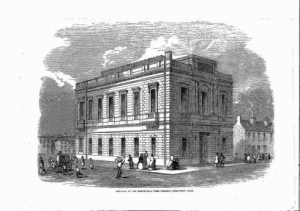
The Manchester Hall of Science, Campfield, after its 1850 conversion to Manchester Free Library

Closer to hand was Rev. William John Kidd, from 1840 of the Didsbury chapel, Manchester, previously the rector of St Matthew's Church, Manchester. St Matthew's was opposite the "Hall of Science" built by the Owenites in 1839. The socialists meeting there were prosecuted for having lectures on Sunday and charging for admission, contrary to a statute of George II. They were prepared to show that the "collection" had been a voluntary one, but when witnesses declined to take the oath there was no legal defence, and they were fined. The context was a claim, in the Owenite New Moral World of 11 April 1840, that the Halls of Science were "churches of the people". The legal implication was that the corresponding "ministers" be prepared to take oaths, under legislation of George III for nonconformists.

The building was registered as the meeting-house of a society of dissenters by the name of "Rational Religionists". Buchanan and another "social missionary", Lloyd Jones, came forward, willing to take oaths under some conditions. Kidd, aided by T. P. Bunting, son of the Wesleyan minister Jabez Bunting, had the magistrate put to Buchanan the oaths that by statute were required from dissenting ministers. Buchanan postponed the decision, costing him some derision from the secularist side, but eventually swore. Bunting then managed to draw from him a declaration that he did not believe in the orthodox doctrines of damnation. The matter ended with Buchanan being fined.

Buchanan started the Rational Religionist paper in 1841. In August of that year he attempted to enter the Anti-Corn Law meeting of ministers in Manchester Town Hall, with Lloyd Jones and Alexander Campbell (1796–1870), also an Owenite. He was attacked at Whitehaven in a Methodist chapel in 1842, and gave up lecturing.

== Later life ==
Buchanan moved to Norwood in Surrey, and worked as a press reporter. In 1848 he was one of the founders of the League of Social Progress, brought together by sometime Owenite leaders. Its direction was "Home Colonies" and the co-operative movement, bringing Buchanan into contact with George Holyoake.

From 1850 to 1860 Buchanan edited the Glasgow Sentinel, owned by Alexander Gardner, which became a freethinking and radical paper. On the Preston strike of 1853 the Sentinel took the line that the solution was arbitration. On the staff as industrial reporter was Alexander Campbell; Hugh Macdonald was a staff journalist also, though briefly. Another socialist writer in the Sentinel of this period was Lloyd Jones. Buchanan himself was involved in local politics, but became unpopular. He bought the Glasgow Times and Penny Post, but bankrupted himself by these deals in publishing and printing, in 1856.

Buchanan died at his son's house at Bexhill, Sussex, on 4 March 1866.

== Works ==
Buchanan wrote:

- The Religion of the Past and Present Society, founded upon a false fundamental principle inimical to the extension of real knowledge opposed to human happiness, Manchester, 1839.
- The Origin and Nature of Ghosts, Demons, and Spectral Illusions generally, fully and familiarly explained and illustrated, Manchester, 1840, a pamphlet discussing hallucination.
- An Exposure of the Falsehoods, Calumnies, and Misrepresentations of a Pamphlet entitled "The Abominations of Socialism Exposed," being a refutation of the charges and statements of the Rev. Joseph Barker, Manchester, 1840; two editions.
- Concise History of Modern Priestcraft, from the time of Henry VIII until the present period, Manchester, 1840; an attack on the Church of England. A chapter is devoted to the "persecution of the socialists", and another to the "crimes of the clergy".'
- The Past, the Present, and the Future, Manchester, 1840. In blank verse.
- Socialism Vindicated was a reply to a sermon preached by the Rev. W. J. Kidd of Didsbury, Manchester, 1840.

== Family ==
Buchanan married Margaret Williams in 1840, at Stoke-on-Trent. Their son Robert Williams Buchanan was born in 1841. Wife and son took up residence at the Ham Common Concordium in 1842, when Buchanan moved south.
