= Robert Williams Buchanan =

Scottish poet, novelist and dramatist

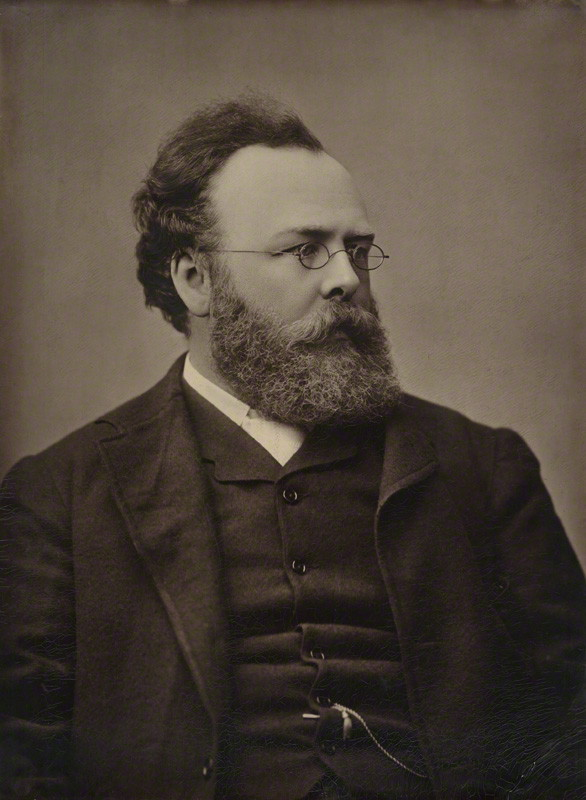
- Robert Williams Buchanan, by Herbert Rose Barraud, c. 1893.
- Born: 18 August 1841; Caverswall, Staffordshire, England
- Died: 10 June 1901 (aged 59); Streatham, England
- Occupations: Poet, novelist, dramatist

Signature
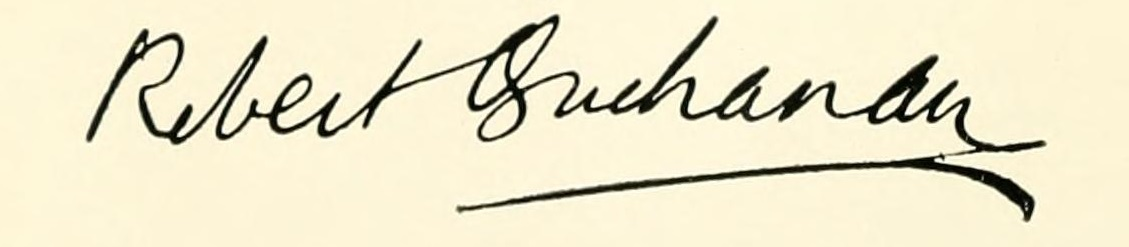

Robert Williams Buchanan (18 August 1841 – 10 June 1901) was a Scottish poet, novelist and dramatist. Several of his works were adapted into films.

== Early life and education ==
He was the son of Robert Buchanan (1813–1866), Owenite lecturer and journalist, and was born at Caverswall, Staffordshire, England. Buchanan senior, a native of Ayr, Scotland, lived for some years in Manchester, then moved to Glasgow, where Buchanan junior was educated, at the high school and the university, one of his fellow-students being the poet David Gray. His essay on Gray, originally published in the Cornhill Magazine, tells the story of their close friendship, and of their journey to London in 1860 in search of fame.

His friend, Scottish-American poet James Mackintosh Kennedy, wrote in Scottish and American Poems: "Robert Buchanan, the well-known British poet and most genial and variously gifted man, visited America in 1884-85." He wrote two poems about Buchanan: "Lament" on his departure, and "Robert Buchanan" upon his death. Kennedy's son, born in 1885, was named Robert Buchanan Kennedy.

== Writings ==
My girl hath violet eyes and yellow hair,
A soft hand, small and fair.
A sweet face pouting in a white straw bonnet,
A tiny foot and a little boot upon it.
And all her finery to charm the beholders –
Is the gray shawl drawn tight around her shoulders.
The plain stuff-gown and collar white as snow,
And sweet red petticoat that peeps below.
But gladly in the busy town goes she,
Summer and winter, fearing nobodie.
She pats the pavement with her fairy feet,
With fearless eyes she charms the crowded street.

— From "The Little Milliner" by Robert Williams Buchanan

Buchanan's first published works were books of poetry written while he was still living in Glasgow. He appears to have disowned them later in life as they fail to appear in any bibliographic references. His first book was Poems and Love Lyrics which although undated was probably published in 1857. It was reviewed in the Athenaeum in December 1857. Although the review date is not conclusive the date is almost certainly 1857 or 1858 for the following reasons. (1) The author's second book Mary and other Poems is by the 'Author of Lyrics'. This book is dated 1859 and signed Robt W Buchanan in the preface; (2) The preface to 'Mary' states that this is the author's second published book; (3) The preface indicates that the writer is still a young man; (4) The dedication to Hugh Macdonald suggests he was alive when it was written. Macdonald, a well-known Glaswegian, died in 1860. Buchanan's second book Mary and other Poems was published in 1859 and has never been mentioned in any bibliographies. The book is extremely rare and the only copies appear to be in the Mitchell library in Glasgow. Buchanan also published a collection of short stories and poems, written in collaboration with Charles Gibbon, entitled Storm-beaten, or Christmas Eve at the "Old Anchor" Inn in 1862, before Undertones, which is often cited as Buchanan's first book.

After a period of struggle and disappointment Buchanan published Undertones in 1863. This tentative volume had some success, and was followed by Idyls and Legends of Inverburn (1865), London Poems (1866), and North Coast and other Poems (1868), wherein he displayed a faculty for poetic narrative, and a sympathetic insight into the humbler conditions of life.

Buchanan showed more ambition in The Book of Orm: A Prelude to the Epic, a study in mysticism, which appeared in 1870. His works gave him a growing reputation, and raised high hopes of his future. Thereafter he would take up prose fiction and the drama, not always with success. He was a frequent contributor to periodicals, and obtained notoriety as a result of an article which, under the pen name of Thomas Maitland, he contributed to The Contemporary Review for October 1871. Entitled The Fleshly School of Poetry, this article was expanded into a pamphlet (1872), but he subsequently withdrew from the criticisms it contained, and it is chiefly remembered by the replies it evoked from Dante Gabriel Rossetti in a letter to the Athenaeum (16 December 1871), entitled "The Stealthy School of Criticism", and from Algernon Charles Swinburne in Under the Microscope (1872).

Buchanan afterwards regretted the violence of his attack, and the old enemy to whom God and the Man is dedicated was Rossetti. In 1876 The Shadow of the Sword, the first and one of the best of a long series of novels, was published. Buchanan was also the author of many successful plays, including Lady Clare, produced in 1883, Sophia (1886), an adaptation of Tom Jones; A Man's Shadow (1890), and The Charlatan (1894). He also wrote, in collaboration with Harriett Jay, the melodrama Alone in London (in which actress Cora Tanner starred). His latest poems, The Outcast: a Rhyme for the Time (1891) and The Wandering Jew (1893) were directed against certain aspects of Christianity. In 1896 he became, so far as some of his work was concerned, his own publisher. He was unfortunate in his latter years; a speculation turned out ruinously, and he had to sell his copyrights.

In November 1894 he campaigned very publicly for the release of murderer and bigamist James Canham Read, known as the Southend Murderer. His campaign was unsuccessful and Read was hanged on 4 December.

In the autumn of 1900 he had a paralytic seizure, from which he never recovered. He died at Streatham. He is buried in a family grave in the cemetery of St. John the Baptist Church, Southend-on-Sea, Essex, where there is a memorial to him.

Buchanan's poems were collected into three volumes in 1874, into one volume in 1884; and as Complete Poetical Works (2 vols., 1901). Among his poems should also be mentioned:

- The Drama of Kings (1871)
- St Abe and his Seven Wives, a lively tale of Salt Lake City, Utah, published anonymously in 1872
- Balder the Beautiful (1877)
- The City of Dream (1888)

His earlier novels, The Shadow of the Sword, and God and the Man (1881), a striking tale of a family feud, are distinguished by a certain breadth and simplicity of treatment which is not so noticeable in their successors, among which may be mentioned:

- The Martyrdom of Madeline (1882)
- Foxglove Manor (1885)
- Effie Hetherington (1896)
- Matt: A Story of A Caravan (1897)
- Father Anthony (1898)In November
- Lady Kilpatrick (1898)
- David Gray and other Essays, chiefly on Poetry (1868)
- Master Spirits (1873)
- A Poet's Sketch Book (1883), in which the interesting essay on Gray is reprinted
- A Look round Literature (1887), and the previous volume contain Buchanan's chief contributions to periodical literature
- The Land of Lorne (2 vols., 1871), a vivid record of yachting experiences on the west coast of Scotland.
- The Master of the Mine (1885), originally serialised by the Illustrated London News in 1867.

=== Selected articles ===
- (1872). "Bjørnstjerne Bjørnson," The Contemporary Review 21, pp. 45–62.
- (1876). "Æschylus and Victor Hugo," The New Quarterly Magazine 5, pp. 263–301.
- (1876). "Lucretius and Modern Materialism," The New Quarterly Magazine 6, pp. 1–31.
- (1885). "Free Thought in America," The North American Review, No. 341, pp. 316–327.
- (1889). "The Modern Young Man as a Critic," The Universal Review 3, pp. 353–372.

=== Publication in other languages ===
- God and the Man was translated into German by Peter M. Richter as "Christian" (Engelsdorfer Verlag Leipzig, 2007).

== Adaptations ==
Meg Blane: A Rhapsody of the Sea, a cantata for mezzo-soprano, chorus, and orchestra by Samuel Coleridge-Taylor, is based on a poem by Buchanan; it was completed in 1902 and premiered to great acclaim that October in Sheffield. Another Buchanan poem "Fra Giacomo" served as the text for a dramatic monologue for baritone and orchestra by Cecil Coles, completed in 1914.

Several films were adapted from his work.
