= Adolf Beck case =

Notorious wrongful conviction by mistaken identity

The Adolf Beck case was a notorious incident of wrongful conviction by eyewitness misidentification, brought about by unreliable methods of identification, erroneous eyewitness testimony, and a rush to convict the accused. As one of the best known causes célèbres of its time, the case led to the creation of the English Court of Criminal Appeal in 1907.

== Biographical background ==
Adolf (or Adolph) Beck was born in Norway in 1841, and educated as a chemist. However, he went to sea soon afterwards and moved to England in 1865, working as a clerk to a shipping broker. In 1868 he moved to South America, where he made a living for a while as a singer, then became a shipbroker, and also engaged in buying and selling houses. He soon amassed a considerable amount of savings, at one time earning £8,000 as commission for a sale of a Spanish concession in the Galapagos Islands. He returned to England in 1885 and engaged in various financial schemes, including an investment in a copper mine in Norway. Unfortunately the mine did not turn a profit, and he poured in more and more money until he had to put the mine up for sale. There were no takers and he was reduced to near-poverty. He was chronically short of money, in debt to the hotel in Covent Garden where he lived and had borrowed money from his secretary. Nevertheless, he tried to keep up appearances by dressing in a frock coat and top hat whenever he went out, even though they had become threadbare.

== Arrest ==
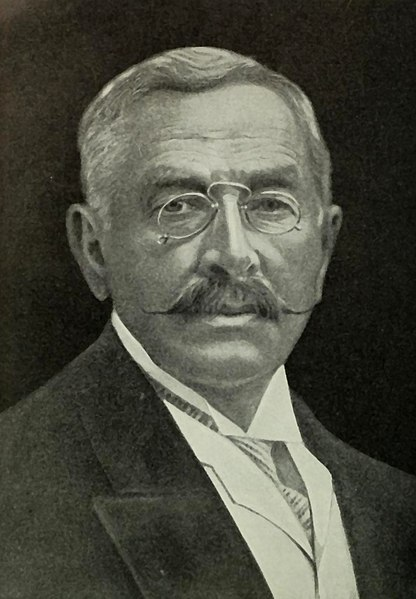
Adolf Beck

On 16 December 1895 Beck was stepping out of the front door of 135 Victoria Street (or 139, according to at least one account) when a woman blocked his way. She accused him of having tricked her out of two watches and several rings. Beck brushed her aside and crossed the road. When the woman followed him, he complained to a policeman that he was being followed by a prostitute who had accosted him. The woman in turn demanded his arrest, accusing him of having swindled her three weeks earlier. The policeman took them both to the nearest police station, where the woman identified herself as Ottilie Meissonier, unmarried, and a language teacher. She alleged that she had been walking down Victoria Street when Beck approached her, tipping his hat and asking if she was Lady Everton. She said that she was not, but she was impressed by his gentlemanly manner and they struck up a conversation. According to her account, he introduced himself as "Lord Willoughby" and advised her that the flower show she was heading for was not worth visiting. He said that he knew horticulture because he had gardens on his Lincolnshire estate which were extensive enough to require six gardeners. Meissonier mentioned that she grew chrysanthemums; he asked her whether he might see them and she invited him to tea the following day.

At her home the next day, he invited her to go to the French Riviera on his yacht. He insisted upon providing her with an elegant wardrobe for the voyage, wrote out a list of items for her and made out a cheque for £40 to cover her purchases. Then he examined her wristwatch and rings, and asked her to let him have them so that he could match their sizes and replace them with more valuable pieces. After he left, she discovered that a second watch was missing. Suspicious, she hurried to the bank to cash the cheque, only to find that it was worthless. She had been swindled and she swore that it was Adolf Beck who had done it. He was promptly arrested.

The inspector who was assigned to the case learned that in the previous two years twenty-two women had been defrauded by a grey-haired man who called himself "Lord Wilton de Willoughby" and used the same modus operandi as Beck's accuser had described. These women were asked to view a line-up that included Beck along with ten or fifteen men who had been selected randomly from the street. Because he was the only one with grey hair and a moustache he was quickly identified by the women as the man who had defrauded them.

Beck was charged with ten misdemeanours and four felonies. The felony charges were based on presumed prior convictions in 1877, when a man named John Smith had been sentenced to five years for swindling unattached women by using the name Lord Willoughby, writing worthless cheques and taking their jewellery. He had disappeared after his release, and it was assumed that Beck and Smith were one and the same. Descriptions of John Smith from prison files were never compared with the current appearance of Adolph Beck.

At Beck's committal hearing, in late 1895, one of the policemen who had arrested Smith eighteen years before was called to testify. Eless Henry Spurrell (1847-1906), who had retired in 1892, gave his account as follows:

In 1877 I was [a PC] in the Metropolitan Police Reserve [of E Division]. On 7 May 1877 I was present at the Central Criminal Court where the prisoner in the name of John Smith was convicted of feloniously stealing ear-rings and a ring and eleven shillings of Louisa Leonard and was sentenced to five years' penal servitude. I produce the certificate of that conviction. The prisoner is the man. ... There is no doubt whatever – I know quite well what is at stake on my answer and I say without doubt he is the man.

Beck protested and insisted that he could bring witnesses from South America to prove that he was there in 1877.

== Trial ==
On 3 March 1896 Beck was brought to trial at the Old Bailey. The Crown was represented by Horace Edmund Avory, assisted by Guy Stephenson, while the defence was headed by an experienced barrister, Charles Gill, who was assisted by Percival Clarke. The judge was Sir Forrest Fulton, who, as a prosecutor, had been responsible for sending John Smith to prison in 1877.

The defence's strategy was to argue that this was a case of mistaken identity. If they could prove that Beck was in South America at the time when John Smith was committing his crimes and went to prison for them, they could undermine the allegation that Adolph Beck was John Smith.

A handwriting expert named Thomas Gurrin compared the lists of clothing Smith had given his victims in 1877 to those written in 1894 and 1895, as well as to samples of Beck's handwriting. Gill thought that he would have his chance to prove mistaken identity when he cross-examined Gurrin. If Gurrin testified in court, as he had said previously, that the writing from 1877 was identical to that from 1894 and 1895, Gill could bring witnesses to show that Beck had been in Buenos Aires in 1877. Avory, foreseeing this tactic, asked the witness only about the later lists. Gurrin said that these had been written by Beck with a "disguised hand". Gill then asked Justice Fulton's permission to question Gurrin about the lists from 1877, but he ruled, in line with procedure in the English courts, that any earlier convictions of the defendant could not be mentioned in court until after the jury had given its verdict.

Avory did not want to call Elless Spurrell to give evidence because his testimony would have opened discussion of the past conviction, thereby allowing Gill the opportunity to cast doubt on Beck's guilt. Without Spurrell's testimony, Avory could still prosecute Beck for the misdemeanours, which did not require proof of prior conviction. He chose not to proceed with the felony charges, despite the fact that the prosecution case was based wholly on the unstated premise that Adolph Beck and John Smith were the same person.

Avory brought Beck's alleged victims into court and one after another they pointed to Beck as the swindler. There were, however, occasional moments of doubt. One mentioned that the swindler talked differently from Beck, peppering his speech with "Yankee" slang. Ottilie Meissonier remembered that the swindler had a scar on the right side of his neck, but was otherwise convinced that Beck was the man. Another testified that his mustache was longer and was waxed.

== Conviction and doubts ==
On 5 March 1896 Adolf Beck was found guilty of fraud and was sentenced to seven years of penal servitude at Portland Convict Prison on the Isle of Portland. In prison he was given John Smith's old prison number, D 523, with the letter W added, indicating a repeat convict.

England did not yet have a court of criminal appeal, but between 1896 and 1901 Beck's solicitor presented ten petitions for re-examination of his case. His requests to see the prison's description of John Smith were repeatedly denied. However, in May 1898 an official at the Home Office looked at the Smith file and saw that Smith was Jewish and thus had been circumcised, while Beck was not. The Home Office asked Sir Forrest Fulton for his opinion of this new evidence. Fulton wrote a minute dated 13 May in which he acknowledged that Smith and Beck could not be the same person but he added that, even if Beck was not Smith, he was still the impostor of 1895, and that he viewed the South American alibi "with great suspicion." As a result, the letter W was removed from Beck's prison number, but nothing else was done regarding the case.

While Beck remained in prison, George Robert Sims, a journalist who worked for the Daily Mail and had known Beck since his return to England in 1885, wrote an article in the paper emphasising that Beck had been tried on the assumption that he and Smith were the same person, yet no evidence to support that assumption had been allowed by Judge Fulton. Public opinion was slowly swayed by Sims and others, including Arthur Conan Doyle, to the view that Beck's conviction was unjust.

Beck was paroled in July 1901 for good behaviour.

== Second arrest and conviction ==
On 22 March 1904, a servant by the name of Paulina Scott filed a complaint that a grey-haired, distinguished looking man had accosted her on the street, paid compliments to her and then stolen her jewellery. The inspector who took the complaint was familiar with Beck's case and assumed he must be the culprit, so he sent Scott to the restaurant where Beck took his lunch. She did not recognise him but the inspector was undeterred by the woman's uncertainty and set a trap for him.

On 15 April 1904, as Beck left his flat, Scott ran up to him and accused him of defrauding her of her jewellery. Beck was horrified and denied the charge. Scott repeated her accusations and told him that someone was waiting to arrest him. He ran away in panic, but was caught immediately by the waiting police inspector, who arrested him at once. Beck's panicked flight reinforced the inspector's assumption regarding his guilt.

He was again put on trial on 27 June at the Old Bailey before Sir William Grantham. Five women identified him and, based on this positive identification, he was found guilty by the jury. The judge, however, was dissatisfied about the case and expressed some doubts regarding it. Despite assurances from the Home Office and the police of Beck's guilt, he decided to postpone sentencing. Ten days later the case was solved once and for all.

== Truth about John Smith ==
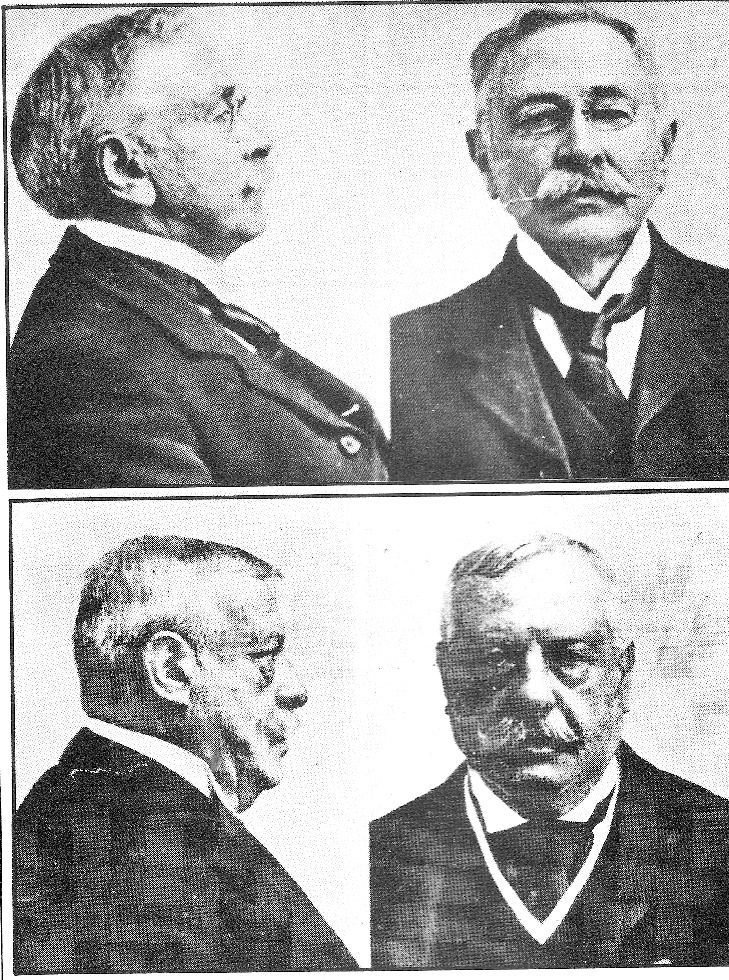
Police photographs of Beck (top) and Meyer

On a routine visit to the Tottenham Court Road police station on 7 July, Inspector John Kane of the Criminal Investigation Department was told of the arrest of a man who had tried to swindle some rings from a pair of unemployed actresses that afternoon and had been apprehended at a pawnshop. The detective was familiar with the Beck case, having been present at Beck's two trials and asked for details. The details fitted the usual pattern but the alleged culprit, Adolph Beck, was already in jail, awaiting sentencing.

The inspector went to the new prisoner's cell. It held a grey-haired man, approximately of Beck's height, with certain features which made him resemble Beck. However, Beck was younger and frailer in build, and this man had a scar on the right side of his neck, as Ottilie Meissoner remembered. The prisoner had given his name as William Thomas but the inspector, convinced that he was John Smith, informed Scotland Yard. Three of the five women who identified Beck in his second trial were brought in to confront Thomas and they quickly identified him as the swindler (the other two had gone abroad and thus were not present). Other swindled women were brought in who also admitted their error in identifying Beck. When the man who had been John Smith's landlord in 1877 identified Thomas as his former tenant, the prisoner confessed his crimes.

"William Thomas" turned out to be as much an alias as "John Smith" had been, and he had two other aliases as well, "William Wyatt" and "William Weiss". His true identity was Wilhelm Meyer, born in Vienna and graduated from the University of Vienna. He studied leprosy in the Hawaiian Islands under Father Joseph Damien. He later became surgeon to the King of Hawaii and was engaged in growing coffee, and in various other businesses in the United States, then setting up practice as a physician in Adelaide before moving to London. Apparently he fell upon hard times there, and turned to preying on women through fraud. When Beck was sent to prison in his place, Meyer had returned to the United States and did not come back until 1903, apparently when he thought Beck had served out his sentence. Thomas then resumed his swindling until he was finally arrested. When brought to trial on 15 September, Wilhelm Meyer pleaded guilty to those offences and was jailed for 5 years.

== Aftermath ==
Adolf Beck was given a free pardon by the King on 29 July 1904 and in compensation for his false imprisonment was awarded £2,000, later raised to £5,000 due to public clamour (about £600,000 as of May 2023), again due to George Robert Sims, but those who were responsible were the subject of public indignation.

Eventually, a Committee of Inquiry was established, headed by the noted jurist and Master of the Rolls, Sir Richard Henn Collins. It heard evidence from all those involved in the case, including Horace Avory and Sir Forrest Fulton. In its report, it concluded that Adolph Beck should not have been convicted due to the errors made by the prosecution. The committee also chastised Judge Fulton in his conduct of the case, as he should have given consideration to the 1877 case, more so because of his involvement with it, which served to prejudice the proceedings against Beck. Furthermore, it criticised the Home Office for its indifference in acting on the case despite knowing since 1898 that Beck and Smith were not the same man. Instead, it sought to preserve the credibility of the judiciary rather than admit or correct its mistakes. It also stated that the omission of the prison authorities to state the fact of Smith's circumcision in the records of 1877 and 1881 was the primary cause of the miscarriage of justice.

As a direct result of the case, important reforms resulted, including the creation of the Court of Criminal Appeal. The case is still cited by judges in Commonwealth countries as a glaring example of how inaccurate eyewitness identification can be, and the extreme care with which juries must regard evidence of this kind. As for Adolf Beck, his exoneration brought him little consolation. He died a broken man of pleurisy and bronchitis in Middlesex Hospital on 7 December 1909 and was buried in an unmarked grave on the eastern side of Highgate Cemetery.
