= Aberlemno =

Parish and small village in Angus, Scotland

Coordinates: 56.69146°N 2.78364°W

Aberlemno: Scottish Gaelic: Obar Leamhnach
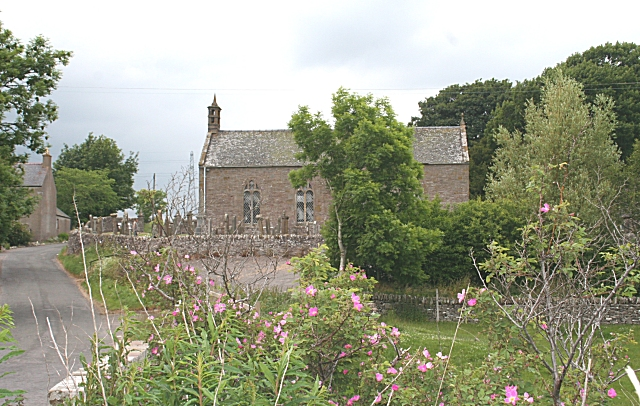
- Aberlemno Kirk

- Location within Angus
- Population: 544 (2011 Census)
- OS grid reference: NO521558
- Council area: Angus
- Lieutenancy area: Angus
- Country: Scotland
- Sovereign state: United Kingdom
- Post town: FORFAR
- Postcode district: DD8
- Dialling code: 01307
- Police: Scotland
- Fire: Scottish
- Ambulance: Scottish
- UK Parliament: Angus and Perthshire Glens
- Scottish Parliament: Angus North and Mearns

Aberlemno (Scottish Gaelic: Obar Leamhnach, IPA:[ˈopəɾˈʎɛunəx]) is a parish and small village in the Scottish council area of Angus. It is noted for three large carved Pictish stones (and one fragment) dating from the 7th and 8th centuries AD (Historic Scotland); the stones can be viewed at any time in spring-autumn, but are covered by wooden boxes in the winter to prevent frost damage. Two stones (and the fragment) stand by the B9134 Forfar-Brechin road, the Kirkyard Stone stands in the nearby graveyard of the parish church.

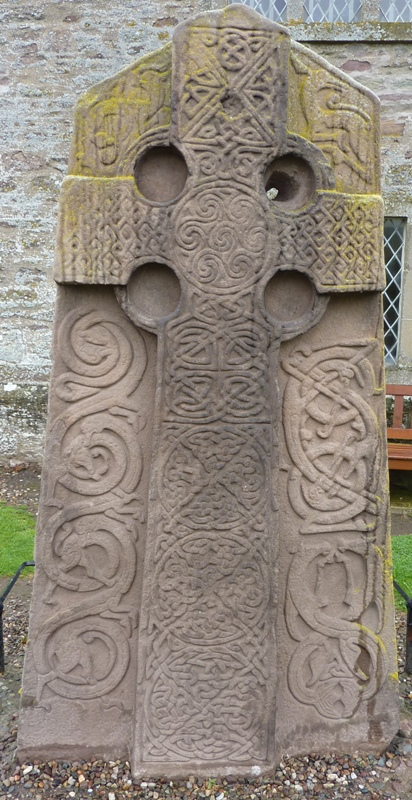
The cross slab in the kirkyard. Class II Pictish stone.

The parish of Aberlemno had a population of 544 at the 2011 Census.

A genus of fossil plants first found in a nearby quarry is named Aberlemnia in honour of the location.

A notable Scottish-American poet, engineer, and editor, James Mackintosh Kennedy, was born in Aberlemno in 1848, and developed his interest in literature through books lent to him by the Aberlemno church.

The Parish was the location of a Royal Observer Corps monitoring bunker between 1961 and 1968. It remains mostly intact and as of 2015, it was being restored.

== Sculptured Stones ==
Aberlemno is notable for the presence of four early Medieval standing stones, as well as a fifth that is currently on display at McManus Galleries in Dundee.

== See also ==
- List of places in Angus
