= Horace Avory =

English High Court judge (1851–1935)

Sir Horace Avory.

Sir Horace Edmund Avory (31 August 1851 – 13 June 1935) was an English barrister and High Court judge.

== Biography ==
He was the son of Henry Avory, clerk of the Central Criminal Court. He was educated at King's College London, and Corpus Christi College, Cambridge, where he was captain of boats and took the degree of LL.B. in 1874. He became a barrister of the Inner Temple in 1875 and married Maria Louisa Castle in 1877. He was elected bencher in 1908 and was knighted and made a judge, later to become a senior judge, of the King's Bench division in 1910. He received a Hon.D.LL. degree in 1911 and was made treasurer in 1929. He died at Rye, East Sussex.

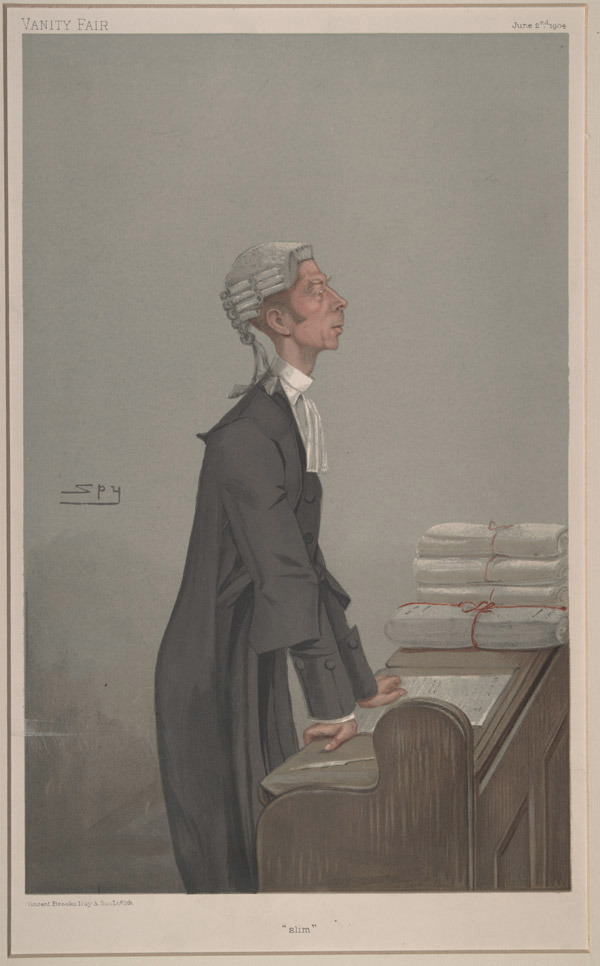
"slim" Avory KC as caricatured by Spy (Leslie Ward) in Vanity Fair, June 1904

Avory was one of the most noted English criminal lawyers of the late 19th and early 20th centuries. He was involved in many sensational trials and became a household word as the most dreaded "hanging judge" of his age. He was called "thin-lipped, cold, utterly unemotional, silent, and humourless, and relentless towards lying witnesses and brutal criminals" and "impervious to bluff and merciless to perjury". He was nicknamed "The Acid Drop" in legal circles, due to his caustic wit in court. In private life, however, he showed a different face.

Famous cases in which he appeared to include the trials of Adolf Beck, Sir Roger Casement, Oscar Wilde (as prosecuting counsel), Jean-Pierre Vaquier, Patrick Mahon, Robert Coombes and Clarence Hatry. His prosecution of Adolf Beck contributed to one of the most significant miscarriages of justice in English legal history. Beck was wrongly identified by ten women as a swindler and was sentenced to seven years.

In recognition of his achievements, both Corpus Christi College (Cambridge), and the Honourable Society of the Inner Temple have student scholarships in the name of Horace Avory.

A portrait in oils by Charles Freegrove Winzer is owned by Corpus Christi.

== Death ==
According to Time magazine's report of his death, "Avory had gone for a chill walk during his Whitsuntide holiday. That night an old friend, the Lord Chief Justice of England, Lord Hewart, called and as a precaution ordered two hot water bottles and personally tucked the Hanging Judge into bed. During the night he rolled off onto the floor, was found next morning entangled in a snarl of sheets and blankets, dead of heart failure and pernicious anemia."
