= Robert Coombes (murderer) =

British person convicted of matricide (1882–1949)

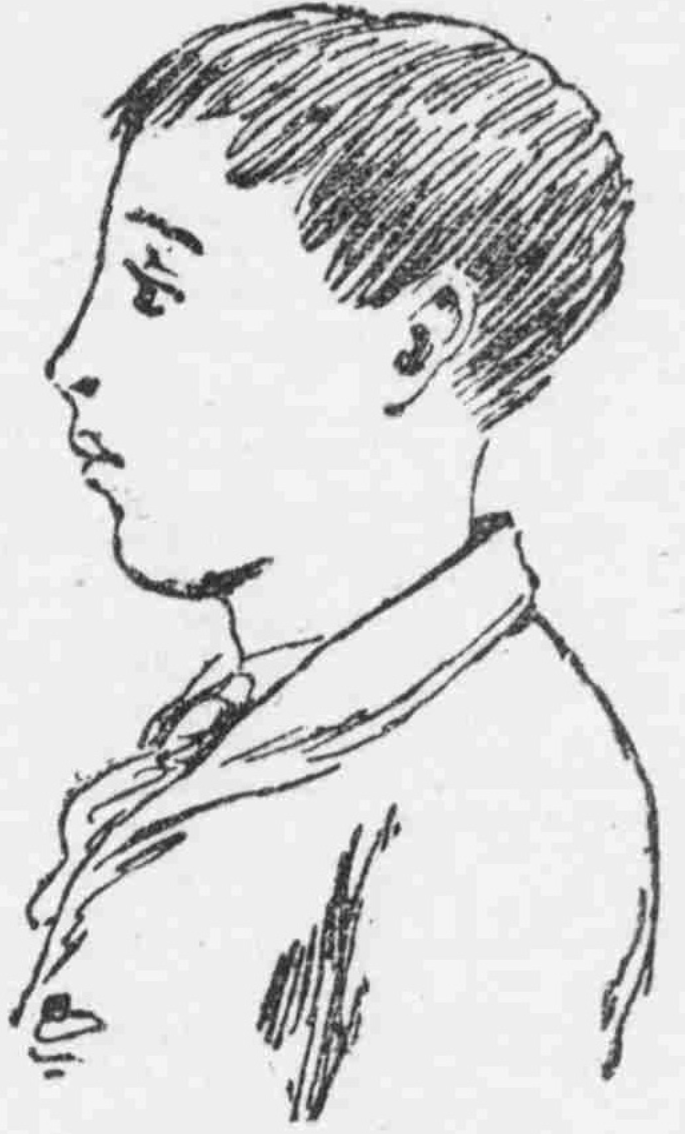
Courtroom sketch of Robert Coombes in the dock

Robert Allen Coombes MM (6 January 1882 – 7 May 1949) was an Englishman whose murder of his mother in 1895 at the age of 13 caused a media sensation, dubbed the Plaistow Horror. Contemporary descriptions suggest Robert had no moral compass, and was involved in many financial tricks, before turning to murder.

Robert was one of the only male prisoners in Holloway Prison and the youngest ever inmate of Broadmoor. He served 17 years in gaol for his crimes, being released at 30. Afterwards, he emigrated to Australia where he died at 67.

== Life ==
Robert Allen Coombes was born in Bethnal Green in London on 6 January 1882. He was the first son of Robert Coombes and his wife Emily Harrison Coombes (née Allen). His father was a steward on a transatlantic steamer, France, and was often away from home for prolonged periods. Robert was a forceps birth and had visible marks on each temple. He was baptised in April 1882, but the parents' surname was recorded as Allen instead of Coombes, which was the maiden name of his mother. His father was a butcher.

His brother Nathaniel George Coombes was born in February 1883.

Robert had severe headaches from the age of around three years. The doctor advised never to strike him on the head. The family moved to Liverpool and stayed with relatives in 1885/6. Their father stayed in Liverpool until 1892, when Emily and the boys returned to London. Their doctor Dr Coward began prescribing potassium bromide during the period of the father's absence.

Back in London in 1888, young Robert was exposed to the surrounding Whitechapel murders and Jack the Ripper and became obsessed with the cheap sensationalist papers known as penny dreadfuls. This interest was not discouraged.

In the winter of 1891–2, the family moved to 35 Cave Road in the Plaistow district of London's east end. The boys attended Grange Road School under headmaster George Charles Hollamby. Robert was described as exceptionally clever. He moved to Stock Street School under Jesse Smith in 1893. They later moved to Cave Street School in July 1894 under Charles Struler. At the latter, the headmaster was told that his absence from 12 September 1894 until 11 March 1895 was due to a "sea voyage". At the trial, his father explained this was a trip to New York. There was repeated truancy but he was thought a good pupil and very clever.

The school leaving age was then 11 years. Robert left school in June 1895 and briefly worked with a plater in the dockyard.

In November 1894, he had made complicated journeys alone to attend the trial of the murderer James Canham Read, the "Southend Murderer" (of Florence Dennis) at Chelmsford (Essex Assizes). Read was found guilty and hanged in December.

== Murder ==
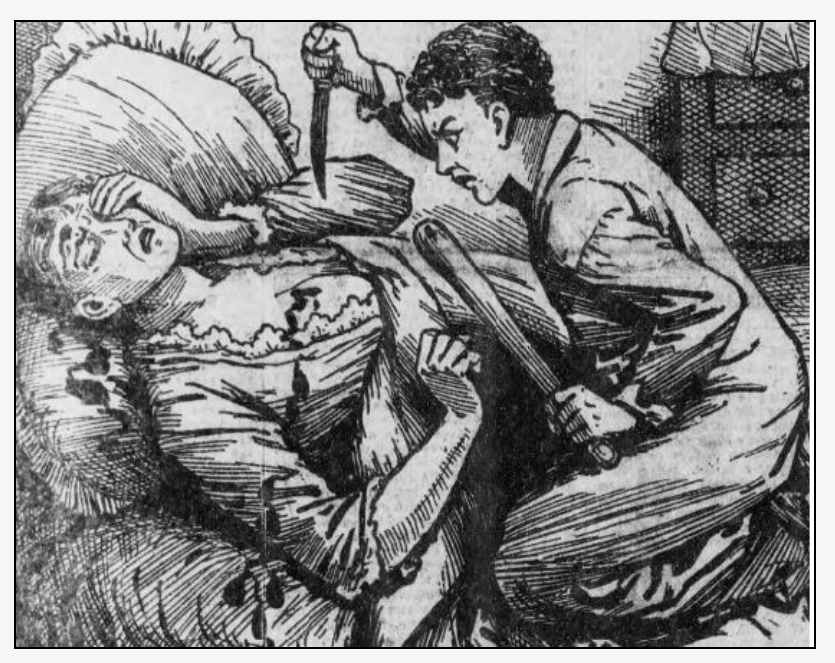
The murder of Emily Coombes by her son Robert

Both Robert and Nathaniel testified that Robert had purchased the knife himself with the express intention of killing his mother, a week or so before the event at the Brett's shop at 273 Barking Road for the price of five pence. The knife was first hidden in a dustbin in the back yard then in an unused chimney in the house.

Their father had left the family, as per his usual pattern, late on Friday or early on Saturday 6 July 1895, and left sufficient cash to last until his expected return.

On Sunday 7 July, Emily had beaten Nathaniel and he told Robert that he wanted to kill her. Around 3:45 am on Monday morning, Robert stabbed his mother in the heart twice as she lay in bed, having first struck her on the head with a truncheon. Robert, who had slept in his mother's room, seemingly went back to sleep. Between 8:30 and 9 am on the Monday he went to Nathaniel's room and told him that he had killed their mother. Nathaniel did not believe this and asked to see. Court evidence states the mother was still groaning in agony at 9 am. They covered her head and went out.

== Aftermath ==
Robert took a gold sovereign from his mother's purse on Monday morning and asked the neighbour James William Robertson at 33 Cave Road for change of the coin. He gave two half sovereigns in exchange and they gave him one and their mother's rent book asking him to pay their rent (7 shillings a week which was due every Monday), as their mother was away. He agreed. Robert returned at 7 pm to collect his three shillings change.

Later that day, and the day after, Robert used the remaining half sovereign. He and Nathaniel went to Lord's Cricket Ground to see the famous W. G. Grace play cricket as part of his "golden summer" of centuries.

On the Wednesday, Robert contacted 39-year-old John Fox at the Royal Albert Dock, where Fox did odd jobs for the National Steamship Company. Fox, who was mentally challenged, had been a seaman on the Egypt. Following a fire and loss of the ship, he had become too scared to go to sea again and worked in the dock area instead. Fox was a friend of his father and the two had probably worked together.

Young Robert asked Fox to look after them while his mother was "away" and to pawn items from the house, including his father's gold pocket watch, at George Fish's pawn shop in Poplar. Fox claimed to be Robert Coombes senior and got 10 shillings for the gold watch. He then went to a second pawn shop and pawned Coombes' silver watch and then a third, where he pawned a mandolin. Fox then came to stay with the boys, all sleeping in the lower rooms for the period.

On one night, the boys went to the Stratford Theatre, while Fox stayed alone in the house. The boys played cricket with Fox in the back yard on most evenings of the week in question.

On 13 July, John Fox went to John Hewson, the cashier of the National Steamship Company, with a letter allegedly from Robert Coombes junior, saying his mother was very ill with Bright's Disease and had a heavy doctor's bill to pay. It requested that Hewson advance the family £4 from their father's pay to pay this bill. Hewson requested a doctor's certificate. On Monday 15 July young Robert went to Hewson himself, with a fabricated letter alleging to be from J. J. Griffin, the local physician, confirming the mother's illness. Apparently two years earlier Robert had obtained £2 using a similar ruse. Hewson said he would go to their house to give his mother the money.

Neighbours became suspicious, and the boys' story that Emily had gone to Liverpool did not make sense. Neighbour Ms Burridge contacted Emily's sister-in-law, also Emily Coombes, to investigate. She attended on Monday 8 July but got no response. She returned on Monday 15 July; Fox (whom she did not know) answered the door. She was again told Ms Coombes was in Liverpool. She returned on Wednesday 17 July and got no response.

Returning in early afternoon she knocked and this time got into the house and was met by the boys and Fox. The bedroom door was locked and there was a bad smell. She obtained a spare key from the landlord and unlocked the door; she found the decomposing body of her sister-in-law, covered in maggots. Neighbours had noted many flies but had not noted any smell but this was put down to the proximity of much manure in nearby market gardens.

The police were summoned. Constable Robert Thwart came at 1:50 pm. Nathaniel had escaped through a window. More police arrived. Sergeant Henry Balch took Fox's statement. Robert and John Fox were arrested at the scene and held in the police cells at West Ham. Divisional Police Surgeon Alfred Kennedy removed the body. He described the head as "horribly decomposed". The bedsheets were covered in dried blood. The blood-covered knife still lay nearby.

The bedroom where the murder had taken place had been ransacked by Robert and the contents of the drawers were strewn around the room. He appeared to have been looking for more valuables to sell. He also found a letter from Robert to his father, not apologising for his crime, but contriving a complicated story about mother injuring her hand and not being able to write, and could he send money to cover various bills. There was an unsent advert to a local newspaper from young Robert, seeking a private loan of £30 in return for six monthly repayments of £6. The rent book was there showing the 7 shilling payment on 8 July, after the mother's death.

== Trial and imprisonment ==
Robert was moved to Holloway Prison on 18 July and remained there until the trial. He was observed by the Medical Officer, George Edward Walker, who on 10 August, on advice from the guards, moved him to a padded cell for his own safety. He told Walker he heard voices telling him to kill his mother and he had an "irresistible impulse to kill her". Walker noted that the pupils of his eyes would wander unequally during his headaches and noted the unusual scars from his forceps birth. Walker reported that the boy was greatly excited (in a positive way) regarding his forthcoming trial, and seemed to view this with glee. However he started to cry when he thought about missing his cats, and his mandolin.

The trial began at the Old Bailey on 9 September 1895. The jury were told to focus on the mental health of the boy. The prosecution was led by two famous barristers: Horace Avory and Guy Stephenson.

Robert's own letter to a neighbour was read out: "Dear Mr Shaw, I received your letter on last Tuesday. I think I will get hung but I do not care as long as I get a good breakfast before they hang me. If they do not hang me I think I will commit suicide. That will do just as well. I will strangle myself. I hope you are all well. I go up on Monday to the Old Bailey to be tried. I hope you will be there. I think they will sentence me to die. If they do I will call all the witnesses liars. I remain, yours affectionately R A Coombes". There followed two schoolboy sketches: firstly a figure being pushed towards a scaffold; secondly his own self on the scaffold being hanged with a bubble at his mouth saying "goodbye". It then continued as a "will" leaving thousands of pounds to various people.

The family doctor John Joseph Griffin testified that Robert had a history of headaches. There was no evidence to suggest a history of insanity, but the mother was described as nervous and hysterical. Robert was too young to hang in any case. Robert was concluded to be a homicidal maniac with lucid periods, and under influence of pernicious literature.

The court debated the nature of insanity and the understanding of right and wrong, especially in children. The prior purchase of the knife clearly indicated premeditation, but this might be argued as also done during a period of mania. Ultimately it was simpler to conclude him insane or temporarily insane. The medical evidence concluded he was wholly sane but lacked all moral understanding.

He was found guilty and sentenced to an indefinite period in Broadmoor Hospital for the Criminally Insane as its youngest inmate. Nathaniel was found not guilty. Despite Fox pawning the Coombes' goods, no guilt was found on his part.

Robert was released in 1912 after serving 17 years, aged 30.

== Later life ==
In early 1914, he emigrated to Australia where Nathaniel had gone during Robert's imprisonment. He enlisted in the Australian Imperial Force early in the First World War and won the Military Medal in October 1916 for conspicuous bravery as a stretcher-bearer during the Gallipoli Campaign.

After the war he worked on a farm at Nana Glen and taught music in the surrounding area of New South Wales. He then started his own market garden in the Glenreagh district.

Nathaniel was Chief Stoker on HMAS Australia in the First World War and died in Newcastle, New South Wales in 1946.

Robert died at Coffs Harbour Hospital on 7 May 1949, aged 67. He never married, but did have an adopted son to whom he left everything he owned. He is buried in Coffs Harbour Historic Cemetery, NSW.
