= Henry Stephenson (Royal Navy officer) =

British Royal Navy officer (1842–1919)

Admiral Sir Henry Stephenson GCVO KCB
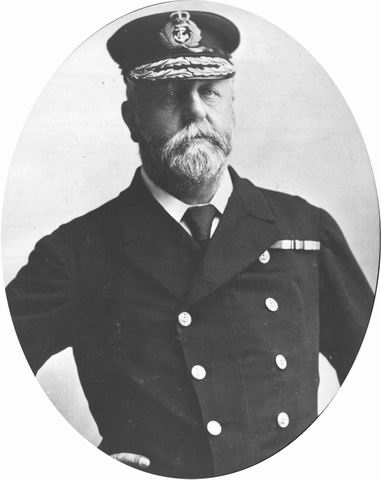
- Stephenson in 1896
- Born: Henry Frederick Stephenson; 7 June 1842; Broadstairs, Kent, England
- Died: 16 December 1919 (aged 77); London, Middlesex, England
- Military career
- Branch: Royal Navy
- Service years: 1855–1904
- Rank: Admiral
- Conflict(s): Crimean War; Second Opium War; Indian Rebellion of 1857; Fenian raids
- Awards: Knight Grand Cross of the Royal Victorian Order; Knight Commander of the Order of the Bath
- Other work: Black Rod

Sir Henry Frederick Stephenson GCVO KCB (7 June 1842 – 16 December 1919) was a Royal Navy officer, courtier, and Arctic explorer.

== Early life and career ==
Stephenson was the son of Henry Frederick Stephenson MP, (20 September 1790 – 30 July 1858, an illegitimate son of Charles Howard, 11th Duke of Norfolk) and Lady Mary Keppel. His eldest brother, Sir Augustus Keppel Stephenson, was a Treasury Solicitor, and the second person to hold the office of Director of Public Prosecutions in England and Wales.

On 18 December 1855 Stephenson joined the Royal Navy, becoming a Naval Cadet in HMS St Jean d'Acre, commanded by his uncle Henry Keppel, and serving in the Black Sea during the Crimean War. From September 1856 to April 1857 Stephenson served under Keppel as a cadet in HMS Raleigh, serving in the East Indies and China during the Second Anglo-Chinese War, until his ship wrecked near Macau when it struck an uncharted rock. All the crew were saved. In June 1857 he served as a Midshipman in HMS Pearl, serving with Pearl's Naval Brigade during the Indian Mutiny of 1857, during which he was Mentioned in Despatches three times. In June 1861 he was promoted to lieutenant in HMS Emerald, serving in the Channel Squadron.

On 30 March 1866 Stephenson was the lieutenant-in-command of HMS Heron, serving in North America and the West Indies, and becoming the commanding officer of a gun-boat on the Canadian lakes during the Fenian raids of 1866. From 18 January 1867 to 26 April 1868 he served as a lieutenant in HMS Rodney, commanded by Algernon C. F. Heneage, the flagship of Vice-Admiral Henry Keppel, serving in China. Following the death of Commander John T. Swann, Keppel promoted Stephenson to commander on 26 April 1868; the promotion was confirmed by the Admiralty on 7 July 1868. From September 1868 to August 1871 he served in HMS Rattler and HMS Iron Duke, serving in the Far East, and later in HMS Caledonia in the Mediterranean During this period he also served in the Royal Yacht Victoria and Albert. Promoted to captain on 6 January 1875, from 15 April 1875 he commanded HMS Discovery for the British Arctic Expedition of 1875–6, led by George Strong Nares in HMS Alert, as a result he was appointed a Companion of the Order of the Bath (CB) (in the Civil Division) on 9 December 1876. He was appointed Equerry-in-waiting to the Prince of Wales (later Edward VII of the United Kingdom) on 5 July 1878 he held this post from time to time until 4 April 1893, when he was appointed an Extra Equerry. On 15 September 1880 he became captain of Carysfort. He participated in the recapture of Ismaïlia, and was awarded the 3rd Class Order of Osmanieh by the Khedive of Egypt in 1883. He was appointed Aide-de-camp to the Queen on 1 January 1888. He was additionally appointed CB in the military division on 23 May 1889.

== Later career ==
Vice Admiral Sir Henry Stephenson (second from left) Commander-in-Chief of the Channel Squadron with Staff on board HMS Majestic 1896

On 4 August 1890 Stephenson was promoted to rear admiral, serving as Commander-in-Chief of the Pacific Station from 4 May 1893 to 19 June 1896. He was promoted vice admiral on 10 October 1896, serving from 7 June 1897 to 20 December 1898 as Commander-in-Chief of the Channel Squadron. He was appointed a Knight Commander of the Order of the Bath (KCB) on 22 June 1897 in the 1897 Diamond Jubilee Honours, he flew his flag from HMS Majestic during the Spithead Naval Review marking the Jubilee on 26 June 1897. On the accession of Edward the VII, he became an Extra Naval Equerry, he was promoted admiral on 7 December 1901, and from 28 March 1902 to 1904 he was the First and Principal Naval Aide-de-Camp to King Edward VII. He retired on 16 September 1904 with the rank of admiral.

Stephenson was appointed Knight Grand Cross of the Royal Victorian Order (GCVO) in the November 1902 Birthday Honours list, and was invested with the insignia by the King at Buckingham Palace on 18 December 1902. On 24 July 1904 Stephenson was appointed Gentleman Usher of the Black Rod. In this capacity he served at a number of important state occasions, such as the State Opening of Parliament, the Coronation of George V, the investiture of the then Prince of Wales (later Edward VIII of the United Kingdom) as a Knight of the Garter in 1911. He was appointed an Extra Equerry to George V of the United Kingdom on 10 June 1910.

== Family ==
He married the Hon. Charlotte Elizabeth Eleanor Fraser on 5 December 1903. She died in 1923 and Stephenson died at home in London on 16 December 1919 aged 77.

== Arms ==
Coat of arms of Sir Henry Frederick Stephenson
Crest On a wreath of the colours, a falcon with wings expanded argent, beaked and legged or, within a herald's collar of SS proper. Escutcheon Vert, a chevron between in chief two roses, and in base a lion sejant guardant all argent, on a canton of the last, a canton azure, thereon the letter "A" or, within a ring of the last, jemmed proper. Motto Sola Virtus Invicta Symbolism The canton charged with the letter A within a gem ring is a supposed 'augmentation of honour' granted to Henry Frederick Stephenson was part of the mission to give the Garter to Tsar Alexander I of Russia, the crest is an allusions to his position as Falcon Herald Extraordinary.

Military offices
Preceded by Sir Charles Hotham	Commander-in-Chief, Pacific Station; 1893–1896	Succeeded by Henry Palliser
Preceded by Lord Walter Kerr	Senior Officer in Command, Channel Squadron; 1897–1898	Succeeded by Sir Harry Rawson
Honorary titles
Preceded by Sir Edward Seymour	First and Principal Naval Aide-de-Camp; 1903–1904	Succeeded by Sir John Fisher
Government offices
Preceded by Sir Michael Biddulph	Black Rod; 1904–1919	Succeeded by Sir William Pulteney
