= Henry Frederick Stephenson (MP) =

British politician (1790–1858)

- Born: 18 September 1790; London, England
- Died: 30 July 1858 (aged 67)
- Occupations: Politician, auditor, Officer of arms
- Spouse: Lady Mary Keppel
- Children: 10
- Parents: Charles Howard, 11th Duke of Norfolk (father); Elizabeth Stephenson (mother)
- Relatives: Sir Augustus Keppel Stephenson (son); Sir Henry Frederick Stephenson (son)

Henry Frederick Stephenson (18 September 1790 – 30 July 1858) was a British Whig politician and officer of arms. He was the illegitimate son of Charles Howard, 11th Duke of Norfolk.

He was appointed Falcon Herald Extraordinary and in 1815 was part of the mission to give the Garter to the Tsar Alexander I of Russia. On that occasion the emperor gave a gem ring to Stephenson, who was so pleased with this mark of favour that he was granted a supposed 'augmentation of honour' to his arms of a canton charged with the letter A within a gem ring.

He served as Member of Parliament for Westbury from 1831 to 1832. After leaving Parliament, he held a variety of minor offices.

He was the father of Sir Augustus Keppel Stephenson and of Admiral Sir Henry Frederick Stephenson.

== Arms ==
Coat of arms of Henry Frederick Stephenson
Crest On a wreath of the colours, a falcon with wings expanded argent, beaked and legged or, within a herald's collar of SS proper. Escutcheon Vert, a chevron between in chief two roses, and in base a lion sejant guardant all argent, on a canton of the last, a canton azure, thereon the letter "A" or, within a ring of the last, jemmed proper. Motto Sola Virtus Invicta Symbolism The crest is an allusions to his position as Falcon Herald Extraordinary.
