= Augustus Keppel Stephenson =

Sir Augustus Keppel Stephenson
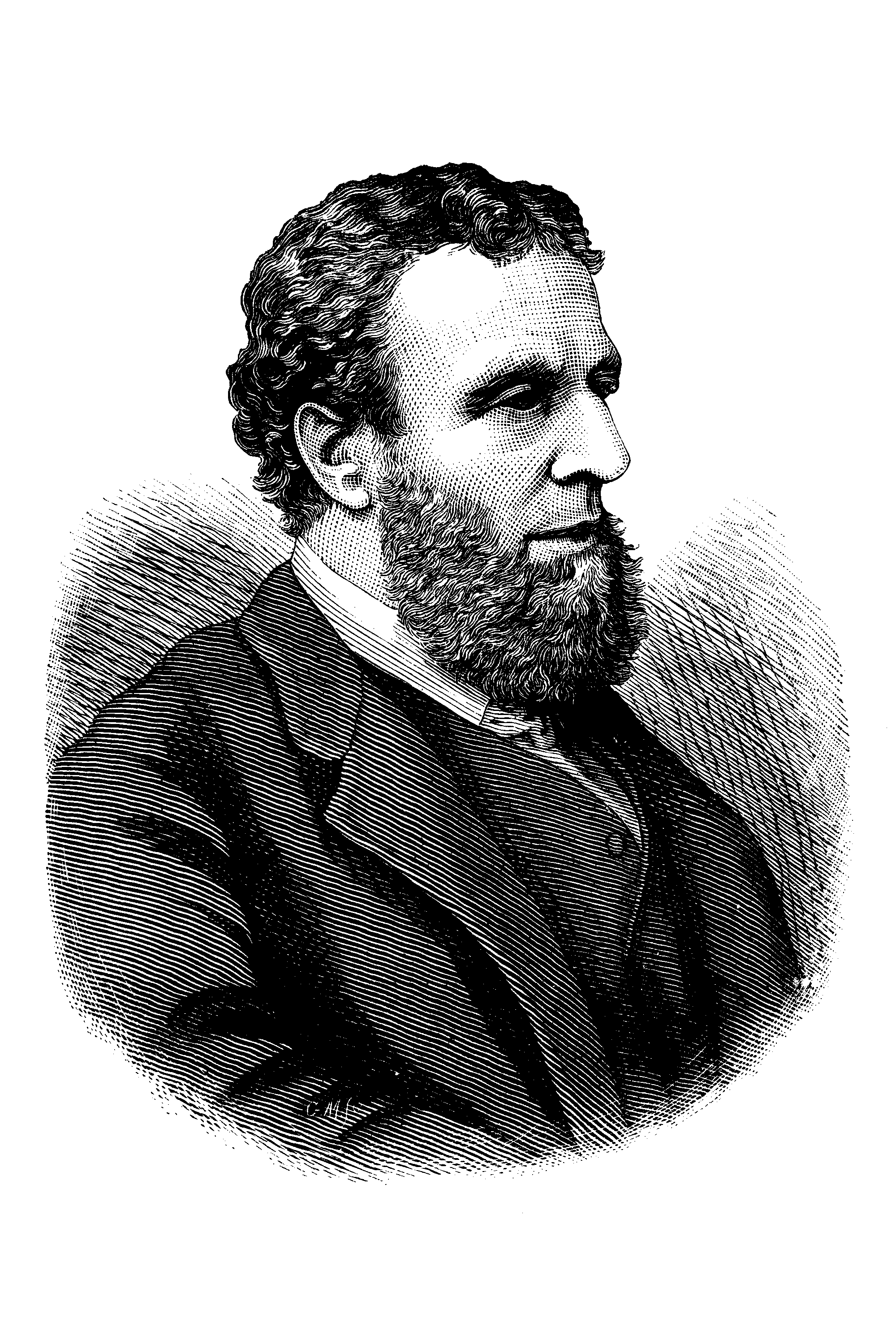
- Born: 18 October 1827; London
- Died: 26 September 1904 (aged 76)

Sir Augustus Frederick William Keppel Stephenson, KCB, KC (18 October 1827 in London – 26 September 1904) was a Treasury Solicitor and the second person to hold the office of Director of Public Prosecutions in England and Wales.

== Early life and family ==
Stephenson was born in London on 18 October 1827, the eldest child of Henry Frederick Stephenson, MP, and Lady Mary Keppel. His mother was one of eleven children born to William Keppel, 4th Earl of Albemarle. His father, Henry Frederick Stephenson, was the illegitimate son of Charles Howard, 11th Duke of Norfolk. Henry Frederick Stephenson was a barrister-at-law and served as M.P. for Westbury (1831–49).

His younger brother, Admiral Sir Henry Frederick Stephenson, was a Royal Navy officer, courtier and Arctic explorer.

== Education ==
Stephenson was educated privately, and later attended Caius College, Cambridge, taking his MA in 1819. He was called to the Bar as barrister-at-law of Lincoln's Inn in 1852.

== Career ==
For two years (1852–1854) he was Marshal and Associate in the Court of the Queen's Bench to the Lord Chief Justice. Stephenson then went to the Norfolk Circuit and was appointed a Revising Barrister and a Recorder of Bedford. He was appointed Assistant Solicitor of the Treasury by Lord Russell in 1865. The Chancellor of the Exchequer, Mr. Lowe, made him interim Registrar of Friendly Societies that same year.

In 1876 Stephenson was appointed Solicitor to the Treasury. The following year, the First Lord of the Treasury appointed him to serve as Her Majesty's Procurator General.

Stephenson was created a CB on the recommendation of Mr. Gladstone in 1883, and a KCB, in 1886. He was made Director of Public Prosecutions in 1884.

In 1889, he was made Queen's Counsel on the recommendation of Lord Chancellor Halsbury.

== Marriage ==
Stephenson married Eglantine Pleydell-Bouverie, second daughter of Rt. Hon. Edward Pleydell-Bouverie and Elizabeth Anne Balfour, on 5 December 1864. Their children included Guy Stephenson.

== Cleveland street scandal ==
One notable case occurred in 1889 when Stephenson was given the Cleveland Street scandal to prosecute. It involved various members of the aristocracy (such as Lord Arthur Somerset and the Earl of Euston), but these people were "allowed" (in the words of the radical journal the North London Press) to escape prosecution, something which attracted Stephenson a lot of criticism from the press.

== Arms ==
Coat of arms of Sir Henry Frederick Stephenson
Crest On a wreath of the colours, a falcon with wings expanded argent, beaked and legged or, within a herald's collar of SS proper. Escutcheon Vert, a chevron between in chief two roses, and in base a lion sejant guardant all argent, on a canton of the last, a canton azure, thereon the letter "A" or, within a ring of the last, jemmed proper. Motto Sola Virtus Invicta Symbolism The canton charged with the letter A within a gem ring is a supposed 'augmentation of honour' granted to Henry Frederick Stephenson was part of the mission to give the Garter to Tsar Alexander I of Russia, the crest is an allusions to his position as Falcon Herald Extraordinary.

Legal offices
Preceded by John Gray	Treasury Solicitor; 1875–1894	Succeeded by Hamilton Cuffe
Preceded by Francis Hart Dyke	HM Procurator General (Queen's Proctor); 1876–1894	Succeeded by Hamilton Cuffe
Preceded by Sir John Maule	Director of Public Prosecutions; 1884–1894	Succeeded by Hamilton Cuffe
