= 671 =

Calendar year

671 in various calendars
| Gregorian calendar | 671; DCLXXI |
| Ab urbe condita | 1424 |
| Armenian calendar | 120; ԹՎ ՃԻ |
| Assyrian calendar | 5421 |
| Balinese saka calendar | 592–593 |
| Bengali calendar | 77–78 |
| Berber calendar | 1621 |
| Buddhist calendar | 1215 |
| Burmese calendar | 33 |
| Byzantine calendar | 6179–6180 |
| Chinese calendar | 庚午年 (Metal Horse); 3368 or 3161 — to — 辛未年 (Metal Goat); 3369 or 3162 |
| Coptic calendar | 387–388 |
| Discordian calendar | 1837 |
| Ethiopian calendar | 663–664 |
| Hebrew calendar | 4431–4432 |
- Hindu calendars
| Vikram Samvat | 727–728 |
| Shaka Samvat | 592–593 |
| Kali Yuga | 3771–3772 |
| Holocene calendar | 10671 |
| Iranian calendar | 49–50 |
| Islamic calendar | 50–51 |
| Japanese calendar | Hakuchi 22 (白雉２２年) |
| Javanese calendar | 562–563 |
| Julian calendar | 671; DCLXXI |
| Korean calendar | 3004 |
| Minguo calendar | 1241 before ROC 民前1241年 |
| Nanakshahi calendar | −797 |
| Seleucid era | 982/983 AG |
| Thai solar calendar | 1213–1214 |
| Tibetan calendar | ལྕགས་ཕོ་རྟ་ལོ་ (male Iron-Horse); 797 or 416 or −356 — to — ལྕགས་མོ་ལུག་ལོ་ (female Iron-Sheep); 798 or 417 or −355 |

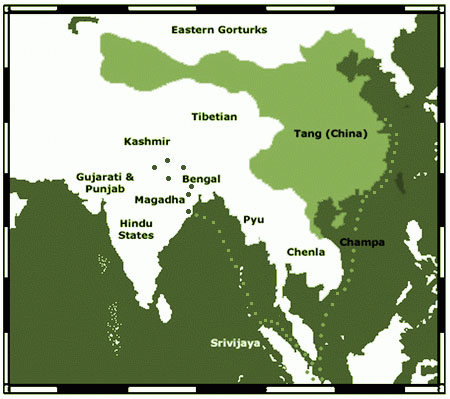
Travel map of Yijing (7th century)

Year 671 (DCLXXI) was a common year starting on Wednesday of the Julian calendar. The denomination 671 for this year has been used since the early medieval period, when the Anno Domini calendar era became the prevalent method in Europe for naming years.

== Events ==
- December 7 – An annular solar eclipse is visible from Tibet to the Maghreb.

=== By place ===
==== Europe ====
- Perctarit returns to Lombardy from exile and reclaims his realm, which is being ruled on behalf of Garibald, since his father King Grimoald I died. He deposes the young king, and becomes the new ruler of the Lombard Kingdom in Italy. During his reign Perctarit makes Catholicism the official religion, but does not recognize papal authority. Grimoald is buried in the St. Ambrogio Church (Milan).

==== Britain ====
- Battle of Two Rivers: King Ecgfrith of Northumbria defeats the Picts under King Drest VI, in the vicinity of Moncreiffe Island, near Perth (Scotland). After the battle the Picts are reduced to slavery, and subject to the yoke of captivity for the next 14 years.

==== Asia ====
- Yijing, Chinese Buddhist monk, travels by boat from Guangzhou, and visits the capital of the partly Buddhist kingdom of Srivijaya in Palembang (Indonesia). He stays for 6 months to study Sanskrit grammar and the Malay language.
- June 10 – Emperor Tenji introduces a water clock (clepsydra) called Rokoku. The instrument, which measures time and indicates hours, is placed in the capital of Ōtsu in Japan.
- Silla seizes control of the former Baekje capital of Sabi from the Tang Protectorate General to Pacify the East.

== Births ==
- Sigebert IV, Frankish prince (approximate date)

== Deaths ==
- Grimoald I, king of the Lombards
