= Battle of Luith Feirn =

664 battle

The Battle of Luith Feirn took place within the Pictish kingdom of Fortriu in 664. It is recorded in the Annals of Ulster as "Bellum Lutho Feirnn, .i. iFortrinn." meaning "The Battle of Luith Feirnn, i.e. in Fortriu.". This is the first explicit mention of Fortriu in contemporary Irish chronicles, though the cognate Verturiones had been mentioned by the Roman writer Ammianus Marcellinus in the late 4th century as one of the Pictish peoples participating in the Great Conspiracy of 367–368.

The participants in the battle are unrecorded, but it may be connected to the accession of the king of Fortriu Drest son of Donuel, after the death of his brother Gartnait son of Donuel in 663.

The location of Luith Feirn, meaning "alder-gate", is not known for certain; but places called Leitirfearn and Leitir Fearna, meaning "alder-hillside" exist on the south side of Loch Oich in the Great Glen, so it's possible that the battle site was nearby.

== Bibliography ==
- Fraser, James E. (2009). From Caledonia to Pictland: Scotland to 795. New Edinburgh History of Scotland. Edinburgh: Edinburgh University Press. ISBN 9780748612321.
- Noble, Gordon; Evans, Nicholas (2022). The Picts: Scourge of Rome, Rulers of the North. Edinburgh: Birlinn. ISBN 9781780277783.
- Woolf, Alex (2006). "Dun Nechtain, Fortriu and the Geography of the Picts". Scottish Historical Review. 85 (220): 182–201. doi:10.1353/shr.2007.0029.
