= Drest son of Donuel =

King of the Picts from 663 to 672

King of the Picts
- Reign: 663–672
- Predecessor: Gartnait son of Donuel
- Successor: Bridei son of Beli
- Died: 677
- Father: Donuel

Drest son of Donuel (Old Irish: Drust mac Domnaill or Drust mac Dúngail; died 677) was king of the Picts from c. 663 until 672. Like his brother and predecessor Gartnait son of Donuel (Gartnait IV), and Gartnait's predecessor Talorgan son of Eanfrith (Talorgan I), he may have reigned under the overlordship of the Northumbrian king Oswiu. Gartnait and Drest may have been sons of Domnall Brecc, who was king of Dál Riata from c. 629 until he was killed in 642.

The length of Drest's reign is uncertain: the Pictish Chronicle give him a reign of six or seven (67) years, while contemporary Irish annals imply a reign of eight or nine years. His accession to the kingship may be connected to the Battle of Luith Feirn recorded in the Annals of Ulster as taking place in 664, or Oswiu may have forced an interregnum on the kingdom from 663–666, after the death of Drest's brother Gartnait in 663. Drest may have been king of the northern Pictish kingdom of Fortriu.

Drest was expelled from his kingdom in 671, an event seen as related to the failed Pictish attack on Northumbria that culminated in crushing defeat at the hands of Ecgfrith of Northumbria at the Battle of Two Rivers. Stephen of Ripon records in his Vita Sancti Wilfrithi (Life of St Wilfrid) that the Picts had "gathered together innumerable nations (gentes) from every nook and corner in the north", suggesting that Drest had joined forces with other territories which were otherwise not politically united. Drest's successor was a cousin of Ecgfrith Bridei son of Beli, who would eventually defeat and kill Ecgfrith and overthrow the Northumbrian hegemony at the Battle of Dun Nechtain in 685.

After his expulsion Drest continued to receive attention from Irish annals, suggesting that he remained in the orbit of the Abbey of Iona, until his death in 677.

== Sources ==
- The Annals of Ulster, CELT: Corpus of Electronic Texts
- The Annals of Tigernach, CELT: Corpus of Electronic Texts
- Anderson, Alan Orr; Early Sources of Scottish History A.D. 500–1286, volume 1. Reprinted with corrections, Paul Watkins, Stamford, 1990. ISBN 1-871615-03-8
- Colgrave, Bertram (1927), The Life of Bishop Wilfrid by Eddius Stephanus, Cambridge: Cambridge University Press, ISBN 978-0-521-31387-2
- Fraser, James E. (2006). The Pictish Conquest - The Battle of Dunnichen 685 and the birth of Scotland. Stroud: Tempus Publishing. ISBN 9780752439624.
- Fraser, James E. (2009), From Caledonia to Pictland: Scotland to 795, Edinburgh: Edinburgh University Press, ISBN 978-0-7486-1232-1
- Cummins, W.A. (2009), The Age of the Picts, Stroud: The History Press, ISBN 978-0-7524-4959-3
- Smyth, Alfred P. (1989). Warlords and Holy Men: Scotland, A.D. 80–1000. New History of Scotland. Edinburgh: Edinburgh University Press. ISBN 9780748601004.
- Williams, Ann; Smyth, Alfred P.; Kirby, D.P. (1991). A Biographical Dictionary of Dark Age Britain: England, Scotland and Wales c. 500–1050. London: B. A. Seaby. ISBN 9781852640477.

Regnal titles
| Preceded by Gartnait IV | King of the Picts; 663–672 | Succeeded by Bridei III |
