= Eormenburg =

Anglo-Saxon queen of Northumbria

- Queen of Northumbria
- Spouse: Ecgfrith of Northumbria

Eormenburg or Iurminburg (fl. 672–685) was an Anglo-Saxon queen of Northumbria as consort to Ecgfrith of Northumbria. She later became an abbess.

== Biography ==
Eormenburg's parentage is unknown.

She was the second wife of Ecgfrith of Northumbria, who was King of Deira (a sub-kingdom of Northumbria, 664 to 670) then King of Northumbria (670 to 685). They married after the dissolution of his unconsummated marriage to Æthelthryth, daughter of Anna of East Anglia and Sæwara. Æthelthryth chose instead to become a consecrated virgin and later founded Ely Abbey on the Isle of Ely. Ecgfrith wedding Eormenburg was valid in church law.

As queen, Eormenburg was active in politics. The chronicler Eddius Stephanus considered that the king was overly influenced by his wife.

She became an enemy of Wilfrid, Bishop of York and suggested to her husband that the bishops estates, large retinue and pomp and ceremony was a threat to royal dignity. In 678, Wilfred lost his see by the division of the archdiocese by Theodore of Canterbury. He was expelled from the kingdom of Northumbria by Ecgrith, an action which was allegedly incited by the queen.

According to Stephanus' 8th-century biography the Life of Wilfrid, Eormenburg's sister was married to Centwine of Wessex. Ecgfrith's sister was married to Aethelred of Mercia. Due to the familial connections between the royal houses of Northumbria, Mercia and Wessex, and Eormenburg's influence through this "royal ladies network", Wilfred was persecuted in all three kingdoms. He fled to Rome and appealed against Theodore and Ecgfrith's decisions to Pope Agatho. In 680, Wilfrid returned to Northumbria with a papal decree ordering his restoration, but was instead imprisoned and then exiled by the king and queen.

Whilst Eormenburg and her husband were staying at Coldingham Priory, Scotland, she fell ill and suffered from "convulsive fits." The fits were considered the consequence of her hostility towards Wilfred, her stealing a reliquary from him that she wore as a necklace and her "exulting in these spoils". The abbess Æbbe of Coldingham advised the king that Eormenburg would only be cured when the reliquary was returned and he was restored. The king took her advice, returned the relics and Wilfred was released from his exile. Eormenburg miraculously recovered.

Ecgfrith died whilst fighting against the Picts of Fortriu at the Battle of Dun Nechtain on 20 May 685. Eormenburg was residing at a nunnery in Carlisle while her husband was away on the campaign. St. Cuthbert was also visiting the nunnery and warned Eormenburg that he had a vision of her husband being killed in battle. News soon arrived from the battlefield confirming Ecgfrith's death. As Ecgfrith and Eormenburg had no children, the Northumbrian throne was inherited by Ecgfrith's illegitimate half-brother Aldfrith of Northumbria.

After learning of the death of her husband, Eormenburg took the veil and was consecrated as a nun. She later rose to become abbess of her foundation and Stephanus recorded that she led a praiseworthy monastic life.

Her date of death is unknown.
