= Judith Langlands-Scott =

Scottish historian

Judith Langlands-Scott FSAScot
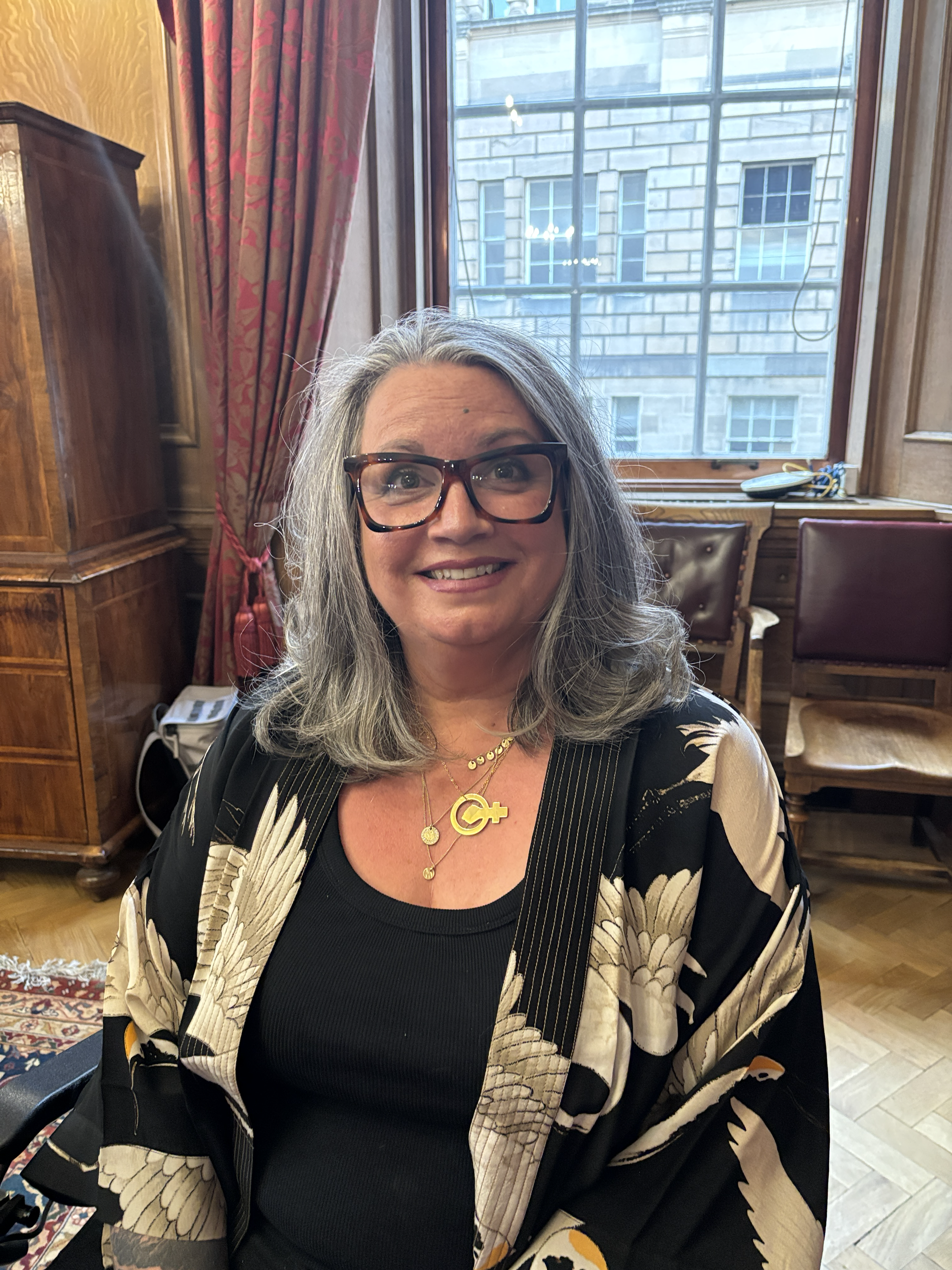
- Occupation: Historian

Judith Langlands-Scott is a historian from Forfar in Scotland specialising in the 17th and 18th century Scottish witch hunts.

== Career ==
Langlands-Scott is a Fellow of the Society of Antiquaries of Scotland. She works with research partner, Shaun Wilson, as Forfar’s Witch Trial historians, and the pair work closely with the Meffan Institute to host talks on the Forfar Witch Trials.

Langlands-Scott has been a longstanding campaigner and spoken out in support of Scotland acknowledging the women killed as accused witches:

“People are still haunted by what happened. King James was obsessed with the bible and believed he was God's representative – and he was obsessed with the idea that the witches were multiplying. Historians widely agree that following the death of his mother [Mary, Queen of Scots] he was brought up to think that women were feeble and easily manipulated because of their carnal desires.”

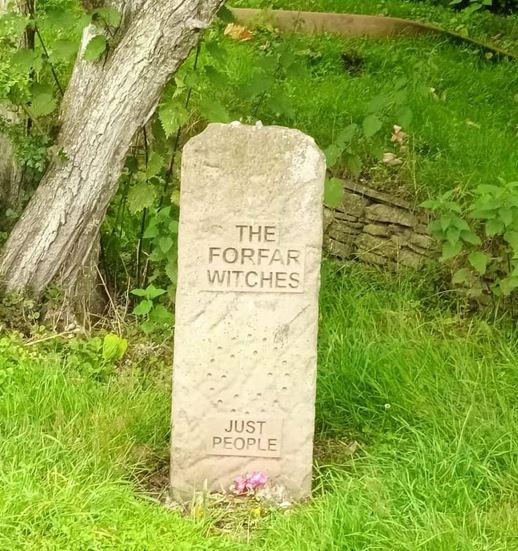
2010 witch memorial in Forfar

Langands-Scott and Wilson organised a memorial service in 2022 for people persecuted as witches in 17th-century Scotland. In November 2023, Langlands-Scott unveiled a plaque commemorating the women in Forfar wrongly convicted of witchcraft. More than 50 women were falsely accused in the Angus town in the 1600s and many of them were killed. The plaque was created by artists, Kayleigh Skye Esplin and Andrew Rose. Esplin explained the motivation behind the plaque's creation:

"For the plaque we decided to zone and be a bit more positive. To celebrate the life the ‘witches’ had and how it was just people, rather than all the brutality and victimisation that was put on them."

Langlands-Scott has campaigned for the Scottish Parliament to pardon those historically convicted as witches.

== Publications ==
- Jindal-Snape, Divya; Keiller, Andrew; Kelly, Lynn; Langlands-Scott, Judith; Murray, Christopher; Snape, Anj; Snape, Jonathan B.; Snape, Nik; Warden, Freddie; Whittingham, Bryan (November 2017). Fibromyalgia and us: Living with fibromyalgia. University of Dundee.
