= Craichie =

Hamlet in Dunnichen, Angus, Scotland

Coordinates: 56.614920°N 2.811386°W

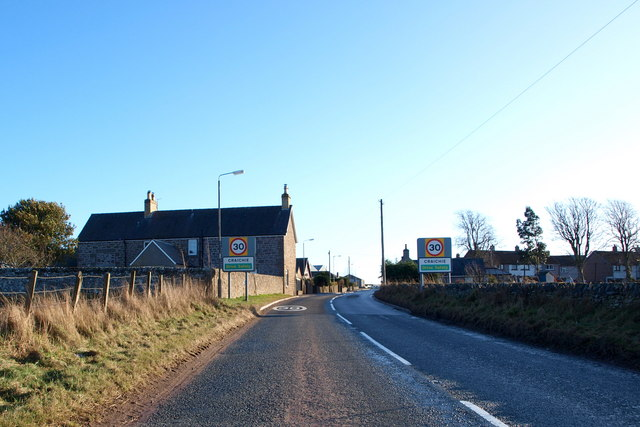
- Craichie from the west

- Location within Angus
- OS grid reference: NO503473
- Council area: Angus
- Lieutenancy area: Angus
- Country: Scotland
- Sovereign state: United Kingdom
- Post town: FORFAR
- Postcode district: DD8
- Dialling code: 01307
- Police: Scotland
- Fire: Scottish
- Ambulance: Scottish
- UK Parliament: Angus
- Scottish Parliament: North Tayside

Craichie (Scots pronunciation: [ˈkɾeːxe]) is a hamlet in the parish of Dunnichen, Angus, Scotland. Craichie is three miles south-east of Forfar and two miles south-west of Letham, at a junction on the B9128 Carnoustie to Forfar road.

== History ==
The hamlet was mentioned in 1329 as Craquhy in the Registers of the Abbey of Arbroath. The Registers recorded that they were owned by Walter de Tulloch in 1438, and Alexander of Sturrock in 1509. It had a primary school from 1900 until the 1980s which served the hamlet as well as the surrounding area. It is now served by Letham Primary School. Craichie has expanded through new houses built in the late 20th century and in 2003–4.
