= Dunnichen Stone =

The Dunnichen Stone
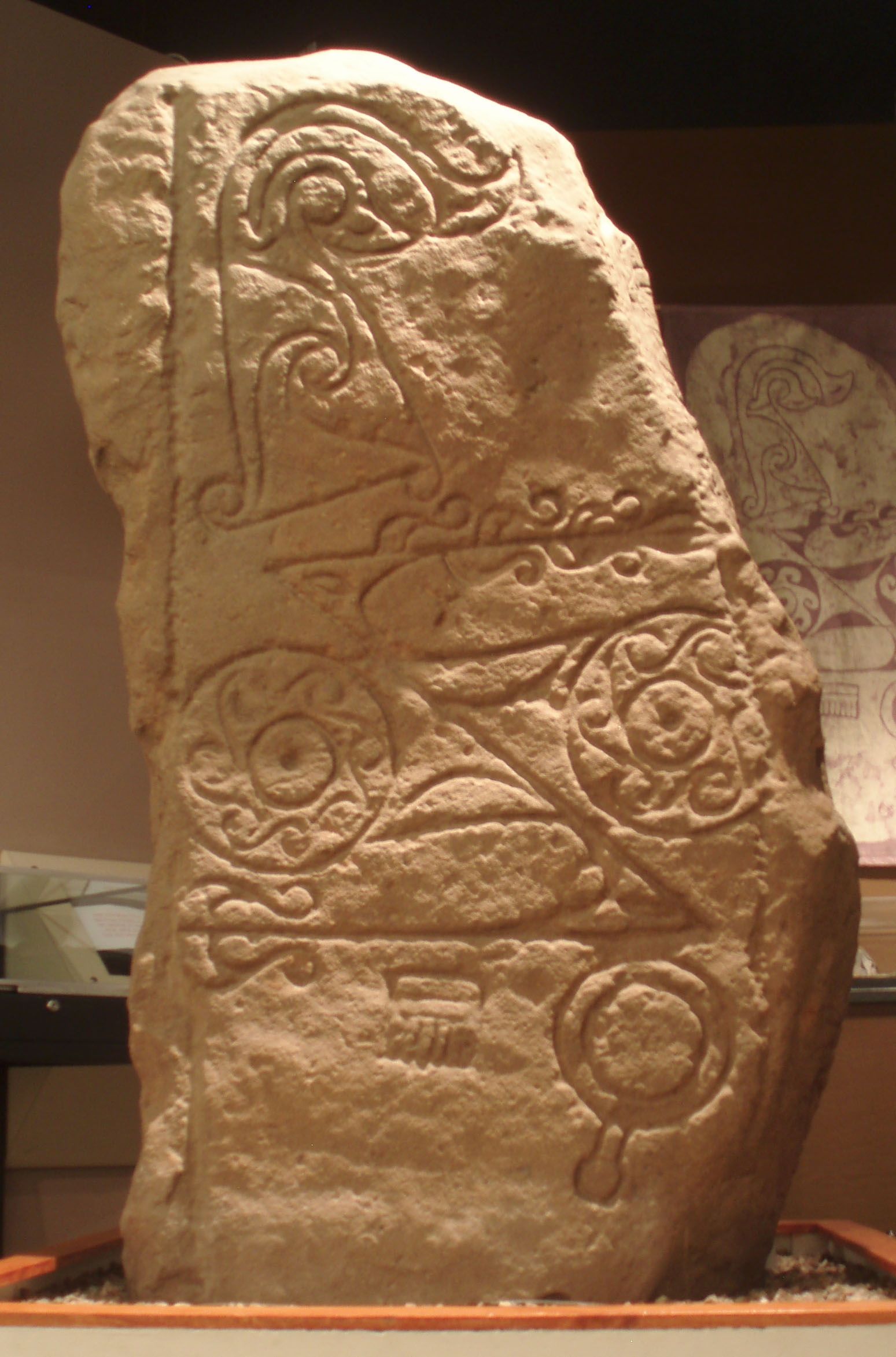
- The Dunnichen Stone
- Material: Old Red Sandstone
- Height: 1.5 metres (4.9 ft)
- Symbols: flower; double disc and z rod; mirror and comb
- Created: Seventh Century CE
- Discovered: 1811
- Place: near Dunnichen, Angus, Scotland
- Present location: Meffan Institute, Forfar, Angus, Scotland
- Coordinates: 56.6441°N 2.8891°W
- Classification: Type I
- Culture: Picto-Scottish

The Dunnichen Stone is a class I Pictish symbol stone that was discovered in 1811 at Dunnichen, Angus. It probably dates to the 7th century AD.

== Location ==
The exact location at which the stone was found is unknown, but thought to be in a field in the East Mains of Dunnichen, on the SE slope of Dunnichen Hill, (grid reference NO51654960), overlooking Dunnichen Moss. It is currently on display at the Meffan Institute in Forfar (grid reference NO455506).

== History ==
Andrew Jervise relates the stone was found in a field called the Chashel or Castle Park, and that the site later became a quarry. While this name is no longer extant, James Headrick records it was in East Mains of Dunnichen, and the location was later assigned in 1966 at a disused quarry on that farm.

The discovery was described by Headrick:

... a good many years ago, there was turned up with the plough a large flat stone, on which is cut a rude outline of an armed warrior's head and shoulders

Jervise, noting the inaccuracy of description, identifies this confidently with the extant Dunnichen Stone.

The stone was initially erected at the unidentified "Kirkton Church", either in Dunnichen or in Letham, then it was moved to the garden of Dunnichen House. It was relocated to St Vigeans Museum in 1967, then to Dundee Museum (now the McManus Galleries) in 1972. It is currently on long-term loan to the Meffan Institute in Forfar.

A fibreglass replica stands at the Church in Dunnichen.

== Description ==
The stone is of rough sandstone, 1.5 meters (4 foot 8 inches) high, 0.7 meters (2 foot 3 inches) wide and 0.3 meters (1 foot) thick. It is incised on one face with three symbols: a pictish flower; a double disc and Z-rod; and a mirror and comb. While the double disc and Z-rod and mirror and comb motifs are fairly common and exist together elsewhere (see for example the Aberlemno Serpent Stone) the Flower is relatively rare.
