= Dunachton =

Coordinates: 57.118044°N 3.950359°W

Dunachton: Scottish Gaelic: Dùn Neachdain
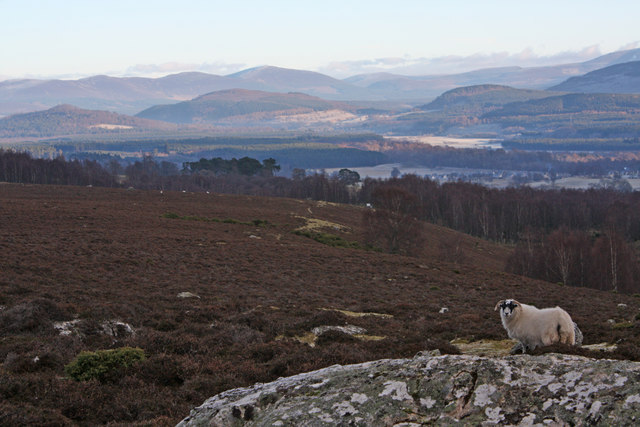
- Dunachton Moor

- Location within the Badenoch and Strathspey area
- OS grid reference: NH820047
  - Edinburgh: 86 mi (138 km) SSE
  - London: 417 mi (671 km) SSE
- Council area: Highland
- Lieutenancy area: Inverness (lieutenancy)
- Country: Scotland
- Sovereign state: United Kingdom
- Post town: KINGUSSIE
- Postcode district: PH21
- Dialling code: 01540
- Police: Scotland
- Fire: Scottish
- Ambulance: Scottish
- UK Parliament: Moray West, Nairn and Strathspey
- Scottish Parliament: Inverness East, Nairn and Lochaber; Highlands and Islands

Dunachton (Scottish Gaelic: Dùn Neachdain) is an estate on the north-west shore of Loch Insh in Badenoch and Strathspey, in the Highlands of Scotland. It occupies land immediately to the north of the A9 road and General Wade's Military Road.

Recent research has suggested Dunachton as a potential location for the Battle of Dun Nechtain in 685 in which the Picts permanently secured independence from the Northumbrians.

== History ==
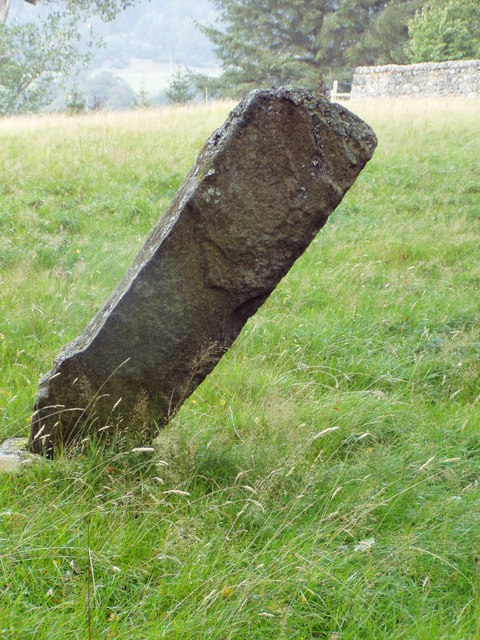
The Dunachton Stone. Class I Pictish stone

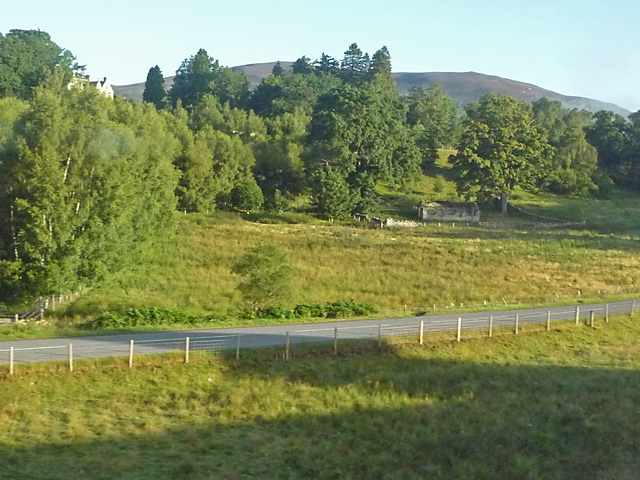
St Drostán's Chapel, Dunachton

The area around Dunachton shows evidence of human occupation in prehistory, with flintwork and whetstones being found in the vicinity.

The name Dunachton derives from Dun Neachdain the fort of Nechtan. Nechtan's identity is unknown, but it is likely he was one of several of the early Pictish Kings that went by that name.

Dunachton had some importance in the Early Medieval period. It is the site of an early class I Pictish stone which was discovered in 1870, having been recycled as a lintel stone in a farmstead building. This stone, with an incised deer head and dating from about the 7th century, was re-erected in the near-by field. In 2010 the Dutch archaeologist Lex Ritman informed the resident of Dunachton Lodge that the stone was fallen. So the Pictish stone was re-instated in the walled garden of the estate and was now well protected. Dunachton is first documented as 'Dwnachtan' in 1381, in reference to the 'capelle de Nachtan', the Chapel of Nechtan, which was dedicated to St Drostan.

Recent research has pointed to the possibility that Dunachton may have been the correct site of the Battle of Dun Nechtain in 685, when Bridei mac Bille, king of the Pictish kingdom of Fortriu defeated Ecgfrith of Northumbria, securing Pictish independence from Northumbria. The battle site was previously thought to be somewhere in the vicinity of Dunnichen in Angus, but reappraisal of the scant documentary evidence along with the reappraisal of Fortriu as being north of the Grampian Mountains has led to the suggestion that Dunachton is the true location.

Dunachton Lodge was built on the remains of Dunachton Castle. The landowners were originally the MacNivens, who as a sept of the MacNaughtons, claim descent from Nechtan. The barony subsequently came into possession of the Clan Mackintosh in the early 16th century through the marriage of Isabel MacNiven, the heiress of the Barony of Dunachton to William Mackintosh, cousin of the chief of the clan Mackintosh, and later chief of Clan Mackintosh and the wider Chattan Confederation.

A centuries-old feud between the Mackintoshes and Clan MacDonald of Keppoch came to a head in 1688 at the Battle of Maol Ruadh. Dunachton Castle was destroyed the following year by Coll MacDonald under the auspices of the Jacobite cause, provoking a public rebuke from Dundee. It was never rebuilt.

Dunachton was bought in the 1950s by Andrew Forbes-Leith, who later inherited the baronetcy of Fyvie. In the 1970s he turned 600 acres (2.4 km^{2}) of Dunachton into the Highland Wildlife Park.
