= Bowriefauld =

Coordinates: 56.62°N 02.80°W

Bowriefauld: Scots: Bowriefaud
- Location within Angus
- OS grid reference: NO5148
- Council area: Angus
- Lieutenancy area: Angus
- Country: Scotland
- Sovereign state: United Kingdom
- Police: Scotland
- Fire: Scottish
- Ambulance: Scottish
- UK Parliament: Angus
- Scottish Parliament: Angus South

Bowriefauld (Scots pronunciation: [ˈbʌureˌfɑːd]) is a small village in Angus, Scotland. To the north of Bowriefauld is Dunnichen and to the east is Letham.

The village has several old cottages.

Dunnichen cemetery is on the northern edge of the village.
