= Letham, Angus =

Coordinates: 56.628654°N 2.77093°W

Letham
- Location within Angus
- Population: 1,640 (2020)
- Demonym: Lethamite
- OS grid reference: NO528488
- Council area: Angus
- Lieutenancy area: Angus
- Country: Scotland
- Sovereign state: United Kingdom
- Post town: FORFAR
- Postcode district: DD8
- Dialling code: 01307
- Police: Scotland
- Fire: Scottish
- Ambulance: Scottish
- UK Parliament: Angus
- Scottish Parliament: Angus South

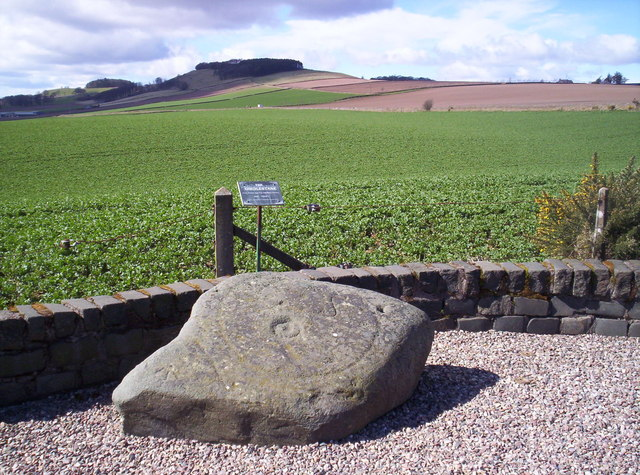
The Girdlestane, on the northern edge of Letham, a cup and ring mark monument, looking towards Dunnichen Hill

Letham (Scots pronunciation: [ˈlɛθəm]) is a village in Angus, Scotland.

Letham is the largest village in Angus, with a population of nearly 2,000. Situated 17 miles (27 km) from Dundee, 5 miles (8.0 km) from Forfar, 10 miles (16 km) from Arbroath and 10 miles (16 km) from Carnoustie.

There are some shops, including two groceries, one of which incorporates the Post Office and newsagent, a primary school, a bakery, a hairdresser, a take-away restaurant, a former hotel which now only functions as bar, the Commercial Inn and a co-operative craft shop named Hand Pict. The village is part of the parish of Letham, Dunnichen and Kirkden.

In and around the village is an extensive pattern of green paths which are kept cut by a group of volunteers, giving the village many and varied places to walk. Many organisations and groups exist to enhance village life, the oldest of these being the Feuars Committee, which manages properties, held in trust for the people of the village.

Nearby is the village of Dunnichen, which is widely believed to be the site of the Battle of Nechtansmere, and the Hamlets of Bowriefauld and Craichie. To the north of the village there is a Pictish stone with a cup and ring marking, locally known as the Girdlestane. Pictish stones have been found in many sites in Angus.

Letham is twinned with Monasterboice, County Louth, Ireland.
