= Æbbe of Coldingham =

Anglian abbess and saint (c. 615–683)

Saint Æbbe the Elder

Abbess
- Born: c. 615; Northumbria
- Died: 683 (aged 67–68); Coldingham, Scotland
- Venerated in: Catholic Church; Church of England; Eastern Orthodox Church
- Canonized: Pre-Congregation
- Feast: 25 August

Æbbe, also called Tabbs, (c. 615 – 683) was an Orthodox Abess and noblewoman. She was the daughter of Æthelfrith, king of Bernicia from c. 593 to 616. She founded monasteries at Ebchester and St Abb's Head near Coldingham in Scotland.

== Life ==
=== Early life ===
Æbbe was the daughter of King Æthelfrith of Bernicia and Acha of Deira. Her brothers were Oswald of Northumbria and Oswiu.

Æthelfrith invaded the neighbouring kingdom of Deira in 604, and deposed the heir, Acha's brother Edwin, who fled into exile. Æthelfrith was the first Bernician king to also rule Deira, giving him an important place in the history of the later Kingdom of Northumbria.

Edwin took refuge in the court of King Rædwald of East Anglia, and with his support in 616, raised an army against Æthelfrith. Edwin's forces defeated and killed Æthelfrith, and Edwin gained the throne of Bernicia and Deira. The kingdom was no longer safe for Æthelfrith's children, as they presented potential rival claims to Edwin's rule. Æbbe fled north with her mother and brothers to exile in the court of Eochaid Buide of Dál Riata. It was during this time of exile in western Scotland that she and her brothers were converted to Christianity.

=== Life as Abbess ===
While the sons of Æthelfrith always represented a threat to Edwin, he was finally deposed by an alliance of the Mercian King Penda and the Welsh king Cadwallon. They raised an army against Edwin and killed him in battle in 633. Eanfrith, eldest son of Æthelfrith, and Æbbe's half-brother, returned as King of Bernicia, however the alliance proved short-lived and he was later killed by Cadwallon. The year following, Æthelfrith's son Oswald returned and drove the invaders from both Bernicia and Deira, thus establishing himself on the throne of Northumbria. He was however defeated and killed in battle in 642 by Penda, and was succeeded as king by his brother Oswiu.

With her brothers on the throne of Northumbria, Æbbe could return from exile and with their support established a monastery at Ebchester and later within the remains of a 6th-century fort at urbs Coludi, now known as Kirk Hill at St Abb's Head, latterly evolving into Coldingham Priory. This religious house lasted for about 40 years and was a double separate monastery of both monks and nuns governed by Æbbe. Legend says she became a nun to avoid the attentions of a certain Prince Aidan. However, he refused to give up his suit and it is said that due to her prayers the tide stayed high around Kirk Hill for three days and protected her. Æbbe was instrumental in the spread of Christianity to the still largely pagan Angles on the Northumbrian coast.

Her political prowess also proved important in rectifying a dispute between her nephew Ecgfrith, King of Northumbria, who had succeeded his father Oswui in 670, and the Bishop Wilfrid. Ecgfrith of Northumbria was the son of Æbbe's brother Oswiu, who arranged a marriage between the then fifteen year old Ecgfrith and Æthelthryth, daughter of King Anna of East Anglia. The dispute started with Wilfrid's support for Queen Æthelthryth, who wished despite her marriage to preserve her virginity, and to enter a monastery. With his support she had become a nun at Æbbes monastery. Æbbe educated the ex-queen Æthelthryth, first wife of Ecgfrith, who later after graduating from Æbbe's tutelage established a religious site on which now stands Ely Cathedral.

The ill feeling in court against Wilfrid continued with Ecgfrith's second wife, Iurmenburh, who became hostile to Wilfrid on account of the vast estates which he had acquired and the way he travelled about with a large armed retinue, like that of a king. This culminated in Wilfrid being imprisoned at Dunbar at Ecgfrith's whim. Thanks to Æbbe's political skills, on a visit by Ecgfrith to the monastery on Kirk hill, she managed to persuade her nephew to release the bishop.

Many double monasteries were often inhabited by the younger offspring of noble families, and would have been a place for eating, drinking and entertainment. While Æbbe, herself was noted for her own piety, she had trouble enforcing discipline at the monastery. The monks and nuns thus became very lax and worldly. This leads to one of the most famous miracles surrounding the patron saint of southeast Scotland and northeast England, St. Cuthbert who visited Æbbe's monastery to instruct the community. At night Cuthbert would disappear to bathe and pray in the sea, to stop himself succumbing to temptations of the flesh. Very early one morning, a monk from the monastery spied him praying and singing psalms in the sea and as Cuthbert came ashore, he saw or imagined he saw two otters bound out of the sea and join Cuthbert. They licked his ice cold feet until they were warm again, and dried them with their fur. The most likely location for this event is Horse Castle bay at the base of the Kirk Hill.

=== Death ===
Shortly after the death of Æbbe, and as foretold in prophecy by a monk named Adamnan, in 683 the monastery burned down. The monastic site was abandoned, and by the first half of the 8th century, as Bede confirms, the site was deserted. The early work of Æbbe in establishing the Christian religion in south-east Scotland was not forgotten, and in a book written about c. 1200 by the monks of Coldingham, they tell of many pilgrims visiting the Kirk Hill and the spring at Well Mouth, located at the top of the beach now called Horse Castle Bay. St. Æbbe's feast day is celebrated on August 25.

== Archeology ==
The remains of a possible monastery at Coldingham was discovered near Coldingham Priory (a historical house for Benedictine monks), according to the announcement on 8 March 2019 by DigVentures, a U.K.-based group led by archaeologists and supported by crowdfunding.

== See also ==
- Coldingham Priory

== Sources ==
- Bede. History of the English Church and People.
- Bede. Life of Cuthbert.
- Eddius. Life of Wilfrid.
- https://www.bbc.com/news/uk-scotland-south-scotland-47495826
