= Talorgan son of Eanfrith =

King of the Picts from 653 to 657

King of the Picts
- Reign: 653–657
- Predecessor: Talorc III
- Successor: Gartnait IV
- Died: 657
- Father: Eanfrith of Bernicia
- Mother: Pictish princess

Talorgan son of Eanfrith (Old Irish: Talorcan mac Enfret; died 657) was a King of the Picts from 653 to 657. As with his successors Gartnait son of Donuel and Drest son of Donuel, he reigned as a puppet king under the Northumbrian king Oswiu.

Talorgan was the son of Eanfrith of Bernicia, who had fled into exile among the Picts after his father, the Bernician king Æthelfrith, was killed around the year 616. Talorgan's mother is likely to have been a member of a powerful Pictish royal dynasty, and may have been the sister of his predecessor Talorg son of Uuid, as "Talorgan" is a diminutive meaning "Little Talorg". Talorgan may have claimed Pictish kingship through his mother, but his rule may also have been because he was the nephew of Oswiu at a time Oswiu was ruling Northumbria. Talorgan was probably imposed upon the southern Picts by Oswiu, as part of his policy of expansion and domination in northern Britain.

Talorgan became king in 653, probably with a powerbase within the southern Pictish territory south of the Mounth, which was also probably the home territory of his predecessor Talorg. In the next year, he defeated and killed Dúnchad mac Conaing, king of the Dál Riata, at the Battle of Strathyre. This may have been part of a traditional "inaugural raid" against hostile neighbours to mark the beginning of a king's rule.

Talorgan's death in 657 may have seen Oswiu launch an offensive against the Picts, as Bede implies that Oswiu's subduing "the greater part of the Picts" took place in 658.

== Bibliography ==
- Clarkson, Tim (2016). The Picts: A History. Edinburgh: Birlinn. ISBN 9781780274034.
- Duncan, A. A. M. (1975). Scotland - the Making of the Kingdom. The Edinburgh History of Scotland. Edinburgh: Mercat Press. ISBN 9780901824837.
- Fraser, James (2009). From Caledonia to Pictland: Scotland to 795. Edinburgh: Edinburgh University Press. ISBN 9780748612321.
- Smyth, Alfred P. (1989). Warlords and Holy Men: Scotland, A.D. 80–1000. New History of Scotland. Edinburgh: Edinburgh University Press. ISBN 9780748601004.
- Williams, Ann; Smyth, Alfred P.; Kirby, D. P. (1991). A Biographical Dictionary of Dark Age Britain: England, Scotland and Wales c. 500–1050. London: B. A. Seaby. ISBN 9781852640477.

Regnal titles
Preceded by Talorc III	King of the Picts; 653-657	Succeeded by Gartnait IV
