= Meffan Institute =

Coordinates: 56.6441°N 2.8891°W

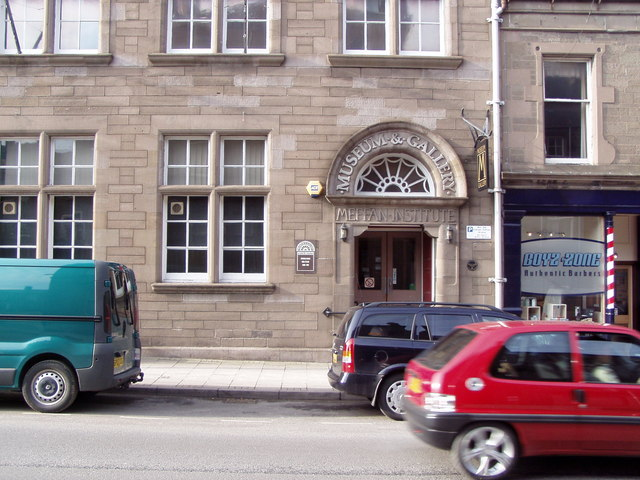
- Entrance to Meffan Institute
- Established: 1898
- Location: 20 High Street, Forfar, Angus, Scotland
- Type: museum and art gallery
- Website: Meffan Museum and Art Gallery

The Meffan Institute is a museum and art gallery in Forfar, Angus. Opened in 1898, it houses a variety of exhibits of local interest in Angus, including a collection of Pictish stones, particularly the Dunnichen Stone and the Kirriemuir Sculptured Stones as well as Roman and Medieval artefacts found in the local area. A reconstruction of historic scenes of Forfar includes representations of daily life as it would have been around the beginning of the 19th century, as well as a depiction of the execution of one of the women accused of witchcraft in the Forfar witch hunts of 1661-1666.

== Gallery ==
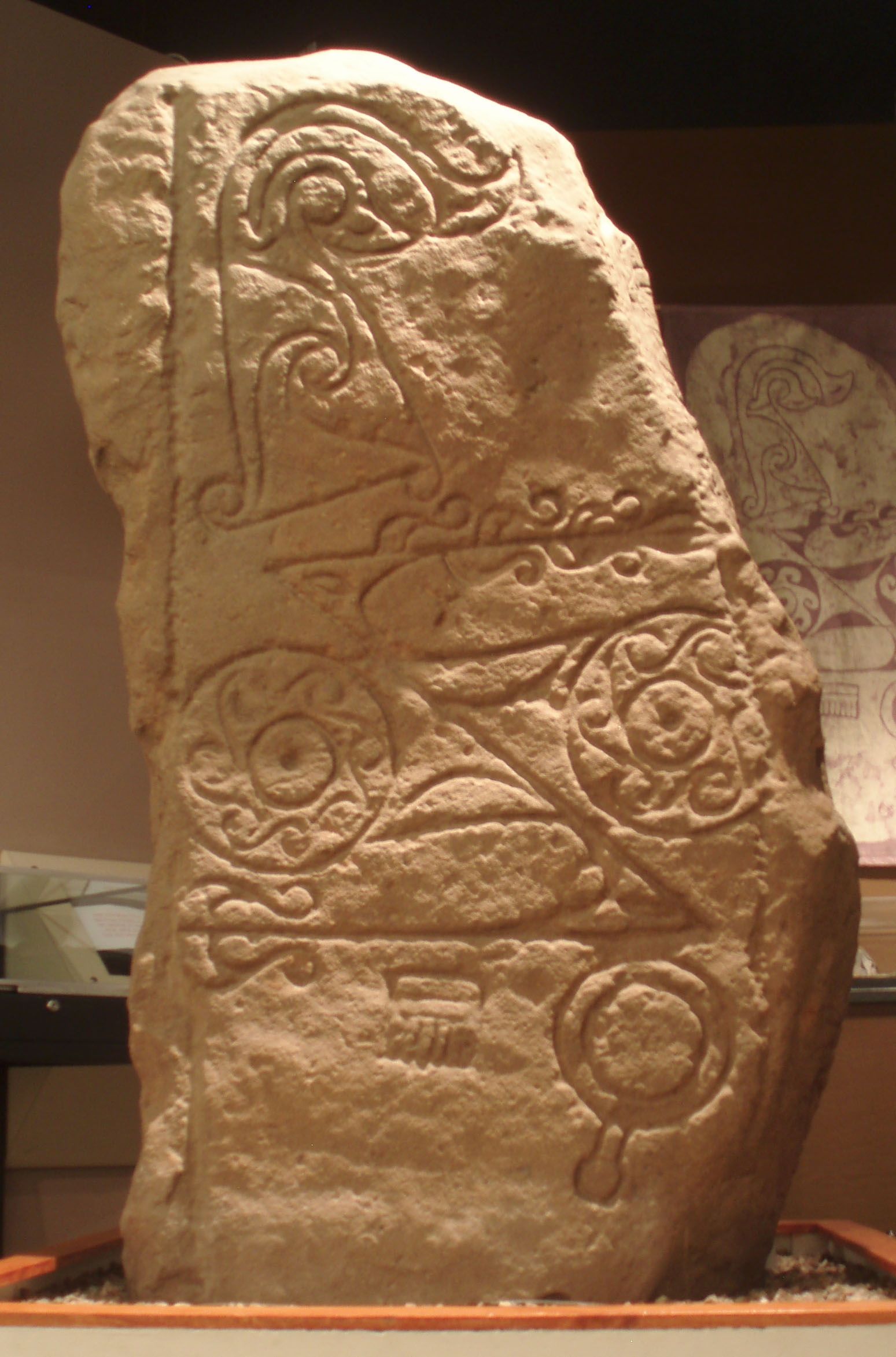
Dunnichen Stone; Class I Pictish Stone from nearby Dunnichen.

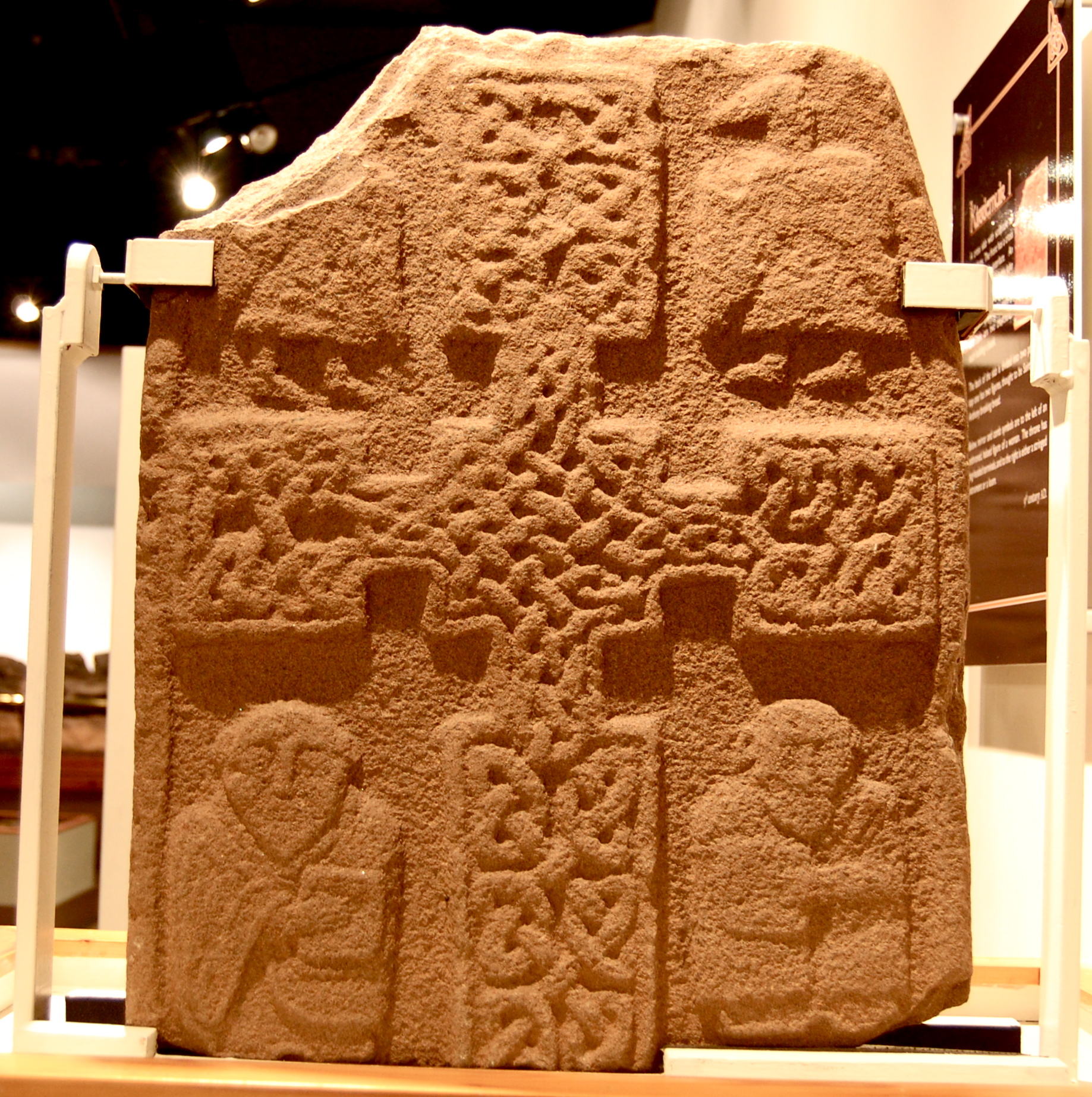
The Kirriemuir 1 Stone.

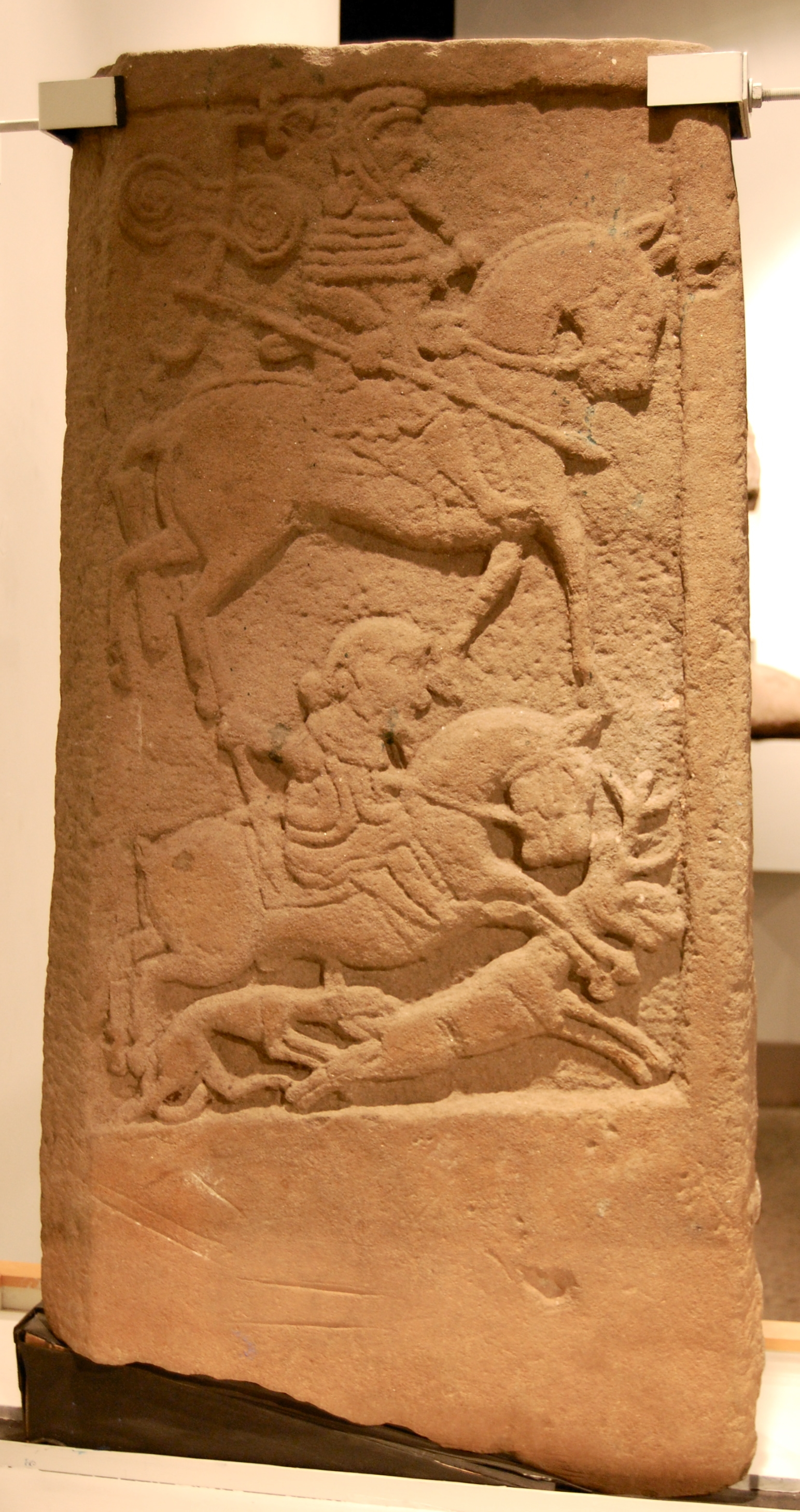
Rear of the Kirriemuir 2 stone.
