= Gartnait son of Donuel =

King of the Picts from 657 to 663

King of the Picts
- Reign: 657–663
- Predecessor: Talorgan I
- Successor: Drest VI
- Died: 663
- Father: Possibly Domnall Brecc

Gartnait son of Donuel (Old Irish: Gartnait mac Domnaill or Gartnait mac Dúngail; died 663) was king of the Picts from 657 until 663.

He succeeded Talorgan son of Eanfrith on the latter's death in 657. Like his predecessor Talorgan and his successor Drest son of Donuel, Gartnait reigned as a puppet king under the Northumbrian king Oswiu. Gartnait and Drest may have been sons of Domnall Brecc, who was king of Dál Riata from c. 629 until he was killed in 642.

The Northumbrian writer Bede implies that Oswiu subdued "the greater part of the Picts" in 658, suggesting Oswiu launched an offensive against the Picts after the death of his nephew Talorgan in 657. The Pictish Chronicle king lists give Gartnait a reign of five, six or six and a half years, corresponding with the notice of his death in the Annals of Ulster and the Annals of Tigernach in 663.

The king lists record that he was succeeded by his brother Drest, though Oswiu may have forced an interregnum on the kingdom from 663 to 666. Gartnait son of Donuel may be the Gartnait whose family are recorded by the Annals of Ulster and the Annals of Tigernach going to Ireland in 668.

== Sources ==
- Anderson, Alan Orr; Early Sources of Scottish History A.D. 500–1286, volume 1. Reprinted with corrections, Paul Watkins, Stamford, 1990. ISBN 1-871615-03-8
- Calise, J. M. P. (2002). "Personal Names Associated with the Picts: Biographical and Textual Notes". Pictish Sourcebook: Documents of Medieval Legend and Dark Age History. Westport, CT: Greenwood Publishing Group. pp. 171–261. ISBN 9780313322952.
- Duncan, A. A. M. (1975). Scotland - the Making of the Kingdom. The Edinburgh History of Scotland. Edinburgh: Mercat Press. ISBN 9780901824837.
- Smyth, Alfred P. (1989). Warlords and Holy Men: Scotland, A.D. 80–1000. New History of Scotland. Edinburgh: Edinburgh University Press. ISBN 9780748601004.
- Williams, Ann; Smyth, Alfred P.; Kirby, D. P. (1991). A Biographical Dictionary of Dark Age Britain: England, Scotland and Wales c. 500–1050. London: B. A. Seaby. ISBN 9781852640477.

Regnal titles
Preceded by Talorgan I	King of the Picts; 657–663	Succeeded by Drest VI
