= Ecgfrith of Northumbria =

King of Deira (664 to 670), King of Northumbria (670 to 685)

Ecgfrith

King of Northumbria
- Reign: 670–685
- Predecessor: Oswiu
- Successor: Aldfrith
- Born: 645
- Died: 20 May 685 (aged c. 40); Battle of Nechtansmere
- Spouses: Æthelthryth; Eormenburg
- Father: Oswiu
- Mother: Eanflæd
- Religion: Christianity

Ecgfrith (/ˈɛdʒfrɪð/; Old English: Ecgfrið [ˈedʒfrið]; c. 645 – 20 May 685) was the King of Northumbria from 670 until his death on 20 May 685. He ruled over Northumbria when it was at the height of its power, but his reign ended with a disastrous defeat at the Battle of Nechtansmere against the Picts of Fortriu in which he lost his life.

== Early life ==
Ecgfrith was born in 645 or less likely 646 to king Oswiu of Northumbria and his wife Eanflæd. At about the age of 10, Ecgfrith was held as a hostage at the court of Queen Cynewise, wife of King Penda of Mercia. Penda was eventually defeated and killed in the Battle of the Winwaed by Oswiu, a victory which greatly enhanced Northumbrian power. To secure his hegemony over other English kingdoms Oswiu arranged a marriage between Ecgfrith and Æthelthryth, a daughter of Anna of East Anglia.

== King of Northumbria ==
In 671, Ecgfrith defeated the Picts at the Battle of Two Rivers, and as a result the Northumbrians took control of Pictland for the next fourteen years. Around the same time, Æthelthryth wished to leave Ecgfrith to become a nun. Eventually, in about 672, Æthelthryth persuaded Ecgfrith to allow her to become a nun, and she entered the monastery of the Abbess Æbbe, who was aunt to King Ecgfrith, at Coldingham. A year later, Æthelthryth became founding abbess of Ely. Her taking the veil may have led to a long quarrel with Wilfrid, Bishop of York, which ended with Wilfrid's expulsion from his Episcopal see. Ecgfrith married as his second wife Eormenburg (or Iurminburh). She and Bishop Wilfrid became bitter enemies.

In 674, Ecgfrith repelled the Mercian king Wulfhere, which enabled him to seize the Kingdom of Lindsey. In 679, he fought the Mercians again, now under Wulfhere's brother Æthelred who was married to Ecgfrith's sister Osthryth, at the Battle of the Trent. Ecgfrith's own brother Ælfwine was killed in the battle and following intervention by Theodore, the Archbishop of Canterbury, Lindsey was returned to the Mercians.

In June 684, Ecgfrith sent a raiding party to Brega in Ireland under his general Berht, which resulted in the seizing of a large number of slaves and the sacking of many churches and monasteries. The reasons for this raid are unclear, though it is known that Ecgfrith acted against the warnings of Ecgberht of Ripon and that the raid was condemned by Bede and other churchmen.

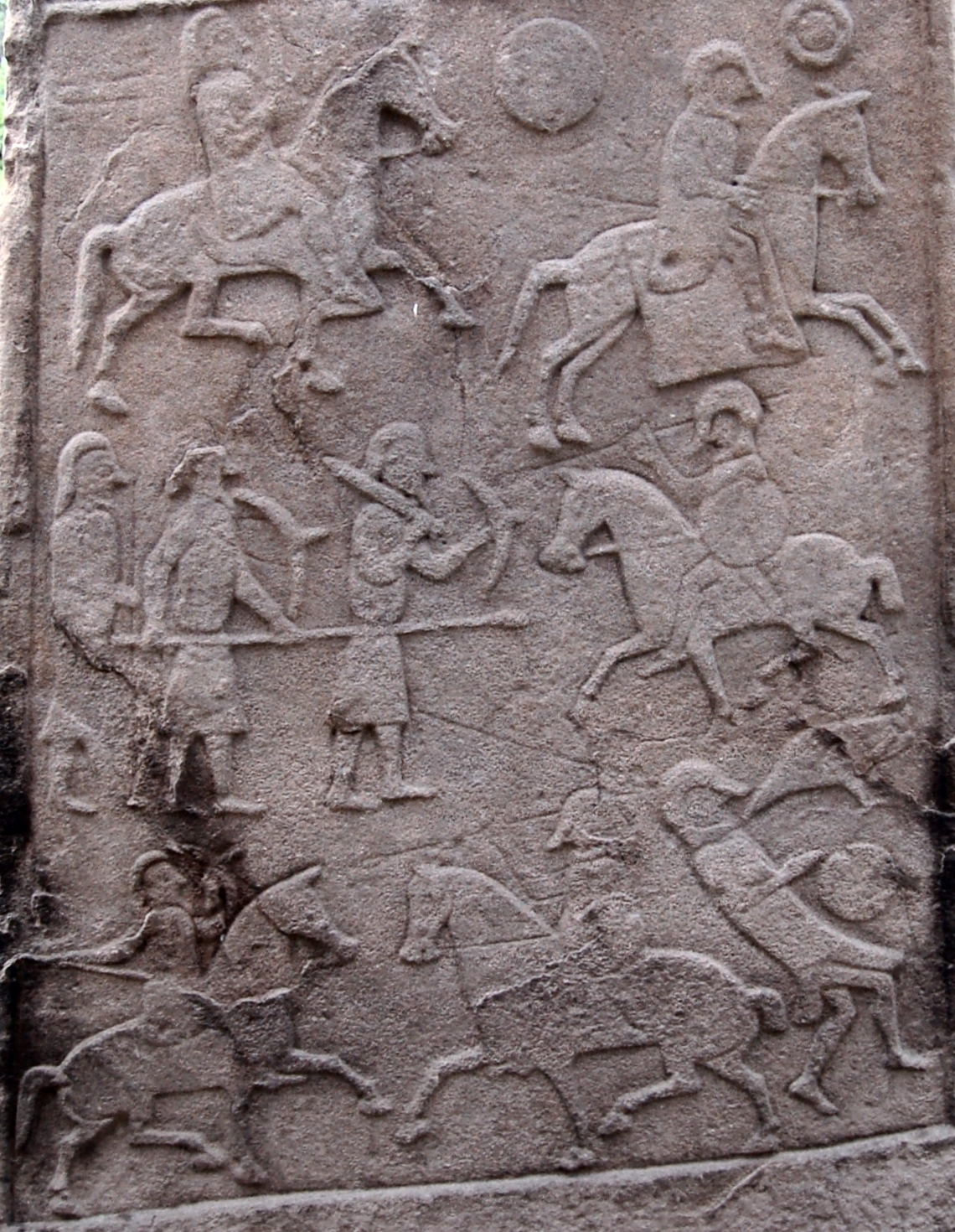
Pictish symbol stone depicting what has been generally accepted to be the Battle of Dun Nechtain, in which Ecgfrith was killed.

In 685, against the advice of Cuthbert of Lindisfarne, Ecgfrith led a force against the Picts of Fortriu, who were led by his cousin Bridei mac Bili. On 20 May, Ecgfrith was slain at the age of 40, having been lured by a feigned flight to the mountains, at what is now called the Battle of Dun Nechtain, located at either Dunnichen in Angus or Dunachton in Badenoch. This defeat, in which most of Ecgfrith's army was lost, severely weakened Northumbrian power in the north and Bede dates the beginning of the decline of the kingdom of Northumbria from Ecgfrith's death and wrote that following Ecgfrith's death, "the hopes and strengths of the English realm began 'to waver and to slip backward ever lower'". The Northumbrians never regained the dominance of central Britain lost in 679; nor of northern Britain lost in 685. Nevertheless, Northumbria remained one of the most powerful states of Britain and Ireland well into the Viking Age. Ecgfrith was buried on Iona and succeeded by his illegitimate half-brother, Aldfrith.

== Northumbrian Monasticism ==
Like his father before him, Ecgfrith supported the religious work of Benedict Biscop in the kingdom and gave him 70 hides of land near the mouth of the River Wear in 674 to undertake the building of a monastery dedicated to St. Peter. About ten years later, he made a second gift of land, 40 hides on the River Tyne at Jarrow, for the establishment of a sister house dedicated to St. Paul. These two houses came to be known as the Monastery of Wearmouth and Jarrow, an establishment made famous by the scholar Bede, who, at the age of seven, was put into the care of Benedict Biscop at Wearmouth and remained for the rest of his life as a monk. His Ecclesiastical History of the English People was completed there in 731.

== Coinage ==
Ecgfrith appears to have been the earliest Northumbrian king, and perhaps the earliest of the Anglo-Saxon rulers, to have issued the silver penny, which became the mainstay of English coinage for centuries afterwards. Coins had been produced by the Anglo-Saxons since the late 6th century, modelled on the coins being produced by the Merovingians in Francia, but these were rare, the most common being gold scillingas (shillings) or thrymsas. Ecgfrith's pennies, also known as sceattas, were thick and cast in moulds, and were issued on a large scale.

== Sources ==
- Maddicott, John (2004). "Ecgfrith (645/6–685)". Oxford Dictionary of National Biography. Oxford University Press. doi:10.1093/ref:odnb/37384. (subscription, Wikipedia Library access or UK public library membership required)
- Stephen of Ripon, Vita Wilfridi (James Raine, Historians of Church of York, Rolls Series, London, 1879–1894), 19, 20, 24, 34, 39, 44
- Bede, Historia ecclesiastica gentis Anglorum (edited by Charles Plummer, Oxford, 1896), iii. 24; iv. 5, 12, 13, 15, 19, 21, 26.
- Historiam ecclesiasticam gentis anglorum, Vol 1, Bede, ed. Charles Plummer, 1896, (Clarendon Press, Oxford): 4 mentions of "Egfrid"
- Historiam ecclesiasticam gentis anglorum, Vol. 2. Bede, ed. Charles Plummer, 1896, (Clarendon Press, Oxford): 71 mentions of "Egfrid"
