= James E. Fraser (historian) =

Canadian historian

James Earle Fraser (fl. 2000s) is a Canadian historian and Picticist. He is a graduate of the University of Toronto, and did masters work at the University of Guelph. He went on to do his Ph.D on the Christianization of Fortriu and its impact of Vikings at the University of Edinburgh, and was a senior lecturer in the School of History, Classics and Archaeology until 2015. Fraser has since returned to Canada as the Chair of the Scottish Studies Foundation at the University of Guelph.

Fraser has completed articles on various dark age topics, including St Ninian and Adomnán's Vita Sancti Columbae. He has published two books relating to Pictish and northern British warfare, and wrote the first volume in the New Edinburgh History of Scotland series, titled From Caledonia to Pictland: Scotland to 795 (EUP, 2009).

== Select bibliography ==
- Fraser, James E (2002). "Northumbrian Whithorn and the Making of St Ninian" (PDF). Innes Review. 53: 40–59. doi:10.3366/inr.2002.53.1.40. hdl:20.500.11820/1102e158-9121-4b1f-9186-b6a8bc14108c. ISSN 0020-157X.
- The Battle of Dunnichen 685, (Stroud: Tempus, 2002)
- The Roman Conquest of Scotland: the battle of Mons Graupius AD 84, (Stroud: Tempus, 2005)
- From Caledonia to Pictland : Scotland to 795 (Edinburgh: EUP, 2009)
