= Dunnichen =

Village in Angus, Scotland

Coordinates: 56.628437°N 2.805156°W

Dunnichen: Scottish Gaelic: Dùn Eachain
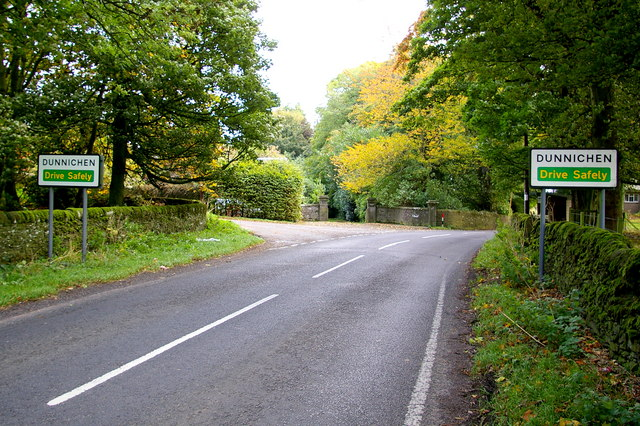
- Dunnichen

- Location within Angus
- OS grid reference: NO507488
- Council area: Angus
- Lieutenancy area: Angus
- Country: Scotland
- Sovereign state: United Kingdom
- Post town: FORFAR
- Postcode district: DD8
- Dialling code: 01307
- Police: Scotland
- Fire: Scottish
- Ambulance: Scottish
- UK Parliament: Angus and Perthshire Glens
- Scottish Parliament: Angus South

Dunnichen (Scots pronunciation: [dəˈnɪxən]; Scottish Gaelic: Dùn Eachain) is a small village in Angus, Scotland, situated between Letham and Forfar. It is close to Dunnichen Hill, at which the Battle of Dun Nechtain is popularly believed to have been fought. The church is part of the parish of Letham, Dunnichen and Kirkden.

== History ==
The name Dunnichen derives from Dùn Neachdain, meaning "fort of Nechtan", though the modern Gaelic form is Dùn Eachain.

During the 18th and early 19th centuries it was the home of George Dempster, the agricultural reformer, author and founder of the neighbouring village of Letham. Many archaeological remains are associated with the village and its environs, including the hillforts on Dunnichen hill and Dunbarrow hill.

In the early 19th century, the Dunnichen Stone, a class I Pictish standing stone was unearthed at East Mains of Dunnichen. This is now located at the Meffan Institute at Forfar.

An early local tradition, related by Headrick in the Second Statistical Account, claimed that the site was the location of the Battle of Camlann, where King Arthur fought Mordred.

A confused tradition prevails of a great battle having been fought on the East Mains of Dunnichen, between Lothus, King of the Picts, or his son Modred, and Arthur King of the Britons, in which that hero of romance was slain. Buchanan, no doubt, places the scene of that battle upon the banks of the Humber, in England. But it is probable that some battle had been fought here[...]

In 1810, antiquarian George Chalmers identified that site as the probable location of the Battle of Dun Nechtain on 20 May 685, where the Picts, led by King Bridei Mac Bili conclusively defeated a Northumbrian army, led by King Ecgfrith, resulting in Ecgfrith's death. For many years, Chalmer's theory has been accepted by historians, but this has recently been called into some doubt.

== Festival ==
In 1985, a festival based at nearby Letham Village Hall was organised by Robbie the Pict to commemorate the 1300th anniversary of the Battle of Dun Nechtain. The festival was initially received with some enthusiasm by locals and the festival became an annual event, highlights including the appearance of The Waterboys in 1987.

In its early years, festival-goers used an unofficial campsite located at the top of Dunnichen Hill, which was tolerated by local residents. This grew year by year into a free festival, much larger than the official events in Letham Village Hall, attracting at its peak around 2,500 people. The gathering on the hill became the main attraction for the vast majority of attendees, with a number of large Sound Systems playing throughout the night. While the bulk of the festival-goers stayed for the weekend, a core group of several hundred New Age Travellers occupied the hill for several weeks at a time.

The growing unpopularity of the unofficial festival with residents in Dunnichen and Letham led to the discontinuation of the official event after 1991. By this time, however, the unofficial event had taken on a life of its own. The festival was mentioned during the House of Lords debate of the Criminal Justice and Public Order Act 1994, and two years later in a House of Commons Hansard debate. In that year, 1996, violence had erupted when police had attempted to confiscate the largest sound system following numerous complaints by residents. Numerous other instances of anti-social behavior by festival-goers were listed, including the killing of livestock by travellers' dogs, including a number of sheep and 2,000 pheasant chicks.
