= Graham McGregor =

Graham McGregor may refer to:

- Graham McGregor (politician), Canadian politician
- Graham MacGregor Bull, South African-British physician
- Graham McGregor, musician from the band Fiction Factory
