= IFPRI =

IFPRI may refer to:

- International Food Policy Research Institute
- International Fine Particle Research Institute
