= Robert Latham =

Robert Latham may refer to:

- Robert Gordon Latham (1812–1888), English ethnologist and philologist
- Robert Latham (editor) (1912–1995), co-editor of the diary of Samuel Pepys
- Robert Latham (mason) (died 1713), engineer and mason
