= Alexander Ormiston Curle =

Scottish lawyer and archaeologist

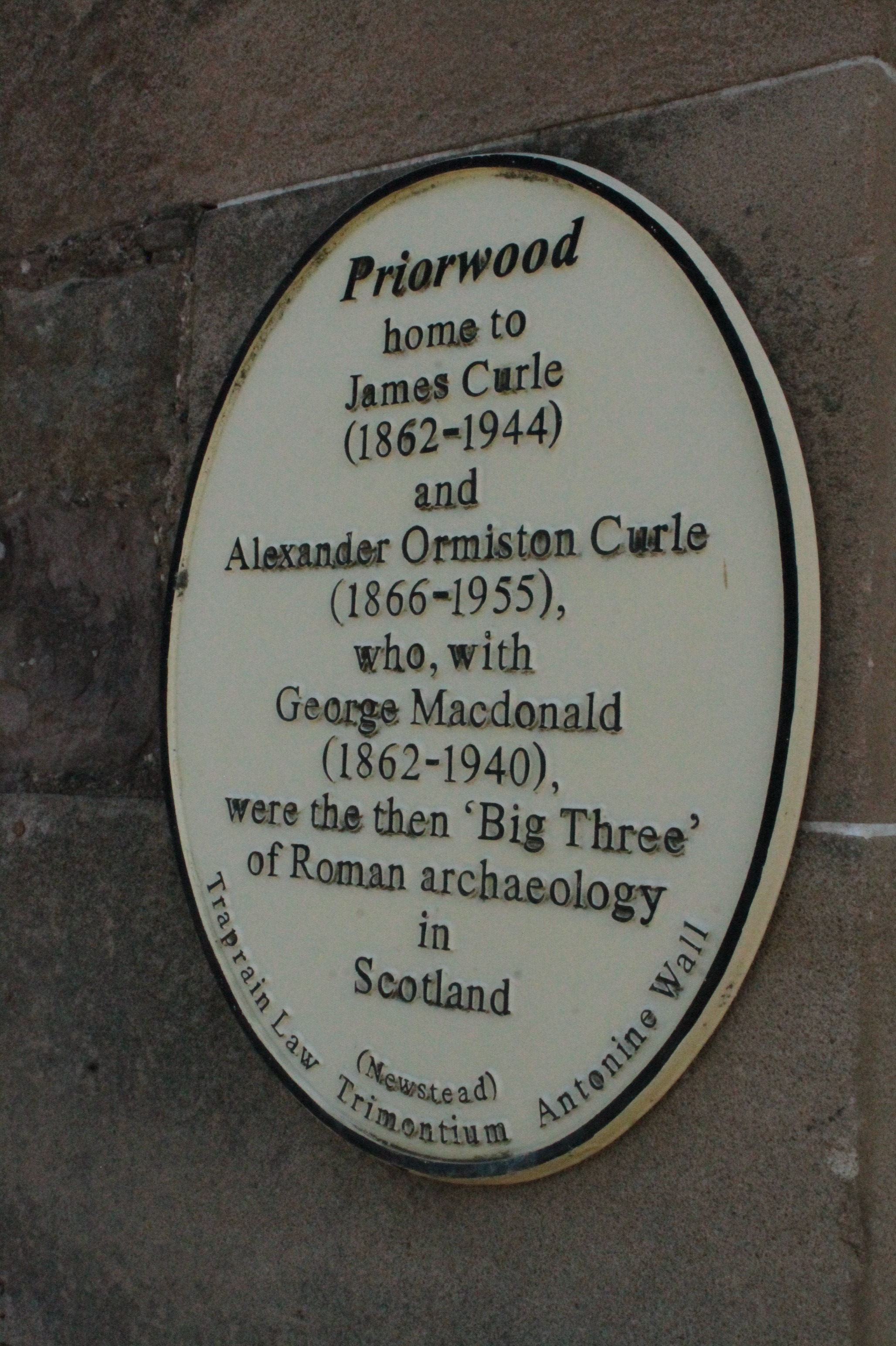
Curle plaque in Melrose

Alexander Ormiston Curle (1866–1955) was a Scottish lawyer and archaeologist who rose to be Director of the National Museum of Scotland from 1913 to 1919 and Director of the Royal Scottish Museum on Chambers Street in Edinburgh 1916 to 1931. He was also Secretary and later a Commissioner of the Royal Commission on the Ancient Monuments of Scotland. He was brother to the archaeologist James Curle.

== Life ==
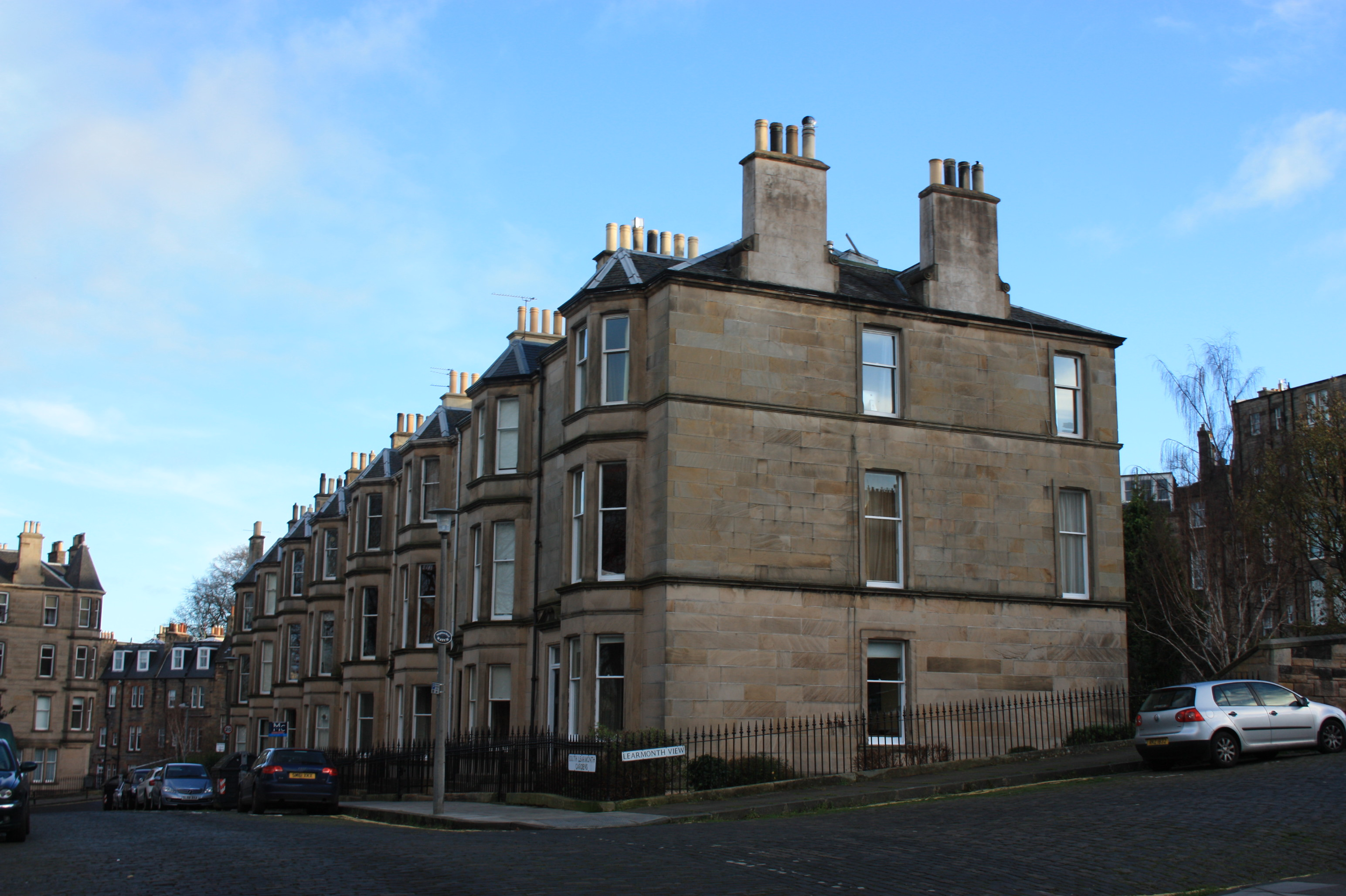
1 to 8 South Learmonth Gardens, Edinburgh (8 closest)

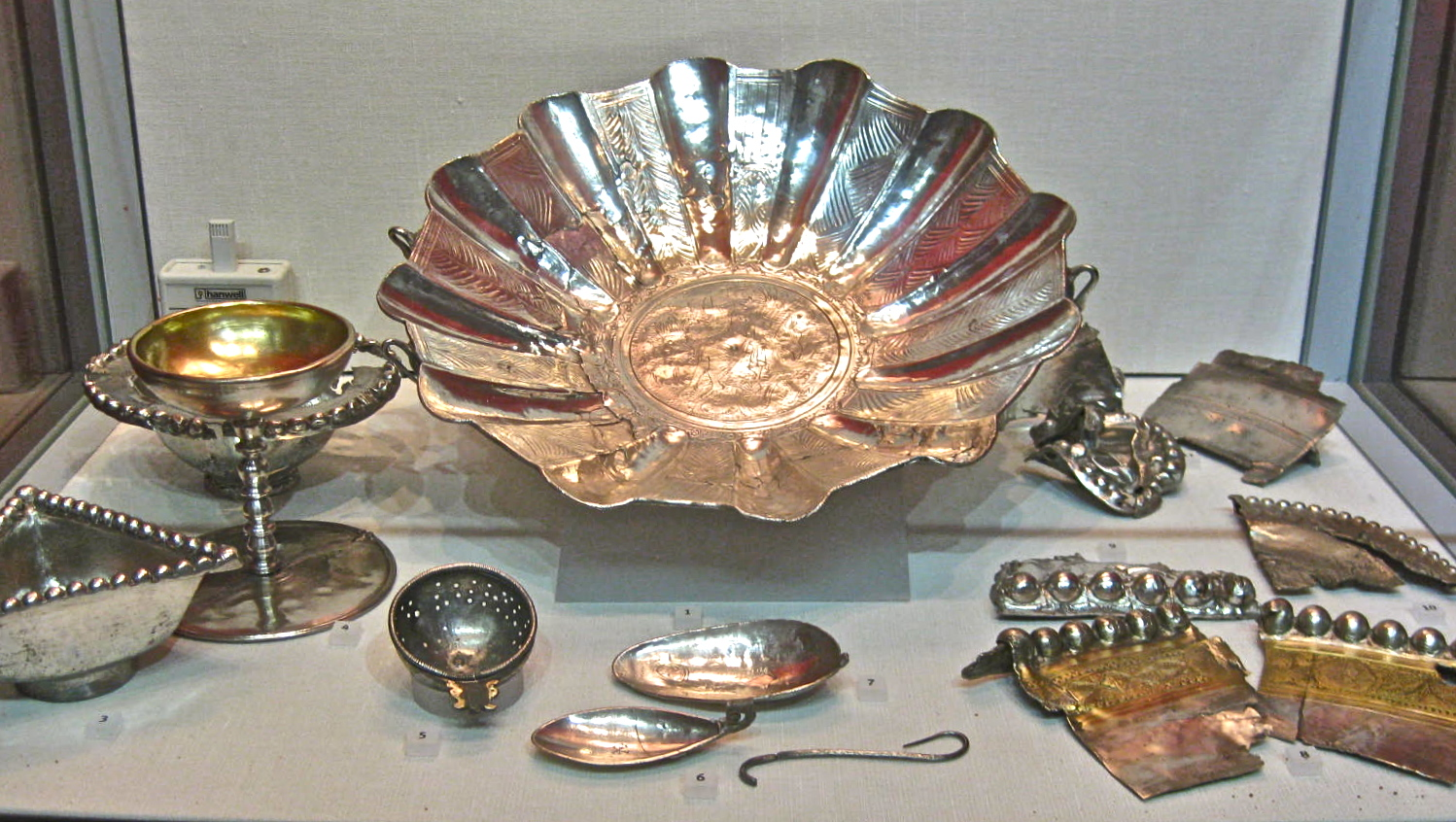
Some of the silver found at Traprain Law

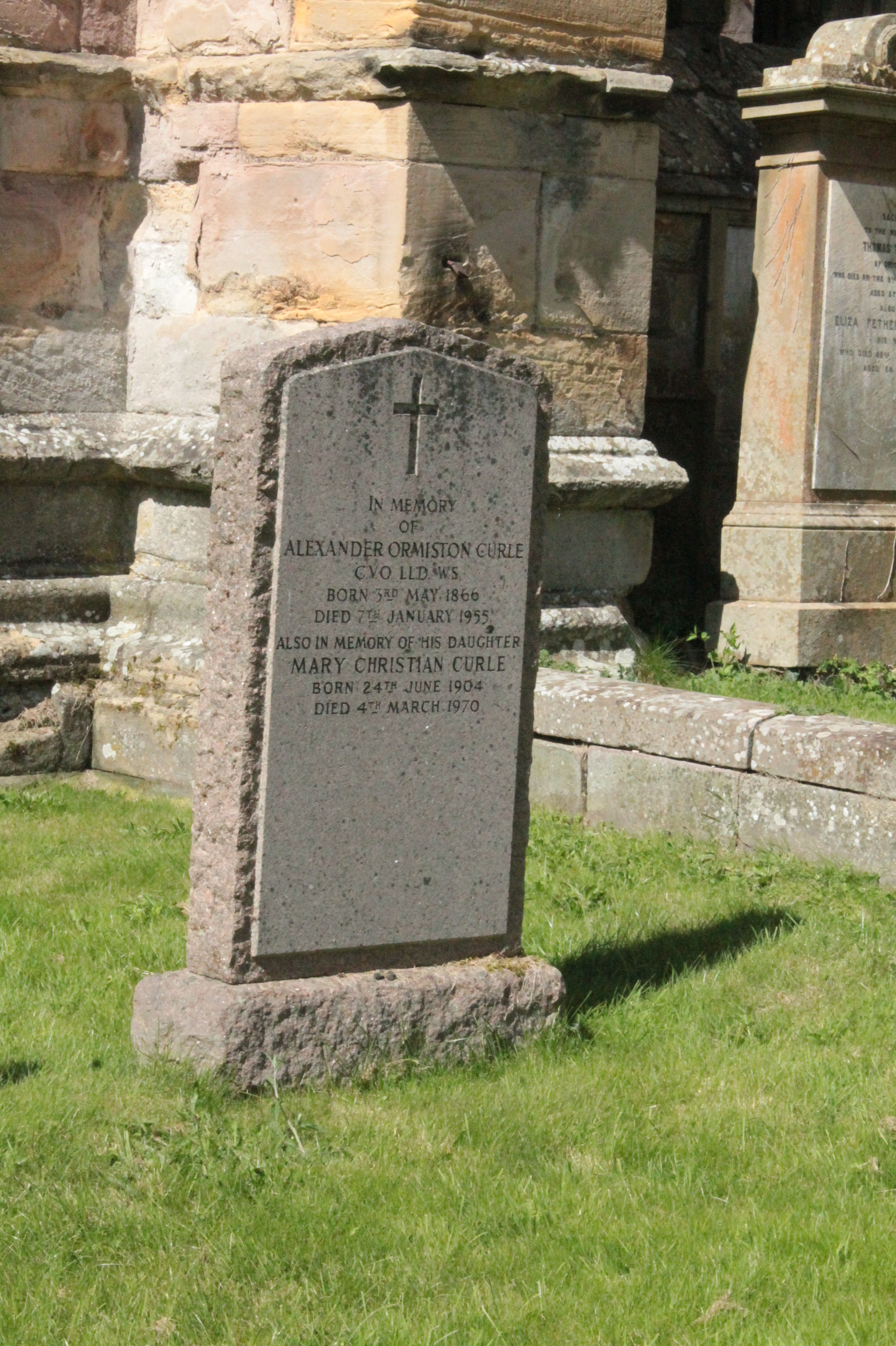
The grave of Alexander Ormiston Curle, Melrose Abbey

He was born on 3 May 1866 at Abbey Park in Melrose in the Scottish Borders the son of James Curle, a solicitor.

Despite training as a lawyer his interests quickly changed to archaeology and antiquarianism. He published 11 archaeological papers between 1896 and 1908. In 1908 he was appointed Secretary of the newly created Royal Commission of Ancient Monuments of Scotland. From August 1908 until February 1909 he set out to record all of Scotland’s important monuments, undertaking the 300 mile trip largely by bicycle. Thus was created the first Inventory of Ancient Monuments. In Edinburgh he lived at 8 South Learmonth Gardens.

In 1913 he succeeded Joseph Anderson as Director of the National Museum of Antiquities of Scotland. In 1913 he excavated a vitrified fort in Dalbeattie in south-west Scotland. In 1919 he made his most important archaeological find, a large concealment of Roman and Gallic silver plateware at Traprain Law. In 1916 he succeeded Sir Thomas Carlaw Martin as Director of the Royal Scottish Museum.

He died in hospital in Edinburgh on 7 January 1955 and is buried in the family plot on the south side of Melrose Abbey.

In 2006 a plaque was unveiled at his family home at Priorwood in Melrose, naming him and his brother James as two of the three archaeological giants in Scotland.

== Publications ==
- The Treasures of Traprain (1923)

== Family ==
He was married to Jocelyn Winifred Butler. She died in 1925 and is buried in the modern north extension of Dean Cemetery.

Their children included Mary Christian Curle (1904–1970) who is buried with him at Melrose Abbey.
