= David Chapel =

Scottish cricketer

Personal information
- Full name: David Chapel
- Born: 23 June 1882; St Vigeans, Angus, Scotland
- Died: 4 May 1912 (aged 29); Arbroath, Angus, Scotland
- Batting: Right-handed
- Bowling: Left-arm fast-medium

Domestic team information
- Years: Team
- 1909–1911: Scotland

Career statistics
Competition	First-class
Matches	4
Runs scored	68
Batting average	13.60
100s/50s	–/–
Top score	36
Balls bowled	601
Wickets	18
Bowling average	18.05
5 wickets in innings	2
10 wickets in match	–
Best bowling	5/34
Catches/stumpings	2/–
- Source: Cricinfo, 20 July 2022

David Chapel (23 June 1882 — 4 May 1912) was a Scottish first-class cricketer and advocate.

The son of the solicitor David Chapel, he was born in March 1930 at St Vigeans, Angus. He was educated at Arbroath High School, before matriculating to the University of Edinburgh. From there was admitted to the Faculty of Advocates in March 1905. A club cricketer for Grange Cricket Club, Chapel made his debut for Scotland against Ireland at Perth in 1909. He made three further first-class appearances for Scotland, playing against Ireland in 1910 and 1911, in addition to the touring Indians in 1911. As a left-arm medium-fast bowler, he took 18 wickets at an average of 18.05; he took a five wicket haul on two occasions, with best figures of 5 for 34 against the Indians. As a batsman, he scored 68 runs at a batting average of 13.60, with a highest score of 36. In May 1912, Chapel became afflicted with appendicitis, for which he underwent an operation at Arbroath on Saturday, 4 May. However, he failed to recover from the operation and died later that day. He was buried on 7 May at the Western Cemetery in Arbroath.
