= The Orme Academy =

Location
- Milehouse Lane; Newcastle-under-Lyme, Staffordshire, ST5 9JU; England
- Coordinates: 53.0265°N 2.2234°W

Information
- Type: Academy
- Motto: Empowering learners for life.
- Established: 1928; 98 years ago
- Local authority: Staffordshire
- Trust: Shaw Education Trust
- Department for Education URN: 142015 Tables
- Ofsted: Reports
- Headteacher: Mark Boughey
- Gender: Coeducational
- Age: 11 to 16
- Enrolment: 820
- Capacity: 1161
- Website: theormeacademy.org.uk

The Orme Academy, previously known as Wolstanton High School and Wolstanton County Grammar School, is a high school in Newcastle-under-Lyme, Staffordshire.

== History ==
Crest as Wolstanton High School

The school was founded in 1928, as Wolstanton County Grammar School, as a replacement for The Orme Middle School, which closed in 1927. The grammar school was originally designed for 500 male students from a catchment area that included Staffordshire and the neighbouring parts of Cheshire. In 1977 the school merged with Watlands Secondary Modern School to become the Marshlands High School, and later became Wolstanton High School in the 1980s. Starting with the academic year of 2020, the school renamed itself to The Orme Academy.

In a 2012, Ofsted judged the school as "satisfactory," but that fell to "requires improvement" by 2013. It was noted that the majority of students are of "White British backgrounds, with a small number from other ethnic groups." The number of students "eligible for free school meals is just below the national average."

== Academics ==
In 2018 Ofsted recognised this as an improving school with good leadership, raising the standards, but facing students with low aspirations – that still required improvement.

At Key Stage 3, that is in years 7, 8, 9, the staff try to engage the parents in supporting their children. Year 7 children study English, Mathematics, Science, Technology, a Foreign Language, Geography, History, Art, Music, Literacy, Physical Education, Religious Education, Computing and Personal, Social, Health and Citizenship. Extra support in English and Maths is targeted at some students. In year 8, some students are given the chance to study triple science.

At Key Stage 4, the pupils were guided into three pathways: Blue Green and Purple. These allow student to focus on a BTEC education, a GCSE academic route or more practical subjects. Each pathway follows a core curriculum of English Language, English Literature, Mathematics, Science, Computing, Religious Education, Careers, Physical Education, and Personal, Social, Health and Citizenship Education (PSHCE). These will be supplemented by options suitable for their pathway.

== Notable former pupils ==
- Lorna Bailey, artist and potter.
- Lieutenant-General Sir Derek Boorman
- Neil Burnett, Scottish cricketer
- Paul Farrelly
- Professor Nick Foskett
- Sir Ernest Roy Griffiths
- Robert Latham
- Reginald Moss
- Brian Scarlett professor of particle technology.
- Pale Waves bassist Charlie Wood.

== See also ==
- Category:People educated at Wolstanton Grammar School
