= Dorothy Angus =

Scottish embroidery artist

- Born: Anna Dorothy Angus; 19 February 1891; Stirling, Scotland
- Died: 24 April 1979 (aged 88)

Anna Dorothy Angus (19 February 1891 – 24 April 1979) was a Scottish embroidery artist.

== Biography ==
Angus was born in Stirling, the daughter of the Presbyterian minister James Angus. Angus attended Edinburgh College of Art. She went on to lead the department of Embroidery and Weaving in Gray's School of Art, Aberdeen in 1920. Angus taught there from 1920 until 1955. She was considered a transformative figure in British embroidery after the arts and crafts movement. During her tenure in the school, Angus taught Kath Whyte, who credited her with showing her the possibilities of stitchery and textiles. Angus died in Scotland on 24 April 1979, at the age of 88.
