= Arbroath High School =

Scottish comprehensive school

Location
- Keptie Road; Arbroath, Angus, DD11 3BN; Scotland; 56.562°N 2.603°W

Information
- Type: Secondary School
- Motto: Altiora Petamus
- Local authority: Angus Council
- Rector: Karen Thomson
- Staff: 79
- Gender: Mixed
- Age: 11 to 18
- Enrolment: 882
- Houses: Keptie, Lochlands, Bellrock and Cairnie
- Colour: Green Yellow
- Website: www.arbroathhigh.angus.sch.uk

Arbroath High School is a six-year, all-through comprehensive school situated on the west side of Arbroath, Angus, Scotland. It moved into its present building in 1985.

== Accommodation ==
The new building was opened in 1985 to serve the west side of Arbroath and outlying areas, such as the villages of Arbirlot, Carmyllie and Colliston.

The school was built in a residential area not far from the town centre. As well as the facilities normally associated with schools, it has priority use during the day of Arbroath Sports Centre, containing a full-sized swimming pool, squash courts, gymnasium and games hall. The general public make use of these facilities outside school hours. There are extensive playing fields adjacent to the school, including an all-weather, floodlit astroturf pitch.

== Admissions ==
Arbroath High is the larger of two secondary schools in Arbroath, the other being Arbroath Academy, which serves the east end of Arbroath and surrounding areas. Intake is from eight associated primary schools – Arbirlot, Carmyllie, Ladyloan, Colliston, Inverbrothock, Muirfield, St Thomas' and Timmergreens. A small number of pupils enter from other primaries in the surrounding areas.

== History ==
The school began life as a grammar school, formed from the former Arbroath Academy and the Free Church Educational Institution. It became and remains a state comprehensive school. Its old building now houses the Arbroath campus of Dundee and Angus College.

== Alumni ==
=== High school ===
- Neil Burnett (born 1961), cricketer
- David Chapel (1882–1912), cricketer
- Deirdre Chapman, journalist and author
- Patrick Hennessy (painter) (1915–1980), realist painter
- Kenneth Gordon Lowe (1917–2010), physician and medical researcher
- Doris Tyndall (1940–2020), athlete
- Andy Webster (born 1982), professional footballer

=== Grammar school ===
- Marion Angus (1865–1946), poet in Braid Scots and standard English
- Sir William Duke (1863–1924), Indian civil servant
- James Falconer (1856–1931), Liberal MP in 1909–1918 and 1922–1924 for Forfarshire
- Michael Forsyth, Baron Forsyth of Drumlean (born 1954), Conservative MP from 1983–1997 for Stirling, and Secretary of State for Scotland from 1995–1997
- Sir John Kirk (1832–1922), African explorer and administrator
- Cargill Gilston Knott (1856–1922), mathematician, seismologist, and expert of earthquakes in Japan
- Allan MacDonald (1892–1978), Australian politician
- George Robert Milne Murray (1858–1911), botanist
- Peter Mills (born 1955), RAF Chaplain-in-Chief and minister of the Church of Scotland
- Andy Stewart (musician) (1933–1993), singer and entertainer
- Mike Weir (born 1957), Scottish National Party MP for Angus from 2001 to 2017
- Kathleen Whyte MBE (1909–1996), embroiderer and textile-arts teacher

=== Educational Institution ===
- Joseph Anderson, antiquarian, museum keeper and author (1832–1916)
