= St Vigeans =

Coordinates: 56.576634°N 2.590824°W

St Vigeans: Scottish Gaelic: Cill Fhèichin
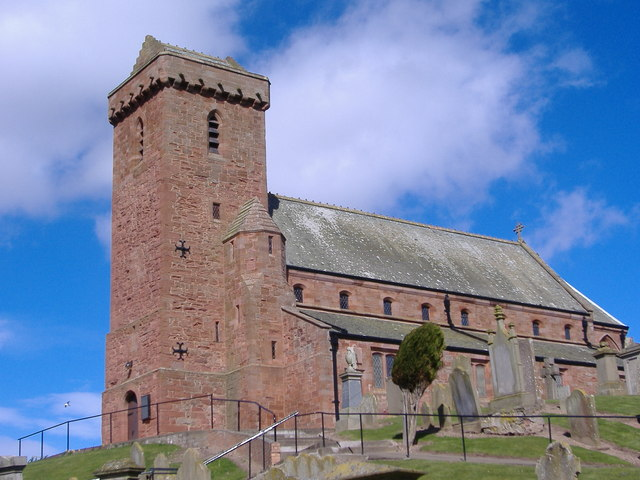
- The parish church of St Vigeans

- Location within Angus
- OS grid reference: NO638429
  - Edinburgh: 45 mi (72 km) SSW
  - London: 371 mi (597 km) SSE
- Council area: Angus
- Lieutenancy area: Angus
- Country: Scotland
- Sovereign state: United Kingdom
- Post town: ARBROATH
- Postcode district: DD11
- Dialling code: 01241
- Police: Scotland
- Fire: Scottish
- Ambulance: Scottish
- UK Parliament: Arbroath and Broughty Ferry
- Scottish Parliament: Angus South

St Vigeans (Scottish Gaelic: Cill Fhèichin) is a small village and parish in Angus, Scotland, immediately to the north of Arbroath. Originally rural, it is now more or less a suburb of the town of Arbroath.

== History ==
St Vigeans is derived from Vigeanus, a Latinised form of the Old Irish name Féichín. Saint Feichin flourished in the 7th century. There is no record of his having visited what is now Scotland, but followers of his cult may have founded a monastery among the Picts at St Vigeans as early as the 8th century. This is shown by the unusual dedication, and especially by the collection of more than thirty elaborately carved stones preserved in the St Vigeans Sculptured Stones Museum (converted from an old cottage) in the village (Historic Scotland; key from Arbroath Abbey visitor centre). The collection includes cross-slabs, some with Pictish symbols, cross fragments, recumbents, and architectural fragments. It is one of the largest and finest in Scotland of its period, and includes stonework dating from the 8th-12th centuries. Most of the stones were recovered from the parish church, into whose walls they had been incorporated as building rubble during the Middle Ages, during 19th-century 'restoration' work. Further fragments remain in the church's walls. St Feichin is also remembered in Scotland in Torphichen and Ecclefechan.

A monastic context for the St Vigeans' sculptures is suggested by some of the stones showing representations of clerics and patristic scenes. The so-called "Drosten Stone" features a much-analyzed Hiberno-Saxon inscription.

The presence of a formerly important, but moribund or redundant, monastic establishment at St Vigeans may have led William I of Scots to found nearby the Tironensian monastery of Arbroath Abbey, the former monastery's lands being donated to the new foundation.

St Vigeans Church served as parish church to the inhabitants of Arbroath up to the Reformation. Built of the local red sandstone, it was a large and impressive example of a Scottish medieval parish kirk. Its situation on top of a prominent, steep-sided mound (presumably of glacial origin, though doubtless 'improved' by landscaping) is striking. Dating in part from the 12th century, but largely 15th century in date, the church unfortunately underwent a drastic 'restoration' in the late 19th century which, while it uncovered many Pictish fragments, also replaced most of the original architectural features of the church. It retains its internal round-pillared arcades, but all the doors and windows were renewed, so their original appearance has been lost. The western tower was also heightened and 'improved' by adding a castellated top and cap-house. The 18th-century headstones in the kirkyard, some of which are notably well carved, are interesting examples of folk-art, characteristic of Angus. There was once a legend that the kirk was built with stones used by an enslaved Kelpie, and for several years the local congregation would not enter the kirk during certain services for fear the building would collapse due to the Kelpie's curse.

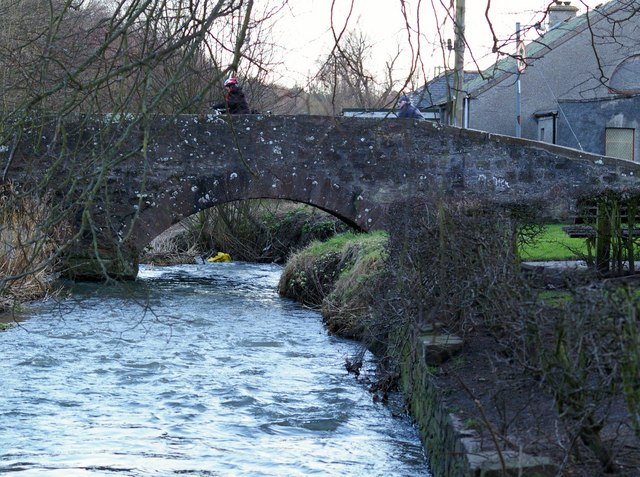
The 17th-century bridge across the Brothock Burn

The old village of St Vigeans consisted of a single street of red sandstone cottages flanking the foot of the church mound. These have been attractively restored and are well maintained. The Brothock Burn runs past the village and so through Arbroath (formerly Aberbrothock [and variants]), and is crossed by a bridge of 17th-century origin. The village lacks a shop or post-office, but does have a large public hall.

== Notable residents ==
- Joseph Anderson, antiquarian, museum keeper and author (1832-1916), grew up in St Vigeans
- Isabella Carrie, secret suffragette, was born here in 1878.
- David Chapel, cricketer and advocate, was born here in 1882
