= Kathleen Whyte =

Scottish embroiderer and teacher of textile arts

Kathleen Whyte MBE
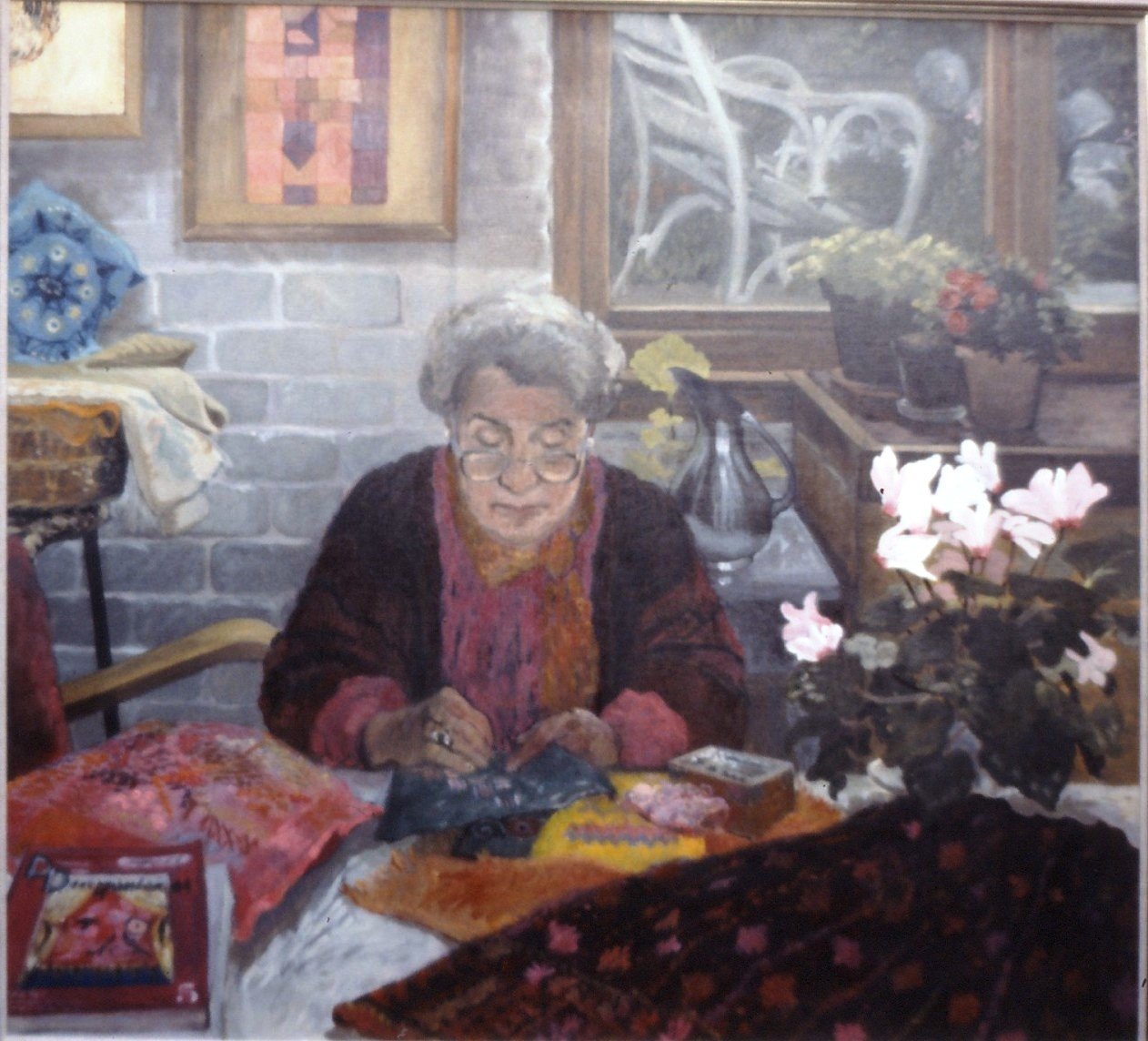
- Painting of Kathleen Whyte at work
- Born: 1909; Arbroath, Scotland
- Died: 1996 (aged 86–87)
- Known for: Embroidery, textile art instruction

Helen Kathleen Ramsay Whyte MBE (1909–1996) was a Scottish embroiderer and teacher of textile arts.

== Early life ==
Kathleen Whyte was born in Arbroath, on the east coast of Scotland, in 1909. From 1911 to 1913, and 1920 to 1923, she and her family joined her father who was working in India. The move to Jamshedpur had a huge impact on the young Kathleen. In particular the rich variety of textiles and brilliant colours made vivid impressions on her. On their return from India, Kathleen attended Arbroath High School. When at school in Arbroath she followed the curriculum derived from the system published by Anne Macbeth and Margaret Swanson published in their book Educational Needlecraft in 1911. In her final year she embroidered a huge panel of Saint Elizabeth of Bohemia.

On leaving school Kathleen went to Gray's School of Art in Aberdeen to follow a Diploma Course in General Design from 1928 to 1932. Amongst other things she studied embroidery and was strongly influenced by her teacher Dorothy Angus who inspired her with what she later described as, "the vast potential of stitchery". She was a particularly successful student, winning the Founder's Prize as the best student in the second year of the general course, the Alexander Barker Prize as a result of the competition for third year students, and in the fourth year won the Former Students Association Prize for her entry The Fish Wife. In 1932 she was awarded a Diploma in Design and Decorative Art with distinction.

== Teaching ==
After a year at Aberdeen Teacher Training College Kathleen became assistant art teacher at Frederick Street School in the East End of Aberdeen. On leaving Frederick Street in 1940 she taught briefly at the Central Secondary School and then went on the Aberdeen High School for Girls. As well as teaching children she taught adults in evening classes at the Art School. Later, during the war, she taught service men and women to do leather work.

Kathleen had been making her own clothes since the mid-1920s and in the early 1940s, because of the wartime restrictions, she began weaving fabric, not only for herself but for her mother, sisters and friends too. Despite the scarcity of material and the clothing coupon limitations she always seemed able to lay her hands on plenty of yarn.

In 1948, on the advice of Mr. D. M. Southerland, Head of Gray's School of Art, and supported by Dorothy Angus, Kathleen successfully applied for the post of embroidery and weaving lecturer at Glasgow School of Art.

This was the time of an embroidery revival in Glasgow. As Kathleen was making improvements at Glasgow School of Art, the Needlework Development Scheme was becoming more active and was beginning to make an impact on the wider public. In particular, modern stylish examples of Scandinavian embroidery and weaving were hugely influential. Over some years Kathleen travelled in Scandinavia, visiting weaving and craft centres and developing relationships with leading needle workers and weavers. There were frequent exhibitions of Scandinavian designs throughout Britain, including Glasgow School of Art whose staff and students also visited Denmark.

The Glasgow School of Art design courses were constantly being improved in response to commercial demands. Kathleen visited several English art schools to assess and evaluate the new Diploma in Art and Design courses they were teaching and was later invited to serve on the Dip AD visiting panel as the embroidery expert. She continued to be extremely influential in the development of higher education courses and became an Art Adviser to the Scottish Education Department, planning new examinations. Three of her former students became heads of the Embroidery Departments at Duncan of Jordanstone College of Art and Design, Gray's School of Art and Glasgow School of Art. In 1969 she was awarded the MBE for services to Scottish Art Education.

== Commissioned work ==
She is known for her own work, even though she has been honored for her work in education. She has worked on various important projects throughout her career, including her church work. Many of these were ⁣⁣pulpit falls⁣⁣ and communion cloths undertaken for the ⁣⁣Church of Scotland⁣⁣, depicting simple, elegantly stylised religious imagery.

However, her commissions were not limited to those for the church. In 1966 she was commissioned, by the Tay Road Bridge Joint Board, through the Scottish Craft Centre, to embroider a stole as a gift for Queen Elizabeth the Queen Mother. The stole was to be presented to the Queen Mother to commemorate her opening the Tay Road Bridge. This inspired Kathleen to create a design incorporating pearls from the River Tay. These were supplied by a jeweller in Perth, pierced for sewing, and ranging in size from tiny seeds to 9.5 mm in diameter. The Tay Bridge Stole was worn by Her Majesty and was exhibited at the "Skill" exhibition staged by the Institute of Directors, The Craft Centre of Great Britain and the Scottish Craft Centre in 1968. It was shown again in 1987 in a retrospective exhibition of her work, organised by the Scottish Branch of the Embroiders' Guild and held in the Edinburgh College of Art.

Kathleen's book Design in Embroidery was published in 1982 and Kathleen Whyte Embroiderer, her biography written by Liz Arthur, was published in 1989.

The work of Kathleen Whyte was featured in "A Scottish Celebration", a touring exhibition of contemporary textiles to mark the centenary of the foundation of the Embroiderers' Guild, which opened at Aberdeen Art Gallery in October 2006. Examples of her work can be found in the Royal Scottish Museum, the Victoria and Albert Museum, many churches, and in other public and private collections.
