= Thomas Carlaw Martin =

Scottish newspaper editor and Director of the Royal Scottish Museum

Sir Thomas Carlaw Martin FRSE LLD (10 April 1850 – 26 October 1920) was a Scottish newspaper editor and Director of the Royal Scottish Museum.

== Life ==
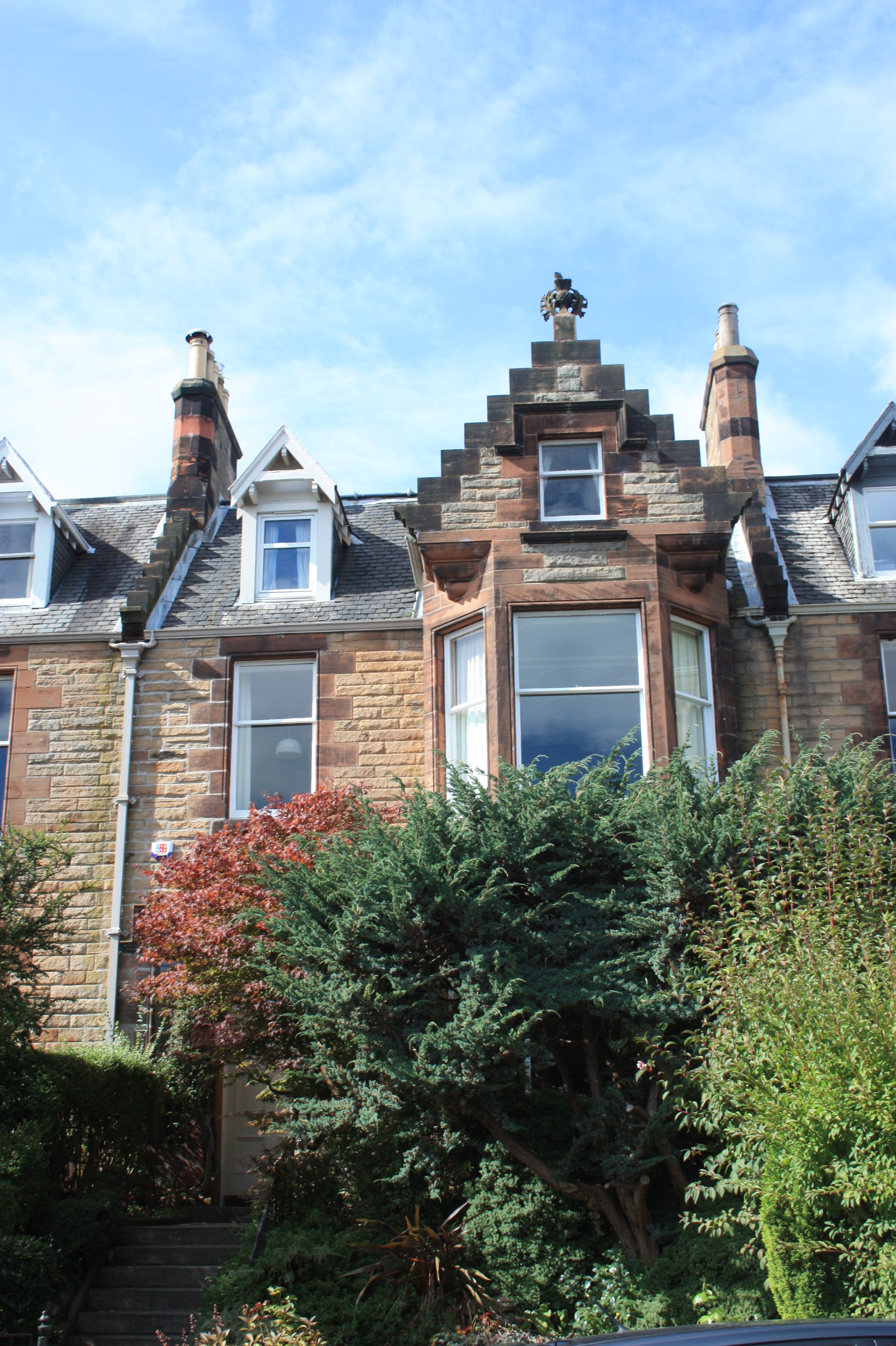
4 Gordon Terrace, Edinburgh

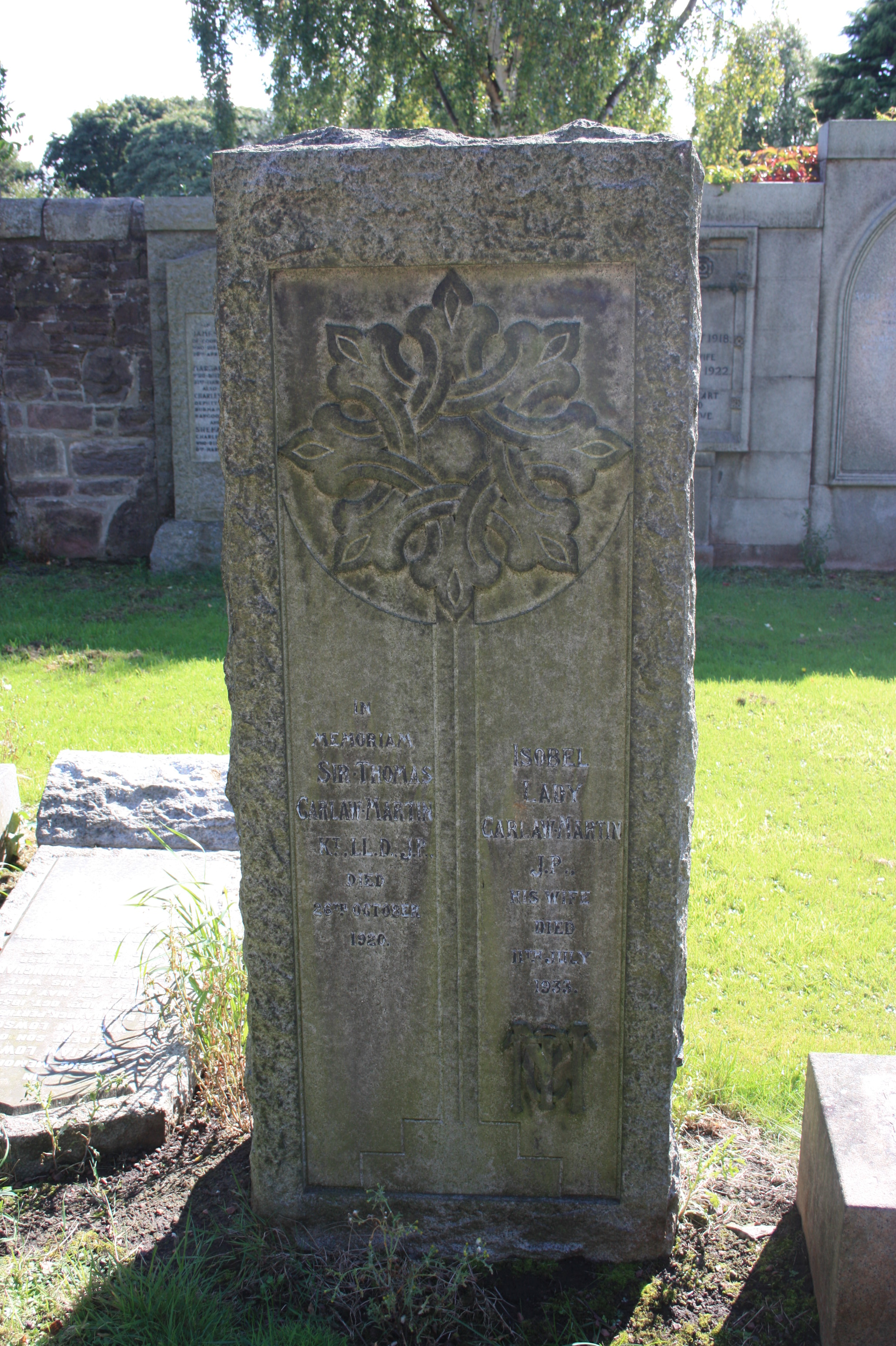
The grave of Sir Thomas Carlaw Martin, Grange Cemetery, Edinburgh

He was born at Woodcocklaw Farm in Linlithgow on 10 April 1850. He studied at Heriot-Watt College and then the University of Edinburgh.

After an initial start as a Post Office engineer, he became a journalist and then a newspaper editor, overseeing two Liberal publications: the "Scottish Leader" and "Dundee Advertiser". The University of St Andrews awarded him an honorary doctorate (LLD) in 1903. Living in Dundee from 1895 to 1910 he lived at 23 Springfield.

He was knighted by King Edward VII in 1902 for his contribution to transport proposals. In 1911 he was appointed Director of the Royal Scottish Museum in Edinburgh, succeeding David Vallance. In 1912 he was elected a Fellow of the Royal Society of Edinburgh. His proposers were Sir William Turner, Cargill Gilston Knott, John Horne, and James Burgess.

In later life, he lived at 4 Gordon Terrace in southern Edinburgh.

When he retired in 1916 from the museum, he was succeeded by Alexander Ormiston Curle.

He died in Edinburgh on 26 October 1920. He is buried with his wife in the Grange Cemetery in southern Edinburgh. The grave lies on the southern path, just east of the central path.

== Family ==
In 1879, he married Isobel Laurie Spence.

== Publications ==
- Custody and Guardianship of Children (1885)
- An Introduction to the Study of Crystals (1912)

== Artistic recognition ==
He was painted by William Quiller Orchardson around 1905.
