= Joseph Anderson (antiquarian) =

Scottish antiquarian

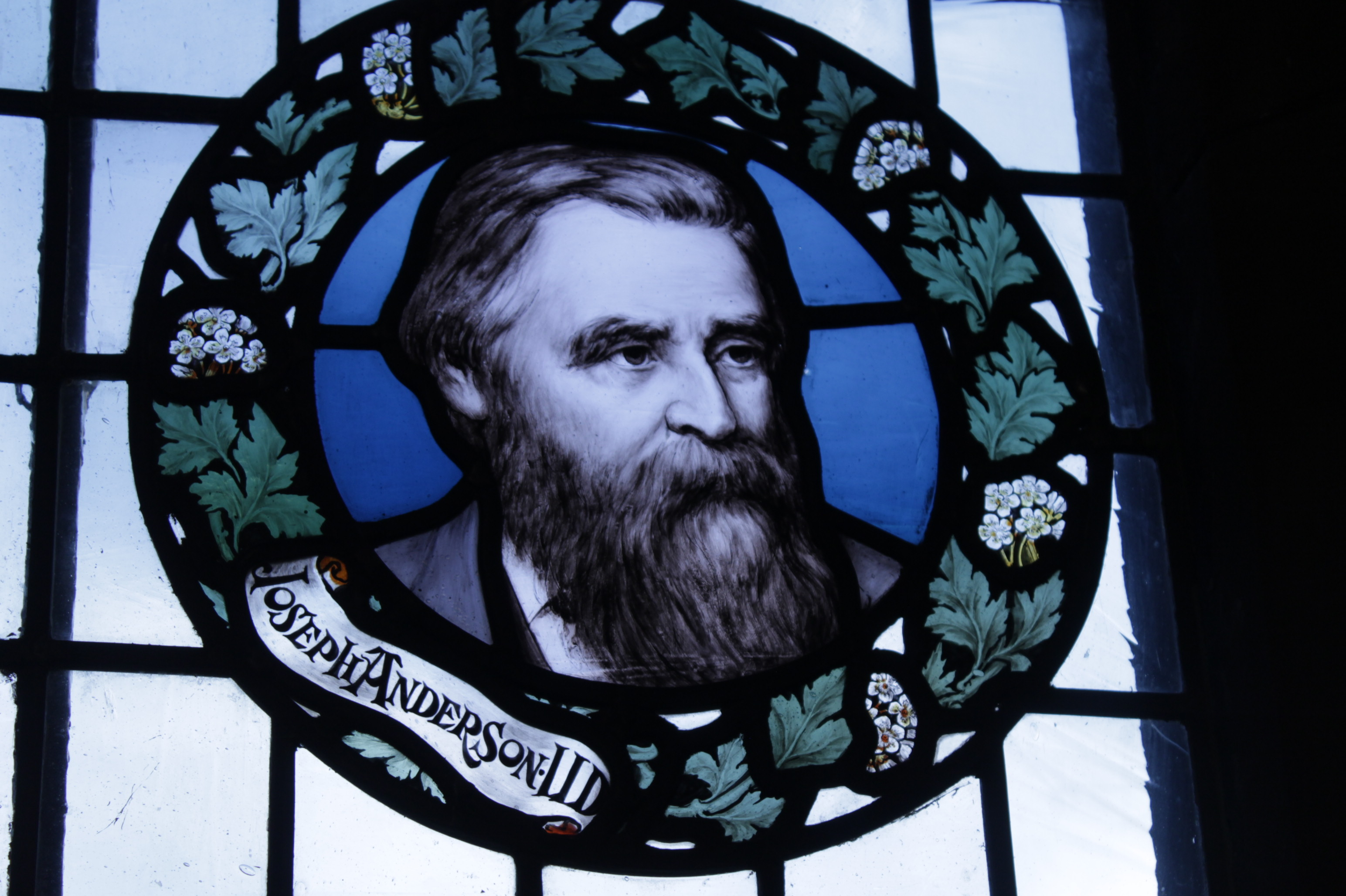
Stained glass of Joseph Anderson LLD in the Scottish National Portrait Gallery

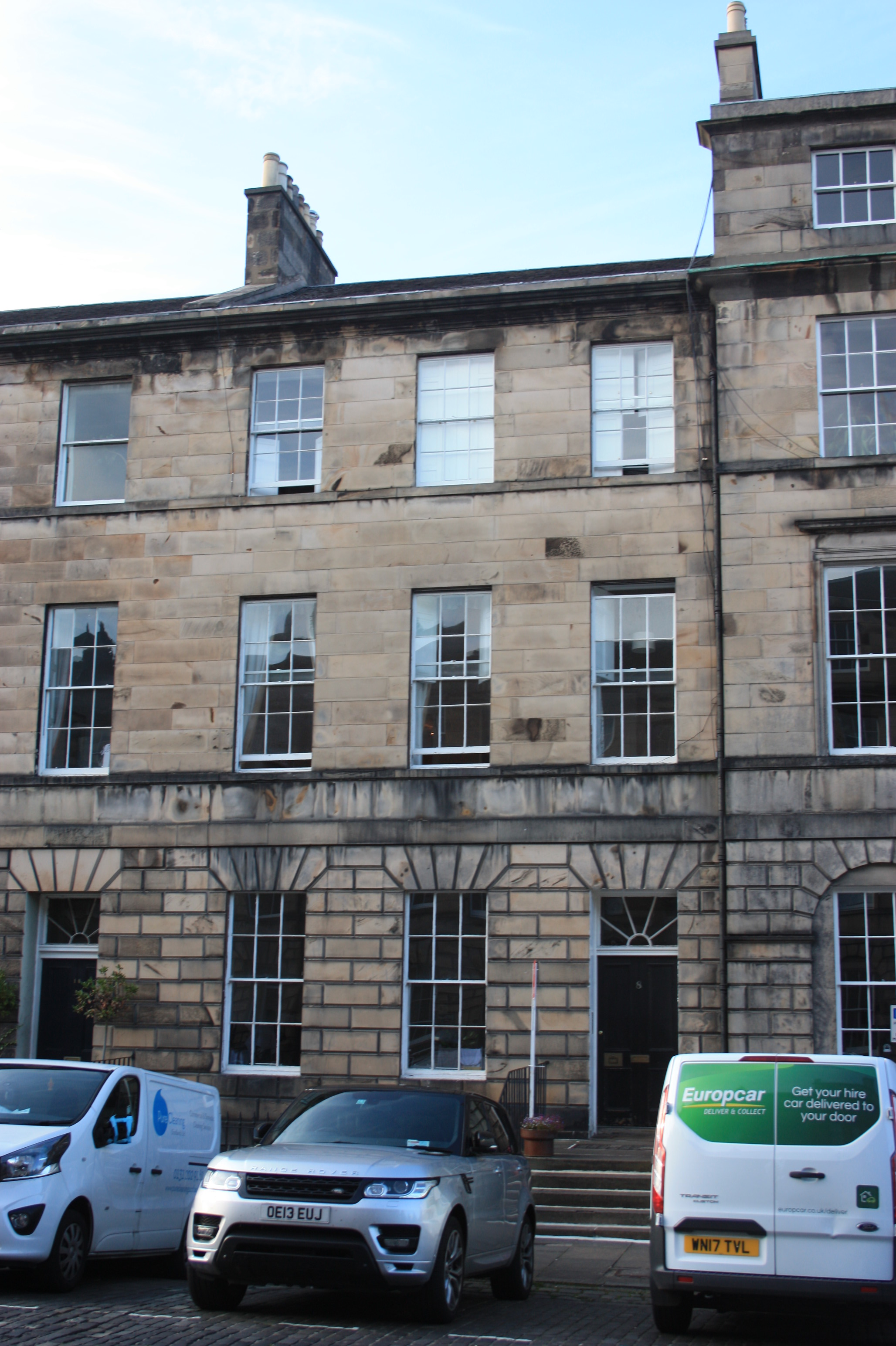
8 Great King Street, Edinburgh

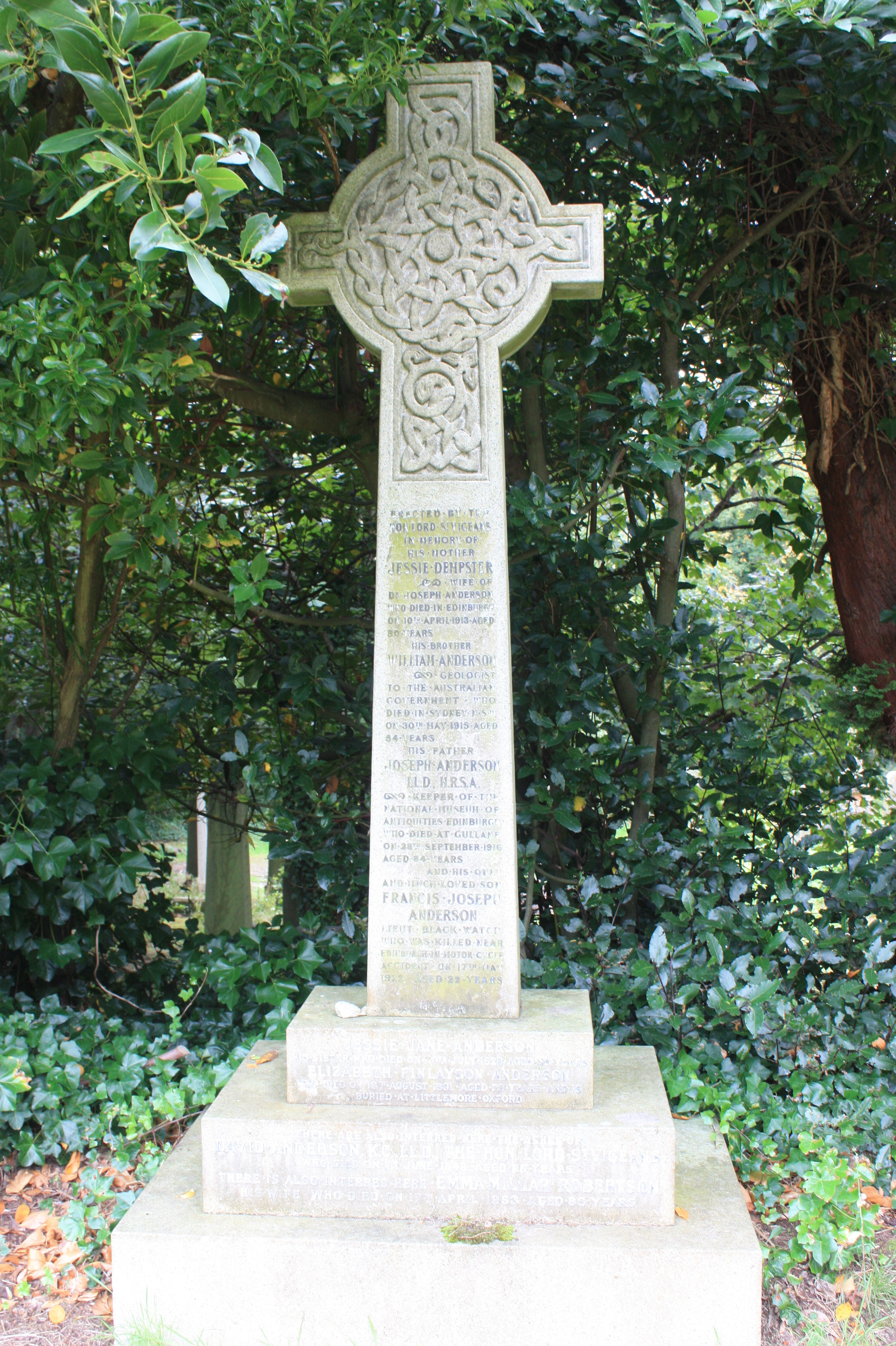
The grave of Joseph Anderson LLD, Warriston Cemetery

Joseph Anderson LLD HRSA (1832–1916) was a Scottish antiquarian who served as keeper of the National Museum of Antiquities of Scotland from 1869 to 1913.

== Life ==
Anderson was born in Angus, the son of an agricultural labourer, grew up in St Vigeans and attended Arbroath Education Institution. He taught at the English School in Constantinople from 1856 to 1859.

In 1860, after moving back to Scotland, he became editor of the John O'Groat journal. At this time he started to excavate in Caithness, in partnership with Robert Shearer.

From 1869 to 1913, 44 years, he was the keeper of the National Museum of Antiquities of Scotland. He was also editor of the Proceedings of the Society of Antiquaries of Scotland from 1869 to his death in 1916.

V. Gordon Childe wrote that by 1886 Anderson "had sketched the essential outlines of Scottish prehistory in a comprehensive and scientific survey such as then existed in no other country".

As keeper of the National Museum, he oversaw an "enormous growth in the Museum’s collections", and emphasised the importance of record-keeping. DV Clarke states that:

"Anderson’s scholarship was, at its best, challenging and provocative, rivalling that of the finest European scholars of his day", but that "for many years a vibrant and influential figure in Scottish archaeology, in the end he became a poor reflection of once-innovative attitudes".

He retired from the Museum in 1913 following the death of his wife and was succeeded by Alexander Ormiston Curle.

Anderson lived most of his later life at 8 Great King Street in New Town, Edinburgh.

He died in Gullane on 28 September 1916 and is buried beneath a large Celtic cross amongst the trees in the section north of the vaults in Warriston Cemetery in north Edinburgh.

== Family ==
He was married to Jessie Dempster (1833-1913).

One son, William Anderson (1861-1915), was a geologist who emigrated to Australia and died in Sydney. Another was the advocate and judge David Anderson, Lord St Vigeans who served as Chairman of the Scottish Land Court from 1918 to 1934.
