= Kenneth Gordon Lowe =

Scottish nephrologist and cardiologist

- Born: 29 May 1917; Arbroath
- Died: 13 August 2010 (aged 93); West Ferry, Dundee (about 3 km west of Broughty Ferry)

Kenneth Gordon Lowe CVO FRCPE FRCP (1917–2010) was a Scottish physician who did pioneering research as a nephrologist and as a cardiologist.

== Biography ==
After education at Arbroath High School, he studied medicine at the University of St Andrews and the Dundee Royal Infirmary (DRI). In 1941 he graduated MB ChB from the University of St Andrews and shortly thereafter married Nancy Young, a medical student in his graduating class. He worked at the DRI and assisted with Daniel F. Cappell's pioneering blood transfusion service in Dundee. In 1942 he became a captain in the RAMC; for about two years he specialised in tropical diseases and served in the Caribbean, India, Egypt and Panama.

Rejoining his family in London after the war, he resumed postgraduate training and was medical registrar at the Postgraduate Medical School, Hammersmith Hospital from 1947 to 1951. There he worked with Graham Bull and Mark Joekes on Britain's first artificial kidney machine, invented by Kolff in the Netherlands. Their pioneering studies on the pathology, outcome and treatment of acute renal failure were published in the Lancet and in Clinical Science.

Based upon his work with Bull and Joekes, Lowe graduated in 1950 with an MD degree from the University of St Andrews with an MD (Honours) thesis, which won the university's Rutherford gold medal. In 1952 he was appointed senior lecturer in medicine at St Andrews and honorary consultant physician at DRI. He developed a metabolic clinic with William Kinnear Stewart and the medical biochemist Henry Gemmell Morgan.

A member of the Medical Research Council committee that recommended reducing vitamin D content in children’s diet supplements designed to prevent rickets, he published (with three others) a paper entitled ‘The idiopathic hypercalcaemic syndromes of infancy’ (Lancet, 1954, 267, 101–10).

Lowe was elected FRCPE in 1954 and FRCP in 1963. In 1960 he was elected a member of the Harveian Society of Edinburgh. In 1967 he published with Hamish Watson and Donald Emslie-Smith an important paper on intra-cardiac electrocardiography of the bundle of His; this was part of a research effort leading to therapeutic cardiac ablation techniques and improved cardiac pacemakers.

In 1961 Lowe stopped teaching to become a full-time consultant in the health service, but continued in the University of St Andrews as honorary reader and then honorary professor. He was in 1959 a member of the committee, led by Dr A. A. Fitzgerald Peel, that founded the Scottish Society of Physicians, and he served as the Society's president in 1973.

Lowe was appointed in 1971 physician to the Queen in Scotland. When he retired in 1982 he was made Commander of the Royal Victorian Order (CVO). His wife died in 1999. Upon his death in 2010 he was survived by a daughter Alison, two sons Gordon and Graham, and five grandchildren.
