= St Vigeans Sculptured Stones Museum =

Museum in Angus, Scotland

Coordinates: 56.5770°N 2.5904°W

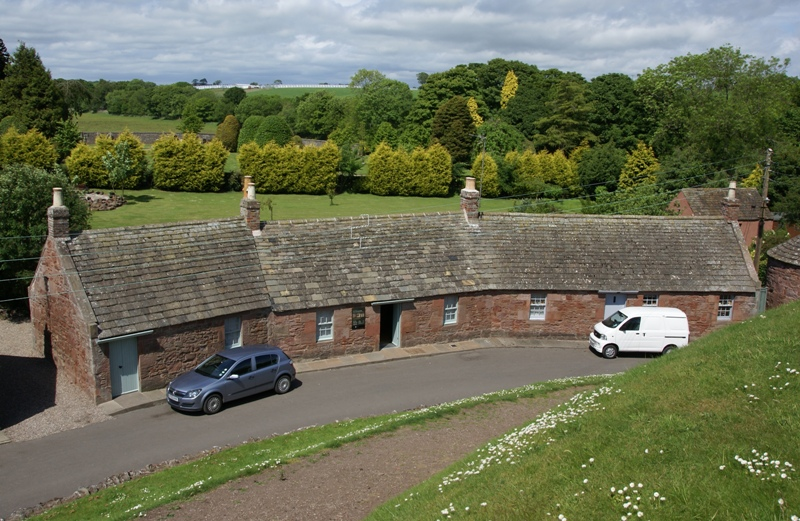
St Vigeans Museum

St Vigeans Sculptured Stones Museum, located in the Angus village of St Vigeans, houses an outstanding collection of Pictish carved stones. St Vigeans, close to Arbroath, was the centre of a royal estate in the Early Middle Ages, and was of religious importance as a monastery founded in the 8th century. The present-day St Vigeans Church was built in the 12th century, on a 40-foot (12 m) mound.

The museum displays 38 carved stones which formerly stood upon the old church mound. Among the stones on display is the 9th-century Drosten Stone, a flat rectangular slab with a cross carved on one side and Pictish symbols on the other, and also bearing a Pictish inscription in Latin script. The museum is managed by Historic Scotland and is housed in two adjoining sandstone cottages close to the church. The 19th-century cottages are a category B listed building.

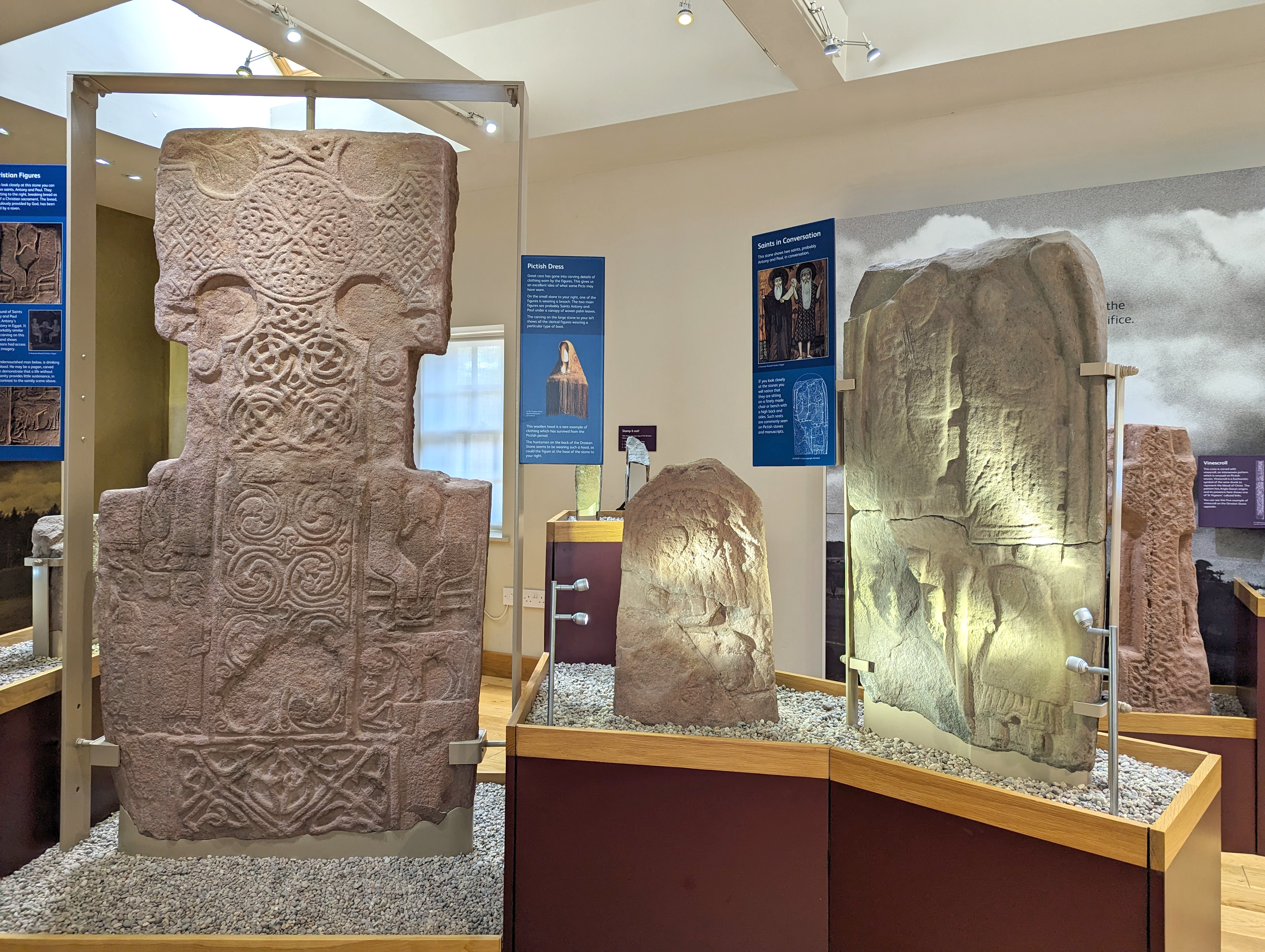
Sculptured Stones
