= International Fine Particle Research Institute =

Cooperative organisation

International Fine Particle Research Institute (IFPRI)
- Founded: 1979
- Type: Non-profit
- Location: Woodbury, Minnesota, USA
- Region served: Global
- Key people: Willie Hendrickson, IFPRI President
- Website: http://www.ifpri.net/

The International Fine Particle Research Institute (IFPRI) is a cooperative organisation concerned with advancing the fundamentals of fine particle technology. Its mission statement is "To define long-term research objectives in particle science and engineering aligned with the industrial agenda, providing the scientific foundations that will lead to the discovery of new and improved materials, and more efficient manufacturing process technology".

It was started in 1979 by 5 academics concerned with particle technology: Bob Pfeffer (City College of New York); Kurt Leschonski (Clausthal University of Technology); Koichi Iinoya (Kyoto University); Brian Scarlett (Loughborough University); and Frank Tiller (University of Houston), supported by 12 international companies.

As of 2017 it consists of a consortium of 23 industrial companies and some individual members who are engaged in particle research. The industrial members provide funding for research which is administered by IFPRI: the Institute is not institutionalized in a building. The research is published in the academic literature. In addition, IFPRI has produced over 500 research reports, giving the progress of projects which it has funded. It provides networking for industry and academics in the area of particle technology via steering groups and through an annual meeting, and organizes workshops such as "Particle Technology Education in the Twenty-First Century Workshop" (April, Sheffield, UK).
