= Neil Burnett =

Scottish cricketer (born 1961)

Personal information
- Full name: Neil William Burnett
- Born: 16 December 1961 (age 64); Wolstanton, Staffordshire, England
- Batting: Right-handed
- Bowling: Right-arm medium

Domestic team information
- Years: Team
- 1986–1989: Scotland

Career statistics
Competition	First-class	List A
Matches	1	11
Runs scored	4	118
Batting average	4.00	13.11
100s/50s	–/–	–/–
Top score	4	27
Balls bowled	78	332
Wickets	0	6
Bowling average	–	40.50
5 wickets in innings	–	–
10 wickets in match	–	–
Best bowling	–	2/60
Catches/stumpings	–/–	–/–
- Source: Cricinfo, 20 July 2022

Neil William Burnett (born 16 December 1961) is an English-born Scottish former cricketer.

Burnett was born at Wolstanton near Newcastle-under-Lyme, where he was initially educated at Wolstanton Grammar School. After moving to Scotland, he continued his education at Arbroath High School. A club cricketer for Arbroath United Cricket Club, Burnett made his debut for Scotland in a List A one-day match against Worcestershire at Glasgow in the 1986 Benson & Hedges Cup. Over the next three years, Burnett was a regular member of the Scottish one-day side, making eleven appearances across the Benson & Hedges Cup and the NatWest Trophy. In his eleven one-day matches, he scored 118 runs at an average of 13.11, with a highest score of 27. With his right-arm medium pace bowling, he took 6 wickets at a bowling average of 40.50, with best figures of 2 for 60. In addition to playing one-day cricket for Scotland, Burnett also made a single appearance in first-class cricket against Ireland in 1986, scoring 4 runs in the match and going wicketless across both Ireland innings'.

Burnett later captained Arbroath, and following the end of his playing career he served as club president. Outside of cricket, Burnett was a civil servant.
