= Lorna Bailey =

British designer

Lorna Bailey (born 1978) is an English potter and businesswoman.

== Life and work ==
Lorna Bailey was brought up in the Wolstanton area of Newcastle-under-Lyme, England, close to the Potteries area of Stoke-on-Trent. She attended Ellison Primary School, Wolstanton, and then Wolstanton High School.

After school, Bailey attended Stoke-on-Trent College. She obtained a B.Tec National Diploma (Ceramics) and then joined her father's new business, LJB Ceramics, at the Old Ellgreave Pottery, Burslem, Stoke-on-Trent, which produced Toby Jugs and other decorated pottery, where she initially worked as a painter. At the same time, Bailey began designing a series of cottage and trees and abstract patterns based on the pottery of Clarice Cliff. These were produced by the Old Ellgreave Pottery in underglaze colours. In December 1995, when Bailey was 17, her House and Path and Sunburst patterns were put into full production. These were painted by Bailey and a small team of painters onto a range of shapes, including vases, jugs, teapots, sugar shakers, cruets, candlesticks, and wall pockets. They were then sold primarily to trade buyers. In addition to being marked with a factory stamp, Bailey signed almost all of her pieces.

Typical signature, factory stamp and painter's initials

In 1998, Collect it! magazine, featured her Astro Rocket Sugar Sifter on the cover which the magazine had commissioned. This was produced in a limited edition of 250 available for purchase only through the magazine. The Lorna Bailey Collectors Club was formed in September 1998. Bailey was named as Midlands Business Woman of the Year for 1998, and Stoke Sentinel Businesswoman of the Year in 1999.

Top Bridge Works, April 2004

In 2001 the LJB Ceramics shop closed, to move away from an area used for solicitation by prostitutes, which the firm claimed was affecting their business. The shop was also said to have had items including condoms and hypodermic needles posted through the letterbox.

In March 2002, Bailey married Tim Procter. This event was marked by the issue of a small ceramic wedding cake which was sent out as a gift to all Collectors Club members. On 16 July 2002, the couple attended a Garden Party at Buckingham Palace.

The Old Post Office, Burslem, October 2006

In February 2003, LJB Ceramics changed its name to Lorna Bailey Artware. The following month, the factory moved into new premises at Top Bridge Works, Burslem. In October 2004, it moved again to its site at The Old Post Office, Burslem.

In December 2005, Bailey issued the first of a series based on Pop and Rock Legends of the Twentieth Century with a ceramic figure of John Lennon dressed in the outfit pictured in the album Sgt. Pepper's Lonely Hearts Club Band. Figures of the other Beatles later followed, together with other wares depicting members of the group. These were produced in collaboration with The Beatles Story Museum in Liverpool.

In January 2008, Bailey announced her decision to retire from the pottery industry to concentrate on her family life and in May 2008 Lorna Bailey Artware went into voluntary liquidation, with the loss of seven jobs

== Awards ==
In July 2005, Bailey was awarded an Honorary Doctorate of Staffordshire University for her services to pottery design.

In 2007, Bailey was elected as Fellow of the Royal Society of Arts (FRSA).

== Gallery ==
House and Path Pattern (1995–1998)

Sunburst Pattern (1995–1998)

Prototype Charles Rennie Mackintosh Lamp (1996)

May Bank Vase (1996–1997)

Astro Rocket Sugar Sifter (1998)

Twenties Elegance Set (1998)

Pagoda Garden Pattern on Miniature Coffee Set (1998–1999)

Tropicana Pattern (1999–2000)

Giant Teapot (1999)

StorAge Display Cabinet (1999)

Delta Giant Sugar Shaker (1999)

The Couple Wall Mask (2001)

Unnamed Prototype Charger (8 June 2001)

"Wedding Cake" (2002)

Flora Vase (2002)

Fantasia Coffee Pot (2003)

Legends of the 20th Century (2005–2006)

Mogsy the Cat (Kitty Katz range) (2006)

Hamil Road Pattern on Wedge Teapot (2006)
