= Graham MacGregor Bull =

Afro-British Physician and Nephrologist

- Born: 30 January 1918; Nyaung Hia, Burma, British India
- Died: 14 November 1987 (aged 69)
- Occupation(s): Physician, nephrologist, administrator
- Known for: Bull regimen, a dietary therapy used in kidney failure
- Spouse: Megan Patricia Jones
- Children: 4

Sir Graham MacGregor Bull FRCP (30 January 1918 – 14 November 1987) was a South African-British physician, nephrologist, medical administrator, and director of medical research.

== Biography ==
Graham MacGregor Bull grew up in South Africa. After education at Cape Town's Diocesan College, he attended the University of Cape Town, where he graduated MB ChB in 1939. After briefly engaging in general practice, he was appointed tutor and medical assistant at the Groote Schuur Hospital.

In 1947, the South African Council for Scientific and Industrial Research awarded him a travelling fellowship, enabling him to study in London at the Hammersmith Hospital's Royal Postgraduate Medical School, where he graduated MD in 1947 with thesis Postural Proteinuria.

Cardiologist Sir John McMichael appointed him to a lectureship at the school of medicine in Hammersmith. Shortly after the end of WWII, Willem Johan Kolff, the famous pioneer of hemodialysis, donated artificial kidney machines to institutions in Poland, as well as Amsterdam and London. Kolff briefly worked at Hammersmith to set up an artificial kidney machine with the rheumatologist Eric Bywaters and the nephrologist A. Mark 'Jo' Joekes. Bull joined the team of Bywaters and Joekes working on renal therapies. When Bywaters left in 1947 to become a medical director in Buckinghamshire, Bull became the leader of the renal unit at Hammersmith.

With Joekes and K G Lowe, he evaluated kidney function in acute tubular necrosis and proceeded to develop a conservative form of treatment, the ‘Bull regimen’, for use in the acute phase of kidney failure. In simple terms this involved measuring and replacing fluid and electrolytes lost by the patients to keep them in balance until natural recovery could take place. This resulted in an immediate reduction in what had previously been a high mortality rate.

Bull was appointed in 1952 to a professorial chair of medicine at Queen's University, Belfast (that institution's first such professorship). He directed the establishment of record linking systems among hospitals and general practitioners and also supported Belfast's flying ambulance service for heart attack victims. He helped to establish a department of medical statistics and served as chair of the Northern Ireland Hospital Authority's committees for medical education and research.

In 1955, he delivered the Goulstonian Lectures on The Uræmias.

Bull was appointed in 1966 director of the Medical Research Council’s new clinical research centre at Northwick Park in northwest London. He served on several committees for medical advice and investigation. In 1970 he became a member of the executive council of the Ciba Foundation and was a trustee from 1979 until his death.

Bull was elected FRCP in 1954 and was knighted in 1976. He retired in 1978. In 1988 the Sir Graham Bull Memorial Prize was founded at the Royal College of Physicians.

He had married a fellow medical graduate of the University of Cape Town, Megan Patricia Jones, who herself had a distinguished career, as medical officer and later governor at Holloway women’s prison, from 1966–1982. Lady Bull’s work there was recognised by her being appointed OBE; a photograph of her is in the archive of the National Portrait Gallery.

== Family ==
Graham and Megan Bull had four children: a daughter who became a consulting paediatric cardiologist, and three sons who became, respectively, an accountant, a zoologist and a musician.

== Bull regime ==
J. G. G. Borst in Amsterdam and Bull and his colleagues in London based their dietary therapy on 3 principles: (1) restrict the patient's intake of fluid to precisely balance the patient's output of fluid; (2) eliminate the patient's dietary protein and provide adequate calories to reduce the patient's endogenous breakdown of proteins; (3) give the patient no electrolytes except to replace known losses. Bull achieved these 3 objectives by feeding the patient a carefully measured, synthetic 'diet' consisting of glucose, peanut oil, and water.

Calculating fluid intake so that it does not exceed insensible loss plus urine output, is probably the most important part of the 'Bull regime'. An individual calculation is made for each patient to allow for variation in body build, pyrexia, and extra-renal losses, but the average permissible intake during complete anuria is 500 ml. per 24 hours.
