= Brian Scarlett =

English particle technologist

Brian Scarlett FREng FInstP
- Born: 11 July 1938; Biddulph, Staffordshire, England
- Died: 2 September 2004 (aged 66); Gainesville, Florida, United States

Academic background
- Education: Durham University (BSc, MSc)
- Thesis: The Effective Thermal Conductivity of Packed Beds of Metal Powder (1964)

Academic work
- Discipline: Particle technology
- Institutions: Loughborough University; Delft University of Technology; University of Florida

Brian Scarlett (11 July 1938 – 2 September 2004) was an English physicist and academic specialising in particle technology.

== Early life and education ==
Scarlett was born on 11 July 1938 in Biddulph, Staffordshire, England. He attended Wolstanton Grammar School and the University of Durham, graduating with a BSc in physics in 1959. He completed a M.Sc. degree from the same institution in 1964.

== Career ==
In 1964, he joined the United Kingdom Atomic Energy Authority, and was based at Chapelcross nuclear power station in Annan. Two years later he obtained a research assistantship at the Nottingham and District Technical College, where he was first introduced to the subject of particle technology. He moved to the Department of Chemical Engineering at Loughborough University of Technology in 1969, becoming leader of the particle technology group and senior lecturer.

While at Loughborough, Scarlett served as a local councillor for Charnwood District Council and was appointed to represent Leicestershire County Council on the Trent River Authority, where he rose to the position of Chairman of Water Management. He contemplated a full-time career in politics, but decided to stay as an academic.

In 1983, Scarlett was appointed professor of chemical technology at Delft University of Technology. His inaugural lecture set out his conception of particle technology as a multidisciplinary field, emphasising the importance of particle characterisation and the standardisation of particle-analysis techniques. He led a large research group at Delft, supervising around 50 doctoral and nearly 150 master's and engineering theses.

In 1990, he moved to the University of Florida as full professor in the National Science Foundation Engineering Research Centre, in particle science and technology, forming the largest academic group in powder mechanics in the US.

Scarlett was also involved in developing standards for particle measurement and served as chairman of the ISO technical committee concerned with particle characterisation. During his career, he produced around 350 publications and conference presentations.

== Personal life ==
Scarlett's dress sense was "very conservative" and, despite the hot climate, he exclusively wore suits and ties during his period working at the University of Florida.

Scarlett died on 2 September 2004 in Gainesville, Florida. He was survived by his wife Joan, son Ian, and daughters Diane and Judy.

== Honours ==
Scarlett was a Fellow of the Royal Academy of Engineering, a Fellow of the Institute of Physics, and a Fellow of the Institution of Chemical Engineers. He was awarded honorary doctorates (DSc) by the University of Coimbra (1997) and Loughborough University (1999).

== Selected publications ==
=== Book chapters ===
- Scarlett, Brian (1996). "Characterization of Particles and Powders". In Brook, R. J. (ed.). Materials Science and Technology: A Comprehensive Treatment. Processing of Ceramics, Part 1. Vol. 17A. Weinheim: VCH. pp. 99–125. ISBN 978-3-527-26830-6.

=== Journal articles ===
- Scarlett, Brian; Todd, A. C. (1968). "The critical porosity of free-flowing solids". Chemical Engineering Science. 23 (10): 1175–1182.
- ——— (1984). "Particle Technology – Manipulating the Divided". Particle & Particle Systems Characterization. 1 (1–4): 1–6. doi:10.1002/ppsc.19840010101.
- ——— (1992). "The characterization of particle shape". Particulate Science and Technology. 10 (3–4): 167–179.
