= Robert Latham (editor) =

British academic (1912–1995)

Robert Clifford Latham (11 March 1912 – 4 January 1995) was Fellow and Pepys Librarian of Magdalene College, Cambridge, and joint editor of The Diary of Samuel Pepys (1970–83).

== Early life and education ==
Latham was born on 11 March 1912 in Audley, Staffordshire. He was educated at Wolstanton Grammar School, Newcastle-under-Lyme, Staffordshire (now The Orme Academy) and Queens' College, Cambridge, where he received a double First Class Honours Degree in history.

== Academic career ==
In 1935 he was appointed an Assistant Lecturer at King's College London, and in 1939 a Lecturer. He was Reader in History (1947–1972) and Dean of Men (1965–1968) at Royal Holloway College, University of London, during the introduction of male undergraduates. In the academic year 1968–69 he was Professor of History at the University of Toronto.

From 1970 to 1972 he was Research Fellow, from 1972 to 1984 Fellow, and from 1984 to 1994 Hon. Fellow of Magdalene College, Cambridge, where, as Pepys Librarian from 1972 to 1982, he had charge of the remarkable collection of books, prints and manuscripts which Samuel Pepys had left to his old college.

Beginning in 1950, he devoted the greater part of his life to the study and editing of Pepys' diary. His work, undertaken in collaboration with Professor Willam Matthews of UCLA, was eventually published as The Diary of Samuel Pepys: a new and complete transcription in nine volumes, along with two separate Index and Companion volumes, in 1970–83. Latham's second wife, Linnet, assisted him with the compilation of the Index and Companion volumes: the Index volume alone ran to some 900 pages. Latham described the edition as "the first [...] in which the entire text was printed and a comprehensive commentary published". It included the erotic passages omitted in the edition of 1893–99 by H. B. Wheatley which "could hardly have been published in Victorian England without causing offence". In 1983 he was awarded the Wheatley Medal for the index by the Society of Indexers.

The Diary was described in a Times review by Bernard Levin as "the absolutely complete and unimprovably definitive edition [...] so exceptional that it can be said to have set new standards of scholarship".

In 1985 Latham also published a single-volume edition of selections from the diaries, under the title The Shorter Pepys.

== Honours ==
Latham was appointed a CBE in 1973; and was elected a Fellow of the British Academy in 1982.

== Personal life ==
Latham married Eileen Ramsay in 1939 (died 1969), with whom he had a son and daughter. In 1973 he married Rosalind ("Linnet") Birley, who died in 1990 (suicide). His son is Sir David Latham QC, who has served as Chairman of the Parole Board for England and Wales.

Latham died on 4 January 1995 in Cambridge, aged 82.
