= List of public art in Angus =

Map of Scotland with the Angus council area highlighted

This is a list of public art in Angus, one of the 32 local government council areas of Scotland. This list applies only to works of public art on permanent display in an outdoor public space and does not, for example, include artworks in museums.

== Arbroath ==
Image	Title / subject	Location and coordinates	Date	Artist / designer	Type	Material	Dimensions	Designation	Wikidata	Notes
	War memorial	St Vigeans Church, Arbroath	1920	FK Easton (Builder)	Celtic cross on pedestal	Granite				
More images	War memorial	The High Common, Arbroath	1922	George Washington Browne	Cenotaph	Sandstone				
	Robert Burns	The Library, Arbroath		Scott Sutherland	Statue on pedestal	Sandstone				

== Auchterhouse ==
Image	Title / subject	Location and coordinates	Date	Artist / designer	Type	Material	Dimensions	Designation	Wikidata	Notes
	War memorial	Auchterhouse	1920		Column with horse trough	Granite and cast iron		Category C	Q56616239	

== Brechin ==
Image	Title / subject	Location and coordinates	Date	Artist / designer	Type	Material	Dimensions	Designation	Wikidata	Notes
	War memorial	Brechin Park, Brechin	1923	J Kinross	Pillar on plinth	Stone				
	Robert Watson-Watt	Brechin	2014	Alan Herriot	Statue on pedestal	Bronze on stone				

== Carmyllie ==
Image	Title / subject	Location and coordinates	Date	Artist / designer	Type	Material	Dimensions	Designation	Wikidata	Notes
	War memorial	Greystone Road, Carmyllie			Obelisk	Stone				

== Carnoustie ==
Image	Title / subject	Location and coordinates	Date	Artist / designer	Type	Material	Dimensions	Designation	Wikidata	Notes
More images	War memorial	Memorial Park, Carnoustie	1921	Thomas Beattie	Statue on pedestal with pillars and surround	Stone				

== Craigo ==
Image	Title / subject	Location and coordinates	Date	Artist / designer	Type	Material	Dimensions	Designation	Wikidata	Notes
	War memorial	Craigo			Celtic wheel cross	Stone				

== Farnell ==
Image	Title / subject	Location and coordinates	Date	Artist / designer	Type	Material	Dimensions	Designation	Wikidata	Notes
	War memorial	Farnell		Willie Lamb of Montrose	Pillar	Granite				

== Kirkton of Glenisla ==
Image	Title / subject	Location and coordinates	Date	Artist / designer	Type	Material	Dimensions	Designation	Wikidata	Notes
	War memorial	Kirkton of Glenisla	c.1920s		Beehive cairn with cross	Stone				

== Kirriemuir ==
Image	Title / subject	Location and coordinates	Date	Artist / designer	Type	Material	Dimensions	Designation	Wikidata	Notes
	War memorial	Kirriemuir cemetery, Kirriemuir	1923		Statue on pillar	Stone				
More images	Peter Pan	Kirriemuir			Statue on pedestal	Bronze and stone				
	Circle of Time	Kirriemuir	2000	Bruce Walker	Abstract sculpture	Stone				

== Lunan ==
Image	Title / subject	Location and coordinates	Date	Artist / designer	Type	Material	Dimensions	Designation	Wikidata	Notes
More images	Lunan School War Memorial	Parish Church, Lunan	1921	Gibb Brothers (Makers)	Celtic cross	Granite				

== Menmuir ==
Image	Title / subject	Location and coordinates	Date	Artist / designer	Type	Material	Dimensions	Designation	Wikidata	Notes
	War memorial	Menmuir	1921		Pillar with sculpture	Stone				

== Monifieth ==
Image	Title / subject	Location and coordinates	Date	Artist / designer	Type	Material	Dimensions	Designation	Wikidata	Notes
	War memorial	Maule Street, Monifieth	1921	Joseph Hermon Cawthra (Sculptor), Charles Soutar (Architect)	Obelisk with sculpture	Stone and bronze		Category B	Q17779629	

== Montrose ==
Image	Title / subject	Location and coordinates	Date	Artist / designer	Type	Material	Dimensions	Designation	Wikidata	Notes
More images	Robert Peel	High Street, Montrose	1852		Statue on pedestal	Stone		Category B	Q17780451	
More images	Joseph Hume	High Street, Montrose	1859	William Calder Marshall	Statue on pedestal	Stone		Category B	Q17780446	
More images	Robert Burns	Academy Square, Montrose	c.1882	William Birnie Rhind	Statue on pedestal	Stone		Category B	Q17769904	
More images	War memorial	Mid Links, Montrose	1920, additions 1924 & 1947	Henry Snell Gamley (sculptor), John Kinross (architect)	Statue on pedestal, surround and panels	Bronze and stone		Category C	Q77774635	Additions by HS Gamley and George Washington Browne (1924), William Lamb (1947)
	Bill the Smith	High Street, Montrose	1937	William Lamb	Statue	Bronze				
	The Minesweeper	Traill Drive, Montrose		William Lamb	Statue	Bronze			Q91215284	
	The Seafarer	Wharf Street, Montrose	1938, erected 1978	William Lamb	Statue on pedestal	Bronze and stone			Q91219293	
	The Whisper	Montrose Library, Montrose		William Lamb	Sculpture	Stone			Q91222578	
More images	James Graham, 1st Marquess of Montrose	Castle Street, Montrose	2000		Statue on pedestal	Metal				
More images	Bamse	The Quay, Wharf Street, Montrose	2006	Alan Herriot	Statue on plinth	Bronze and stone				

== Tarfside ==
Image	Title / subject	Location and coordinates	Date	Artist / designer	Type	Material	Dimensions	Designation	Wikidata	Notes
	War memorial	Tarfside			Tapering blockwork pillar	Stone				

== Tealing ==
Image	Title / subject	Location and coordinates	Date	Artist / designer	Type	Material	Dimensions	Designation	Wikidata	Notes
	War memorial	Tealing	c.1920		Cross on pillar	Stone		Category C	Q56622871	
