= List of Category A listed buildings in Angus =

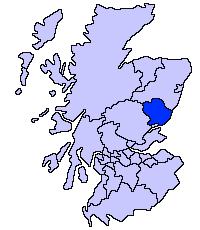
Angus shown within Scotland

This is a list of Category A listed buildings in Angus, Scotland.

In Scotland, the term listed building refers to a building or other structure officially designated as being of "special architectural or historic interest". Category A structures are those considered to be "buildings of national or international importance, either architectural or historic, or fine little-altered examples of some particular period, style or building type." Listing was begun by a provision in the Town and Country Planning (Scotland) Act 1947, and the current legislative basis for listing is the Planning (Listed Buildings and Conservation Areas) (Scotland) Act 1997. The authority for listing rests with Historic Scotland, an executive agency of the Scottish Government, which inherited this role from the Scottish Development Department in 1991. Once listed, severe restrictions are imposed on the modifications allowed to a building's structure or its fittings. Listed building consent must be obtained from local authorities prior to any alteration to such a structure. There are approximately 47,400 listed buildings in Scotland, of which around 8% (some 3,800) are Category A.

The council area of Angus covers 2,182 square kilometres (842 sq mi), and has a population of around 110,300. There are 95 Category A listed buildings in the area.

== Listed buildings ==
Name	Location	Date listed	Geo-coordinates	Notes	LB number	Image
Airlie Parish Kirk	Airlie		56°39′02″N 3°07′18″W	18th-century church	4621	Upload another image See more images
Barry Mill	Barry	11 November 2009	56°30′16″N 2°45′31″W	A water-powered, working meal mill	4649	Upload another image See more images
Careston Castle	Careston		56°43′42″N 2°46′07″W	Late-16th-century tower house with later additions	4656	Upload another image See more images
Bridge of Dun	Near House of Dun, over the River South Esk, Montrose		56°42′59″N 2°33′09″W	Three-arch stone bridge, completed 1787 by Alexander Stevens	4677	Upload another image See more images
House of Dun	Montrose		56°43′46″N 2°32′25″W	Country house by William Adam, circa 1730	4691	Upload another image See more images
House of Dun court of offices	Montrose		56°43′46″N 2°32′28″W	By William Adam, circa 1730	4692	Upload another image See more images
St. Vigeans Parish Kirk	St Vigeans, Arbroath		56°34′36″N 2°35′25″W	12th- and 15th-century church, restored in 1871 by Robert Rowand Anderson	4770	Upload another image See more images
Melgund Castle	Aberlemno		56°41′47″N 2°44′34″W	Later 16th-century tower house	4931	Upload another image See more images
Usan House	Kirkton of Craig, Montrose		56°41′17″N 2°27′19″W	Classical mansion of 1820	4964	Upload another image See more images
Dunninald Castle	Kirkton of Craig, Montrose	1971	56°40′45″N 2°29′08″W	Tudor-Gothic castellated mansion by James Gillespie Graham, 1824	4972	Upload another image See more images
Kirk Tower House	Kirkton Of Craig, Montrose		56°41′34″N 2°29′07″W	Former church built 1799, the earliest Gothic Revival church to be built in Scotland	4979	Upload another image See more images
Craig House	Kirkton Of Craig, Montrose		56°41′49″N 2°29′13″W	17th-century L-plan house	4984	Upload Photo
Craig House - Entrance Gateway	Kirkton Of Craig, Montrose		56°41′48″N 2°29′10″W	16th-century defensive gateway	4985	Upload Photo
Kintrockat House	Brechin		56°43′19″N 2°42′25″W	Early-19th-century house	5011	Upload Photo
Ardovie House	Ardovie, Brechin		56°41′54″N 2°39′57″W	18th-century country house	5016	Upload Photo
Brechin Castle	Brechin		56°43′44″N 2°39′32″W	Early-18th-century mansion with 19th-century remodelling	5030	Upload another image See more images
Stannochy Bridge	Over the River South Esk near Brechin		56°43′19″N 2°40′54″W	Single-arch stone bridge dated 1825, possibly by Robert Stevenson	5042	Upload another image See more images
Auchterhouse Old Mansion House	Auchterhouse		56°31′22″N 3°05′20″W	17th-century mansion with 18th- and 19th-century additions, now a hotel	5689	Upload another image See more images
Auchterhouse Old Mansion House, Dovecot	Auchterhouse		56°31′24″N 3°05′14″W	17th-century dovecote	5690	Upload Photo
Balruddery, East Gates	Balruddery House, Liff		56°28′25″N 3°06′25″W	Gateway designed by David Neave in 1820 for Balruddery House, now demolished	10854	Upload another image
Gallery	Marykirk		56°46′51″N 2°32′11″W	17th- and 18th-century country house	11165	Upload Photo
Upper North Water Bridge	Over River North Esk near Marykirk	Delisted	56°47′08″N 2°34′12″W	16th-century three-arch stone bridge, rebuilt in the 19th century (Note: Also in Aberdeenshire, as it crosses the River North Esk which is the council boundary)	11170	Upload another image See more images
Marykirk Bridge	Over River North Esk at Marykirk		56°46′32″N 2°30′56″W	Four-arch stone bridge by Robert Stevenson, 1814	11177	Upload Photo
Marykirk Bridge, Tollhouse	Marykirk		56°46′31″N 2°30′58″W	Single-storey toll house by Robert Stevenson, 1814	11178	Upload Photo
Edzell Castle	Edzell	Delisted	56°48′42″N 2°40′55″W	Remains of 16th-century castle with 17th-century additions and formal garden	11257	Upload another image See more images
Red Castle - Enceinte	Lunan		56°39′02″N 2°30′39″W	13th-century defensive wall	11273	Upload another image See more images
Red Castle - Keep	Lunan		56°39′02″N 2°30′39″W	Ruins of 15th-century tower house	11274	Upload another image See more images
Ethie Castle	Inverkeilor		56°36′45″N 2°30′39″W	15th-century tower house with later additions, altered in 1892 by Robert Rowand Anderson	11278	Upload another image See more images
Invermark Castle	Glen Mark		56°54′41″N 2°55′03″W	Early-16th-century tower house with 17th-century additions	11349	Upload another image See more images
Restenneth Priory	Forfar	Not listed	56°39′12″N 2°50′46″W	Ruins of 13th-century Romanesque church and monastery	11386	Upload another image See more images
Baldovie Farmhouse	Kirkton of Kingoldrum		56°40′25″N 3°06′15″W	Late-17th-century Renaissance mansion	11417	Upload Photo
Farnell Parish Kirk	Farnell		56°41′21″N 2°36′36″W	Gothic Revival church of 1806	11497	Upload another image See more images
Farnell Castle	Farnell		56°41′23″N 2°36′54″W	Medieval residence of the Bishops of Brechin, altered in the 16th century	11501	Upload Photo
Strathmore Aisle	Glamis		56°36′34″N 3°00′04″W	15th-century aisle of demolished church, later altered, with burial monuments of Lords of Glamis	11556	Upload Photo
Inverquharity Castle	Kirriemuir		56°42′34″N 2°57′48″W	15th-century tower house	11665	Upload another image See more images
Mains of Rochelhill Dovecot	Charleston		56°35′38″N 3°01′10″W	Lectern dovecote dated 1713	11670	Upload another image See more images
Glamis Castle	Glamis		56°37′13″N 3°00′09″W	15th-century tower house with 17th-, 18th- and 19th-century ranges, seat of the Earl of Strathmore and Kinghorne	11701	Upload another image See more images
Glamis Castle sundial	Glamis		56°37′11″N 3°00′06″W	Later 17th-century faceted sundial	11705	Upload another image See more images
Glamis Castle dovecot	Glamis		56°36′48″N 3°00′18″W	Earlier 17th-century lectern dovecot	11710	Upload another image See more images
Pitmuies Home Farm	Guthrie		56°38′18″N 2°42′27″W	Late-18th-century farmstead with horse mill	11875	Upload Photo
Gardyne Castle	Friockheim		56°37′44″N 2°41′47″W	16th-century L-plan tower house with later additions	11914	Upload another image See more images
Mains of Edzell Doocot	Edzell		56°48′41″N 2°40′31″W	Turreted dovecote of circa 1600	12385	Upload another image
Pitmuies House	Guthrie		56°38′16″N 2°42′26″W	Later 18th-century mansion	13076	Upload another image See more images
Lundie Parish Church	Lundie		56°30′58″N 3°09′16″W	Medieval Romanesque church, rebuilt 19th century, and Duncan family mausoleum by Robert Mylne	13090	Upload another image See more images
Fowlis Easter Parish Church	Fowlis, Liff		56°29′18″N 3°06′09″W	15th-century church	13144	Upload another image See more images
Balintore Castle	10 kilometres (6.2 mi) north-west of Kirriemuir		56°43′03″N 3°09′40″W	Derelict Baronial mansion, 1860 by William Burn	13757	Upload another image See more images
Tealing Parish Church	Tealing		56°31′47″N 2°58′17″W	Early-19th-century former church, incorporating several sculpted stones within its walls	17450	Upload another image See more images
South Balluderon Farm	Tealing		56°31′50″N 3°01′00″W	Unaltered farm buildings and mill dating to circa 1800	17458	Upload Photo
Pitscandly House	Forfar		56°39′42″N 2°50′35″W	Late-17th-century mansion	17657	Upload Photo
Balnamoon House sundial	Balnamoon House, near Brechin		56°45′45″N 2°44′07″W	Lectern sundial circa 1700	17700	Upload Photo
House of Kinnaber	Montrose		56°44′48″N 2°27′01″W	L-plan mansion dated 1680	17762	Upload another image See more images
Stracathro House	Stracathro		56°46′48″N 2°36′51″W	Graeco-Roman mansion by Archibald Simpson, 1827	17803	Upload another image See more images
Stracathro House stables	Stracathro		56°46′49″N 2°37′03″W	Stable block by Archibald Simpson, 1827	17804	Upload Photo
Downie Park House	Kirriemuir		56°42′54″N 2°58′04″W	Country house circa 1805	18034	Upload Photo
Panmure Estate - The West Gate	Craigton		56°32′08″N 2°45′52″W	Renaissance-style gateway by Sir William Bruce, circa 1672	18418	Upload Photo
Panmure Estate, Commemorative Column	Craigton		56°32′25″N 2°45′13″W	50-foot (15 m) Renaissance column, commemorating the 1694 marriage of James Maule, 4th Earl of Panmure	18419	Upload another image
Tealing House Dovecot	Tealing	Delisted	56°31′54″N 2°57′22″W	16th-century gabled dovecote	18988	Upload another image See more images
Gagie House	Murroes		56°31′37″N 2°53′49″W	Early-17th-century fortified house with later additions	19001	Upload Photo
Gagie House, summerhouse	Murroes		56°31′37″N 2°53′48″W	18th-century Renaissance-style summer house	19004	Upload Photo
Murroes House	Murroes		56°30′15″N 2°52′37″W	16th-century tower house with 17th-century range, restored 1942	19011	Upload Photo
Arbroath Abbey - Abbey Church And Precincts	Arbroath		56°33′45″N 2°34′56″W	Ruins of church founded in 1176 by William the Lion	21130	Upload another image
Arbroath Abbey - Conventual Building	Arbroath		56°33′44″N 2°34′58″W	Ruins of 13th-century west range	21131	Upload another image
Arbroath Abbey - Pend	Arbroath		56°33′44″N 2°35′01″W	15th-century fortified gatehouse	21132	Upload another image
Arbroath Abbey - Regality Tower	Arbroath		56°33′44″N 2°35′02″W	13th-century keep	21133	Upload another image
Arbroath Abbey - Abbot's House	Arbroath		56°33′43″N 2°34′58″W	Partly 13th-century, the best surviving example of its type in Scotland	21134	Upload another image
Baltic Works	Arbroath, Dens Road		56°33′50″N 2°35′18″W	1852 linen factory, later a bonded warehouse	21141	Upload another image See more images
Bell Rock Lighthouse Signal Tower and Entrance Lodges	Arbroath, Lady Loan		56°33′17″N 2°35′11″W	Classical lodges and signal tower, built 1813 to communicate with the Bell Rock Lighthouse	21230	Upload another image See more images
The Elms	Arbroath, Cairnie Road		56°33′59″N 2°36′01″W	French Gothic mansion by William Leiper, 1869	21250	Upload Photo
Mortuary Chapel - Western Cemetery	Arbroath		56°33′59″N 2°36′44″W	Baronial chapel, built 1875 by Patrick Allan-Fraser	21252	Upload another image See more images
Hospitalfield	Arbroath		56°33′16″N 2°36′37″W	Mid 19th-century Baronial mansion by Patrick Allan-Fraser	21253	Upload another image See more images
Brechin Cathedral	Brechin		56°43′51″N 2°39′41″W	12th-century onwards, restored circa 1900 by John Honeyman	22439	Upload another image See more images
Round Tower at south west angle of Cathedral Church Lane	Brechin		56°43′51″N 2°39′41″W	11th-century round tower, 101 feet (31 m) high	22440	Upload another image See more images
25, 27 High Street	Brechin		56°43′54″N 2°39′35″W	18th-century town houses with shops below	22476	Upload Photo
68-74 High Street	Brechin		56°43′51″N 2°39′33″W	17th-century or earlier town houses with shops below	22505	Upload Photo
Maison Dieu Chapel	Brechin		56°43′59″N 2°39′39″W	Remains of 13th-century chapel	22508	Upload another image See more images
Baptist Church and Halls	Brechin, Panmure Street		56°44′01″N 2°39′27″W	19th-century church and hall, formerly West and St Columba's Parish Church	22522	Upload another image See more images
Brechin Bridge	Brechin, over River South Esk		56°43′24″N 2°38′53″W	Partly 13th-century, rebuilt in the 18th century	22549	Upload another image See more images
Southesk Church (Former Gardner Memorial Church)	Brechin		56°43′53″N 2°39′16″W	Mixed Romanesque and late Gothic, 1900 by John James Burnet	22568	Upload another image See more images
Municipal Buildings	Forfar, Castle Street		56°38′41″N 2°53′19″W	Built 1824 as Sheriff Court, by David Neave	31542	Upload another image See more images
Lowson Memorial Parish Church	Forfar		56°38′48″N 2°52′27″W	Scots Gothic church, 1914 by Alexander Marshall Mackenzie	31604	Upload another image See more images
St. Mary's Episcopal Church	Kirriemuir		56°40′37″N 3°00′29″W	Gothic revival church, 1905 by Ninian Comper	36899	Upload Photo
174 High Street (Holly House)	Montrose		56°42′39″N 2°28′07″W	17th- and 18th-century town house	38041	Upload Photo
190 High Street, The Retreat	Montrose		56°42′37″N 2°28′08″W	Early-18th-century town house	38046	Upload Photo
214 and 216 High Street, Public Library	Montrose		56°42′36″N 2°28′09″W	Carnegie Library, built 1905 in Baronial style by J. Lindsay Grant	38051	Upload another image See more images
Montrose Town House	Montrose, High Street		56°42′39″N 2°28′05″W	18th-century municipal buildings	38083	Upload another image See more images
Montrose Parish Church	Montrose, High Street		56°42′38″N 2°28′04″W	Late-18th-century church, with 19th-century spire by James Gillespie Graham	38084	Upload another image See more images
10 Castle Place, Straton House	Montrose		56°42′33″N 2°28′06″W	18th-century town house	38095	Upload Photo
Montrose Infirmary	Montrose		56°42′28″N 2°28′28″W	19th-century hospital building by James Collie	38112	Upload another image See more images
1-8 (inclusive nos) Panmure Terrace	Montrose		56°42′39″N 2°27′53″W	Mid 19th-century Classical terrace of eight houses	38195	Upload another image See more images
St Mary's and St Peter's Episcopal Church	Montrose		56°42′39″N 2°27′48″W	Mid 19th-century Gothic Revival church by John Henderson	38204	Upload another image See more images
Chapel Works	Montrose		56°42′38″N 2°27′40″W	Textile mills, 1833 with later additions, the largest mills in Angus outside Dundee	38212	Upload another image See more images
Montrose Air Station Building 48	Montrose Airfield		56°43′31″N 2°27′45″W	Unaltered military aircraft shed built 1914	38228	Upload another image
Bell Rock Lighthouse	Inchcape, offshore from Arbroath		56°25′58″N 2°23′17″W	Lighthouse built 1811 by Robert Stevenson	45197	Upload another image See more images
Logie Schoolhouse, Former U.F. Church	Logie		56°45′45″N 2°29′44″W	Later-18th- or early-19th-century vernacular school house, later used as a church	50209	Upload Photo

== See also ==
- Scheduled monuments in Angus
