= Montrose Town House =

Municipal building in Montrose, Scotland

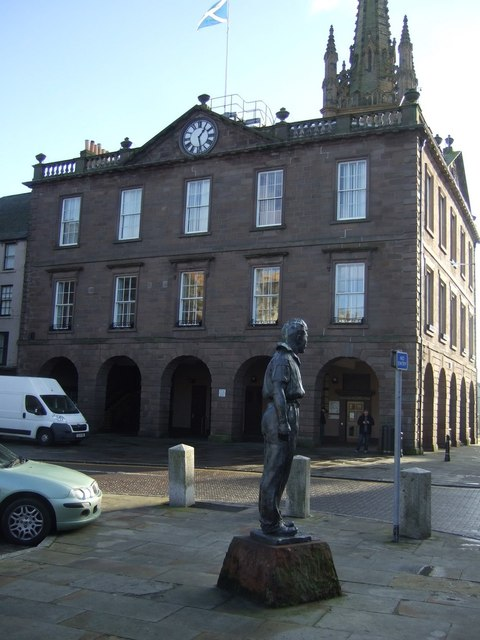
- Montrose Town House with "Bill the Smith" in the foreground

- Shown in Angus
- 56.7109°N 2.4681°W
- Location: High Street, Montrose

History
- Built: 1764

Site notes
- Architect: John Hutcheson
- Architectural style: Neoclassical style

Listed Building – Category A
- Official name: High Street, Town House
- Designated: 11 June 1971
- Reference no.: LB38083

Montrose Town House, also known as Montrose Guildhall, is a municipal building in the High Street, Montrose, Scotland. The building, which was the headquarters of Montrose Burgh Council, is a Category A listed building.

== History ==
The first municipal building in Montrose was a medieval tolbooth which stood in the middle of the High Street: (Note: The tolbooth continued to be used as a prison after the town house was completed and it was because of the appalling conditions in which mentally ill patients were held in the tolbooth that Susan Carnegie successfully campaigned for the creation of the Montrose Lunatic Asylum, Infirmary & Dispensary in the 1770s: the tolbooth was eventually demolished in 1837.) it was primarily used as a prison and, by the mid-18th century, the burgh leaders decided that the town needed a dedicated assembly room for civic events.

The building was designed by John Hutcheson in the neoclassical style, built in local stone and was completed in 1764. The design involved a symmetrical main frontage with five bays facing north along the High Street; it was originally just two storeys high but was increased in height and extended to the rear by a local builder, John Balfour, to a design by William Smith with funding from a local guild in 1818. The extension to the rear was erected on land which had previously formed part of the churchyard of Montrose Old and St Andrew's Church and so a crypt was built under the town house to avoid disturbing family vaults.

The enlarged building featured a rusticated loggia, for merchants to meet each other, on the ground floor, five sash windows with cornices, three of which were consoled, on the first floor and five plain sash windows on the second floor. At roof level, there was a balustrade and a pediment with a clock in the tympanum above the central three bays. Internally, the principal rooms were the courtroom at the back of the building on the first floor, the council chamber at the front of the building on the second floor and a guildhall for the local guild at the back of the building on the second floor.

The Montrose Library, which had been established in the town house in 1785, relocated to the museum buildings in 1898. The town house was refaced in ashlar stone in 1908, and continued to serve as the headquarters of the burgh council for much of the 20th century, but ceased to be the local seat of government when the enlarged Angus District Council was formed at County Buildings in Forfar in 1975. A sculpture by William Lamb entitled "Bill the Smith", which had been modelled on a blacksmith working at the steel fabrication yard of Harry Maiden in New Wynd, was unveiled outside the town house in 2001.

Works of art in the town house include a portrait by John Prescott Knight of the locally-born former Lord Mayor of London, Sir James Duke, which hangs in the council chamber.

== See also ==
- List of listed buildings in Montrose, Angus
- List of Category A listed buildings in Angus
