= Montrose Museum =

Museum in Montrose, Angus, Scotland

Coordinates: 56°42′37″N 2°27′56″W

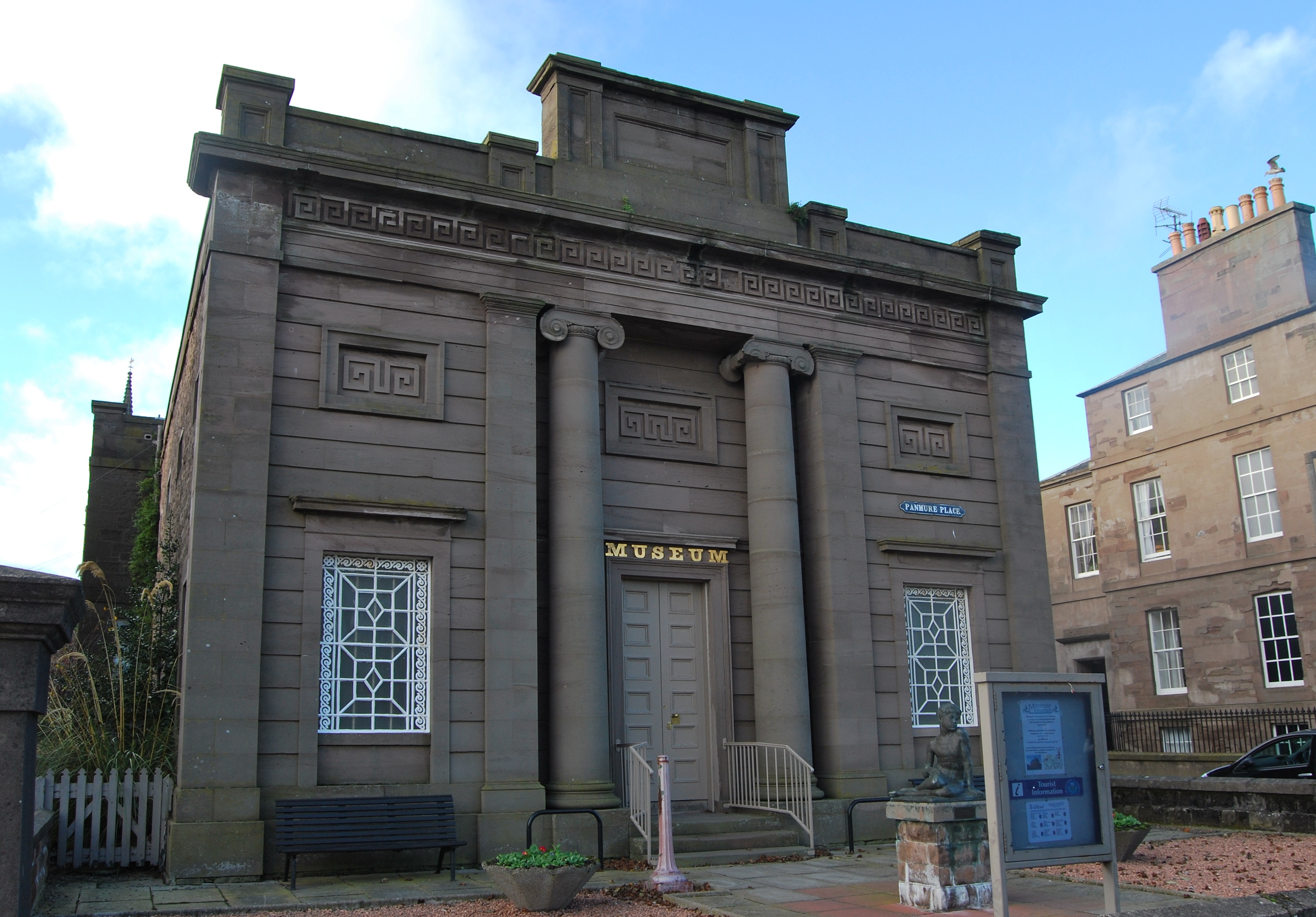
- Established: 1841
- Location: Panmure Place, Montrose, Angus, DD10 8HE
- Director: Angus Alive

Montrose Museum opened in 1842 in Montrose, Angus, Scotland. The museum came into being when in 1841 the Montrose Natural History and Antiquarian Society started a fund to expand its space; in order to house its curiosities and wonders ranging from geological and ethnographical artefacts to a collection of natural history objects and fine art. It was accredited by the Museums, Libraries and Archives Council in June 2009.

The history of the Burgh of Montrose is explored; afterwards featuring the life of James Graham, 1st Marquess of Montrose and his role in Scottish military history.

== The museum ==
From 1837 the collection was housed at a local school but in 1842 was moved into a purpose-built museum, one of the first of its kind in Scotland. The museum is built of pink sandstone in the neo-classical style, fronted by Ionic columns. Inside the collection is presented in a spacious atrium. From October 2009 it will undergo refurbishment and accessibility improvements and will reopen in 2010.

== The collection ==
The collection includes archaeological finds from the Neolithic and the Bronze Age; stones from what was the Pictish civilisation of Circinn but is now Angus; and the Inchbrayock Stone, also Pictish and dating from 850-950AD. Their collection contains 38 Ancient Egyptian relics and objects from Thebes. The history of the Burgh of Montrose is explored; afterwards featuring the life of James Graham, 1st Marquess of Montrose and his role in Scottish military history.

The adjoining art gallery has featured the work of local artists including William Lamb, Edward Baird, James Barclay, David Waterson, Malcolm McCoig, Rowena Comrie, Maurice Forsyth-Grant, Briony Anderson, Jackie Gardiner, Colin McPherson, Ingrid A. Fraser, Struan Hamilton, Bella Green, Fiona Turnbull and Hetty Haxworth as well as the work of the Original Art Group.

In the mezzanine above maritime relics illuminate the history of the east coast whaling industry. This sits alongside an impressive array of model boats. There is interesting taxidermy of local wildlife and a small geology display with a collection of semi-precious agate stones, in a darkened room at the top of the building.

== The Community ==
There are regular children's activities as well as occasional afternoon talks and evening events. The museum often features work by local groups in its art gallery.

In 2008 the Amici Wind Quintet from the Royal Scottish Academy of Music and Drama appeared at the museum.
