= E. C. Shankland =

Scottish naval officer (c. 1880–1951)

Commander Ernest Claude Shankland RNR FRSE (c.1880 – 1951) was a 19th-century Scottish naval officer and harbour expert.

== Life ==
He was born in Montrose on the north-east Scottish coast.

His early life is unclear but it is presumed his father was "Ernest M. Shankland" running the Granton Hotel next to Granton Harbour in Edinburgh from 1890 and the father died around 1895, the hotel thereafter run by "Mrs Shankland". He was educated at George Watson's College then studied Navigation at Leith Nautical College.

He obtained a post with the Clan Line. In 1910 he joined the Royal Navy Reserve and stayed in their service until the end of the First World War. From 1922 to 1943 he held the critical post of River Superintendent and Chief Harbour Master of the Port of London Authority.

In 1930 he was elected a Fellow of the Royal Society of Edinburgh. His proposers were Arthur Crichton Mitchell, Brysson Cunningham, Sir James Alfred Ewing and David Alan Stevenson. He resigned in 1940.

He died on 16 December 1951 in Folkestone on the southern English coast.

== Publications ==
- Notes in the Fluctuation of Mean Sea Levels (1923)
- Modern Harbours (1926)
- Modern Harbour Conservancy and Operations (1926)
- Navigation from the Viking Period to the Present Day (1931)
- Dredging of Harbours and Rivers (1931)
- Marconi's Wireless Pilot (1934)
- How Ships Find Their Way: chapter 8 of Britain's Merchant Navy (1943)
