= Hercules Ross =

Scottish merchant (1745–1816)

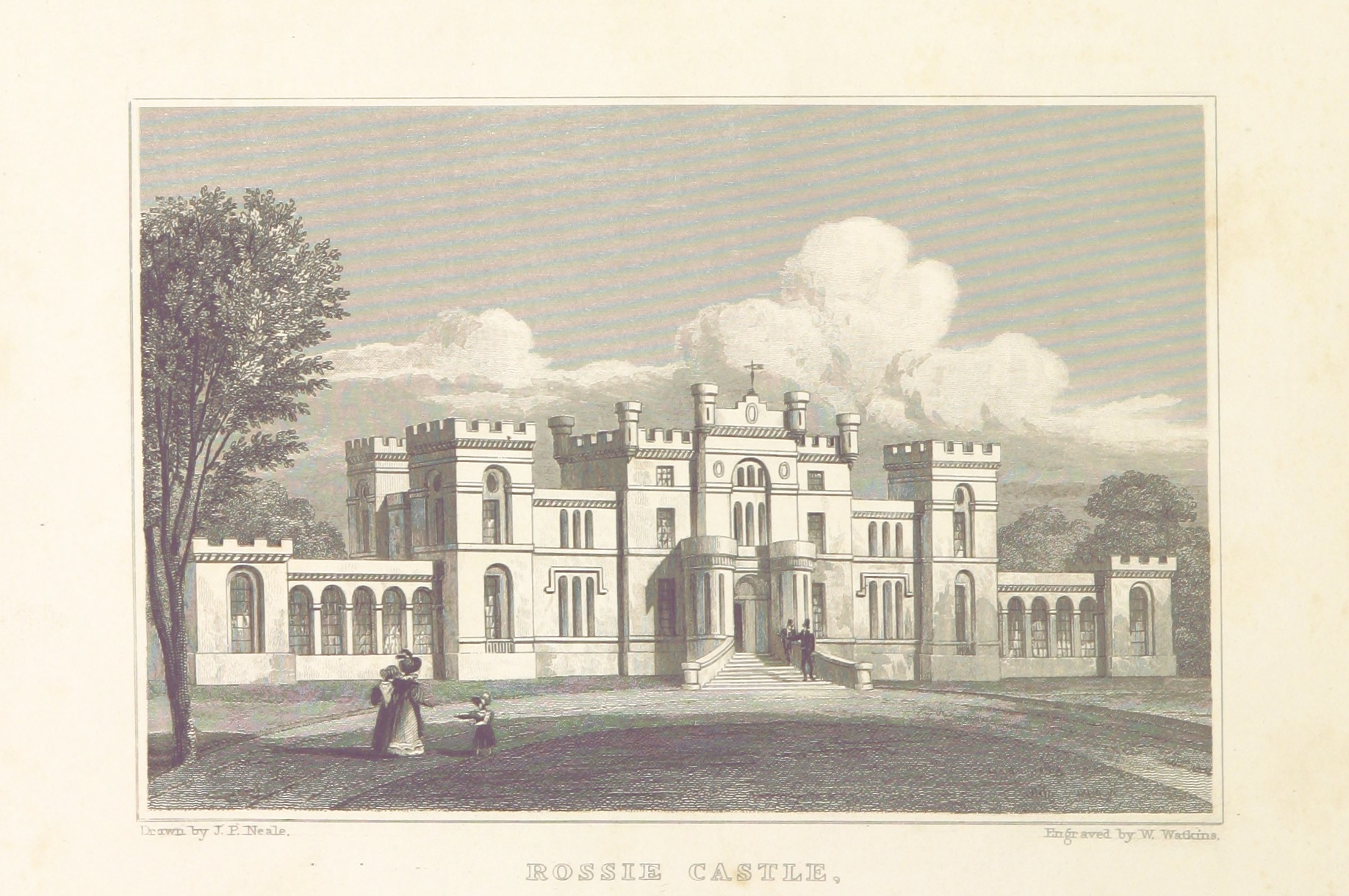
Rossie Castle

Hercules Ross (1745 – 25 December 1816) was a Scottish merchant, who made a fortune in Jamaica, became an intimate friend of Horatio Nelson and figured prominently, if briefly, in the campaign for the abolition of the slave trade. Fiona Scharlau characterises Ross as 'a supreme example of the poor boy who worked hard in a foreign country, creating a life of opportunities that lead to fulfillment of the rags-to-riches dream of the sojourner.' He ended his days at Rossie Castle, a large house which he had built on land acquired by him in Forfarshire.

== Origins ==
He was the ninth son of John Ross (fifth son to a second wife, Elizabeth Fullarton), an excise officer in Port Glasgow of narrow means and a probable descendant (via the Rosses of Kirkland and Tartraven) from Ninian Ross, 3rd Lord Ross.

== Career in the West Indies ==
In 1761 he travelled to Jamaica, where he established himself successfully as a trader, naval prize agent and privateer shipowner and made the acquaintance of Nelson. He acquired a Jamaican mistress, Elizabeth Foord, a quadroon slave whom he later freed and by whom he had several children. One of their sons, Daniel Ross (1780-1849), later became a leading marine surveyor with the Bombay Marine, a Fellow of the Royal Society and President of the Bombay Geographical Society.

== Return to Scotland ==
In 1782, with his fortune made, Ross returned to Scotland, leaving behind Elizabeth Foord, who had been left with sufficient funds to open what became a prosperous boarding house. Upon his return he was elected an Honorary Burgess of Glasgow and purchased an estate at Rossie, near Montrose, on which he later built a large house, Rossie Castle. In 1784, he married Henrietta Parish, the daughter of John Parish, a banker with extensive business interests in Hamburg.

== Evidence against the slave trade ==
In 1790, Ross embarked on a correspondence with William Wilberforce, which led to his giving evidence before the Select Committee of the House of Commons in support of the abolition of the slave trade. Thomas Clarkson ended his History of the Rise, Progress and Accomplishment of the Abolition of the African Slave-Trade by the British Parliament in this manner:

Having now mentioned the principal facts contained in the evidence offered to Parliament by the petitioners of Great Britain, in behalf of the abolition of the slave trade, we cannot close this compilation better than in the words of Mr Hercules Ross: he says, “finally, as the result of his observations and most serious reflection, he hesitates not to say, that the trade for slaves ought to be abolished, not only as contrary to sound policy, but to the laws of God and nature; and were it possible, by the present inquiry, to convey a just knowledge of the extensive misery it occasions, every Kingdom of Europe must unite in calling on their legislatures to abolish the human traffic

The evidence of Ross, as a former member of the planter society whose basis he now condemned, was considered of particular benefit and he was in consequence made an honorary and corresponding member of the Society for the Abolition of the Slave Trade.

== Personal and family life ==
As a result of the part he played in the debate over the slave trade, Ross unsurprisingly found that he was no longer persona grata with a number of acquaintances from his former Kingston days; however, he drew consolation from his continuing friendship with Lord Nelson, who became godfather to his son Horatio Ross (1801-1886). Horatio became a celebrated sportsman, being the best rifle shot of his day, and a pioneer photographer. Two of Hercules Ross's younger sons emigrated to the United States in the late 1790s, settling in Pennsylvania.

Hercules Ross died on 25 December 1816, his wife having died in 1811 at the age of 43. His son Horatio, who was at that point only 15 years old, inherited his estate.

== Sources ==
- Hercules Ross of Kingston, Jamaica and Rossie, Forfar (1745-1816) with a sketch of the career of Captain Daniel Ross F.R.S., Bombay Marine, later Indian Navy (1780-1849) - Unpublished thesis [1982] by Agnes Butterfield, M.A. Oxford and Manchester. 128 pages; copy available in Montrose Public Library.
- Thomas Clarkson's History of the Rise, Progress and Accomplishment of the Abolition of the African Slave-Trade by the British Parliament (1808)
- See also Dictionary of National Biography entry on Horatio Ross.
