= Farnell, Angus =

Coordinates: 56.690°N 2.612°W

Farnell
- Location within Angus
- OS grid reference: NO626555
- Council area: Angus
- Lieutenancy area: Angus
- Country: Scotland
- Sovereign state: United Kingdom
- Post town: BRECHIN
- Postcode district: DD9
- Dialling code: 01356
- Police: Scotland
- Fire: Scottish
- Ambulance: Scottish
- UK Parliament: Angus
- Scottish Parliament: North Tayside

Farnell (Scots pronunciation: [ˈfɑrnəl]) is a village in Angus, Scotland. It lies 2 miles south of the River South Esk, between Brechin and Montrose, near Kinnaird Castle.

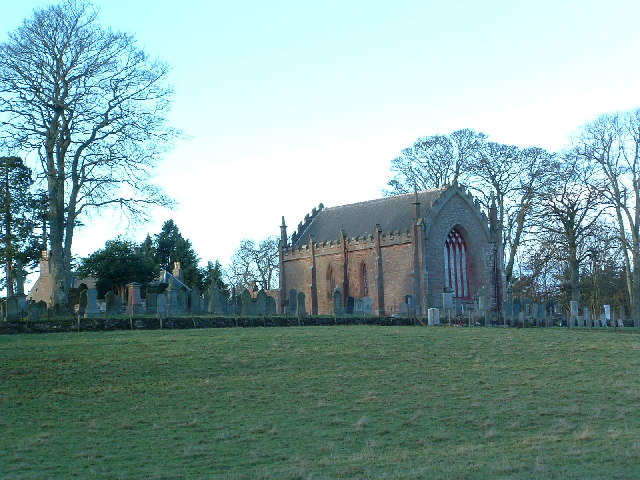
Farnell Church
