= St Vigeans Church =

- St Vigeans Parish Church, Arbroath
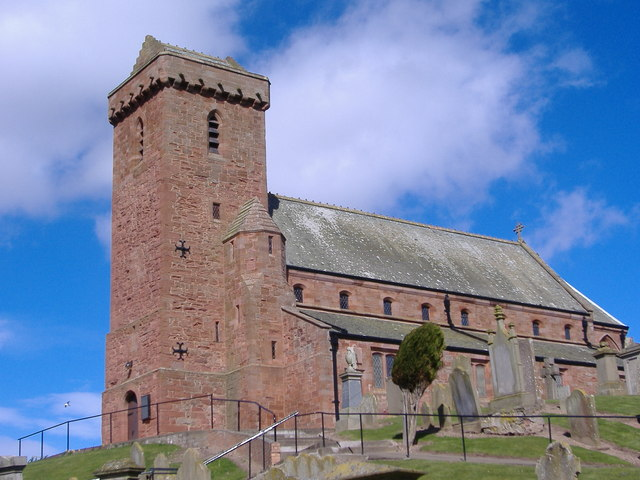

- Location within Angus
- 56.57675°N 2.59029°W
- Location: Arbroath, Angus
- Country: Scotland
- Denomination: Church of Scotland
- Website: www.stvigeanschurch.org

History
- Status: Parish church
- Dedication: Saint Fechin

Architecture
- Functional status: Active
- Heritage designation: Category A listed building

St Vigeans Church is a Church of Scotland parish church, serving the parish of the ancient village of St Vigeans on the outskirts of Arbroath, Angus, Scotland. The church was rebuilt in the 12th century but not consecrated until 1242 by David de Bernham, Bishop of St Andrews. The church underwent some alteration in the 15th century, but suffered very little change following the Scottish Reformation of 1560. A major restoration was carried out in 1871 by the Scottish Victorian architect Robert Rowand Anderson.

== See also ==
- List of Church of Scotland parishes
- List of Category A listed buildings in Angus
