= Ardovie =

Coordinates: 56.697537°N 2.666199°W

- Location within Angus
- OS grid reference: NO593564
- Council area: Angus
- Lieutenancy area: Angus
- Country: Scotland
- Sovereign state: United Kingdom
- Post town: BRECHIN
- Postcode district: DD9
- Dialling code: 01356
- Police: Scotland
- Fire: Scottish
- Ambulance: Scottish
- UK Parliament: Angus
- Scottish Parliament: Angus North and Mearns

Ardovie is a settlement on the perimeter of Montreathmont Moor, 3 miles south of Brechin.

== See also ==
- Brechin
