= Montrose Old and St Andrew's Church =

St Andrew's Church
- Old and St Andrew's Church
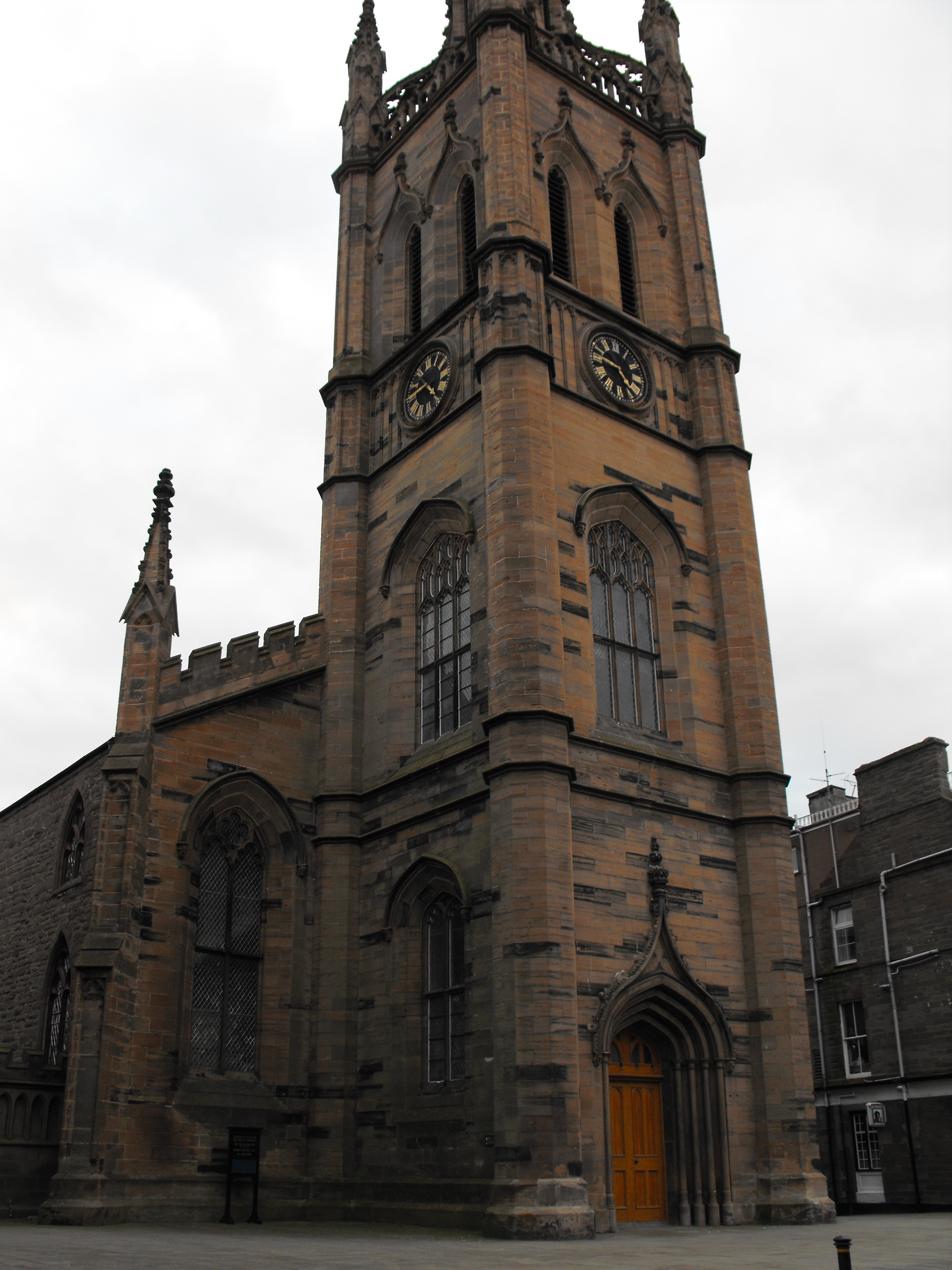

- Location within Angus
- 56.71051°N 2.468378°W
- Location: Montrose, Angus
- Country: Scotland
- Denomination: Church of Scotland

History
- Status: Parish church
- Dedication: Saint Andrew

Architecture
- Functional status: Active
- Heritage designation: Category A listed building
- Designated: 11 June 1971
- Completed: 1834

The Old and St Andrew's Church ('Auld Kirk') is a Church of Scotland church in Montrose, Angus. It was dedicated in 1793. The current steeple, designed by James Gillespie Graham, was completed in 1834.
