= William Lamb (sculptor) =

Scottish sculptor and artist

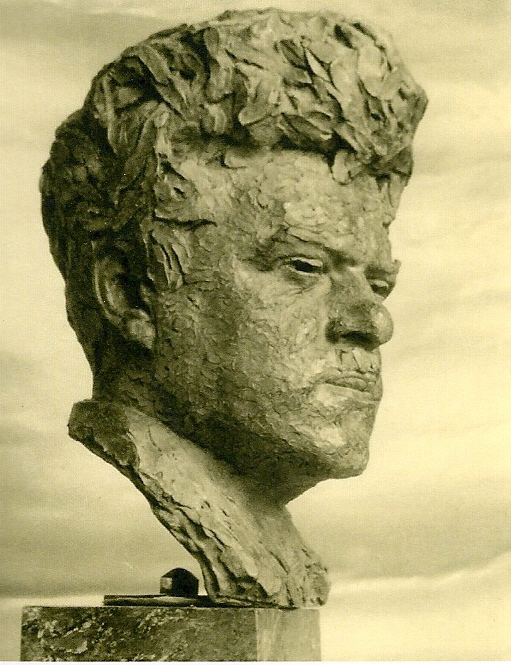
- Self-portrait
- Born: William Lamb; 1 June 1893; Montrose, Angus, Scotland
- Died: 12 January 1951 (aged 57); Stracathro, Angus, Scotland
- Known for: Sculpture
- Movement: Realism, Scottish Renaissance
- Awards: Guthrie Award, 1929

William Lamb RSA (1 June 1893 – 12 January 1951) was a Scottish sculptor and artist. He was a survivor of the "Lost Generation" who came of age in 1914, and it was believed he was scarred, both mentally and physically, by the First World War.

Lamb completed his training in 1915 as a right-handed artist. A war wound incapacitated his right hand, so that after the war he had to retrain as a left-hander. His urge to create was in no way diminished and his preferred medium was sculpture.

Lamb's most productive period was from 1924 to 1933. As a result of an education on strictly traditional lines, he developed a style of modelling that was classically accurate, but which expressed the character and background of his subject. Although he modelled Queen Elizabeth II as Princess Elizabeth aged six, in 1932, he generally eschewed the rich, the famous and the heroic. Instead Lamb settled permanently in his native Montrose, Scotland. It was there he sculpted the inhabitants of the town and neighbourhood, concentrating upon working class models, especially from the fishing community.

Fiercely independent, Lamb despised the young modernists and pre-war baroque fashions alike. He became isolated and developed severe depression around 1935/36, turning into something of a recluse. He never escaped poverty, never married and until the publication of a biography in 2013, his work was largely forgotten outside east central Scotland.

== Biography ==
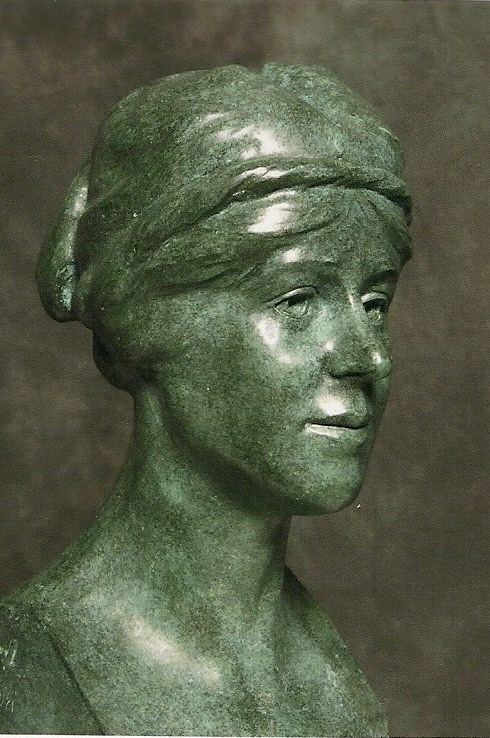
Lena Gaudie 1921.

=== Early life and training ===
William Lamb was born on 1 June 1893 in Montrose, Scotland. He was educated in the town and apprenticed into the family firm of monumental masons. His childhood was overshadowed by the alcoholism of his father. At an early age, he became interested in art and attended evening classes at Montrose Academy. He completed an apprenticeship in his craft, and then moved to Aberdeen to work and to attend Gray's School of Art (now part of Robert Gordon University). He volunteered in 1915, and served in the Queen's Own Cameron Highlanders. Lamb was wounded three times and the third wound, in August 1917 at the Battle of Passchendaele, was a severe one, crippling his dominant right hand and arm. He convalesced in Montrose, and then in Edinburgh, where he received medical attention and attended Edinburgh College of Art. He learned to draw, paint, engrave and model with his left hand.

In September 1922, Lamb journeyed to Paris, where he briefly attended the École des Beaux Arts. In summer of 1923, he toured France on a bicycle; sketching what he saw. In the autumn, he went to Rome for several weeks and also visited Florence and Milan. He returned to London before the end of the year.

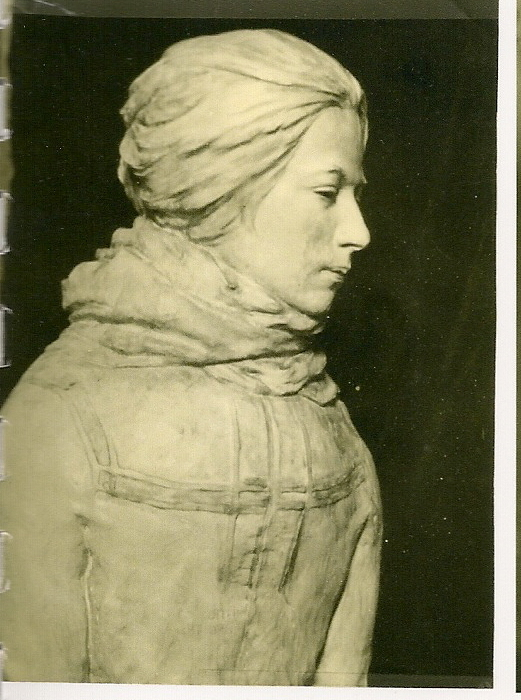
Ferryden Fisherwife, 1929.

=== Artistic career ===
Lamb set up a studio in Montrose in 1924. He earned a livelihood initially by printmaking, almost all etchings, and by drawing. Simultaneously, he started to model whenever he had time or a commission. He gradually fell under the influence of Hugh MacDiarmid and the Scottish Renaissance literary movement which was centred in Montrose. This confirmed his resolve to make his work distinctly Scottish; by modelling the ordinary men and women working in the community around him. In 1929, he won the Guthrie Award for the best work shown by a young Scottish artist at the Royal Scottish Academy's summer exhibition. The work was a bust entitled Ferryden Fisherwife.

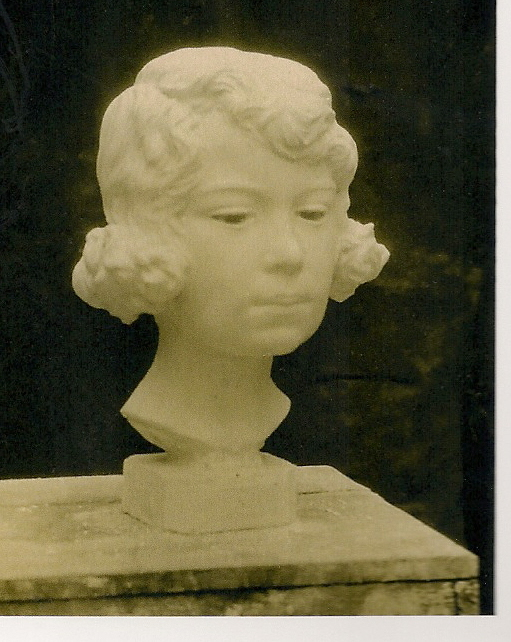
Princess Elizabeth, 1932.

After 1930, the demand for prints declined and Lamb turn to water-colours as his bread and butter. The following year, Lamb was elected an Associate of the Royal Scottish Academy (ARSA); this led to commissions to model the future Queen Elizabeth II (then Princess Elizabeth) aged 6½, and her sister, Princess Margaret Rose, in 1932. These were followed in 1933 by a head of their mother, the Duchess of York (later the Queen Consort, then Queen Elizabeth The Queen Mother).

After his royal commissions, he built himself a new studio, but the collapse of a personal relationship triggered a mental breakdown and his artistic output suffered. As he recovered from his depression, Lamb found that the approach of war made it difficult, and later impossible, to procure materials for modelling. He turned to wood carving and also went back to his craft as a monumental mason to earn his living.

From 1942, the artist's life became a battle between his urge to create and debilitating kidney disease. Lamb died on the 12 January 1951 of kidney failure in Stracathro, Angus; having worked up until two weeks before his death.

== Works ==
=== Sculpture ===
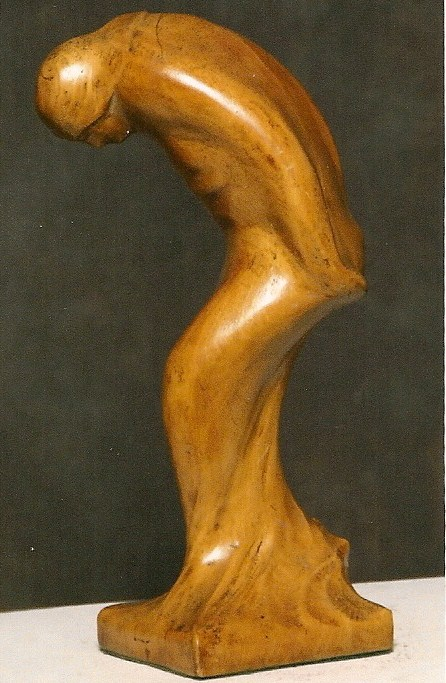
Sou'wester 1947.

Lamb's first major work was The Cynic, a head modelled from an apprentice in 1924. It was exhibited at the Salon (Paris) in 1925 as Tȇte de Garcon.

The Young Fisherman was exhibited at the Royal Academy (RA) in London and the Young Musician (WSC) at the Royal Scottish Academy (RSA) in Edinburgh all in the same year. This trio of exhibits was unusual for an artist's first year.

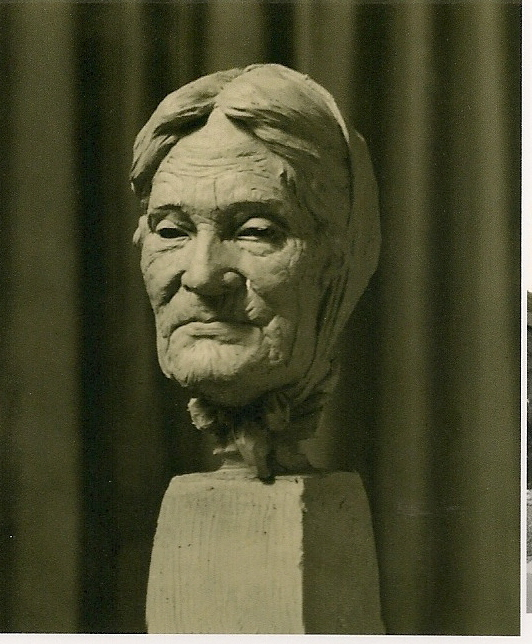
Betsy Baxter 1937.

In the years following, Lamb's more important works were Old John (Père Jean Salon 1926), Violet Jacob (Doncaster 1926), Betty (Printemps Salon 1926), Purpose (RSA 1926), Self Portrait (Portrait d'un Artiste Salon 1927), Bob (Glasgow 1928), Old Salt (RSA 1927), Passing Shower (Dorothy Salon 1929), the Bud (Bébé Jeanette Salon 1927), Hugh MacDiarmid and Pittendrigh MacGillivray (RSA 1932), Ferryden Fisherwife (RSA 1929), My Model listens to a Tall Story (RSA 1940), Paresseux (RSA 1931), Princess Elizabeth (RA 1933), Princess Margaret Rose (RSA 1933), Duchess of York (RSA 1933), The Daily News (1935), Robert Burns 1936 (Sunderland Museum), Bill the Smith (RSA 1937) , Betsy Baxter (RSA 1937), Seafarer (Trawl Hand RSA 1938) and Edward Baird c1932 (Fleming Collection, London 2004).

With the approach of war, Lamb turned to wood carving. In this genre, the more noteworthy works are The Beardless Christ (Five Figures set above the rood screen in the Episcopal Church of St. Mary, Newport-on-Tay), Wind frae the Baltic, Sou-Wester, The Shrew & Gale Force.

Altogether 109 of Lamb's works were shown at the RSA annual exhibition 1925–1951. These included 84 works of sculpture, 5 prints and 20 drawings. A number of his works can be seen in the William Lamb Memorial Studio in Montrose, and elsewhere in the town.

=== Prints ===
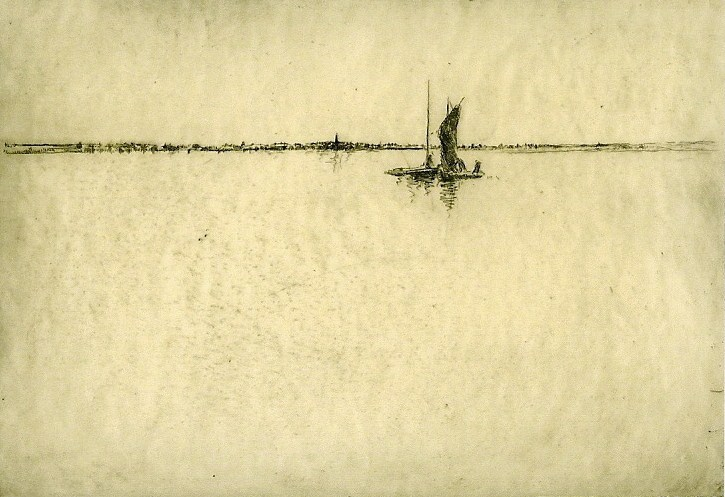
Calm Montrose 1928.

Between 1924 and 1929 Lamb produced more than one hundred prints for the market. They are almost all etchings. Many are derived from the sketches he made in France in 1922/23 and most of the rest are of Scottish origin. There is an almost complete collection of his known prints in the William Lamb Memorial Studio in Montrose. Around 1929 the fashion for etchings came to an end and Lamb turned to water colours.

=== Water-colours ===
Although William Lamb relied on his prints and water-colours for much of his livelihood, his marketing skills were non-existent. This meant that he was never able to turn his talent to much advantage, or to escape from poverty. In addition to poor marketing, the artist was possessive about his water-colours.

When he heard that a buyer was to visit, he would hide away his best works, in case the potential customer chose them. Some critics have found the water-colours dull, but they are expressive of the Scottish east coast and they depict the working lives of those who live there.

=== Drawings ===
There are almost one thousand of Lamb's drawings in the William Lamb studio. It has been said that it is worth making the trip to Montrose to see these alone. The artist's style was minimalist and he was fond of portraying effort, both in men and in horses. The collections of pencil sketches and more formal drawings cover much of his life. His sketches of World War I and his life in the trenches became lost when he was wounded in 1917.

== Influences and legacy ==
=== Inspiration ===
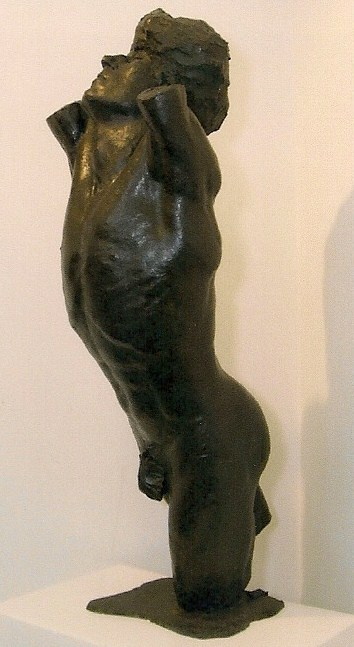
Torso II 1925.

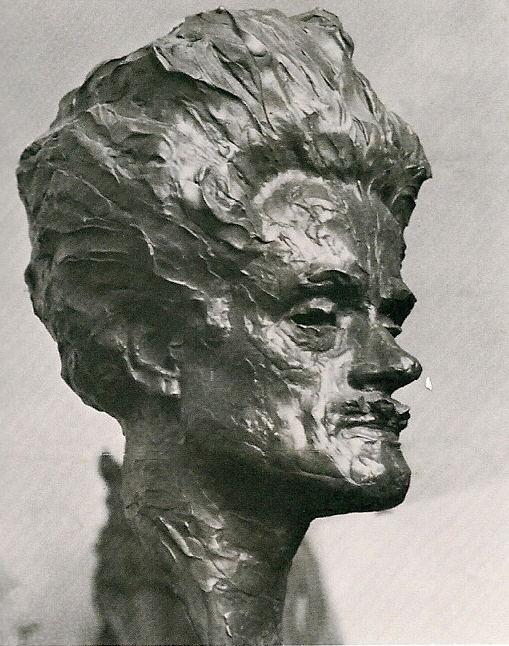
Hugh MacDiarmid 1927.

William Lamb was fiercely independent and on occasion declared that his work was not subject to the influence of others. Nevertheless, influence can be detected throughout his work and, in moments of reflection he acknowledged this. Firstly Lamb was an inheritor of the Scottish Enlightenment and the strong classical tradition rooted at that time in the country's educational system. When he went to Rome and saw for the first time the Greek and Roman sculpture and architecture, he described them as old friends. He admired their accuracy to life, their grace and simplicity.

The second major influence was the Arts & Crafts Movement, active throughout the period of his education. He completed an apprenticeship in stone carving, as a monumental mason, and attended art classes in his free time. Around 1912 he decided that art was to be paramount in his life, but this did not stop him from practising his craft when convenience or necessity made it advantageous to do so.

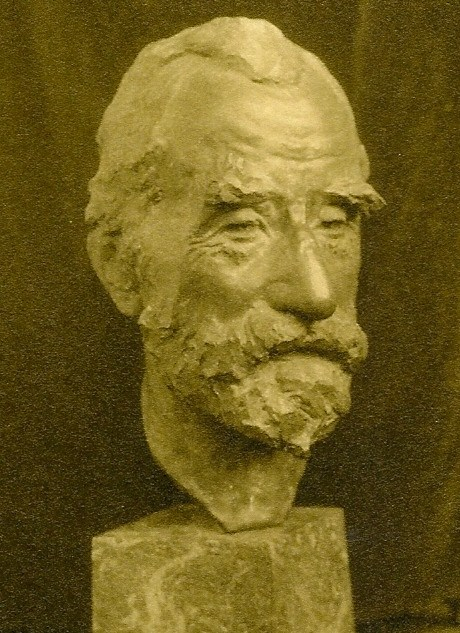
Old John 1925.

When Lamb went to Paris he came under the influence of Auguste Rodin. He was a frequent visitor to the Hotel Biron. Rodin also had started life as a stonemason and decorative carver. His later sculpture displayed the realism and movement that Lamb judged so important. The Scot also acknowledged his debt to the Italian Renaissance and the subsequent French schools. The First World War made Lamb distrust authority and admire art that was simple and down to earth. He was irritated by Academism and disliked the Baroque form fashionable before the war.

When he returned to Scotland in 1924, Lamb came within the orbit of the Scottish Renaissance. This movement was largely inspired by Hugh MacDiarmid who lived at the time in Montrose near to the sculptor. The aim of this movement was to make the arts central to Scottish life. The rebirth was to be rooted in the great European tradition, but should exemplify Scotland. This was to be achieved through portraying Scots working in their local community and by describing the life of ordinary people. The sculptor grew to accept this tenet and lived and worked for the rest of his life in Montrose.

William Lamb was also a gifted draughtsman. He followed the teaching of Horace Lecoq de Boisbaudran who had taught several of the French artists whom Lamb admired. The idea was to gaze at the subject for some time and commit it to visual memory. The drawing done afterwards would capture the essentials without extraneous detail. He respected Edmund Blampied, a skilled draughtsman, who was exhibiting in Paris while the Scot was there. He also liked the etchings of Charles Méryon and this artist's style influenced Lamb's prints.

The final influence upon Lamb's art was World War II. Unable to buy artists' materials, he turned to wood carving. His sculptures in this medium are anonymous and often beaten by the wind. His figures had become cogs in the machine, lashed by the winds of war.

=== Lamb's Legacy ===
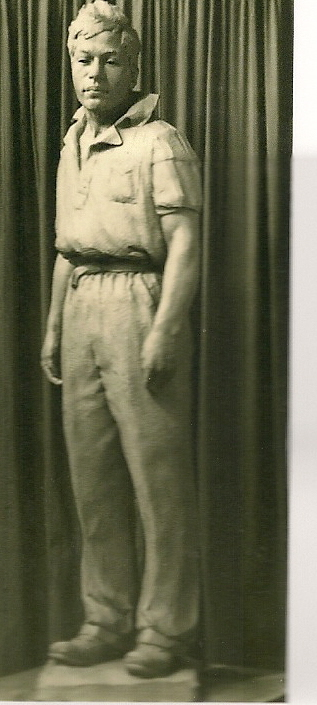
Bill the Smith 1936.

With the exception of his commissions and in spite of his poverty, Lamb was reluctant to sell his work and especially anything that he thought was any good. This meant that he amassed a large and representative collection of his œuvre in his Montrose studio. When he died, he left the studio and its contents to the local authority. The present owners are Angus Council.

The collection has received little public attention outside east central Scotland and is virtually unknown to the wider world. His works achieve the aim of the Scottish Renaissance by illustrating the life and the countryside of the Scottish Lowlands realistically.

== Notes ==
WLC: William Lamb's correspondence WLD: William Lamb's diaries
