= Montrose, Angus =

Coordinates: 56.708°N 2.467°W

Montrose: Scottish Gaelic: Mon Rois; Scots: Montrose, Munross
- Town and former Royal burgh
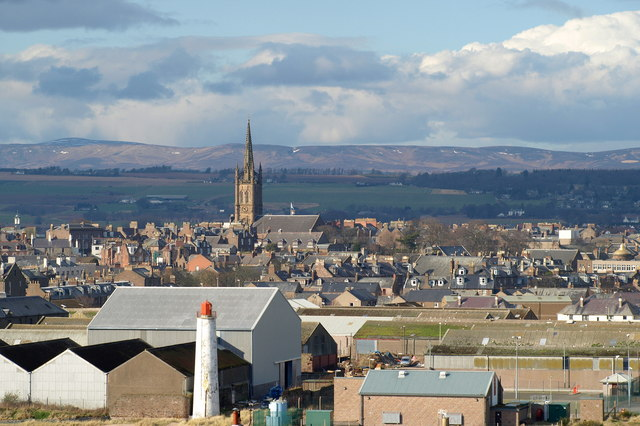
- View of Montrose from Ferryden

- Flag

- Location within Angus
- Population: 11,251 (2022)
- Demonym: Montrosian; Gable Ender
- OS grid reference: NO715575
- Council area: Angus
- Lieutenancy area: Angus
- Country: Scotland
- Sovereign state: United Kingdom
- Post town: Montrose
- Postcode district: DD10
- Dialling code: 01674
- Police: Scotland
- Fire: Scottish
- Ambulance: Scottish
- UK Parliament: Angus and Perthshire Glens
- Scottish Parliament: Angus North and Mearns

Montrose (/mʌnˈtroʊz/ mun-TROHZ; Scottish Gaelic: Mon Rois [mɔn ˈrˠɔʃ]) is an historic coastal town and former royal burgh in Angus, Scotland. It is situated 28 miles (45 kilometres) north of Dundee and 37 miles (60 kilometres) south of Aberdeen, Montrose lies between the mouths of the North and South Esk rivers. It is the northernmost coastal town in Angus and developed as a natural harbour that traded in skins, hides, and cured salmon in medieval times.

With a population of 11,251 in 2022, it makes it the third most-populous settlement in Angus. The town functions as a port, but the major employer is GlaxoSmithKline, which was saved from closure in 2006. The skyline of Montrose is dominated by the 220-foot (67 m) steeple of Old and St Andrew's Church, designed by James Gillespie Graham and built between 1832 and 1834.

Montrose is a town with a wealth of architecture, and is a centre for international trade. It is an important commercial port for the oil and gas industry. It is known for its wide thoroughfare and high street, which leads to picturesque closes containing secluded gardens. The town has a view of a tidal lagoon, Montrose Basin, which is considered a nature reserve of international importance. It is the largest inland salt water basin in the UK, and an important habitat for the mute swan. Just outside Montrose is the 18th-century House of Dun, designed by the Scottish architect William Adam and built in 1730 for David Erskine, Lord Dun, 13th Laird of Dun.

== History ==
=== Toponymy and early history ===
Prehistoric elements are found in the vicinity of Montrose, including the Stone of Morphie located to the north. One ancient name for Montrose was Celurca. The place-name is formed from the Scottish Gaelic Moine (meaning moor or peat moss) and Ros (meaning peninsula or promontory), perhaps ultimately of Pictish origin. The first documentary evidence of the existence of Montrose is the burgh charter issued by David I, ′who founded the town around 1140 as Sallorch or Sallork. By 1178 the name had taken the form Munross before becoming Montrose. Folk etymology attributes the origin of the town's name as "Mount of Roses". This is reflected by the motto on the town's seal: Mare ditat, rosa decorat. (English: The sea enriches, the rose adorns)

=== Medieval history ===
Montrose was visited and plundered in numerous instances by Danes. In 980 it was sacked and razed to the ground. It was once believed that a castle had existed in Montrose in the 10th century and was destroyed by Kenneth III. However the authenticity of this account has been disputed.

In the two subsequent centuries there are no precise dates in its history. During the 1140s it was an important trading town. The trading revenues received from Montrose as well as Forfar and Dundee were acquired by Malcolm IV and contributed to Restenneth Priory. In 1178 William the Lion built a castle nearby in which he would occasionally reside. The ruins have acquired the name Red Castle. The last record of a charter there was in 1198. A convent dedicated to the Virgin Mary is said to have been founded in 1230 by Alan Durward but the precise location is unknown. In 1244 the town succumbed to fire.

In July 1296 during the Wars of Independence, Edward I of England visited the town with 30,000 of his men and stayed at Munros castle for three nights. Some accounts state that it was there that he humiliated the Scottish king, John de Balliol, by publicly stripping him of his royal insignia and status; other accounts claim that this occurred in Brechin. Twelve burgesses of the town swore allegiance to Edward I to protect themselves and the community of the town. The following year the castle, which was manned by an English garrison, was destroyed by William Wallace who is said to have slain all soldiers in sight. The site of the castle, known as Castlestead, is at the southern end of the High Street. David II visited it towards the end of his reign in 1371. The Dukedom of Montrose was created in 1488.

During the 15th century, the inhabitants of the town found themselves increasingly under heel of the Lairds of Dun who ransacked and took possession of property and cattle. The lairds are said to have arrived in the middle of one night on horseback heavily armed. The burghesses of the town immediately sent out an appeal to the Duke of Montrose for protection but the messenger was purportedly murdered before the appeal arrived. It was then that James IV of Scotland intervened and settled the matter.

=== Modern history ===
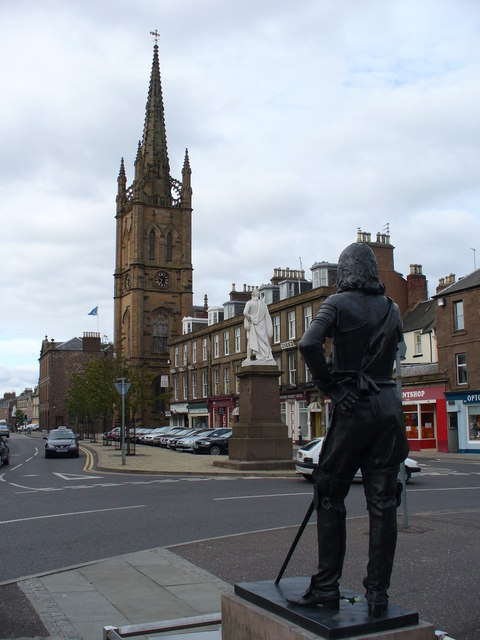
Montrose and the steeple

From its early inception as a port Montrose had traded in skins, hides and cured salmon, and in the 17th century Montrose also began to export wheat and barley in regular trading transactions with the Hanseatic League. The town imported flax and timber from the Baltic; salt, fruit and wine from France and Portugal. The wealth this brought to the town is demonstrated in the surviving houses built by landowning and merchant families, as well as local street names of "America Street", "California Street", "Baltic Street" and "India Street" evidencing its trading heritage.

The site of the castle, now known as Castlestead, was the birthplace of the famous James Graham, 1st Marquess of Montrose. Graham signed the National Covenant against Charles I's reorganisation of the Kirk in Scotland, fighting in the ensuing Bishops' Wars, but later switched to the king's side, only to be captured and executed in Edinburgh in 1650.

Between 1677 and the summer of 1678, Dronner, a Dutch engineer, began to build a dyke across the Montrose Basin, designed to drain and reclaim the northern half of the basin. However the dyke was destroyed in a storm soon afterwards. One of the most vocal objectors to the scheme was the elderly Meggie Cowie, who was said to have made blasphemous comments to those who were involved. She was tried for witchcraft, found guilty, and burnt at the stake on 14 January 1679.

==== 1715 and 1745 rebellions ====
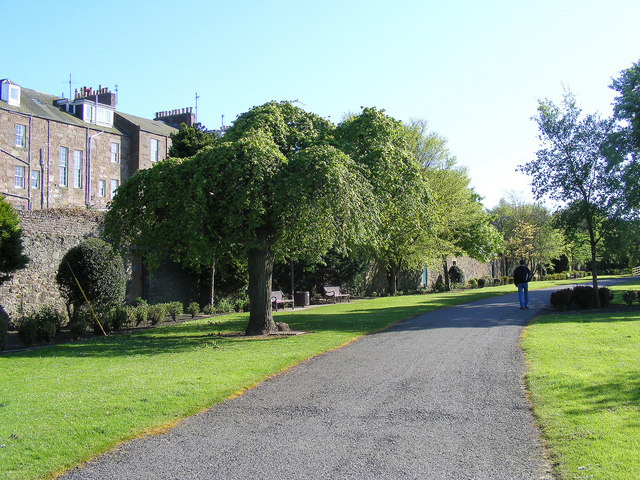
Park in Montrose

The final chapter of the ill-fated 1715 Jacobite rebellion was also played out in Montrose. Towards the end of the uprising (which had lasted nearly six months, from September 1715 to February 1716) James Francis Edward Stuart (the Old Pretender; formerly James, Prince of Wales) arrived in Montrose, where he spent his last night in Scotland, on 4 February 1716. He sailed from Montrose to exile in France. The town was held for his son, Charles Edward Stuart (Bonnie Prince Charlie; the Young Pretender), 30 years later and in February 1746 the largest naval battle of the war was fought in Montrose Harbour.

==== Smuggling and prosperity from trade ====
During the 18th century the town was a major smuggling centre. It profited from the slave trade, but only for a brief time. The wealth accrued by trade was substantial. Wealthy merchants in the 18th and 19th centuries dominated the town and built their houses gable to gable. Hence Montrosians have inherited the sobriquet, "gable-enders". A statistical account taken between 1791 and 1799 estimates the population in the 1750s as 4,248; in 1776 as 4,465; in 1784 as 4,866 and in 1790 as 5,194. Contemporaries expected that many would emigrate at the conclusion of the American Revolutionary War, but those who did leave were few.

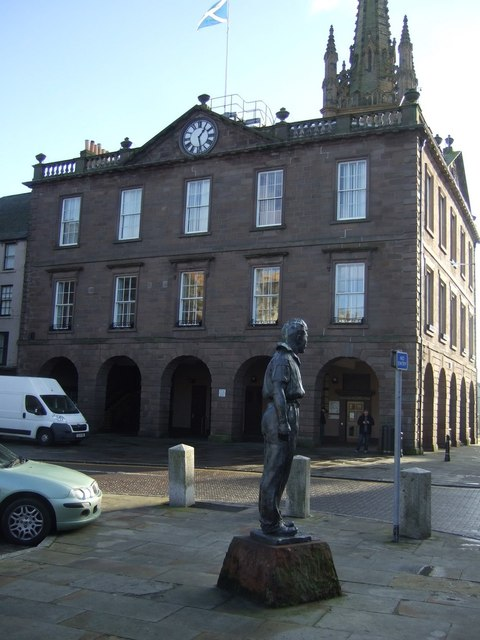
Montrose Town House

Samuel Johnson made a tour of the town on his visit to Scotland in the 1770s. He said of it:

"...we travelled on to Montrose, which we surveyed in the morning and found it well-built, airy, and clean. The town house is a handsome fabrick with a portico. We then went to view the English chapel, and found it a small church, clean to a degree unknown in any other part of Scotland, with commodious galleries, and what was yet less expected, with an organ.".

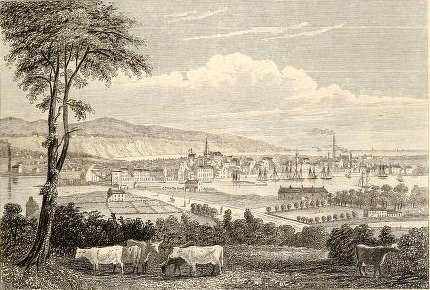
View of the town in 1838

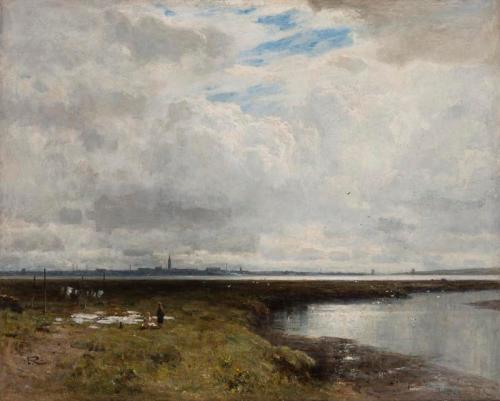
Montrose by Sir George Reid, 1888

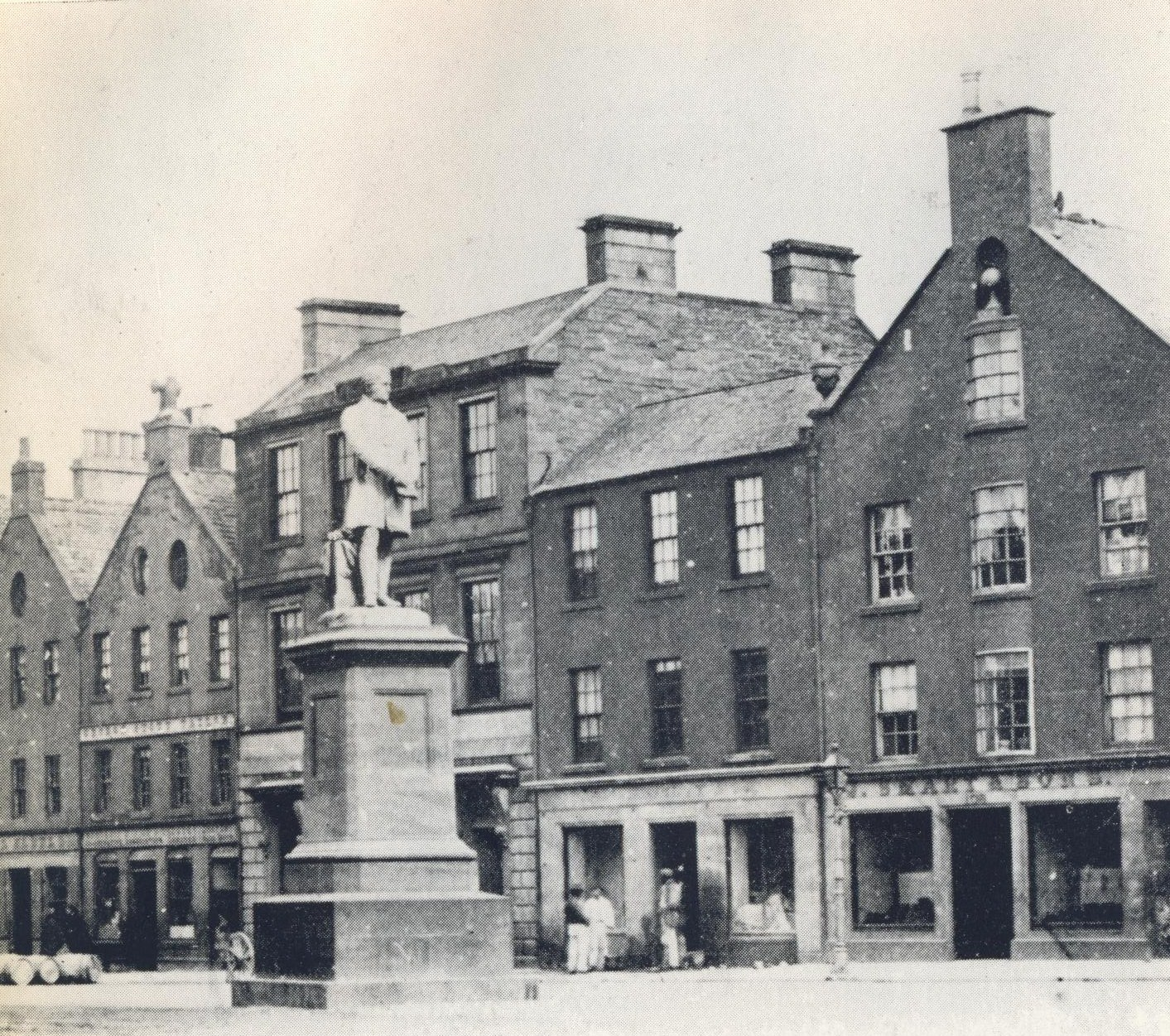
Montrose High Street during the 1870s

==== Lunatic asylum ====
Alexander Christie (c. 1721–1794) was provost in the town during the 1760s and 1780s and oversaw the establishment of Scotland's first lunatic asylum in Montrose in 1781 which eventually became known as Sunnyside Royal Hospital. The asylum, initially called Montrose Lunatic Asylum, Infirmary and Dispensary, was founded by Susan Carnegie of Charleton to treat both paupers and private patients, and was originally situated on Montrose Links. It was granted a royal charter in 1810. In 1858 it moved to Sunnyside farm at the nearby village of Hillside. Its facilities were expanded several times in the next few decades, and it underwent various changes in name, finally becoming Sunnyside Royal Hospital in 1962. Sunnyside remained in use for the treatment of people with mental illnesses until its final closure in 2011 when many of its patients and functions moved to the Susan Carnegie Centre at Stracathro Hospital.

In 1785 a subscription library for learned men was formed.

=== 20th century ===
Before World War I the Royal Flying Corps established a base at Montrose (later RAF Montrose). On 26 February 1913, it became the first operational military aerodrome to be established in the United Kingdom. The following results for Montrose in the years before the First World War were obtained from the annual reports of the Fishery Board.

Fishery Statistics

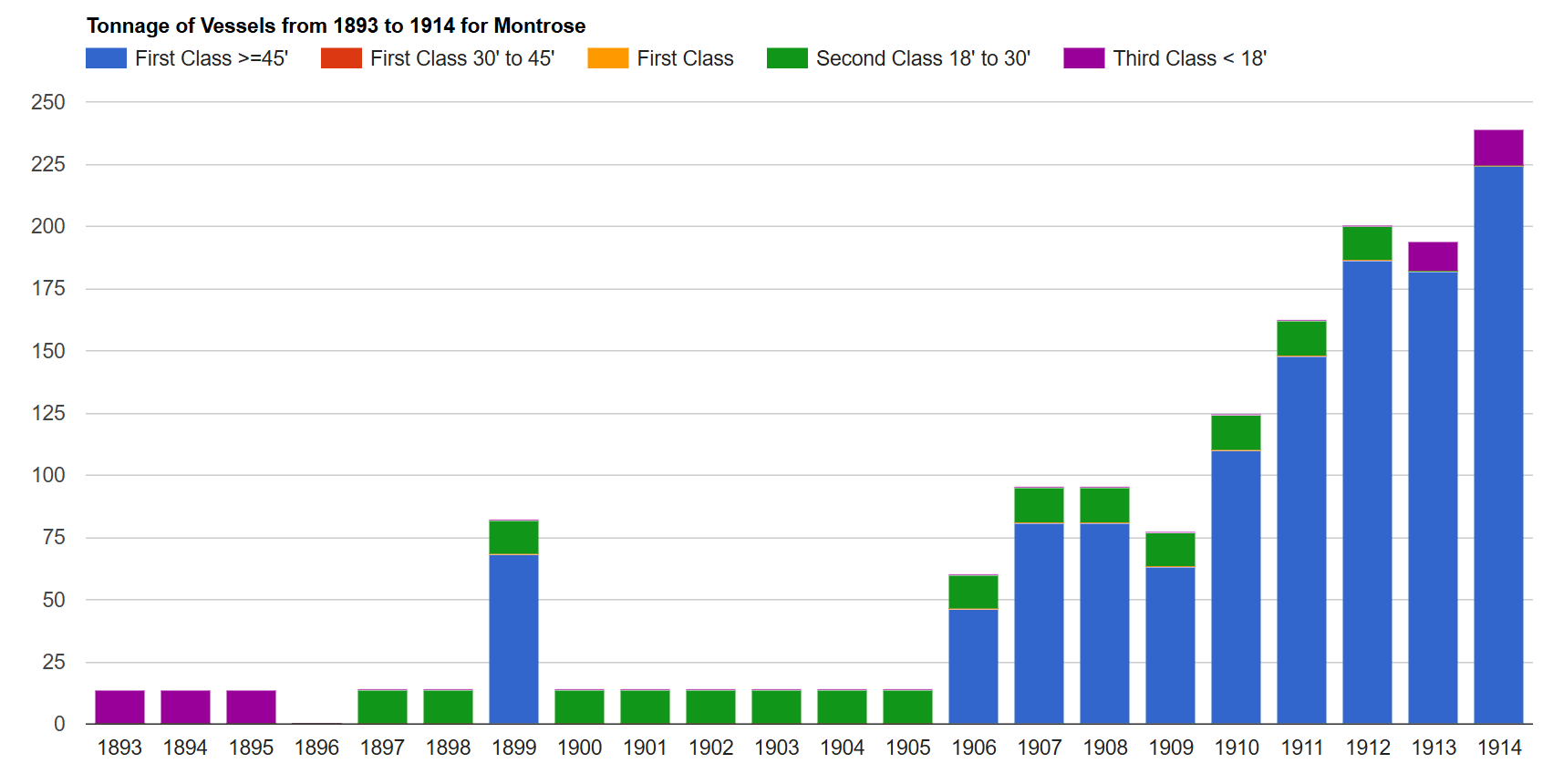
Tonnage of vessels

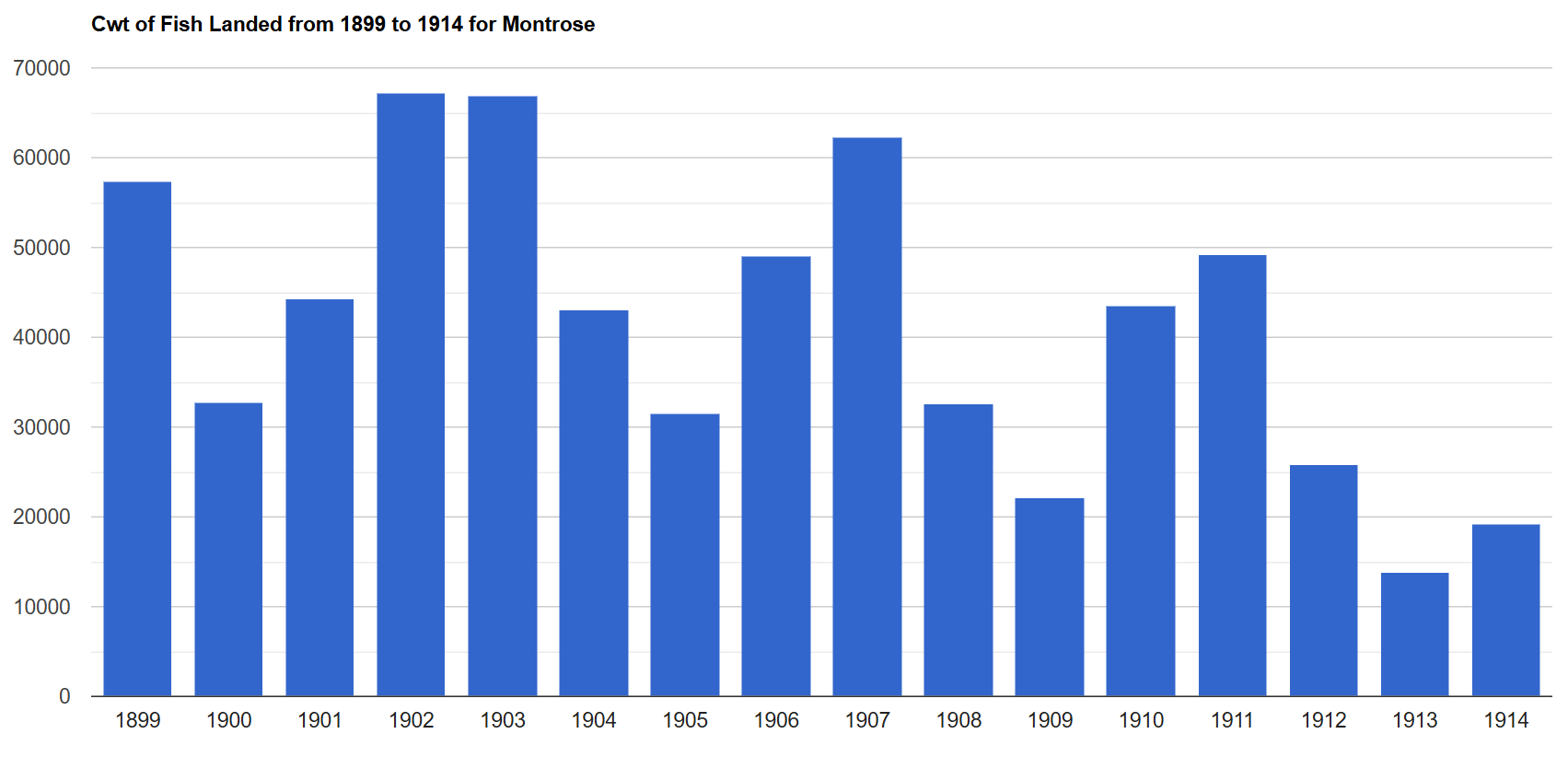
Cwt of fish landed (excluding shellfish)
(1 cwt is about 50 kg)

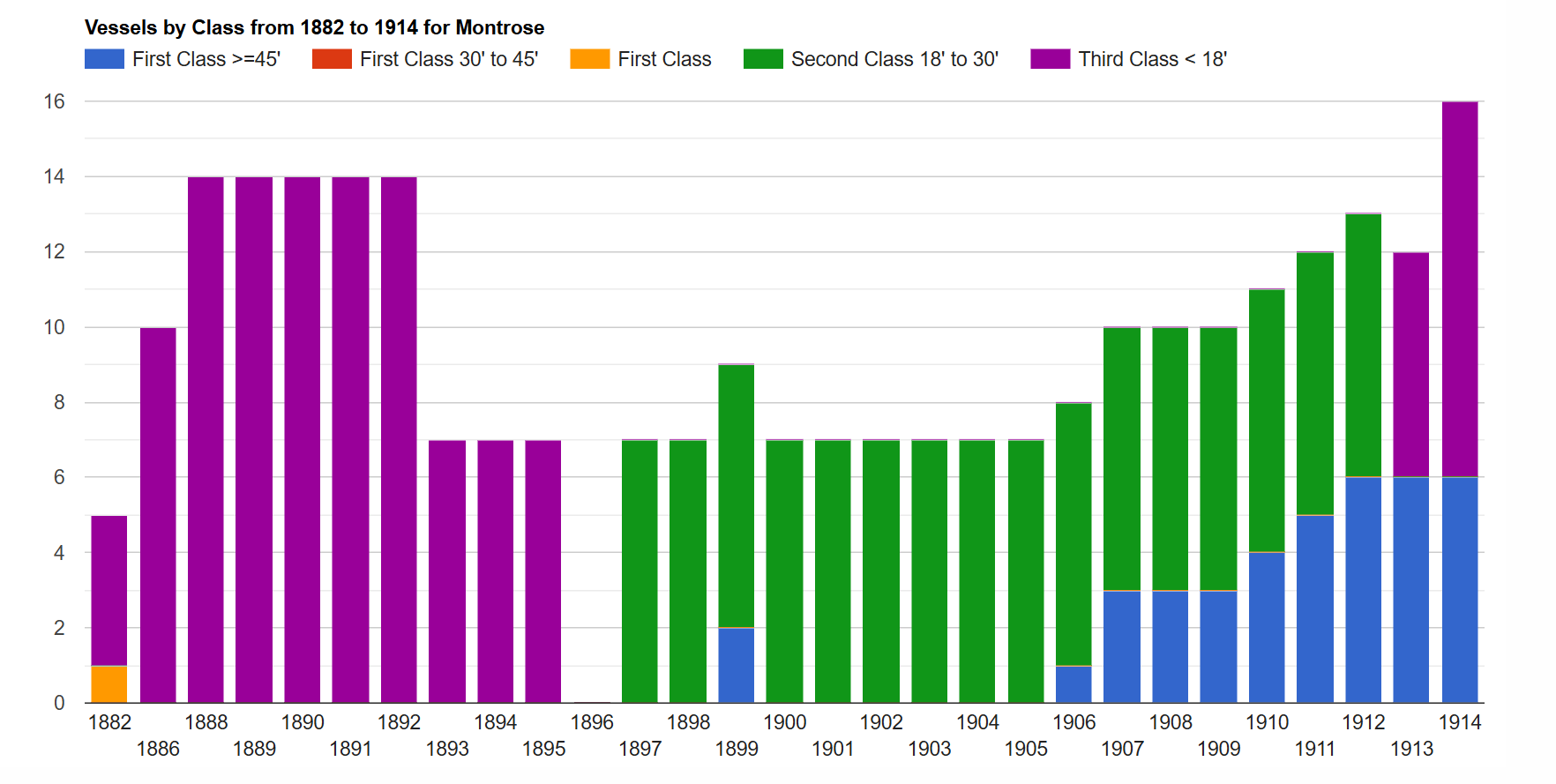
Vessels by class

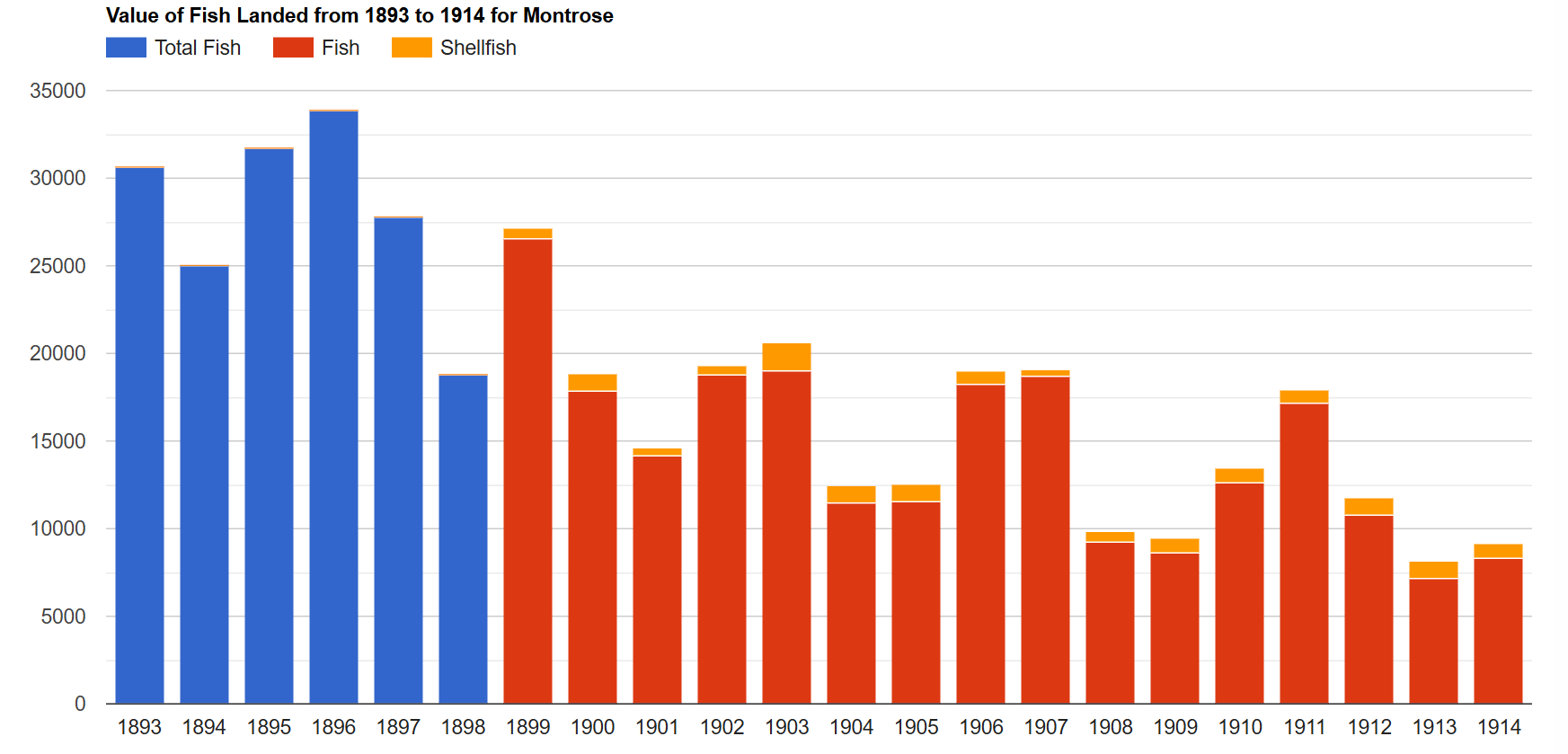
Value (£) of fish landed

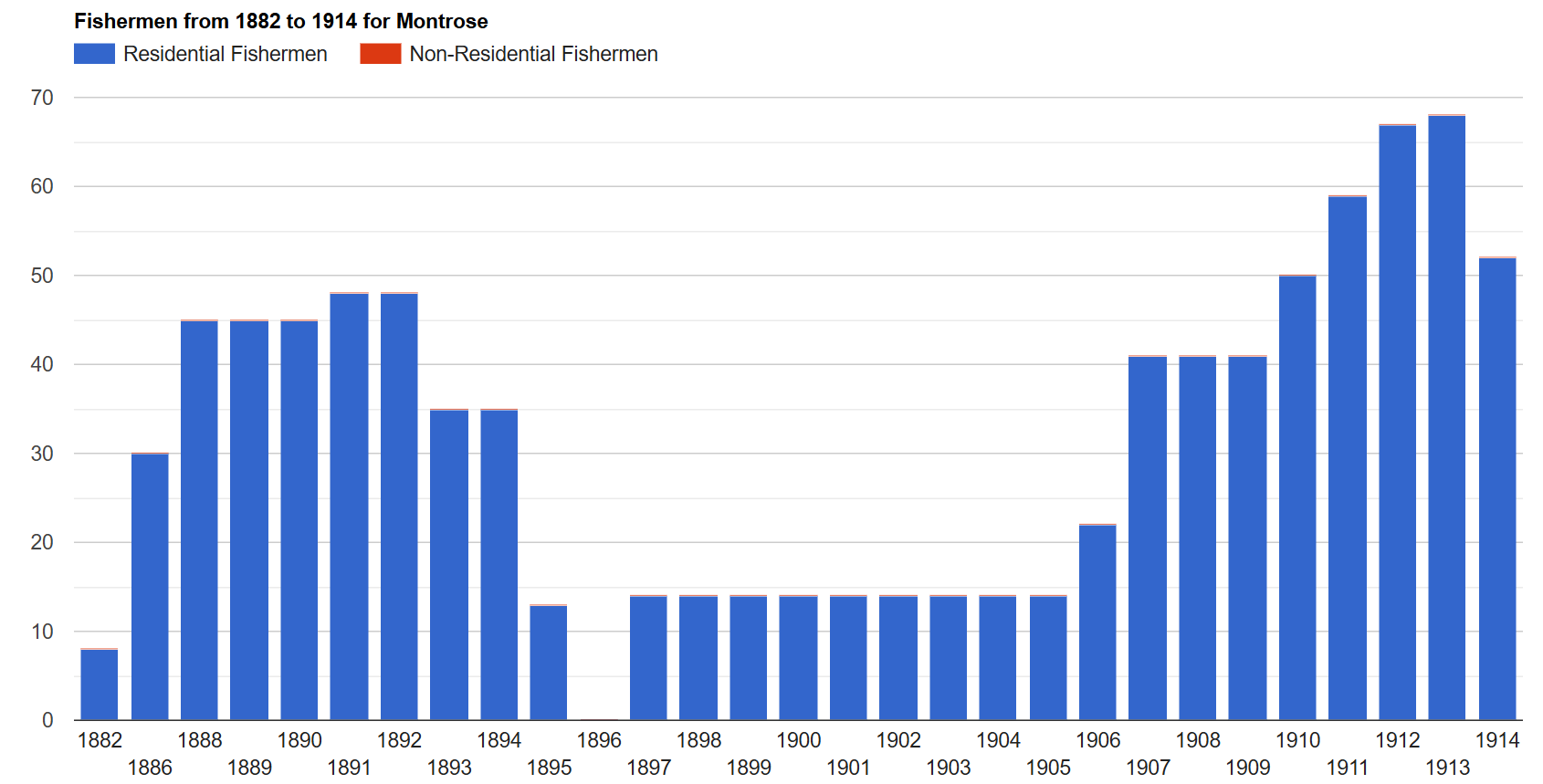
Numbers of fishermen

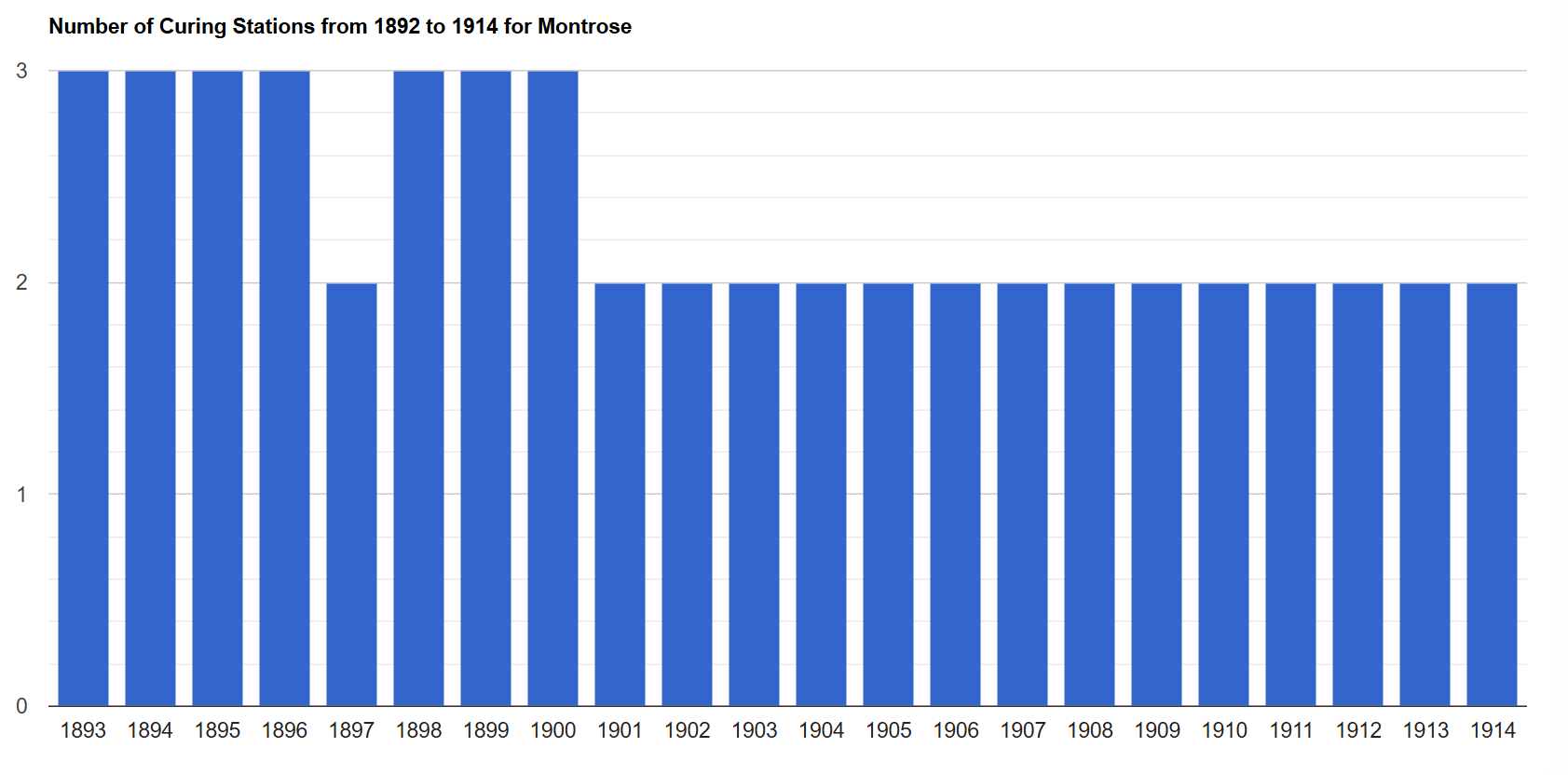
Number of curing stations

Between the wars, Montrose was a focus for key figures of the Scottish Renaissance. In 1920, a young Christopher Murray Grieve (later Hugh MacDiarmid) was employed as a reporter on the Montrose Review. By 1922 he had been elected as an Independent Labour Party councillor. The poet and novelist Violet Jacob was brought up at the nearby House of Dun and spent time in Angus during the 1920s. The sculptor William Lamb was born in Montrose and returned to the town in 1924.

Another native of Montrose, the writer Tom MacDonald (Fionn MacColla) returned to Montrose in 1929, as did his friend the painter Edward Baird. Willa and Edwin Muir lived at her mother's house in Montrose at various times during the 1920s. The poet Helen Cruickshank attended Montrose Academy, though she had moved to Edinburgh by the 1920s. She was a key figure in maintaining the network of contacts between writers and artists of Scotland's inter-war cultural renaissance.

A painting of Montrose from the air, 1940

During World War II Montrose became a hub for a constant stream of international pilots from all over the Commonwealth, Poland, Czechoslovakia, America, Russia, France and other allied nations. As well as a training base, RAF Montrose was also an operational airfield for Hawker Hurricane and Supermarine Spitfire squadrons, which flew sorties over Norway and were a part of the air defences of Edinburgh. Of course, this also made the town a target for German aircraft, and it was bombed on more than one occasion. Despite its coastal location presenting a danger, large numbers of children and young mothers from Dundee were evacuated there during the period of the Phoney War. Initially numbers totalled around 2,000; but in a second wave around 1,200 more were sent. As was the case in many other receiving areas, the local population was concerned by the condition of the urban poor, and impetigo and vermin were found on some of those evacuated. By June 1940 Montrose could no longer provide shelter.

Montrose was a royal burgh until 1975.

==== Bamse ====
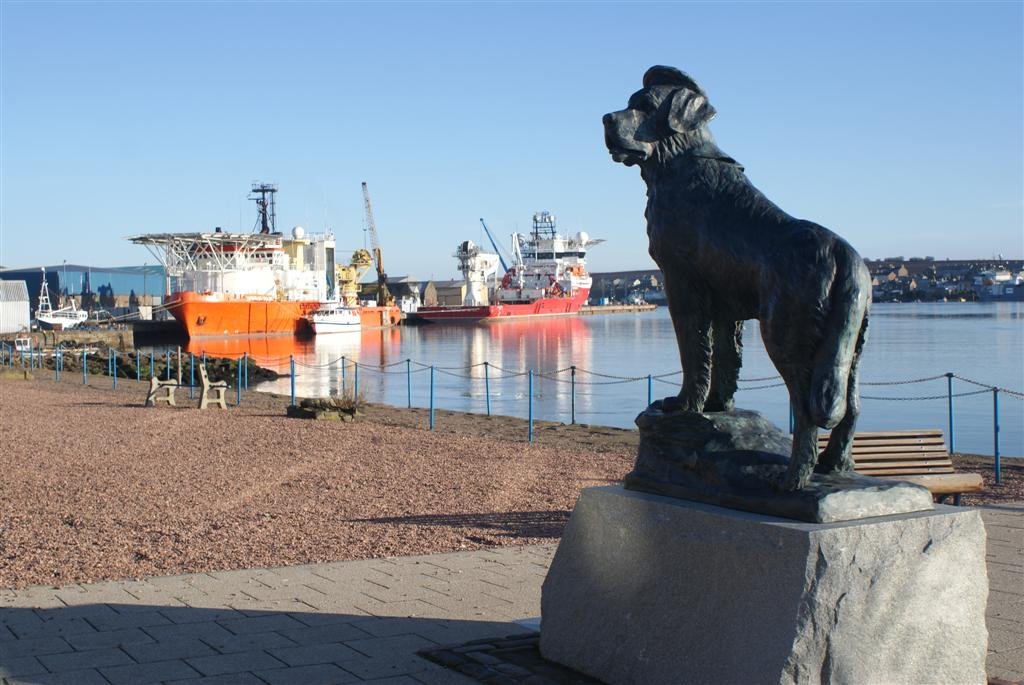
Statue of Bamse at Montrose Harbour

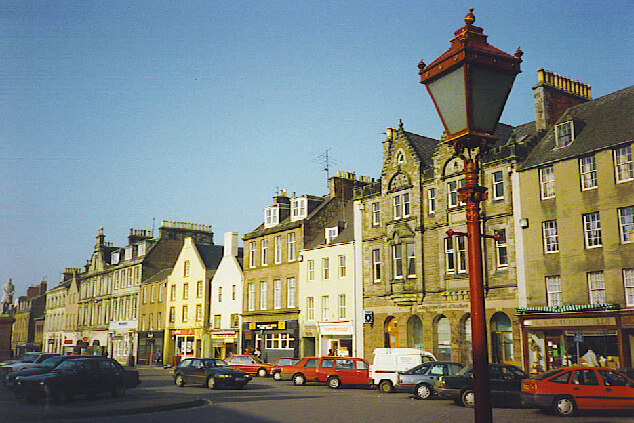
Montrose high street in 1994

Bamse (meaning 'teddybear' in Norwegian), a St Bernard dog famed for his exploits and popular in local imagination, is buried in the town. Bamse the Norwegian Sea Dog arrived in Montrose on the Royal Norwegian Navy minesweeper Thorodd during World War II with Captain Erling Hafto, his owner, who registered him as a crew member. He saved the life of Lieutenant Commander Olav Nilsen at Dundee Docks, and generally protected his fellow sailors. In stories Bamse is said to have got up on his hind legs and, at over 6 feet (1.8 m) tall, clamped his great paws on assailants to end any fight. On his death in July 1944, Montrose schools were closed and 800 children lined the route to his graveside funeral.

The Bamse Project raised £50,000 to erect a larger than life-size bronze statue of Bamse at Montrose Harbour. Half the donations came from Norway. The statue was unveiled by the Duke of York in October 2007.

== Governance ==
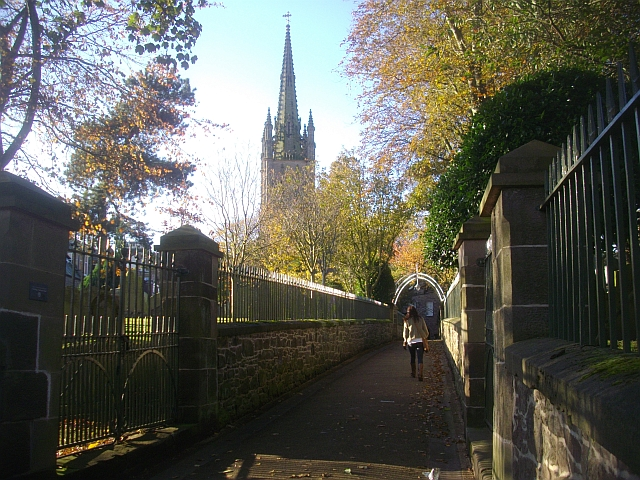
The footpath to the high street is known as the Kirky Steps.

Montrose is represented within Angus Council by the Montrose & District Ward, from which four councillors are elected. The members elected from this ward are, as of 2022: Bill Duff (Scottish National Party), Tommy Stewart (Independent), Kenny Braes (Scottish National Party) and Iain Gall (Conservative).

The town is part of the Angus and Perthshire Glens constituency of the Parliament of the United Kingdom which returns a Member of Parliament (MP) to the House of Commons, at Westminster. The constituency's MP is Dave Doogan of the SNP who has been the MP since 2019.

Montrose is also part of the Angus North and Mearns constituency of the Scottish Parliament that elects a single MSP and also part of the North East Scotland electoral region which elects seven additional Members of the Scottish Parliament. The constituency's MSP is currently Dawn Black of the Scottish National Party.

== Geography and natural features ==
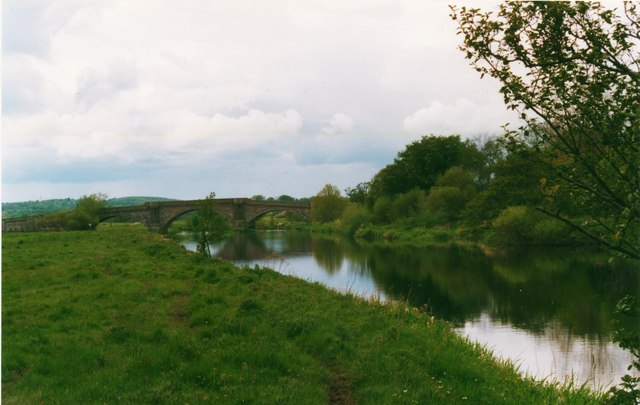
The Bridge of Dun near Montrose is surrounded by scenic greenery and secluded spots.

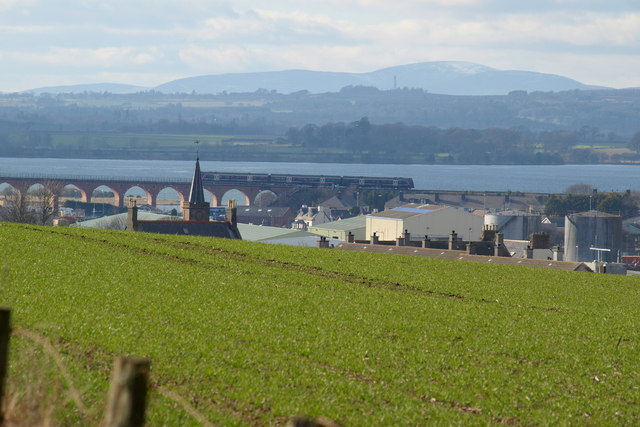
View towards Montrose from Ferryden

Montrose occupies a position on the north bank of Montrose Basin at the mouth of the River South Esk on the east coast of Scotland, 11 miles (18 km) NNE of Arbroath, 19 miles (31 km) SW of Stonehaven, and 7.2 miles (12 km) ESE of Brechin. The town lies 62.2 miles (100 km) NNE of Edinburgh, and 373.2 miles (601 km) NNW of London. The built-up area occupies a roughly rectangular shape 2 miles (3 km) long by 0.75 miles (1 km) wide, aligned in a north–south orientation. The land is relatively flat, rising gradually to around 15m elevation to the north of the town.

The expanse of the town extends to the villages on its fringes; Hillside and Ferryden. It lies close to the hamlets of Lunan and St Cyrus. The rural location ensures that the air quality is good, with low levels of nitrogen dioxide and PM10.

=== Montrose Basin ===
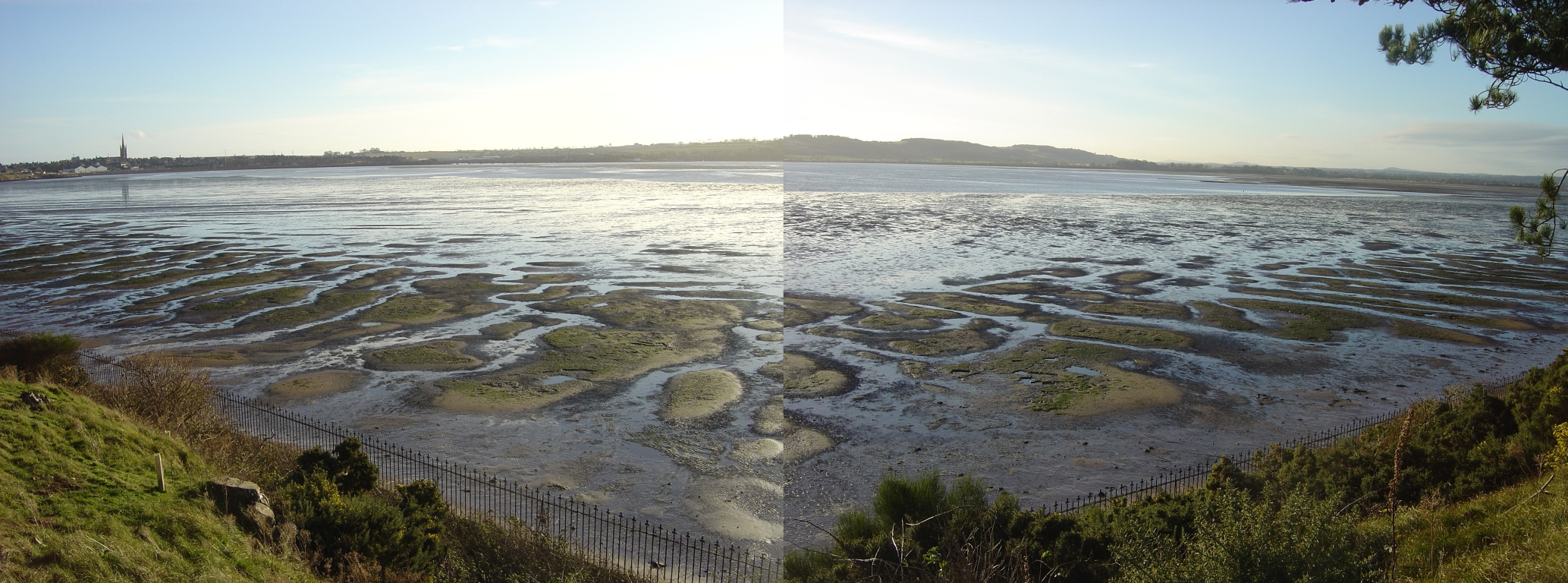
Montrose Basin

The Montrose Basin is a shallow estuary approximately three miles in diameter. It is situated where the River South Esk meets the North Sea. During the 16th century, local landowners desiring more arable land considered reducing its size, but their plans were never carried out.

In 1981 the Montrose Basin Nature Reserve was created. The Scottish Wildlife Trust operates a modern, purpose-built wildlife centre at Rossie Braes, which offers good telescopic and televisual views of the area, and of the thousands of migratory birds which pass through the area in all seasons.

In summer one might see the osprey which hunts along the length of the Basin, or a kingfisher flitting past. The artificial sand martin bank is a hive of activity all spring and early summer. One can watch the blue tits and barn swallows inside their nests, and take in the panoramic vista of the rolling Angus countryside and hills.

In October and November there are 38,000 birds using the basin. In winter, 20,000 pink-footed geese take up residence on the mudflats, feeding in the nearby fields by day, and returning to the safety of the Basin in the evening. The many feeders attract brightly coloured field and garden birds and the occasional woodpecker.

Research published by Scottish Natural Heritage in 2009 claimed that the population of greylag geese had fallen as a result of climate change.

=== Montrose Beach ===
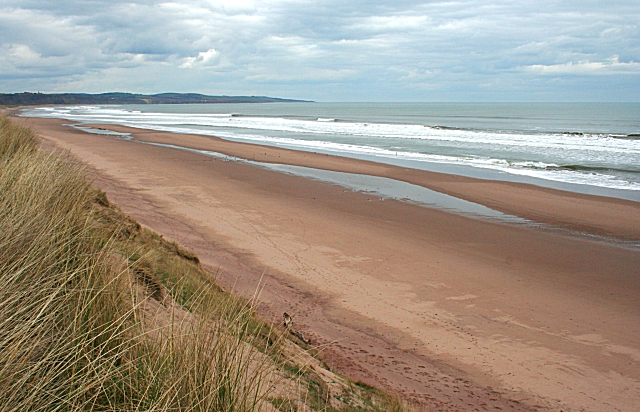
Montrose Beach

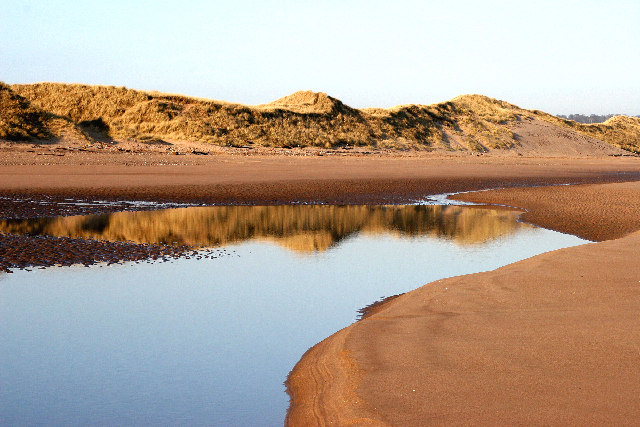
Dunes at Kinnaber, Montrose

The 3-mile-long (4.8 km) sandy beach has been awarded a Blue Flag for its eco credentials. The surrounding Traill Pavilion and Seafront Splash! facilities with an arcade, a playground, a café and an ice-cream stall are popular amongst locals and visitors alike. North of the town the River North Esk enters the North Sea across the beach.

The historically observed average rate of erosion of the beach is between 2.8–7.0 metres (9–23 ft) per year, which has been linked to climate change.

The Save our Sands Campaign (SOS) was set up on 26 March 2009 to raise awareness amidst concerns over the erosion of Montrose beach, caused by the "one million tonnes of sand, swept by the tide into the harbour...removed from the local area over the past 25 years". In 2006, 150,000 tonnes were shipped to Aberdeen to fortify its dwindling beach. This was met with opposition from Montrose Golf Links who believed that the golf course built on top of the dunes, as one of the oldest in the world, should be protected. The sand dunes are becoming unstable due to increasing tides which has forced the Montrose Golf Links to consider moving elements of the golf course more inland. A major scheme of engineered coastal protection was discouraged by Scottish Natural Heritage on the grounds that it would be unsustainable and could harm a protected coastal site at St Cyrus.

A film made by local broadcaster Anthony Baxter in January 2009 highlighted the issue and was designed to attract attention for urgent action and put pressure on local politicians. The group is concerned that Angus Council is not acting efficiently to halt the effects of erosion and believes a full study should be carried out. The film won the best short film category in the BFFS Community Cinema Festival in 2009. Since 2009 a team from the University of Dundee has begun assessing the coastline around Montrose in a two-year study to decide the best way of managing coastal erosion. The film titled "SOS Montrose Dredging" was posted on YouTube in 2009.

In November 2023, during Storm Babet, the beach eroded by three metres, leading to the promenade walkway collapsing.

== Demography ==
The 2022 Scottish census gave Montrose's total resident population as 11,251. This makes it the third largest town in Angus, after Arbroath, Forfar and Carnoustie.

Since the Second World War the population of Montrose has increased. The presence of Dundee families in Montrose during wartime persuaded a number to settle there. This altered the demographics of the town and led to the building of housing estates in the 1960s. A number of people from the Polish community who had served with the British forces at RAF Montrose also settled.

The increase in the elderly population is reflected in the profusion of nursing and residential homes and in recent plans to extend provision for sheltered housing. Data published by Scottish Neighbourhood Statistics in 2008 records the population of Montrose & District as 15,013, which is around 18% of the population of Angus as a whole. Of this total 17.6% are children, 60% are of working age and 22% are pensioners. Around 12% of those who live in the town are unemployed and 14.1% of households are ‘income deprived’.

Historic population of Montrose, Angus (Note: Early population statistics (1801–1841) include both the Burgh of Montrose and the outlying parish)
Year	1801	1811	1821	1831	1841	1851	1861	1871	1881	1891	1901
Population	7,975	8,955	10,338	12,055	13,402	14,328	14,563	14,548	14,973	12,883	12,427
Year	1911	1921	1931	1941	1951	1961	1971	1981	1991	2001	2011
Population	10,974	10,979	10,196	(Note: No census 1941 due to World War II)	10,762	-	10,063	11,214	11,467	10,845	11,955
Year	2022										
Population	11,251										
Census: 1801–2022

== Education ==
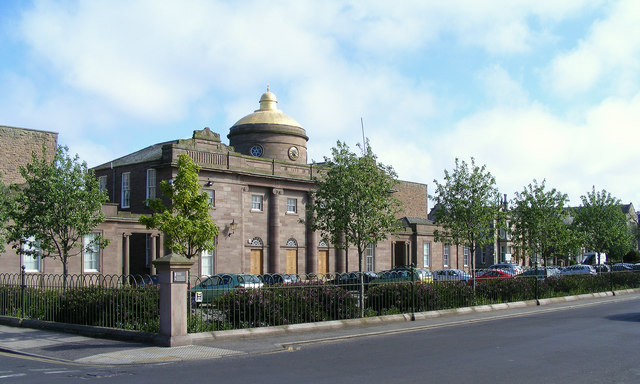
Montrose Academy

Schools include six primary schools - Lochside, Ferryden, Southesk, Rosemount, Borrowfield and St Margaret's - and one secondary school, Montrose Academy.

== Economy ==
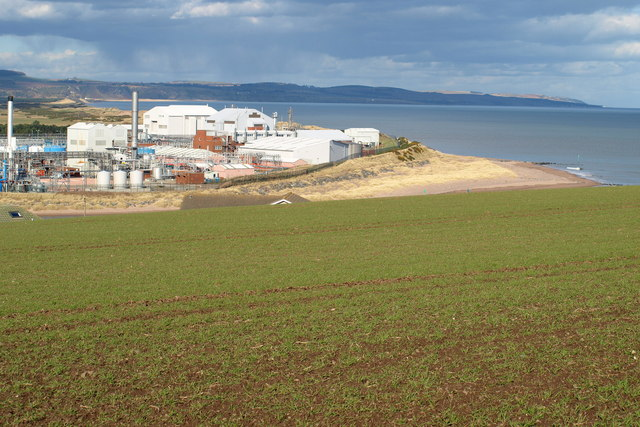
Glaxo Montrose

The economy of the town has been expanding since the end of the Second World War. GlaxoSmithKline has been a major source of jobs since the 1950s. Other significant employers include Tesco, Co-operative Group, Petrofac, National Oilwell Varco, Baker Hughes and Argos. The Lochside Distillery, located on Brechin Road north of the town centre, was closed down in the 1990s and the buildings demolished in 2005 after a fire. Four commercial units were built on the site in 2018. BT initially upgraded the local telephone exchange to grant the town access to super fast fibreoptic broadband services, one of only three towns to be chosen in Scotland. The average price of housing in the town is between £106,054 and £131,539, a rise on the 1998 average between £42,640 and £51,200.

=== Tourism ===
Since 2002 there has been a focus on attracting new visitors to the town with the foundation of the Montrose Town Partnership, the aim of which is to "encourage representatives of the public, private and community sector to act together to develop the economic potential of Montrose to address the needs of local people and visitors alike". Membership includes The Montrose Society, Montrose Heritage Trust, Montrose Community Council, Montrose Golf Links Ltd, MERPRO Leisure, Montrose Business and Retailers Association, Scottish Wildlife Trust, Angus Council, Ferryden & Craig and Hillside, Dun and Logie Pert community councils. Since 2002 they have produced a number of promotional leaflets and have established a weekly Saturday market in the town centre. In 2002 plans were unveiled to renovate the Mid Links. The project was completed in 2003 at the total cost of £1.8million with £1.2million granted by the Heritage Lottery Fund. Plaques have been incorporated to inform visitors of the historical heritage of the town's buildings.

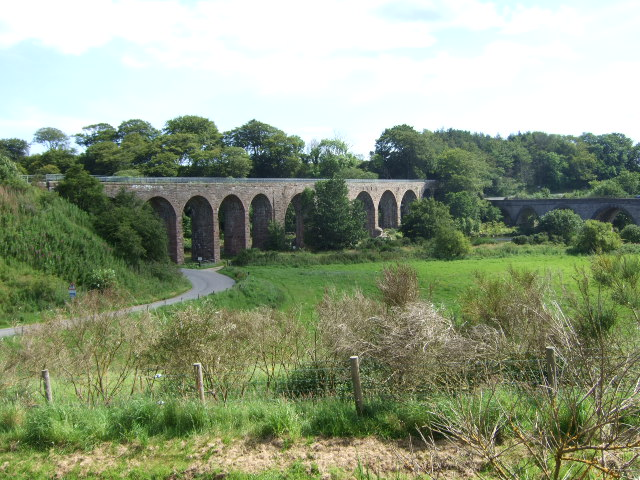
The bridge over the North Esk north of Montrose marks the border between Angus and Aberdeenshire.

== Culture ==
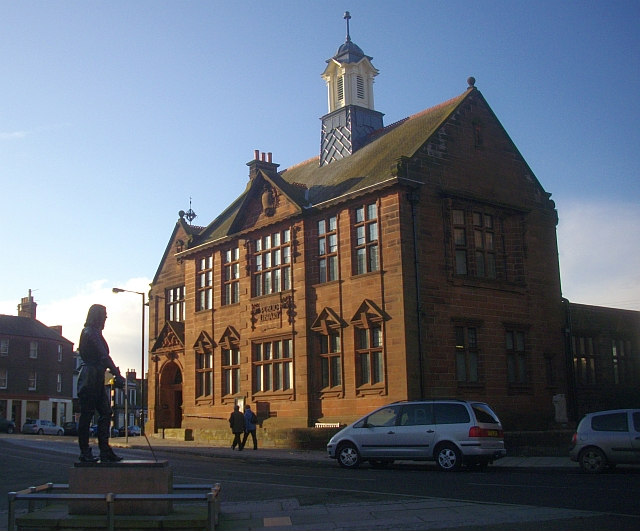
Montrose Library

=== Cultural history ===
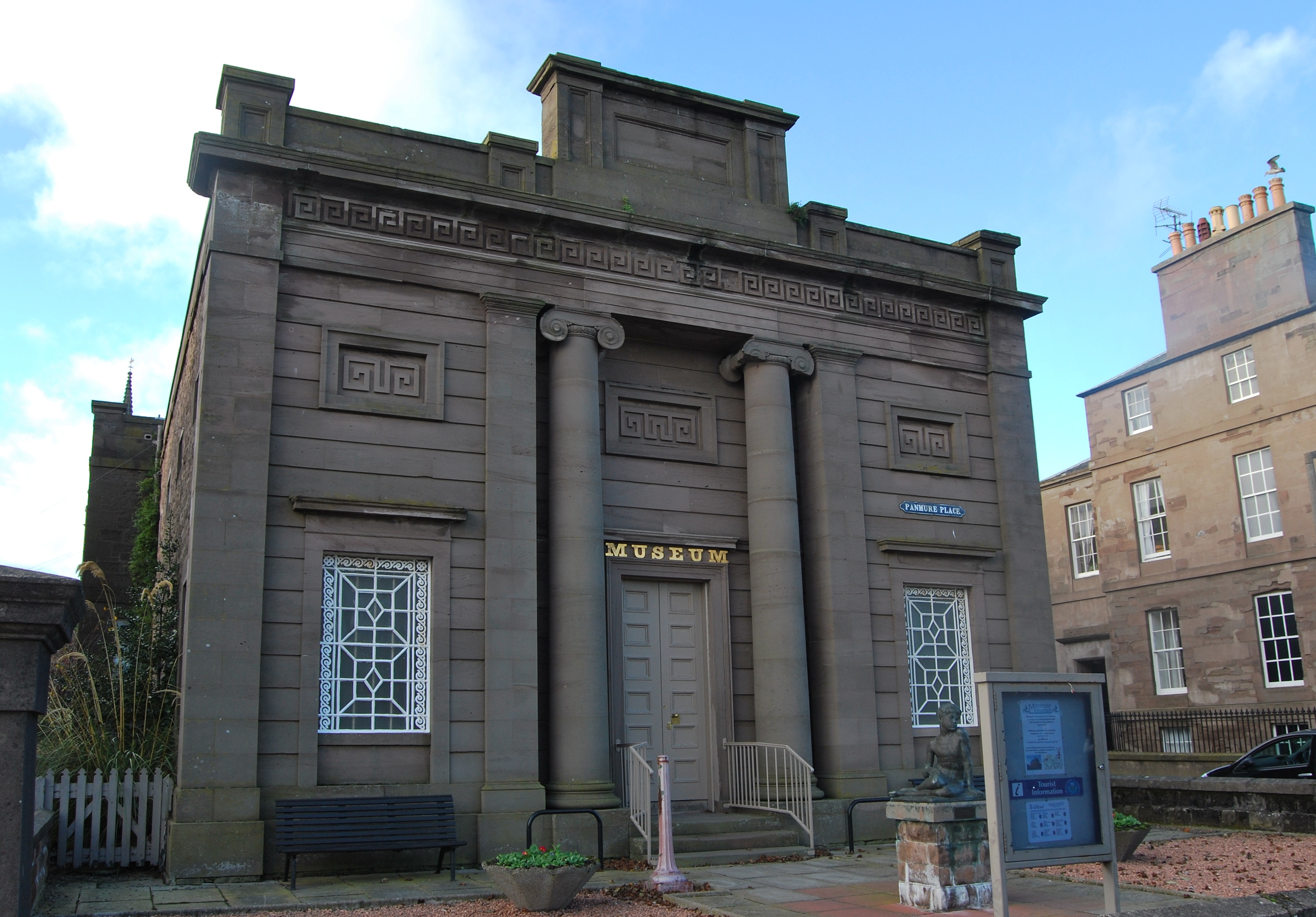
Montrose Museum

Montrose is regarded as the culture and sculpture capital of Angus, with over 20 statues of note scattered around the town. They are a mix of modern and classical works, with many by the local sculptor, William Lamb ARSA, an artist of exceptional talent. From the 1920s to 1940s local architect George Fairweather's studio provided a forum for lively debate by an artistic community that included Hugh MacDiarmid, Edwin Muir, William Lamb, Helen Cruickshank and Fionn MacColla. The local weekly newspaper, the Montrose Review, was edited by MacDiarmid.

=== Music ===
Since 2008 Montrose has hosted the Montrose Music Festival, or Mo Fest, which takes place each year at the end of May. It has become one of Scotland's biggest free live music festivals.

=== Film ===
The Montrose Playhouse is a community-led cinema and arts venue, which opened in 2021. Originally a historic swimming pool, the building has been transformed into a multi-purpose space that hosts film screenings, live performances and educational events. With the closing of the Belmont in Aberdeen it has now established itself as a leading cultural hub in the region, especially for independent cinema.

=== Sport ===
Montrose is also a qualifying course for The Open Championship. Past events hosted on the Montrose Links include:

- Scottish Professional Championship, 1909, 1967, 1970
- Scottish Amateur Championship, 1905, 1913, 1919, 1926 and 1925
- British Boys Championship, 1991; Scottish Universities Championship
- Final Qualifying for The Open, 1999 and 2007.

Links Park is home to three football teams:

- A senior side, Montrose F.C., who are members of the Scottish Football League and currently play in League One.
- A junior side, Montrose Roselea F.C., who play in the sixth tier of Scottish football.
- A women's side, Montrose W.F.C., who play in the Scottish Women's Premier League.

Other sports associations include the Montrose Cricket Club, Montrose Tennis Club, Montrose & District SEALS Swimming Club, Montrose & District Athletics, Montrose and District rugby union club, Montrose Sailing Club and several bowls clubs which are part of the Montrose & District Bowling Club Association.

Helen Matthews was a suffragette and woman footballer who was born in Montrose. She created the first-ever women's football team. This team beat England 3–1 in their second match in May 1881.

== Media ==
Television signals are received from either the Durris or Angus TV transmitters.

The radio stations that cover the area are BBC Radio Scotland which broadcast from the local opt in Dundee on 92.7 FM and Radio North Angus also broadcast on 87.7 FM.

Local newspapers are Montrose Review and The Courier.

== Religious sites ==
=== Christian groups ===
There are many churches in Montrose. Three belong to the Church of Scotland: Montrose Old and St Andrew's ('Auld Kirk'), Montrose: South and Ferryden, Dun and Hillside Church. There is one United Free Church: Knox Church. Grace Church Montrose is a new church plant belonging to the Free Church of Scotland. In the Links, there is an Episcopal Church (St Mary's and St Peter's); the United Reformed Church and Methodist Church are nearby. The Roman Catholic community is served by St Margaret's Roman Catholic Church. There is also a Baptist Church situated in Borrowfield. No Quaker group meets in the town, but meetings are held nearby in both Dundee and Aberdeen.

The most prominent church is the Old and St Andrew's Church, Montrose. Reverend Dr Charles Nisbet who became minister in 1764 described it as a church which "embraced much cultivation and intelligence".

=== Other groups ===
In Borrowfield there is an LDS Church and a Kingdom Hall of Jehovah's Witnesses lies on the edge of the town.

== Transport ==
The town is served by Montrose railway station, which is a stop on the Dundee–Aberdeen line. Services to Aberdeen, Glasgow Queen Street, Edinburgh Waverley, Dundee and Perth are operated by ScotRail; some London North Eastern Railway services to Aberdeen, Leeds and London King's Cross stop here.

Local bus services are operated predominantly by Stagecoach South Scotland. Key routes connect the town with Arbroath, Brechin and Dundee; the X7 Coastrider bus route between Aberdeen and Perth runs through the town.

== Public services ==
Montrose and the surrounding area is supplied with water by Scottish Water from the Lintrathen and Backwater reservoirs in Glen Isla. Electricity distribution is by Scottish Hydro Electric plc, part of the Scottish and Southern Energy group.

Waste management is handled by Angus Council. There is a kerbside recycling scheme that has been in operation since March 2005. Cans, glass, paper and plastic bottles are collected on a weekly basis. Compostable material and non-recyclable material are collected on alternate weeks. Roughly two-thirds of non-recyclable material is sent to landfill at Angus Council's site at Lochhead, Forfar and the remainder sent for incineration (with energy recovery) outside the council area.

A recycling centre is located at Broomfield Road. Items accepted include steel and aluminium cans, cardboard, paper, electrical equipment, engine oil, fridges and freezers, garden waste, gas bottles, glass, liquid food and drinks cartons, plastic bottles, plastic carrier bags, rubble, scrap metal, shoes and handbags, spectacles, textiles, tin foil, wood and Yellow Pages. Angus Council publishes details of where and how each product is processed. There are also glass banks at Tesco in Western Road and Scotmid in New Wynd, as well as a neighbourhood recycling point at Wharf Street. The Angus Council area had a recycling rate of 34.7% in 2007/08.

Healthcare is supplied in the area by NHS Tayside. The nearest hospital with accident and emergency departments is Ninewells Hospital, Dundee. Primary Health Care in Montrose is supplied by Castlegait Surgery, Townhead Practice and Annat Health Centre which are based at the Links Health Centre. Montrose, along with the rest of Scotland, is served by the Scottish Ambulance Service. Montrose Royal Infirmary, which had served as a community hospital, closed in April 2018.

Law enforcement is provided by Police Scotland. and Montrose is served by the Scottish Fire and Rescue Service.

== Notable people ==
=== 16th century ===
- John Erskine of Dun (1509–1591), Laird of Dun, Scottish religious reformer.
- George Wishart (1513–1546), Protestant reformer.
- Andrew Melville (1545–1622), scholar, theologian, poet and religious reformer. Participated in Knox's reformation in Scotland.

=== 17th century ===
- John Clerk of Pennycuik (1611–1674), merchant who maintained a comprehensive archive of family papers, now held by the National Archives of Scotland and the National Library of Scotland.
- James Graham, 1st Marquis of Montrose (1612–1650), poet, soldier, lord lieutenant and later viceroy and captain general of Scotland.
- David Erskine, Lord Dun (1670–1758), 13th Laird of Dun, advocate, judge and commissioner to the Scottish parliament. Commissioned William Adam to build the House of Dun. Opposed the Union.

=== 18th century ===
- James Brown (1734–1791), clergyman of the Scottish Episcopal Church. Held allegiance to the House of Stuart before and after 1788. Jacobite. Father of botanist Robert Brown, below.
- John Ewen (1741–1821), songwriter.
- Hercules Ross (1745–1816), merchant and abolitionist.
- William Paterson (1755–1810), soldier, explorer, Lieutenant Governor and botanist
- David Carnegie (1772–1837), entrepreneur & banker. Founded Carnegie Investment Bank.
- Robert Brown (1773–1858), botanist, who discovered Brownian motion.
- Joseph Hume (1777–1855), doctor and politician.

=== 19th century ===
- Horatio Ross (1801–1886), sportsman, photographer & politician. Son of Hercules Ross.
- Captain Sir Alexander Burnes (1805–1841), explorer.
- Alexander Allan (1809–1891), locomotive engineer. Invented the balanced slide valve, & the straight-link valve gear.
- James Strachan (1810–1875), merchant, grazier and politician in Victoria, Australia.
- John Taylor (1816–1881), merchant and politician in Nova Scotia.
- David Luckie (1827–1909), journalist and politician
- Allan Octavian Hume (1829–1912), a political reformer, ornithologist and botanist who worked in British India. He has been called "the Father of Indian Ornithology".
- George Paul Chalmers (1833–1878), landscape, seascape, portrait and interior painter.
- James Blyth (1838–1906), was an early pioneer of wind power who built the world's first wind turbine that generated electricity in 1887, although it lacked a control mechanism (later developed by the American Charles F. Brush)
- Henry Renny-Tailyour (1849–1920), sportsman representing Scotland in some of the earliest international football and rugby union matches. Born in India, he spent his childhood on the family estate at Newmanswalls.
- William Barclay Peat (1852–1936), accountant, a founder of KPMG.
- Helen Matthews (1857/8 – ?), suffragette and women's footballer. Created the first ever women's football team. This team beat England 3–1 in their second match ever in May 1881.
- Violet Jacob (1863–1946), writer & poet, known especially for her historical novel Flemington.
- Charles Burgess (1873–1961), professional golfer and footballer.
- Commander E. C. Shankland (1880–1951), naval officer and harbour expert.
- Helen Cruickshank (1886–1975), poet.
- Willa Muir (1890–1970), feminist novelist, academic and pioneering translator into English of major works by Franz Kafka.
- Hugh MacDiarmid (1892–1978), poet, and sometime editor and reporter of local newspaper, the Montrose Review. Considered a principal force in the Scottish Renaissance. Founding member of the National Party of Scotland in 1928.
- William Lamb (1893–1951), sculptor and artist.

=== 20th century ===
- Edward Baird (1904–1949), artist.
- Fionn MacColla (1906–1975), novelist closely connected with the Scottish Renaissance. Founding member of the National Party of Scotland in 1928.
- Gordon Burness (1906–1989), footballer
- Betsy Whyte (1919–1988), a Scottish traveller, singer and storyteller. Author of a two-part biography Yellow on the Broom and Red Rowans and Wild Honey detailing growing up as a traveller in rural Scotland between the First and Second World Wars. Recordings of her performances are held in the University of Edinburgh.
- Ernie Copland (1924–1971), footballer who played for Arbroath, Dundee and Raith Rovers. He was selected for Scotland's 1954 FIFA World Cup squad, but did not travel to the finals and never played for the national side.
- Gordon Smith (1924–2004), footballer. Only player to have won a Scottish league championship with three clubs.
- James Morrison (1932 – 2020), artist.
- Malcolm Duncan (1945–2019), tenor saxophonist and founding member of the Average White Band.
- John McGovern (b. 1949), football player and manager. Captained the Nottingham Forest side that won the European Cup twice.
- Michael Forsyth, Baron Forsyth of Drumlean (born 1954), a British financier and Conservative politician, who was the Member of Parliament (MP) for Stirling from 1983 to 1997 and served in the cabinet of John Major as Secretary of State for Scotland from 1995 to 1997.
- Anthony Baxter (born 1982), a documentary director and producer known for Eye of the Storm, Flint: Who Can You Trust?, You've Been Trumped and A Dangerous Game.
- Sam Grove-White (born 1992), a professional rugby union referee and the thirteenth Scot to receive an international referee cap from the Scottish Rugby Union. He regularly officiates in the URC and the EPCR Champions Cup and Challenge Cup. Previously, he officiated at the World Rugby Sevens Series, the Commonwealth Games and at the 2020 Summer Olympics.

=== 21st century ===
- Shona Campbell (born 2001), a professional rugby player for Scotland and Sale Sharks who grew up and began playing rugby in Montrose. She represented Scotland at the Birmingham 2022 Commonwealth Games and Great Britain in the World Rugby SVNS series.

== Twin towns ==
Montrose has been twinned with Luzarches, France, since 1994.

== Legacy ==
The town gives its name to the neighborhood of Montrose in Houston, United States.

Walter Scott's A Legend of Montrose is set during the Earl of Montrose's 1644–45 military campaign in Scotland. Montrose, Colorado, United States takes its name from this book.

In J.K. Rowling's Harry Potter universe, there is a professional Quidditch team from the township of Montrose: The Montrose Magpies.

Two Royal Navy ships have been named HMS Montrose after the Duke of Montrose.

== See also ==
- RAF Montrose
- House of Dun
- Montrose Air Station Heritage Centre
