= Montrose Academy =

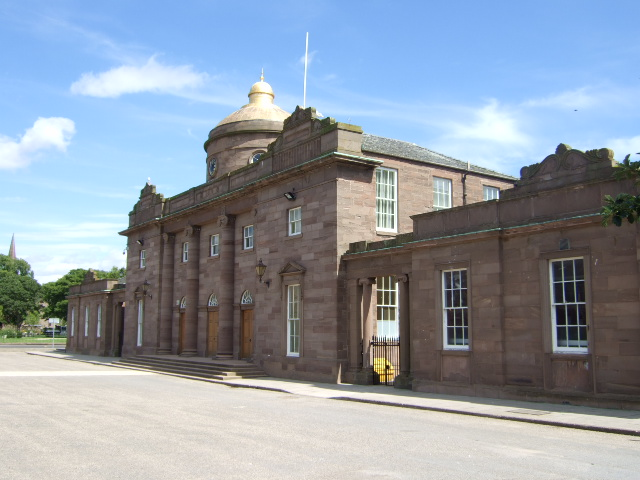

Location
- Academy Square; Montrose, Angus, DD10 8HU; Scotland; 56°42′33″N 2°27′47″W

Information
- Type: Comprehensive School
- Motto: Semper Sursum (Latin); Always aim high
- Established: 1815; 211 years ago
- Local authority: Angus
- Rector: Malcolm Smart
- Staff: 79
- Age: 11 to 18
- Enrolment: 1917
- Houses: Dun; Esk; Lunan; Burnes; Kinnaber
- Colour
- Feeder schools: List: Borrowfield Primary School; Ferryden Primary School; Lochside Primary School; Rosemount Primary School; St Margaret's R.C. Primary School; Southesk Primary School
- Website: https://www.montroseacademy.co.uk/

Montrose Academy is a coeducational secondary school in Montrose Angus. The School now teaches pupils from ages 11–18.

It became a comprehensive school in the mid-fifties and was one of a pair of Scottish schools which formed a country-wide trial of comprehensive schooling in Scotland. It serves the surrounding local community with a roll of around 900 students and a staff of 79. Most pupils come from the associated primary schools of Borrowfield, Ferryden, Lochside, Rosemount, Southesk and St Margaret's. A number of pupils come from outside the catchment area.

== History ==
=== The Grammar School ===
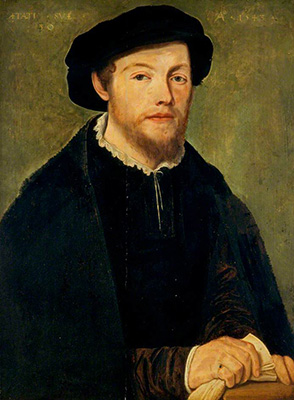
George Wishart, who taught Greek at the school

The earliest evidence of schooling in Montrose was in 1329 when Robert the Bruce gave twenty shillings to "David of Montrose in aid of the schools". The name of John Cant or Kant, appears on a deed dated 26 September 1492 as "Master of Arts and Rector of the Parish Church of Logy in Montrose Parish" and is believed to be an early record of a public school in the Montrose area. The grammar school was founded in the 16th century, although the precise date of establishment is unknown. Originally the grammar school was established close to the parish church and it was a requirement of the schoolmaster to read lessons in the church, although the practice was waning by the late eighteenth century.

The Grammar School of Montrose is reputed to have been the first school in Scotland to teach Classical Greek. This was made possible when John Erskine of Dun, the then Provost of Montrose and patron of the school, brought Pierre de Marsilliers to Scotland in 1534 and founded a Greek school. Other teachers from France followed. The introduction of Greek at Montrose is understood to have hastened the Reformation in Scotland. In the 1530s the Protestant reformer, George Wishart began to teach at the school. Wishart came to be known as "the Schoolmaster of Montrose". He taught and circulated copies of the Greek Testament amongst his pupils and fled to England in 1538 when investigated for heresy by William Chisholm, the then Bishop of Brechin. It is likely that on his return to Scotland he taught John Knox Greek before returning to teach in Montrose in 1544.

The grammar school was renowned enough as a seminary to attract such distinguished men as James Melville (1556–1614) and his uncle, Andrew Melville. Andrew Melville was taught Latin at the grammar school by Schoolmaster Thomas Anderson. He studied the original Greek of Aristotle under Pierre de Marsilliers in 1557 before passing to the University of St Andrews in 1559. His proficiency in Greek astonished the professors there who had no knowledge of the language. Melville later became a noted theologian and distinguished scholar of Classical Greek and Latin.

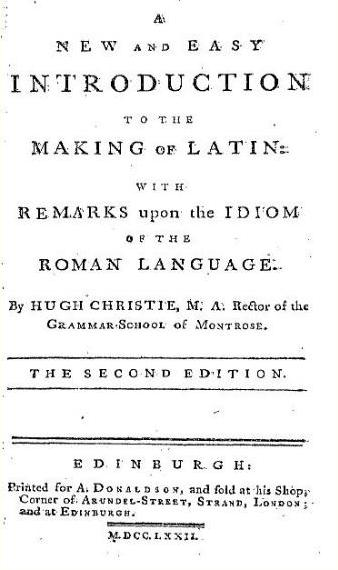
Hugh Christie, the first rector of the Grammar School, published textbooks on Latin.

James Melville studied at Montrose in 1569 under the tutelage of Mr Andrew Milne. Melville rehearsed Calvin's Catechisms and read Virgil's Georgics amongst other works. He used these words to describe his years of instruction:

" The maister of the scholl, was a lerned, honest, kynd man, whom also for thankfulness I name, Mr. Andro Miln. I never got a stroke of his hand; howbeit, I committed twa stupid faults, as it were with fire and sword :—Having the candle in my hand, on a winter night, before six o'clock, in the school, sitting in the class, bairnly and negligently playing with the bent, with which the floor was strewed, it kindled, so that we had much ado to put it out with our feet. The other was being molested by a condisciple, who cut the strings of my pen and ink-horn with his pen-knife; I aiming with my pen-knife to his legs to fley him; he feared, and lifting now a leg and now the other, rushed on his leg upon my knife, and struck himself a deep wound in the shin of the leg, which was a quarter of a year in curing. In the time of the trying of the matter, he saw me so humble, so feared, so grieved, yield so many tears, and by fasting and mourning at the school all day, that he said he could not find in his heart to punish me farther. But my righteous God let me not slip that fault, but gave me a warning, and remembrance what it was to be denied with blood, although negligently; for within a short space, after I had caused a cutler, newly come to the town, to polish and sharp the same pen-knife, and had bought a pennyworth of apples, and cutting and eating the same in the links, as I put the slice in my mouth, I began to lope up upon a little sand brae, having the pen-knife in my right hand, I fell, and struck myself, missing my belly, an inch deep in the inward side of the left knee, even to the bean, whereby the equity of God's judgment, and my conscience struck me so, that I was the more wary of knives all my days."

George Gledstanes was master in 1586–7, a teacher of languages and Reader in the parish church. David Lindsay was appointed master around 1594 before becoming master at Dundee Grammar School. He was followed by James Lichton, appointed in 1614. Alexander Petrie, made master in 1622, received a salary of 25 merks per quarter for Candlemass, Lamass, and Hallowmass. Robert Graham became master in August 1638 and remained until 1644. By this time the school was increasing in numbers and an assistant master was employed in 1639. Succeeding Graham were William Clyd (6 May 1643 – 8 November 1643); John Nicol (1643–1645); John Cargill (1645-July 1656) and John Strachan (22 September 1656 – 1659). James Wishart was master from 1659 until his death in 1684. William Langmuir or Langmoor was appointed on 2 January 1684 and was in his post until 1704, when Robert Strachan took over as master. In 1686 a library was established at the Grammar School, which contained a number of rare books. On 28 June 1710 Robert Spence became master, then James Stewart in 1717 and Patrick Renny on 16 June 1725. Hugh Christie, on 10 June 1752, was the first headmaster of the school to be granted the title "rector". His successor David Valentyne was rector from 20 July 1766 until 19 October 1806.

In the first quarter of the eighteenth century, an "English School" opened in the town. The school taught music, French, writing, arithmetic, book-keeping, geometry and navigation. By the late eighteenth century, the old Grammar School was in ruins. Construction of the 'New Schools', designed by Andrew Barrie, commenced in 1787 and was completed the following year. The buildings were constructed on the Mid Links, an area of parkland in the town, and contained separate accommodation for the Grammar School, English School and Writing School. Between the ruin of the old Grammar School and the building of the 'New Schools', the Grammar School operated from rooms in the Town House.

The teaching of French is noted in the early history of the Grammar School; German was not taught until the beginning of the nineteenth century. Painting was introduced as a subject in 1816.

The educational establishment in Montrose was one of the most renowned burgh schools in Scotland which provided a preparatory education for university study. It was especially well regarded in teaching classics.

=== Montrose Academy ===
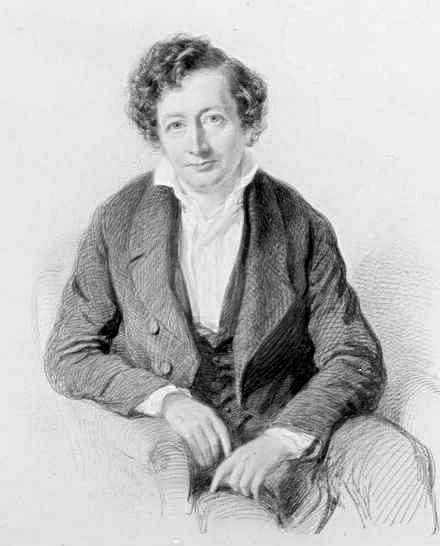
John Pringle Nichol, former rector

The new Montrose Academy was founded in 1815. It was partly funded by public subscription funds of £1350, adding to £1000 from Montrose Town Council. Built close to the site of the former grammar school, the foundation stone was laid on 27 February or 15 March 1815 by Mrs Ford of Finhaven. It existed alongside other schools including White's Free School and the local trades school, and had the largest attendance.

Montrose Academy is seen to have replaced the ancient Grammar School of Montrose which had established itself during the 16th century and absorbed all other existing burgh schools in the area. Its inception as an academy was part of a broader 18th century development in the Scottish school system towards the inclusion of more practical subjects such as navigation, drawing, arithmetic and book-keeping, alongside the traditional tuition of the Classics. This was seen in other Scottish provincial towns and reflected a commitment to learning which was "rooted in the past, but re-energized and adapted" due to the effects of urban growth and the rise of a commercial elite. Academies were concentrated in the industrial towns of the east. The wide curricular provision was such that an 1866 report complained that "Classics do not occupy a prominent place, and nothing else has been substituted in the way of sound and systematic training".

Academies were initially supplementary but eventually superseded the old grammar schools, as had occurred in Montrose. The foundation of Montrose Academy came 55 years after that of the very first academy in Perth in 1760. The pupils were required to pay fees, which funded teachers' salaries. Sometimes, as in the case of James Mill, poor boys were sponsored by local ministers or benevolent landowners. In the mid-nineteenth century, a bequest left by John Erskine of Saint James Parish, Jamaica to the sum of £3000, provided education for eight orphaned boys.

Around 1815 James Calvert was rector of the Grammar School. John Rintoul taught Reading and Grammar, James Norval taught Grammar and Geography, Robert Baird and William Beattie taught Writing and Arithmetic, and Robert Munro taught drawing. As was commonly practiced at the time, James Calvert had 20-30 pupils boarding in his house between 1815 and 1820. The first rector of Montrose Academy after it was formally established is said to have been called Johnston. John Pringle Nichol was rector from 1828 to 1834 and was qualified to teach Classical Literature, English Literature, French, German, Italian, Spanish, Geography, History, Natural History, Geology, Astronomy, Chemistry, Natural Philosophy, Anatomy, Physiology, Animal Mechanics, Moral Philosophy and Political Economy. He was later appointed Professor of Astronomy at the University of Glasgow in 1836, finding fame through his essays and lectures.

In 1832 the Montrose Grammar School building was acquired by the Board of Health for use as a cholera hospital, resulting in the transfer of teachers to Montrose Academy. The 1841 Census reveals that Rev. Alexander Stewart was rector of Montrose Academy while James Calvert was "Rector of the Grammar School". It is evident that both schools existed as independent institutions but within the same building. Yet by 1846 it is clear that Montrose Academy had come to replace the old Grammar School, and it is mentioned as the prominent educational institution in the town. There was no formalised leadership of the school for some time. In 1845, the second Statistical Account recorded that the rector of the school taught mathematics, geography and French and that there were two teachers of English; two teachers of writing and arithmetic and two for Latin. The school was then attended by 347 pupils. By the mid-nineteenth century, the staff consisted of the rector, the rector's assistant, four masters and a mistress. Staff from around this time include Alexander Madoland (Drawing Master from 1843 to 1881); and Alex Monfries (English Master in 1867). Reading of the Bible was considered an obligatory part of learning.

Montrose Academy remained a burgh school until 1872 when it was designated "a higher class public school" and the best in its region because it was an exclusive fee-paying school which provided higher instruction in such subjects as Latin, Greek, modern languages, mathematics and natural science. The 1872 Education Act transferred management of all burgh schools from town councils to elected school boards. Montrose Academy received £300 annually, on the condition that it admitted 25 free scholars by examination. From 1888 further reform brought in a Scottish leaving certificate, to be examined by university professors. Girls and boys were taught together in Latin classes. In 1895, girls were particularly proficient in German classes and boys often pursued the study of Medicine. Montrose Academy continued to provide preparatory education until the mid-twentieth century. The intake then was predominantly middle class.

=== Extension ===
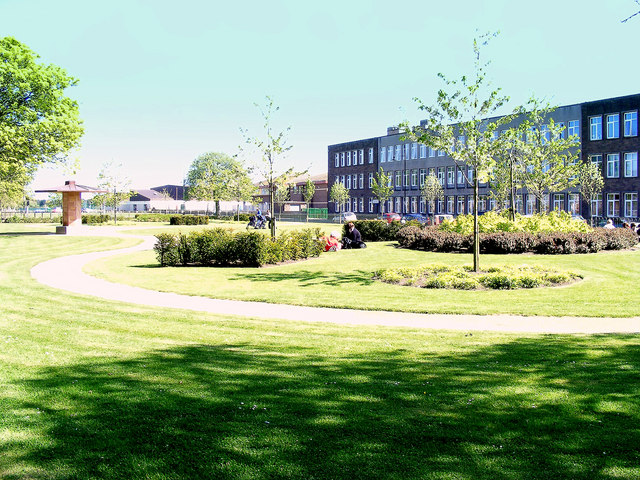
Montrose Academy seen from Scott's Park with modern extensions in view

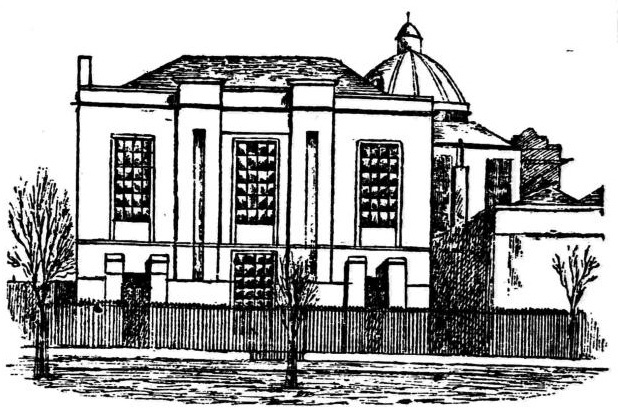
Side elevation of Montrose Academy in 1898, showing the recently added Dorward's Seminary building

An endowment in 1891 provided facilities for a new science and art school. In 1898, after the closure of Dorward's Seminary, its building was renovated, extended and added to Montrose Academy. This provided a new assembly hall, and allowed space to complete a new gymnasium, which at the time was one of the largest in Scotland. Tuition of the classics continued into the later nineteenth and early twentieth centuries. The curriculum expanded at the beginning of the twentieth century to include more scientific subject matter. By 1900 gymnastics and swimming were introduced to the curriculum. In 1895, the school was described as having two separate entrances for boys and girls. The classrooms were heated with open fires during the winter and the walls were decorated with pictures, photographs and maps gifted by former pupils. There was also a preparatory school attached - Montrose Academy Elementary School, which existed until the 1970s. In 1932 the local Townhead School, which taught commercial and technical subjects, became part of Montrose Academy. It was fully amalgamated by the 1950s.

Universal secondary education was enacted in 1936 but schools were split on a meritocratic basis, between "junior secondary schools" leading to no qualifications and "senior secondary schools", like Montrose Academy, where pupils would earn a leaving certificate and university entrance. Montrose Academy eventually became a state school in 1965 after the introduction of comprehensive schools throughout Scotland.

Montrose Academy is a community school, and its catchment area extends to the surrounding villages of Craigo, Hillside and Ferryden. The feeder schools are Borrowfield Primary School, Ferryden Primary School, Lochside Primary School, Southesk Primary School, St Margaret's Primary School and Rosemount.

=== Building ===
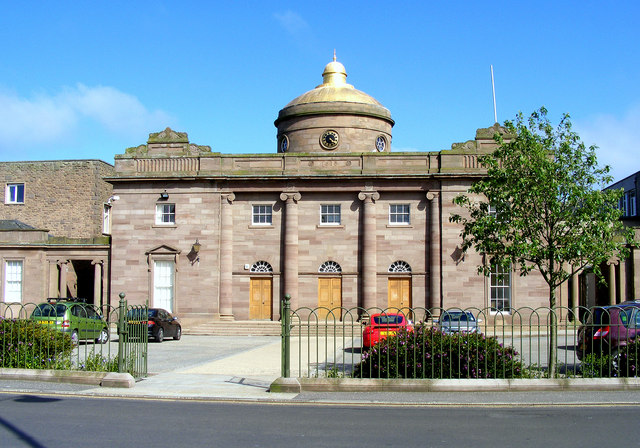
Montrose Academy Front Block

The original Montrose Academy building, designed by David Logan is connected to its wings by screens of Ionic columns which were added in 1841 and were designed to harmonise with the existing frontage. The distinctive facade is the only part of the original building to survive but is a fine example of Scottish architecture in the Neo-Classical style. It has been Category B listed since 1971 by Historic Scotland.

The original 1815 building contained three classrooms on the ground floor, and three on the floor above with a room contained within the dome. The 1841 addition of two ground floor wings situated north and south of the original facade, provided more space for teaching.

Further improvements were made during the twentieth century expansion of the school. After World War II Montrose Academy's copper dome was covered in gold leaf as a war memorial, paid for by Miss Blanche Mearns. In the 1960s two memorials were added to the east exterior wall of the Assembly Hall, bearing the names of former students who had died in both world wars.

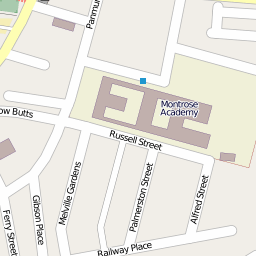
Montrose Academy building from above

In 1955 plans were unveiled for new buildings to be added to the old Montrose Academy. Houses in the Academy Square were demolished and £250,000 set aside. The 1961 extension, officially declared open on 23 October of that year, brought into use two three-storey blocks attached to the 1841 additions. The major work of the last Extension in 1988-89 was the building of the East Wing, a two-storey block linked to the old West Wing by walkways. It contains a number of teaching areas in addition to a Library, Communications Studio, Social Areas and Dining Room. In 2000, the 'Millenium Garden' was developed in the West Wing courtyard.

The most recent significant alterations were made in 2006. The East Annexe building which was once the Montrose Academy Elementary has been demolished. It housed the Drama and Music departments which have since been relocated to the main building. Music is now taught in the West Wing and Drama in the East Wing. During this relocation improvements were made to classroom space for IT, Drama and Music. In addition, £64,000 was spent on updating Home Economics classrooms. Science labs were refurbished in 2010.

=== Rectors of Montrose Academy ===
Former Rector John Strong (1868–1945), who later became Rector of the Royal High School, Edinburgh then professor of education at the University of Leeds, wrote about the history of Montrose Academy. His son, Sir Kenneth Strong (1900–1982), who attended the school, was a Major-General in the British Army, commander of Royal Scots Fusiliers in North Africa, Chief of Intelligence for U.S. General Dwight D. Eisenhower and Director-General of Intelligence for Ministry of Defence (1964–66).

Known rectors of Montrose Academy
#	Name	Date recorded
1	Johnston	1815-22
2	John Pringle Nichol	1828–1834
3	Rev. Alexander Stewart	1837–1841
4	James Anderson	1847-1848
5	Charles B. Smith	1852–1880
8	James Stobo	1880–1891
9	David Campbell	1891–1899
10	Dr John Strong	1900–1914
11	George A. Burnett	1914–1919
12	John Yorston	1919–1928
13	David W. Cameron	1928-1950
14	Dr George Howie	1950-
15	Harold Cranswick	
16	William Harold "Harry" Faulkner	1990s-1997
17	George Stachura	1997–2008
18	Ronald Small	2008-2011
19	Dr. John B. Cavanagh	2011-2017
20	Malcolm Smart	2017-

=== Former teachers ===
- the religious reformer George Wishart (1513–46)
- the astronomer John Pringle Nichol (1804–1859)

== Organisation ==
Green recycling facilities were set up around the school in 2009. It has become the first Fairtrade school in Angus.

=== Structure ===
Montrose Academy is headed by the rector and three deputy rectors. The school departments are Business Education and Computing, English, Expressive Arts (Art, Drama, Music), Health (Home Economics, Physical Education), Mathematics, Modern Languages (French, German, Spanish), Social Subjects (Geography, History, Modern Studies, Religious Education), Science (Biology, Chemistry, Physics), Support for Learning and Technical Education (Craft and Design, Graphic Communication and Technological Studies). Each department is headed by a Principal Teacher. There are a number of technical and support staff. The school is divided organisationally into the Junior School (S1-S3) and Senior School (S4-S6).

=== Pastoral care ===
A 2004 inspector's report noted that the school was "very welcoming". In general the school aims to foster the potential of each individual child as part of a holistic approach to education. It issues a code of conduct which states that pupils should be punctual and considerate of others; behave sensibly; dress appropriately for school; use their common sense; be prepared for class and work hard. Though the school is non-denominational it arranges for four chaplains from local churches, both Protestant and Catholic, to occasionally take assemblies. But reserves the right of parents to withdraw their children from instruction in religious subjects. All year groups have classes in "Social Education" which focuses on health, moral issues, personal and careers development. Careers Officers in the school provide advice on academic decision-making. The school provides clothing grants and bursaries to those in financial need.

A 2010 Inspectors' Report noted the school's strengths in supporting children during the transition from primary to secondary school, and the involvement of its pupils in fundraising activities. However it stated that "a number of young people" were unhappy about how the school dealt with poor behaviour and bullying.

== Academics ==
=== Performance ===
The strongest academic performance has been in Biology, Chemistry and Physics. The number of students progressing to university is generally consistent with the national average and in 2010 was above the national average. In 2007 it was ranked 272 in Scotland for Standard Grade exam results from around 460 state schools. Standard Grade and Higher pass rates since 2008 have dropped slightly below the national average. However numbers passing Advanced Higher level examinations were above the national average for 2010. The 2010 report noted that pupils in the Senior School tended to perform less well and that "at all stages, young people could attain and achieve more".

School attendance is above the national average.

=== Curriculum ===
Montrose Academy follows the Scottish education system and the Curriculum for Excellence. In S1-S2 pupils take courses from all departments. From S3 pupils are still given a broad education but are allowed electives in the expressive arts, social sciences and other electives. This prepares them to choose 4 subjects, not including Maths and English which are mandatory, to take in S4 usually at a National 5 level. Pupils in the Senior School choose 5 from a range of Higher grade subjects where Advanced Highers (a maximum of 3) can be taken in S6. However teaching of Advanced Highers is less comprehensive. In 2009 Angus Council announced that it was dropping Advanced Higher Business Management, History and Modern Studies from the curriculum. However this was not enforced as pupils are still learning those subjects currently. Pupils in the Senior School are able to study Higher Psychology through day classes at Angus College.

=== Academic prizes ===
The school awards the Dux medal yearly, an award which has been said to have been first instituted in honour of Alexander Burnes; the medal itself is inscribed with the name of James Burnes (1801–1862), whose brother Alexander (1805–1841) was killed in Afghanistan. The Dux medal has been awarded since at least 1896 but possibly for much longer - the medal is inscribed 'Jacobo Burnes Indiam Relinquit MDCCCXLIX' and 'Academiae Montis Rosarum Fratres Latomi Bombaiensis' which suggests that the original medal was presented to James Burnes on leaving India in 1849 by brother freemasons from Montrose Academy living in Bombay. Other long-standing prizes include the Warrack Essay Prize (gifted by Sir James Howard Warrack), Duke Medal (for Mathematics) and the Henry Steele Prize (awarded for History). A number of prizes are sponsored by local businesses and organisations. School Colours are awarded for representation of the school at a national level in sport or other activities.

=== Educational links ===
In 2006 links were established with a new sister school in China following the twinning of Angus with Yantai City. Twinning arrangements have been made in other Angus schools, Webster's High School and Brechin High School. It is hoped that these ties will enable the teaching of Mandarin Chinese as part of future plans. From 2010 Montrose Rotary Club is working to establish links between the school and Lawson Academy in Nyumbani, Kitui District, Kenya, a village created to accommodate HIV orphans and grandparents affected by a high incidence of AIDS in the region.

=== Exchange programmes ===
Students studying German can take part in an exchange with Icking Gymnasium in Icking, Bavaria. Since 2007 an exchange programme has been running between Montrose Academy and Forest Park High School in Virginia, United States.

== Activities ==
Student activities include the Baroque Ensemble, Book Group, Breakfast Club, cheerleading, Chess Club, Craft Club, Drama Club, Duke of Edinburgh Award, Fairtrade Group, fantasy football, Green Group, Montrose Academy Musical Association, Montrose Academy Rock Challenge Team, Pottery, Samba Band, School Choir, Spanish Club, War Games Club, XL Club, Young Enterprise and Zumba.

Montrose Academy has a debating society and has entered teams into the Scottish National Youth Parliament Competition. The school won the competition in 2005 and 2006. The English Department runs an annual debating competition for pupils in the Junior School where the winning team is entered into The Courier and Chartered Institute of Bankers in Scotland Schools Junior Debating Competition. The school's debating society participated in the STV schools referendum debates 2014, placing 3rd overall.

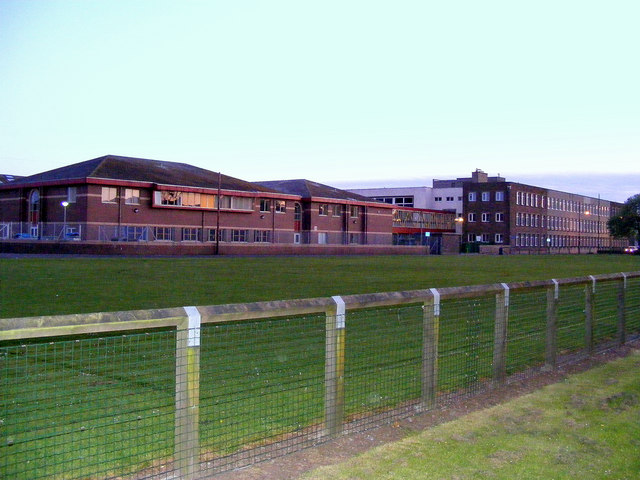
Part of Montrose Academy's playing fields

There are small gymnasia inside the school and playing grounds outside. The facilities of the adjacent Sports Centre are used by the school for physical education classes. A new swimming pool is being built attached to the Sports Centre; work started in 2011 and the project will be completed by October 2012. During this time improvements are being made at Montrose Academy including the installation of a small gym, new flooring, changing rooms and showers to the cost of £140,000.

=== Other activities ===
Pupils at Montrose Academy are involved in voting in the Rose Queen (and her attendants) who have been crowned at the annual Montrose Highland Games since 1968.

== Alumni ==
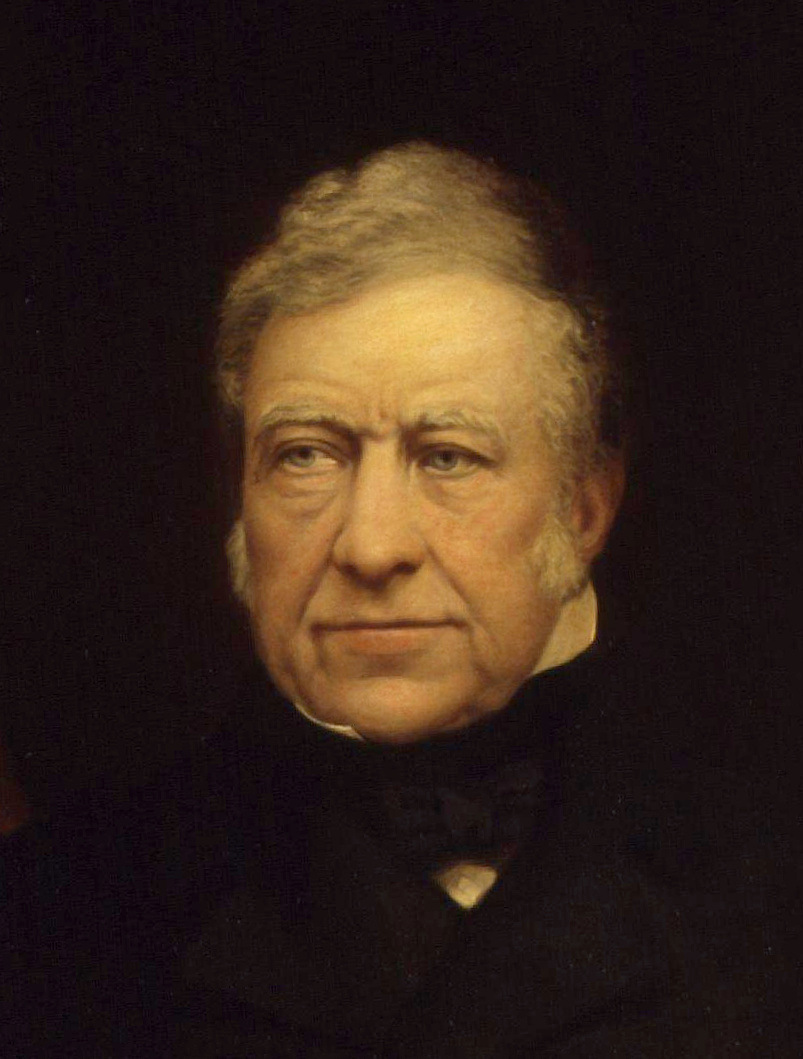
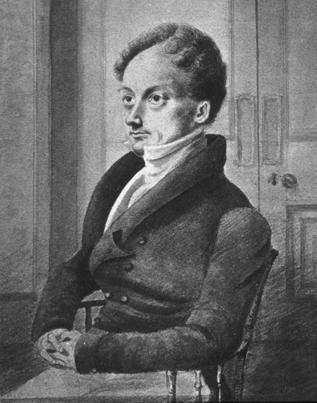
Joseph Hume (left) and James Mill became lifelong friends after meeting at Montrose Grammar School.
- the botanist Robert Brown (1773–1858),
- politician Joseph Hume (1777–1855), and James Mill (1773–1836) historian, economist, political theorist, and philosopher attended the school during the same period.
- Alexander Gibson, (1800–1867) surgeon and botanist
- the poet Alexander Smart (b.1798), satirised the teaching methods of James Norval at Montrose Academy in his poem, "Recollections of Auld Lang Syne".
- Edward Balfour, (1813–1889) was a surgeon, orientalist and pioneering environmentalist. * Captain Sir Alexander Burnes (1805–41), traveller and explorer also had connections with India
- A number of former pupils are connected with the Scottish Renaissance cultural movement of the early twentieth century. This includes the writers John Angus (1906–1968), Fionn MacColla and Willa Muir (1890–1970) (wife of Edwin Muir);
- Sir James Davidson Stuart Cameron (1900-1969), Director of Post Graduate Medicine, Dacca
- the poets Helen Cruickshank (1886–1975) and Hugh MacDiarmid (1892–1978)
- the artists Edward Baird (1904–49) and William Lamb (1893–1951).
- William Allen Neilson (1869–1946), writer and Professor of English.;
- James Simpson Silver (1913–1997), former James Watt Chair of Mechanical Engineering from 1967 to 1979 at the University of Glasgow; and Professor of Mechanical Engineering from 1962 to 1966 at Heriot-Watt University
- Arthur James Beattie (1914–1996), Professor of Greek from 1951 to 1981 at the University of Edinburgh, and fellow and lecturer in Greek and Classics at Sidney Sussex College, University of Cambridge (1946–51);
- Robert Cormack (1946-), Professor of Sociology and Pro-Vice-Chancellor (1996–2001) of the Queen's University of Belfast.
- gynaecologist John Chassar Moir (1900–1977), Nuffield Professor of Obstetrics and Gynæcology from 1937 to 1967 at the University of Oxford, and who led research in the 1930s which resulted in the discovery of ergometrine.
- electrical engineer James Blyth (1838–1906), was an early pioneer of wind power who built the world's first wind turbine that generated electricity in 1887, although lacked a control mechanism (later developed by the American Charles F. Brush)
- Major General George Alexander Renny (1825–1887) received the Victoria Cross.
- accountant William Barclay Peat (1852–1936) studied law at Montrose Academy, whose firm founded in 1870 became Peat Marwick, and later the worldwide firm KPMG in 1987 when it merged with the Dutch firm KMG
- footballer Gordon Smith (1924–2004) who played for Hibernian F.C.
- Sir Alan Rothnie, Ambassador to Saudi Arabia from 1972 to 1976, and to Switzerland from 1976 to 1980
- Sam Grove-White (born 1992), a professional rugby union referee and the thirteenth Scot to receive an international referee cap from the Scottish Rugby Union who has officiated in the URC, the EPCR Champions Cup and Challenge Cup, the World Rugby Sevens Series, the Commonwealth Games and at the 2020 Summer Olympics.

== See also ==
- List of the oldest schools in the United Kingdom
