= Government College for Women Shahrah-e-Liaquat =

School in Karachi

- گورنمنٹ کالج برائے خواتین شاہراہِ لیاقت
- Former names: Vasant Pathshala School (1917–1920); Carneiro Indian Girls High School (1920–1949); Central Government College for Women, Karachi (1949–1962)
- Type: Public women's college
- Established: 1917; 109 years ago
- Founders: Hirdaram Mewaram; Jamshed Nusserwanjee Mehta
- Affiliations: Board of Intermediate Education Karachi; University of Karachi
- Academic staff: 80+
- Students: 4,620+
- Location: Karachi, Sindh, Pakistan
- Campus: Urban, Burns Road

Government College for Women Shahrah-e-Liaquat (Urdu: گورنمنٹ کالج برائے خواتین شاہراہِ لیاقت), formerly known as Vasant Pathshala School, Carneiro Indian Girls High School, and the Central Government College for Women, Karachi, is a public women's college located on Shahrah-e-Liaquat, off Burns Road, in Karachi, Sindh, Pakistan. Founded in 1917, the college operates under the provincial Directorate of College Education and offers intermediate and undergraduate programs in the sciences, commerce, and arts. The college publishes a magazine titled Horizon.

== History ==
It was founded as Vasant Pathshala School in 1917 by Hirdaram Mewaram and Jamshed Nusserwanjee Mehta under the auspices of the Female Education Society of Karachi, with the aim of providing schooling to girls in the city. Both Hindu and Muslim community members contributed financially to the school's construction, and a place of worship, Guru Nanik Darbar, was built on its premises by SH Totibai Gobindar Mirani. The founding teaching staff, led by Sybil D'Abreo, later founder of Jufelhurst School, was sent to Bombay College in present-day Mumbai for teacher training and subsequently donated funds to upgrade the school to college level.

In 1920, Vasant Pathshala School was merged with Carneiro Indian Girls High School, another school founded by Rupchand Bilaram, and a new combined building was inaugurated in 1933 under the name Carneiro Indian Girls High School.. A separate college, Vishindevi Naraindas Maha Kenya Vidyalaya Inter College, was established on the same premises in 1936.

Following the Partition of British India in 1947, the institution remained closed for two years before being reopened by the Government of Pakistan on 1 June 1949 as the Central Government College for Women, the first girls' college placed under the administrative control of Ministry of Education. Its first principal, Zeenat Rasheed Ahmed, was appointed through the Federal Public Service Commission and recruited the initial 17 teachers and 150 students. In 1962, administrative control was transferred to the Government of Sindh and the institution was renamed Government College for Women.

== Academics ==
The college is affiliated with the Board of Intermediate Education Karachi for its intermediate-level programs and with the University of Karachi for its undergraduate offerings. Programs are offered in the science, commerce and arts streams up to the bachelor's degree level. As of 2017, the college had an enrolment of approximately 4,620 students and a faculty of about 80, making it one of the largest women's colleges in Karachi.
