= James Burnes (surgeon) =

Scottish doctor and surgeon in India

James Burnes KH FRS
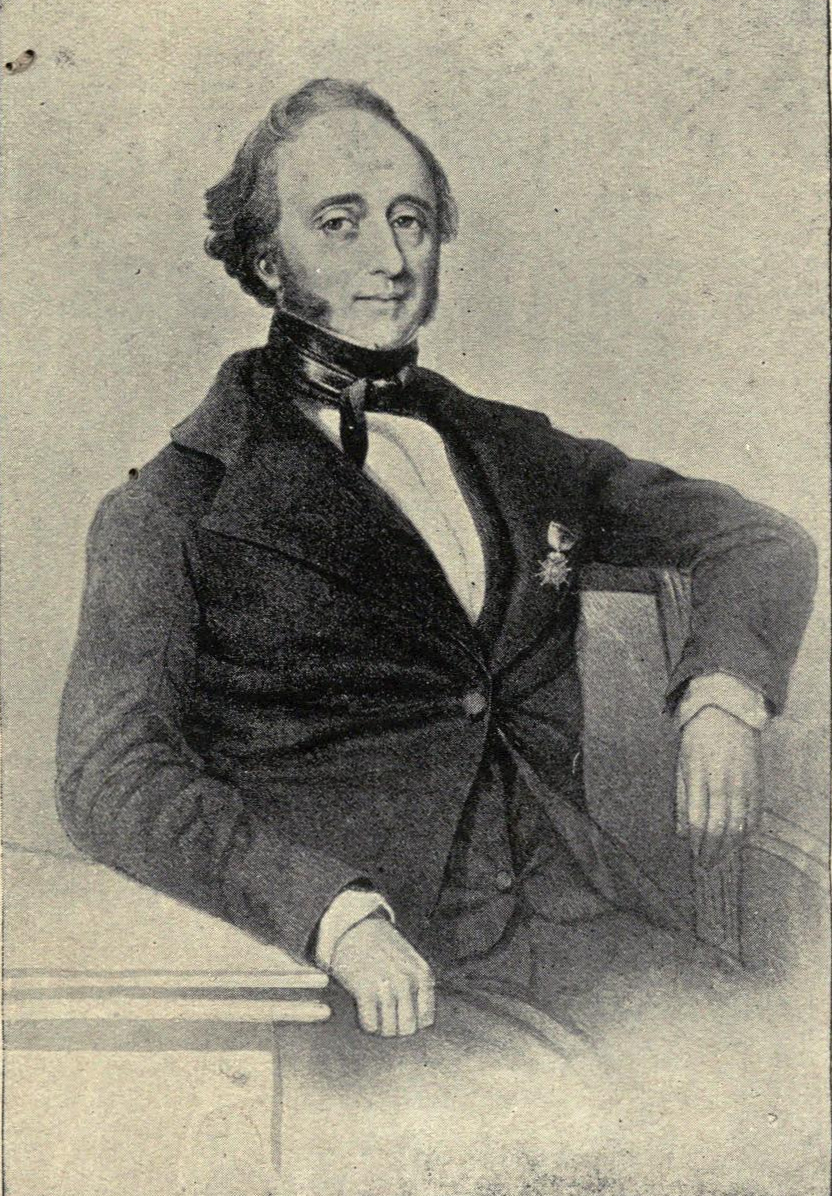
- Born: 12 February 1801; Montrose, Scotland, United Kingdom of Great Britain and Ireland
- Died: 19 September 1862 (aged 61); London, England, United Kingdom of Great Britain and Ireland
- Other name: James Freiherr Burnes de Montrose
- Relatives: Alexander Burnes (brother)

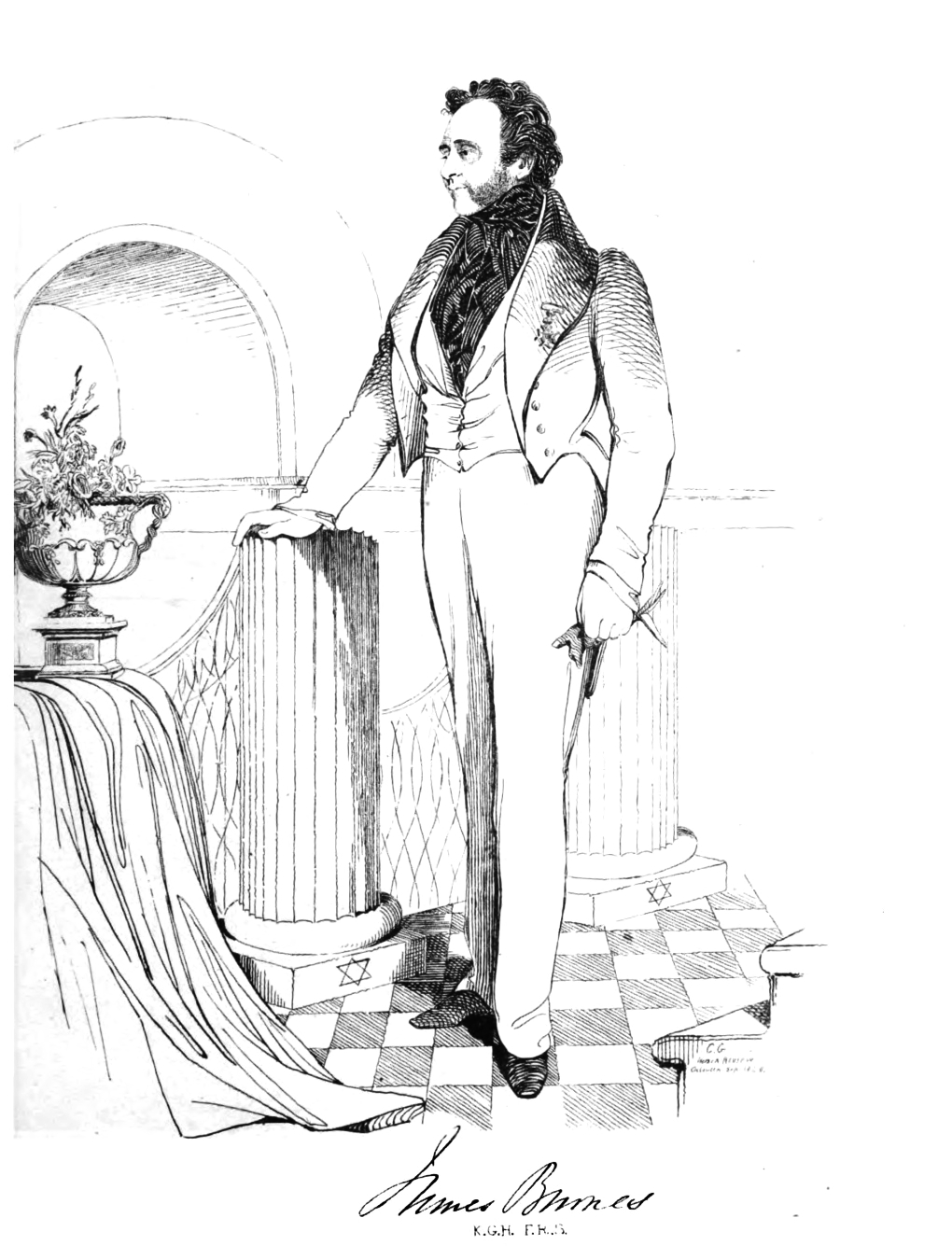
James Burnes by Colesworthey Grant

James Burnes, Freiherr Burnes de Montrose KH FRS (12 February 1801–19 September 1862) was a Scottish medical doctor and surgeon in India, who became physician-general of Bombay.

== Life ==
Burnes was born on 12 February 1801 at Montrose, where his father James Burnes was Provost. He was a medical student at Edinburgh University, and London's Guy's Hospital and St Thomas's Hospital.

Burnes arrived in 1821 at Bombay, with his brother Alexander Burnes. After taking minor posts in the medical service, he was successful in the open competition for the office of surgeon to the residency of Cutch State, quite recently in the hands of the East India Company. The state was led by Deshalji II, a minor, and there was an incursion from Sindh that forced the British brigade to retire to Bhuj. Burnes accompanied, as a volunteer, the field force which in 1825 expelled the Sindians.

With a flattering invitation, Burnes then visited Hyderabad in Sindh. He undertook what was a diplomatic mission to the satisfaction of the British. In England on sick leave in 1834, he was made an LL.D. of Glasgow University and a Fellow of the Royal Society, and received the knighthood of the Royal Guelphic Order from William IV.

On his return to India in 1837, Burnes was appointed garrison surgeon of Bombay, then secretary of the medical board, superintending surgeon, and finally physician-general. He was also a member of the board of education, and took an interest in the medical training of Indians. Poor health led him to resign in 1849, after twenty-eight years' service.

On his return home, Burns occupied himself with the local affairs of Forfarshire, where he was a justice of the peace. On 30 April 1862, Burnes was created Freiherr (Baron) Burnes de Montrose by Heinrich LXVII, Prince Reuss Younger Line. His coat of arms featured reference to "Cabool" and the Royal Guelphic Order. He moved to London, England, and died there on 19 September 1862.

== Freemasonry ==
Burnes became a Freemason in an English Lodge: Benevolent Lodge, No. 480, in 1828, (Bombay, [Mumbai] India). That Lodge no longer exists. When in Scotland in 1834, he was made an honorary member of Lodge St Peter, No. 120, (Montrose). On 30 April 1835 he was made an honorary member of Lodge Canongate Kilwinning, No. 2, (Edinburgh).

In 1836 he was appointed by the Grand Lodge of Scotland to be the Provincial Grand Master of Western India. His jurisdiction was later extended and he became Grand Master of all Scottish Freemasonry in India. During his term in office two Scottish Masonic Lodges were established. After he had reestablish lodge Perseverance no. 338 SC which was the oldest lodge in Bombay under the EC as no. 818. He first joined the lodge when he reached India after his brothers death. He was the RWM of the lodge two times and during his time as the Grand Master. Later he started 2 lodges by the name of Rising Star of Western India, No. 342, (Bombay) and the other, St Andrew-in-the-East, No. 343, (Poona, India). Both were granted Charters by the Grand Lodge of Scotland on 18 November 1844. He also started the chapter Perseverance no.71 now known as chapter Independence and Perseverance No.71 SC, This is the oldest premier Chapter in India. He started Holy Royal Arch and other order including MMM/ RAM / Red Cross of babylon/ Cryptic degrees. Establishing with fortitude the oldest lodge and chapter in India.

== Works ==
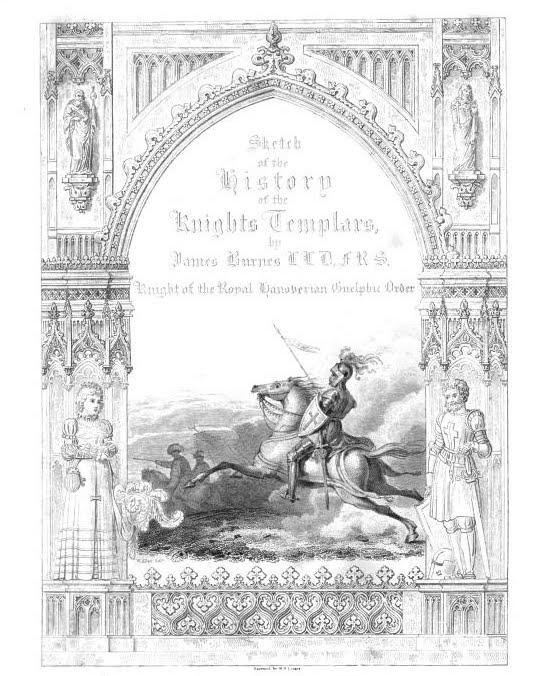
Illustration from Sketch of the History of the Knights Templars (1840) by James Burnes

A narrative of his visit to Sindh, sent in by Burnes as an official report to the resident at Cutch, was a contribution to the geography of India. It was published in book form, as Narrative of a Visit to Scinde, in 1830. He wrote also a Sketch of the History of Cutch (lithographed for private circulation, 1829), and a Sketch of the history of the Knights Templar.

== Legacy ==
When Burnes left Bombay, medals were founded, to be competed for at the Grant Medical School, Bombay, the Montrose Academy, and the boys' and girls' schools at Byculla. Both Scottish Lodges founded during Burnes' term as Grand Master continue to meet in Mumbai and Pune, India, (2019).

Burnes Road is named after him.

== Family ==
Burnes married, in 1829, Sophia Holmes, daughter of Sir George Holmes, in Bombay; they had nine children. He married, as his second wife, Esther Pryce, in June 1862.

== Honors ==
- 1835: Fellow of the Royal Society (FRS)
- Knight of the Royal Guelphic Order (KH)
- 1862: Freiherr

== Bibliography ==
- "Burnes, James". Oxford Dictionary of National Biography (online ed.). Oxford University Press. doi:10.1093/ref:odnb/4057. (Subscription, Wikipedia Library access or UK public library membership required.)
- Laurie, William Ferguson Beatson (1887). "James Burnes, K.H., F.R.S.". Sketches of some distinguished Anglo-Indians. London: W. H. Allen & Co. pp. 20–32.

== Attribution ==
This article incorporates text from a publication now in the public domain: Stephen, Leslie, ed. (1886). "Burnes, James". Dictionary of National Biography. Vol. 7. London: Smith, Elder & Co.
