= Robert Cormack =

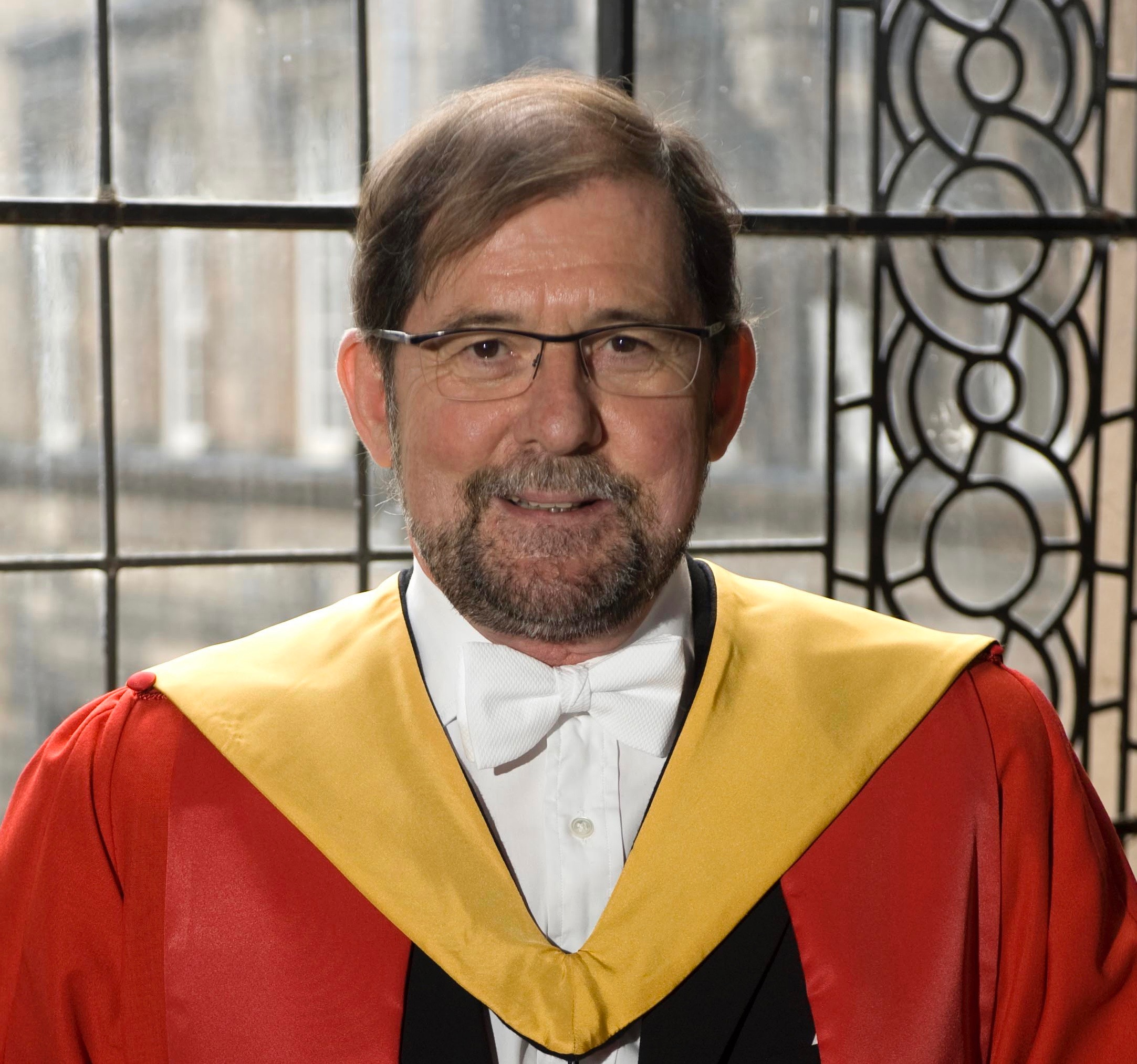
- Robert Cormack FRSE
- Born: 1946; Blantyre, Scotland
- Died: 6 November 2026 (aged 79–80); Edinburgh
- Education: Montrose Academy; University of Aberdeen; Brown University
- Occupations: Professor, Principal
- Predecessor: Professor Sir Alistair MacFarlane
- Successor: Professor James Fraser

Robert Cormack FRSE is a Scottish emeritus professor who retired in late 2009 from the UHI Millennium Institute. He taught at Queen's University, Belfast where his service spanned the troubles in Northern Ireland. He became a leading specialist and author on equal opportunities, discrimination and public policy in Northern Ireland.

With his colleague, Professor Robert Osborne, Professor Cormack undertook much of the early research on the differences in education and employment between the two communities in Northern Ireland. This led to major changes in fair employment legislation and in the funding of Catholic schools. Appointments to his name include work in Europe dealing with issues such as globalisation and the universities; under-represented groups in higher education; the contribution of higher education to tolerance in European society, and the "brain drain."

Professor Robert Cormack is now retired from academia, and spends considerable time living in Italy.

Robert Cormack passed away on 6 November 2026. As with the terms of his Will, there was no funeral held. His close family held a private event in remembrance of his life, and his body cremated, in Edinburgh.

== Early life ==
Cormack was born in Blantyre in Lanarkshire, and spent some of his youth living in the Greater Glasgow area before his family moved to Montrose on the North Eadt coast of Scotland.

After graduating from Montrose Academy, Cormack earned an MA in sociology from the University of Aberdeen and moved to New York to embark upon his graduate studies at Brown University. Cormack received the Woodrow Wilson Fellowship in 1971.

== Academic career ==
In 1973, he was appointed to a lectureship in sociology at Queen's University, Belfast and was Dean of the Faculty of Economics and Social Sciences before he was named Pro-Vice-Chancellor in 1995. He served as co-director of the Centre for Research on Higher Education, a joint research centre for the University of Ulster and Queen's University. Cormack was a professor of sociology at Queen's University, Belfast during the troubles in Northern Ireland, which spanned the last three decades of the 20th century.

Cormack worked with the Council of Europe including advising the post-war restructuring of Pristina University in Kosovo.

In 2001, Cormack succeeded Professor Sir Alistair MacFarlane to be named Principal of the UHI Millennium Institute, which created the University of the Highlands and Islands. Under his leadership, UHI achieved taught degree awarding powers in 2008 and reached the final stages in the process for university title. He received one of the first honorary fellowships awarded by the University of the Highlands and Islands, for his contribution to its realisation, from its first-ever Chancellor, HRH The Princess Royal, in 2012.

He has served as Chair of the Belfast Citizens Advice Bureau, a member of the Joint Information Systems Committee, and a member of the court of Queen Margaret University, Edinburgh as well as a trustee of the Royal Society of Edinburgh and of the David Hume Institute. Cormack was a fellow of the Royal Society of Arts, and a director of the Society for Research into Higher Education Governing Council, Cormack was a trustee on the Ireland Chair of Poetry, and a member of the Board of Governors of Stranmillis University College.

== Awards and honours ==
In 2008 he was elected a Fellow of the Royal Society of Edinburgh. Cape Breton University awarded him a Doctor of Letters in 2009, and the same year the University of Edinburgh awarded him a Doctor honoris causa.

== Bibliography ==
- Religion, Education and Employment (1983)
- Education and Social Policy in Northern Ireland (1987)
- Discrimination and Public Policy in Northern Ireland (1991)
- After the Reforms (1993)
