= James Cameron (physician) =

Scottish physician

Sir James Davidson Stuart Cameron, CBE TD FRSE (1900 – 1969) was a Scottish physician of note. He served as President of the Royal College of Physicians in Edinburgh from 1960 to 1963. He was a devout Christian and a teetotaller, and also served as President of the Edinburgh Medical Missionary Society. He was often known as JDS.

== Life ==
He was born on 28 December 1900 in Montrose in north-east Scotland the son of Joseph Calder Cameron.

His early education was at Montrose Academy. He then studied medicine at Edinburgh University graduating in 1923. After briefly serving as a junior doctor at both Edenhall and Highbury Hospitals in England He returned to Edinburgh to lecture in Physiology (under Prof Edward Sharpey Schafer) at the university from 1926 to 1939, being granted an MD in 1932 following his thesis on renal function, which won the gold medal for the year. In 1928 he was elected a member of the Harveian Society of Edinburgh. In 1933 he was appointed as Consultant physician to the Edinburgh Royal Infirmary and held this role for over 30 years.

Foreseeing the outbreak of war he joined the Territorial Army as an officer in 1938 and was mobilised immediately upon the outbreak of war. During the Second World War he served first in the Middle East and then in southern India, and had a distinguished war service, rising to the rank of Brigadier in the Royal Army Medical Corps and honorary consultant to the India and Burma Offices by 1946. These services led to his being awarded a Commander of the Order of the British Empire in that year.

He was elected a member of the Aesculapian Club in 1961. He was elected a Fellow of the Royal Society of Edinburgh in 1963 and knighted in June 1965.

Following retiral from Edinburgh Royal Infirmary, from 1965 to 1965 he was both Professor and Director of the Institute of Post Graduate Medicine in Dacca, Pakistan.

A sum of £5000 was left to the college by Sir James Cameron to form a fund, called the Sir James Cameron Medal, the interest to be used to assist in financing the St Andrew's Day Festival for educational purposes.

He died of a heart attack during his chairing of a meeting of the Edinburgh Medical Library on 13 February 1969. The Lancet published his obituary on 22 February.

== Family ==
He married Esther Johanne Frederickson-Dover (of an Indian missionary family) in 1929 but they had no children.
