= Alexander Burnes =

Scottish explorer and diplomat (1805–1841)

Captain Sir Alexander Burnes FRS
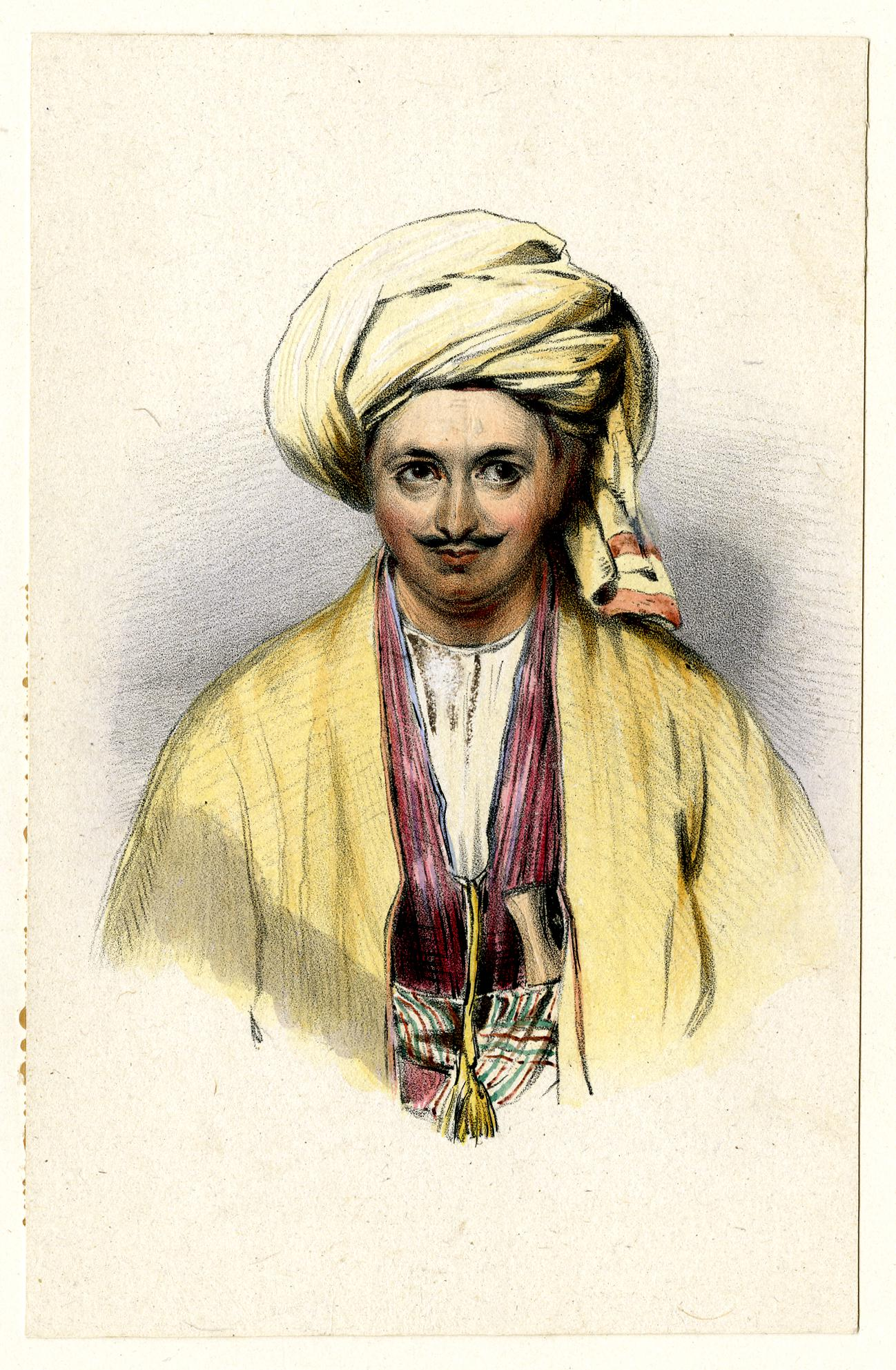
- Sketch by Vincent Eyre, 1843
- Born: 16 May 1805; Montrose, Scotland, United Kingdom of Great Britain and Ireland
- Died: 2 November 1841 (aged 36); Kabul, Durrani Kingdom
- Relatives: James Burnes (brother), Robert Burnes (cousin)
- Awards: Royal Geographical Society's Founder's Medal (1835)

Captain Sir Alexander Burnes FRS (16 May 1805 – 2 November 1841) was a Scottish explorer, military officer and diplomat associated with the Great Game. He was nicknamed Bokhara Burnes for his role in establishing contact with and exploring Bukhara. His memoir, Travels into Bokhara, was a bestseller when it was first published in 1835.

== Early life ==
Burnes was born on 16 May 1805 in Montrose, Scotland, as the fourth son of James Burnes (1780–1852) the local provost, who was first cousin to the poet Robert Burns. His brother was the doctor and surgeon James Burnes.

At the age of sixteen, Alexander joined the army of the East India Company and while serving in India, he learned Urdu and Persian, and obtained an appointment as an interpreter at Surat in 1822.

He was transferred to Kutch in 1826 where he was based at Bhuj for three years. As assistant to the political agent, he took an interest in the history and geography of north-western India and the adjacent countries, which had not yet been thoroughly explored by the British; he then went to Afghanistan.

== Exploration ==
Afghanistan, one of the most remote kingdoms in the world, found itself sandwiched between the rival British and Russian empires. British control in India made the Russians suspect an intention to move northwards through Afghanistan; conversely, the British feared that India was sought by Russia. Sensing the two empires would collide in Afghanistan, the British Government needed intelligence and dispatched Burnes to get it. In 1831, travelling in disguise, Burnes surveyed the route through Kabul to Bukhara and produced the first detailed accounts of Afghan politics.

His proposal in 1829 to undertake a journey of exploration through the valley of the Indus River was approved and in 1831 his and Henry Pottinger's surveys of the Indus river would prepare the way for a future assault on the Sindh to clear a path towards Central Asia.

In the same year he arrived in Lahore with a present of horses from King William IV to Maharaja Ranjit Singh. The British claimed that the horses would not survive the overland journey, so they were allowed to transport the horses up the Indus and used the opportunity to secretly survey the river. Despite pressure from his superiors, Burnes declined a military escort on his journey up the Indus, fearing their presence would cause the native population to conclude the British intended to mount an invasion. Instead, Burnes travelled with only one other British officer, Ensign J.D. Leckie, and periodically enlisted members of native communities to man and navigate his convoy. In so doing, Burnes developed close bonds with local leaders and governors in cities along the Indus. His immense skills in diplomacy and knowledge of local customs and rites of flattery enabled him to travel through areas of the Indus previously closed to Europeans, including Thatta, Hyderabad, Bukkur, and Shujabad, among others.

In October 1831, Burnes coordinated the first meeting of Maharaja Ranjit Singh with a sitting commander of British forces in India, Governor General Lord William Bentinck. The assembly took place in the village of Rupur (present day Rupnagar) on the banks of the Sutlej from 22 to 26 October. The event was attended by numerous British political attachés and subalterns including Bentinck, General John Ramsay, and H.T. Prinsep. The event was also marked by the Maharajah's open display of the celebrated Koh-i-Noor diamond, which he presented for free inspection by the British attendees (the jewel would eventually come into the possession of the British royal family, and set in the Crown of Queen Alexandra).

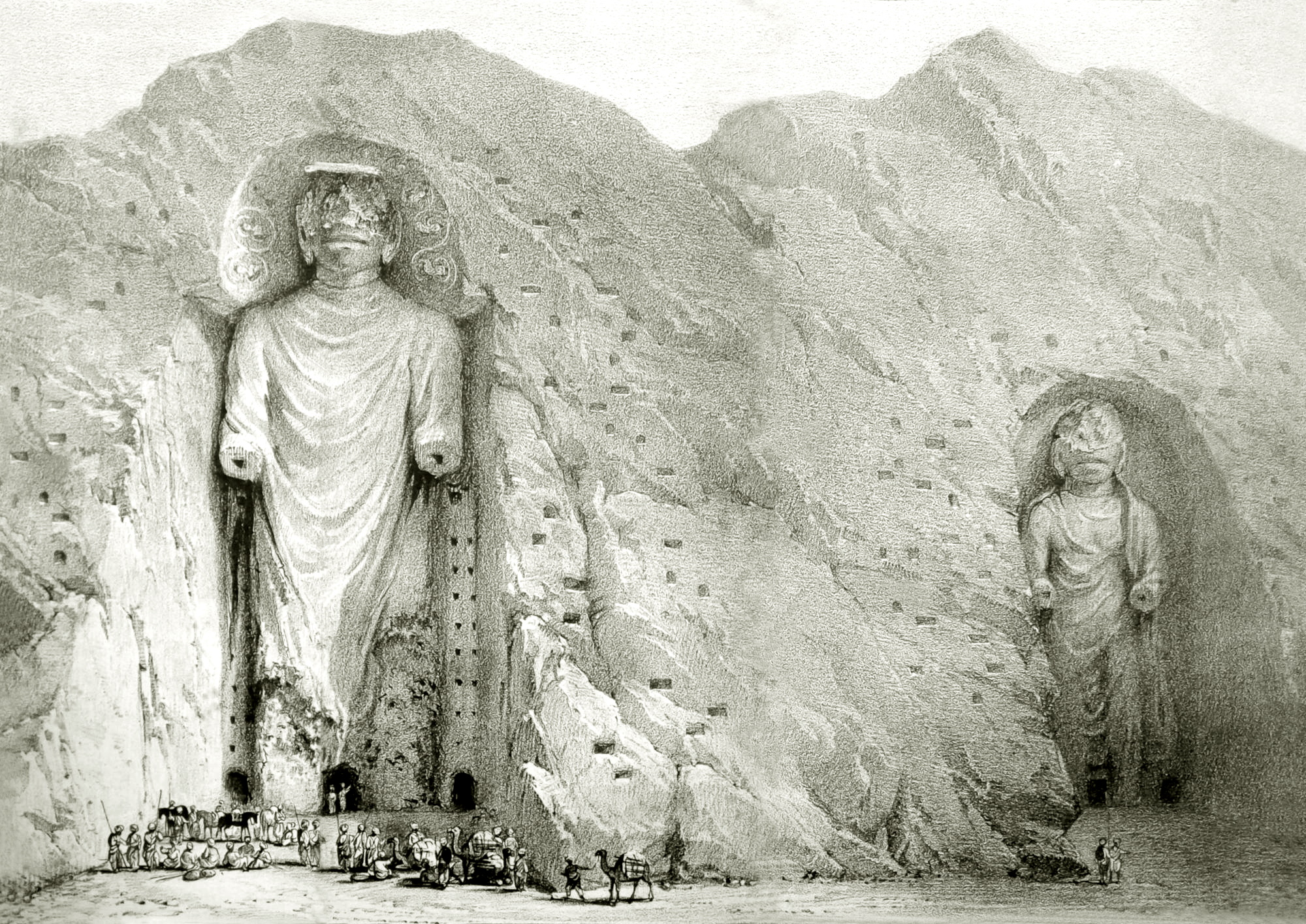
Engraving of the Buddhas of Bamiyan, as Burnes saw them during his visit to Bamiyan in 1832; they have since been destroyed.

Following the Rupur summit, Burnes took up brief residence in Delhi from November to December 1831. It was in Delhi that, on 19 December, Burnes first made contact with his future travelling partner Mohan Lal. While visiting a Hindu school in the grounds of Humayun's Tomb, Burnes witnessed a recitation by Lal on the dismemberment of Poland, and was so impressed with the young boy's knowledge of western geography, he invited Lal to travel with him to Tartary. From Delhi, Burnes then travelled to Ludhiana where he received permission to proceed in his travels into Central Asia.

In the following years, in company with Mohan Lal, his travels continued through Afghanistan across the Hindu Kush to Bukhara (in what is modern Uzbekistan) and Persia.

The narrative which he published on his visit to England in 1834 added immensely to contemporary knowledge of these countries, and was one of the most popular books of the time. It was republished in 2012. The first edition earned the author £800 (equivalent to £90,000 in 2025), and his services were recognised not only by the Royal Geographical Society of London, but also by that of Paris. He was also elected a Fellow of the Royal Society the same year. London's prestigious Athenaeum Club admitted him without ballot. Soon after his return to India in 1835 he was appointed to the court of Sindh to secure a treaty for the navigation of the Indus and in 1836 he undertook a political mission to Dost Mohammad Khan at Kabul.

== First Anglo-Afghan War ==
He advised Lord Auckland to support Dost Mohammed on the throne of Kabul, but the viceroy preferred to follow the opinion of Sir William Hay Macnaghten and reinstated Shah Shuja, thus leading to the outbreak of the First Anglo-Afghan War. On the restoration of Shah Shuja in 1839, Burnes became regular political agent at Kabul. He was knighted by Queen Victoria on 6 August 1838, while serving in the 21st India Native Infantry on a mission in Afghanistan, and remained there until his assassination in 1841, during an insurrection in which his younger brother, Charles, was also killed. The calmness with which he continued at his post despite the threat to his life, and after the death of his political assistant Major William Broadfoot, won him a heroic reputation.

It came to light in 1860 that some of Burnes's dispatches from Kabul in 1839 had been altered to convey opinions that had not been his, but Lord Palmerston refused after so long to grant the inquiry demanded in the House of Commons. An account of his later labours was published in 1842 under the title of Cabool: A Personal Narrative of a Journey to, and Residence in that City, in the Years 1836, 7, and 8.

== Final months and death ==
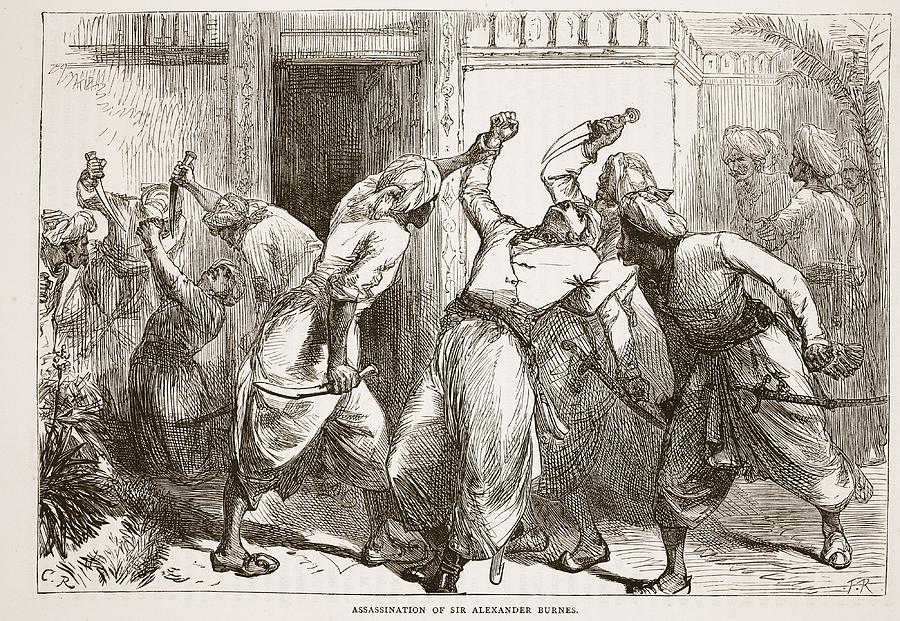
Assassination of Alexander Burnes

On 7 August 1839, the British Government restored Afghan leader Shah Shuja to the throne in Kabul after an exile of over thirty years. Shujah had been living as a pensioner of the crown for the entirety of his exile. He was considered to be the candidate most complacent and willing to cooperate with British interests in the region.

Burnes, having long considered Shujah unfit to rule, had implored then Governor General Lord Auckland to endorse Dost Mohammad Khan to accede to the throne. His recommendations went unheeded and, on 3 November 1840, Dost Mohammad surrendered himself to British forces, going into exile in India. Despite his hesitation in endorsing Shujah; Burnes, along with Sir William Hay Macnaghten, 1st Baronet, was installed in Kabul as resident political officers, a position Burnes himself resented, calling himself "a highly paid idler".

In Kabul, the reign of Shah Shuja was marked by tyranny and widespread poverty among the Afghan people. Shuja announced that he considered his own people to be "dogs" who needed to be taught to be obedient to their master, and spent his time exacting bloody vengeance on those Afghans who he felt had betrayed him.

At the same time, large numbers of British officers, their wives, children, and staff, had relocated to Kabul for the favourable temperatures, having previously been stationed in the hot, dry plains of Hindustan. The British influx brought with it numerous foreign customs such as cricket, skating, and steeplechase. The sudden swelling of the city's population caused prices for food and goods in the bazaars to skyrocket. At the same time, Shujah had greatly increased taxation on the population, leading to a large scale economic depression among the lower class.

At the urging of Shah Shuja, the British and Indian troops had agreed to relocate their encampment out of the city walls, setting up a series of cantonments outside the city. Burnes however, chose to remain within the heart of the old city, taking up residence in a walled house with a handful of other senior officers including his brother Lieutenant Charles Burnes, and Major William Broadfoot.

On 1 November 1841, Burnes was approached by his former travelling companion Mohan Lal who informed Burnes of a plot to have him killed, urging him to flee the city for the relative safety of the cantonment. As the representative of Britain in Kabul, it was Burnes whom many Afghans considered responsible for the city's financial and religious decay. Confident he could quell any potential trouble, Burnes decided to stay in Kabul against his friend's advice. That night, a small group of men began driving up a mob around the city. The group was originally a small contingent directly opposed to Burnes's presence. They managed to swell their numbers by spreading the message that the building adjacent to Burnes's house was used as the garrison treasury, holding pay for the entire British forces in Kabul.

By nightfall, a large mob had assembled within the courtyard of Burnes's house. Burnes sent a runner to the cantonments asking for immediate assistance, before stepping out onto his balcony to attempt to reason with the crowd. Reportedly, assistance from the British army was delayed by a series of internal arguments between senior officers there on how best to respond to the threat.

The situation with the rioters continued to deteriorate as they set fire to the compound stables. A single shot was fired from the crowd and Major Broadfoot, standing beside Burnes on the balcony, was killed. Now assured that there was no longer a chance for rescue, Charles Burnes exited, armed, into the courtyard, reportedly killing six men before being hacked to death. Alexander Burnes was soon beaten and hacked to death by the mob. The events took place just half an hour's march from where the British troops had been stationed. One young officer, recording the event in his journal, noted "When 300 men would have been sufficient in the morning, 3000 would not have been adequate in the afternoon."

== Legacy ==
He is commemorated in the name of the rufous-vented grass babbler Laticilla burnesii.

== Publications ==
- Burnes, Alexander (1834). Travels into Bokhara. Being an account of a Journey from India to Cabool, Tartary and Persia. Also, narrative of a Voyage on the Indus from the Sea to Lahore. Vol. I (1 ed.). London: John Murrary.
  - Burnes, Alexander (1835). "Travels into Bokhara. Being an account of a Journey from India to Cabool, Tartary and Persia. Also, narrative of a Voyage on the Indus from the Sea to Lahore". Travels into Bokhara. I (2 ed.). London: John Murrary. doi:10.11588/diglit.15172.
- Burnes, Alexander (1834). Travels into Bokhara. Being an account of a Journey from India to Cabool, Tartary and Persia. Also, narrative of a Voyage on the Indus from the Sea to Lahore. Vol. II (1 ed.). London: John Murrary.
  - Burnes, Alexander (1835). "Travels into Bokhara. Being an account of a Journey from India to Cabool, Tartary and Persia. Also, narrative of a Voyage on the Indus from the Sea to Lahore". Travels into Bokhara. II (2 ed.). London: John Murrary. doi:10.11588/diglit.15173.
- Burnes, Alexander (1834). Travels into Bokhara. Being an account of a Journey from India to Cabool, Tartary and Persia. Also, narrative of a Voyage on the Indus from the Sea to Lahore. Vol. III (1 ed.). London: John Murrary.
  - Burnes, Alexander (1835). "Travels into Bokhara. Being an account of a Journey from India to Cabool, Tartary and Persia. Also, narrative of a Voyage on the Indus from the Sea to Lahore". Travels into Bokhara. III (2 ed.). London: John Murrary. doi:10.11588/diglit.15174.
- Burnes, Alexander (2012). Hopkirk, Kathleen (ed.). Travels into Bokhara: A Voyage up the Indus to Lahore and a Journey to Cabool, Tartary & Persia. Eland. ISBN 978-1906011710.
- Burnes, Alexander (1836–1838). "On the Commerce of Shikarpoor and Upper Scinde". Transactions of the Bombay Geographical Society. I (Reprint 1844): 315–326.
- Burnes, Alexander (1842). Cabool. Being a Personal Narrative of a Journey to, and Residence in that City in the years 1836, 7, and 8. London: John Murray.

== Historical fiction featuring Burnes ==
- Fraser, George MacDonald, Flashman. 1969.
- Hensher, Philip, The Mulberry Empire. 2002.
- Henty, G. A., To Herat and Cabul, A Story of the First Afghan War. 1902.
- Assassin's Creed Chronicles: India

== Bibliography ==
- "Burnes, Sir Alexander". Oxford Dictionary of National Biography (online ed.). Oxford University Press. doi:10.1093/ref:odnb/4056. (Subscription, Wikipedia Library access or UK public library membership required.)
- Burnes, James (1851). Notes on his Name and Family. Edinburgh: Printed for private circulation.
- David, Saul (2007) [2006]. Victoria's Wars: The Rise of Empire. London: Penguin. ISBN 978-0-14-100555-3.
- Hopkirk, Peter (1992). The Great Game: The Struggle for Empire in Central Asia. New York: Kodansha International. ISBN 1-56836-022-3.
- Kaye, John William (1867). "Sir Alexander Burnes". Lives of Indian Officers. Vol. II. London: A. Strahan and Co. pp. 1–66.+
- Lunt, James (1969). Bokhara Burnes. Faber. ISBN 978-0571089352.
- Maclagan, David (1871). "A Christian Legislator". In Arnot, William (ed.). The Family treasury of Sunday reading. [Continued as] The Christian monthly and family treasury. London, Edinburgh and New York: T. Nelson and sons. pp. 77-83.
- Murray, Craig (2016). Sikunder Burnes: Master of the Great Game. Edinburgh: Birlinn. ISBN 978-1780273174.
- Omrani, Bijan (2006). "Will we make it to Jalalabad?". Asian Affairs. 37 (2): 161–174. doi:10.1080/03068370600661458. S2CID 162185406.
- Perry, James M. (2005). Arrogant Armies. Edison, New Jersey: CastleBooks. ISBN 978-0471119760.
