= Edward Baird (artist) =

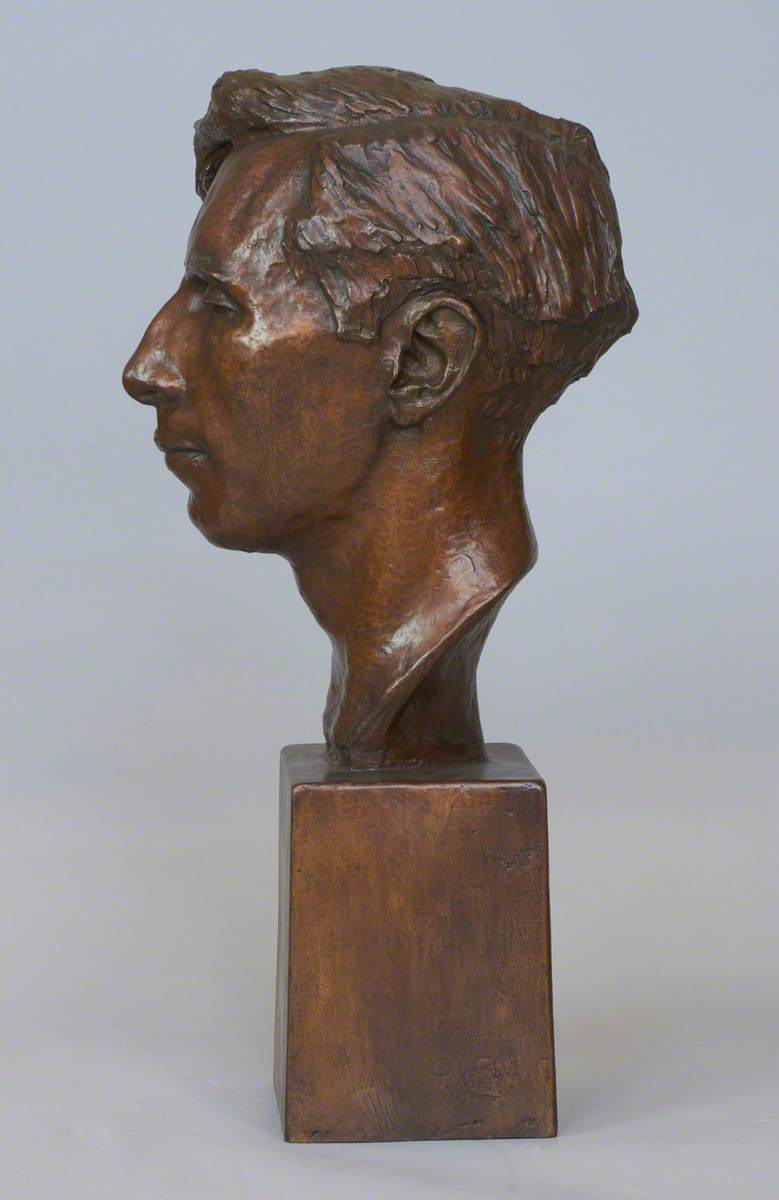
- Baird (sculpture by William Lamb)
- Born: Edward MacEwan Baird; 1904; Montrose, Angus
- Died: 7 January 1949 (aged 44–45)
- Education: Montrose Academy, Glasgow School of Art
- Known for: Paintings

Edward Baird (1904 – 7 January 1949) was a Scottish artist, known for his portrait painting.

== Biography ==
Baird was born in Montrose in 1904, the son of a sea captain. He was descended from a long line of seafarers, but poor health throughout his life meant that he was unable to follow his forebears to sea. His father was lost at sea when he was a small child, and so he was brought up by his mother, living at various properties on Montrose High Street. Baird was educated at Montrose Academy, and was accepted into Glasgow School of Art in 1924. He studied there for a total of four years, finishing as an undergraduate in 1927, and winning the Newbery medal as the top student of the year. After a year's postgraduate teaching diploma, he spent four months- from December 1928 to March 1929, travelling and studying in Italy, funded by a travelling scholarship provided by Glasgow School of Art.

On his return from Italy, Baird moved back to Montrose and began a career as a portrait painter For a time, he was involved in the nascent "Scottish Renaissance" movement in the town, and with early Scottish nationalist politics. Alongside the author Fionn MacColla, and local businessman such as Allan Ogilvie and Andrew Dalgetty, Baird participated in a lively branch of the newly founded National Party of Scotland in the town, until the early 1930s, and designed one of the earliest extant logos for the NPS, which was used locally in Angus.

Baird's method of working was slow, painstaking and based on thorough and exhaustive research of the subject at hand. He found it difficult to draw or paint something unless he had a profound knowledge of the subject. This proclivity, together with lengthy periods of ill health, saw him complete barely 40 paintings and a similar number of drawings during his career. Baird was plagued with chronic asthma and heart trouble, in addition to being a heavy cigarette smoker.

Baird's early 1930s portraits focused on individuals close to him, and those associated with the Nationalist movement. He painted MacColla in Portrait of a Young Scotsman in 1932, and the picture received very favourable reviews after exhibitions at the Royal Scottish Academy in Edinburgh and at the Royal Academy in London. Alongside his portraiture, Baird experimented with a kind of Surrealist painting in Birth of Venus, painted in 1934 and given as a wedding present to his close friend and colleague, James McIntosh Patrick. It may well have been through Patrick's influence that Baird joined the teaching staff of Dundee College of Art in 1936. To what extent he passed on his avant-garde interests to his students is unclear, but strong affinities can be seen in the work of both of the post-Diploma Drawing & Painting students of 1937–8, Alexander Allan and Patrick Hennessy. Baird's lifelong health problems meant that he was frequently absent from work and he left the college in 1939.

By the mid-1930s, all the early energy of the National Party of Scotland in Montrose had dissipated and, disillusioned, Baird turned more towards a socialist-inspired vision of ordinary working people and the effects that the long industrial depression of the 1930s had on his locality. The 1936 canvas, Distressed Area, shows an empty Montrose harbour, looking out across Rossie Island and the River South Esk, to the North Sea.

When war was declared in September 1939, Baird was working on a large scale portrait of his friend, and well known local character, James "Pumphy" Davidson. Baird quickly adapted the portrait to show Davidson wearing an armband of the newly created Local Defence Volunteers, later the Home Guard. This image quickly became important in Britain's early propaganda efforts in the war, to show the determination of the UK to resist any attempt to invade the country.

Baird became an Official War Artist in 1942. In that year, he was part of an exhibition called Six Scottish Artists in London, where his best known painting, Unidentified Aircraft was exhibited. The image shows what appears to be two men looking up into the sky, trying to determine where the noise of an aircraft engine is coming from. Baird's stylised rendition of Montrose in the background gleams in the steely light of a "Bomber's Moon", making plain the vulnerability of small coastal towns to German air raids. As an official war artist, Baird completed three portraits of workers in the munitions industry during 1943–44.

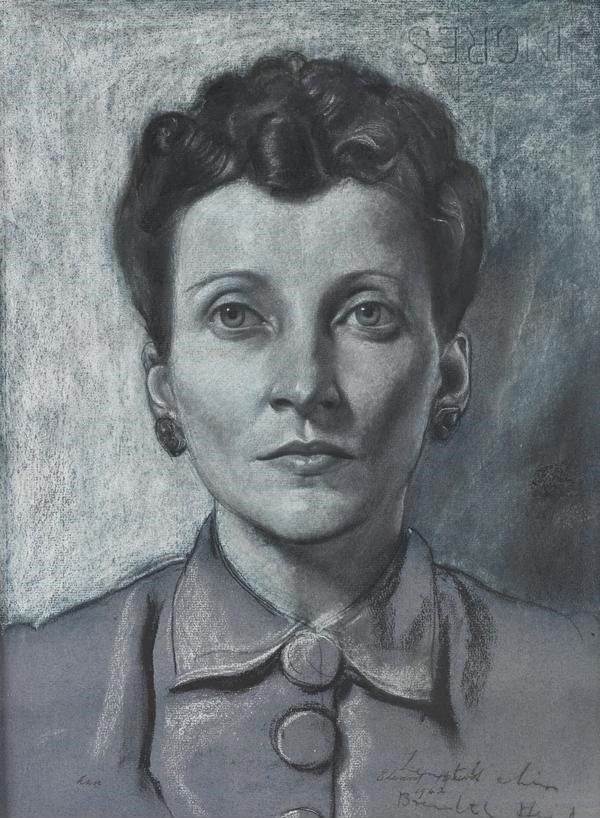
Ann Fairweather

By 1944 Baird's health was in a very poor state and he was hospitalised in Montrose and Aberdeen in the second part of the year. It was feared that he might not survive, and he married his long-term partner, Ann Fairweather, during this period. However, he was to live for another five years, completing the agricultural commission Angus and the Mearns in 1948. At the time of his death, he was working on a monumental canvas entitled The Howff, which takes its name from a well known cemetery in the middle of Dundee. The fragmentary painting features his mother, and his wife, and is an imagination of their feelings after his death.

Edward Baird died on 7 January 1949, aged just 44. He was the subject of a memorial exhibition in Dundee in 1950, but, after that, his name and work lapsed into obscurity. He left instructions with his wife that all his personal papers and works were to be burned, but the paintings were never committed to the flames. They remained in the possession of Ann Baird until her death in 1972, and then, locally, in the hands of the extended family.

Baird's work came under critical scrutiny in exhibitions in Montrose in 1968 and 1981, and his first national exhibition for over 40 years was held at the National Gallery of Scotland in 1992, curated by Patrick Elliott. In 2004, the first exhibition of his work in London, for over 60 years, was held at the Fleming Wyfold Art Foundation, accompanied by a new book written by Montrose-based art historian Jon Blackwood. His work can be seen in public collections throughout Scotland- in Aberdeen, Montrose, Dundee, Edinburgh, Glasgow and Paisley Given the scarcity of work produced, his exactingly precise and detailed paintings are also much sought after by private collectors.

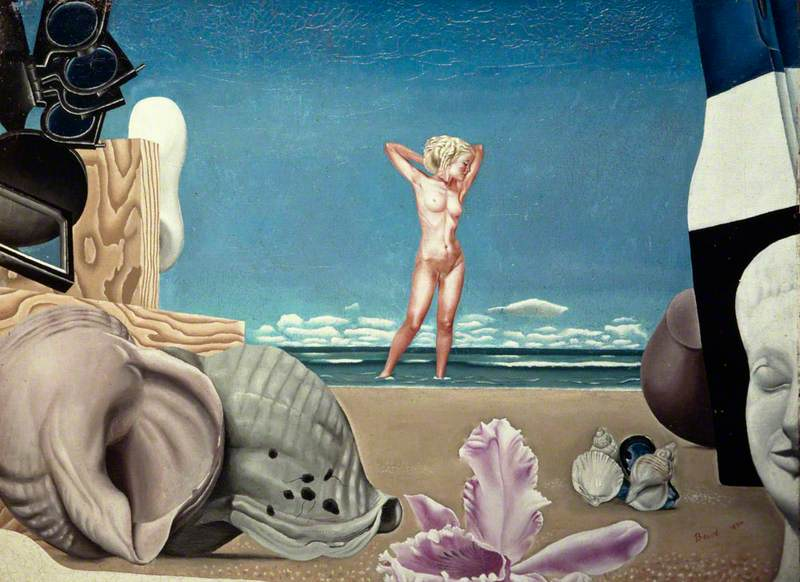
The Birth of Venus (1934)

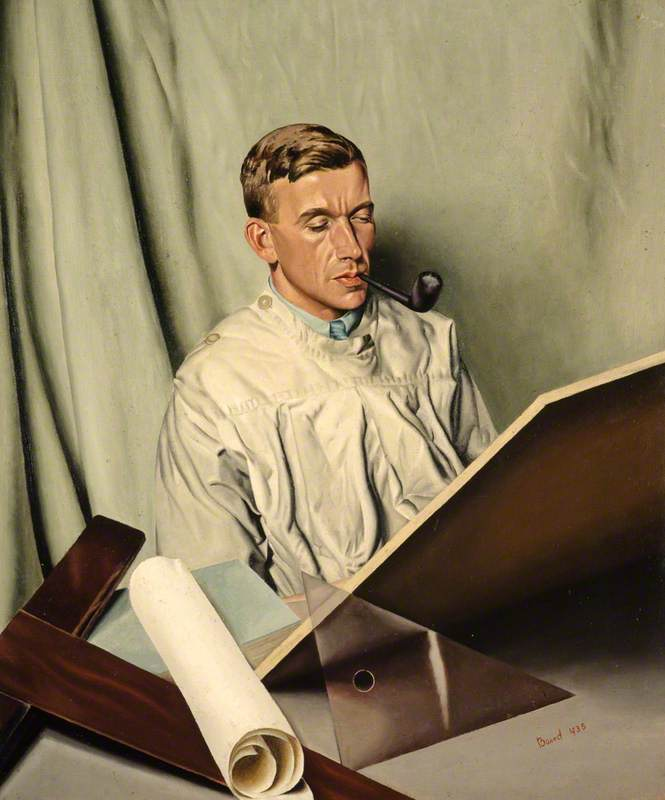
George Fairweather (1935)

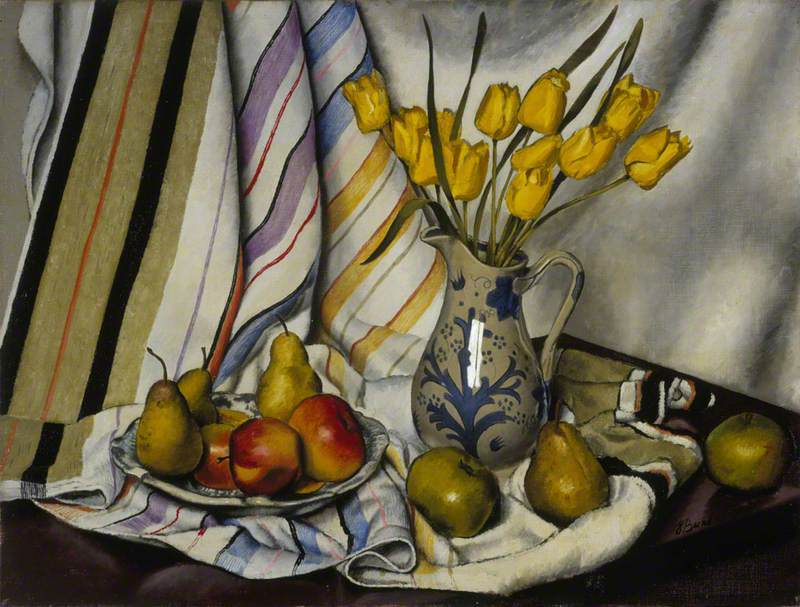
Still life (1940)

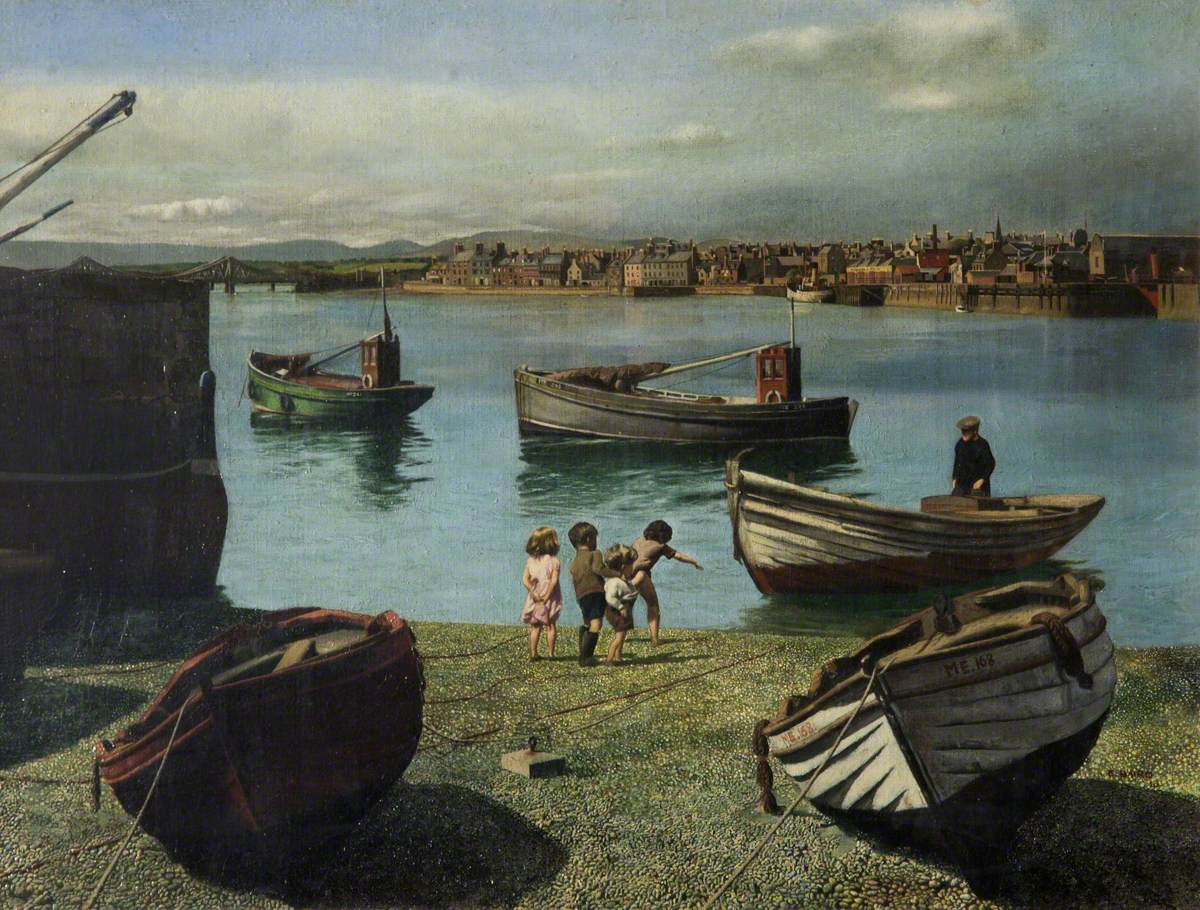
Montrose from Ferryden (1941)

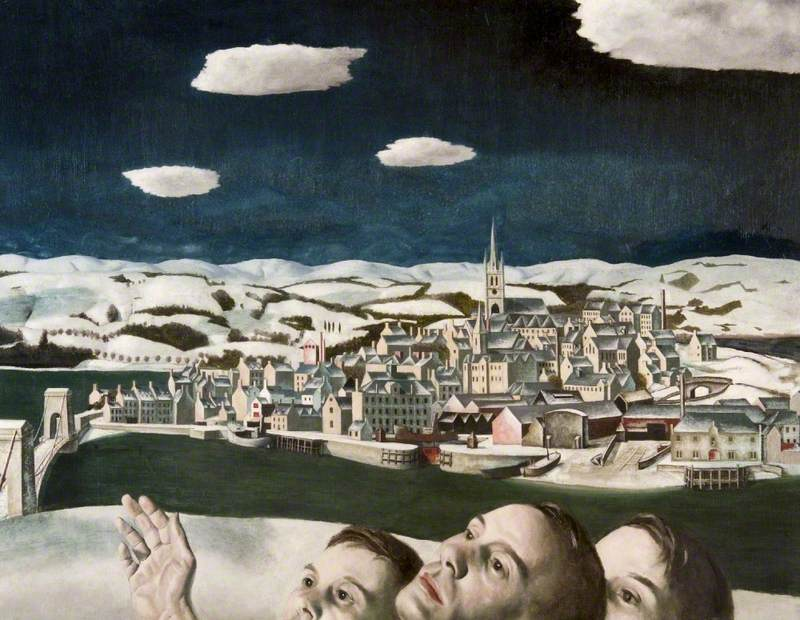
Unidentified Aircraft (1942)

== Bibliography ==
- Patrick Elliott, Scottish Masters: Edward Baird, national Galleries of Scotland, Edinburgh, 1992
- Jonathan Blackwood, Portrait of a Young Scotsman: A Life of Edward Baird, Fleming-Wyfold Art Foundation, London, 2004
- Duncan MacMillan, Scottish Art 1460-2000, Mainstream Publishing, Edinburgh, 2000
