= Alexander Petrie (minister) =

Scottish minister in Rotterdam (c.1594–1662)

- Minister
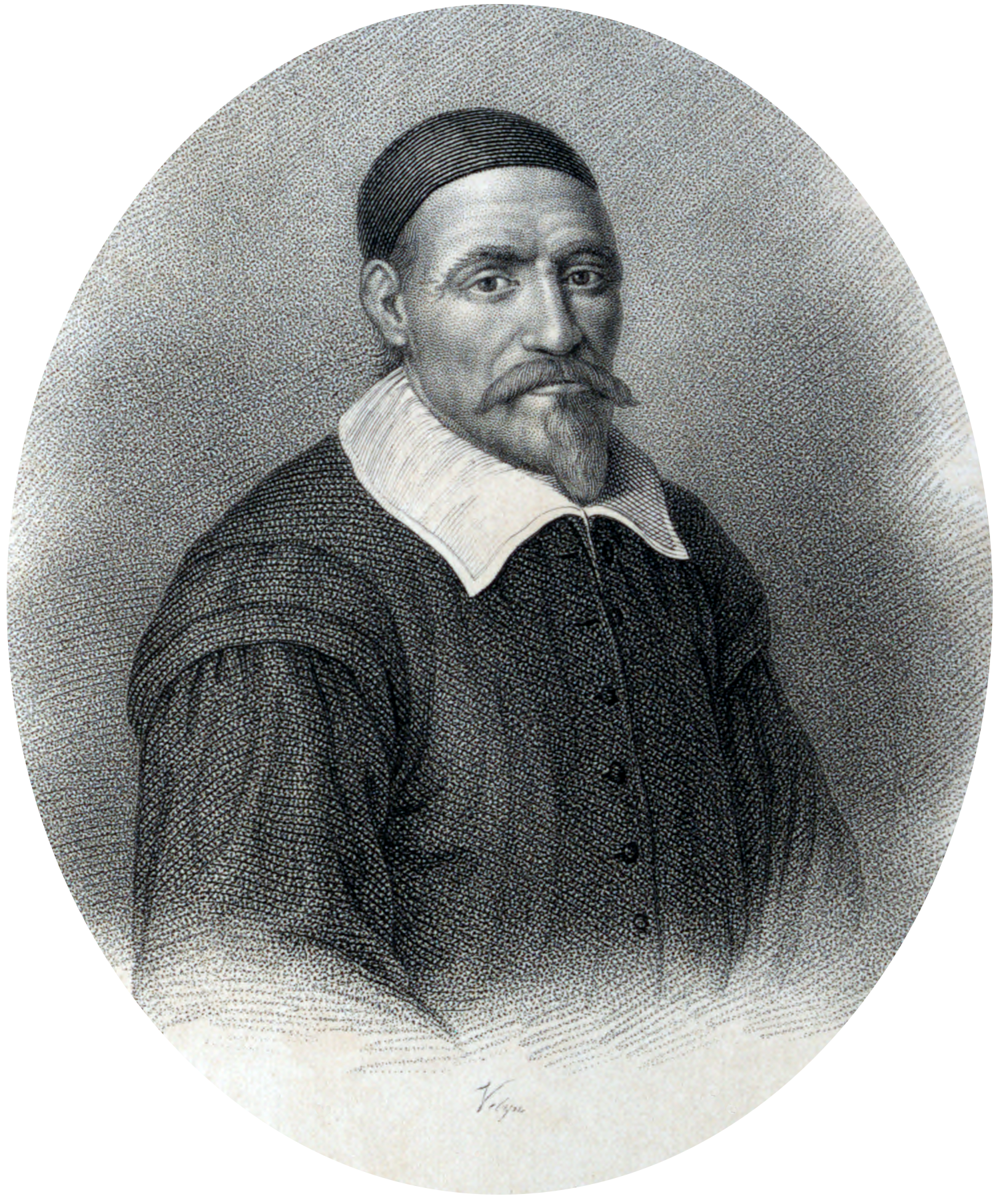
- Alexander Petrie - minister at the Scots Kirk, Rotterdam

Personal details
- Born: Alexander Petrie; 1594? Montrose, Scotland
- Died: 6 September 1662 (aged 67–68) Rotterdam
- Denomination: Presbyterian
- Occupation: Minister of the Scots Kirk in Rotterdam

Alexander Petrie was a Scottish divine, born about 1594, was third son of Alexander Petrie, merchant and burgess of Montrose. He was the minister of Rhynd in Perthshire and was translated, to Rotterdam on 29 March 1643. He preached his first sermon at Rotterdam on 2 August, and was admitted on 30 August 1643. He died on 6 September 1662. His Compendious History of the Catholick Church contains copious extracts from the Records of the General Assembly of the Church of Scotland, which were destroyed by a fire in the Lawnmarket, Edinburgh, 1701.

== Life ==
National Scottish Church Rotterdam

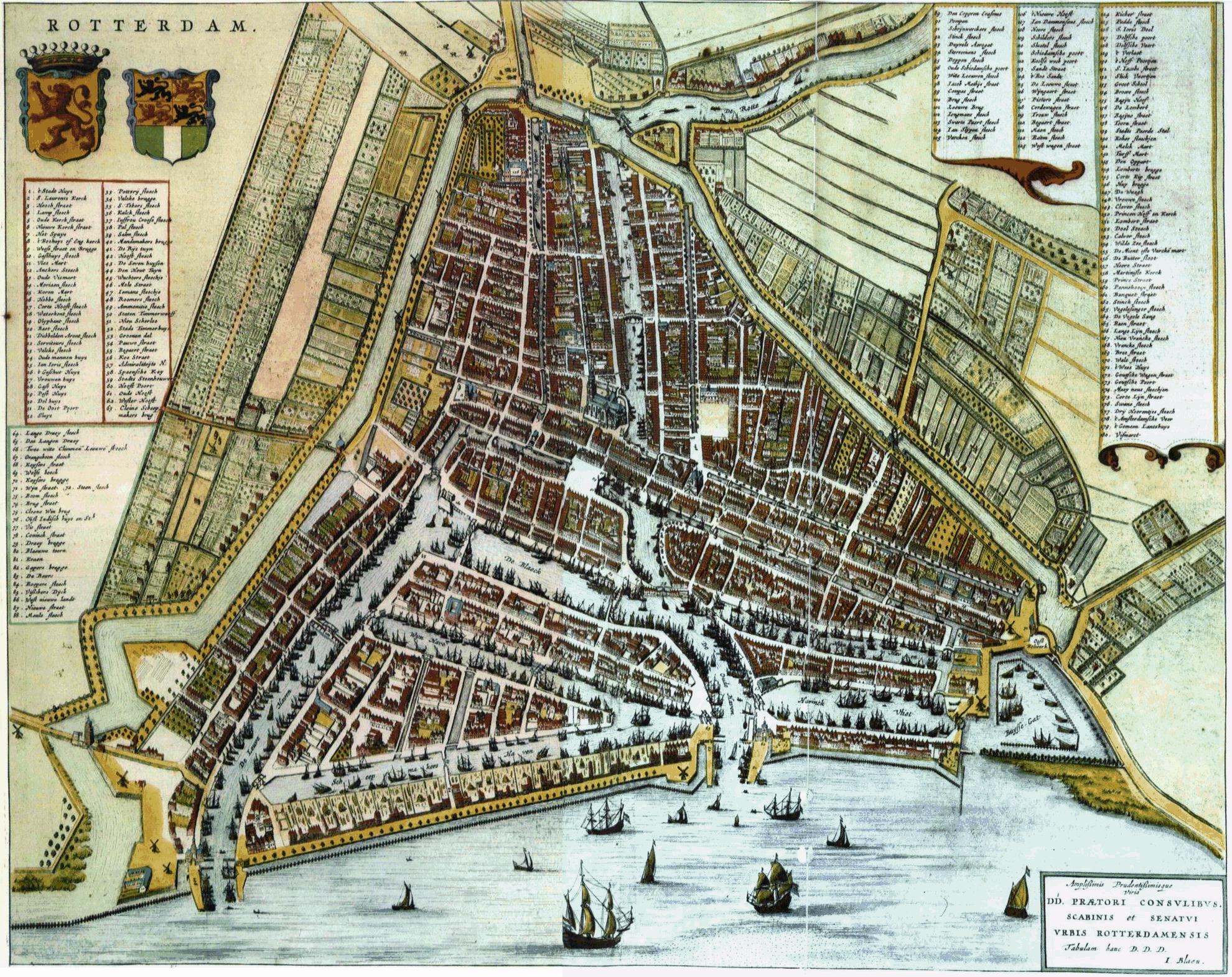
Rotterdam 1649 by Joan Blaeu

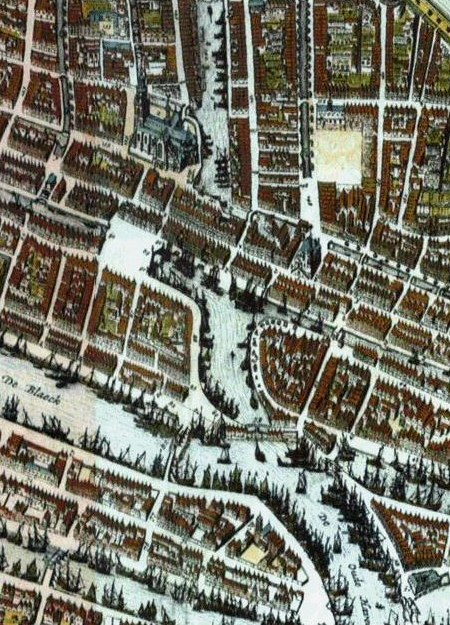
Rotterdam Stairs 1652

He studied at the University of St. Andrews, and graduated M.A. in 1615. From 1620 to 1630 he was master of the grammar school of Montrose. Having received a presentation to the parish of Rhynd, Perthshire, from Charles I, he was ordained by Archbishop Spotiswood in July 1632, and inducted to the charge by the presbytery of Perth. Petrie joined heartily in the covenanting movement, and was in 1638 a member of the general assembly held at Glasgow which overthrew episcopacy. In several subsequent assemblies he took an active part as a member of committees.

In 1642 a Scottish church was founded in Rotterdam for Scottish merchants, soldiers, and sailors, and Petrie was selected as the first minister by the presbytery of Edinburgh. He was approved by the general assembly, and was inducted by the classis or presbytery of Rotterdam on 30 Aug. 1643. The salary was provided by the States-General and the city authorities, and the church formed part of the Dutch ecclesiastical establishment; but it was exempt from the use of the Dutch liturgical formularies, and was allowed to retain the Scottish usages. The introduction of puritan innovations in the church at Rotterdam soon afterwards caused much discord, as many of the members were warmly attached to the old forms prescribed in Knox's Liturgy. These difficulties were eventually overcome, mainly owing to Petrie's influence.

In 1644 Petrie published at Rotterdam a pamphlet entitled Chiliasto Mastix, or the Prophecies in the Old and New Testament concerning the Kingdom of our Saviour Jesus Christ vindicated from the Misinterpretations of the Millenaries, and specially of Mr. Maton, in his book called “Israel's Redemption.’ Maton's book had been taken up by the independents and baptists, and had been widely circulated among Petrie's flock, and this pamphlet was written as an antidote. In 1649 Petrie was employed in some of the negotiations with Charles II, who was then in Holland. During the later years of his life he devoted much time to the preparation of his great work, A Compendious History of the Catholic Church from the year 600 until the year 1600, showing her Deformation and Reformation, &c., a folio volume published at the Hague by Adrian Black in 1662. The chief interest of the work, which displays considerable learning and research, lies in the fact that it contains copious extracts from the records of the early general assemblies of the church of Scotland, which were destroyed by fire in Edinburgh in 1701. Petrie died in September 1662. He was highly esteemed by his fellow-citizens and by the Dutch clergy, and the congregation largely increased during his ministry.

== Works ==
- Chiliasto-mastix, or the Prophecies in the Old and New Testaments vindicated from the Misinterpretations of the Millenaries (Rotterdam, 1644)
- A Compendious History of the Catholick Church, from 600 until 1600 (Hague, 1662)

== Bibliography ==
- Scot's Fasti Eccl. Scot.
- Stevens's Hist. of the Scottish Church, Rotterdam
- Baillie's Letters
- Wilson's Presbytery of Perth
- The Scottish Church, Rotterdam, 250th Anniversary, Amsterdam, 1894.

== Family ==
He married and had issue —

- Alexander, minister of the Scottish Church, Delft, died 2 June 1683;
- George, apothecary, Rotterdam;
- Christian (married Andrew Snype, minister of Campvere);
- Isabel (married (1) William Wallace, merchant, (2) Robert Allan);
- Elspeth (married George Murray).

== See also ==
- Richard Cameron
- Colonel Wallace
- Sir Robert Hamilton
- Robert Fleming
- Robert M'Ward
- John Brown of Wamphray
