= William Arnot (minister) =

Christian minister and author

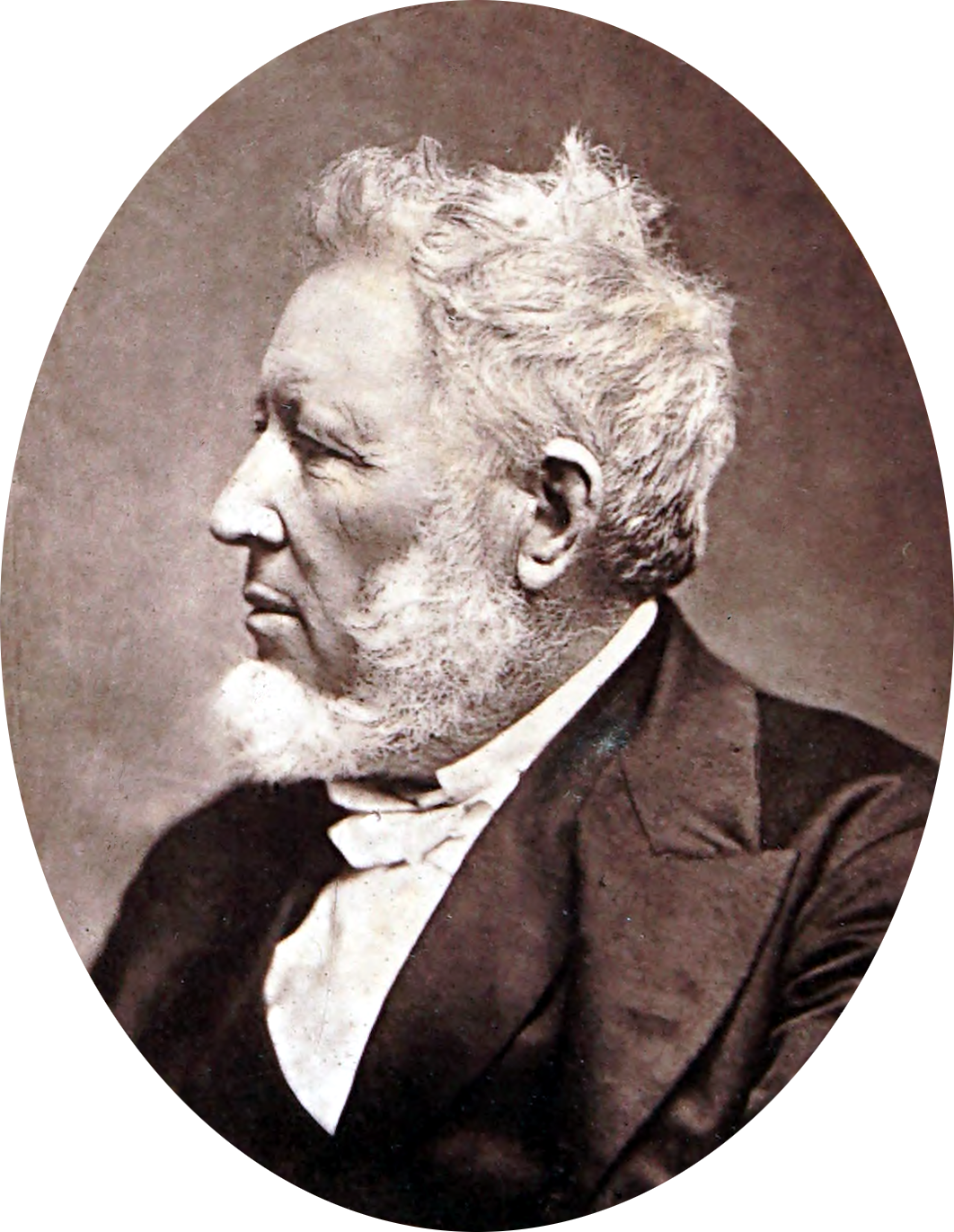
- William Arnot from autobiography

Personal details
- Born: 6 November 1808
- Died: 3 June 1875 (aged 66)

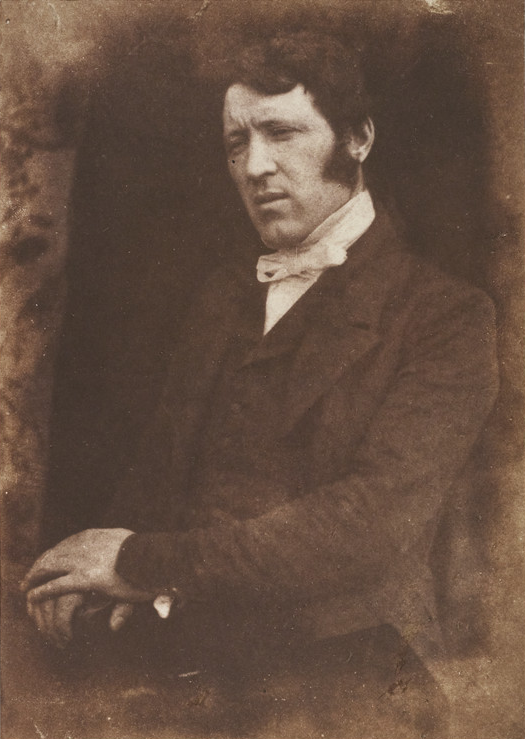
William Arnot by Hill & Adamson

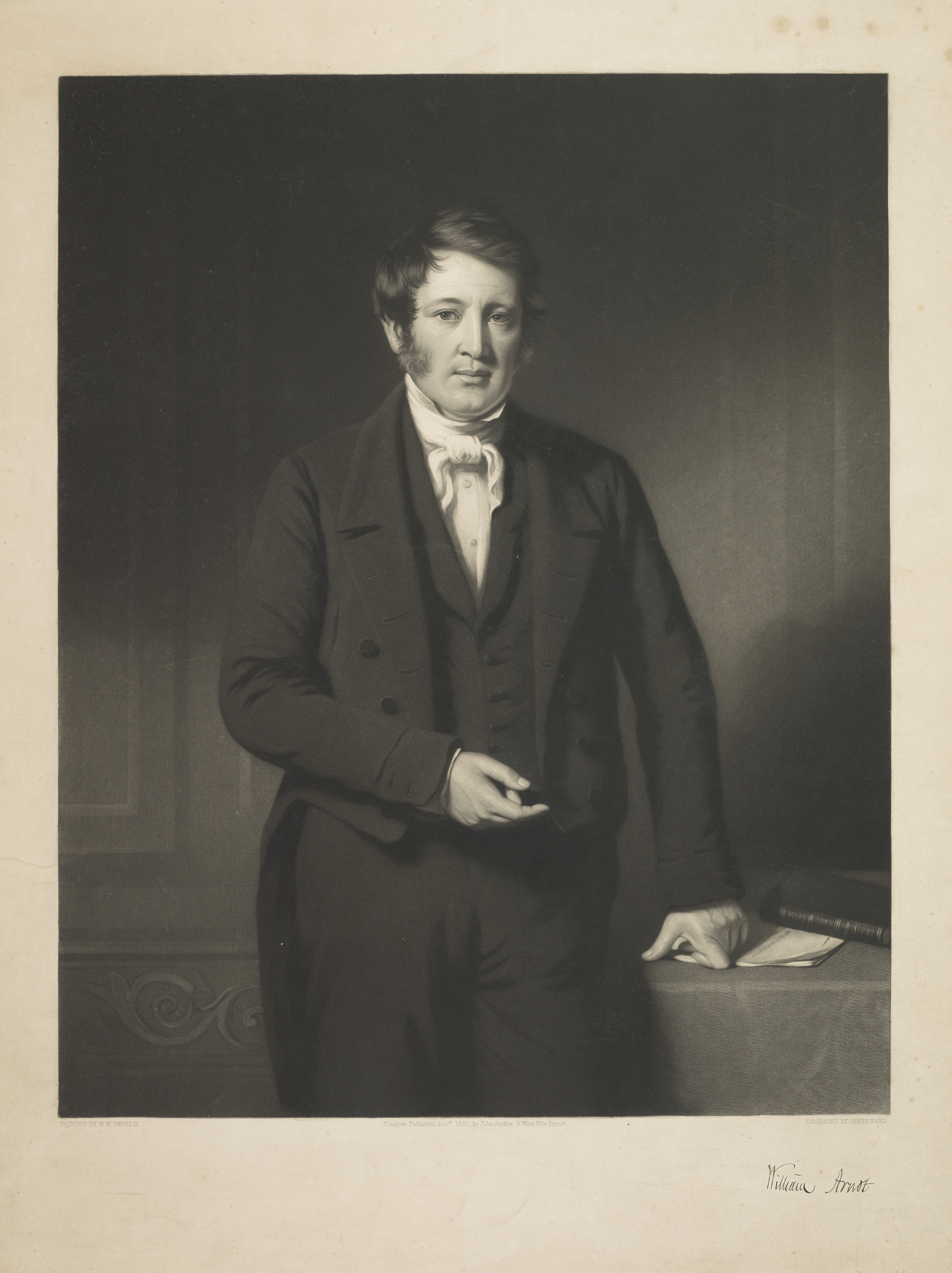
Rev. William Arnot, 1808 - 1875. St Peter's Church, Glasgow by James Faed

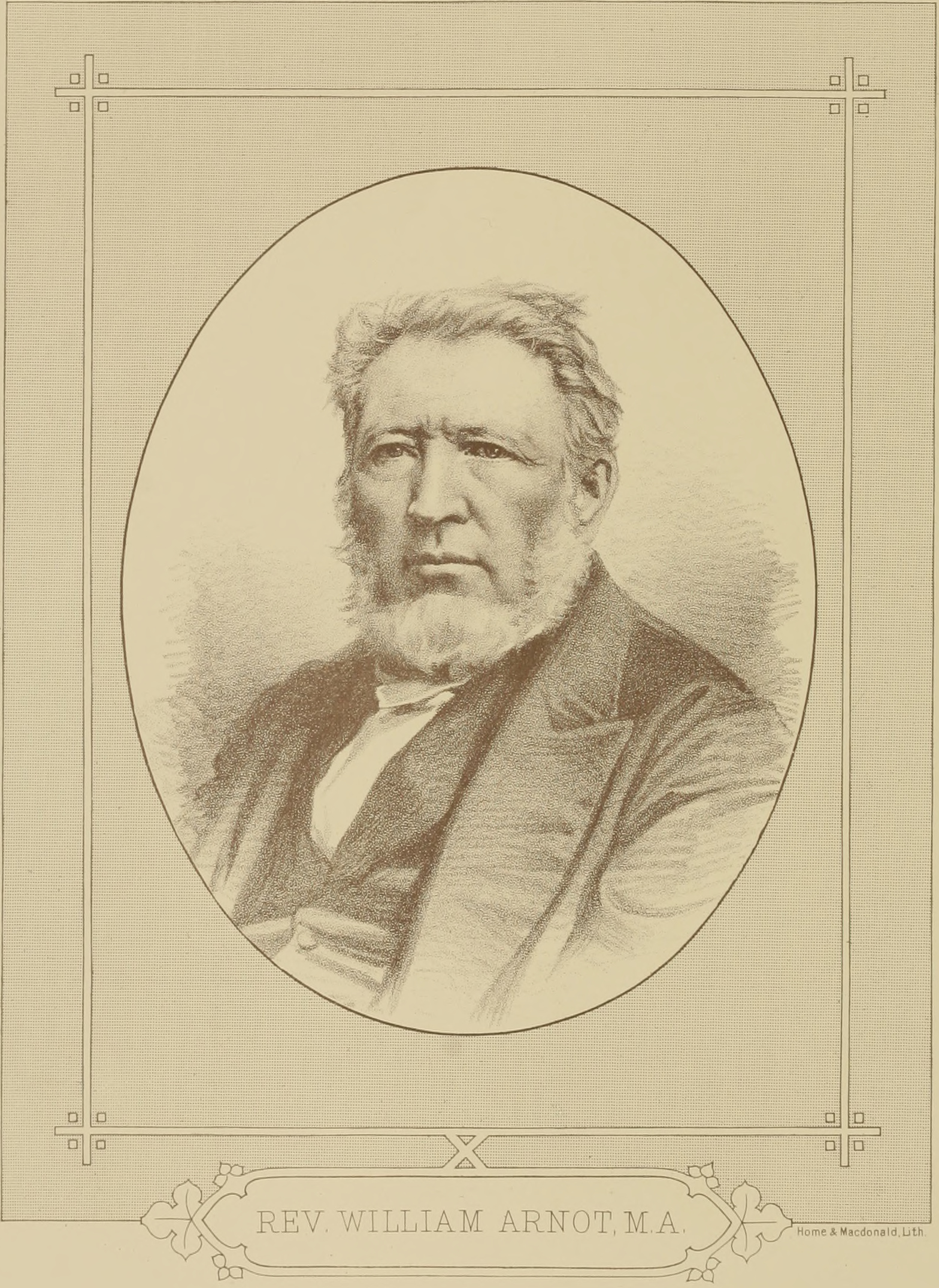
William Arnot, Free Church minister from Disruption Worthies

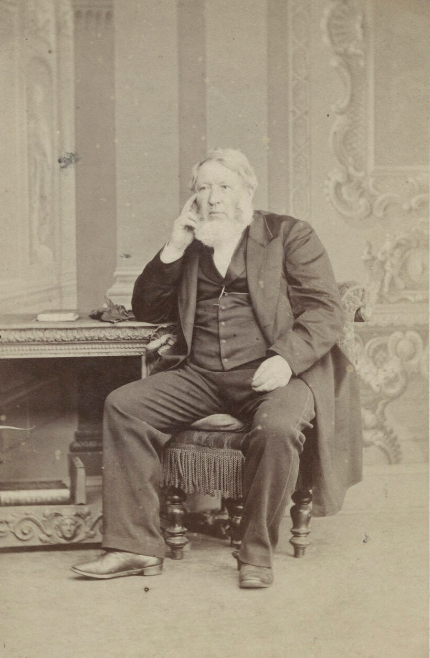
William Arnot from National Portrait Gallery by J. Gibson, Belfast

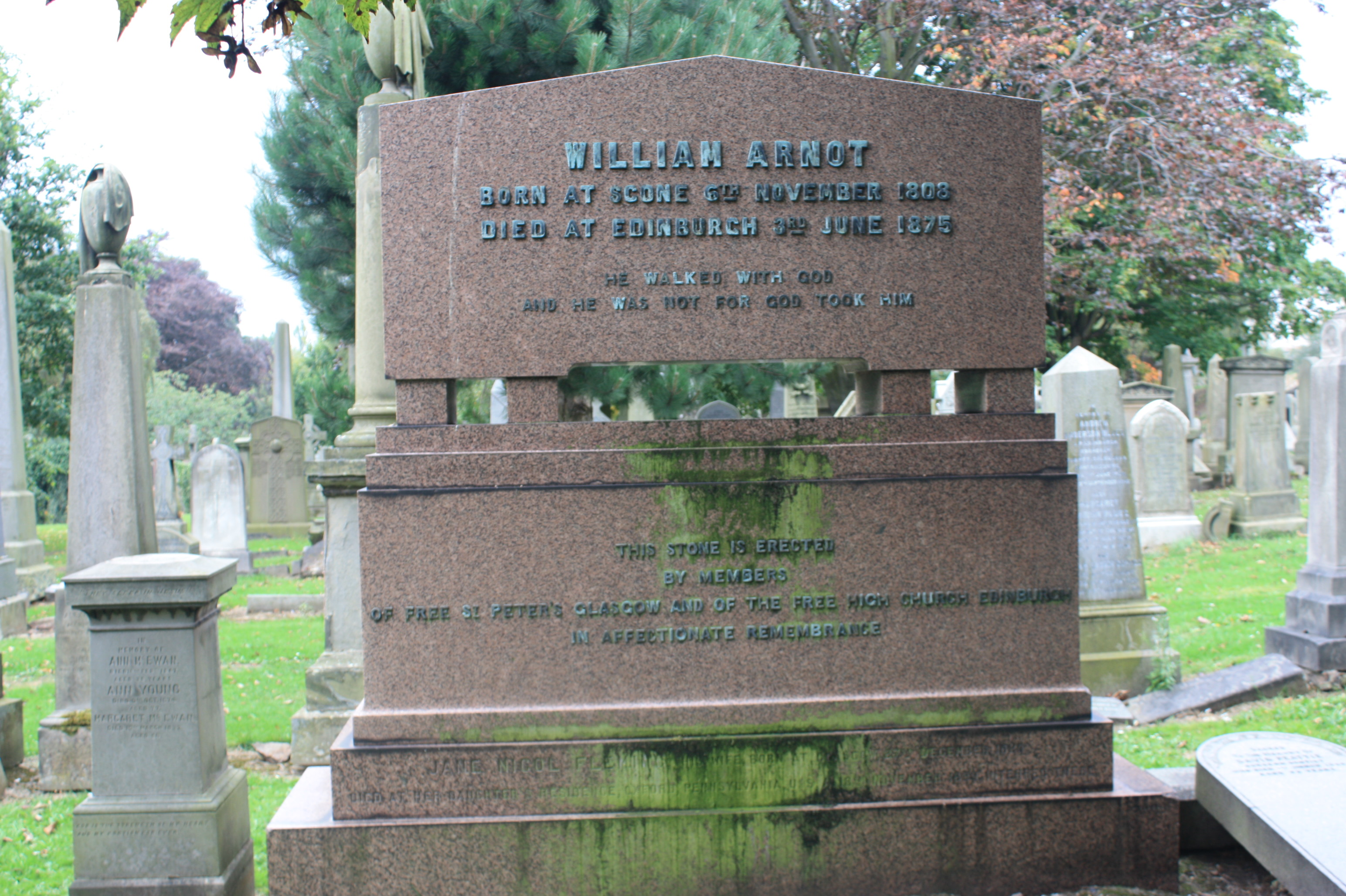
William Arnot's grave, Grange Cemetery, Edinburgh

William Arnot (1808–1875) was a Scottish minister and theological writer. He served in the Church of Scotland but moved to the Free Church of Scotland at the Disruption of 1843.

== Early life and education ==
He was born on 6 November 1808 at a farm in the parish of Forgandenny near Scone, where his father was a farmer. William was the youngest of seven children. His mother died at his birth. He was educated at the local parish school then trained as a gardener alongside his older brother Robert Arnot. He worked independently as a gardener from age 16 to 20. He then decided to study for the ministry. In November 1828 he left for Glasgow and, after a year of private study, entered Glasgow University in October 1829. He had two noteworthy classmates, whose biographies he later wrote: James Halley, who died quite young, and James Hamilton, later minister of the National Scottish Church in Regent Square, London.

== Ministry ==
After completing his theological studies he was licensed by the Church of Scotland in October 1837 and became assistant minister to Rev John Bonar of Larbert and Dunipace. In 1838 he found a patron and was ordained minister of St Peter's Church in Glasgow, one of the new quoad sacra churches built under the extension scheme of Thomas Chalmers.

At the Disruption of 1843 he left the established church and joined the Free Church of Scotland, taking a large portion of his congregation with him.

In 1863, on the appointment of Rev Dr Robert Rainy to a professorship, Arnot was called to replace Rainy as minister of the Free High Church in Edinburgh, housed in New College, Edinburgh.

While in Edinburgh, from 1871, he edited a monthly religious magazine, the Family Treasury. He three times visited America: in 1845, to minister in Canada; in 1870 as a delegate from the Free Church of Scotland to congratulate the presbyterian churches in the northern states on their reunion; and for the third time, in 1873, as a member of the Evangelical Alliance, to attend its meetings at New York. Having been a sympathiser with the northern states and the anti-slavery movement, he was well received in the United States.

The honorary degree of D.D. was offered to Arnot by the University of Glasgow, and afterwards formally by the University of New York; but for personal reasons he declined both.

== Death and legacy ==
He died after a six month illness at his home, 8 Merchiston Avenue in Edinburgh, 3 June 1875. He is buried beneath a huge but simple red granite monument in the northern half of the SE section of Grange, Cemetery in Edinburgh.

== Family ==
He married 30 June 1844, Jane, daughter of John Fleming of Clairmont, and had issue —

- Jane, born 23 December 1846
- Margaret, born 11 September 1848 (married A. Fleming)
- Robert, in America, born 22 June 1850
- a daughter, born and died 10 November 1851
- William, in America
- daughter born 10 January 1857
- son, born 9 December 1860
- Catherine Edina, born in January, and died March 1864.

== Publications ==
- Scheme of Scripture Lessons for One Year (Glasgow, 1841)
- Memoir of James Halley (Edinburgh, 1842)
- 'The Race for Riches, and some of the Pits into which the Runners fall: six lectures applying the Word of God to the traffic of man'. It had a wide circulation both in the UK and America, following up the principles of Chalmers's 'Commercial Discourses.' (1851)
- The Way of Salvation not discovered by Reason, but revealed to Faith, a sermon (Glasgow, 1843)
- Masters and Men (Edinburgh, 1852)
- The Drunkard's Progress, being a panorama of the overland route from the station of Drouth to the general terminus in the Dead Sea, in a series of thirteen views, drawn and engraved by John Adam, the descriptions given by John Bunyan, junior. (Edinburgh, 1853)
- Temperance and Total Abstinence in their Relation to the Bible and the Church (Glasgow, 1855)
- Christian Philanthropy (London, 1856)
- Laws from Heaven for Life on Earth; Illustrations of the Book of Proverbs. (London, 1857-8) [two series] This treated maxims of Hebrew wisdom viewed from a Christian standpoint in the nineteenth century.
- The church in the house

A series of lessons on the Acts of the apostles James Nesbitt & Co 1873 Co*The Grounds of Legislative Restriction applied to Public Houses (Glasgow, 1859)

- Roots and Fruits of the Christian Life (London, 1860)
- The Parables of Our Lord (Edinburgh, 1864)
- The Foe and the Fight (Glasgow, n.d.)
- Reminiscences of the Auchterarder Case
- Lesser Parables of Our Lord
- Lessons of Grace in the Language of Nature
- Life of James Hamilton, D.D. (London, 1870)
- Scottish Temperance Tract, No. 70
- Lectures IV. (On Infidelity)
- III. (On the Social Condition of the People)
- VII. (On Revival of Religion).
- 'This Present World.' Some thoughts on the adaptation of man's home to the tenant.
- A posthumous volume of sermons.
