= Burnes Road =

Street in Karachi, Pakistan

- Muhammad Bin Qasim Road
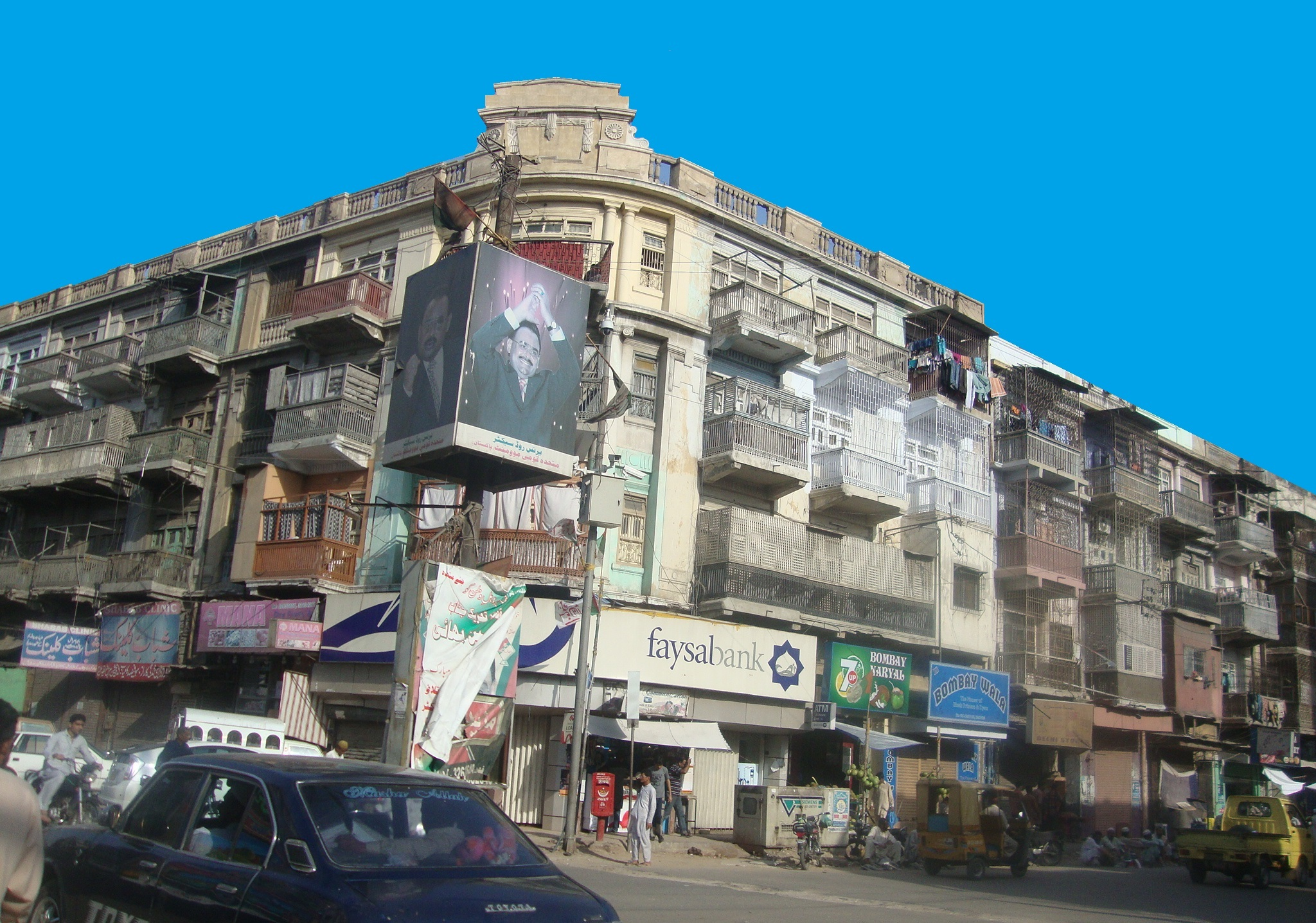
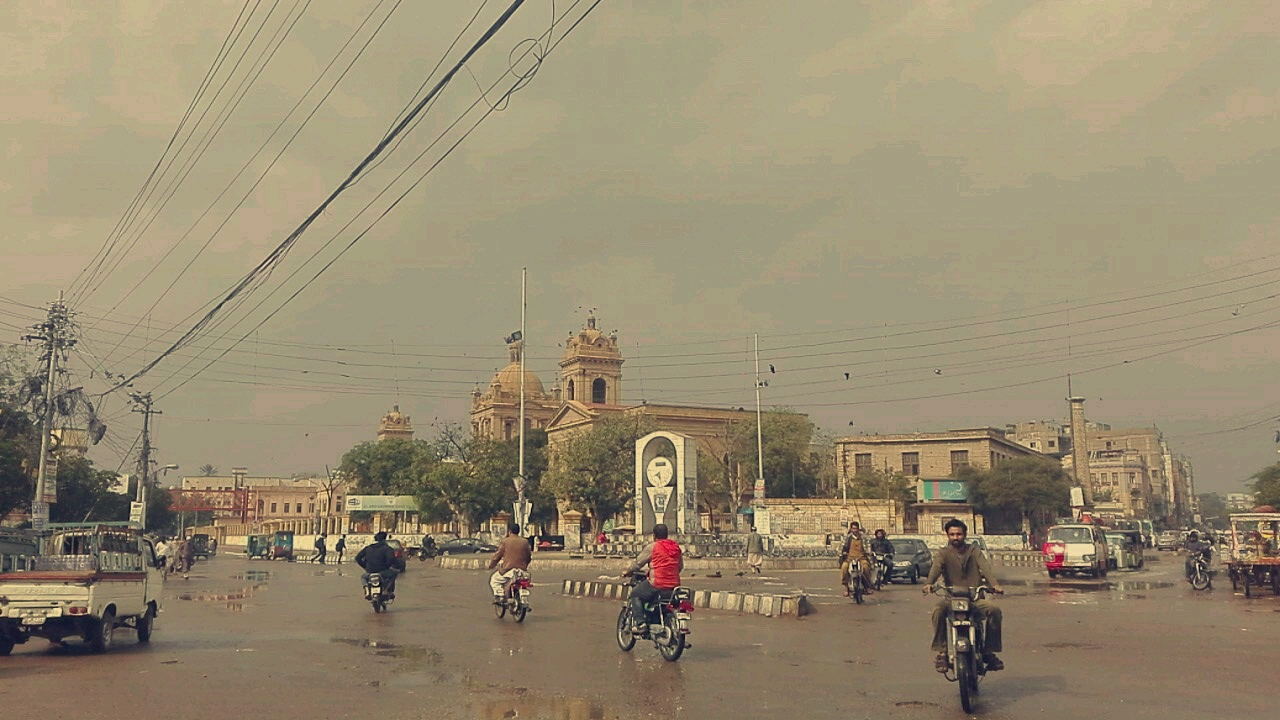
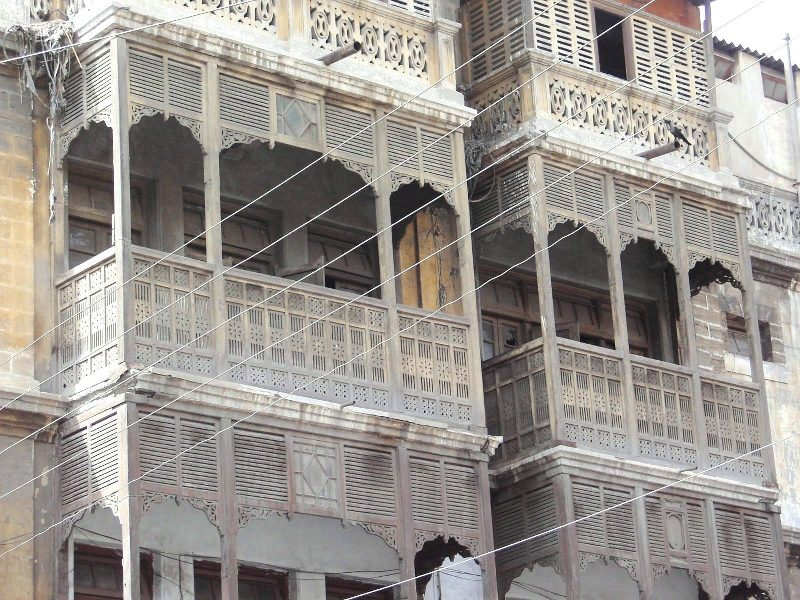
- From top to bottom: Fresco Chowk, panoramic view of the street, old buildings on Burnes Road
- Interactive map of Burnes Road
- Namesake: James Burnes
- Maintained by: District Municipal Corporation (DMC) South Karachi
- Area: Burnes Road, M.A. Jinnah Road
- Addresses: Burnes Road, Karachi, Sindh, Pakistan
- Postal code: 75500
- Coordinates: 24.8567°N 67.0162°E

Other
- Known for: Food street vendors
- Status: Active

Burnes Road, erroneously spelled as Burns Road, and officially known as Muhammad Bin Qasim Road, is a food street located in Karachi, Pakistan. It is well known in the city for its many restaurants and street food vendors.

== History ==
Burnes Road was named after the Scottish doctor and spy, James Burnes, who worked in colonial British India in 19th century. The street is famous for its restaurants many of which were founded in the 1940s.

The street is considered a melting pot and is home to people of different ethnicities, including Punjabi Saudagaran-e-Delhi, Memons, Gaddis, and Qureshi Baradri.

== Major restaurants ==
- Fresco Sweets
- Delhi Rabri House
- Waheed Kebab House

== In popular culture ==
The 2008 series Burns Road Ki Nilofer is set here. The name of this street or neighborhood is also used in the 2024 Pakistani television series Burns Road Kay Romeo Juliet, which stars Hamza Sohail and Iqra Aziz. Filming for the series took place on site.
