= Fionn MacColla =

Scottish novelist (1906–1975)

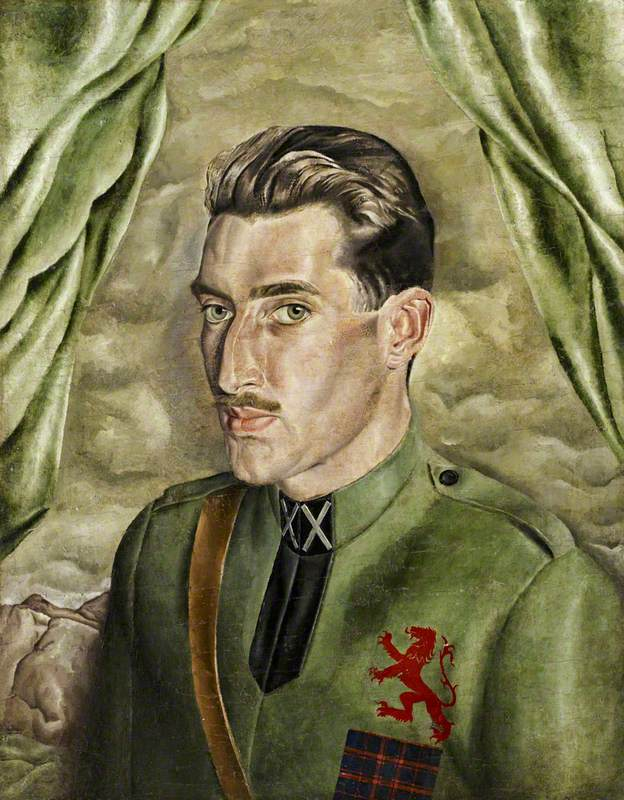
Fionn MacColla (painting by Edward Baird, 1932)

Fionn Mac Colla (born Thomas Douglas MacDonald; 4 March 1906 – 20 July 1975) was a Scottish novelist closely connected to the Scottish Gaelic language and culture who campaigned for it to return to what he perceived to be its rightful place in the Scottish mainstream. He was a good personal friend of Hugh MacDiarmid and Helen Cruickshank.

== Life ==
Mac Colla was born in Montrose to Donald and Jessie Macdonald (née Anderson Douglas). His father was a native Gaelic speaker, and it is from his father that MacColla was made aware of the language as a young boy. As a child, Mac Colla's family were Plymouth Brethren, although he converted to Roman Catholicism in later life.

After graduating first in the country for his teaching exams, Mac Colla was appointed headmaster of Laide Public school in Wester Ross at the age of 19. The following year he left for Palestine to teach history for a school run by the United Free Church. He remained in Palestine for 3 years, before returning to Scotland permanently in 1929.

Mac Colla was a founding member of the National Party of Scotland from its birth in 1928. He was a close friend of the artist Edward Baird, also a member of the National Party of Scotland, who portrayed him, wearing a nationalist quasi-military uniform in Portrait of a Young Scotsman, acquired by the National Galleries of Scotland in 2011. According to Martin Hopkinson, "It was James Whyte, a St Andrews-based American supporter of the Nationalists and patron of contemporary Scottish art and culture, who bought Baird's portrait of Mac Colla, a painting that has sadly disappeared."

His best known novels are The Albannach and And the Cock Crew. And the Cock Crew takes its title from the gospel story of Peter the disciple who ended up denying and thus betraying Jesus. The protagonist is a minister in a Highland parish, Sachari, whose congregation is being cleared. The Albannach has a modern (20th century) setting, and makes wry comments on contemporary Gaelic, and general Scottish attitudes. Fionn Mac Colla is commemorated in Makars' Court, outside The Writers' Museum, Lawnmarket, Edinburgh.

After nearly 20 years living in the Western Isles, Mac Colla returned to Edinburgh, where he died of heart failure in Edinburgh Royal Infirmary on 20 July 1975.

Selections for Makars' Court are made by The Writers' Museum; The Saltire Society; The Scottish Poetry Library.

== Bibliography ==
- The Albannach (1932)
- And the Cock Crew (1945)
- "Mein Bumpf" in Essays on Fionn Mac Colla, edited by David Morrison (1973) – autobiographical essay and non-fiction. "Bumpf" is WWII slang for propaganda or tedious printed information and is a satirical pun on Hitler's autobiography.
- Ro Fhada Mar So a tha Mi (Too Long in this Condition) (1975) – Autobiography
- Scottish Noel (1958).
- At the Sign of the Clenched Fist – (1967). Philosophical Polemic
- The Ministers (1979).
- Move Up, John (1994).
- Ane Tryall of Heretiks (play, Edinburgh Festival 1963).

Some of his articles and other works can be found in contemporary magazines of Scotland such as Catalyst.

== Reviews ==
- Neill, William (1976), review of Ro Fhada Mar So a Mi, in Burnett, Ray (ed.), Calgacus No. 3, Spring 1976, p. 51, ISSN 0307-2029
