= Glen Doll =

Coordinates: 56°52′00″N 03°13′00″W

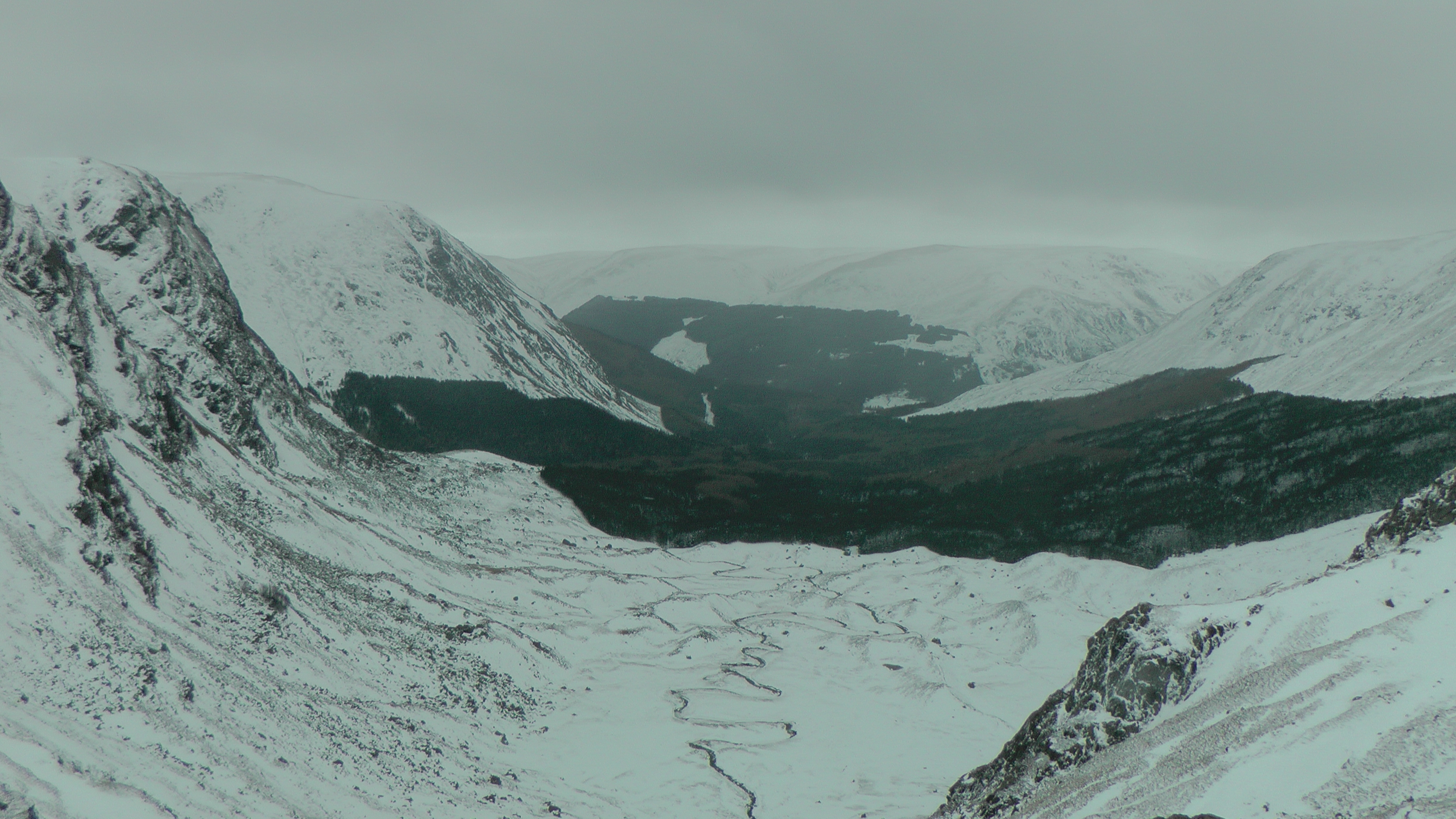
Glen Doll

Glen Doll, also sometimes spelt Glendoll, lies within the Cairngorms National Park, Scotland, at the top of Glen Clova, in an area of steep hills, corries and Munros. It includes the Corrie Fee National Nature Reserve, which has many endangered plants.

The nearest town is Kirriemuir. The glen is in the south eastern Grampians, and the river which runs through it drains into Glen Clova, which extends towards the coast of Angus.

An ancient track, Jock's Road, that starts in the glen, ends at Braemar. The origin of the name is that Duncan Macpherson, a rich Scot, returned from Australia in the late 19th century, bought the Glen Doll estate, and sought to ban people from crossing his land. John (or Jock) Winter fought him, and the Scottish Rights of Way and Access Society took a challenge through all the courts to the House of Lords, finally winning the day in 1888.

Deer stalking takes place in the glen in late summer and autumn.

A popular walk heads south west through the Glendoll Forest before climbing steeply up the Kilbo Path that links Glen Doll with Glen Prosen. At the top this reaches a high pass giving easy access to two Munros, these are Driesh to the east and Mayar to the west.

In April 1998, Angus Council instituted a Ranger Service for the Angus Glens, with two full-time rangers, which has its base in Glen Doll.

The Forestry Commission has an alpine forest in the Glen.
