= Corrie Fee =

Corrie and nature reserve in Angus, Scotland

Corrie Fee National Nature Reserve
- IUCN category IV (habitat/species management area)
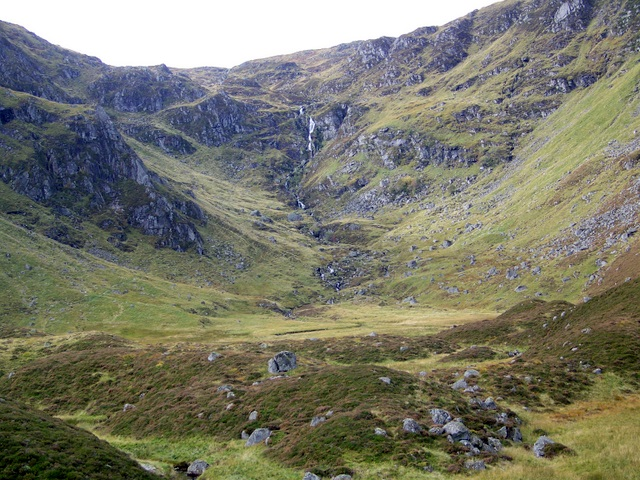
- The Corrie of Fee

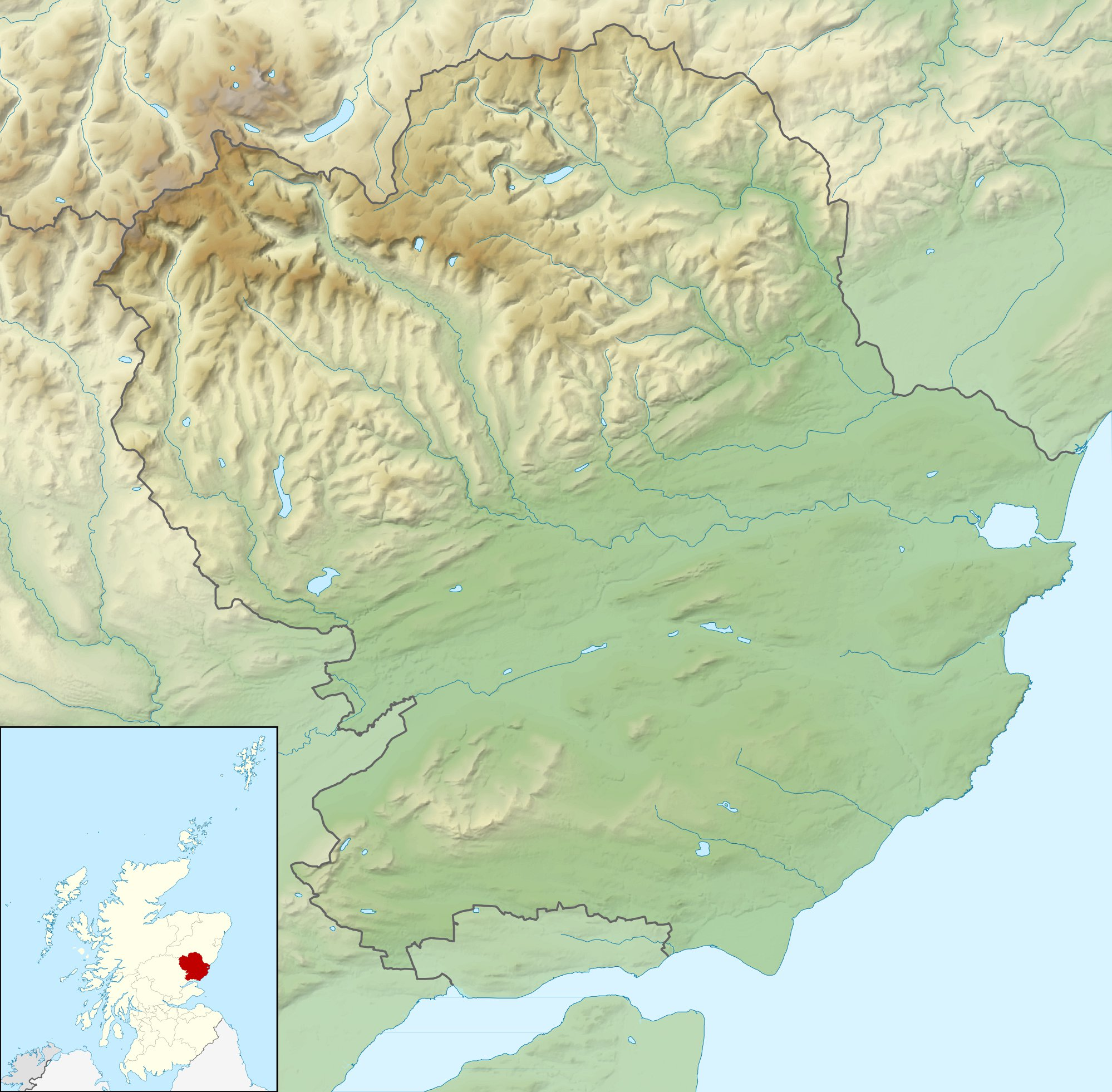
- Location within Angus
- Location: Kirriemuir, Angus, Scotland
- Coordinates: 56°51′41″N 3°13′44″W
- Area: 164 ha (410 acres)
- Established: 2005
- Governing body: NatureScot
- Website: Corrie Fee National Nature Reserve

Corrie Fee is a glacier-carved corrie situated at the head of Glen Clova in the Angus Glens of Scotland. It forms part of Corrie Fee National Nature Reserve (NNR), which is managed by NatureScot and lies within the Cairngorms National Park. The adjoining Corrie Sharroch and the slopes of Craig Rennet are also included in the NNR.

The corrie is considered to be one of the finest examples of a glacial corrie in the British Isles, with its steep cliffs forming a natural amphitheatre. The wider reserve hosts many rare arctic-alpine plants, including the largest area of montane willow scrub in Scotland, which is found at Corrie Sharroch. The importance of the area's flora has been recognised by botanists since the 18th Century, and the site is now protected by numerous national and international conservation designations.

== Geology and geomorphology ==
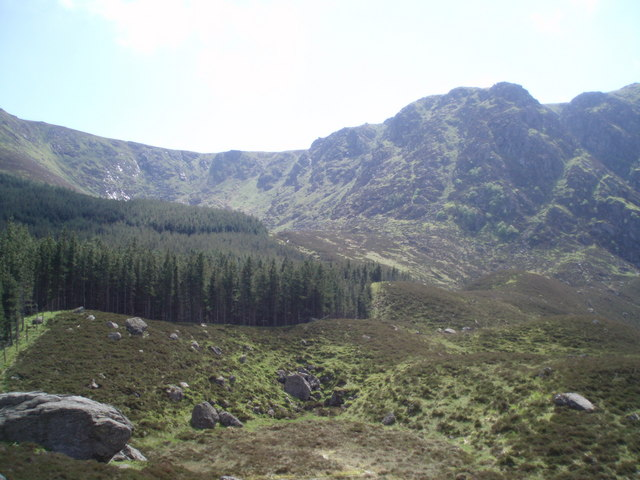
Morraines in Corrie Fee

Corrie Fee has a complex geology, consisting of many different types of rock. Underlying the area are metamorphic rocks known as Dalradian rocks, which were formed around 600 million years ago during a period when the continent of Laurentia, which included Scotland and North America, began to collide with two other continents, Baltica (modern Scandinavia) and Avalonia (modern England). Dalradian rocks tend to be acidic, however at Corrie Fee there are also more basic rocks that are derived from muddy lime-rich sediments and volcanic material. These basic rocks are easily eroded, and form calcium-rich soils that support many lime-loving plants. The corrie also has outcrops of amphibolite, and intrusions of magma have formed sills that have a similar composition to the amphibolite.

The current landscape of the Scottish Highlands was largely formed during the last ice age. At Corrie Fee, small independent glaciers cut corries during the last period of the Ice Age, called the Loch Lomond Readvance, when the weight and movement of the ice ground out the bottom and wore back the sides of the corrie to produce the steep, U-shape amphitheatre of cliffs evident today. The glaciers deposited the eroded spoil as moraines. There are several types of moraine on the corrie floor, including lateral boulder moraines, fluted moraines below the corrie lip, and hummocky moraines. The presence of these moraines has led the Fee Burn to take a highly meandering path through the lower corrie.

== Flora and fauna ==
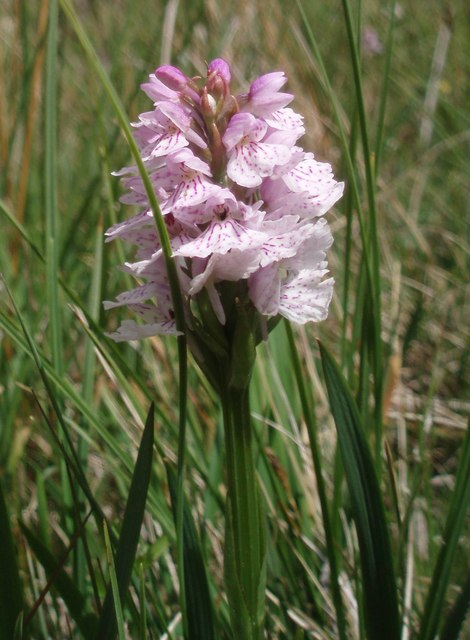
Heath Spotted Orchid in Corrie Fee

The Corrie Fee NNR supports Scotland's largest area of montane willow scrub, which is found in Corrie Sharroch in the southern part of the reserve. This type of habitat is one of the rarest and most endangered in the UK, and is now found only in the higher mountains of the Scottish Highlands, chiefly in the central Highlands. It survives as an example of the typical vegetation of the post-glacial period, growing on moist, relatively base-rich soils: due to the effects of grazing by Scottish red deer and sheep it is now only found on lightly grazed areas such as ledges, steep rocky slopes or boulder fields. In 2009, following fears that the montane willow scrub plants were isolated and unable to reproduce, more than 800 young montane willow shrubs were planted in the NNR by Scottish Natural Heritage and the Royal Botanic Garden Edinburgh.

Many other rare plants are also found at Corrie Fee. These include purple colt's-foot, which although common in Scandinavia and the Alps, is found nowhere else in Britain. This plant was first noted at Corrie Fee in 1813 by George Don, and it has been speculated that he may have introduced it to the corrie. Other rarities include yellow oxytropis, alpine blue sow-thistle, and two species of small woodsia fern: alpine woodsia and oblong woodsia.

Many species of mountain birds, including ring ouzel, peregrine falcons, twite and raven can be seen in the NNR, and are joined by swallows and house martins during the summer. Golden eagles can occasionally be seen hunting over the reserve. Corrie Fee supports many species of mammal, including red deer, red fox, pine marten, European mole, common shrew, European rabbit, least weasel, bank vole, short-tailed field vole and wood mouse. Over-grazing by deer is known to be detrimental to many of the rare plants present in the NNR, and in 1991 a fence was erected to enclose an area of around 60 ha in Corrie Sharroch. Efforts have also been made to reduce deer numbers across the wider Caenlochan area in order to reduce grazing pressure by agreement with neighbouring estates.

== Conservation designations ==
Corrie Fee first became part of a National Nature Reserve in 1961, when the Caenlochan NNR was designated. This NNR covered a much wider area than the current reserve, and was mostly under private ownership. In 1985 the Nature Conservancy Council, the predecessor organisation to SNH, purchased 164 ha of land within the NNR at Corrie Fee and Corrie Sharroch. In 2000 SNH began a review of NNRs, reflecting the fact that other conservation designations now offered stronger protection than was previously available: this resulted in the NNR being reduced and renamed in 2005, with the new Corrie Fee NNR being confined to the area under SNH ownership. The Corrie Fee NNR is classified as a Category VI protected area by the International Union for Conservation of Nature.

The wider Caenlochan area continues to have statutory protection as a Special Area of Conservation, a Site of Special Scientific Interest, and a Special Protection Area for upland breeding birds. A second SPA designation, Cairngorms Massif, also covers the area of the NNR.

Corrie Fee also lies within the Cairngorms National Park and the Deeside and Lochnagar National Scenic Area.

== Visitors ==
Around 14,000 visitors visit the Corrie Fee National Nature Reserve each year. In 2008 a visitor centre was constructed at end of the public road in Glen Doll by a partnership of Angus Council, Scottish Natural Heritage, the Cairngorms National Park Authority and Forestry and Land Scotland. From the centre a path follows the Fee Burn, through Glen Doll Forest (owned by Forestry and Land Scotland), to reach Corrie Fee; the path continues up through the corrie to reach the summit plateau. From the visitor centre to the top of the corrie is a distance of about 5 km. The path through Corrie Fee is one of the main routes to and from the summit of Mayar, which is often climbed in conjunction with its neighbour Dreish.

Corrie Fee is a noted location for winter climbing, with many short routes. NatureScot have expressed concerns that climbing on routes in the spring may disturb breeding raptors.
