= Clova =

Clova may refer to:

== Places ==
- Clova, Angus, a community in Scotland
- Clova, Quebec, a community in Canada
  - Clova railway station, Via Rail station in Clova, Quebec
- Glen Clova, one of the Five Glens of Angus in Scotland

== Other uses ==
- Clova (virtual assistant), an intelligent personal assistant
- Clova Court (born 1960), English heptathlete
