= Kinnordy House =

House in Angus, Scotland

Coordinates: 56.6828°N 3.0346°W

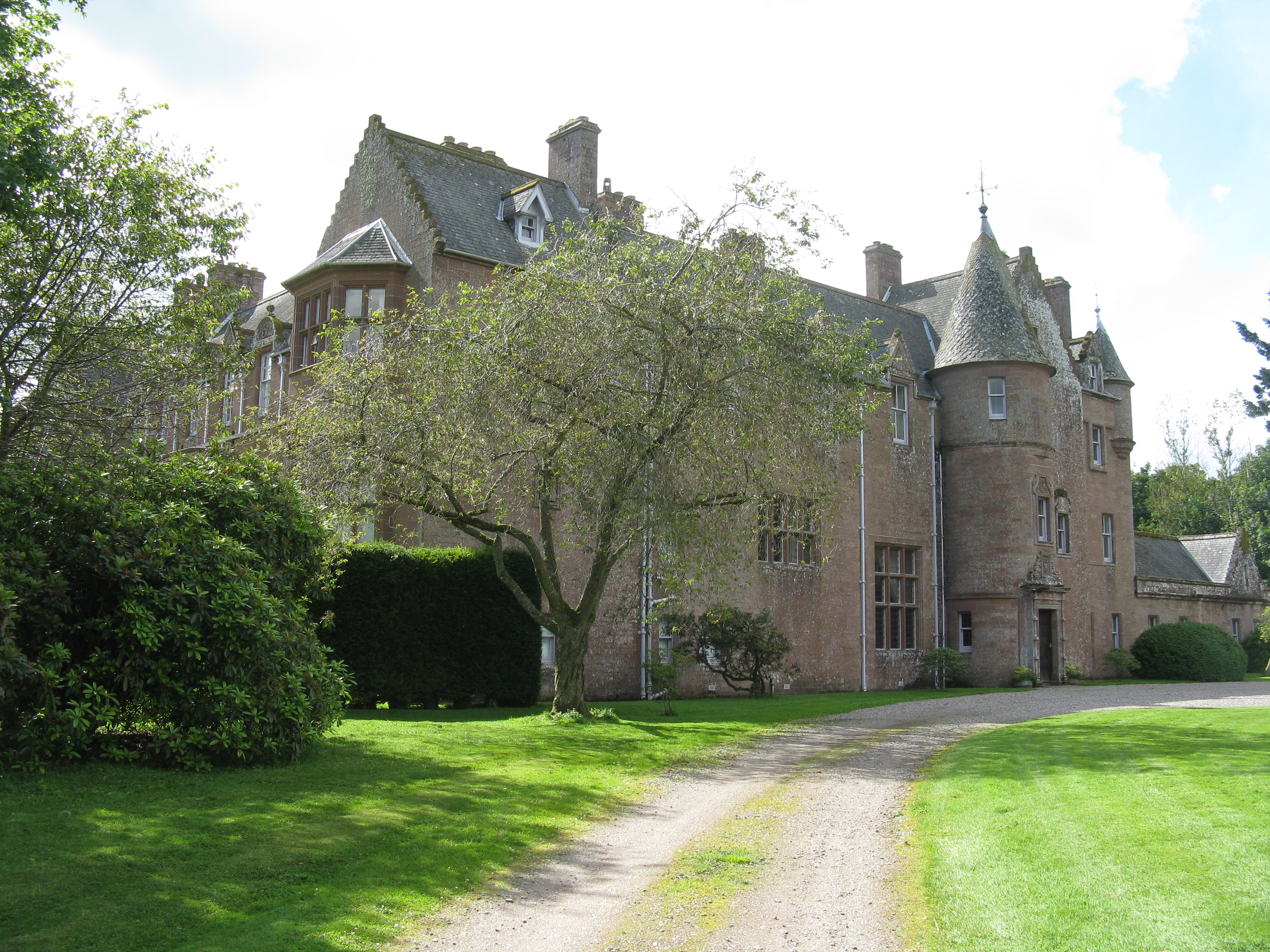
Kinnordy House

Kinnordy House (alternative spellings: Kynnordy, Kinardy, Kinnordie and Kinorde) is an estate house near Kirriemuir in Angus, Scotland. The first house was built in the 1680s, when Inverquharity Castle was vacated; however, the current three-storey, towered and turreted structure dates from 1881, incorporating an 18th-century wing and stables. The house was the birthplace of the noted geologist Charles Lyell, and is associated with his friend Charles Darwin.

== History ==
The walled garden was built after the Jacobite rising of 1745, by the "Nameless Highlanders".

On 28 November 1782 the entrepreneur Charles Lyell bought Inverquharity and Kinnordy from Sir John Ogilvy. An observatory was added by his son, the botanist Charles Lyell.

The house was designated a Category B listed building in 1980. Many of the associated buildings and structures are also listed: the home farm, the East Lodge and its gates, the Causewayend Cottages (now the Kinnordy Estate Office), the museum and observatory, the walled garden, sundial and Bell Gate.

== See also ==
- List of listed buildings in Kirriemuir, Angus
- Loch of Kinnordy, a Site of Special Scientific Interest, see List of Sites of Special Scientific Interest in Angus and Dundee
- Ogilvy baronets
- Lyell baronets
- Baron Lyell
