= Inverquharity Castle =

Castle in Angus, Scotland

Coordinates: 56°42′34″N 2°57′48″W

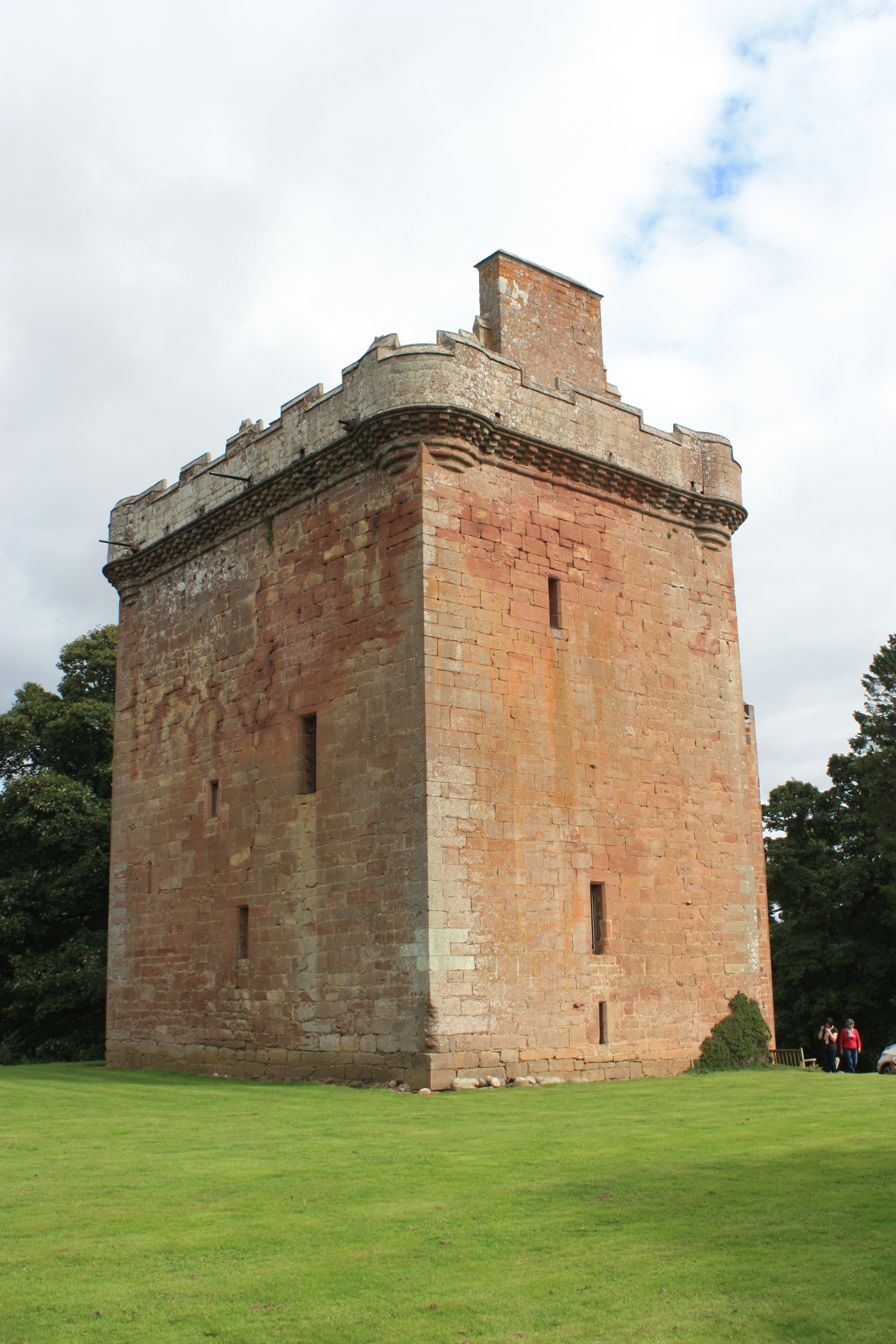
- The castle in 2013
- Interactive map of Inverquharity Castle

Inverquharity Castle is a 15th-century tower house in Angus, Scotland. It lies around 4.5 kilometres (2.8 mi) north-east of Kirriemuir near the River South Esk.

== History ==
The lands of Inverquharity came to the Ogilvie family in around 1420. The castle was first constructed as a rectangular tower in the 1440s, by Alexander Ogilvie, 2nd Lord Inverquharity. In the 16th century, a wing was added to form a four-storey L-plan castle.

In 1445, a dispute between Alexander Ogilvy of Inverquharity and the son of the Earl of Crawford from nearby Finavon Castle culminated in the Battle of Arbroath in which Ogilvy and the Earl were killed.

In the late 18th century, the tower was sold by the 5th Ogilvy Baronet, and the wing demolished. The castle decayed until the 1960s, when it was restored and the wing rebuilt. The original 15th-century yett, or iron gate, is still in place. In 2014, a BBC documentary followed the sale of the castle from the owners who had restored and lived there for the previous 40 years. It sold in 2012 for £611,000 to Chris Law and this category A listed building remains a private family home.

== See also ==
- Kinnordy House
