= List of listed buildings in Kirriemuir, Angus =

This is a list of listed buildings in the parish of Kirriemuir in Angus, Scotland.

== List ==
Name	Location	Date listed	Geo-coordinates	Notes	Category	LB number	Image
Angus Milling Company Building ("The Little Kirk") Glengate			56°40′26″N 3°00′22″W		C(S)	36876	Upload Photo
18, 20 Glengate			56°40′24″N 3°00′21″W		C(S)	36879	Upload Photo
36-42 Glengate			56°40′24″N 3°00′22″W		C(S)	36882	Upload Photo
Barrie's Land, Church Lane, Off Glengate			56°40′25″N 3°00′26″W		C(S)	36885	Upload Photo
Kirklee, Church Lane Off Glengate			56°40′24″N 3°00′24″W		C(S)	36886	Upload Photo
Airlie Arms Hotel, St. Malcolm's Wynd			56°40′26″N 3°00′19″W		B	36890	Upload Photo
5, 7 The Tenements. Brechin Road			56°40′27″N 3°00′07″W		B	36893	Upload Photo
"Window In Thrums" Cottage 7 Glamis Road			56°40′13″N 3°00′11″W		B	36905	Upload Photo
'The Cottage' 9 Glamis Road			56°40′13″N 3°00′11″W		C(S)	36906	Upload Photo
18 Glamis Road			56°40′09″N 3°00′13″W		C(S)	36914	Upload Photo
11-15 High Street			56°40′24″N 3°00′16″W		C(S)	36817	Upload Photo
35-37 High Street, Front Building Only			56°40′22″N 3°00′16″W		B	36822	Upload Photo
1-3 Kirk Wynd			56°40′22″N 3°00′14″W		B	36828	Upload Photo
24 Kirk Wynd			56°40′22″N 3°00′11″W		C(S)	36837	Upload Photo
White Horse Hotel 1, 3, 5 Bellie's Brae			56°40′22″N 3°00′17″W		C(S)	36841	Upload Photo
25 Marywell Brae			56°40′24″N 3°00′08″W		C(S)	36861	Upload Photo
19, 21 Roods			56°40′26″N 3°00′17″W		C(S)	36867	Upload Photo
10, 12 Roods, Roods Bar			56°40′26″N 3°00′18″W		C(S)	36870	Upload Photo
15-19 Glengate			56°40′25″N 3°00′20″W		B	36874	Upload Photo
Hall (Former North Free Church) Glengate And St. Malcolm's Wynd			56°40′25″N 3°00′22″W		C(S)	36875	Upload Photo
Inverquharity Castle			56°42′34″N 2°57′48″W		A	11665	Upload Photo
Kinnordy - Home Farm			56°41′04″N 3°01′53″W		B	11677	Upload Photo
Causewayend Smithy			56°41′10″N 3°01′30″W		B	11680	Upload Photo
"Barellan Cottage", Maryton			56°40′02″N 2°59′21″W		C(S)	11682	Upload Photo
Ballindarg South Entrance Gates			56°38′55″N 2°58′09″W		B	11690	Upload Photo
Alcorn, Glengate			56°40′24″N 3°00′23″W		C(S)	36881	Upload Photo
6, 10 St. Malcolm's Wynd			56°40′26″N 3°00′20″W		C(S)	36891	Upload Photo
Collection Of Cross-Slabs Within Timber Shelter Cemetery Of Kirriemuir			56°40′41″N 2°59′54″W		B	36904	Upload Photo
Former South Church (Now Chapel Of Rest And Furniture Store - Wm. A. Lawson) Including Walls And Railings Of Churchyard, Glamis Road			56°40′12″N 3°00′13″W		B	36907	Upload Photo
22, 24 High Street			56°40′23″N 3°00′14″W		C(S)	36819	Upload Photo
48 High Street			56°40′24″N 3°00′18″W		C(S)	36827	Upload Photo
2, 4, 5 William Street			56°40′19″N 3°00′17″W		C(S)	36847	Upload Photo
Thrums Hotel, 25 Bank Street (West Section Only)			56°40′25″N 3°00′09″W		B	36859	Upload Photo
1-5 School Wynd			56°40′25″N 3°00′08″W		C(S)	36860	Upload Photo
19 Marywell Brae			56°40′24″N 3°00′06″W		C(S)	36863	Upload Photo
Kinnordy - East Lodge Gates			56°40′43″N 3°00′59″W		C(S)	11679	Upload Photo
Ballinshoe Farmsteading - Principal Range			56°39′55″N 2°57′31″W		B	49886	Upload Photo
St. Ninian's Church Glengate			56°40′25″N 3°00′23″W		C(S)	36883	Upload Photo
Seceder Hall, Seceder Close And Church Lane Off Glengate			56°40′25″N 3°00′25″W		B	36884	Upload Photo
Tannage Brae And 1 Croft Head			56°40′24″N 3°00′21″W		C(S)	36888	Upload Photo
Folda, Off Roods And Douglas Street			56°40′35″N 3°00′26″W		C(S)	36900	Upload Photo
Hillroad Cottages			56°40′55″N 3°00′16″W		C(S)	36901	Upload Photo
25, 27 High Street			56°40′23″N 3°00′14″W		C(S)	36820	Upload Photo
9, 11, 13 Kirk Wynd			56°40′21″N 3°00′11″W		C(S)	36831	Upload Photo
Gairie Linen Works, Bellie's Brae			56°40′19″N 3°00′13″W		C(S)	36844	Upload Photo
46 Bank Street			56°40′23″N 3°00′09″W		C(S)	36853	Upload Photo
19 Bank Street			56°40′24″N 3°00′11″W		C(S)	36857	Upload Photo
4, 6, 8 Roods			56°40′25″N 3°00′18″W		C(S)	36869	Upload Photo
Logie House			56°39′23″N 2°59′29″W		B	13778	Upload Photo
Sheilhill Bridge Over River South Esk			56°42′37″N 2°56′16″W		B	11667	Upload another image
"Sintra Cottage" And Adjoining Roundyhill			56°38′16″N 3°00′59″W		C(S)	11686	Upload Photo
Ballindarg House			56°38′56″N 2°58′09″W		B	11689	Upload Photo
12-16 Glengate			56°40′24″N 3°00′20″W		C(S)	36878	Upload Photo
13 The Tenements Brechin Road			56°40′27″N 3°00′05″W		C(S)	36897	Upload Photo
2-6 Glamis Road And 1-5 Forfar Road			56°40′12″N 3°00′10″W		B	36909	Upload Photo
Sydney Cottage, 4 Manse Lane Off Glamis Road			56°40′11″N 3°00′11″W		C(S)	36911	Upload Photo
Reform Street, Town Hall And Library			56°40′27″N 3°00′10″W		C(S)	36916	Upload another image
Bank Street/School Wynd, K6 Telephone Kiosk			56°40′24″N 3°00′08″W		B	36917	Upload Photo
Kirriemuir Barony Parish Church, High Street And Bank Street			56°40′22″N 3°00′12″W		B	36810	Upload Photo
Town House 31 High Street			56°40′22″N 3°00′15″W		B	36812	Upload another image
Ogilvy Arms Hotel 6, 7, 8 High Street			56°40′25″N 3°00′18″W		C(S)	36815	Upload Photo
2, 4 Bellie's Brae			56°40′22″N 3°00′15″W		C(S)	36839	Upload Photo
26, 28 Bank Street			56°40′24″N 3°00′11″W		C(S)	36849	Upload Photo
30-34 Bank Street			56°40′23″N 3°00′10″W		C(S)	36850	Upload Photo
42, 44 Bank Street			56°40′23″N 3°00′09″W		C(S)	36852	Upload Photo
Bank Of Scotland, 11 Bank Street			56°40′25″N 3°00′13″W		B	36855	Upload Photo
13-17 Bank Street			56°40′24″N 3°00′11″W		B	36856	Upload Photo
Royal Bank Of Scotland 23 Bank Street			56°40′25″N 3°00′10″W		C(S)	36858	Upload Photo
21-23 Marywell Brae			56°40′24″N 3°00′07″W		C(S)	36862	Upload Photo
14, 16 Roods			56°40′26″N 3°00′18″W		C(S)	36871	Upload Photo
7-13 Glengate			56°40′24″N 3°00′20″W		C(S)	36873	Upload Photo
Balloch Farmhouse			56°42′22″N 3°04′03″W		C(S)	13776	Upload Photo
Prosen Bridge Over Prosen Water			56°42′55″N 2°59′24″W		B	11664	Upload another image
Kinnordy - East Lodge			56°40′44″N 3°00′59″W		C(S)	11678	Upload Photo
Causewayend Cottages Now Kinnordy Estate Office			56°41′10″N 3°01′31″W		B	11681	Upload Photo
Ballinshoe Castle			56°40′00″N 2°57′10″W		B	11683	Upload Photo
Ballindarg - Walled Garden			56°38′57″N 2°58′12″W		B	11691	Upload Photo
Ballindarg Bridge Over Gairie Burn			56°38′54″N 2°58′12″W		B	11694	Upload another image
Wash-House The Tenements Brechin Road			56°40′27″N 3°00′06″W		B	36896	Upload Photo
Auld Licht Manse. 16 Brechin Road			56°40′32″N 3°00′06″W		B	36898	Upload Photo
St. Andrew's Church Hall Glamis Road			56°40′11″N 3°00′13″W		C(S)	36908	Upload Photo
8, 10 Glamis Road			56°40′11″N 3°00′11″W		B	36910	Upload Photo
12 Glamis Road			56°40′10″N 3°00′12″W		C(S)	36913	Upload Photo
1, 2 High Street			56°40′25″N 3°00′19″W		C(S)	36813	Upload Photo
43, 44 High Street (Front Building Only)			56°40′23″N 3°00′17″W		C(S)	36825	Upload Photo
45-47 High Street, British Linen Bank			56°40′24″N 3°00′18″W		B	36826	Upload Photo
Gairie House, 25 Kirk Wynd			56°40′21″N 3°00′09″W		C(S)	36832	Upload Photo
16 Kirk Wynd			56°40′22″N 3°00′13″W		C(S)	36835	Upload Photo
1, 3 Roods			56°40′25″N 3°00′17″W		C(S)	36864	Upload Photo
9, 11 Roods			56°40′25″N 3°00′16″W		C(S)	36865	Upload Photo
23-29 Roods			56°40′27″N 3°00′17″W		C(S)	36868	Upload Photo
1, 3, 5 Glengate			56°40′24″N 3°00′19″W		C(S)	36872	Upload Photo
Inverquharity Mill			56°42′31″N 2°57′25″W		B	11666	Upload Photo
Kinnordy Road, Glenhill			56°40′41″N 3°00′51″W		B	45914	Upload Photo
Braehead House, 1-5 Tannage Brae			56°40′24″N 3°00′23″W		C(S)	36889	Upload Photo
12, 14 St. Malcolm's Wynd			56°40′25″N 3°00′21″W		C(S)	36892	Upload Photo
Brechin Road, Lisden Including Gatepiers To West			56°40′36″N 2°59′33″W		B	36894	Upload Photo
St. Mary's Episcopal Church, West Hillbank			56°40′37″N 3°00′29″W		A	36899	Upload Photo
Newton Hotel, 51 Glamis Road			56°40′04″N 3°00′17″W		C(S)	36915	Upload another image
3, 4, 5 High Street			56°40′25″N 3°00′18″W		B	36814	Upload Photo
16, 17, 18 High Street			56°40′24″N 3°00′16″W		C(S)	36818	Upload Photo
28 High Street			56°40′22″N 3°00′14″W		C(S)	36821	Upload Photo
Grant's Pend, 6, Off Kirk Wynd			56°40′21″N 3°00′13″W		C(S)	36830	Upload Photo
14 Kirk Wynd			56°40′22″N 3°00′13″W		C(S)	36834	Upload Photo
18-22 Kirk Wynd			56°40′22″N 3°00′12″W		C(S)	36836	Upload Photo
6 Bellie's Brae			56°40′21″N 3°00′15″W		C(S)	36840	Upload Photo
1 William Street			56°40′20″N 3°00′16″W		C(S)	36846	Upload Photo
Carroch Mill Bridge Over Carity Burn			56°42′32″N 3°02′25″W		C(S)	11661	Upload Photo
Inverquharity Bridge Over Carity Burn			56°42′39″N 2°58′47″W		C(S)	11663	Upload Photo
Kinnordy - Museum And Observatory			56°41′00″N 3°01′50″W		B	11674	Upload Photo
St. Ninian's Chapel Burial Ground (On Fletcherfield Farm)			56°39′20″N 2°57′17″W		B	11695	Upload Photo
2, 2A, 3, 3A Church Lane, Off Glengate			56°40′25″N 3°00′25″W		C(S)	36887	Upload Photo
Barrie Pavilion, Hill Of Kirriemuir			56°40′46″N 3°00′01″W		C(S)	36903	Upload Photo
St. Andrew's Church, Glamis Road			56°40′10″N 3°00′11″W		C(S)	36912	Upload Photo
Kirriemuir Barony Parish Churchyard, High Street And Bank Street			56°40′23″N 3°00′10″W		C(S)	36811	Upload Photo
39, 40 High Street			56°40′23″N 3°00′17″W		C(S)	36823	Upload Photo
25, 27 Bellie's Brae			56°40′19″N 3°00′16″W		C(S)	36843	Upload Photo
13-17 Roods			56°40′26″N 3°00′17″W		C(S)	36866	Upload Photo
Carroch Mill Cottage			56°42′31″N 3°02′21″W		C(S)	11662	Upload Photo
Kinnordy - Walled Garden			56°41′01″N 3°01′54″W		B	11673	Upload Photo
Kinnordy - Sundial			56°40′59″N 3°01′53″W		B	11675	Upload Photo
Kinnordy - The Bell Gate			56°41′00″N 3°01′58″W		B	11676	Upload Photo
Logie - Mausoleum Enclosing Walls			56°39′22″N 2°59′23″W		B	11685	Upload Photo
Logie - Stables			56°39′25″N 2°59′34″W		B	11688	Upload Photo
North Mains Of Ballindarg Or Cairn O-Mhor			56°39′00″N 2°58′11″W		B	11693	Upload Photo
6-10 Glengate			56°40′24″N 3°00′19″W		C(S)	36877	Upload Photo
22-26 Glengate			56°40′24″N 3°00′21″W		C(S)	36880	Upload Photo
9, 11 The Tenements Brechin Road			56°40′27″N 3°00′06″W		B	36895	Upload another image See more images
Anglepark, Hillroad			56°40′59″N 3°00′29″W		C(S)	36902	Upload Photo
9, 10 High Street			56°40′24″N 3°00′16″W		C(S)	36816	Upload Photo
41, 42 High Street			56°40′23″N 3°00′17″W		C(S)	36824	Upload Photo
Grant's Pend, 1-3 Off Kirk Wynd			56°40′21″N 3°00′14″W		C(S)	36829	Upload Photo
10 Kirk Wynd			56°40′22″N 3°00′14″W		C(S)	36833	Upload Photo
26, 27 Kirk Wynd			56°40′22″N 3°00′11″W		C(S)	36838	Upload Photo
15, 17 Bellie's Brae			56°40′19″N 3°00′17″W		C(S)	36842	Upload Photo
2-8 Bank Street			56°40′23″N 3°00′13″W		C(S)	36848	Upload Photo
36-40 Bank Street			56°40′23″N 3°00′09″W		C(S)	36851	Upload Photo
Union Hotel, Bank Street			56°40′24″N 3°00′14″W		C(S)	36854	Upload Photo
Kinnordy House			56°40′59″N 3°02′05″W		B	13777	Upload another image See more images
Ballindarg - North Entrance Gates			56°38′58″N 2°58′08″W		B	13779	Upload Photo
Logie - Mausoleum			56°39′22″N 2°59′23″W		B	11684	Upload Photo
Cottages North Of "Sintra", Roundy-Hill			56°38′17″N 3°00′59″W		C(S)	11687	Upload Photo
Ballindarg - Garden Ornament			56°38′56″N 2°58′13″W		B	11692	Upload Photo

== Key ==
The scheme for classifying buildings in Scotland is:

- Category A: "buildings of national or international importance, either architectural or historic; or fine, little-altered examples of some particular period, style or building type."
- Category B: "buildings of regional or more than local importance; or major examples of some particular period, style or building type, which may have been altered."
- Category C: "buildings of local importance; lesser examples of any period, style, or building type, as originally constructed or moderately altered; and simple traditional buildings which group well with other listed buildings."

In March 2016 there were 47,288 listed buildings in Scotland. Of these, 8% were Category A, and 50% were Category B, with the remaining 42% being Category C.

== See also ==
- List of listed buildings in Angus
