= List of listed buildings in Cortachy And Clova, Angus =

This is a list of listed buildings in the parish of Cortachy and Clova in Angus, Scotland.

== List ==
Name	Location	Date Listed	Grid Ref. (Note: Sometimes known as OSGB36, the grid reference (where provided) is based on the British national grid reference system used by the Ordnance Survey. • "Guide to National Grid". Ordnance Survey. • "Get-a-map". Ordnance Survey.)	Geo-coordinates	Notes	LB Number (Note: Historic Environment Scotland assign a unique alphanumeric identifier to each designated site in Scotland, for listed buildings this always begins with "LB", for example "LB12345".)	Image
Gella Bridge Over River South Esk				56°46′30″N 3°01′41″W	Category B	4807	Upload another image
Pitcarity Bridge Over Burn Of Inchmill				56°46′44″N 3°06′03″W	Category B	4814	Upload Photo
Balnaboth - Dairy-House				56°47′20″N 3°07′25″W	Category B	4819	Upload Photo
Glen Clova, Inchdowrie House With Sunken Garden				56°50′16″N 3°04′49″W	Category C(S)	50702	Upload Photo
Glendoll Lodge With Squash Court				56°52′22″N 3°11′06″W	Category C(S)	50706	Upload Photo
Braeminzion Farmhouse				56°47′22″N 3°02′24″W	Category B	4781	Upload Photo
Clova, Gallows Knowe Bridge Over River South Esk				56°50′30″N 3°06′24″W	Category C(S)	4791	Upload another image
Clova, Bridge Over Corrie Burn				56°50′39″N 3°06′17″W	Category C(S)	4792	Upload Photo
Glenprosen Parish Kirk, Pitcarity				56°46′42″N 3°06′03″W	Category B	4811	Upload another image
Old Parish Kirk Manse, Pitcarity				56°46′42″N 3°06′01″W	Category B	4813	Upload Photo
Balnaboth - Lodge				56°46′49″N 3°06′11″W	Category B	4823	Upload Photo
Cortachy - Dairy-House				56°43′22″N 2°58′58″W	Category B	4833	Upload Photo
Cortachy - Old Butler's House				56°43′17″N 2°58′55″W	Category C(S)	4835	Upload Photo
Cortachy - The Red Lodge				56°43′15″N 2°59′26″W	Category C(S)	4799	Upload Photo
Cortachy Parish Kirk Manse				56°43′25″N 3°00′07″W	Category C(S)	4802	Upload Photo
Middlehill Cottar - House. (Owned By Middlehill Farm)				56°45′22″N 3°00′57″W	Category C(S)	4806	Upload Photo
Lednethie Bridge Over Burn Of Lednethie				56°45′07″N 3°04′44″W	Category C(S)	4809	Upload another image See more images
Balnaboth House				56°47′19″N 3°07′24″W	Category B	4817	Upload Photo
Balnaboth - Dry Bridge				56°47′15″N 3°07′15″W	Category C(S)	4820	Upload Photo
"Lacket Cottage" Cortachy				56°43′31″N 2°59′27″W	Category C(S)	4829	Upload Photo
Cortachy - "The Golden Gates"				56°43′30″N 2°59′25″W	Category B	4797	Upload Photo
Cortachy - Red Lodge Gates				56°43′14″N 2°59′27″W	Category C(S)	4800	Upload Photo
Cortachy - Gertrude Cottage				56°43′14″N 2°59′36″W	Category C(S)	4801	Upload Photo
Muirskeith Farmhouse				56°43′20″N 3°00′22″W	Category C(S)	4803	Upload Photo
"Burnside Cottage", Pitcarity				56°46′43″N 3°06′05″W	Category B	4815	Upload Photo
Balnaboth - Sundial				56°47′13″N 3°07′30″W	Category B	4821	Upload Photo
Kirkyard Walls				56°43′30″N 2°59′20″W	Category B	4825	Upload Photo
Cortachy Village Hall, West Mill				56°43′32″N 2°59′25″W	Category C(S)	4828	Upload Photo
Cortachy Castle				56°43′25″N 2°59′06″W	Category B	4831	Upload another image
Glen Prosen Village, K6 Telephone Kiosk				56°46′46″N 3°06′08″W	Category B	6470	Upload Photo
Braeminzion Steading				56°47′22″N 3°02′27″W	Category B	4782	Upload Photo
Clova, Kirkton Cottage				56°50′39″N 3°06′22″W	Category C(S)	4795	Upload Photo
Memorial Fountain Glackburn				56°43′58″N 3°01′44″W	Category C(S)	4805	Upload Photo
Balnaboth - Steading				56°47′19″N 3°07′17″W	Category C(S)	4818	Upload Photo
Balnaboth - Chapel				56°47′16″N 3°06′57″W	Category B	4822	Upload another image
Cortachy Bridge Over River South Esk				56°43′33″N 2°59′22″W	Category B	4827	Upload Photo
Spott Bridge Over Prosen Water				56°46′27″N 3°05′53″W	Category B	109	Upload another image
Clachnabrain Farmhouse				56°46′57″N 3°01′35″W	Category C(S)	4780	Upload Photo
Braeminzion School Bridge Over River South Esk				56°47′25″N 3°02′31″W	Category B	4784	Upload Photo
Glen Clova, Newbigging				56°49′46″N 3°04′30″W	Category C(S)	4787	Upload Photo
Airlie Memorial Tower, Tulloch Hill				56°44′22″N 3°01′29″W	Category B	4804	Upload another image See more images
Spott Farmhouse				56°46′28″N 3°05′48″W	Category C(S)	4810	Upload Photo
Inchmill Cottage Pitcarity				56°46′46″N 3°06′07″W	Category C(S)	4816	Upload Photo
Braeminzion School, Now "Wateresk House" (Glen)				56°47′23″N 3°02′36″W	Category B	4783	Upload Photo
Rottal Bridge Over Rottal Burn				56°48′37″N 3°02′01″W	Category C(S)	4785	Upload Photo
Rottal Lodge				56°48′52″N 3°01′43″W	Category C(S)	4786	Upload Photo
Clova Parish Church With Churchyard (Former Church Of Scotland)				56°50′37″N 3°06′18″W	Category C(S)	4788	Upload another image See more images
Clova, Old Mill				56°50′40″N 3°06′18″W	Category C(S)	4793	Upload another image See more images
Buckhood Bridge Over Burn Of Glencally				56°45′33″N 3°03′37″W	Category C(S)	4808	Upload another image See more images
Cortachy Castle - The Grey Lodge				56°43′32″N 2°59′23″W	Category B	4826	Upload another image
Cortachy - River Cottage				56°43′23″N 2°58′52″W	Category C(S)	4834	Upload Photo
Clova, Brandyburn House (Former Manse)				56°43′27″N 2°59′26″W	Category C(S)	4790	Upload another image
Cortachy - Airlie Lodge				56°42′55″N 2°59′00″W	Category B	4798	Upload Photo
Glenprosen Kirkyard				56°46′41″N 3°06′04″W	Category B	4812	Upload Photo
Cortachy Parish Kirk				56°43′31″N 2°59′22″W	Category B	4824	Upload another image
Cortachy War Memorial				56°43′23″N 2°59′42″W	Category C(S)	4830	Upload Photo
Cortachy - Stables				56°43′18″N 2°58′56″W	Category B	4832	Upload Photo

== Key ==
The scheme for classifying buildings in Scotland is:

- Category A: "buildings of national or international importance, either architectural or historic; or fine, little-altered examples of some particular period, style or building type."
- Category B: "buildings of regional or more than local importance; or major examples of some particular period, style or building type, which may have been altered."
- Category C: "buildings of local importance; lesser examples of any period, style, or building type, as originally constructed or moderately altered; and simple traditional buildings which group well with other listed buildings."

In March 2016 there were 47,288 listed buildings in Scotland. Of these, 8% were Category A, and 50% were Category B, with the remaining 42% being Category C.

== See also ==
- List of listed buildings in Angus
