= Shri Hanumagiri Kshethra =

Hill of significance to Indian folklore

Shri Hanumagiri Kshethra is situated atop a hill in the middle of Bangalore, India. It hosts an ancient Hanuman temple from which the hillock derives the name 'Hanumagiri' (hanuman is referred to as 'hanuma' and hill is named 'giri' in Kannada). Hanumagiri is located in AG's Layout, Ittamadu locality.

== Legend ==
According to Indian folklore, the hill is where the sage Mandavya undertook his 'Tapas' (meditation) and prayed for the well-being of the world. Local people hold that 'Hanumagiri' is part of Sanjeevini mountain. The hill is believed to have originated after it was "dropped" by Lord Hanuman as he was bringing it to cure Lord Ram and his brother, Lakshman, who were injured during Ramayana.

The hill hosts three temples, Shri Arkeshwara Temple, Shri Ganapathi Temple and Shri Anjaneya (Hanuman) Temple.

== Village deity ==
Lord Hanuman is the presiding deity of Hanumagiri Betta and also the village deity.

In 2017 it was alleged that government of Karnataka has given permission to construct apartments on Hanumagiri Betta.

== Activities ==
Festivals include Ram Navami, Maha Shivratri, and Hanuman Jayanti. Special Pooja (prayers) are performed on every full moon day ('Poornima') as part of daily Pooja sessions.

This hill is the centre of other activities such as celebrating International Yoga Day and a kite festival.
