= Jean Cameron =

World War II postwoman who changed dress-code

- Born: 1920 - 1981
- Occupation: postwoman
- Years active: 1940s
- Employer: General Post Office now known as Royal Mail
- Known for: changing the uniform for women postal workers to include trousers (named after her as 'Camerons')

Jean Cameron (b. 1920 – 1981), was a World War II Scottish rural postwoman who, at the age of 19, successfully challenged and changed the dress-code for postwomen to permit the wearing of trousers. The uniform trousers were known as 'Camerons' in her honour. Films were made on her successful action in 1944 and 2021. She is named in the Royal Mail 500 years archive (2017), and in the Kirriemuir town (2021) community art project, Signs of Change.

== Background ==
During World War II, women took on roles previously dominated by men, in the United Kingdom. This included serving what was then called the General Post Office, now Royal Mail. Jean Cameron, the postwoman who served in Glen Clova, a rural area, had asked to wear trousers. In 1941 she had persuaded the management that the official uniform be changed for the first time, to allow postwomen to wear a skirt or trousers. Within two months of the option being available, 500 pairs were ordered, by November 1943, 14,000 pairs of what had become known as 'Camerons' had been issued, then all 16,000 postwomen were sent a pair of the trousers.

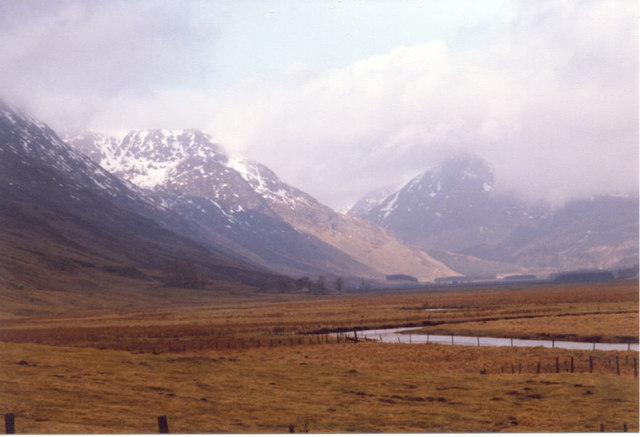
Glen Clova - general view

As Glen Clova 'postie', Cameron had a long route and tough terrain to deliver mail, shopping and urgent telegrams, either by bicycle or on foot; she had to cross burns (streams) and stone stiles, as well as walking rough rocky paths or muddy bogs.

A war-time newsreel titled 'Mail and the Female. A Highland Postie Starts a Fashion' showed postbags of trousers being delivered to all 16,000 female posties. It includes scenes of Cameron travelling through snow by bicycle, and then crossing a river on foot, in her trouser uniform. It also showed the postwomen in their 'Camerons', starting their mail round in bomb-damaged London. It included a re-enactment of a phone-call between Cameron and the District Postmaster, when he asks what skirt size she needs for her uniform, Cameron replies that she would 'prefer trousers', in Scots 'breeks'.

Another 1944 film, The Coming of the Camerons, directed by amateur, Frank M. Marshall, which told her story, was Highly commended in 1945 by the Institute of Amateur Cinematographers, and highlighted the importance of post in wartime, including a minister whose son was a prisoner of war, or remote farmers relying on the 'postie' for newspaper & shopping.

A section on Cameron's impact on women's rights was included in a 2021 BBC documentary covering the river South Esk.

== Reaction ==
When interviewed for film in 1944, Cameron said that 'thousands of posties' would be dressing like this in future. 'But I was the first, and I shouldn't be a woman if I wasn't pleased to be the first to start a fashion.'

Women wearing trousers in the 1940s was seen as controversial, although they did so in more roles, for practical reasons, as the war went on. Picture Post carried the story and joked 'it is not a question so much, 'should women wear trousers', the answer obviously being yes, but 'when, where and how'.

The design of the 'Camerons' was in line with the red and blue postal uniform and were quickly popular with female staff.

== Commemoration ==
In 2016-17, Cameron was celebrated as one of the Scots who 'helped shape the 500-year history of the Royal Mail'.

As part of a community art project in Kirriemuir, Cameron was chosen as one of the 'trailblazers' to be commemorated.

In 2021, Cameron was described in a BBC documentary as having 'revolutionised female fashion in the workplace' and having described her ideal uniform requirements for the rough route she travelled in the glen, as 'a sturdy pair of breeks'.
