= Charles Ower =

Father and son architects

Charles Ower (1813–1876) and son (1849–1921) were father and son architects, operating in eastern Scotland.

== Charles Ower the elder ==
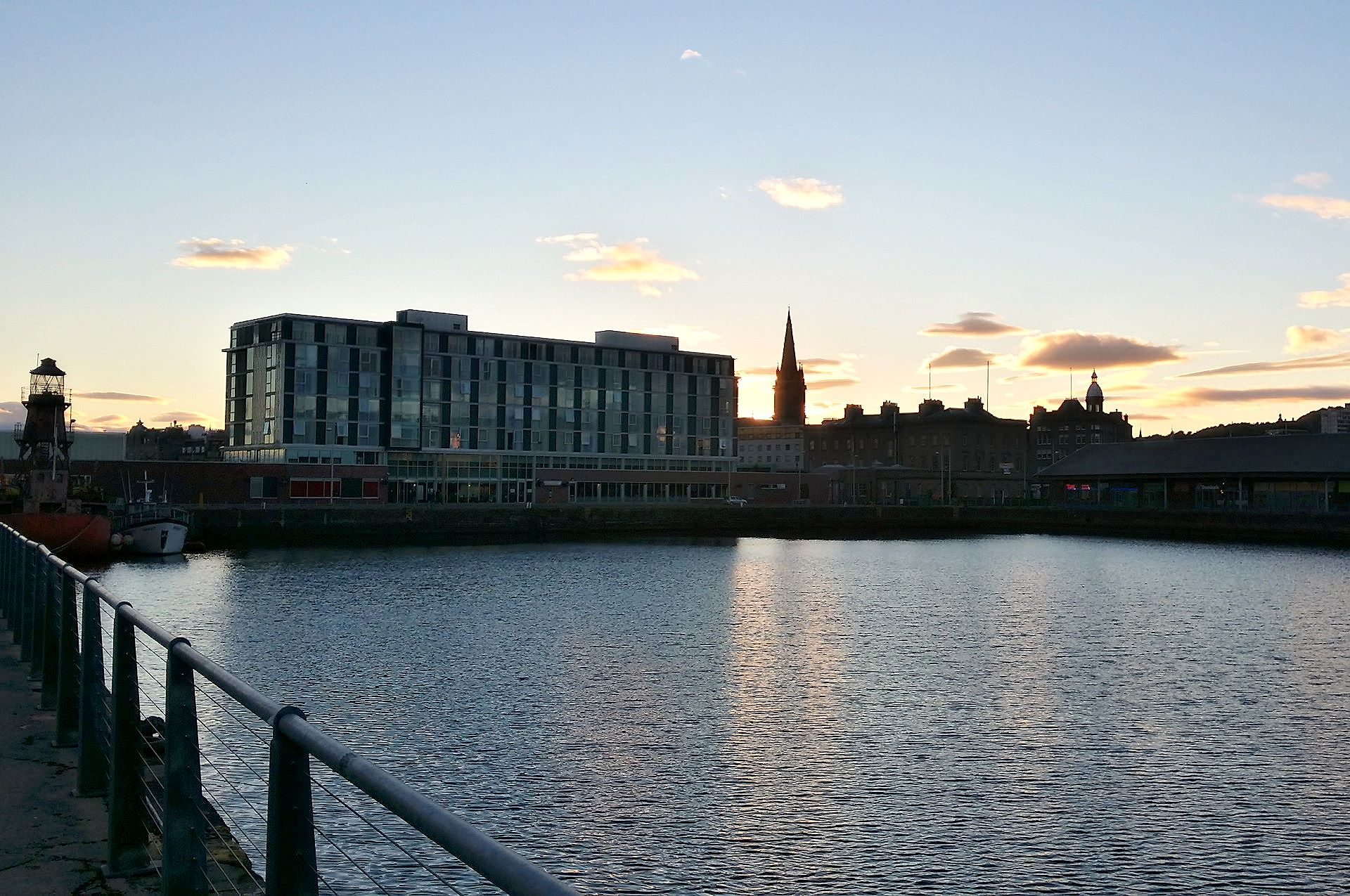
Dundee Harbour

He was born in or near Perth on 31 July 1813, the son of Thomas Ower or Owler and his wife, Jean Gregor. He trained as a civil engineer and industrial architect.

He worked as assistant to James Leslie overseeing the renewal of Dundee Harbour from 1832 to 1846.

In 1850 he designed the East Station in Dundee (originally called the Arbroath station) for the Dundee and Arbroath Railway. He later designed the Dock Street tunnel linking the Arbroath line to the Perth line. In 1857 he was responsible for the Camperdown Dock in Dundee. Other works were the floating dock gate in Alloa (1862), Victoria Dock in Dundee (1869), premises for Boase & Co (1875).

From 1846 he lived at 11 Craigie Terrace in Dundee.

He died at home, 150 Ferry Road in Dundee, on 20 September 1876.

== Charles Ower the younger ==
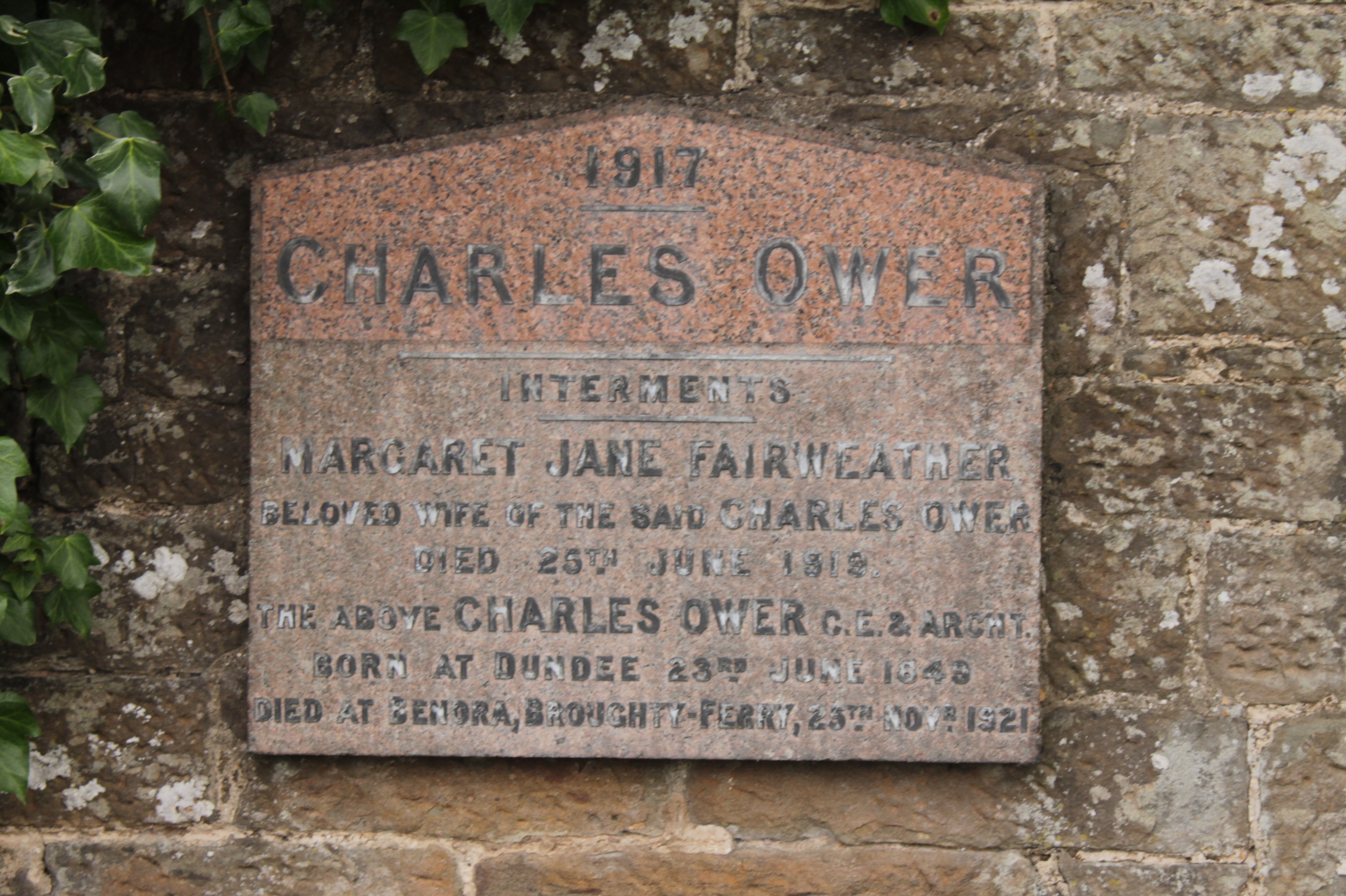
The grave of Charles Ower the younger, Western Cemetery, Dundee

He was born on 23 June 1849 the son of Charles Ower, a harbour engineer and architect, and his wife, Mary Fleet. The family lived at 103 Roodyards in Dundee.

He was educated at the High School of Dundee then articled to his father as a civil engineer in 1863. In 1869 he went to the South Kensington School of Architecture in London.

In later life he lived at "Benora", a villa in Broughty Ferry near Dundee.

He retired around 1911 and died on Christmas Day, 25 December 1921 and was buried in the Western Cemetery, Dundee. The grave lies against the western wall of the main cemetery area. The monument is small and simple.

He was married to Margaret Jane Fairweather (d.1919), daughter of James Thomson Fairweather, a Dundee tobacco merchant. They did not have any children.

His younger brother Leslie Ower (1851-1916) was also an architect and together from 1874 they created C & L Ower architects. The third brother, Stephen Ower, was a stockbroker.

== Main works ==
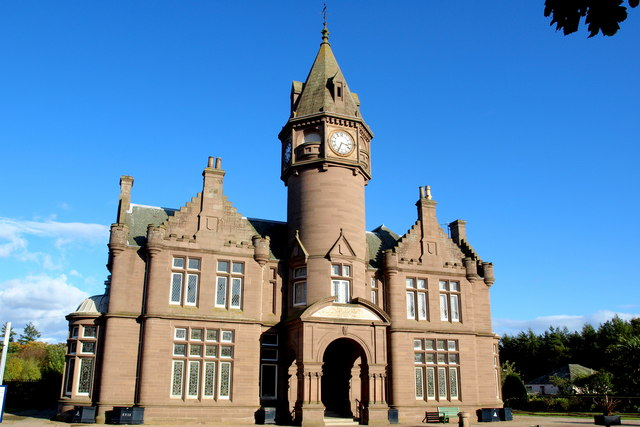
Inglis Memorial Hall, Edzell

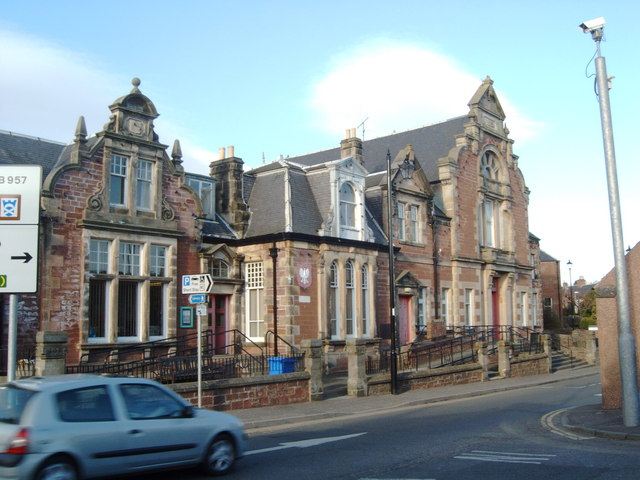
Kirriemuir Town Hall and Library

Prior to 1874 father and son mainly worked on harbour engineering projects and railway work. After 1874 Charles and Leslie Ower were a more "conventional" architectural practice, ranging from villas and tenements to jute warehouses. Their more public buildings include:

- People's Journal Office in Stirling (DNK)
- Dundee Courier offices - remodelling and extension (1872 to 1882) for William Thomson
- Ferry Station, Newport-on-Tay (1878)
- Scottish Banking Company offices, Dundee (1880)
- YMCA building, Carnoustie (1881 + 1889 extension)
- YMCA, Dundee (1881 + 1887 extension)
- Trinity United Presbyterian Church, Newport-on-Tay (1881)
- Free Church of Scotland Mission Hall and School, Hilltown of Dundee (1882)
- Ladywell Calender Works, Dundee (1882)
- Major remodelling, Balmerino Parish Church (1883)
- Dundee Harbour office (1883)
- Panmure Street Mission, Dundee (1883)
- West Church, Pitlochry (1883)
- Kirriemuir Town Hall and Library (1885)
- Balmerino parish church hall (1887)
- Downfield Free Church, Dundee (1889)
- Ardvorlich House, Comrie (1890)
- Free St Paul's Mission, Overgate, Dundee (1890)
- Inglis Memorial Hall and Library, Edzell (1896)
- Lochee Road UP Church, Dundee (1896)
- Benora, villa in Broughty Ferry for himself (1898)
- Virginia Buildings, Dundee (1903/4) for his in-laws?
- Mid Craigie Garden City, Dundee (1905)
