= List of listed buildings in Edzell, Angus =

This is a list of listed buildings in the parish of Edzell in Angus, Scotland.

== List ==
Name	Location	Date Listed	Grid Ref. (Note: Sometimes known as OSGB36, the grid reference (where provided) is based on the British national grid reference system used by the Ordnance Survey. • "Guide to National Grid". Ordnance Survey. • "Get-a-map". Ordnance Survey.)	Geo-coordinates	Notes	LB Number (Note: Historic Environment Scotland assign a unique alphanumeric identifier to each designated site in Scotland, for listed buildings this always begins with "LB", for example "LB12345".)	Image
Old Churchyard, Edzell, Lyndsay Burial Vault				56°48′29″N 2°41′07″W	Category B	11256	Upload another image See more images
Auchmull Bridge Over Burn Of Auchmull				56°51′34″N 2°40′59″W	Category B	11267	Upload Photo
Gannochy Bridge Over River North Esk				56°49′40″N 2°39′24″W	Category B	11259	Upload Photo
Doulie Cottage				56°50′40″N 2°40′23″W	Category C(S)	11266	Upload Photo
Dalhastnie Bridge Over River North Esk				56°53′50″N 2°45′11″W	Category C(S)	13745	Upload Photo
Edzell Castle				56°48′42″N 2°40′55″W	Category A	11257	Upload another image
Edzell Castle Custodian's House				56°48′43″N 2°40′48″W	Category B	11258	Upload another image
Dalhousie Lodge, Edzell				56°48′07″N 2°39′25″W	Category C(S)	11263	Upload Photo
Doulie Tower				56°50′37″N 2°40′20″W	Category B	11265	Upload Photo
95, 97 High Street				56°48′43″N 2°39′26″W	Category C(S)	11251	Upload Photo
Edzell Castle, Mains Of Edzell, Doocot				56°48′41″N 2°40′31″W	Category A	12385	Upload another image
Millden Bridge Over Burn Of Turret				56°53′57″N 2°45′21″W	Category C(S)	11247	Upload Photo
North Lodge, Church Street				56°48′42″N 2°39′30″W	Category B	11250	Upload another image
Edzell Suspension Bridge Over River North Esk				56°48′40″N 2°39′11″W	Category C(S)	11253	Upload another image See more images
Edzell J.S. School Hall (Former U.F. Church)				56°48′42″N 2°39′28″W	Category B	11254	Upload Photo
Millden Lodge				56°53′55″N 2°45′16″W	Category B	11268	Upload Photo
Edzell & Lethnot Parish Church With Walls And Gates (Originally Edzell Parish)				56°48′46″N 2°39′33″W	Category B	11249	Upload another image See more images
Dalhousie Memorial Arch, Edzell				56°48′20″N 2°39′12″W	Category B	11262	Upload another image See more images
Bridge Of Margie Over Burn Of Margie				56°49′12″N 2°42′39″W	Category C(S)	11264	Upload Photo
5 High Street				56°48′30″N 2°39′18″W	Category C(S)	11252	Upload Photo
Old Churchyard, Edzell				56°48′29″N 2°41′06″W	Category B	11255	Upload another image See more images
Loups Suspension Bridge Over River North Esk				56°50′06″N 2°39′58″W	Category B	11260	Upload another image
Edzell, Inglis Memorial Hall Including Boundary Wall				56°48′26″N 2°39′13″W	Category A	11261	Upload another image
Gannochy Pumping Station				56°49′32″N 2°40′07″W	Category B	49911	Upload Photo

== Key ==
The scheme for classifying buildings in Scotland is:

- Category A: "buildings of national or international importance, either architectural or historic; or fine, little-altered examples of some particular period, style or building type."
- Category B: "buildings of regional or more than local importance; or major examples of some particular period, style or building type, which may have been altered."
- Category C: "buildings of local importance; lesser examples of any period, style, or building type, as originally constructed or moderately altered; and simple traditional buildings which group well with other listed buildings."

In March 2016 there were 47,288 listed buildings in Scotland. Of these, 8% were Category A, and 50% were Category B, with the remaining 42% being Category C. Priestoun, With Adjoining Walls And Gates

56°32′09″N 2°59′20″W

Category B

17801

== See also ==
- List of listed buildings in Angus
