= The Ball of Kirriemuir =

Traditional Scottish song

"The Ball of Kirriemuir" (occasionally Kerrymuir and other variants), sometimes known as "The Gathering of the Clans" or "Four-and-Twenty Virgins", is a traditional song of Scottish origin. It is Roud Folk Song Index no. 4828. It consists of quatrains in which the second and fourth lines rhyme, alternating with a chorus.

The words, and the number of verses (of which there are many), vary between versions, but all are strikingly bawdy. It purports to recount the goings-on at a dance party in Kirriemuir, Angus, Scotland which turned into an orgy. In many versions, there are visitors from as far away as Aviemore and Inverness in the Scottish Highlands.

The general view is that the song originated sometime around the 1880s, and is loosely based on an actual event. The tale runs, that all the men were wearing kilts, and that few women in those days wore underwear and those that were worn had an open crotch.

Someone sprinkled rose hip seeds on the floor (from where they were caught up into the air as the dancing began), spiked the punch bowl with Spanish fly, and rigged the paraffin lamps to go out when the double effect of the itching powder and the aphrodisiac took hold.

Suggestions that some of the words can be attributed to Robert Burns (Scotland's national poet) or that T. S. Eliot made use of them have been refuted.

The following, in Scots, is representative of the less extreme verses:

'Twas on the first of August,
The party, it began,
Noo, ne'er shall I forget, me lads,
The gatherin' o' the clans.

[Chorus] Wha'll dae ye, lassie,
Wha'll dae ye noo?
The mon wha did ye last nicht,
Cannae dae ye noo.

Four and twenty virgins,
Cam doon frae Inverness,
And when the ball was over,
There were four and twenty less.

There was screwin' in the parlour,
An' screwin' on the stones,
Ye couldnae hear the music,
For the wheezin' and the groans.

And when the ball was over,
The opinion was expressed,
The music was exquisite, but
The screwin' was the best.

The earliest known recording is by Mikeen McCarthy, an Irish Traveller, from about 1938.

The song has been recorded commercially by (among others) Kenneth McKellar, Oscar Brand, Jim Croce and Aidan Moffat.

It has spread to Australia, Canada, England, Ireland, New Zealand and USA.

There is an anecdote that British troops of the Eighth Army sang it while passing in review before Winston Churchill in February 1943 at Tripoli, Libya, after their victory in the Second Battle of El Alamein; upon recognising the words, Churchill broke into a broad grin.

The 51st (Highland) Division sang it as they crossed the River Rhine in March 1945, near the end of World War II, as part of Operation Plunder; despite the Chaplain's attempts to get them to sing "Onward, Christian Soldiers" and the band's playing "Scotland the Brave".

Denis Healey, long-serving British MP and Deputy Leader of the Labour Party, could sing the song in Latin.
