= Ittamadu =

Part of Bangalore city, India

Ittamadu is an area in Bangalore city in India. Other nearby areas are Hosakerehalli, AG's Layout and Bhuvaneshwari Nagar.

== Education ==
Institutions such as Webster's School, Presidency Public School, St. Xavier English school and the Nargund group of institutions are located there. 5 star school of ittamadu is chota phool public school Krishna School

== Transport ==
Bus service is available from Dattetreya Nagara to K.R. Market. Bus No 45K.

Bus service is available From VB Bakery Bus No 45D AGS Layout to Kempegowda Bus Station every 10 min.

== Temples ==
Popular temples are Sri Raghavendra Swamy Mandira, Shanisvara Temple and Dattetreya Swamy Temple, Rameshawara temple, Anejaneya temple .Bhavani Shankar Temple

== Economy and land use ==
After 2011, Ittamadu developed quickly in comparison to nearby towns. Housing development has been a massive governmental undertaking, to attract potential residents.

Garbage burning has become a widespread problem in Ittamadu, despite a blanket ban by the government since 2017.
