= Inglis Memorial Hall =

Municipal building in Edzell, Scotland

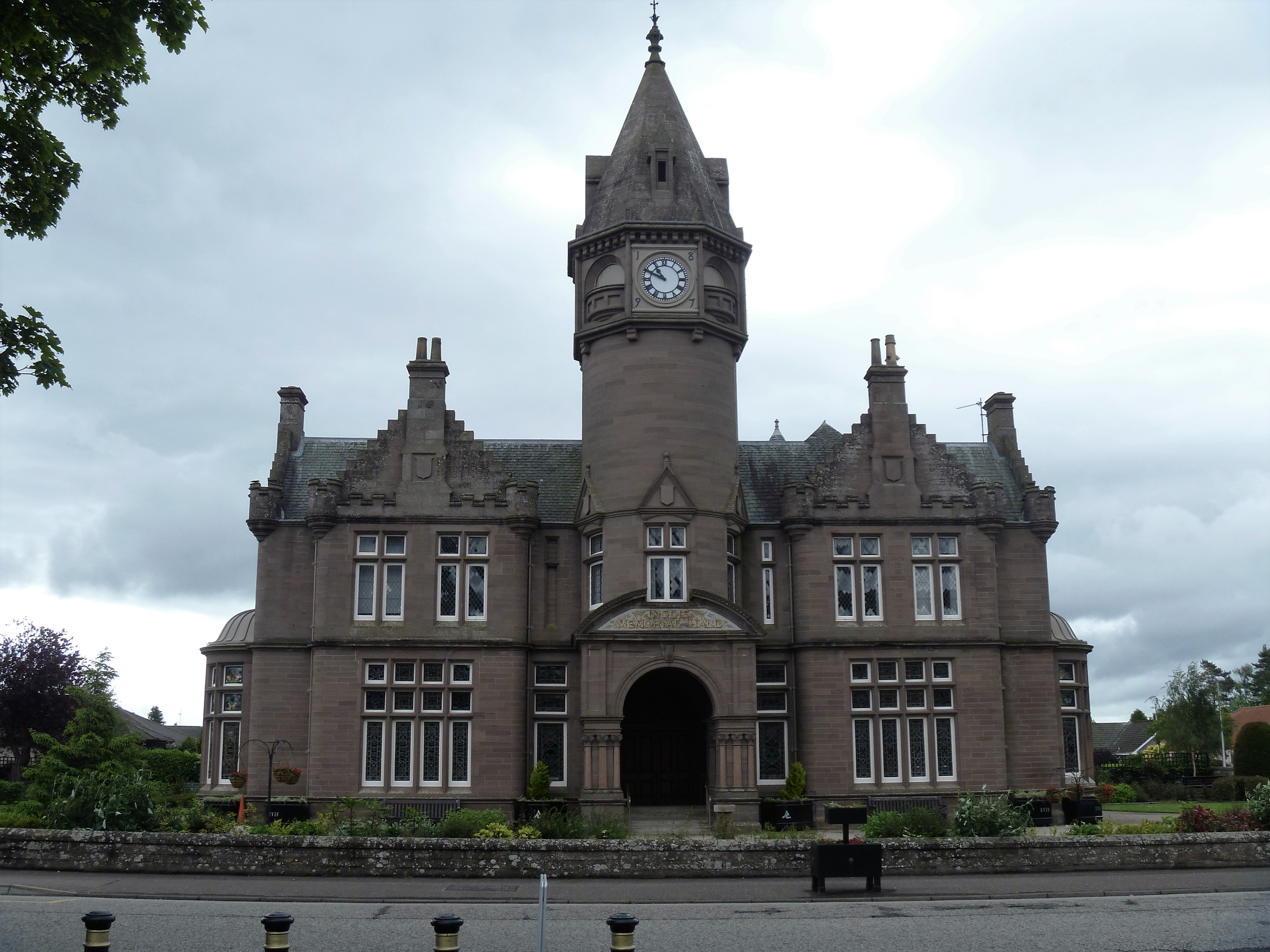
- Inglis Memorial Hall

- Shown in Angus
- 56.8072°N 2.6536°W
- Location: High Street, Edzell

History
- Built: 1898

Site notes
- Architect: Charles and Leslie Ower
- Architectural style: Gothic Revival style

Listed Building – Category A
- Official name: Edzell, Inglis Memorial Hall including boundary wall
- Designated: 15 January 1980
- Reference no.: LB11261

The Inglis Memorial Hall is a municipal structure in the High Street in Edzell, Angus, Scotland, which for much of the 20th century served as Edzell Parish Hall. The structure, which is currently used as a community events venue and accommodates a public library, is a Category A listed building.

== History ==
Although David Lindsay of Edzell, Lord Edzell had secured promotion of the area to burgh status in 1588, Edzell was a "parchment burgh", i.e. burgh in name but not in practice. Following implementation of the Local Government (Scotland) Act 1894, which established parish councils, the new parish council needed a meeting place and offices. The building was commissioned by a London stockbroker, Lieutenant-Colonel Sir Robert William Inglis (1843–1923), who had served as chairman of the London Stock Exchange, as a gift to the parish and a memorial to his parents. It was designed by Charles and Leslie Ower in the Gothic Revival style, built in sandstone and was officially opened by Inglis on 22 July 1898.

The design involved a symmetrical main frontage with five bays facing onto the High Street: the central bay featured a five-stage clock tower. The first stage was formed by a porte-cochère with Corinthian order columns and pilasters supporting an archway and a segmental open pediment containing the words "Inglis Memorial Hall" in the tympanum; the second stage, which was round, contained cross-windows with pediments and finials; the third stage, which was also round, was blind and the fourth stage, which was octagonal, contained alternating clock faces and balconies, while the final stage consisted of a spire with narrow lucarnes and a finial. The outer bays were fenestrated with mullioned and transomed windows on both floors with crenelated parapets, bartizans and stepped gables above.

Internally, the principal rooms were a library, a reading room, the parish council offices, a small assembly hall and a large assembly hall. Stained glass windows were installed by William Meikle & Sons of Glasgow in the main halls. Additionally, Inglis donated a collection of 5,000 specially bound books to fill the library.

Inglis also granted to the parish council £3,000 of loan stock in the Caledonian Railway Company for the maintenance of the building and, in his will, he left an additional £2,000 (equivalent to £104,565 in 2025) to the parish council, when he died in 1923. Following local government reorganisation in 1975, the building became the local meeting place of Inveresk Community Council. Ownership of the building passed to Angus Council at that time and, since its formation in 2015, the building has been managed by "Angus Alive", which is the culture, sport and leisure arm of Angus Council.

== See also ==
- List of listed buildings in Edzell, Angus
