= Kirriemuir Town House =

Municipal building in Kirriemuir, Scotland

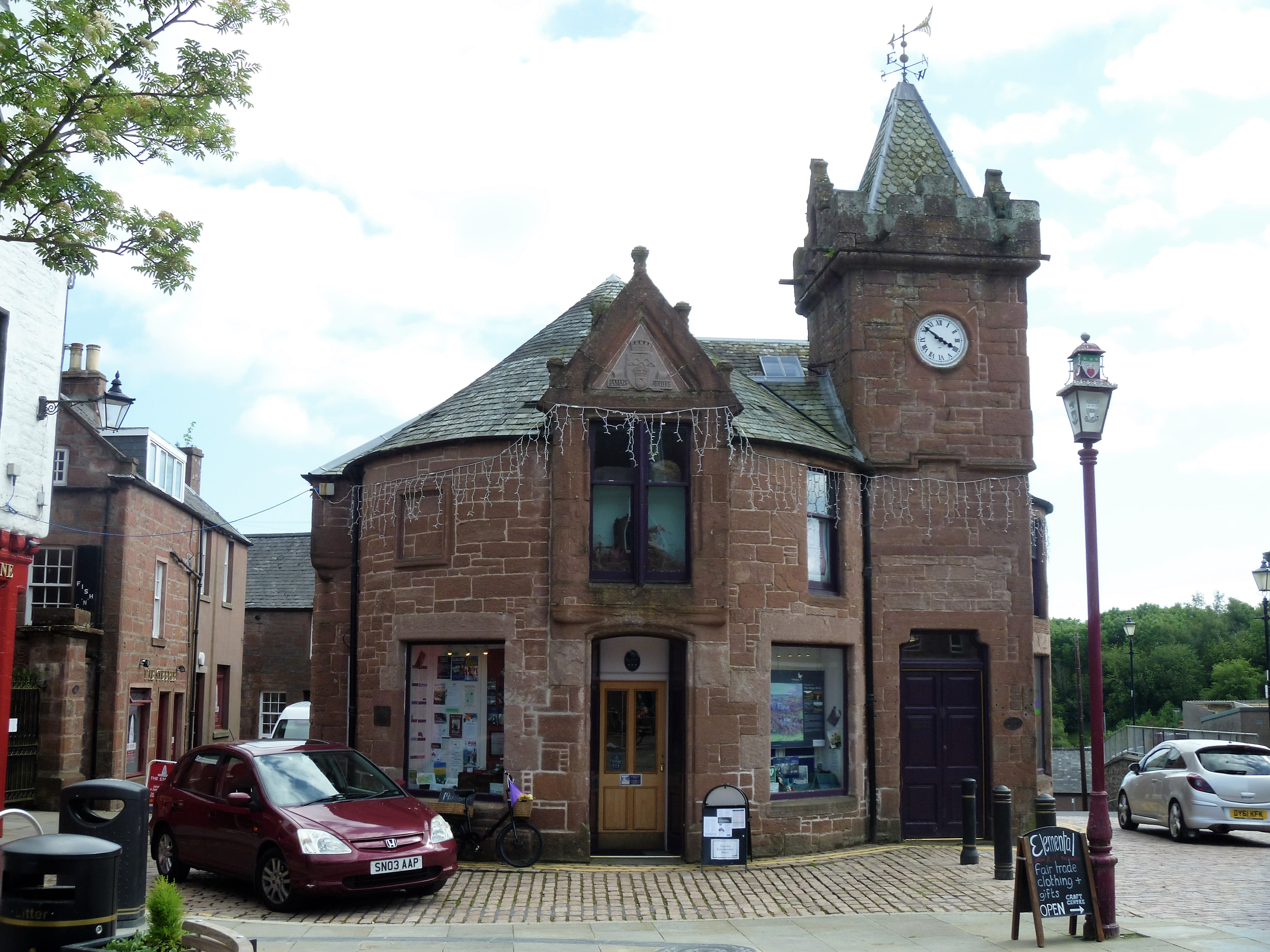
- Kirriemuir Town House

- Shown in Angus
- 56.6728°N 3.0041°W
- Location: High Street, Kirriemuir

History
- Built: 1604

Site notes
- Architectural style: Scottish medieval style

Listed Building – Category B
- Official name: Town House, 31 High Street
- Designated: 11 June 1971
- Reference no.: LB36812

Kirriemuir Town House is a municipal structure in the High Street in Kirriemuir, Angus, Scotland. The structure, which was used as a museum from 2001 to 2023, is a Category B listed building.

== History ==
The building was commissioned during the tenure of William Douglas, 10th Earl of Angus who, as chieftain and ruler of the province of Angus, owned extensive estates across the area. The building was designed in the Scottish medieval style, built in rubble masonry and was completed in 1604. It accommodated a lock-up for petty criminals on the ground floor and an assembly room for the burgh council on the first floor. The design involved a symmetrical main frontage facing north onto The Square, with an external staircase for access to the first floor in front of the middle bay. In the mid-19th century, the town house was the place to which local weavers brought their cloth for examination by government inspectors; if the cloth met the required standard, it was stamped, the duty was taken and the weaver was paid. Weavers at that time included David Barrie, father of the novelist, J. M. Barrie.

The building was repaired in 1835 and extensively remodelled by John Carver from Forfar in 1862. The remodelling involved coating the building in red sandstone, the removal of the external staircase, the construction of a clock tower and the installation of a small clock in the clock tower. Following the remodelling, the left-hand section, which was bowed, featured a segmental headed doorway in the central bay; on the first floor, there was a cross-window flanked by pilasters supporting a pediment which was decorated with finials. On the right, there was a three-stage crenelated clock tower with a doorway in the first stage, a blind panel in the second stage and clock faces in the third stage; the clock tower was surmounted by a pyramid-shaped roof and a weather vane.

In the 1880s, the burgh council decided that the town house was too small for the administration of the burgh and they relocated to a new purpose built town hall in Reform Street in 1885. In 1896, the town house was converted for retail use; it initially operated as a post office but by the early 20th century, the bowed section was operating as a chemist and the clock tower accommodated a bookseller. During the second half of the 20th century, the condition of the building deteriorated. The council acquired the building from the then owner, the former Prime Minister, Sir Alec Douglas-Home, with the intention of improving the appearance of the High Street.

In the late 20th century the building was restored and it re-opened as the Kirriemuir Gateway to the Glens Museum in 2001. Exhibits in the museum included memorabilia associated with the novelist, J. M. Barrie, the author, Violet Jacob, and the rock singer, Bon Scott, as well as an exhibition on the work of the geologist, Sir Charles Lyell. Exhibits also included a silver casket containing the scroll which was presented to J. M. Barrie when he received the Freedom of Kirriemuir on 7 June 1930.

After the managers, Angus Alive, handed the museum back to the local council, the museum closed in October 2023.

== See also ==
- List of listed buildings in Kirriemuir, Angus
