= Charles Melvin =

Scottish recipient of the Victoria Cross

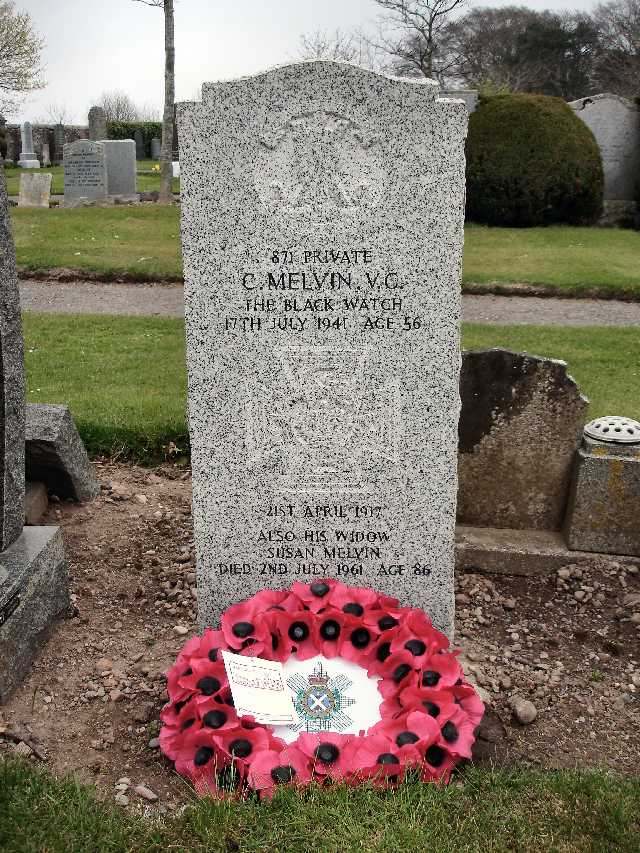
- Final resting place of Charles Melvin VC at Kirriemuir Cemetery, Angus, Scotland
- Born: 2 May 1885; Craig, Angus, Scotland
- Died: 17 July 1941 (aged 56); Kirriemuir, Angus
- Relatives: Brother of Private James Melvin (Black Watch) and Private David Melvin (Scottish Horse).
- Military career
- Allegiance: United Kingdom
- Branch: British Army
- Service years: 4 April 1907 – 15 April 1919 (12 years & 12 days)
- Rank: Private
- Nickname: Chay Melvin
- Units: 2nd Battalion, Black Watch (Royal Highlanders)
- Awards: Victoria Cross

Charles Melvin VC (2 May 1885 – 17 July 1941) was a Scottish recipient of the Victoria Cross, the highest and most prestigious award for gallantry in the face of the enemy that can be awarded to British and Commonwealth forces.

== The Medal ==
Private Melvin's citation for the award of the Victoria Cross, as published in the Supplement to the London Gazette (dated 26 November 1917), states:

No. 871 Pte. Charles Melvin, R. Highrs. (Kirriemuir) – For most conspicuous bravery, coolness and resource in action. Pte. Melvin's company had advanced to within fifty yards of the front-line trench of a redoubt, where, owing to the intensity of the enemy's fire, the men were obliged to lie down and wait for reinforcements. Pte. Melvin, however, rushed on by himself, over ground swept from end to end by rifle and machine-gun fire. On reaching the enemy trench, he halted and fired two or three shots into it, killing one or two enemy, but as the others in the trench continued to fire at him, he jumped into it, and attacked them with his bayonet in his hand, as, owing to his rifle being damaged, it was not "fixed." On being attacked in this resolute manner most of the enemy fled to their second line, but not before Pte. Melvin had killed two more and succeeded in disarming eight unwounded and one wounded. Pte. Melvin bound up the wounds of the wounded man, and then driving his eight unwounded prisoners before him, and supporting the wounded one, he hustled them out of the trench, marched them in and delivered them over to an officer. He then provided himself with a load of ammunition and returned to the firing line where he reported himself to his platoon sergeant. All this was done, not only under intense rifle and machine-gun fire, but the whole way back Pte. Melvin and his party were exposed to a very heavy artillery barrage fire. Throughout the day Pte. Melvin greatly inspired those near him with confidence and courage.

His Victoria Cross is displayed at the Black Watch Museum (Perth, Scotland). Melvin is commemorated with a plaque on Kirriemuir Town Hall, a carved flagstone in Kirriemuir's Cumberland Close, and a street called Charles Melvin Gardens, also in Kirriemuir.
