= Elizabeth Duncan Campbell =

Scottish poet and autobiographical writer (1804–1878)

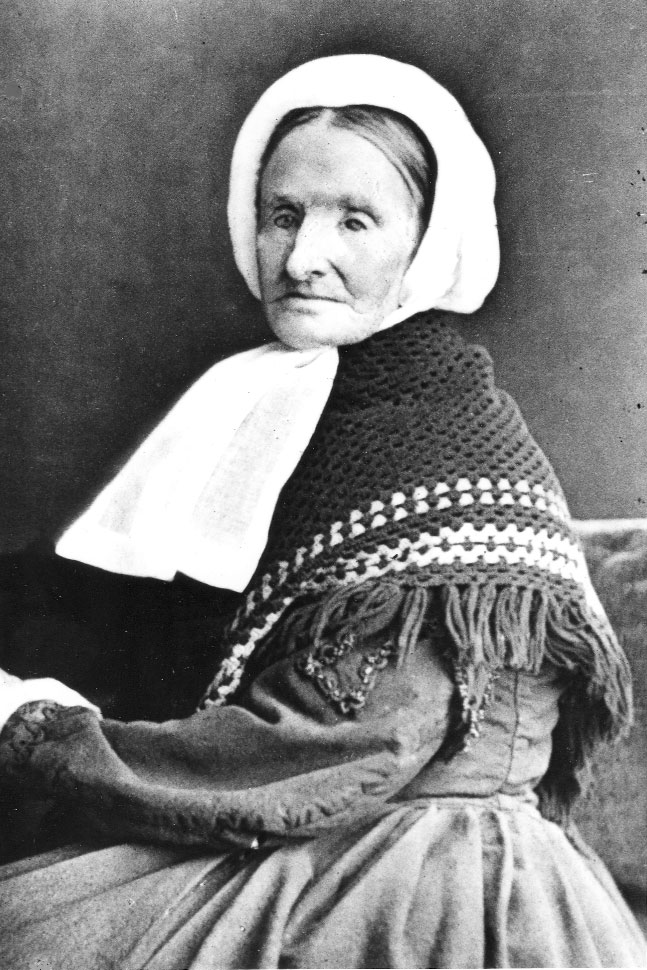
- Born: Elizabeth Duncan; 11 February 1804; Quarry Head, Edzell, Forfarshire, Scotland, U.K.
- Died: 24 December 1878 (aged 74); Lochee, Dundee, Scotland, U.K.
- Children: 8
- Writing career
- Notable work: Songs of My Pilgrimage (1875)

Elizabeth Duncan Campbell (11 February 1804 – 24 December 1878) was a Scottish working-class poet and autobiographical writer.

== Early life, education, and early career ==
Campbell was born on 11 February 1804 at Quarry Head, Edzell, Forfarshire, Scotland. She was baptized in Tannadice parish.

Her father was a ploughman and she was the fifth of six surviving daughters born to her family. Her mother died when Campbell was aged three, which she later wrote about in her poetry as her first clear memory, stating that she and her sisters "wandered like forlorn cows from morn to night."

Campbell briefly attended the village school, where she learned to read, before entering agricultural service, aged seven. She worked as a cow tender and whin gatherer and her employer's wife was physically abusive towards her.

While working as a domestic servant for the Gray family, Campbell lived in Saint Malo, France, for two years.

She spent a period working as a cook at Barry's Inn in Edinburgh, then became a millworker.

In 1832, when she was aged twenty-nine, Campbell married a flax dresser from Brechin, Forfarshire, called William Campbell. They had four sons and four daughters. Her husband died in 1873 in Arbroath, Forfarshire. She lived with her three unmarried daughters in Lochee after his death.

== Literary career ==
Campbell firstly printed her poetry without editorial help and as short leaflets for sale. Her 1875 work, Songs of My Pilgrimage, included a "commendatory preface" by Dundee minister and poet George Gilfillan and was edited by local civil servant Peter Whytock. It also included a sample of Campbell's handwriting, a photograph and an autobiographical memoir.

Campbell wrote in her poetry that her life had been "full of toil and sorrows so many and so deep that I never could tell them." Two of her sons died in infancy. Another son, called Willie, fought at Sebastopol in the Crimean War and survived, but was killed in a factory accident, when he was aged 35. She wrote of the Crimean War that:

"I think it's a pity that Kings go to war, And carry their murd'rous inventions so far, Since Adam did blunder such blunders have been, And I weep for those that’s the victims of kings."

Campbell also included abolitionist views in her poems.

== Death ==
Campbell was burned when her clothing caught fire and she died on 24 December 1878 in Lochee, Dundee, Scotland.

== Publications ==
- Burns’ Centenary, an Ode: and Other Poems (1862)
- Songs of My Pilgrimage (1875)

Her poems Willie Mill's Burn and Three Score and Ten were included in One Hundred Modern Scottish Poets (1880) by David Herschell Edwards.

== See also ==
- List of people from Dundee
- List of people from Edinburgh
- List of Scottish writers
- List of women poets
- Poetry of Scotland
