= River South Esk =

River in Angus, Scotland

South Esk
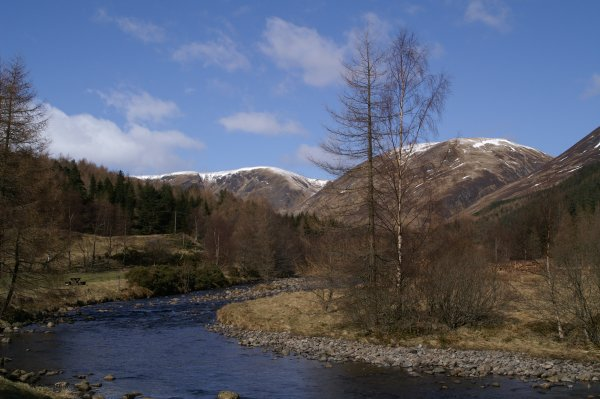
- River Esk at Glen Doll

Location
- Country: Scotland

Physical characteristics
- Source: Loch Esk
  - location: Glen Doll, Angus
  - coordinates: 56°53′55.4814″N 3°15′15.2526″W
  - elevation: 730 m (2,400 ft)
- Mouth: Montrose Basin, North Sea
  - location: Montrose, Angus, UK
  - coordinates: 56°42′10.9074″N 2°26′27.3192″W
  - elevation: 0 m (0 ft)

Basin features
- Tributaries
  - left: Burn of Fafernie, Burn of Gowal, Style Burn, Ketchie Burn, Burn of Gourrock, Moulzie Burn, Capel Burn, Cald Burn, Rottal Burn, Burn of Kinrive, Noran Water, Steinshell Burn
  - right: Burn of Altcluthie, Burn of Loupshiel, Burn of Leck, Whitewater, Burn of Gourach, Burn of Farthal, Prosen Water

Note: the southern headwater of the River Esk in Lothian is also known as the South Esk.

The South Esk (Scottish Gaelic: Easg Dheas) is a river in Angus, Scotland. It rises in the Grampian Mountains at Loch Esk in Glen Doll and flows through Glen Clova to Strathmore at Cortachy, 5 km north of Kirriemuir. Its course takes it past Brechin and enters the North Sea at Montrose.

The river gives its name to the title of Earl of Southesk, held by the Carnegie family.
