= Kirriemuir Town Hall =

Municipal building in Kirriemuir, Scotland

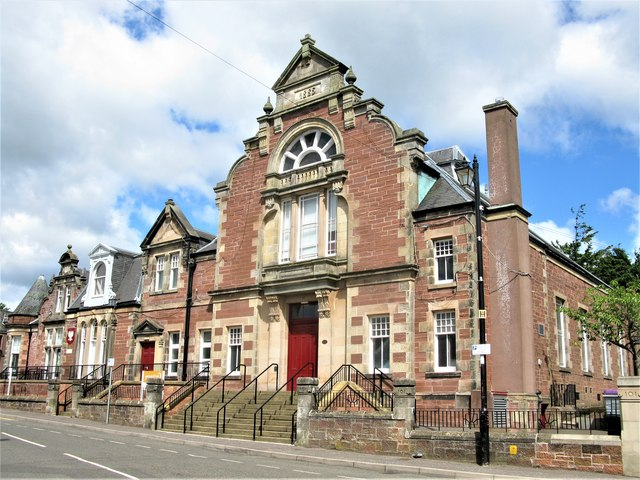
- Kirriemuir Town Hall

- Shown in Angus
- 56.6743°N 3.0029°W
- Location: Reform Street, Kirriemuir

History
- Built: 1885

Site notes
- Architect: Charles and Leslie Ower
- Architectural style: Renaissance style

Listed Building – Category C(S)
- Official name: Reform Street, Town Hall and Library
- Designated: 9 September 1987
- Reference no.: LB36916

Kirriemuir Town Hall is a municipal structure in Reform Street in Kirriemuir, Angus, Scotland. The structure, which is used as a community events venue, is a Category C listed building.

== History ==
The first municipal building in the town was the Kirriemuir Town House in the High Street which was completed in 1604. In the 1880s, the burgh council decided that the town house was too small for the administration of the burgh and they decided to commission a new building in Reform Street. The new building was designed by Charles and Leslie Ower in the Renaissance style, built in red brick with stone dressings and was completed in 1885.

The design involved a symmetrical main frontage with three bays facing onto Reform Street. There was a wide flight of steps leading up to a central doorway with a rectangular fanlight which was flanked by pairs of brackets supporting an entablature. On the first floor, there was a tri-partite window separated by pilasters supporting another entablature which was surmounted by a Diocletian window with an architrave. At roof level there was a datestone and a shaped pediment with finials. Internally, the principal room was the assembly hall with capacity to accommodate circa 370 people.

A four-bay extension to the west, intended to accommodate a public library, was designed by the same firm in a similar style and completed in 1913. There was a turret with a conical roof in the first bay on the left; the next two bays were fenestrated by tri-partite windows on the ground floor and pedimented dormer windows at attic level, while the right-hand bay contained a doorway with another pedimented dormer window above.

The locally born novelist, J. M. Barrie, attended the town hall to receive the Freedom of Kirriemuir on 7 June 1930: he was presented with a silver casket containing a scroll recording the award, and returned to the town hall to open a bazaar on 26 August 1933. A plaque presented by Polish I Corps to commemorate the hospitality they received in the local area during the early years of the Second World War was attached to the main façade of the building after the war.

The building continued to serve as the meeting place of the burgh council for much of the 20th century, but ceased to be the local seat of government when the enlarged Angus District Council was formed in 1975. The building subsequently operated mainly as a community events venue. Since the early 21st century, the town hall has been one of the venues in the town for an annual music festival for fans of the rock band, AC/DC, celebrating the life of the former lead singer, Bon Scott, who was born in the town. In April 2017, a plaque was attached to the town hall to commemorate the life of the locally born soldier, Private Charles Melvin of the 2nd Battalion, Black Watch, who was awarded the Victoria Cross for his actions during the First World War.

== See also ==
- List of listed buildings in Kirriemuir, Angus
