= Ogilvy baronets =

Baronetcy in the Baronetage of Nova Scotia

There have been three baronetcies created for members of the Ogilvy family, all in the Baronetage of Nova Scotia. As of 2008 one creation is extant while two are either extinct or dormant.

The Ogilvy Baronetcy, of Inverquharity in the County of Forfar, was created in the Baronetage of Nova Scotia on 29 September 1626 for John Ogilvy, with remainder to heirs male whatsoever. The second Baronet was a Member of the Scottish Parliament for Angus. The fifth Baronet sold the Inverquharity estate which had been in the family for fourteen generations. The ninth Baronet sat as Liberal Member of Parliament for Dundee from 1857 to 1874. The thirteenth Baronet was a deputy lieutenant of East Lothian in 1971. Two other members of the family may also be mentioned. David Ogilvy (1881–1949), great-grandson of Alexander Ogilvy, sixth son of the fifth Baronet, was a brigadier in the British Army. Frederick Charles Ashley Ogilvy (1866–1909), third son of the tenth Baronet, was a captain in the Royal Navy.

The Ogilvy Baronetcy, of Forglen in the County of Banff, was created in the Baronetage of Nova Scotia on 30 July 1627. For more information on this creation, which became either dormant or extinct in 1803, see Lord Banff.

The Ogilvy Baronetcy, of Forglen in the County of Banff, was created in the Baronetage of Nova Scotia in 1701. For more information on this creation, which became either dormant or extinct in 1803, see Lord Banff.

== Ogilvy baronets, of Inverquharity (1626) ==
- Sir John Ogilvy, 1st Baronet (died c. 1660)
- Sir David Ogilvy, 2nd Baronet (c.1630 – c. 1679)
- Sir John Ogilvy, 3rd Baronet (died c.1735)
- Sir John Ogilvy, 4th Baronet (died 1743)
- Sir John Ogilvy, 5th Baronet (1722–1802)
- Sir Walter Ogilvy, 6th Baronet (died 1808)
- Sir John Ogilvy, 7th Baronet (died 1819)
- Rear Admiral Sir William Ogilvy, 8th Baronet (c. 1765––1823)
- Sir John Ogilvy, 9th Baronet (1803–1890)
- Sir Reginald Howard Alexander Ogilvy, 10th Baronet (1832–1910)
- Sir Gilchrist Nevill Ogilvy, 11th Baronet (1892–1914)
- Sir Herbert Kinnaird Ogilvy, 12th Baronet (1865–1956)
- Sir David John Wilfrid Ogilvy, 13th Baronet (1914–1992)
- Sir Francis Gilbert Arthur Ogilvy, 14th Baronet (b. 1969)

The heir apparent is the present holder’s eldest son, Robert David Ogilvy of Inverquharity (b. 1999)

== Ogilvy baronets, of Forglen (1627) ==
- see the Lord Banff

== Ogilvy baronets, of Forglen (1701) ==
- see the Lord Banff

== See also ==
- Ogilvie baronets
- Ogilvy-Wedderburn baronets
