= Mayar (mountain) =

Mountain in the United Kingdom

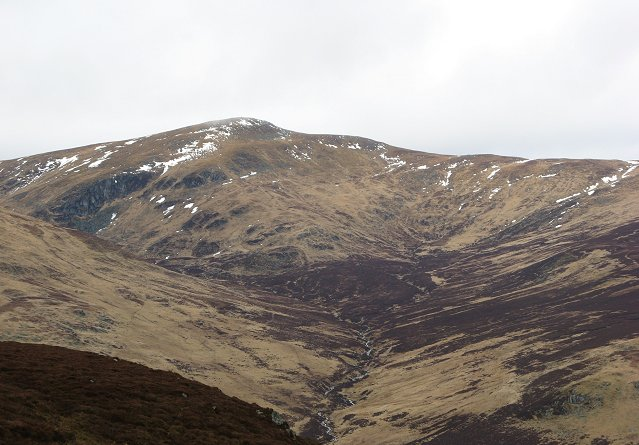
- Mayar seen from across Glen Prosen

Highest point
- Elevation: 928 m (3,045 ft)
- Prominence: 111 m (364 ft)
- Coordinates: 56°50′56″N 3°14′47″W

Geography
- Location within Scotland
- Location: Angus, Scotland

Mayar is a mountain in the Grampians, in Angus, Scotland. It is usually climbed together with its near neighbour, Driesh. At an elevation of 928 m, it is the 418th highest peak in the British Isles and the 390th tallest in Scotland.
