= Webster's High School =

Coordinates: 56.6704°N 3.0069°W

Webster’s High School

Location
- Prosen Road; Kirriemuir, Angus, DD8 5BR; Scotland

Information
- Type: Comprehensive
- Motto: Lucem Petimus; Seek the Light
- Established: 1837
- Local authority: Angus Council
- Staff: ~50
- Gender: Co-educational
- Age: 11 to 18
- Enrolment: ~650
- Houses: Prosen; Isla; Moy; Clova
- Colours: Light blue and navy
- Website: http://www.webstershigh.angus.sch.uk

Webster's High School is a secondary school in Kirriemuir, Angus, Scotland. The school has run for over 150 years, and there are over 650 pupils in the school.

The school has 4 houses; Isla, Moy, Prosen and Clova, The houses are named after Angus Glens. As well as the town of Kirriemuir, the school serves an extensive rural area which extends from Glen Isla, Glen Prosen and Glen Clova in the north, to the villages of Glamis and Glen Ogilvy in the south.

== Admissions ==
As of January 2017, there are 663 pupils and the equivalent of 53 full-time teachers. The school has 9 associated primary schools - Northmuir, Southmuir, Airlie, Cortachy, Eassie, Glamis, Isla, Newtyle, and Tannadice.

== History ==
Webster's High School is named after John Webster, a local writer and banker who bequeathed £7,000 for "erecting and maintaining a school for instructing the youth of the town and parish of Kirriemuir in the arts and sciences and such branches of education as the Trustees shall think suitable." The school was opened in 1837, occupying the building used until December 2001 by Southmuir Primary School, and was known as Webster's Seminary until 1967. After the Second World War the school moved to new premises which were themselves substantially refurbished and extended between 1988 and 1990. In December 2001 a brand new Southmuir Primary School was completed, attached to Webster's but retaining its own discrete identity. The upstairs of this building contained eight new classrooms for Webster's. In August 2009 the community's all-weather sports facility was officially opened, which enhanced the Physical Education provision. A major extension was also completed, bringing Physical Education and Home Economics together and creating on the upper level a new Art facility with a view over the town.

== Notable students ==
- Scott McKenna: Professional footballer playing Aberdeen, Nottingham Forest and Scotland, grew up in Kirriemuir and attended Websters High School.
