= Clova, Angus =

Village in Glen Clova, Angus, Scotland

Coordinates: 56.843556°N 3.104847°W

Clova: Scottish Gaelic: Clàbha
- Location within Angus
- OS grid reference: NO327730
- Council area: Angus
- Lieutenancy area: Angus
- Country: Scotland
- Sovereign state: United Kingdom
- Post town: KIRRIEMUIR
- Postcode district: DD8
- Dialling code: 01575
- Police: Scotland
- Fire: Scottish
- Ambulance: Scottish
- UK Parliament: Angus
- Scottish Parliament: Angus South

Clova is a village in Glen Clova, Angus, Scotland. It lies on the River South Esk, some 12 miles (19 km) north of Kirriemuir.

During the 1745 Jacobite Rising, Lord David Ogilvy (1725–1803) raised a regiment from local tenants; it retreated in good order from Culloden on 16 April and was disbanded at Clova on 21st.

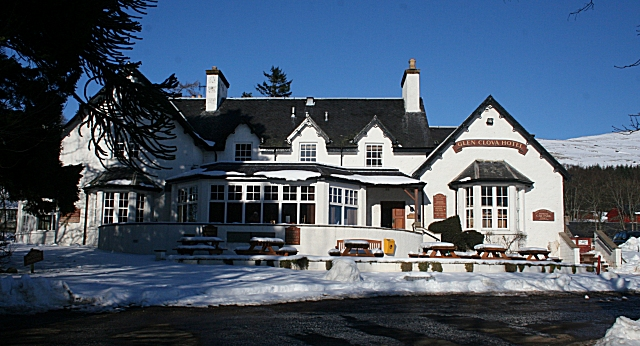
Glen Clova Hotel, Clova

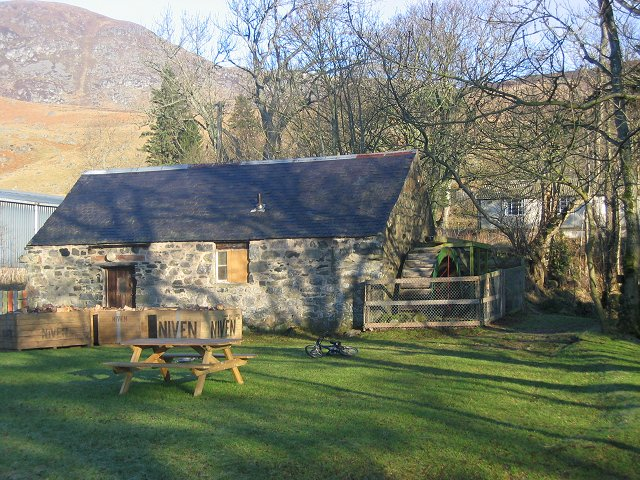
Mill, Clova
