= Driesh =

Mountain in Angus, Scotland

- Dris
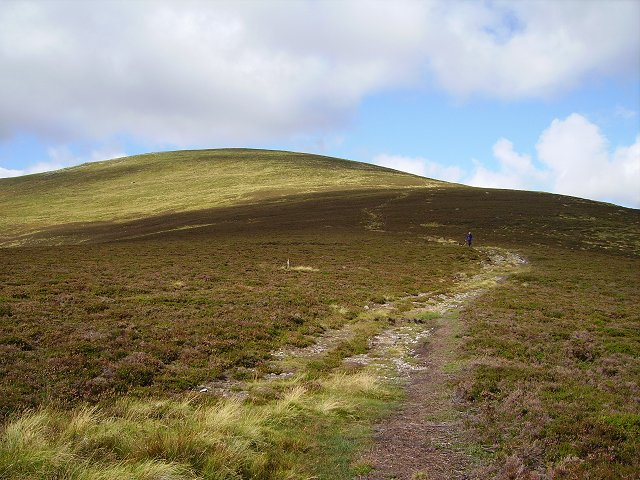
- Shank of Driesh, the south ridge of Driesh, August 2006

Highest point
- Elevation: 947 m (3,107 ft)
- Prominence: 138 m (453 ft)
- Listing: Munro
- Coordinates: 56°50′53″N 3°11′48″W

Naming
- English translation: a thorn bush or bramble
- Language of name: Gaelic

Geography
- Location within Scotland
- Location: Angus, Scotland
- Parent range: Grampians
- OS grid: NO271736
- Topo map: OS Landranger 44, Explorer 388

Driesh (Gaelic: Dris) is a mountain located in the Grampians of Scotland. Apart from Mount Keen (939 m/3,080 ft), it is the most easterly of the Munro peaks.

Located several miles north of the town of Kirriemuir in Angus, the closeness of Driesh to the city of Dundee makes it a popular Munro with locals, in many ways making it the Dundonian equivalent to Ben Lomond near Glasgow.
