= Five Glens of Angus =

Valleys in Angus, Scotland

Coordinates: 56.830°N 2.940°W

The Five Glens of Angus are the five Highland glens located in the western portion of the Angus region of Scotland. The five glens are, from west to east:

== Glen Isla ==
Drained by the River Isla.

== Glen Prosen ==
Drained by the Prosen Water.

== Glen Clova ==
Drained by the River South Esk. Glen Clova is remarkable for its glaciated landscape, with the deep trough-heads of Glen Doll (drained by the White Water, a tributary of the South Esk) and Corrie Fee, an array of classic corries (glacial cirques) along its NE rim – notably Corrie Bonhard, Corrie of Clova, Corrie Brandy and Corrie Wharrel, and a cluster of diverse "rock slope failures" (rock slides, avalanches, and deformations) including The Rives on Cairn Broadlands, and several in the corries.

Glen Clova's 1940s postwoman, Jean Cameron, changed the uniform for women, having asked to wear trousers for her rounds, they were named 'Camerons' after her.

The village of Clova is situated towards the north of the Glen.

== Glen Lethnot ==
Drained by the Water of Saughs, which becomes the 'West Water'.

== Glen Esk ==
Drained by the River North Esk. In 2015 red kites at the Gannochy estate in Glenesk were found to have been stealing swimmers' clothing to line their nest.

== See also ==
- Kilry Glen
