= Edzell =

Village in Angus, Scotland

Coordinates: 56.807198°N 2.655042°W

Edzell: Scottish Gaelic: Eigill; Scots: Aigle
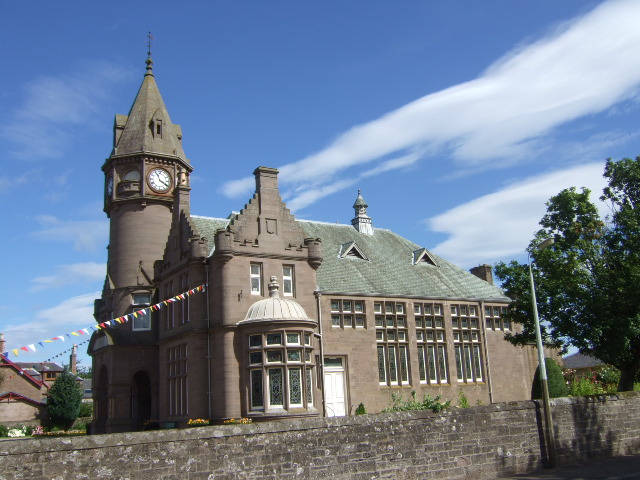
- Inglis Memorial Hall

- Location within Angus
- Population: 840 (2020)
- OS grid reference: NO601686
- Council area: Angus
- Lieutenancy area: Angus
- Country: Scotland
- Sovereign state: United Kingdom
- Post town: BRECHIN
- Postcode district: DD9
- Dialling code: 01356
- Police: Scotland
- Fire: Scottish
- Ambulance: Scottish
- UK Parliament: Angus and Perthshire Glens
- Scottish Parliament: Angus North and Mearns

Edzell (/ˈɛdzəl/; Scots: Aigle; Scottish Gaelic: Eigill) is a village in Angus, Scotland. It is five miles (eight kilometres) north of Brechin, by the River North Esk. Edzell is a Georgian-era planned town, with a broad main street and a grid system of side streets. Originally called Slateford, Edzell was renamed in 1818 after an earlier hamlet 1 1/2 miles (2.5 kilometres) to the west, which by then had been abandoned. Edzell's population in 2004 was 780.

== History ==
The original village of Edzell was located around the walls of the first Edzell Castle, a motte and bailey structure to the south of the present castle.

The existing village of Slateford was expanded in the early 19th century by the Earl of Panmure. The new parish church, replacing the one in the old village, was built in 1818 on the village's north boundary, and led to the official renaming of the village as Edzell.

In 1861, Queen Victoria and Prince Albert visited Edzell, as part of a Royal progress through Angus and Kincardineshire, just weeks before Albert's sudden death.

Edzell was not connected to the railway until 1896, and only had a passenger service until 1931, although it reopened experimentally in the summer of 1938.

It was awarded the Scotsman Trophy for the best kept Scottish village at the Britain in Bloom contest in 1975.

== Notable residents ==
- Elizabeth Duncan Campbell (1804–1878), poet and autobiographic writer, was born in the village.
- Dr Robert Pollock Gillespie FRSE (1903–1977), mathematician, retired to Edzell in 1969 and died here in 1977.
- Sir William Gammie Ogg (1891–1979), British horticultural scientist, retired here and is buried in the local churchyard.

== Description ==
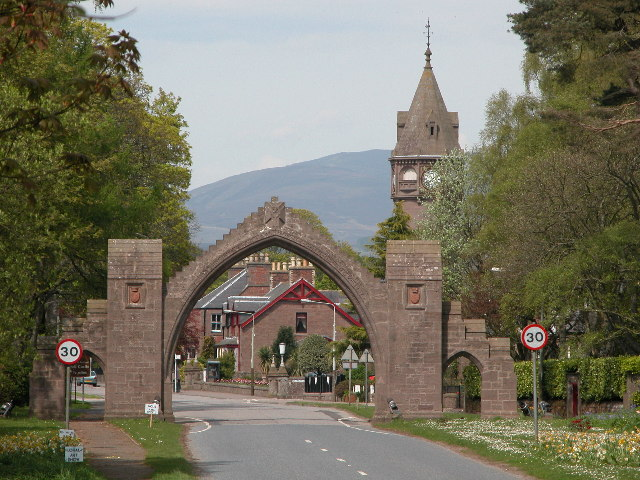
The Dalhousie Memorial Arch

The most distinctive landmark of the village is the Dalhousie Memorial Arch, which spans the main road into Edzell from the south. It was erected in 1887 to commemorate the deaths of the 13th Earl of Dalhousie and his wife, both of whom died on the same day.

Other significant buildings in the village include the Inglis Memorial Hall, a gothic building gifted to the village by Sir Robert Inglis in 1896 in memory of his father.

The Burn, a small Georgian estate, is located approximately one mile (1.5 kilometres) north of Edzell. It was originally built for Lord Adam Gordon between 1791 and 1796. It is now a charitable trust and is used for educational retreats.

The village is also known for the Rocks of Solitude walk that is accessed through a blue door by the River North Esk which runs along the village.

== RAF Edzell ==
A former Royal Air Force airfield RAF Edzell is situated four miles (six kilometres) from Edzell by road, but only one mile (1.5 kilometres) directly east, over the North Esk. It was active for over fifty years, first as an RAF station during World War II, and later on lease to the United States Navy from 1960 until its decommissioning in 1996, and final closure in 1997.

Following the closure of the base, the houses, airfield and administrative buildings were put up for sale. The married quarters (houses) were purchased by a developer and individually sold; these houses now make up the village of Edzell Woods. The airfield and administrative buildings of the base are owned by Carnegie Base Services.

== U.S. Navy "Edzell" Tartan ==
One product of the U.S. Navy presence at Edzell was the creation of a registered tartan for the U.S. Navy cryptologists of the Navy Security Group Activity (NSGA) at Edzell. The tartan design was created at by Strathmore Woolen Company at the request of Mrs. Janet Demech (wife of Edzell's commander, Captain Fred R. Demech, USN), with input from Mrs. Demech and Mrs. Pam Schaffer. The tartan was unveiled on 6 July 1985, the 25th anniversary of the U.S. Navy presence at Edzell. While the U.S. Navy site at Edzell was closed in September 1997 (after 37 years of service) the "US Navy Edzell" tartan continues to increase in (unofficial) popularity with U.S. Navy personnel, particularly members of the Cryptologic and Intelligence specialties.

== Gallery ==
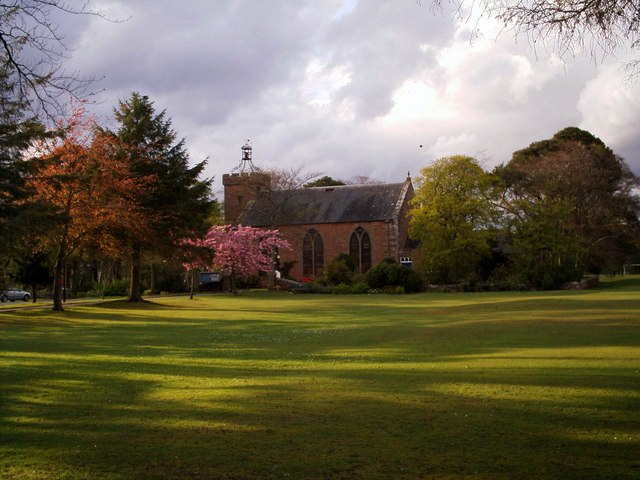
Edzell Church

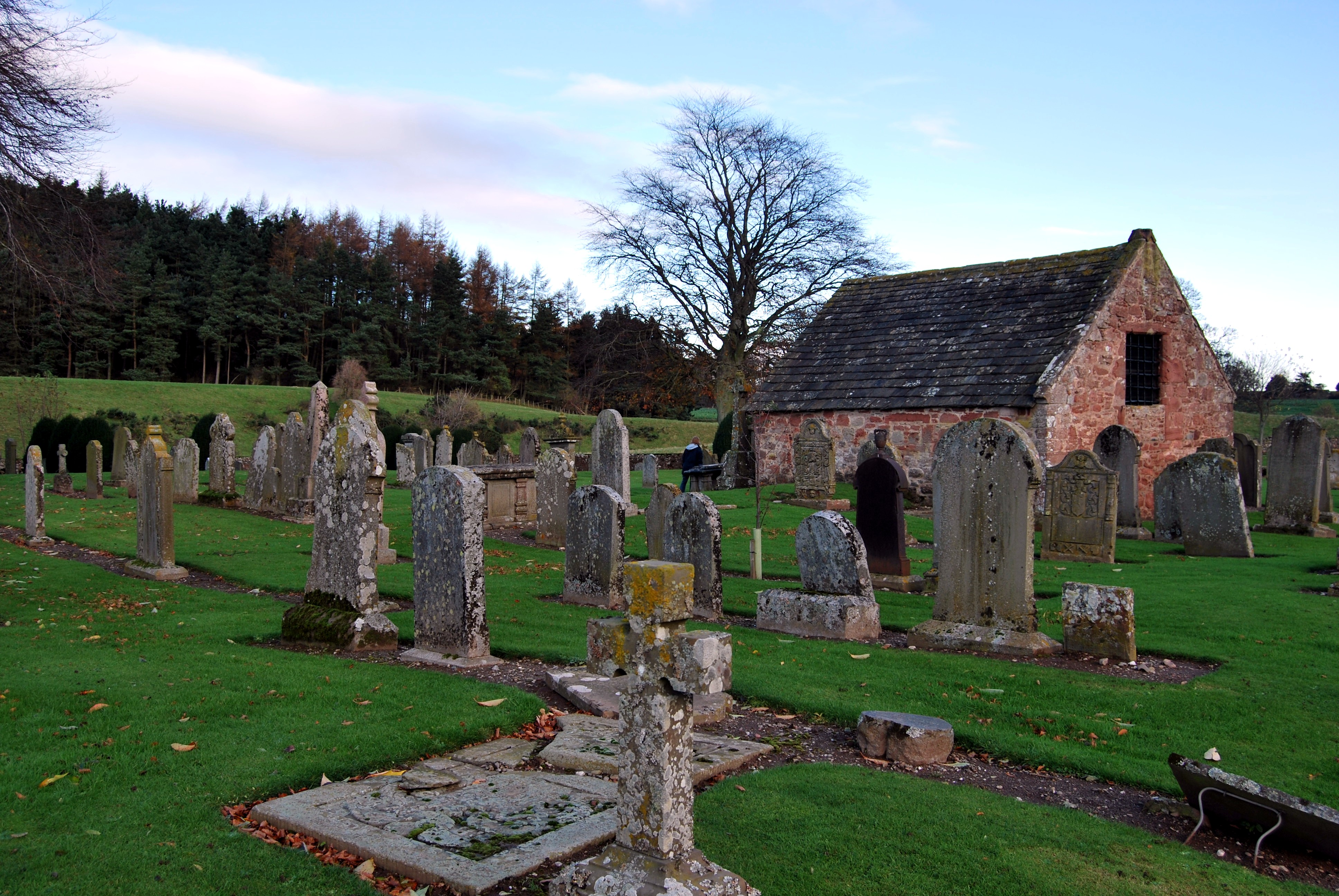
The Old Kirkyard

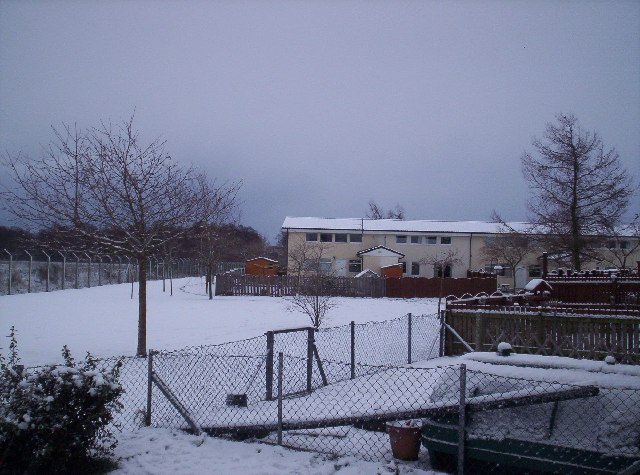
Houses at Edzell Woods
