= Kirriemuir =

Town in Angus, Scotland

Coordinates: 56.66921°N 3.00510°W

Kirriemuir: Scottish Gaelic: Ceathramh Mhoire; Scots: Kirriemuir, Kirrie
- Market town and Burgh
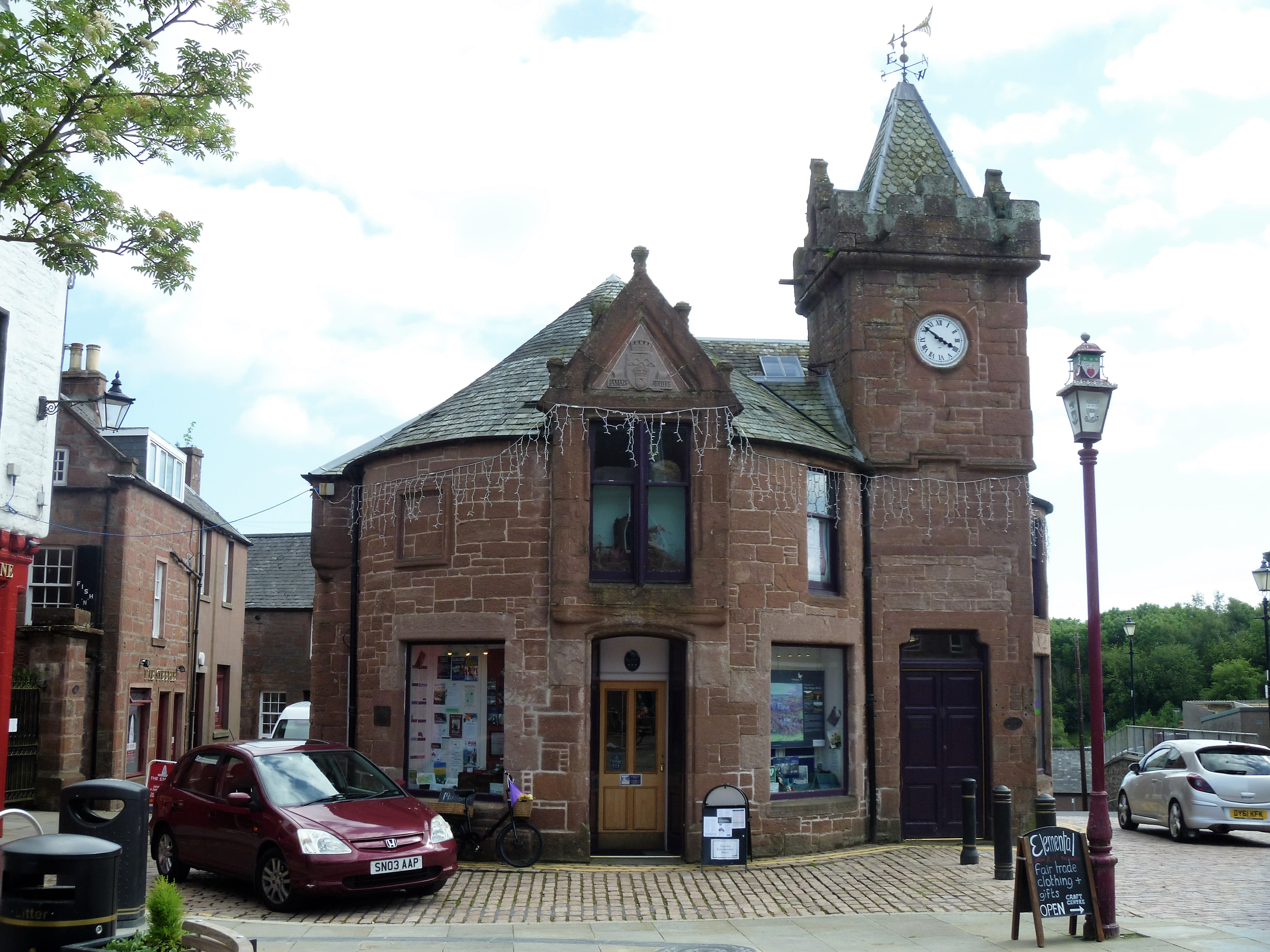
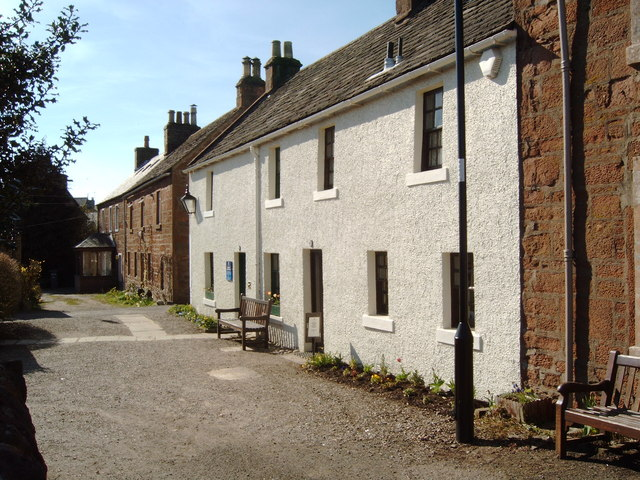
- Peter Pan Statue Town House Bon Scott statue J.M. Barrie's birthplace Airlie Monument

- Location within Angus
- Population: 6,012 (2022)
- Demonym: Kirriemarian
- OS grid reference: NO385535
- Council area: Angus
- Lieutenancy area: Angus
- Country: Scotland
- Sovereign state: United Kingdom
- Post town: KIRRIEMUIR
- Postcode district: DD8
- Dialling code: 01575
- Police: Scotland
- Fire: Scottish
- Ambulance: Scottish
- UK Parliament: Angus and Perthshire Glens
- Scottish Parliament: Angus South

Kirriemuir (/ˌkɪriˈmjʊər/ KIRR-ee-MURE, Scots: [ˌkɪreˈmeːr, -miːr]; Scottish Gaelic: Ceathramh Mhoire [ˌkʲʰɛɾə ˈvɔɾʲə]), sometimes called Kirrie or the Wee Red Toon, is a historic market town and burgh in Angus, Scotland. It is approximately 50 miles (80 km) north of Edinburgh, 73 miles (118 km) northeast of Glasgow, and 14 miles (22 km) north of Dundee. It had a population of 6,012 in 2022.

The playwright J. M. Barrie was born and buried here and a statue of Peter Pan is in the town square.

== History ==
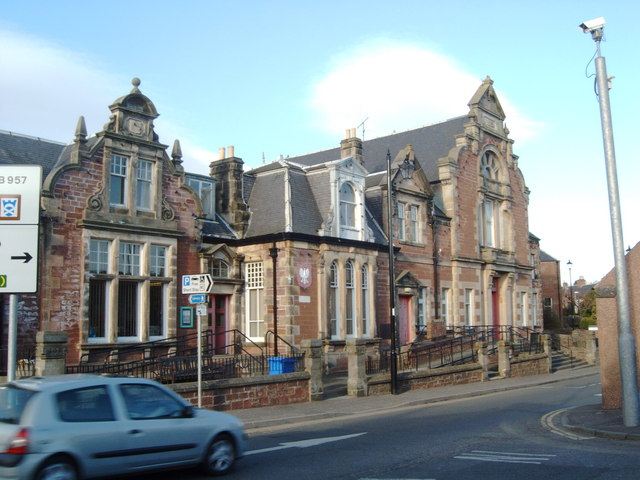
Kirriemuir Library (on the left) and Kirriemuir Town Hall (on the right)

Some of the Kirriemuir Sculptured Stones, a series of late Pictish cross slabs, are on display at the Meffan Institute in Forfar, and the others can be seen in the Kirriemuir Gateway to the Glens Museum which now occupies the Kirriemuir Town House.

The lands of Ummarchie lay in the feudal barony of Kirriemure – then in the Sheriffdom of Forfar – and were owned for centuries by the Lauder of the Bass family. Alexander Lauder of Ummarchie, Co. Forfar, born about 1504 and a younger brother of Robert Lauder of the Bass, appears in many documents and died at some time in 1580. In October of this year, his younger son Walter had murdered his father's Roman Catholic brother James in a religious dispute. Walter was found guilty at Edinburgh on 15 December and beheaded. The eldest son, another Alexander Lauder of Ummarchie, stood surety on 22 March 1600 in an Act of Caution in the Privy Council in a principal for 2000 merks for William Rynd of Kers, who was involved in violent armed feuds between the Lindsays and the Ogilvies. Alexander Lauder of Ummarchie was still living in 1608.

Kirriemuir has a history of witchcraft accusations dating back to the 16th century. A pond on the outskirts, known as the Witch Pool, was a millpond for the 19th-century Meikle Mill. Local amateur historians tend to think this referred to a "mickle" (small) mill, but the reference is to one of James or his son Andrew Meikle's mills, based on ideas picked up in the Netherlands in the 1700s. The Meikles were a family of agricultural engineers from Haddington who were held in high esteem for many generations. The adjacent "Court Hillock" was shown, during excavations for a housing development, to be no more than a spoil heap left after excavation and cleaning of the pond.

Though Kirriemuir's importance as a market town has diminished, its former jute factories (now manufacturing synthetics) recall its 19th-century importance as a centre of a home-based weaving industry.

Historic features near Kirriemuir include a carved Pictish stone known as the Eassie Stone. It was found in a burn near the village of Eassie.

Kirriemuir claims the narrowest public footpath in Western Europe; Cat's Close, situated between Grant's Pend and Kirkwynd. It is a mere 40 centimetres (15 3/4 inches) wide.

The family estate of Sir Hugh Munro, who created Munro's Tables of Scottish mountains over 3,000 feet (914.4 metres) in elevation (which are now called "munros"), is also located near the town.

Kirriemuir Gingerbread was created by the baker, Walter Burnett, around 1900, though the recipe was sold to what is now Bell's Food Group, located in Shotts, in the 1940s.

== Governance ==
Kirriemuir is represented within Angus Council by the Kirriemuir and Dean ward, from which three councillors are elected. As of 2019 these were: Julie Bell (Scottish National Party), George Meechan (Independent) and Ronnie Proctor (Scottish Conservative and Unionist). Kirriemuir Town Hall, which was the meeting place of the former burgh council, was completed in 1885.

== Culture ==
The town has three museums: the Gateway to the Glens Museum, Barrie's Birthplace, and the Tayside Police Museum. There was once a museum of aviation, whose artifacts are now in the Richard Moss Memorial Collection at the Montrose Air Station Heritage Centre. There is a camera obscura, donated by J. M. Barrie, on the hill, offering views to the south and south-west and of the higher hills to the north. Also on the hill and offering views from its southern slopes is the town cemetery, where Barrie is buried in the family grave. There is a silver granite war memorial in the centre of the cemetery, a column surmounted by a kilted soldier looking down across the town and over the broad fields of Strathmore to the Sidlaws.

The town is host to multiple music festivals:

- The AC/DC-themed festival Bonfest has been held since 2006, commemorating Bon Scott, who grew up in the town.
- On the last Saturday in August a local music team holds a music festival, Live in the Den, featuring local guitar bands. It was not held in 2011 due to flooding.
- The first weekend in September has, since 1982, been host to a Scottish traditional music festival with competitions, concerts and sessions, the Kirriemuir Festival, organised by the Traditional Music and Song Association of Scotland.

== Setting ==
Kirriemuir consists mainly of two areas: Northmuir and Southmuir. It sits looking south towards Glamis and the Sidlaws over Strathmore (one of the most fertile fruit-growing areas in Scotland). Its position at the base of the Angus glens makes it an attractive centre for hill walking on nearby Munros, and for fishing, partridge, pheasant and grouse shooting, and deer-stalking. There is also an 18-hole golf course with views north to Glen Clova and Glen Doll.

== Schools ==
Webster's High School is located in Southmuir; Northmuir and Southmuir each have a primary school. Northmuir's replaced Reform Street Primary School, which was in the town centre and demolished to build the Lyell Court Sheltered Housing complex. Southmuir's moved to new premises in 2002, which had been built as part of an extension to Webster's High School. The earlier Southmuir building (once the original Webster's Seminary) was destroyed by fire on 29 October 2006 and has since been demolished.

== Parks ==
The town's two main parks lie in the Gairie Burn glen and on top of Kirriemuir Hill.

The Den can be split into two parts. The east Den lies to the east of Bellies Brae (The Commonty) and the west Den to the west of Bellies Brae. This park has a climbing frame and swing set. The Den is prone to flooding, as it lies in a deep valley. This last happened in October 2023. In the far west Den, there is a large Den Waterfall and the Cuttle Well.

The Hill with Neverland, or the Peter Pan Play Park as it is sometimes called, is located in Northmuir. This play park with a Peter Pan theme was laid out in November 2010. Smaller parks include Davidson Park in Southmuir and Martin Park off Slade Road.

== Sport ==
Kirriemuir is home to the junior football club Kirriemuir Thistle. Although Kirriemuir lacks a senior team side, the nearest club in the Scottish Football League is Forfar Athletic in the neighbouring town, one of several Angus clubs to play in the official league system. Kirriemuir also has a wheeled sports area in Martin Park and an all-weather sports pitch at Webster's Leisure Centre adjoining Webster's High School.

In the 1880s, Lindertis F.C. from Kirriemuir played in the Scottish Cup for five seasons, and Kirriemuir F.C. for one.

== Notable people ==
- John Ogilby (also Ogelby, Oglivie) (1600–1676), born in Kirriemuir; publisher, translator, impresario and the pioneering cartographer who produced the first road map of England in 1675.
- J. M. Barrie (1860–1937), born in Kirriemuir: creator of Peter Pan and Rector of the University of St Andrews. He called this "wee red toonie" "Thrums" in his novels Auld Licht Idylls, A Window in Thrums, and The Little Minister. "Red" refers to a reddish sandstone used on older buildings in the town, which became a minor tourism destination in response to Barrie. His birthplace on the Brechin road is now a museum owned by the National Trust for Scotland. A statue of Peter Pan stands in the square.
- Violet Jacob (1863–1946), poet and novelist, returned widowed from India in 1936, went to live in Kirriemuir, and died there in 1946.
- Jean Cameron, a 1940s postwoman in Glen Clova, pressed successfully for the official dress-code to allow trousers for women delivering mail (commemorated in Kirriemuir).
- Scott McKenna (born 1996), professional footballer for Aberdeen, Nottingham Forest and Scotland, grew up in Kirriemuir and attended Webster's High School.
- David Niven, actor, claimed Kirriemuir as his birthplace, but was actually born in London.
- Bon Scott, vocalist of AC/DC, was born at the maternity hospital in nearby Forfar in 1946 and lived in Kirriemuir until 1952, when his family emigrated to Australia. A plaque to his memory stands in Cumberland Close. On 26 January 2016, town officials approved plans for a statue of Scott in the Bellies Brae car park. This was unveiled by former AC/DC bass player Mark Evans in April 2016 during the town's annual "Bonfest" event.
- Sir David Wilkie, surgeon, was born here in 1882. He befriended Barrie in 1930, when he became Chancellor of the University of Edinburgh, due to their common home town.
- Victoria Cross awardees: Captain Charles Lyell, Corporal Richard Burton, and Private Charles Melvin resided in Kirriemuir.
- Ryan Kopel (born 1997), actor and singer.

== Twin towns ==
Kirriemuir is twinned with:

- Volvic, Puy-de-Dôme, France
- Kerrimuir, Melbourne, Australia

== In popular culture ==
- "The Ball of Kirriemuir", a rude and traditional song about a dance party that ends in virgin ladies all losing their virginity.
