= Camus Cross =

Sculpture in Angus, Scotland

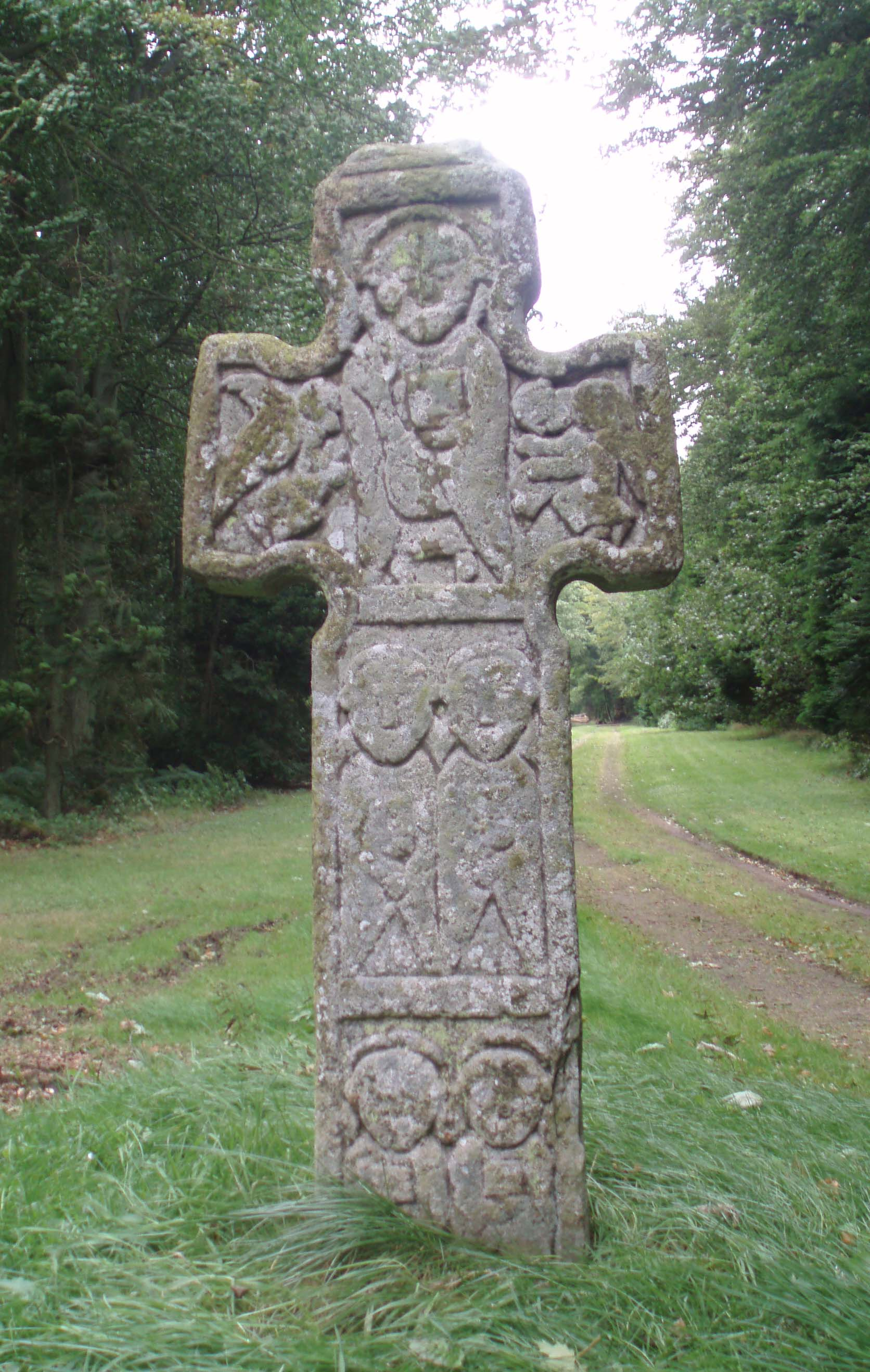
- The Camus Cross, East face
- Material: Old Red Sandstone
- Height: 2 metres (6.6 ft)
- Symbols: Christ and evangelists; Crucifixion (weathered); Centaur; Foliar designs
- Created: Tenth century CE
- Present location: Camuston Wood, near Carnoustie, Angus, Scotland
- Coordinates: 56.530647°N 2.783570°W
- Classification: Type III, freestanding cross
- Culture: Picto-Scottish

Designations

Scheduled monument
- Official name: Camus's Cross
- Type: Crosses and carved stones: cross (free-standing)
- Designated: 16 November 1923
- Reference no.: SM148

The Camus Cross, otherwise known as the Camuston or Camustane Cross, is an Early Medieval Scottish standing stone on the Panmure Estate near Carnoustie in Angus, Scotland. First recorded in the 15th century in a legal document describing the boundaries between Camuston and the barony of Downie, and described in the 17th century by Robert Maule, it is a freestanding cross, rare in Eastern Scotland.

The cross is thought to date from the 10th century, and exhibits distinctive Hiberno-Scottish mission influences, in common with several other monuments in the area. Tradition and folk etymology suggest that the cross marked the burial site of Camus, leader of the Norse army purportedly defeated by King Malcolm II at the apocryphal Battle of Barry. The name of the stone is likely to derive from the extinct village of Camuston, which has a Celtic toponymy.

== Location ==
The Camus Cross is in the Downie Hills, approximately 4 kilometres (2.5 mi) northwest of Carnoustie in Angus, Scotland. It is at the centre of a 1 kilometre (0.62 mi) long avenue leading east-north-east through Camuston Wood from the Panmure Testimonial to the Craigton to Carnoustie road, at (grid reference NO519379). The avenue is part of Panmure Estate and leads, beyond the road, to the former site of Panmure House.

== Description ==
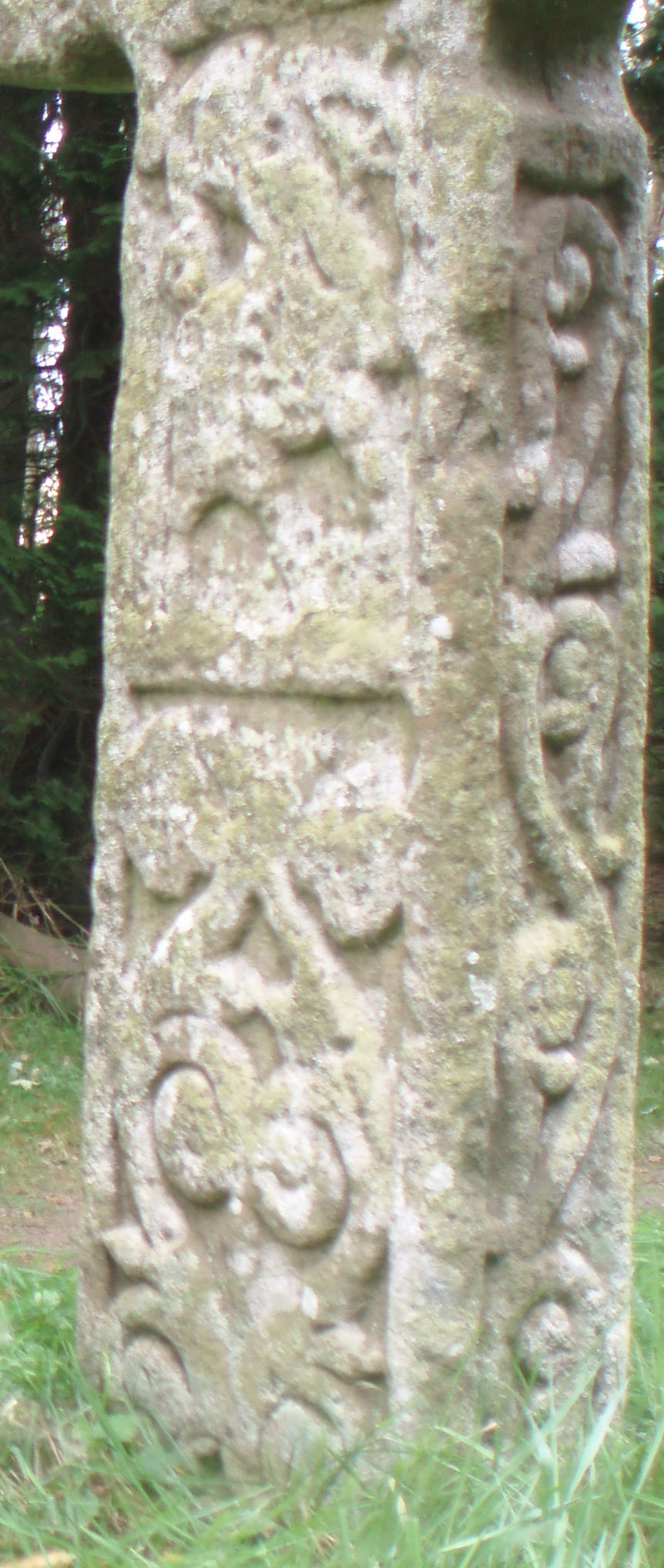
Shaft detail, showing foliar scrolls on southern edge

The freestanding cross is carved from Old Red Sandstone and stands 2 metres (6.6 ft) high, approximately 0.6 metres (2.0 ft) wide at the base, 0.8 metres (2.6 ft) wide at the arms, and approximately 0.2 metres (0.66 ft) thick. It stands on a low earth mound, 7.5 metres (25 ft) wide (east to west), 4.5 metres (15 ft) wide (north to south) and 1 metre (3.3 ft) high, in the centre of the Camuston Wood avenue, facing east to west. All faces and sides are sculpted. The cross has suffered significant weathering, most notably on the west face, which has obscured some of the designs.

The stone bears no idiomatic Pictish symbols and, under J Romilly Allen and Joseph Anderson's classification system, it is a class III stone. Intact freestanding crosses of this age are comparatively rare, perhaps because of their vulnerability to damage, and the only ones in Eastern Scotland are the Camus Cross and the Dupplin Cross in Strathearn. Fragmentary remains of other crosses include heads found at Forteviot, St Vigeans and Strathmartine and shaft fragments found at Monifieth, Abernethy, Carpow and Invermay, as well as some socketed stones where crosses once stood.

The western face is divided into three sections. The uppermost section is almost completely weathered. The antiquarian Alexander Gordon, who described the stone in 1726 in his Itinerarium Septentrionale, records this panel as holding a crucifixion scene, with the figure of a man at the right hand side and the left side completely defaced. Below this is a depiction of a centaur holding a bow, with the lowest panel having a symmetrical floral scroll design. The figures to the left and right are likely to have represented Longinus and Stephaton.

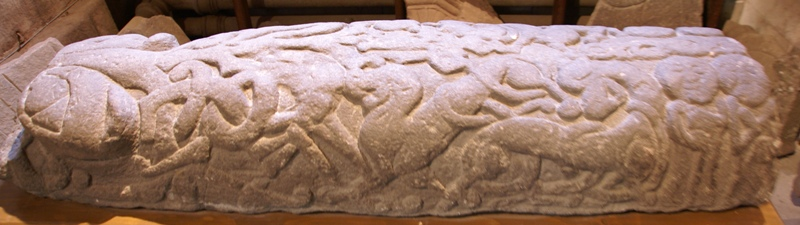
The Brechin Hogback

The eastern face is usually interpreted as a depiction of Christ flanked by angels above the four evangelists, although Robert Maule, in the earliest description of the stone, described the scene as Moses giving out the Law.

The carving on the Camus Cross shows distinct similarities with those on the Brechin Hogback stone and point to an Irish Ecclesiastical influence. The foliar designs on the north and south edges, originally seen as Ringerike-like (and hence, Scandinavian in origin), consist of tendrils and volutes with "wave-crest" thickening. These features bear closest similarity with Irish insular art of the late tenth century, and the treatment of the symmetrical foliar scroll design on the lower portion of the west face is diagnostically Irish. The full-face figures on the east face are of an identical type to those on the Brechin Hogback. In the case of the Brechin Hogback, the figures are carrying objects that are characteristic of early medieval Irish monasticism.

== History ==
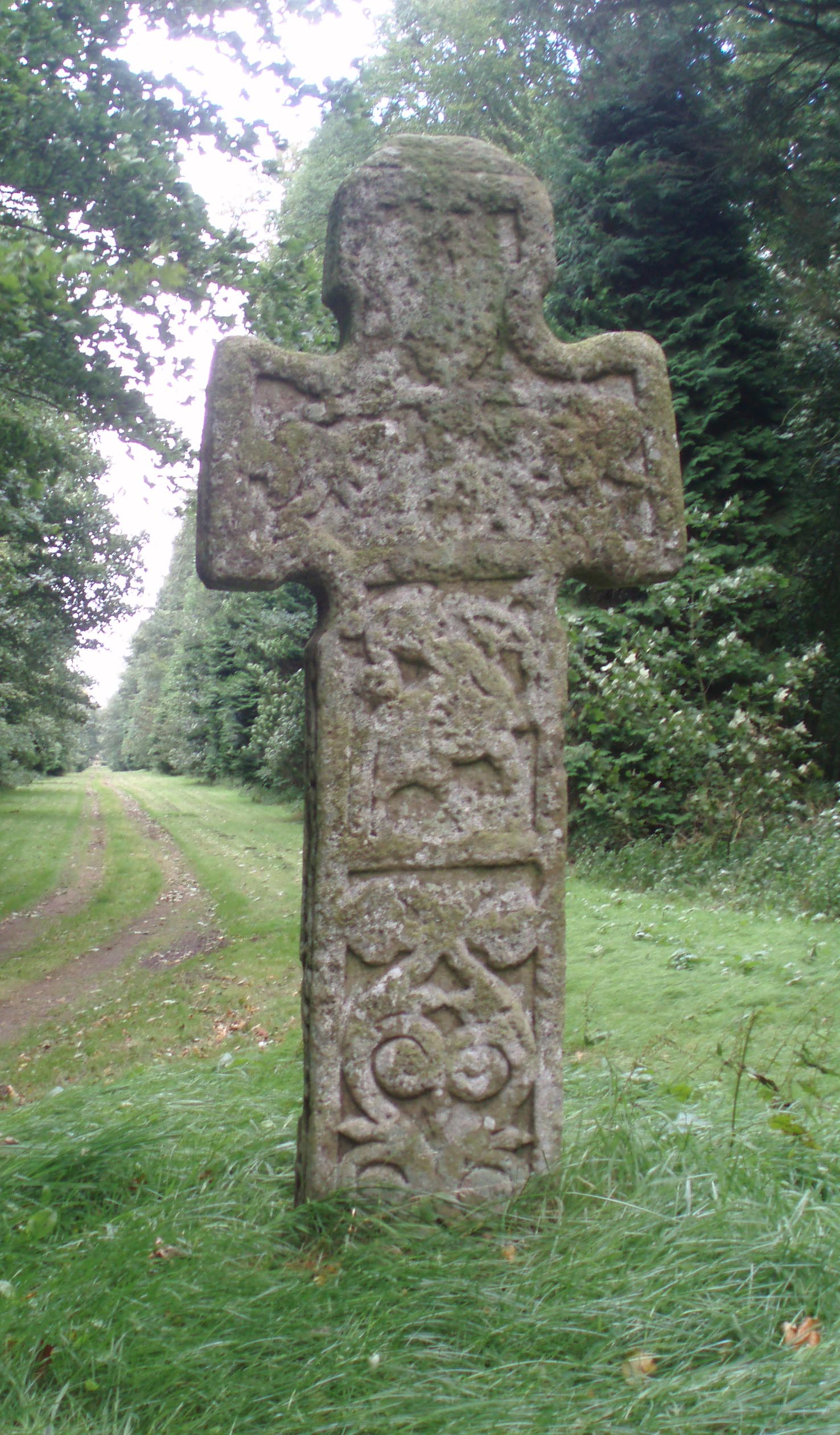
The Camus Cross, west face

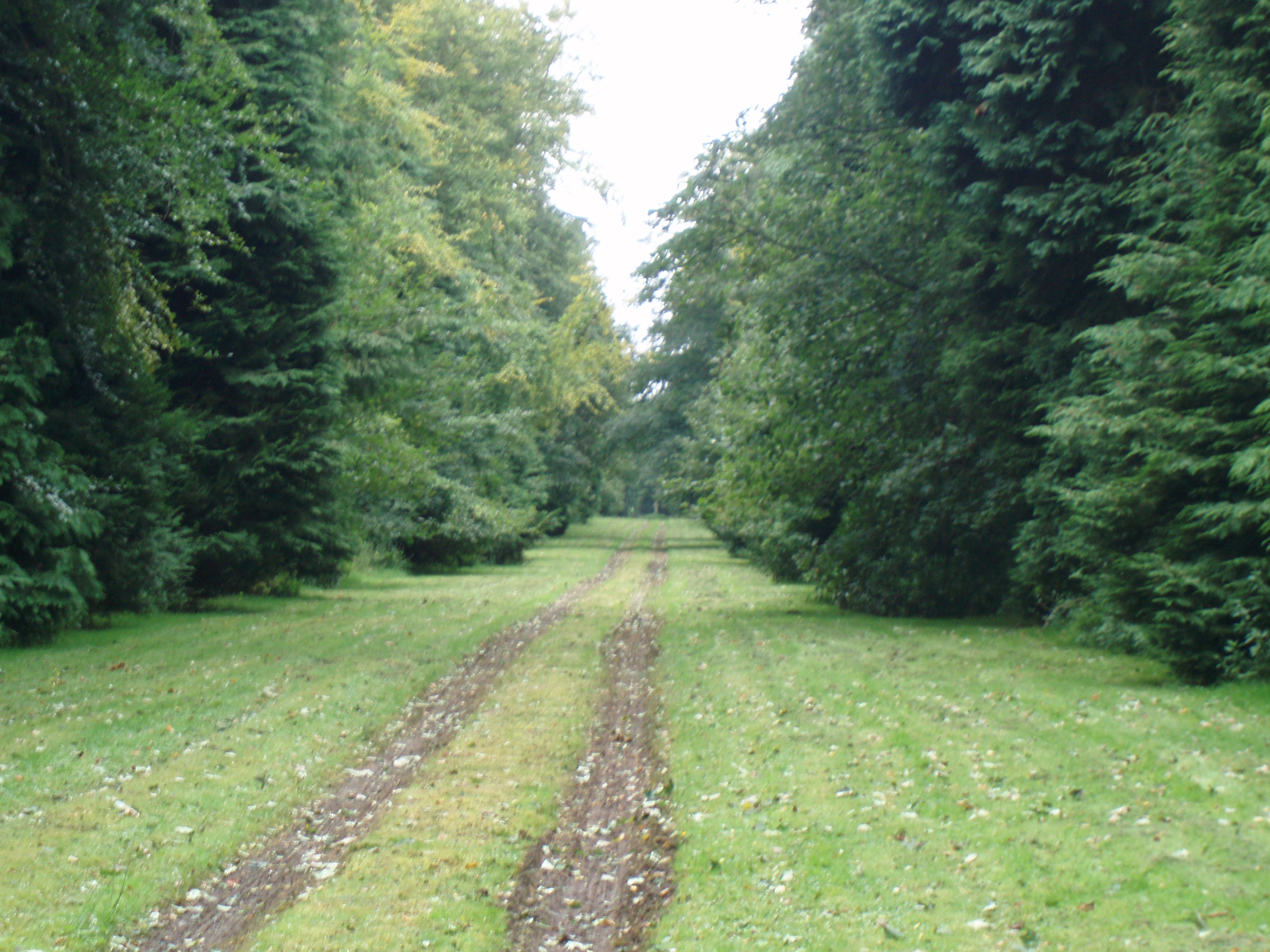
Avenue leading to Camus Cross

The Camus Cross is currently thought to be a late Pictish/early Gaelic era monument, dating from the 10th century. The earliest record of it is in a legal document of 1481, describing the boundary of the lands of Camuston, owned by Sir Thomas Maule, and the barony of Downy, owned by the Earl of Crawford. The boundary was described as running "a magna cruce lapidea de Cambiston" ('from the great stone cross of Camuston'). It was mentioned in the context of the Battle of Barry in Hector Boece's Historia Gentis Scotorum in 1527, and first described in detail by the antiquarian Robert Maule, who erected it at its present position in 1620, after moving it six feet to centralise it within the Camuston Wood avenue.

The croce standis southe and northe, sa the bread syd thear of the ane to the east and the wther to the west; that syd quhilk lowkes to the east is dewydit be mwllers of steane in thre stages; the firs and hiest part quharof is the portrait of ane man, rudlie vroght in reasit work, at the southe arme quharof as apperis, the figure of ane fowle, to the quhilk the handis neir; the second sectione or stage hes tua pourtraits of men lyk to the first, vithe the forme of ane quadrat or four noket breist plat on thear breist, lyk wnto that quhar withe Moses is painted, in the quhilk wes ingrawen the nems of the tuel tribes of Israel, and lykuayes the lawest and thrid rank efter the sam maner. On thear heads thay heawe clos bonnets twrnand hard thearto, quhilk appeirandly is Moses representine the lawe befor the cominge of Christ, and thearfor ar set towardis the east as representine the begininge and infancie of the world; then on the west syd in the first rank and hiest is the Crucifix. opposit to Moses, signifiinge the latter dayes to approche and the declyninge age. In the second rank wnder the Crucifix ane man on hors bak, lyand bak owir, drawand ane bowe, the head of the arrowe wery grytm that it semes rather to be ane bolt then arrowe, albeit the bowe dois rather appeir to be ane hand bow nor cros bowe. In the lawest and thrid rank tehar is only the draught of ane floure, weil done, wpone aa rud ane stone. On the southe and northe sydes of the sam, quhar the croce is mor narrowe, ane prettie work efter the forme that browdinsters do vse[...]

Camus was the supposed leader of a Norse expeditionary force defeated by the armies of King Malcolm II at the Battle of Barry. Tradition, popularised in the sixteenth century by historian Hector Boece, states that Camus fled the battle scene when defeat was imminent, and was caught and slain at the point where the cross now stands. The battle, and its main protagonists, including Camus, are now known to be historically inauthentic.

The name of the cross is likely to derive from the village of Camuston. No trace of this village can be seen today, and it had ceased to exist by the time of the first Ordnance Survey map, published in 1888, but surveyed in 1857 to 1859. Its former location is indicated in the 1794 map by Ainslie, about half a mile to the east of the cross. Camuston can be found with earlier spelling variations, for example, 'Cambistown' as it is called in documents from 1425 and 1426, and has a Celtic rather than Scandinavian etymology.

A burial disinterred in 1598, near the Camus cross, was attributed by Maule as being the body of Camus:

Not far thearfra in the bank of Camstone, the zeir of God I^{m} fywe hundrethe nyntie and aught zeiris, thear wos ane greawe fownd withe ane bread stone on eury quarter thearof efter the forme of ane malt cobile, quharin did ly the heale bons of ane man of gryt statwre, the thee bone quharof ves neir als longue as bothe the schank and thee bone of any reasonable man of this age, the harne pan gryte, and vanted the palme bread of ane hand thearof, quhilk had beine the straik as appeirithe of ane sword, it wes thought to heawe beine Cames the chief mans bwriel.

Little information of the burial exists, but goods found in the cist were kept at Brechin Castle. These were sketched by Jervise and are typical of Bronze Age artifacts, found fairly commonly in the area.
