= Stone of Morphie =

Standing stone in Aberdeenshire, Scotland

Coordinates: 56.7555°N 2.4644°W

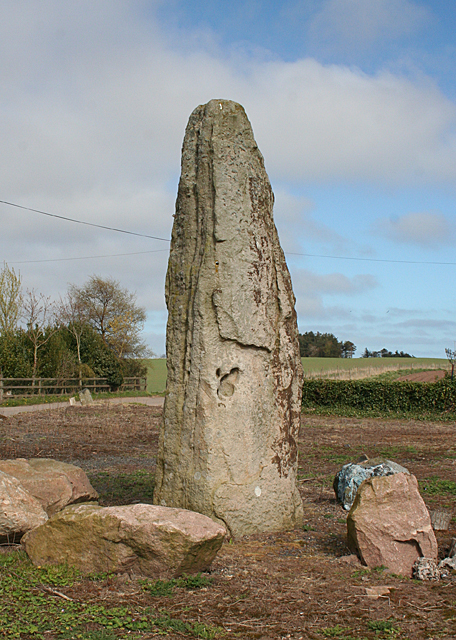
The Stone of Morphie

The Stone of Morphie (sometimes known as the Stone of Morphy) is a standing stone about 700 metres west of the Coast Highway (A92 road) bridge of the River North Esk and 400 metres east of the historic Mill of Morphie in Aberdeenshire, Scotland. The stone is approximately 3.5 metres high and is unshaped and uninscripted; the base of this stone measures approximately 70 by 100 centimetres.

The RCAHMS record number for the Stone of Morphie is NO76SW 6 7169 6273. According to RCAHMS, the stone is "Traditionally said to mark the grave of a son of Camus, killed in a battle between the Scots and the Danes". Local tradition claims the site as an alternative burial site for a leader of a Viking army that was decimated by the Scots army at the apocryphal Battle of Barry in 1010 AD. The date and mention of this battle rests with Boece.

== Etymology ==
The name Morphie may be of Brittonic origin, and derived from an element consanguineous to Welsh morfa, meaning "a sea-plain".

== See also ==
- Eassie Stone
- Lunan Water
- Red Castle, Angus
