= Glen Mark =

Glen in northern Angus, Scotland

Coordinates: 56°56′N 2°57′W

Glen Mark (Angus)

A view northwest along Glen Mark

Glen Mark is a glen in northern Angus, eastern Scotland, through which the Water of Mark flows. Near the mouth of the glen, at Auchronie, the Water of Mark is joined by the Water of Lee from Loch Lee to become the River North Esk. This flows through Glen Esk, one of the Five Glens of Angus. The land is managed by the Dalhousie estate.

== Mount Keen ==
Glen Mark provides the southern walking route to Mount Keen. Starting at the car park in Auchronie, walkers follow the glen to the Glenmark Cottage where the path rises along the northern slopes of the glen, past the peak of Couternach and climbs further to Mount Keen.

== Queen's Well ==
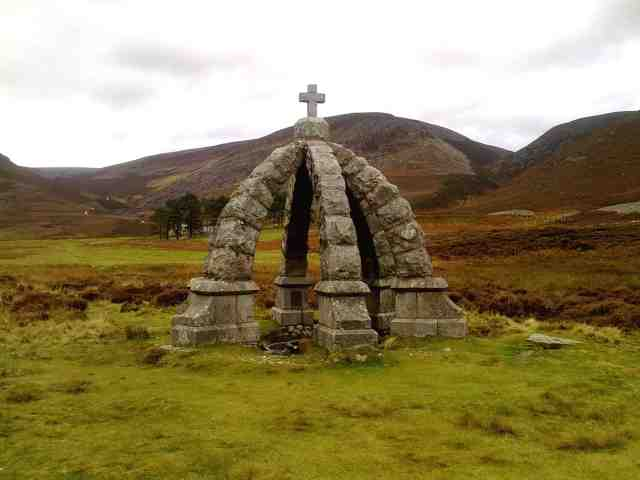
Queen's Well

Queen Victoria and her consort Prince Albert purchased Balmoral Castle and delighted in travelling the mountain routes around. In 1861 they rode the 15 miles (24 km) from Balmoral to Glen Mark and met with Lord Dalhousie beside an artesian well. Here they were refreshed by the spring water before continuing to Invermark Lodge where they stayed overnight. To commemorate the visit, Lord Dalhousie erected a monument in the shape of a royal crown over the well. An inscription on the monument reads:

Her Majesty, Queen Victoria, and his Royal Highness the Prince Consort, visited this well and drank of its refreshing waters, on the 20th September, 1861, the year of Her Majesty's great sorrow.

Andrew Jarret cautions againsting drinking from the well today; "To drink from the well now would be sheer folly as the water has been contaminated somewhat by the copper coins thrown into it by wish-makers and there is also the likelihood that some of the local sheep population have made deposits of their own".

== Balnamoon's Cave ==
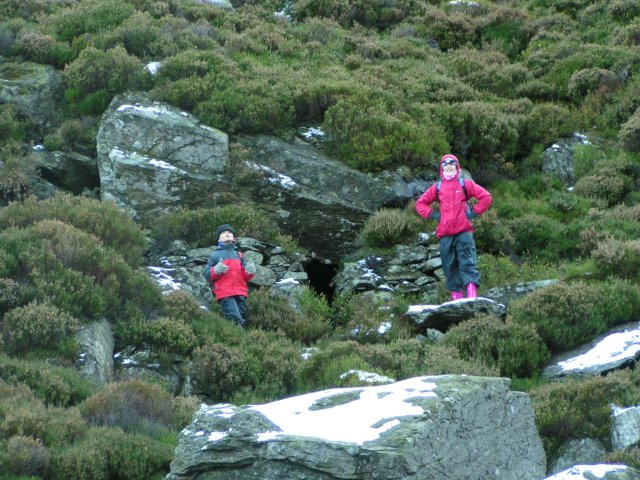
Entrance to Balnamoon's Cave

James Carnegy-Arbuthnott, Laird of Balnamoon, favoured the Jacobite cause and was known as the Rebel Laird. He was Prince Charles Edward Stuart's Deputy-Lieutenant of Forfarshire and an officer in Lord Ogilvy's Angus regiment. He survived the Battle of Culloden in 1746 and fled to Glen Esk where he was harboured by locals until he was betrayed by the local Presbyterian minister. Sent for trial in London, he was acquitted on a misnomer. (In 1745 he had added his wife's surname and territorial designation of Arbuthnott of Findowrie to his own name, from whence arose the confusion).

While outlawed, Balnamoon was actively sought by soldiers of the crown, as well as hired Highlanders. At times of greatest danger, when his pursuers were in the Angus glens, he hid out in a remote cave high in Glen Mark. The loyalty of the locals, the remote location and the difficulty in locating the small cave entrance among the rock strewn mountain sides, kept Balnamoon from being discovered and captured for a year.

== See also ==
- Glen Esk
- Battle of Culloden
