= Craigton, Angus =

Coordinates: 56.532361°N 2.796612°W

Craigton
- Location within Angus
- OS grid reference: NO511381
- Council area: Angus
- Lieutenancy area: Angus
- Country: Scotland
- Sovereign state: United Kingdom
- Post town: DUNDEE
- Postcode district: DD5
- Dialling code: 01382
- Police: Scotland
- Fire: Scottish
- Ambulance: Scottish
- UK Parliament: Dundee East
- Scottish Parliament: Angus North East Scotland

Craigton is a village in Angus, Scotland. It lies to the north of the Downie Hills, approximately three miles north of Carnoustie. Immediately to the west of the village lie the reservoirs of Monikie Country Park, and to the south is the Panmure Testimonial.

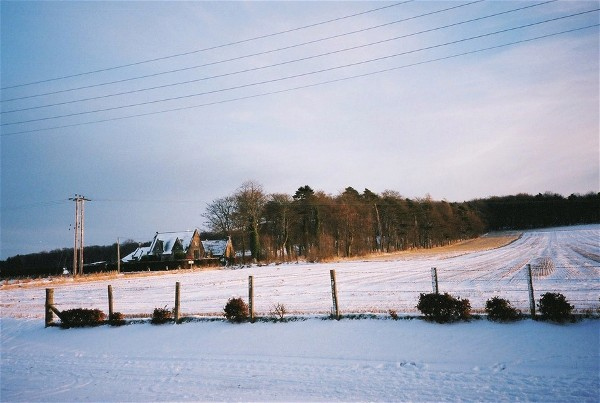
Craigton School during Winter 2009
