= Downie Hills =

Coordinates: 56.528810°N 2.790035°W

The Downie Hills are a small range of hills in Angus, Scotland, approximately 4 kilometres (2.5 mi) to the North of Carnoustie. At their highest point is the summit of Camustane Hill, where lies the Panmure Testimonial. To the east of this is a tree-lined avenue that leads via the Camus Cross to the former site of Panmure House.
