= Camus (folklore) =

Camus, in historic literature, was a Scandinavian general dispatched to engage the Scots in battle, reportedly in the early eleventh century AD. The legendary engagement was called the Battle of Barry, and was first alluded to by Boece.

The historical nature of Camus and the Battle of Barry was called into doubt in the early nineteenth century. Evidence formerly cited for the battle included the large number of human remains found on Barry Links, where the town of Carnoustie, Angus now stands, now reinterpreted as a Pictish cemetery of earlier date. The remains of a fort near Kirkbuddo, formerly known as 'Norway Dykes', from where the Danish army are supposed to have marched is now recognised to be of Roman origin.

Boece attributed Pictish sculptured stones found throughout Angus and the surrounding area to the Danish invasions. The battle depicted on the reverse of the Aberlemno kirkyard stone was cited by tradition as a depiction of the Battle of Barry. Current thought dates this stone from the mid-8th century and it is now commonly thought to depict the Battle of Dun Nechtain in 685 AD. The Camus Cross near Monikie, 2 miles north of the supposed battle site and formerly thought to be the site of Camus' death, is now thought to be of earlier, Pictish origin.

The name 'Camus' derives from 'Camuston', the location of the Camus Cross. Local tradition claims the hill to have been named in honour of Camus, but it is found in early documents as 'Cambeston' and is thought to have a Celtic rather than Scandinavian derivation.

== See also ==
- Stone of Morphie
