= Glenesk Folk Museum =

Museum in Angus, Scotland

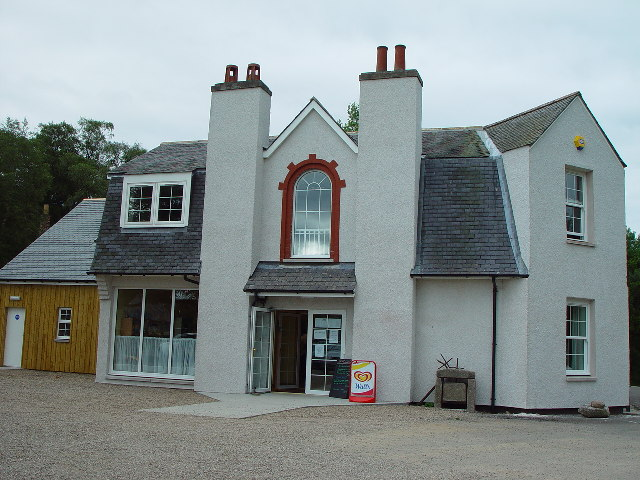

- Location within Angus
- Established: 1955
- Location: Tarfside, Angus, Scotland DD9 7YT
- Coordinates: 56.8987°N 2.8083°W
- Curator: Dr Christopher Martin
- Website: http://www.gleneskfolkmuseum.org

Glenesk Folk Museum is a museum located in the Glen Esk valley, in Tarfside, Angus, Scotland. It is about 9 miles (14 km) north of the village of Edzell. It is housed in a former shooting lodge, known as 'The Retreat', which used to belong to the Earls of Dalhousie. The museum contains artefacts and documents related to the history of the surrounding area.

== History ==
The Museum was established in 1955 by Greta Michie, a local schoolteacher who was inspired by folk museums in Scandinavia. The building used for the museum, known as 'the Retreat', had been constructed as a retirement cottage in the 1840s by Captain J.E. Wemyss. It was later expanded and used as a shooting lodge, and later a summer house by the Earls of Dalhousie, before falling into disuse. Lord and Lady Dalhousie assisted with the establishment of the museum on this site.

The museum was refurbished and expanded in 2007.

== Collections ==
The museum's artefacts are arranged thematically into rooms, including spaces covering music and costume. There are reconstructions of rooms from the 1850s, including a children's room. The museum also has a document archive for genealogical research, including Census records from 1841 to 1891 and a partial record of births, marriages and deaths in the Glen and the parishes of Edzell and Lethnot. This room has computers.

The museum has a small collection of musical instruments, highlights of which include a trapezoidal Savart-style violin that was played for many years on the streets of Aberdeen by an itinerant musician, and a coach horn known to have been used locally as late as the 1930s on one of the last horse-drawn stagecoaches operating in the United Kingdom.

== Facilities and events ==
Since its foundation, the Retreat has sold locally produced goods, and this continues in the gift shop. There is also a cafe offering light refreshments. The Retreat also has conference facilities, a function room, a nature trail and a children's play area. Regular craft workshops are run on-site, along with other events which have included music recitals and storytelling.

== See also ==
- List of music museums
