= Hunt Hill =

Hill in Angus, Scotland

Coordinates: 56.912°N 3.0183°W

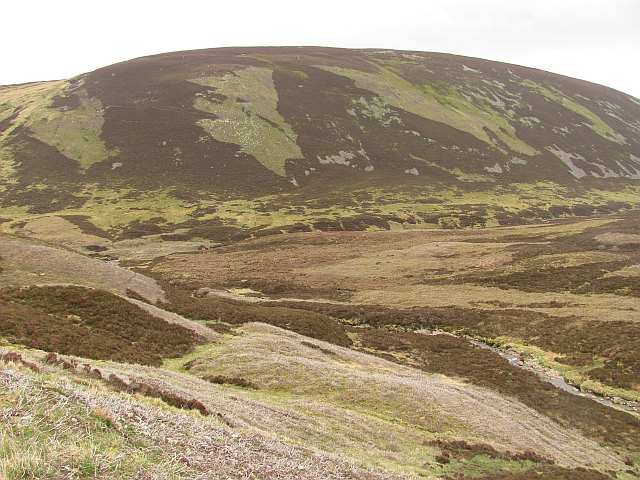
Hunt Hill seen from the north east

Hunt Hill is a hill in Angus, Scotland, in the south of the Cairngorms National Park and about 4 km (2.5 mi) west north west of Loch Lee. It reaches 705.4 m (2,314 ft) and has a prominence of 181 m (594 ft), and is a Marilyn, a Graham and a Simm. It is the 1,947th highest peak in Scotland, and the 2,321st in the United Kingdom.

Hunt Hill can be ascended from a car park at the end of the Glen Esk road, a return walk of 11 mi (18 km) taking 6 hours. The walk is described as "a splendid and varied walk to a fine hilltop" and passes the Falls of Unich and the Falls of Damp on the Water of Unich before climbing to the summit from the south; it then descends to Glen Lee in the north before rejoining the outward path along Loch Lee.
