= Camuston =

Former village in Angus, Scotland

Coordinates: 56.531586°N 2.777087°W

- Location within Angus
- OS grid reference: NO523380
- Council area: Angus
- Lieutenancy area: Angus
- Country: Scotland
- Sovereign state: United Kingdom
- Police: Scotland
- Fire: Scottish
- Ambulance: Scottish

Camuston was a village that once existed in Angus, Scotland, until the late 18th/early 19th centuries. No trace of it can be found today, but its former location on land between Panmure House and Camustane Hill can be seen for example in the 1794 map by Ainslie, about half a mile to the East of the Camus Cross. Camuston can be found with earlier spelling variations, for example, 'Cambistown' as it is called in documents from 1425–26, and has a Celtic rather than Scandinavian etymology.
