= Lunan Water =

River in Angus, Scotland

Coordinates: 56°39′N 2°30′W

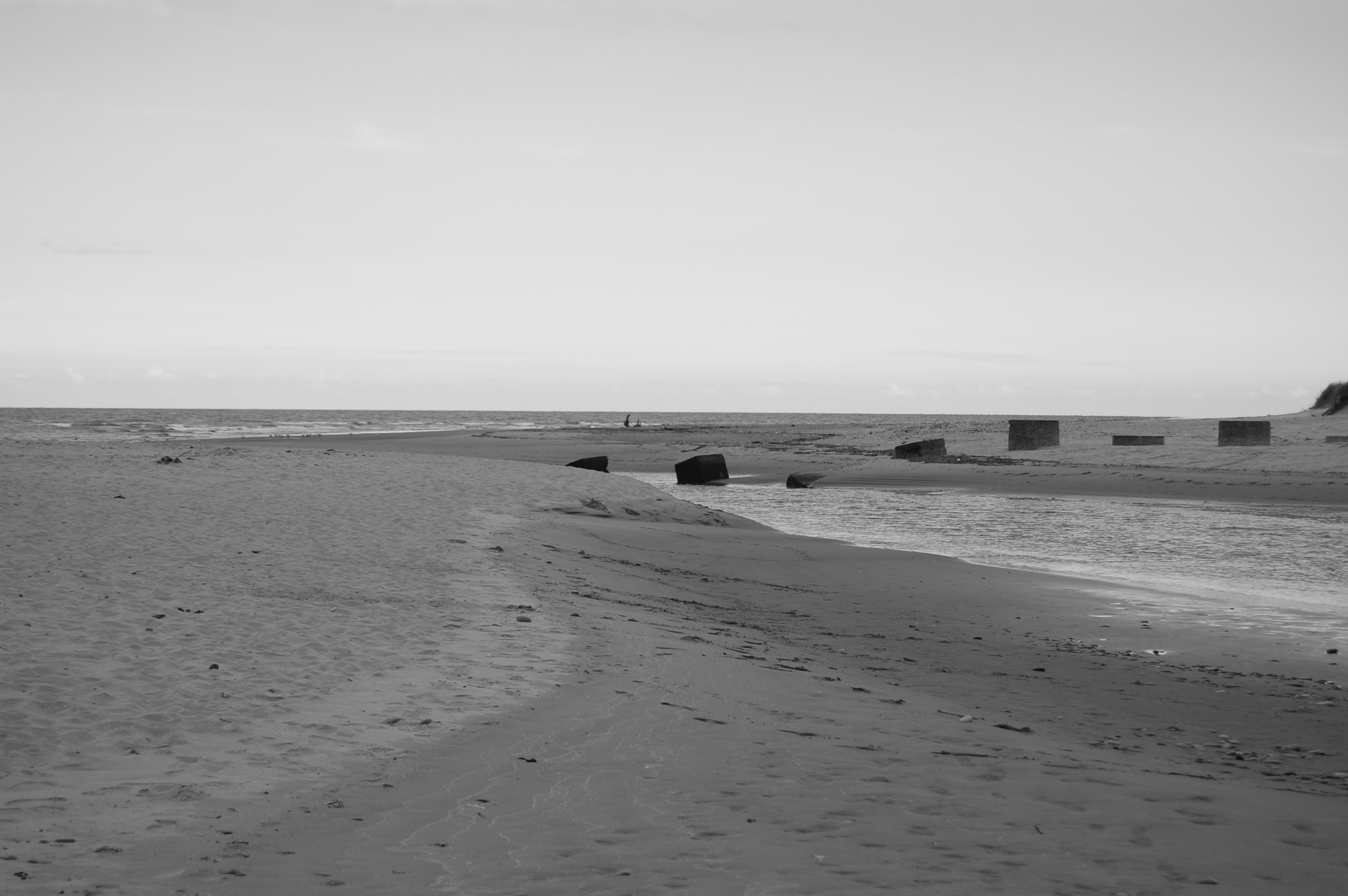
Lunan Bay. The concrete blocks across the Lunan Water are the remains of tank traps installed during World War II

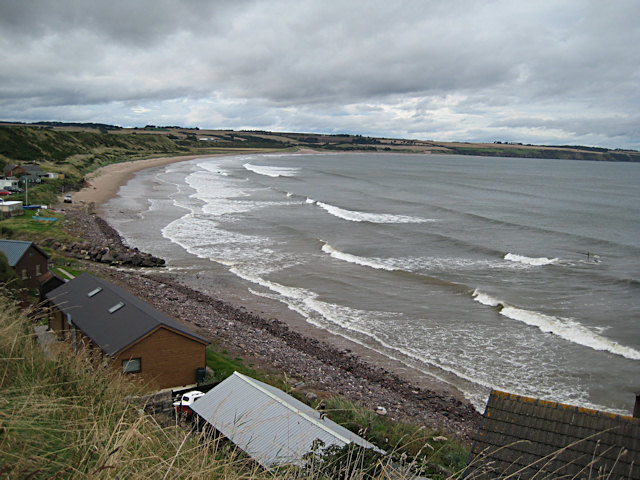
Lunan Bay from the south. Looking over the rooftops of the buildings at Corbie Knowe from the start of the cliff path. This modest vantage point provides a good view along the length of the bay.

The Lunan Water is an easterly flowing river in Angus, Scotland, that discharges to the North Sea 11 kilometres (6.8 mi) north of the town of Arbroath. Draining chiefly agricultural lands, this stream has a moderate level of turbidity and a pH level of approximately 8.7. Other nearby watercourses discharging to the North Sea include River North Esk and River South Esk, both to the north.

The Lunan Water rises at Lunanhead, a mile north-east of Forfar, and its upper catchment, the Lunan Basin, contains several lochs and fen wetlands, such as Restenneth Moss, Rescobie Loch and Balgavies Loch. Much of this upper catchment is designated as nature reserves or Sites of Special Scientific Interest due to the diverse wetland habitats and wildlife here. It passes through several villages on its course, including Guthrie, Friockheim and Inverkeilor. At its mouth the Lunan Water meets the North Sea at the hamlet of Lunan, upon Lunan Bay. The beach at Lunan Bay was voted the "best beach in Scotland" in a survey conducted in the year 2000. The 15th-century ruins of Red Castle are located at the river mouth, close to Lunan.

The valley of the Lunan Water was historically known as Strathbeg, from the Scottish Gaelic Srath Beag, "little strath", in comparison to Strathmore.

== See also ==
- Stone of Morphie
