= Rescobie Loch =

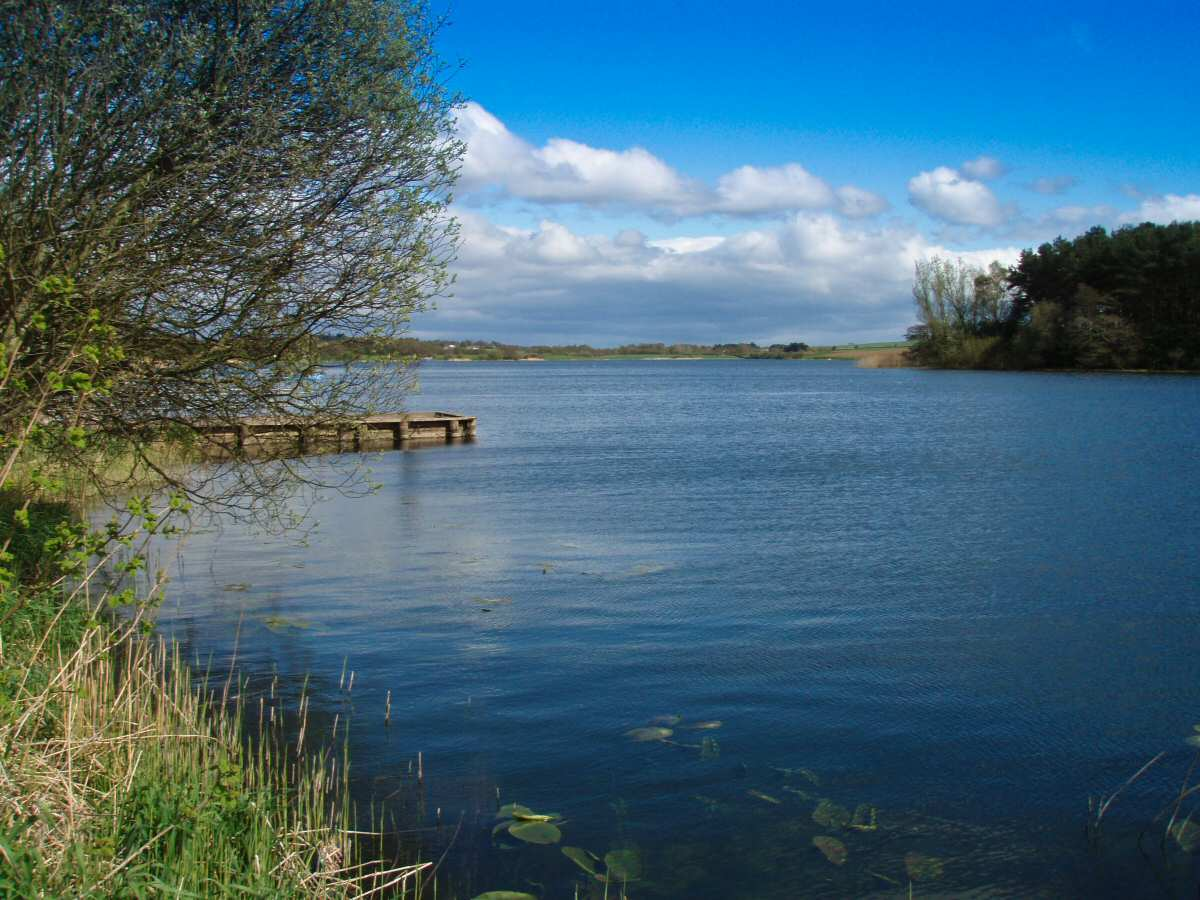

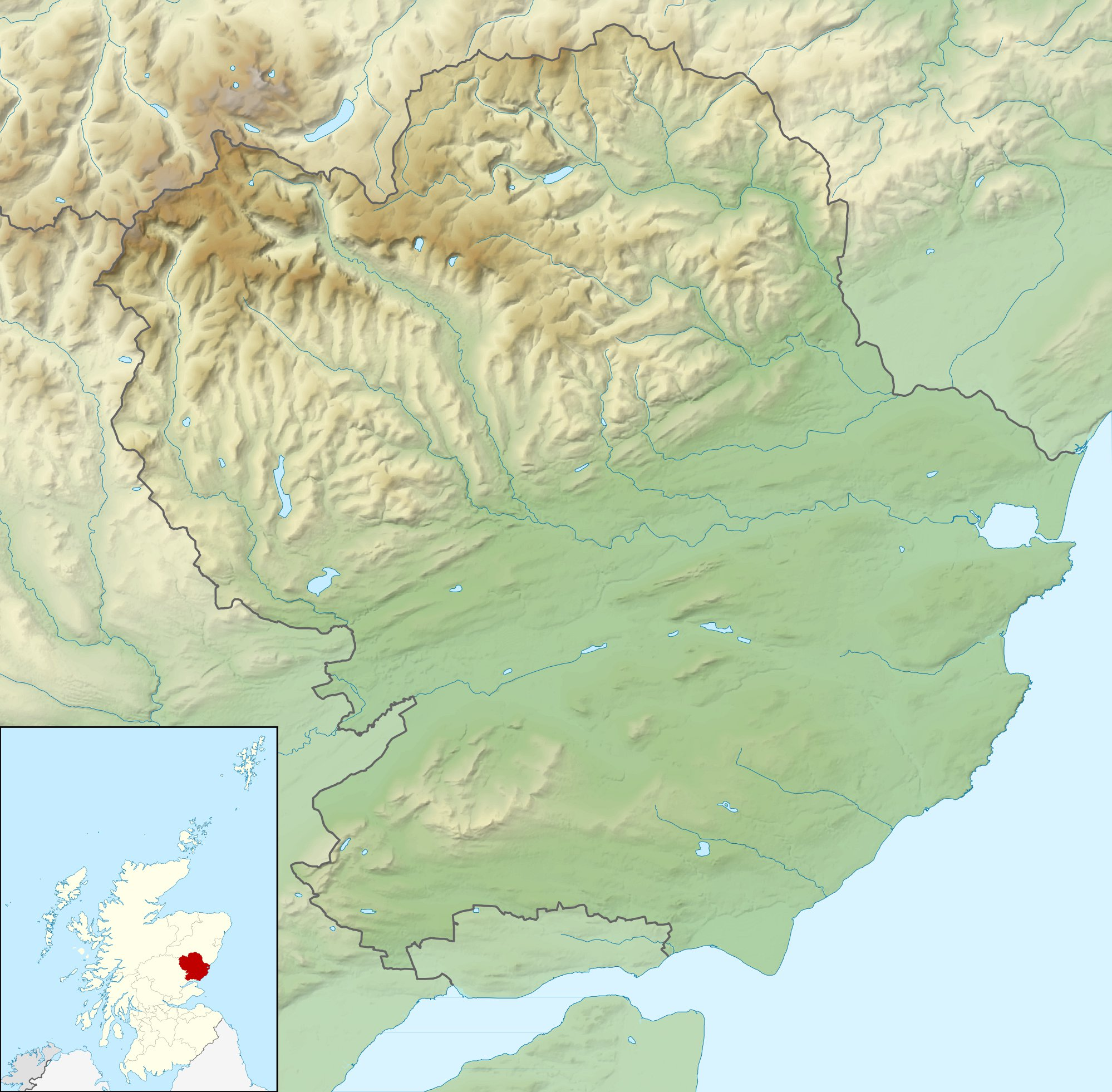
- Location within Angus
- Location: Rescobie, Angus, Scotland
- Coordinates: 56°39′19″N 2°47′47″W
- Type: freshwater loch
- Primary inflows: Lunan Water
- Primary outflows: Lunan Water
- Max. length: 2 km (1.2 mi)
- Max. width: 0.55 km (0.34 mi)
- Surface area: 0.59 km^{2} (0.23 sq mi)
- Max. depth: 6m (20ft)
- Shore length^{1}: 5.8km (3.6 miles)
- Surface elevation: 60 m (200 ft)
- ^{1} Shore length is not a well-defined measure.

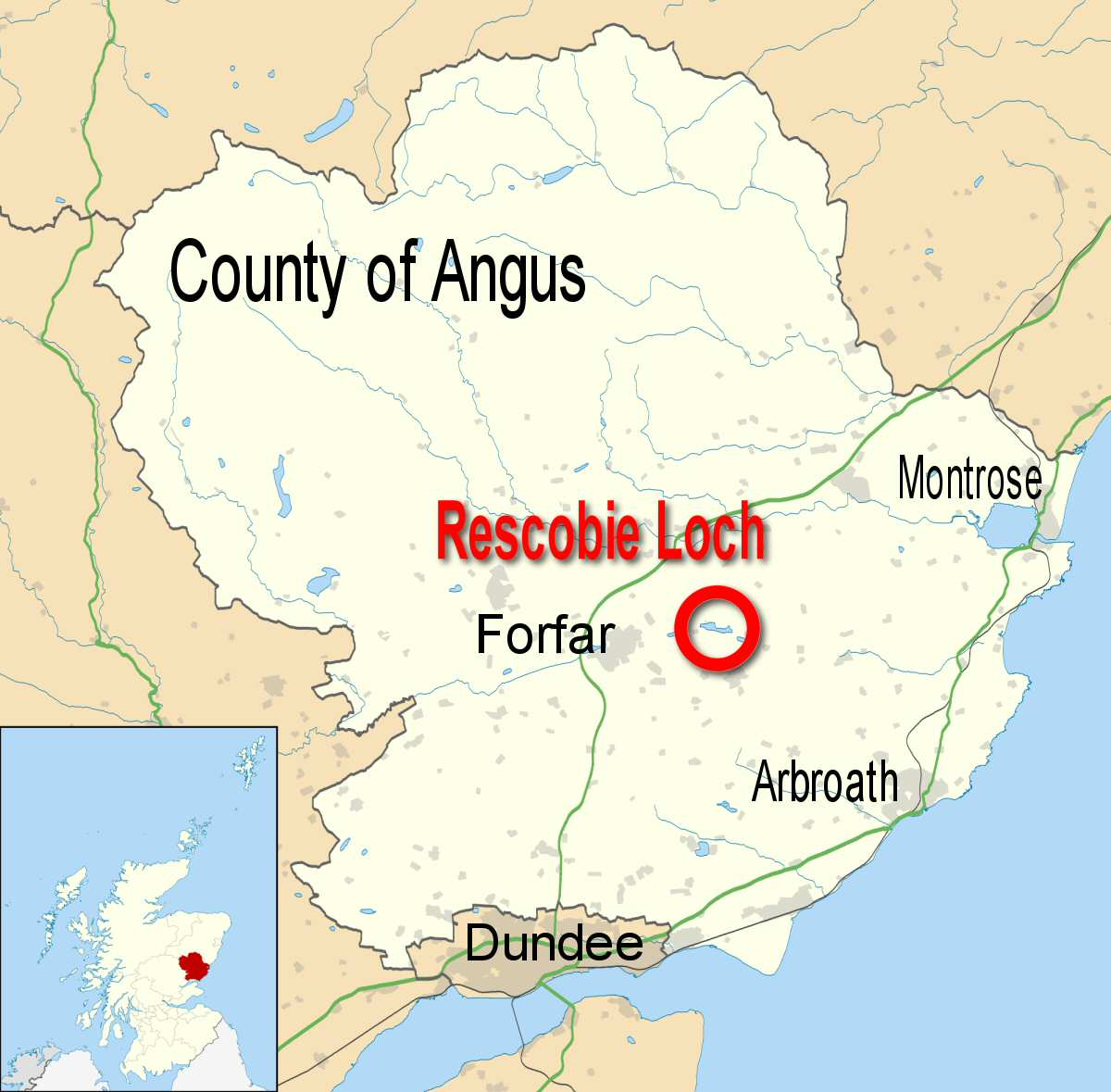
Location of Rescobie Loch

Rescobie Loch is a post glacial fresh water body located in the parish of Rescobie, 4 km (2.5 mi) to the East of Forfar, in the county of Angus, Scotland. The loch is fed by Lunan Water which enters from the West and exits to the East.

== History ==
Rescobie's name may have originated from the Scottish Gaelic “Ros Sgolban” meaning "the wood of splinters or thorns“. Historically it has also been referred to as Rosolpin, Roscolpin, Roscolbyn, Roscoby and Rescobis. Historically Rescobie's importance far exceeded its present-day status.

Rescobie Loch is believed to be the location of Rescobie Castle also referred to as Barnsdale Castle. There is no trace of the castle today.

In 1097 King Donald III of Scotland was dethroned and held captive in Rescobie Castle where his brother Edgar blinded him in both eyes. He died in 1099 and was buried initially at Dunkeld Cathedral before being finally laid to rest at the Scottish Island of Iona and was the last of the early Scottish Kings to be buried there.

== Biodiversity ==
Rescobie Loch together with its neighbour, Balgavies Loch, have been classified as a Biological Site of Special Scientific Interest (SSSI code 1345) and as such are protected and monitored. It is a diverse habitat for both wildlife and plants.

== Fishing ==
In the early 1960s the Rescobie Loch Development Association was formed to manage and run the fishing. Only fly fishing is allowed from either bank or boat and the loch is regularly stocked with Rainbow Trout and Brown Trout.

== Gallery ==
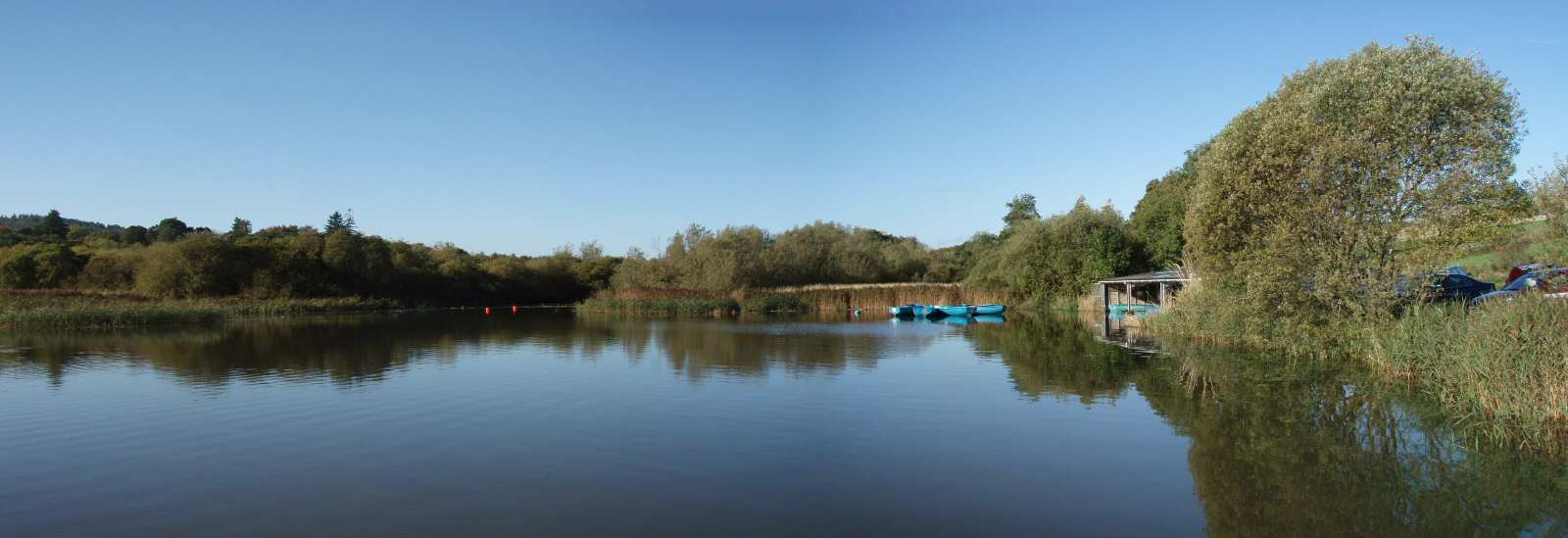
Rescobie Loch - View West towards boathouse

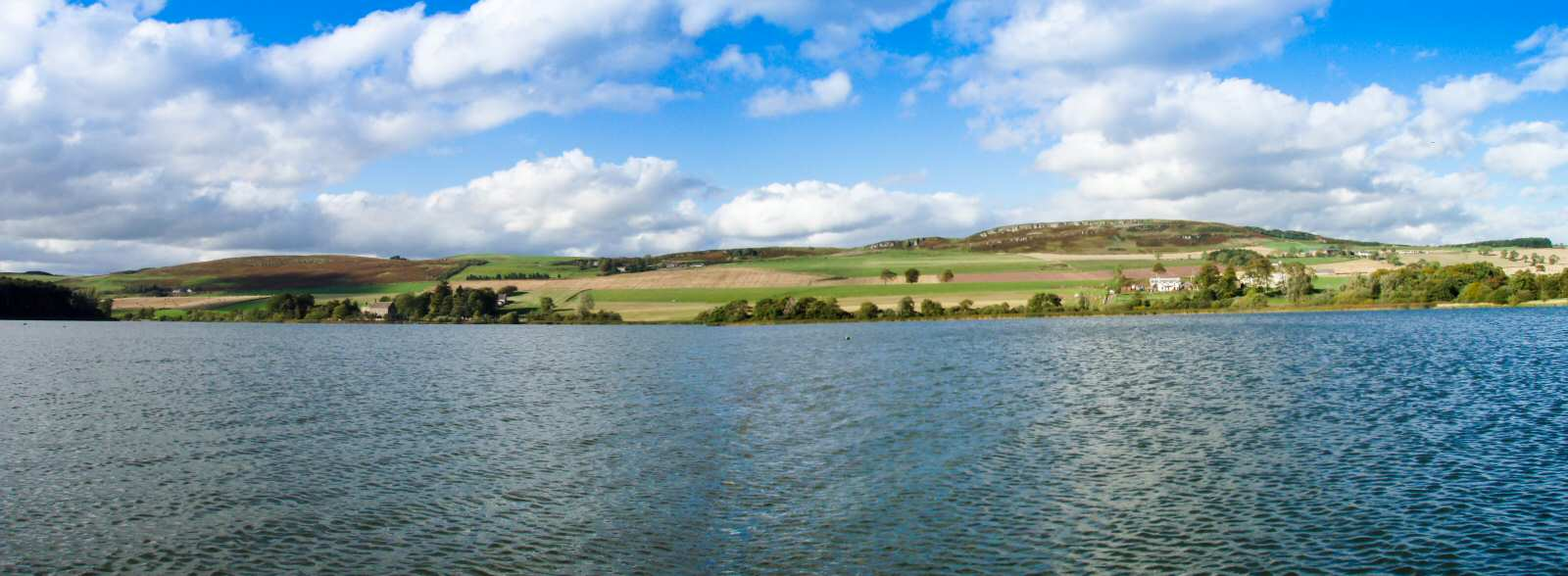
Rescobie Loch - View North towards Turin Hill

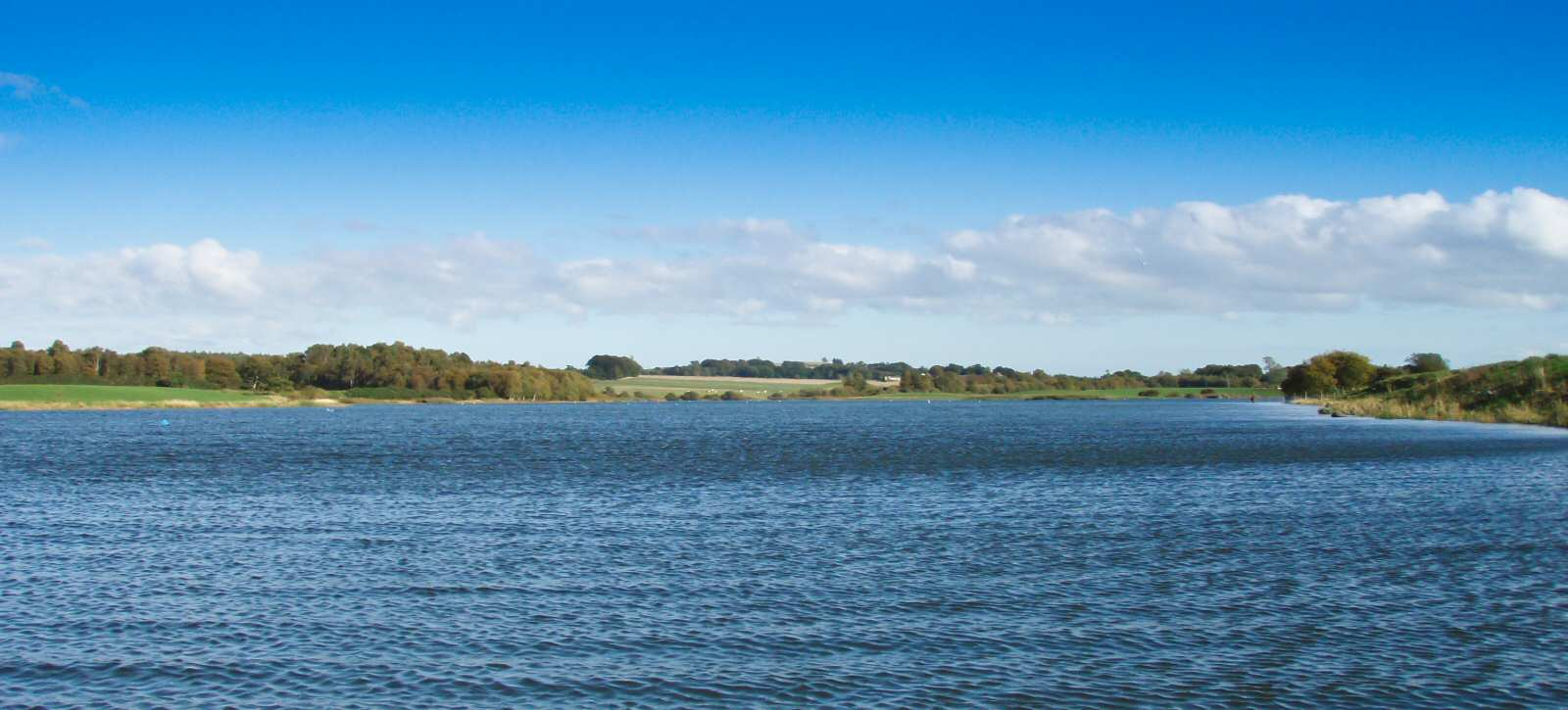
Rescobie Loch - View East

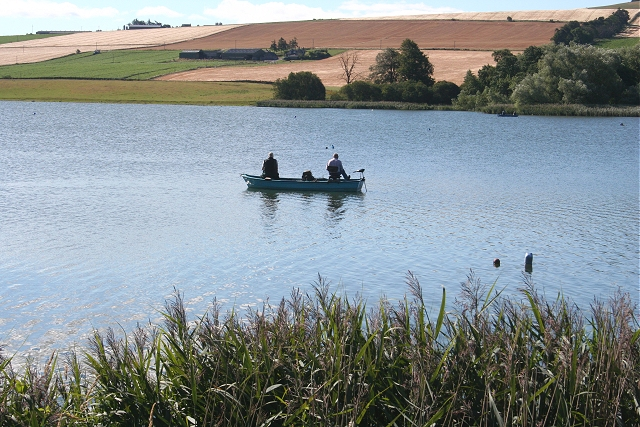
Rescobie Loch - View South

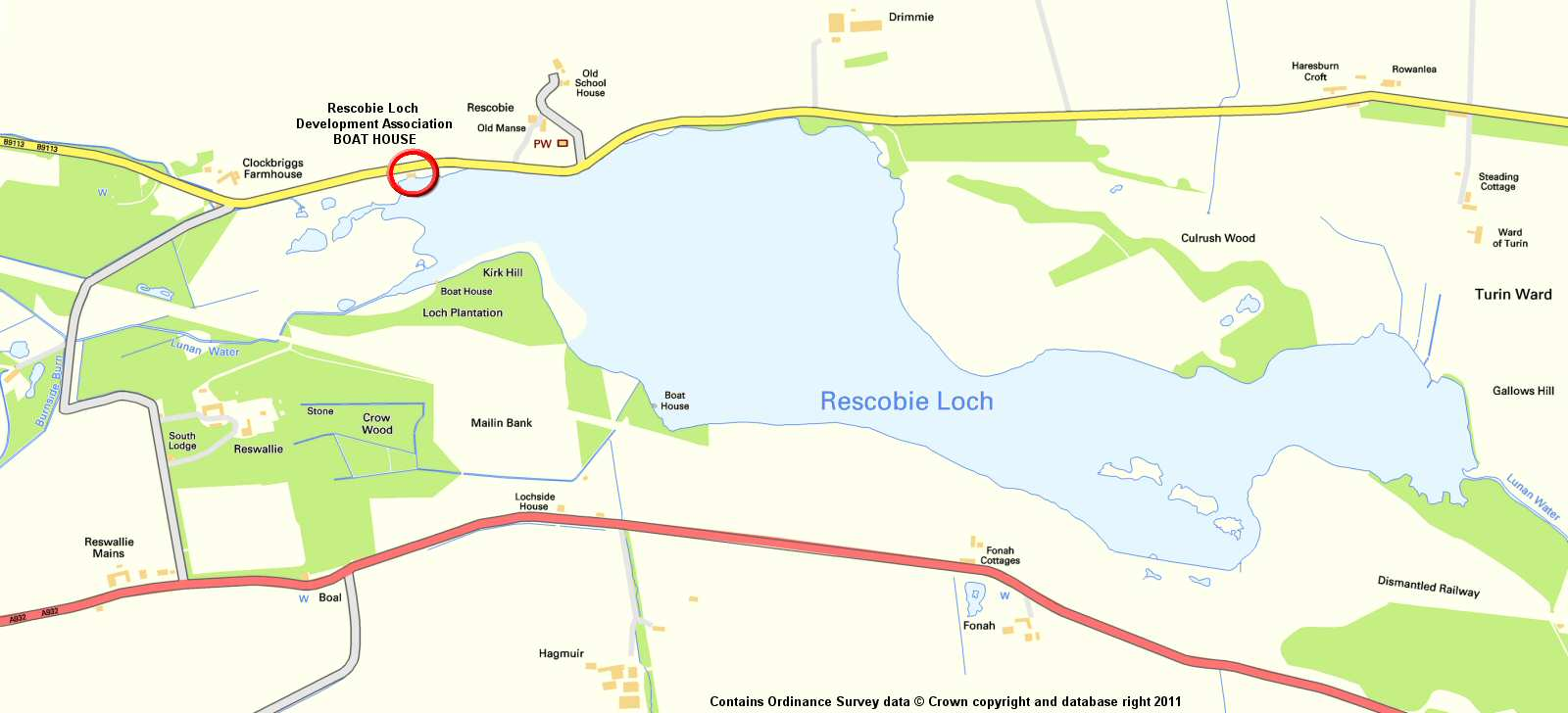
Rescobie Loch, OS Streetview Map
