= Tarfside =

Coordinates: 56.904963°N 2.832445°W

Tarfside: Scottish Gaelic: Bruach Tarbha
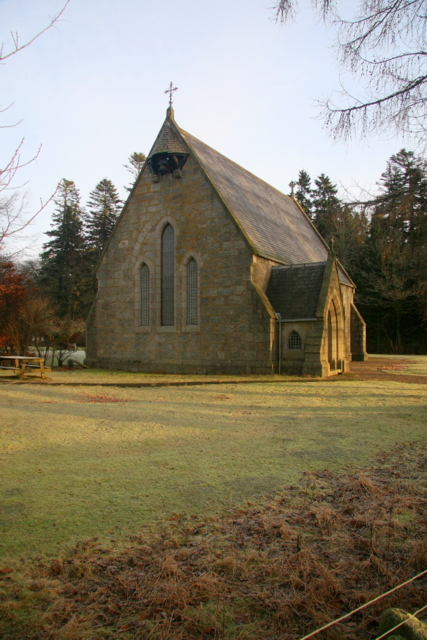
- St Drostan's Episcopal Church

- Location within Angus
- OS grid reference: NO494796
- Council area: Angus
- Lieutenancy area: Angus
- Country: Scotland
- Sovereign state: United Kingdom
- Post town: BRECHIN
- Postcode district: DD9
- Dialling code: 01356
- Police: Scotland
- Fire: Scottish
- Ambulance: Scottish
- UK Parliament: Angus
- Scottish Parliament: Angus North and Mearns

Tarfside is a small hamlet in Angus, Scotland. It is situated in Glen Esk, on the upper course of the River North Esk, around 8 miles north of Edzell, and has a footpath to nearby Loch Lee. Tarfside is commonly seen as a very beautiful place for walkers.

Tarfside is the location of an Episcopal church, St Drostan's, which was built in 1879 in memory of Alexander Penrose Forbes, Bishop of Brechin. This replaced earlier Episcopal meeting houses in Glen Esk. The church has had no resident clergyman since 1921 and is currently served from Brechin. The church also has a lodge which provides accommodation for groups or individuals.

During the Second World War, a secret Auxiliary Unit known as the "Tarfside Patrol" was based in the area. This was led by Sgt William Henderson Kidd, who reported to the Group Commander Captain H.A. Ferrier, and Asst G.C. Lieut A.J. Mackie. An underground base would have been made which the patrol would have gone into hiding if the Germans had invaded. Research by the British Resistance Archive/Coleshill Auxiliary Research Team has identified the patrol members, but so far not the operational base (bunker).

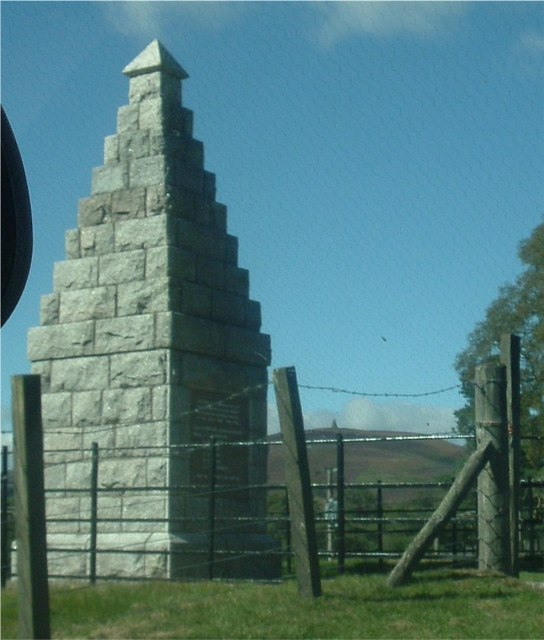
War memorial at Tarfside
