= Mill of Morphie =

Historic waterwheel in Aberdeenshire, Scotland

Coordinates: 56.7563°N 2.4706°W

The Mill of Morphie is a historic waterwheel in Aberdeenshire, Scotland. The Mill of Morphie is situated nearby to the Stone of Morphie, an unshaped extant standing stone.

== See also ==
- River North Esk
