= Battle of Barry =

Legendary battle in 1010 AD

Coordinates: 56°30′04″N 2°42′30″W

- Part of the Viking Invasions of Scotland
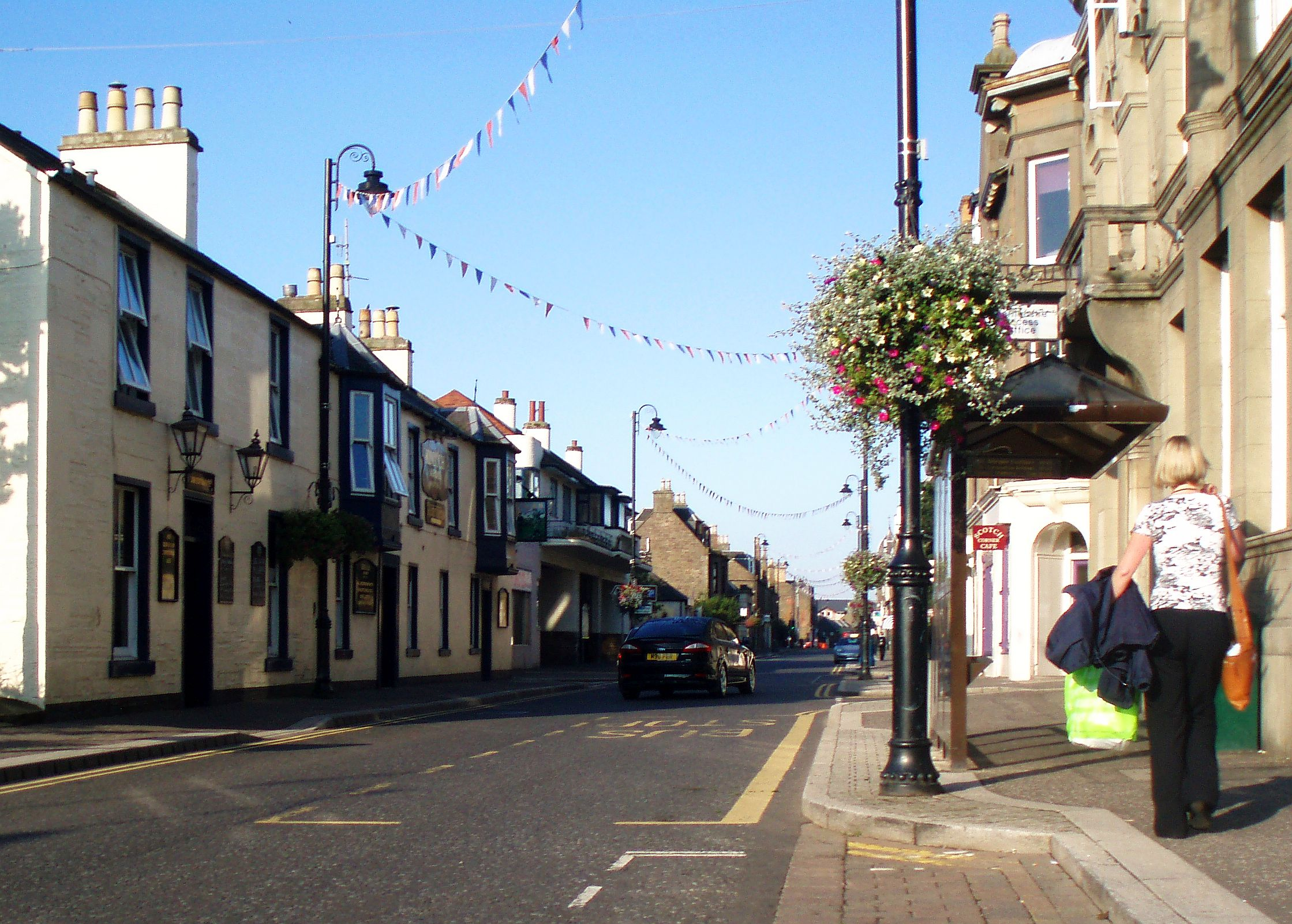
- Carnoustie High Street, traditional site of the Battle of Barry
Date	2 February 1010
Location	The boundary of Panbride and Barry parishes, Angus.
Result	Scottish victory

Belligerents
Kingdom of Scotland	Kingdom of Denmark

Commanders and leaders
King Malcolm II	Camus †

The Battle of Barry is a legendary battle in which the Scots, purportedly led by Malcolm II, defeated a Danish invasion force in 1010 AD. Its supposed site in Carnoustie, Angus can be seen in early Ordnance Survey maps. The history of the event relies heavily on tradition and it is considered to be apocryphal. The battle was named for the parish of Barry, rather than the village, and was formerly thought to have taken place at the mouth of the Lochty burn, in the vicinity of the area that is now occupied by Carnoustie High Street. While the battle is not historically authentic, its romantic appeal continues to capture the popular imagination.

== Account of battle ==
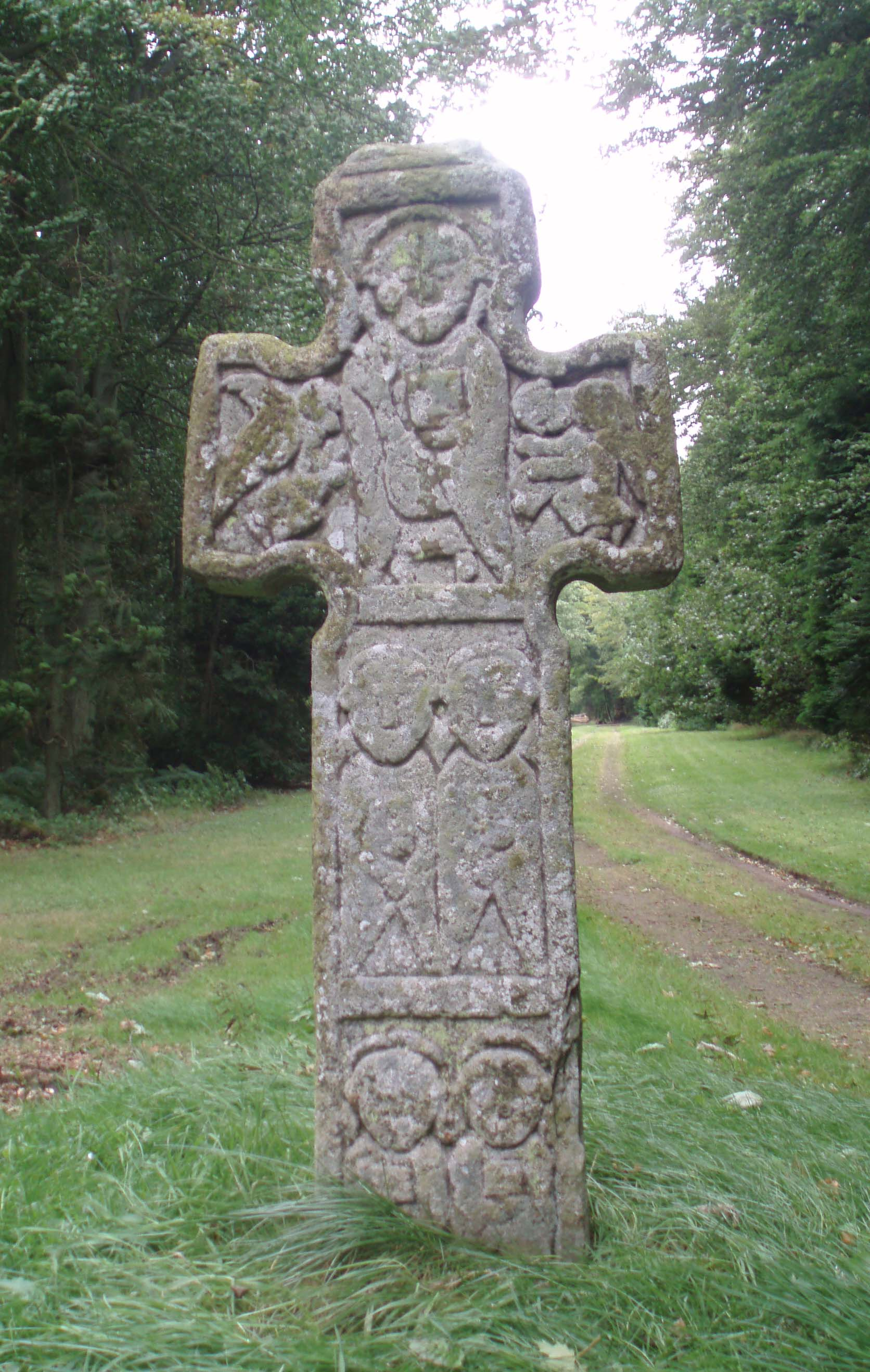
The Camus Cross

The account of the battle was first reported by sixteenth century Scots historian, Hector Boece.

Boece informs us that Sueno, king of Denmark and England, unhappy with news of his army's defeat at Mortlach, ordered a naval task force to set sail for Scotland. Part of the force was to sail from Denmark, and the rest from the Thames, both under the command of Camus.

According to the legendary account, the army camped at St Abb's Head for several days before sailing north, landing at Lunan Bay in Angus. After sacking Montrose, the Army headed inland and razed the town of Brechin to the ground. Camus received word that King Malcolm II had brought the Scots army to Dundee and ordered the Danish army to march South, reaching the coast near to Panbride. The Scots army set camp at Barry, two miles to the West.

The two sides met and fought in the vicinity of the Lochty Burn, near where Carnoustie town centre now lies. The fighting is said to have been so fierce that the Lochty burn ran red with the blood of the fallen.

Seeing that the battle was lost, Camus fled to the hills, pursued by Robert de Keith (purported ancestor of the Marischals of Scotland), who caught up with and slew him at Brae Downie where, it is said, the Camus Cross (NO 519379) was erected in memory of him.

Afterwards King Malcolm is said to have dipped his fingers in Camus' blood and to have run them along the top of Robert's shield, thus creating the red and gold striped design still used today in the Keith coat of arms.

== Evidence of battle ==
=== Written record ===
The first report of the battle can be found in Hector Boece's Historia Gentis Scotorum, written in 1527. Boece's work was popularised following a fairly free translation by John Bellenden into Scots in 1536, and its subsequent translation into English by Raphael Holinshed ca. 1580. No record of the battle is found before Boece.

While George Buchanan (ca. 1579) also mentions the battle in his work Rerum Scotarum Historia, his account borrows liberally from Boece. Boece is thought to have based much of his work on John of Fordun's, Chronica Gentis Scotorum (ca. 1360). Fordun briefly mentions a battle at Mortlach but makes no mention of any at Barry:

Malcolm, thinking over the manifold blessings continually bestowed upon him by God, pondered anxiously in his mind what he should give Him in return. At length, the grace of the Holy Ghost working within him, he set his heart upon increasing the worship of God; so he established a new episcopal see at Marthillach (Mortlach), not far from the spot where he had overcome the Norwegians, and gained the victory; and endowed it with churches, and the rents of many estates.

It is possible that Fordun's account of the Battle of Mortlach is due to a distortion of local tradition. Mortlach is nearby the site of the battle in which Máel Coluim mac Donnchada (Malcolm III) wrested power from Lulach. Máel Coluim's first wife, Ingibiorg Finnsdottir, was the niece of Harald III of Norway, and it has been argued by Alex Woolf that the tradition of a battle between the Scots and Norwegians is due to a Scandinavian involvement on the side of Máel Coluim.

It is thought that, as a native of the area in which the Battle of Barry is supposed to have occurred, Boece may have used local folklore as his source. Boece is no longer regarded as a credible historical source.

In some versions of the story, Camus and his army camped prior to the battle at a location previously known as 'Norway Dykes', near Kirkbuddo, to the north of Carnoustie, and the battle took place the day after the feast day of St Brigid. For example, Gordon quotes Robert Maule from his 'De Antiquitate Gentis Scotorum' (1609):

About eight miles from Brechin, at Karboddo [Kirkbuddo], a place belongs to the Earl of Crawford, are to be seen the vestiges of a Danish camp, fortified with a rampart and ditch, and vulgarly called Norway Dikes; near which is the village of Panbridge [Panbride], where anciently was a church dedicated to St Brigide, because on that saint's day which preceded the battle, Camus, general of the Danes, pitched his camp there.

This places the battle on 2 February, St Brigid's day being 1 February.

=== Archaeological evidence ===
The story of the battle appears to have originated due to a romantic misinterpretation of the numerous tumuli that existed towards the eastern boundary of Barry parish, near the Lochty burn before the town of Carnoustie was founded in the late 18th century.

Raphael Holinshed (ca. 1580) claimed that the bodies found in the area were those of Danish soldiers, slain in the battle:

King Malcolme after he obteined this famous victorie (as before is said) at Barre, he caused the spoile of the field to be divided amongest his souldiers, according to the laws of armes; and then caused the dead bodies of the Danes to be buried in the place where the field had baene fought, and the bodies of the Scottishmen which were found dead were conveied unto the places of christian buriall, and there buried with funerall obsequies in sundrie churches and churchyards. There are seene manie bones of the Danes in those places where they were buried, there lieng bare above ground even unto this day, the sands (as it often chanceth) being blowen from them.

Doubt was cast on this by Robert Dickson in 1878, when he pointed out that, while relatively high-status goods were found in some of the graves disinterred during early building work in Carnoustie, there was a lack of weapons. He also talked of the apparent presence of female skeletons. Subsequent finds pointed to the area being a domestic Pictish Long-Cist cemetery, including the remains of a female aged between 40 and 50 with osteoarthritis, who apparently died of tuberculosis. In contrast with Holinshed's account, the burials there are Christian, found in a supine, east–west orientation.

The Danish involvement in the 'battle' centres entirely on an apparently common misinterpretation of Pictish archaeology. For example, Boece interprets the battle scene on the Kirkyard Stone at Aberlemno as being an account of another battle between the Scots and Danes, in the aftermath of the Battle of Barry:

Ane othir cumpany of Danis, fleand in the samin maner, war slane at Abirlennon, not IV milis fra Brechin: quhare ane gret stane is ingravin with crafty letteris, to advertis the passingeris of the anciant and illuster dedis done be our eldaris aganis the Danis.

This view was the norm for some time after Boece and is reflected in the Statistical Accounts for Aberlemno. It took until the mid-19th century for it to be pointed out that not only was there no evidence that the stones were Scandinavian in origin, there was also ample evidence that the stones were Pictish/Scottish in origin. The kirkyard stone predates the Battle of Barry by three centuries and the most widely accepted interpretation is that the stone commemorates the Pictish victory at the historical Battle of Dun Nechtain in 685 AD.

The archaeological remains at Kirkbuddo, previously attributed to a Danish camp are now known to have been a temporary Roman marching camp.

=== Camus ===
No written evidence of Camus exists outside of the body of work which followed Boece. The story of Camus is likely to have been a misunderstanding of the name 'Camuston', or as it is in Boece's account (as translated by Bellenden), Camustane:

Quhil at last, the Danis war vincust, and Camus chasit to the montanis. The Scottis followit on him with sic fury, that he was finaly slane. In signe heirof, the place, quhare he was slane, is callit yit, Camustane.

Camuston no longer exists as a village, but for location see for example the 1794 map by Ainslie. The Camuston Cross, once thought to mark the place of Camus' death, is now thought to be a late Pictish era monument, dating from the 10th Century. 'Camus' is not recognisable as a Scandinavian name, and that there are earlier variants of the place name, e.g. 'Cambistown' as it is called in documents from 1425 to 1426, which has a Celtic etymology.

A burial disinterred near the Camuston cross was attributed by Maule as being the body of Camus:

Nine years after I wrote that treatise, a plough turning up the ground discovered a sepulchre, believed to be that of Camus, enclosed with four great stones. Here a huge skeleton was dug up, supposed to have been the body of Camus; it appeared to have received its death by a wound on the back part of the head, seeing a considerable part of the skull was cut away, and probably by the stroke of a sword

Little information of the burial exists, but goods found in the cist were kept at Brechin Castle. These were sketched by Jervise and are typical of Bronze Age artefacts, found fairly commonly in the area.
