= River North Esk, Angus =

River in Angus and Aberdeenshire, Scotland

North Esk
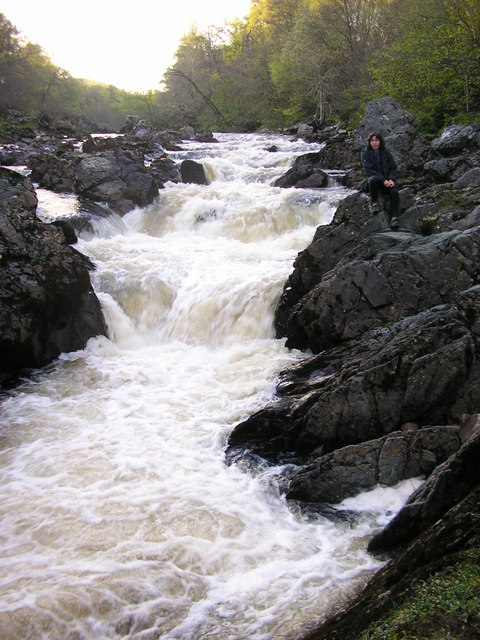
- Waterfalls at the Rocks of Solitude, River North Esk
- Native name: Easg Thuath (Scottish Gaelic)

Location
- Country: Scotland

Physical characteristics
- Mouth: North Sea
  - coordinates: 56°45′06″N 2°25′54″W

The North Esk (Scottish Gaelic: Easg Thuath) is a river in Angus and Aberdeenshire, Scotland. It is formed by the meeting of the Water of Mark (from Glen Mark) and the Water of Lee (from Loch Lee), and enters the North Sea four miles north of Montrose. It forms the boundary between Angus and Aberdeenshire at certain stages in its course. It was also noted in the 19th century as a good point for fishing.

== Tributaries ==
Downstream of the meeting of the headwaters referred to above, the River North Esk is joined by various other tributaries. The Water of Effock enters on its right side and then the Water of Tarf enters on its left bank at Tarfside. The West Water is a considerable right bank tributary which enters near Stracathro in Strathmore. Its upper reaches are known as the Water of Saughs. The Luther Water is the last significant tributary of the North Esk; it enters on the left bank near North Water Bridge. The Luther Water drains the Howe of the Mearns.

== Glen Esk ==
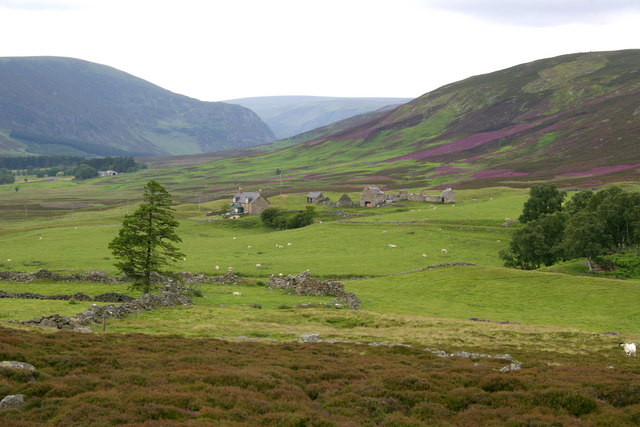
Glen Esk

=== Villages ===
==== Tarfside ====
Tarfside is home to the Glen Esk Folk Museum. St Drostan's is the episcopal church built by Lord Forbes in 1880. Drostan had lived as a hermit in Glen Esk. St Andrews Lodge is the Masonic Lodge built in 1821 by Lord Panmure. The Masons' Tower was built on the Modlach, a hill above the village in 1826.

=== Natural features ===
The Rocks of Solitude is a local beauty spot where the River North Esk flows through a narrow gorge in a series of waterfalls at the point where the river crosses the Highland Boundary Fault.

There is a folktale that a Glen Esk piper was once kidnapped by fairies as he played near the river, and that his music can occasionally still be heard in the distance.

== See also ==
- Mill of Morphie
- Glen Mark
