= Kirkbuddo =

Coordinates: 56.579855°N 2.815518°W

Kirkbuddo: Scottish Gaelic: Cair Bhuite
- Location within Angus
- OS grid reference: NO500434
- Council area: Angus
- Lieutenancy area: Angus
- Country: Scotland
- Sovereign state: United Kingdom
- Post town: FORFAR
- Postcode district: DD8
- Dialling code: 01307
- Police: Scotland
- Fire: Scottish
- Ambulance: Scottish
- UK Parliament: Angus
- Scottish Parliament: Angus South

Kirkbuddo (Scots pronunciation: [karˈbʌdə]; Scottish Gaelic: Cair Bhuite) is a village in the county of Angus, Scotland, between the towns of Forfar and Carnoustie. Nearby lie the remains of a temporary Roman marching camp dating to the third century AD. A worn type II Pictish stone was found in the kirkyard there in the mid-twentieth century and has subsequently been donated to the Meffan institute in Forfar.

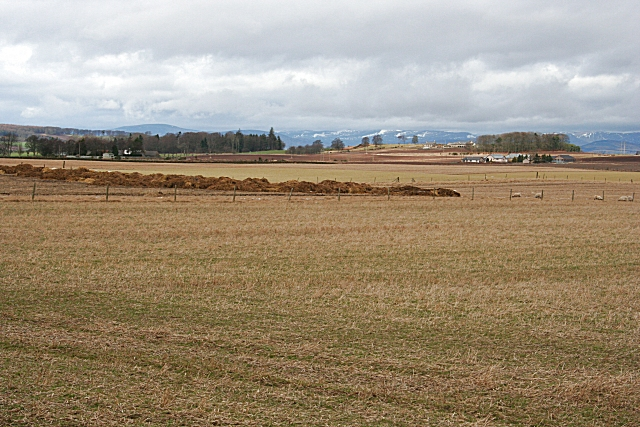
Fields near Kirkbuddo
