= Panmure Testimonial =

Coordinates: 56.528810°N 2.790035°W

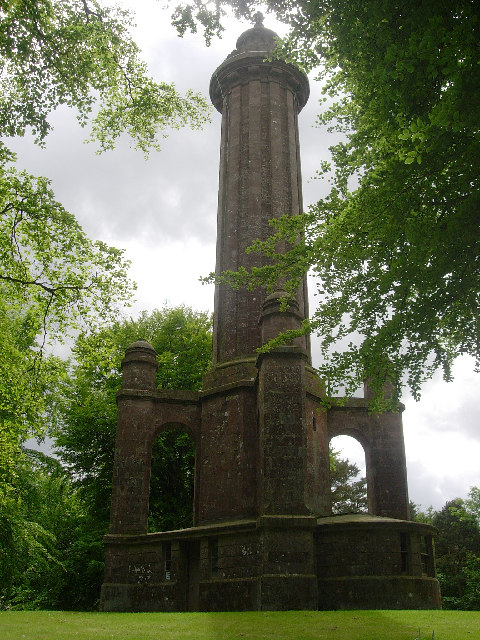
The Panmure Testimonial

The Panmure Testimonial, otherwise known as the Live and Let Live Memorial, is a monument in Angus, Scotland. It was erected in 1839 to commemorate the generosity of William Maule, the 2nd Earl of Panmure (later 1st Baron of Panmure) during the 'year of short corn' in 1826, a year in which an unusually hot and dry summer led to severe food shortages. In response, Lord Panmure suspended the collection of rent from his tenant farmers. The monument was paid for in full by the tenant farmers.

The monument was designed by architect John Henderson, and is protected as a category B listed building.

== Location ==
The monument was erected at the top of Camustone Hill, at the westernmost edge of Panmure Estate, at the end of an avenue of trees leading from Panmure House. The Camus Cross lies a quarter of a mile to the east on a mound in this avenue.

== Description ==
The monument is an octagonal pedestal flanked by arched buttresses and surmounted by circular fluted column balustraded above the capital and terminating in stone urn. It stands 105-foot (32 m) high.
