= Panmure House =

Former seventeenth-century country house in Angus, Scotland

Coordinates: 56°32′15″N 2°45′14″W

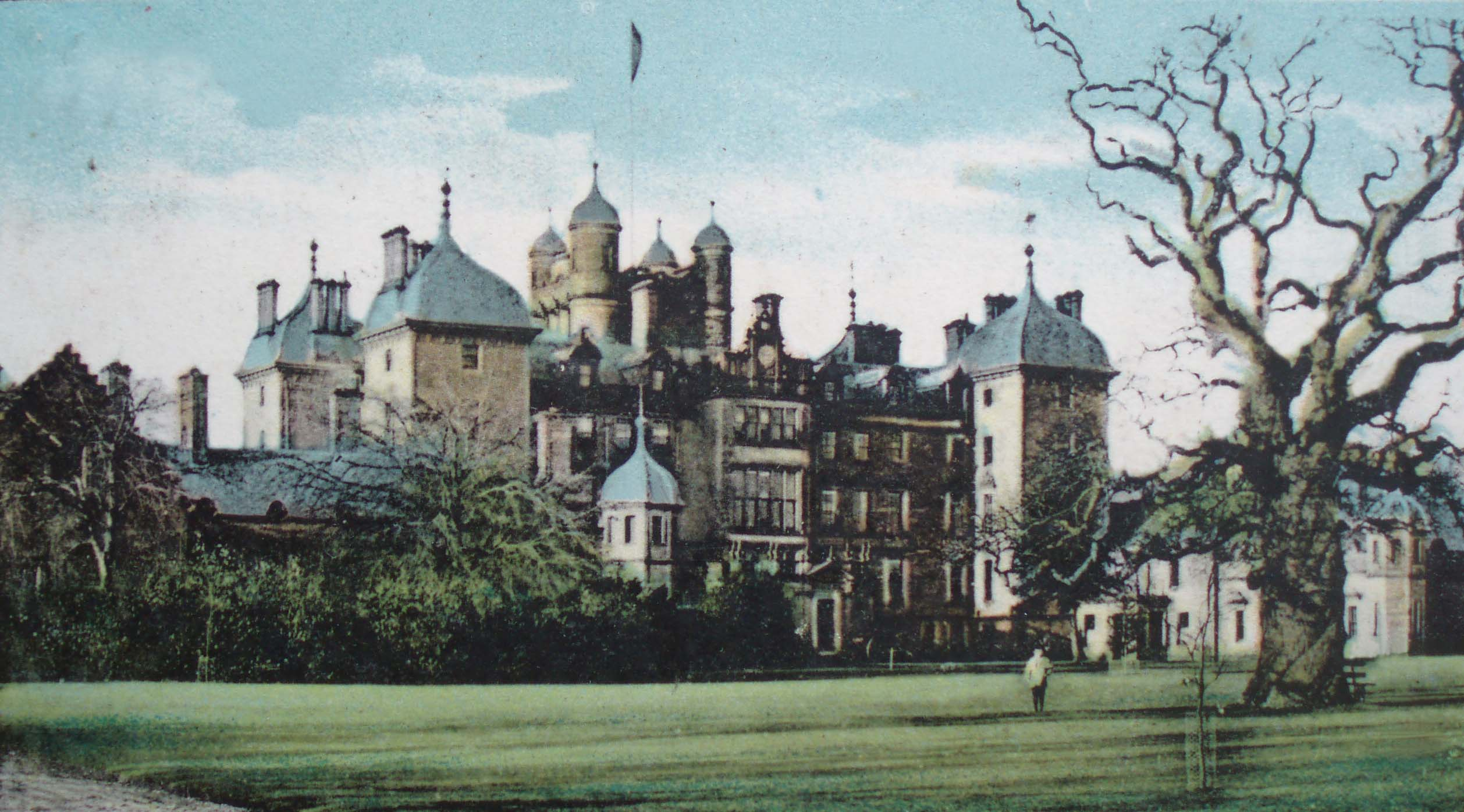
Panmure House

Panmure House was a 17th-century country house in the Parish of Panbride, Angus, Scotland, 4 miles (6 km) to the north of Carnoustie. It was the seat of the Earl of Panmure. It was rebuilt in the 19th century, and demolished in 1955.

== History ==
The Panmure estate was inherited by the Maule family in 1224, and the remains of Panmure Castle are located close to the site of the house. Panmure House was designed by the king's master mason John Mylne, although he died in 1667, before it was completed. The client was George Maule, 2nd Earl of Panmure (1619–1671). On Mylne's death, the work was continued by Alexander Nisbet, an Edinburgh mason, and the interior was fitted out by James Bain, the king's wright. Sir William Bruce was sometimes credited with the design in the past, and he did apparently advise the Earl after Mylne's death, but he only designed the gates and gate piers. After the death of the 3rd Earl, his son James, now 4th Earl, added the wings. The 4th Earl was deprived of his titles and estates after taking part in the Jacobite rising of 1715, although Panmure passed to his relatives, the Earls of Dalhousie. In 1852–1855, the house was extended on the instigation of Fox Maule, by the architect David Bryce in the Scottish Baronial style.

In what has been called "one of the greatest acts of officially-sanctioned vandalism of its type in Scotland", Panmure House was requisitioned by the army in the Second World War and heavily vandalised, it was then deliberately fired and its remnants demolished in December 1955. The Panmure Testimonial, a 105-foot (32 m) monument designed by John Henderson and erected in 1839 for William Maule, 1st Baron Panmure, remains on the estate, as does a stable block.

== Construction timeline ==
The construction of the Panmure House began in 1666. The main house was constructed from 1666 to 1670. The main structure of the building was composed of masonry. The roof, floor, windows and doors were installed by James Baine from 1668 to 1670. There are multiple accounts of the number of windows installed ranging from 67 to 100. The floor that was in the house was a broken jointed system which provided for a better finish than the other methods at this time. The roof structure was a coupled roof with rafters connected by collar beams and planking. The slating of the house took place from 1668 to 1670. Glazing took place from 1669 to 1670. The west gates were constructed of masonry in 1672. The stables were constructed between 1672 and 1675 along with the plastering of the principal rooms. Slating of the stables was done in 1675. Painting of the main house took place from 1671 to 1675. There was then a 10-year gap before the fitting out of the house took place from 1685 to 1686. This portion included washboards, paneling and lining, doors, mouldings, and architraves.
