= Loch Lee =

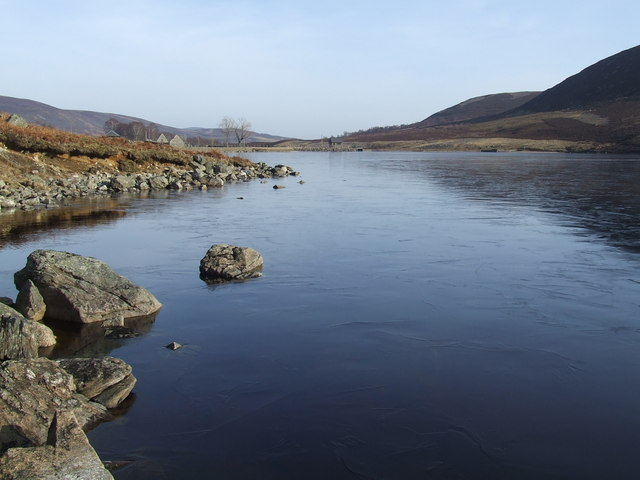

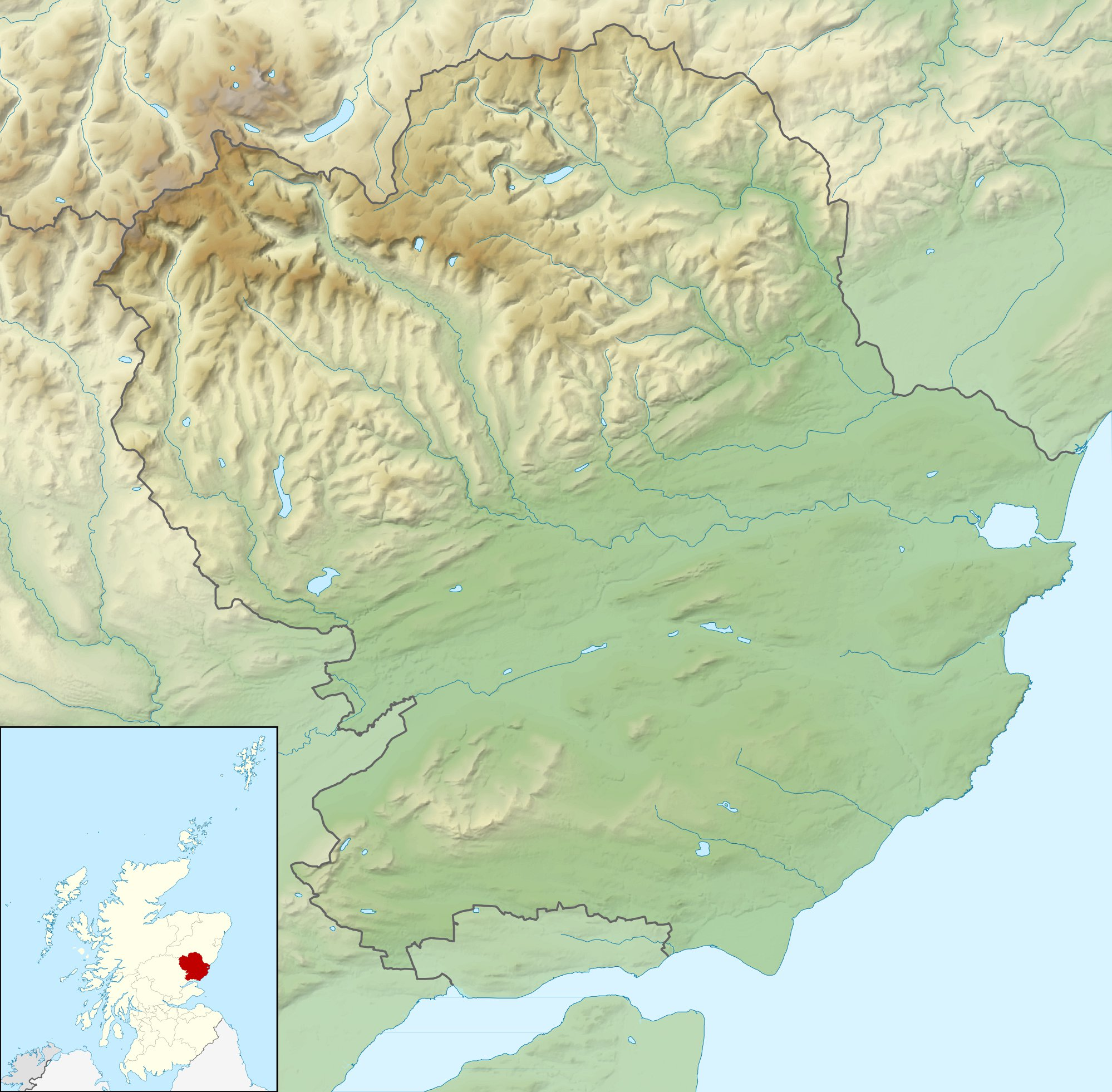
- Location within Angus
- Location: Angus, Scotland
- Coordinates: 56°54′N 2°57′W
- Type: loch
- Primary outflows: North Esk
- Basin countries: United Kingdom

National grid reference NO431800

Loch Lee is a loch in Angus, Scotland south of the Grampian Mountains that is fed by the Water of Lee and the Water of Unich and outflows, via the Water of Lee, to a confluence with the Water of Mark to form the River North Esk. Queen Victoria described it as "a wild but not large lake, closed in by mountains, with a farm-house and a few cottages at its edge".

The loch only supplies drinking water to the North Esk area.

The area is used by both walkers and anglers.

== See also ==
- List of reservoirs and dams in the United Kingdom
