= Hedderwick =

Hedderwick may refer to:

- House Of Hedderwick or Hedderwick Castle, a listed building in Montrose, Angus, Scotland
- James Hedderwick (1814–1897), Scottish poet, journalist and newspaper proprietor
- Mairi Hedderwick (born 1939), Scottish illustrator and author
- Thomas Hedderwick (1850–1918), Scottish politician
