= List of listed buildings in Montrose, Angus =

This is a list of listed buildings in the parish of Montrose in Angus, Scotland.

== List ==
Name	Location	Date Listed	Grid Ref. (Note: Sometimes known as OSGB36, the grid reference (where provided) is based on the British national grid reference system used by the Ordnance Survey. • "Guide to National Grid". Ordnance Survey. • "Get-a-map". Ordnance Survey.)	Geo-coordinates	Notes	LB Number (Note: Historic Environment Scotland assign a unique alphanumeric identifier to each designated site in Scotland, for listed buildings this always begins with "LB", for example "LB12345".)	Image
3-7 (Inclusive Nos) Melville Gardens, Victoria Villas, Including Boundary Walls And Railings				56°42′29″N 2°27′53″W	Category B	38210	Upload Photo
Eastern Road And Paton's Lane, Chapel Works Or Bond (Centre Buildings) To Paton's Lane				56°42′38″N 2°27′40″W	Category A	38212	Upload Photo
Eastern Road And Paton's Lane, Chapel Works Or Bond, East Warehouse				56°42′37″N 2°27′30″W	Category B	38214	Upload another image
17 Panmure Place, The Rectory, Including Boundary Walls And Gatepiers				56°42′31″N 2°27′58″W	Category B	38215	Upload Photo
Montrose Air Station Buildings 46 And 47				56°43′29″N 2°27′47″W	Category B	38227	Upload another image
81 High Street, Ivy House Including Boundary Walls				56°42′42″N 2°28′01″W	Category C(S)	38070	Upload Photo
95 High Street				56°42′41″N 2°28′04″W	Category B	38074	Upload Photo
High Street, Statue Of Joseph Hume				56°42′41″N 2°28′05″W	Category B	38089	Upload another image See more images
9 And 11 Castle Place				56°42′34″N 2°28′08″W	Category B	38094	Upload Photo
12 And 13 Castle Place Including Boundary Walls				56°42′34″N 2°28′08″W	Category C(S)	38097	Upload Photo
32 And 34 Bridge Street Including Boundary Walls				56°42′32″N 2°28′20″W	Category C(S)	38107	Upload Photo
40 And 42 Bridge Street, Including Boundary Walls				56°42′31″N 2°28′21″W	Category C(S)	38110	Upload Photo
Bridge Street, Post Office				56°42′34″N 2°28′14″W	Category B	38113	Upload Photo
14 South Esk Street, Former Melville Mission Hall				56°42′32″N 2°28′05″W	Category C(S)	38166	Upload Photo
1 And 2 Wharf Street, The Quarter Deck				56°42′25″N 2°28′28″W	Category C(S)	38168	Upload Photo
9-12 (Inclusive Nos) Wharf Street				56°42′25″N 2°28′25″W	Category C(S)	38172	Upload Photo
10 And 12 River Street, Tower At, Including Boundary Walls And Gatepiers				56°42′20″N 2°28′01″W	Category C(S)	38175	Upload Photo
8-11 (Inclusive Numbers) Union Place Including Boundary Walls				56°42′48″N 2°27′41″W	Category B	38181	Upload Photo
Bents Road, Montrose Ropeworks, Including Boundary Walls				56°42′45″N 2°27′38″W	Category C(S)	38182	Upload Photo
Baltic Street, Congregational Church And Memorial Hall Including Boundary Walls				56°42′38″N 2°27′56″W	Category B	38196	Upload Photo
1 Panmure Place Including Garage, Boundary Walls, Gatepiers And Railings				56°42′36″N 2°27′54″W	Category B	38198	Upload Photo
58 High Street Including Boundary Walls				56°42′45″N 2°28′07″W	Category B	38011	Upload Photo
80 High Street				56°42′44″N 2°28′07″W	Category B	38016	Upload Photo
96 High Street				56°42′43″N 2°28′08″W	Category B	38020	Upload Photo
100 And 102 High Street				56°42′43″N 2°28′07″W	Category B	38024	Upload Photo
118 And 120 High Street, 8 And 10 Hume Street				56°42′42″N 2°28′09″W	Category C(S)	38027	Upload Photo
170 And 172 High Street				56°42′39″N 2°28′07″W	Category B	38039	Upload another image See more images
180 And 184 High Street				56°42′38″N 2°28′07″W	Category B	38043	Upload Photo
214 And 216 High Street, Public Library Including Boundary Walls				56°42′36″N 2°28′09″W	Category A	38051	Upload another image See more images
51 And 53 High Street				56°42′44″N 2°28′04″W	Category C(S)	38065	Upload Photo
House Of Kinnaber - Doocot				56°44′51″N 2°26′54″W	Category B	17688	Upload Photo
Fisherhills, Kinnaber				56°45′01″N 2°26′39″W	Category B	17689	Upload Photo
Dubton House				56°44′11″N 2°29′12″W	Category C(S)	17745	Upload Photo
Borrowfield House				56°43′53″N 2°28′49″W	Category B	17746	Upload Photo
The Cottage, Hillside				56°44′29″N 2°28′56″W	Category B	17748	Upload Photo
Gayfield House, Hillside Walled Garden				56°44′29″N 2°28′42″W	Category B	17751	Upload Photo
30 And 31 Christie's Lane Including Boundary Walls				56°42′40″N 2°27′34″W	Category C(S)	46177	Upload Photo
49 - 71 (Odd Nos) Ferry Street				56°42′24″N 2°27′56″W	Category C(S)	46180	Upload Photo
26 High Street Including Boundary Walls				56°42′47″N 2°28′08″W	Category C(S)	46199	Upload Photo
21, 23 And 25 Murray Street Including Boundary Walls				56°42′56″N 2°28′02″W	Category B	46230	Upload Photo
109-113 (Odd Nos) Murray Street				56°42′50″N 2°28′04″W	Category C(S)	46236	Upload Photo
1, 3 And 5 Caledonia Street				56°42′26″N 2°27′57″W	Category C(S)	38221	Upload Photo
Montrose Air Station Building 48				56°43′27″N 2°27′47″W	Category A	38228	Upload another image
Montrose Air Station Building 151				56°43′31″N 2°27′45″W	Category C(S)	38232	Upload Photo
105 And 109 High Street				56°42′40″N 2°28′03″W	Category B	38077	Upload Photo
36 And 36A Bridge Street, Including Boundary Walls				56°42′32″N 2°28′21″W	Category B	38108	Upload Photo
14, 16 And 18 New Wynd				56°42′44″N 2°28′02″W	Category C(S)	38143	Upload Photo
28 - 33 (Inclusive Numbers) Wharf Street				56°42′25″N 2°28′20″W	Category C(S)	38173	Upload Photo
34 And 35 Wharf Street Including Boundary Walls, And Railings				56°42′26″N 2°28′19″W	Category C(S)	38174	Upload Photo
Dorward Road, Dorward House Including Gates, Gatepiers And Railings				56°43′01″N 2°27′33″W	Category B	38178	Upload Photo
4-7 (Inclusive Nos) Union Place Including Boundary Walls				56°42′47″N 2°27′41″W	Category B	38180	Upload Photo
3 Hudson Square				56°42′39″N 2°27′54″W	Category C(S)	38194	Upload Photo
1-8 (Inclusive Nos) Panmure Terrace Including Boundary Walls				56°42′39″N 2°27′53″W	Category A	38195	Upload another image
2 Panmure Place Including Boundary Walls And Railings				56°42′35″N 2°27′55″W	Category B	38200	Upload Photo
Charleton Road And Coronation Avenue, Ythan Lodge Including Ancillary Structures And Boundary Walls				56°43′38″N 2°27′51″W	Category C(S)	37987	Upload Photo
74 High Street				56°42′44″N 2°28′07″W	Category B	38014	Upload Photo
110-116 (Even Nos) High Street Including Boundary Walls				56°42′42″N 2°28′07″W	Category B	38026	Upload Photo
166 High Street				56°42′39″N 2°28′06″W	Category C(S)	38035	Upload another image
186 And 188 High Street				56°42′37″N 2°28′07″W	Category B	38045	Upload another image
Rosemount House Walled Garden				56°44′41″N 2°29′39″W	Category C(S)	17739	Upload Photo
44 Bridge Street Including Boundary Walls, Gatepiers And Railings				56°42′31″N 2°28′22″W	Category C(S)	46170	Upload Photo
Castle Place, Tourist Information Office Including Boundary Wall And Railing				56°42′35″N 2°28′11″W	Category C(S)	46171	Upload Photo
7 George Street Including Boundary Walls				56°42′35″N 2°28′04″W	Category C(S)	46183	Upload Photo
9 George Street Including Boundary Walls				56°42′35″N 2°28′04″W	Category C(S)	46184	Upload Photo
19 High Street Including Boundary Walls				56°42′47″N 2°28′04″W	Category C(S)	46189	Upload Photo
97 High Street, 1 Of 2 Houses In Review Close To Rear				56°42′41″N 2°28′02″W	Category C(S)	46195	Upload Photo
117 High Street And Queen's Close				56°42′40″N 2°28′02″W	Category C(S)	46198	Upload Photo
56 High Street Including Boundary Walls				56°42′45″N 2°28′08″W	Category C(S)	46201	Upload another image See more images
104 High Street Including Boundary Walls				56°42′43″N 2°28′09″W	Category C(S)	46204	Upload Photo
196 And 198 High Street				56°42′37″N 2°28′07″W	Category B	46205	Upload Photo
Market Street, St Margaret's Church (St Margaret's Roman Catholic Church) Including Presbytery, Boundary Walls And Gatepiers				56°42′49″N 2°27′59″W	Category B	46217	Upload Photo
20 Market Street And 22 Trades Close				56°42′49″N 2°28′00″W	Category C(S)	46218	Upload Photo
61, 63 And 65 Murray Street				56°42′54″N 2°28′03″W	Category C(S)	46233	Upload Photo
121-125 (Odd Nos) Murray Street				56°42′50″N 2°28′04″W	Category C(S)	46237	Upload Photo
58, 60 And 62 Murray Street				56°42′54″N 2°28′04″W	Category C(S)	46239	Upload Photo
37 North Esk Road, Including Boundary Walls, Gatepiers And Railings				56°43′03″N 2°28′02″W	Category C(S)	46247	Upload Photo
52 North Esk Road Including Boundary Walls				56°43′16″N 2°27′56″W	Category C(S)	46250	Upload Photo
Traill Drive, Traill Pavilion				56°42′44″N 2°26′54″W	Category C(S)	46254	Upload Photo
4 Upper Hall Street Including Boundary Walls				56°42′51″N 2°28′03″W	Category C(S)	46256	Upload Photo
1 Esk Road				56°42′13″N 2°28′50″W	Category B	44759	Upload Photo
Provost Scott's Road, St Mary's And St Peter's Episcopal Church Including Churchyard, Boundary Walls, Gatepiers And Gates				56°42′39″N 2°27′48″W	Category A	38204	Upload another image
Academy Square, Statue Robert Burns				56°42′37″N 2°27′49″W	Category B	38206	Upload another image See more images
1 Melville Gardens, Esk House Including Boundary Walls And Gatepiers				56°42′32″N 2°27′52″W	Category B	38208	Upload Photo
2 Melville Gardens, Park House Including Boundary Walls And Gatepiers				56°42′31″N 2°27′52″W	Category B	38209	Upload Photo
8-10 (Inclusive Nos) Melville Gardens Including Railings				56°42′28″N 2°27′54″W	Category C(S)	38211	Upload Photo
Dock Buildings, Old Custom House Meridian Street Including Ancillary Structures On Erskine Street, Ferry Street And Caledonia Street				56°42′21″N 2°27′54″W	Category B	38222	Upload Photo
Montrose Air Station Building 62				56°43′31″N 2°27′45″W	Category C(S)	38229	Upload Photo
Montrose Air Station Building 141				56°43′36″N 2°27′39″W	Category B	38230	Upload Photo
Montrose Air Station Building 142				56°43′31″N 2°27′45″W	Category C(S)	38231	Upload Photo
High Street, Two K6 Telephone Kiosks Adjacent To Town House				56°42′40″N 2°28′05″W	Category B	38233	Upload another image
83 High Street				56°42′42″N 2°28′04″W	Category C(S)	38071	Upload Photo
High Street, Mooran House, Including Boundary Walls				56°42′39″N 2°28′03″W	Category B	38081	Upload Photo
High Street, Town House				56°42′39″N 2°28′05″W	Category A	38083	Upload another image See more images
133- 143 (Odd Nos) High Street				56°42′37″N 2°28′05″W	Category B	38087	Upload Photo
5 And 6 Castle Place				56°42′34″N 2°28′07″W	Category B	38092	Upload Photo
10 Castle Place, Straton House Including Boundary Walls				56°42′33″N 2°28′06″W	Category A	38095	Upload Photo
31 And 33 Bridge Street				56°42′33″N 2°28′16″W	Category C(S)	38116	Upload Photo
59 - 63 (Odd Nos) Bridge Street				56°42′31″N 2°28′19″W	Category C(S)	38122	Upload Photo
53 And 55 John Street Including Boundary Walls, Railings And Lamp Standard				56°42′47″N 2°27′55″W	Category B	38133	Upload Photo
Provost Scott's Road, Links House Hotel And Ancillary Structures Including Boundary Walls And Gatepiers				56°42′46″N 2°27′51″W	Category B	38138	Upload Photo
10 And 12 New Wynd				56°42′44″N 2°28′02″W	Category C(S)	38142	Upload Photo
30 And 32 New Wynd				56°42′44″N 2°28′00″W	Category C(S)	38146	Upload Photo
South Esk Street, South Esk School Including Boundary Walls And Gatepiers				56°42′27″N 2°28′10″W	Category B	38165	Upload Photo
20 The Mall, Mall House Including Boundary Walls, Gatepiers And Railings				56°43′01″N 2°27′57″W	Category B	37990	Upload Photo
2 And 4 High Street And 128 Murray Street Including Boundary Walls				56°42′49″N 2°28′05″W	Category B	37996	Upload Photo
16 And 18 High Street Including Boundary Walls				56°42′48″N 2°28′06″W	Category B	37999	Upload Photo
54 High Street				56°42′45″N 2°28′07″W	Category B	38010	Upload Photo
92 High Street				56°42′43″N 2°28′07″W	Category B	38019	Upload Photo
156 High Street				56°42′39″N 2°28′07″W	Category C(S)	38032	Upload Photo
17 And 21 High Street				56°42′47″N 2°28′04″W	Category B	38056	Upload Photo
29 High Street And 1 John Street				56°42′47″N 2°28′04″W	Category B	38059	Upload Photo
Woodside Cottage, Charleton				56°44′31″N 2°27′13″W	Category B	19823	Upload Photo
Charleton Steading				56°44′28″N 2°27′44″W	Category B	17758	Upload Photo
10-20 (Even Nos) George Street				56°42′34″N 2°28′04″W	Category C(S)	46186	Upload Photo
High Street, Old Church Hall Including Boundary Wall				56°42′37″N 2°28′03″W	Category C(S)	46206	Upload Photo
4 And 6 John Street				56°42′46″N 2°28′03″W	Category C(S)	46210	Upload Photo
Melville Gardens, Melville Bowling Clubhouse Including Boundary Walls, Gatepiers And Railings				56°42′32″N 2°27′54″W	Category C(S)	46220	Upload Photo
Mid Links, Monument And Drinking-Fountain				56°42′52″N 2°27′43″W	Category C(S)	46223	Upload Photo
Montrose North, Signal Box				56°42′56″N 2°28′20″W	Category C(S)	46226	Upload another image
17 And 19 Murray Street				56°42′57″N 2°28′01″W	Category C(S)	46229	Upload Photo
33 And 35 Murray Street				56°42′56″N 2°28′02″W	Category C(S)	46232	Upload Photo
87, 89 And 91 Murray Street				56°42′52″N 2°28′03″W	Category C(S)	46234	Upload Photo
North Esk Road, Lochside Church				56°43′11″N 2°27′58″W	Category C(S)	46245	Upload another image
7 Union Street Including Boundary Walls				56°42′48″N 2°27′39″W	Category C(S)	46255	Upload Photo
The Limes And Limekilns Cottages				56°44′13″N 2°29′43″W	Category B	17742	Upload Photo
Hillside, Former Kinnaber Water Works				56°44′52″N 2°28′21″W	Category C(S)	51643	Upload Photo
10 Gibson Place				56°42′29″N 2°27′57″W	Category C(S)	38216	Upload Photo
69-77 (Odd Nos) High Street				56°42′43″N 2°28′03″W	Category C(S)	38068	Upload Photo
12 Bridge Street Including Boundary Walls And Railings				56°42′34″N 2°28′17″W	Category C(S)	38100	Upload Photo
22 Bridge Street Including Boundary Walls				56°42′33″N 2°28′18″W	Category B	38103	Upload Photo
24 Bridge Street Including Boundary Walls				56°42′33″N 2°28′19″W	Category C(S)	38104	Upload Photo
26 Bridge Street, Including Boundary Walls				56°42′32″N 2°28′19″W	Category C(S)	38105	Upload Photo
28 And 30 Bridge Street Including Boundary Walls				56°42′32″N 2°28′19″W	Category C(S)	38106	Upload Photo
71 Bridge Street				56°42′31″N 2°28′19″W	Category C(S)	38124	Upload Photo
111 And 113 Bridge Street				56°42′27″N 2°28′25″W	Category C(S)	38125	Upload Photo
121 Bridge Street				56°42′26″N 2°28′26″W	Category C(S)	38126	Upload Photo
129 And 131 Bridge Street				56°42′26″N 2°28′27″W	Category C(S)	38129	Upload Photo
1-11 (Odd Nos) St Mary's Road, Scott Terrace				56°42′36″N 2°27′57″W	Category C(S)	38149	Upload Photo
8 St Mary's Road				56°42′35″N 2°27′59″W	Category C(S)	38152	Upload Photo
4 Wharf Street				56°42′25″N 2°28′27″W	Category C(S)	38169	Upload Photo
1-6 (Inclusive Numbers) Wellington Place Including Boundary Walls And Gatepiers				56°42′51″N 2°27′41″W	Category C(S)	38179	Upload Photo
8, 9 And 10 Chapel Place				56°42′41″N 2°27′52″W	Category B	38187	Upload Photo
1 And 3 Panmure Street				56°42′40″N 2°27′54″W	Category C(S)	38189	Upload Photo
1 And 2 Hudson Square Including Boundary Walls And Gatepiers				56°42′39″N 2°27′54″W	Category B	38193	Upload Photo
12 High Street				56°42′48″N 2°28′06″W	Category B	37998	Upload Photo
28 High Street				56°42′47″N 2°28′06″W	Category B	38002	Upload Photo
50 High Street Including Boundary Walls				56°42′46″N 2°28′08″W	Category B	38007	Upload Photo
88 High Street				56°42′43″N 2°28′08″W	Category C(S)	38018	Upload Photo
150 And 152 High Street				56°42′40″N 2°28′07″W	Category C(S)	38030	Upload Photo
176 And 178 High Street				56°42′38″N 2°28′07″W	Category B	38042	Upload another image See more images
192 And 194 High Street				56°42′37″N 2°28′07″W	Category B	38047	Upload Photo
200 High Street Including Boundary Walls				56°42′37″N 2°28′08″W	Category C(S)	38048	Upload Photo
31 And 33 High Street				56°42′46″N 2°28′04″W	Category B	38060	Upload Photo
35 And 37 High Street Including Boundary Walls				56°42′45″N 2°28′04″W	Category B	38061	Upload Photo
Rosemount House				56°44′43″N 2°29′32″W	Category B	17738	Upload Photo
Rosemount House Stable And Office Block				56°44′44″N 2°29′38″W	Category B	17740	Upload Photo
Gayfield House, Hillside				56°44′32″N 2°28′45″W	Category B	17750	Upload Photo
Montrose Royal Mental Hospital - Main Building				56°44′47″N 2°28′46″W	Category B	17752	Upload Photo
Charleton Maternity Hospital Icehouse				56°44′24″N 2°27′36″W	Category C(S)	17756	Upload Photo
15C, 15D, 17 And 19 George Street				56°42′35″N 2°28′03″W	Category C(S)	46185	Upload Photo
24 John Street Including Boundary Walls And Railings				56°42′47″N 2°27′53″W	Category C(S)	46212	Upload Photo
28 And 30 The Mall, Cranes Meadow And The Gables, With Boundary Wall				56°43′05″N 2°27′58″W	Category C(S)	46214	Upload Photo
46 And 48 Market Street, The Albert Bar				56°42′45″N 2°27′59″W	Category C(S)	46219	Upload Photo
118 And 120 Murray Street				56°42′49″N 2°28′05″W	Category C(S)	46242	Upload Photo
New Wynd And Mill Street, Methodist Church				56°42′45″N 2°27′53″W	Category B	46244	Upload another image
33 North Esk Road Including Boundary Walls				56°43′02″N 2°28′02″W	Category C(S)	46246	Upload Photo
65 North Esk Road Including Boundary Walls And Railings				56°43′10″N 2°28′01″W	Category C(S)	46248	Upload Photo
East Links, Grey Harlings Including Boundary Walls				56°42′57″N 2°27′15″W	Category C(S)	46251	Upload another image
8 Panmure Place Including Boundary Walls And Gatepiers				56°42′34″N 2°27′56″W	Category C(S)	46252	Upload Photo
Eastern Road And Marine Avenue, Chapel Works Or Bond, Marine Avenue Mill And Front Office				56°42′36″N 2°27′38″W	Category B	38213	Upload another image
Railway Place, Caledonian House (Former Station) Including Boundary Walls				56°42′27″N 2°27′49″W	Category B	38220	Upload another image
63 And 65 High Street				56°42′43″N 2°28′03″W	Category B	38066	Upload Photo
119 And 121 High Street				56°42′39″N 2°28′04″W	Category B	38082	Upload Photo
145 High Street Including Boundary Walls And Gatepiers				56°42′37″N 2°28′05″W	Category C(S)	38088	Upload Photo
High Street, Statue Of Sir Robert Peel				56°42′36″N 2°28′06″W	Category B	38090	Upload another image See more images
3 And 4 Castle Place, Castlestead Including Boundary Walls And Railings				56°42′35″N 2°28′06″W	Category B	38091	Upload Photo
14 And 15 Castle Place				56°42′34″N 2°28′09″W	Category B	38098	Upload another image See more images
38A And 38B Bridge Street Including Boundary Walls				56°42′31″N 2°28′21″W	Category C(S)	38109	Upload Photo
47 And 49 Bridge Street Including Boundary Walls				56°42′32″N 2°28′17″W	Category C(S)	38120	Upload Photo
John Street, Parish Council Chambers Including Gatepiers				56°42′48″N 2°27′56″W	Category C(S)	38134	Upload another image
3 Chapel Street, Inverdyke House Including Boundary Walls And Gatepiers				56°42′46″N 2°27′57″W	Category C(S)	38136	Upload Photo
71 Mill Street Including Boundary Walls				56°42′44″N 2°27′52″W	Category C(S)	38139	Upload Photo
6/8 New Wynd				56°42′44″N 2°28′03″W	Category C(S)	38141	Upload Photo
West End Park And Western Road, Fragments Of Old Town Walls				56°42′33″N 2°28′20″W	Category B	38183	Upload Photo
29 Baltic Street And 2 Panmure Street				56°42′39″N 2°27′55″W	Category B	38191	Upload Photo
32 High Street				56°42′47″N 2°28′07″W	Category C(S)	38003	Upload Photo
64-68 (Even Nos) High Street				56°42′44″N 2°28′07″W	Category B	38012	Upload Photo
76 - 84 (Even Nos) High Street				56°42′44″N 2°28′07″W	Category B	38015	Upload Photo
158 High Street Including Boundary Walls				56°42′40″N 2°28′08″W	Category B	38033	Upload Photo
182 High Street, Ouchterlony House Including Boundary Walls				56°42′38″N 2°28′08″W	Category B	38044	Upload Photo
190 High Street, The Retreat, Including Boundary Walls				56°42′37″N 2°28′08″W	Category A	38046	Upload Photo
202 And 204 High Street				56°42′37″N 2°28′08″W	Category B	38049	Upload Photo
43 And 45 High Street				56°42′45″N 2°28′04″W	Category C(S)	38063	Upload Photo
Newbigging Farm House				56°43′41″N 2°29′47″W	Category B	17743	Upload Photo
Dubton Railway Bridge Over Borrowfield Road				56°44′16″N 2°29′15″W	Category C(S)	17747	Upload Photo
The Cottage, Hillside Coachhouse Stable And Groom's House				56°44′29″N 2°28′56″W	Category B	17749	Upload Photo
Montrose Royal Mental Hospital - Carnegie House				56°44′48″N 2°28′34″W	Category C(S)	17753	Upload Photo
Rose Cottage, Kinnaber				56°44′44″N 2°27′24″W	Category B	17761	Upload Photo
House Of Kinnaber				56°44′48″N 2°27′01″W	Category A	17762	Upload another image
House Of Kinnaber Walled Garden				56°44′47″N 2°26′58″W	Category C(S)	17763	Upload Photo
10,12 And 14 Murray Street				56°42′57″N 2°28′03″W	Category C(S)	45854	Upload another image See more images
Academy Square, Dean's Lamp				56°42′37″N 2°27′49″W	Category C(S)	46163	Upload Photo
67 Baltic Street, St George's Hall				56°42′37″N 2°28′03″W	Category C(S)	46166	Upload Photo
Blackfriars Street, St Margaret's Primary School Including Boundary Walls, Gates, Gatepiers And Railings				56°42′59″N 2°28′05″W	Category C(S)	46167	Upload Photo
1 Chapel Street				56°42′46″N 2°27′58″W	Category B	46176	Upload Photo
43 - 47 (Odd Nos) Ferry Street				56°42′26″N 2°27′57″W	Category C(S)	46179	Upload Photo
94 High Street				56°42′43″N 2°28′07″W	Category C(S)	46202	Upload Photo
98 High Street Including Boundary Walls				56°42′43″N 2°28′09″W	Category C(S)	46203	Upload Photo
139-143 (Odd Nos) Murray Street				56°42′49″N 2°28′04″W	Category C(S)	46238	Upload Photo
Railway Viaducts Over South Esk River				56°42′22″N 2°28′39″W	Category B	49864	Upload another image See more images
Panmure Place, Montrose Academy Including Boundary Walls And Gates				56°42′34″N 2°27′51″W	Category B	38207	Upload another image
91 High Street				56°42′41″N 2°28′04″W	Category C(S)	38073	Upload Photo
High Street, Montrose Parish Church (Church Of Scotland), Including Churchyard, Boundary Walls And Gatepiers				56°42′38″N 2°28′04″W	Category A	38084	Upload another image
Bridge Street, Montrose Infirmary, Including Ancillary Structures To North, And Boundary Walls And Gatepiers To Bridge Street				56°42′28″N 2°28′28″W	Category A	38112	Upload another image
51 - 57 (Odd Nos) Bridge Street				56°42′32″N 2°28′18″W	Category C(S)	38121	Upload Photo
65, 67 And 69 Bridge Street				56°42′31″N 2°28′19″W	Category C(S)	38123	Upload Photo
123 Bridge Street				56°42′26″N 2°28′26″W	Category C(S)	38127	Upload Photo
Rosehill Road, Rosehill Cemetery Including Lodges, Boundary Walls, Gatepiers And Gates				56°43′12″N 2°27′42″W	Category B	38130	Upload Photo
25, 27 Baltic Street				56°42′40″N 2°27′54″W	Category C(S)	38190	Upload Photo
Panmure Place, St Mary's And St Peter's Episcopal Hall				56°42′36″N 2°27′54″W	Category C(S)	38199	Upload Photo
Mid Links, Monument To Provost Scott				56°42′41″N 2°27′47″W	Category C(S)	38203	Upload Photo
146 High Street				56°42′40″N 2°28′08″W	Category C(S)	38029	Upload Photo
160-164 (Even Nos) High Street				56°42′39″N 2°28′07″W	Category C(S)	38034	Upload another image
23, 25 And 27 High Street				56°42′47″N 2°28′04″W	Category C(S)	38057	Upload Photo
Rosemount House West Lodge				56°44′41″N 2°29′47″W	Category B	17741	Upload Photo
Charleton Maternity Hospital Walled Garden				56°44′25″N 2°27′39″W	Category C(S)	17757	Upload Photo
39-47 (Odd Nos) Baltic Street				56°42′36″N 2°27′57″W	Category C(S)	46165	Upload Photo
97 High Street, 2 Of 2 Houses In Review Close To Rear				56°42′41″N 2°28′02″W	Category B	46196	Upload Photo
3, 5 And 7 John Street				56°42′47″N 2°28′04″W	Category C(S)	46207	Upload Photo
10, 12 And 14 John Street				56°42′47″N 2°27′57″W	Category C(S)	46211	Upload Photo
34 The Mall Including Boundary Walls And Gatepiers				56°43′07″N 2°27′58″W	Category C(S)	46215	Upload Photo
36 The Mall Including Boundary Walls And Gatepiers				56°43′08″N 2°27′58″W	Category C(S)	46216	Upload Photo
4 Meridian Street, Warehousing				56°42′19″N 2°27′58″W	Category C(S)	46221	Upload Photo
Mid Links, Hope Paton Bowling Clubhouse Including Railings				56°42′50″N 2°27′44″W	Category C(S)	46222	Upload Photo
Mid Links, War Memorial				56°42′48″N 2°27′45″W	Category C(S)	46224	Upload another image See more images
Mill Street, Knox's United Free Church, Hall And Session House Including Gates And Railings				56°42′46″N 2°27′52″W	Category B	46225	Upload another image
8 Mount Road Including Boundary Walls And Gatepiers				56°43′01″N 2°27′45″W	Category C(S)	46227	Upload Photo
21 Murray Lane				56°42′56″N 2°28′03″W	Category C(S)	46228	Upload Photo
27, 29 And 31 Murray Street Including Boundary Walls				56°42′56″N 2°28′02″W	Category C(S)	46231	Upload Photo
112 - 116 (Even Nos) Murray Street				56°42′50″N 2°28′05″W	Category C(S)	46241	Upload Photo
50 North Esk Road Including Boundary Walls				56°43′16″N 2°27′56″W	Category C(S)	46249	Upload Photo
36 And 37 Wharf Street, South Esk Inn And Railings				56°42′26″N 2°28′19″W	Category C(S)	46257	Upload Photo
Bow Butts, Former Bonded Warehouse				56°42′33″N 2°27′58″W	Category C(S)	51747	Upload Photo
Montrose Harbour, Inner Harbour Light				56°42′13″N 2°27′24″W	Category B	38223	Upload Photo
9 And 11 Bow Butts, Burness House, Including Gatepiers And Boundary Walls				56°42′34″N 2°28′00″W	Category C(S)	38226	Upload Photo
79 High Street				56°42′42″N 2°28′04″W	Category B	38069	Upload Photo
97 And 99 High Street (Excluding Separate Houses To Rear)				56°42′41″N 2°28′03″W	Category B	38075	Upload Photo
107 High Street With Boswell House, Including Boundary Walls				56°42′40″N 2°28′03″W	Category B	38078	Upload Photo
7 And 8 Castle Place				56°42′34″N 2°28′08″W	Category B	38093	Upload Photo
8 Bridge Street, The Elms, Including Boundary Walls And Railings				56°42′34″N 2°28′16″W	Category B	38099	Upload Photo
125 And 127 Bridge Street				56°42′26″N 2°28′26″W	Category C(S)	38128	Upload Photo
John Street, Former St Luke's And St John's Church And Hall Including Boundary Walls, Gatepiers And Railings				56°42′48″N 2°27′53″W	Category B	38132	Upload another image
6 Wharf Street				56°42′25″N 2°28′26″W	Category C(S)	38170	Upload Photo
Provost Scott's Road, Links Lodge Including Boundary Walls, Gatepiers And Railings				56°42′47″N 2°27′49″W	Category B	38184	Upload another image
5 Chapel Place Including Boundary Walls				56°42′42″N 2°27′51″W	Category C(S)	38186	Upload Photo
North Esk Road, Water Tower				56°43′13″N 2°27′58″W	Category B	37989	Upload another image
122-126 (Even Nos) Murray Street				56°42′49″N 2°28′05″W	Category B	37995	Upload Photo
20 High Street				56°42′48″N 2°28′06″W	Category B	38000	Upload Photo
40 And 42 High Street				56°42′46″N 2°28′07″W	Category B	38004	Upload Photo
44 And 46 High Street				56°42′46″N 2°28′07″W	Category B	38005	Upload Photo
1, 3 And 5 High Street				56°42′48″N 2°28′04″W	Category C(S)	38052	Upload Photo
15 High Street, Including Boundary Walls				56°42′48″N 2°28′04″W	Category B	38055	Upload Photo
47 And 49 High Street				56°42′45″N 2°28′04″W	Category C(S)	38064	Upload Photo
Kinnaber Ice House, Fisherhills, Kinnaber				56°45′02″N 2°26′40″W	Category B	17690	Upload Photo
House Of Hedderwick (Locally Hedderwick Castle)				56°44′05″N 2°29′21″W	Category B	17744	Upload Photo
Charleton Maternity Hospital				56°44′17″N 2°27′40″W	Category B	17755	Upload Photo
Charleton Old Farmhouse S.W. Of Steading				56°44′27″N 2°27′47″W	Category B	17759	Upload Photo
85 Bridge Street Including Railings				56°42′29″N 2°28′22″W	Category C(S)	46168	Upload Photo
133 And 135 Bridge Street				56°42′25″N 2°28′28″W	Category C(S)	46169	Upload Photo
Bents Road, Marine House, Former Hotel, Including Boundary Walls Gatepiers And Railings				56°42′44″N 2°27′16″W	Category C(S)	46178	Upload Photo
73 - 77 (Odd Nos) Ferry Street				56°42′23″N 2°27′56″W	Category C(S)	46181	Upload Photo
1, 1A And 3 George Street				56°42′36″N 2°28′05″W	Category C(S)	46182	Upload Photo
9 - 21 (Odd Nos) John Street				56°42′47″N 2°28′02″W	Category C(S)	46208	Upload another image
57 John Street Including Boundary Walls And Railings				56°42′48″N 2°27′54″W	Category B	46209	Upload Photo
1, 3 And 5 Lower Hall Street				56°42′51″N 2°28′06″W	Category C(S)	46213	Upload Photo
103 Murray Street				56°42′51″N 2°28′03″W	Category C(S)	46235	Upload Photo
Murray Street, Ymca Hostel				56°42′51″N 2°28′05″W	Category B	46243	Upload Photo
101 And 103 High Street Including Boundary Walls				56°42′41″N 2°28′03″W	Category B	38076	Upload another image
113 And 115 High Street				56°42′40″N 2°28′03″W	Category B	38080	Upload Photo
25 Bridge Street, Castlegait House Including Boundary Walls And Gatepiers				56°42′33″N 2°28′15″W	Category B	38114	Upload Photo
George Street And Baltic Street, St Andrew's Church (Church Of Scotland)				56°42′35″N 2°28′02″W	Category C(S)	38153	Upload Photo
Montrose Harbour, Old Pier				56°42′23″N 2°28′18″W	Category C(S)	38167	Upload Photo
Panmure Place, Natural History Museum Including Boundary Walls, Gatepiers, Gates And Railings				56°42′37″N 2°27′54″W	Category B	38197	Upload another image
6-10 (Even Nos) High Street Including Boundary Walls				56°42′49″N 2°28′07″W	Category C(S)	37997	Upload Photo
24 High Street				56°42′47″N 2°28′06″W	Category B	38001	Upload Photo
48 High Street				56°42′46″N 2°28′07″W	Category B	38006	Upload Photo
70 And 72 High Street				56°42′44″N 2°28′07″W	Category B	38013	Upload Photo
106 High Street				56°42′43″N 2°28′07″W	Category B	38025	Upload Photo
144 And 148 High Street				56°42′40″N 2°28′07″W	Category C(S)	38028	Upload Photo
154 High Street				56°42′40″N 2°28′08″W	Category C(S)	38031	Upload Photo
174 High Street (Holly House) Including Boundary Walls				56°42′39″N 2°28′07″W	Category A	38041	Upload Photo
208-212 High Street Including Boundary Walls				56°42′36″N 2°28′07″W	Category B	38050	Upload Photo
7, 9 And 11 High Street				56°42′48″N 2°28′04″W	Category B	38053	Upload Photo
Tayock Bridge Over Tayock Burn				56°43′20″N 2°28′42″W	Category C(S)	19822	Upload Photo
Charleton Lodge				56°44′10″N 2°27′21″W	Category B	17760	Upload Photo
1-5 America Street Including Boundary Walls				56°42′20″N 2°28′04″W	Category C(S)	46164	Upload Photo
Castle Street, Melville South Parish Church (Church Of Scotland) Including Boundary Walls, Gatepiers And Railings				56°42′30″N 2°28′16″W	Category C(S)	46175	Upload Photo
22 George Street, George Hotel				56°42′33″N 2°28′04″W	Category C(S)	46187	Upload Photo
Graham Street, The Hermitage Including Boundary Walls, Gates And Railings				56°43′07″N 2°27′54″W	Category C(S)	46188	Upload Photo
52 High Street Including Boundary Walls				56°42′46″N 2°28′07″W	Category B	46200	Upload Photo
108 And 110 Murray Street				56°42′50″N 2°28′05″W	Category C(S)	46240	Upload Photo
14 Panmure Place Including Boundary Walls				56°42′32″N 2°27′58″W	Category C(S)	46253	Upload Photo

== Key ==
The scheme for classifying buildings in Scotland is:

- Category A: "buildings of national or international importance, either architectural or historic; or fine, little-altered examples of some particular period, style or building type."
- Category B: "buildings of regional or more than local importance; or major examples of some particular period, style or building type, which may have been altered."
- Category C: "buildings of local importance; lesser examples of any period, style, or building type, as originally constructed or moderately altered; and simple traditional buildings which group well with other listed buildings."

In March 2016 there were 47,288 listed buildings in Scotland. Of these, 8% were Category A, and 50% were Category B, with the remaining 42% being Category C.

== See also ==
- List of listed buildings in Angus
