= Angus Council elections =

Local government elections in Angus, Scotland

Angus Council in Scotland holds elections every five years, previously holding them every four years from its creation as a single-tier authority in 1995 to 2007.

== Council elections ==
=== As a district council ===
Year	SNP	Conservative	Labour	Liberal Democrats	Independent
1974	0	9	3	0	10
1977	0	12	3	0	7
1980	5	11	2	0	4
1984 (Note: New ward boundaries.)	11	8	0	0	2
1988	13	6	0	1	2
1992	11	7	0	1	2

=== As a unitary authority ===
Year	SNP	Conservative	Labour	Liberal Democrats	Brechin Independent Group	Independent
1995	21	2	0	2	0	1
1999 (Note: New ward boundaries.)	21	2	1	2	2	1
2003	17	2	1	3	0	6
2007 (Note: Change to single transferable vote system and new ward boundaries.)	13	5	2	3	0	6
2012	15	4	1	1	0	8
2017 (Note: New ward boundaries.)	9	8	0	2	0	9
2022	13	7	1	0	0	7

== Results maps ==
1995 results map

1999 results map

2003 results map

2012 results map

2017 results map

2022 results map

== By-elections ==
=== 2007-2012 ===
Monifieth and Sidlaw By-Election 25 June 2009
Party	Candidate	FPv%	Count
Party	Candidate	FPv%	1
SNP	Jean Lee	68.6	2,486
Conservative	Craig Fotheringham	19.3	698
Liberal Democrats	Charles Goodall	12.1	439
SNP hold			
Valid: 3,623 Spoilt: 34 Quota: 1,829 Turnout: 3,657

Carnoustie and District By-Election 3 February 2011
Party	Candidate	FPv%	Count				
Party	Candidate	FPv%	1	2	3	4	5
Independent	Brian Boyd	40.27	1,252	1,290	1,370	1,454	2,113
SNP	Ed Oswald	41.46	1,289	1,302	1,346	1,426	
Labour	Ron Thoms	8.3	258	266	287		
Conservative	Eddie Wilmott	7.0	217	234			
Liberal Democrats	Charles Goodall	2.9	93				
Independent gain from SNP							
Valid: 3,109 Spoilt: 19 Quota: 1,555 Turnout: 3,128

=== 2012-2017 ===
Arbroath East and Lunan By-Election 28 November 2016
Party	Candidate	FPv%	Count					
Party	Candidate	FPv%	1	2	3	4	5	6
SNP	Brenda Durno	35.0	919	925	956	1,010	1,172	1,357
Conservative	Derek Wann	27.0	709	723	741	799	928	
Independent	Lois Speed	17.2	452	457	482	619		
Independent	Kevin Smith	11.8	309	315	352			
Labour	John Ruddy	6.7	177	191				
Liberal Democrats	Richard Moore	2.3	60					
SNP gain from Independent								
Valid: 2,626 Spoilt: 42 Quota: 1,314 Turnout: 2,668

Carnoustie and District By-Election 5 December 2016
Party	Candidate	FPv%	Count			
Party	Candidate	FPv%	1	2	3	4
Independent	David Cheape	43.5	1,401	1,420	1,477	1,737
SNP	Mark McDonald	32.1	1,033	1,043	1,078	1,117
Conservative	Derek Shaw	17.7	568	586	606	
Labour	Ray Strachan	4.4	141	151		
Liberal Democrats	Beth Morrison	2.3	75			
Independent gain from SNP						
Valid: 3,218 Spoilt: 28 Quota: 1,610 Turnout: 3,246

=== 2022-2027 ===
Arbroath West, Letham and Friockheim By-Election 25 April 2024
Party	Candidate	FPv%	Count				
Party	Candidate	FPv%	1	2	3	4	5
Conservative	James Cruickshanks	41.9	1,682	1,691	1,759	1,997	2,450
SNP	Kathleen Wolf	29.3	1,175	1,237	1,279	1,467	
Labour	Mark Hilton	16.0	644	676	833		
Liberal Democrats	Sandra O'Shea	8.3	333	375			
Scottish Green	Mark Findlay	4.4	176				
Conservative gain from Independent							
Valid: 4,010 Spoilt: 45 Quota: 2,006 Turnout: 4,055
