= Angus and Perthshire Glens =

UK Parliament constituency (since 2024)

- County constituency for the House of Commons
- Interactive map of boundaries from 2024
- Boundary of Angus and Perthshire Glens in Scotland
- Subdivisions of Scotland: Perth and Kinross, Angus
- Electorate: 77,006 (March 2020)
- Major settlements: Brechin, Forfar, Montrose

Current constituency
- Created: 2024
- Member of Parliament: Dave Doogan (SNP)
- Seats: One
- Created from: Angus, Dundee East, Dundee West, Ochil and South Perthshire and Perth and North Perthshire

Angus and Perthshire Glens is a county constituency of the House of Commons of the Parliament of the United Kingdom used since the 2024 general election. It elects one Member of Parliament (MP) by the first past the post system of election. Since 2024, the seat has been held by Dave Doogan of the Scottish National Party, who was MP for the predecessor seat of Angus from 2019 to 2024.

== Boundaries ==
As a result of the 2023 review of Westminster constituencies of the Boundary Commission for Scotland, the constituency covers northern parts of the Perth and Kinross and Angus Council areas.

It comprises the following:

- In full: the Angus Council wards of Brechin and Edzell, Forfar and District, Kirriemuir and Dean, and Montrose and District; and the Perth and Kinross Council wards of Blairgowrie and Glens, and Highland
- In part: the Angus Council ward of Monifieth and Sidlaw (to the west of the A90); and the Perth and Kinross wards of Strathmore (except for the Scone and District community council), and Strathtay (except Almondbank and surrounding communities)

The boundaries are very similar to the old North Tayside parliamentary constituency, which was a safe Conservative seat from its creation at the 1983 general election until being won by the SNP in 1997.

=== Wards ===
District	Ward	2020 electorate	Old seat
Angus	Kirriemuir and Dean	8,847	Angus
Angus	Brechin and Edzell	8,673	Angus
Angus	Forfar and District	11,870	Angus
Angus	Monifieth and Sidlaw (part)	625	Dundee East
Angus	Monifieth and Sidlaw (part)	3,930	Dundee West
Angus	Montrose and District	11,864	Angus
Perth and Kinross	Strathmore (part)	7,642	Perth and North Perthshire
Perth and Kinross	Blairgowrie and Glens	8,713	Perth and North Perthshire
Perth and Kinross	Highland	7,160	Perth and North Perthshire
Perth and Kinross	Strathtay (part)	4,583	Perth and North Perthshire
Perth and Kinross	Strathtay (part)	3,099	Ochil and South Perthshire

== Members of Parliament ==
Election	Member	Party
2024	Dave Doogan	Scottish National Party

== Elections ==
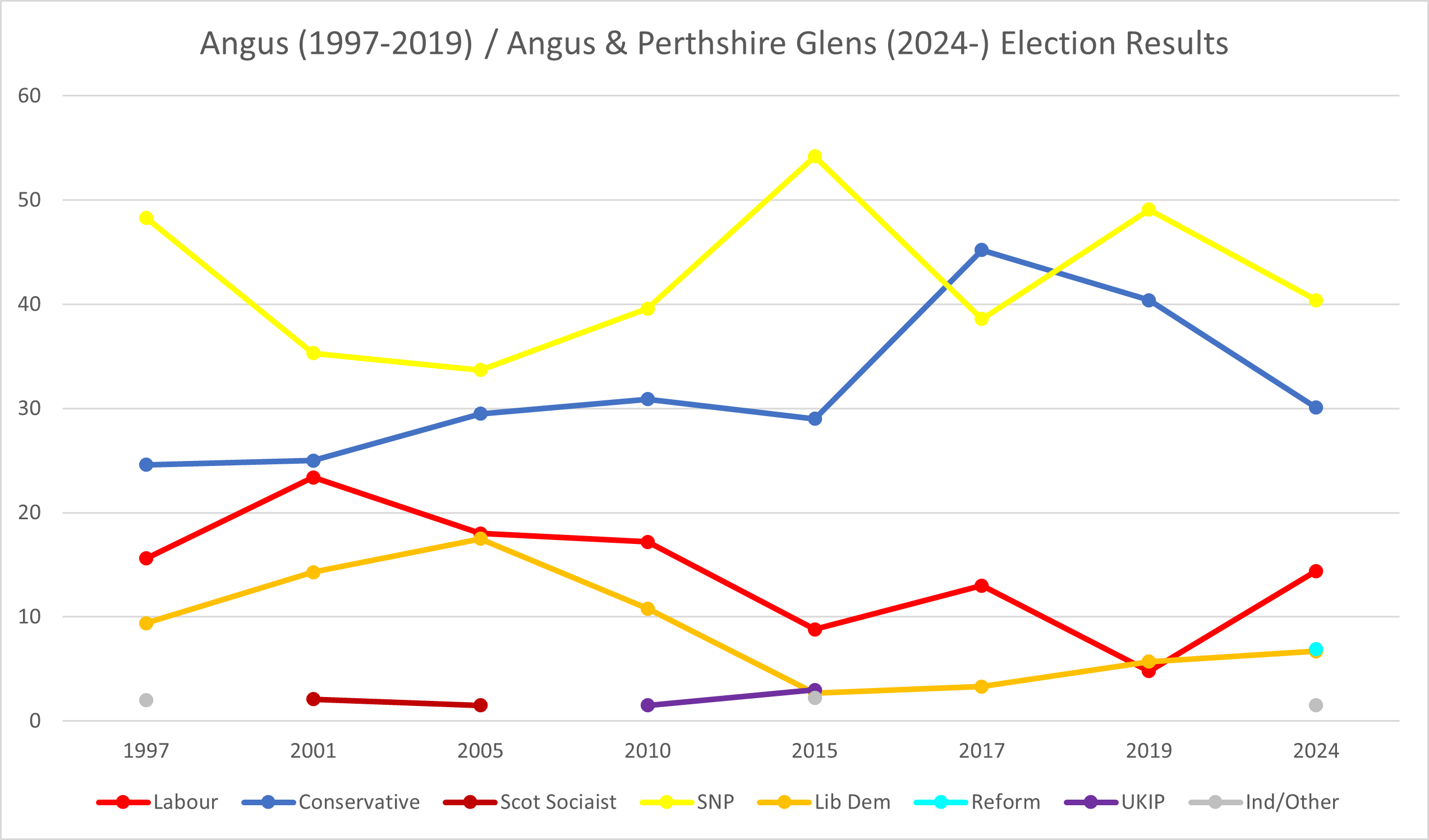
Angus (1997−2019) / Angus & Perthshire Glens (2024−) Election Results

=== Elections in the 2020s ===
General election 2024: Angus and Perthshire Glens
Party	Candidate	Votes	%	±%
SNP	Dave Doogan	19,142	40.4	−10.0
Conservative	Stephen Kerr	14,272	30.1	−9.7
Labour	Elizabeth Carr-Ellis	6,799	14.4	+10.2
Reform UK	Kenneth Morton	3,246	6.9	+6.3
Liberal Democrats	Claire McLaren	3,156	6.7	+1.7
Independent	Dan Peña	733	1.5	N/A
Majority		4,870	10.3	
Turnout		47,348	61.8	
SNP hold		Swing	−0.2	

=== Elections in the 2010s ===
2019 notional result (Note: Estimate of the 2019 general election result as if the revised boundaries recommended under the 2023 boundary review were in place)
Party	Vote	%
SNP	28,509	50.4
Conservative	22,504	39.8
Liberal Democrats	2,803	5.0
Labour	2,402	4.2
Brexit Party	329	0.6
Majority	6,005	10.6
Turnout	56,547	73.4
Electorate	77,006	
