= Arbroath and Broughty Ferry =

UK Parliament constituency (since 2024)

- County constituency for the House of Commons
- Interactive map of boundaries from 2024
- Boundary of Arbroath and Broughty Ferry in Scotland
- Subdivision: Angus, Scotland
- Major settlements: Dundee, Arbroath, Broughty Ferry

Current constituency
- Created: 2024
- Member of Parliament: Lara Bird (SNP)
- Seats: One
- Created from: Dundee East & Angus

Arbroath and Broughty Ferry is a constituency of the House of Commons in the UK Parliament. It was first contested in the 2024 general election. The seat is currently represented by Lara Bird, who was elected following the resignation of Stephen Gethins of the Scottish National Party on 14 May 2026 after being elected to the Scottish Parliament in the 2026 Scottish Parliament election.

The constituency name refers to the Angus town of Arbroath and the Dundee suburb of Broughty Ferry.

== Boundaries ==
Further to the 2023 review of Westminster constituencies, which came into effect for the 2024 general election, the composition of the constituency is as follows (as they existed on 1 December 2020):

- In full: the Angus Council wards of Arbroath East and Lunan, Arbroath West, Letham and Friockheim, Carnoustie and District; and the City of Dundee Council wards of North East and The Ferry.
- In part: the Angus Council ward of Monifieth and Sidlaw (to the east of the A90); and the Dundee City Council ward of East End (Douglas and Angus area) .

The Dundee City areas and the towns of Monifieth and Carnoustie were previously part of the abolished Dundee East constituency; Arbroath and surrounding areas were previously part of the abolished Angus constituency.

== Members of Parliament ==
Election	Member	Party
2024	Stephen Gethins	Scottish National Party
2026 by-election	Lara Bird	Scottish National Party

== Elections ==
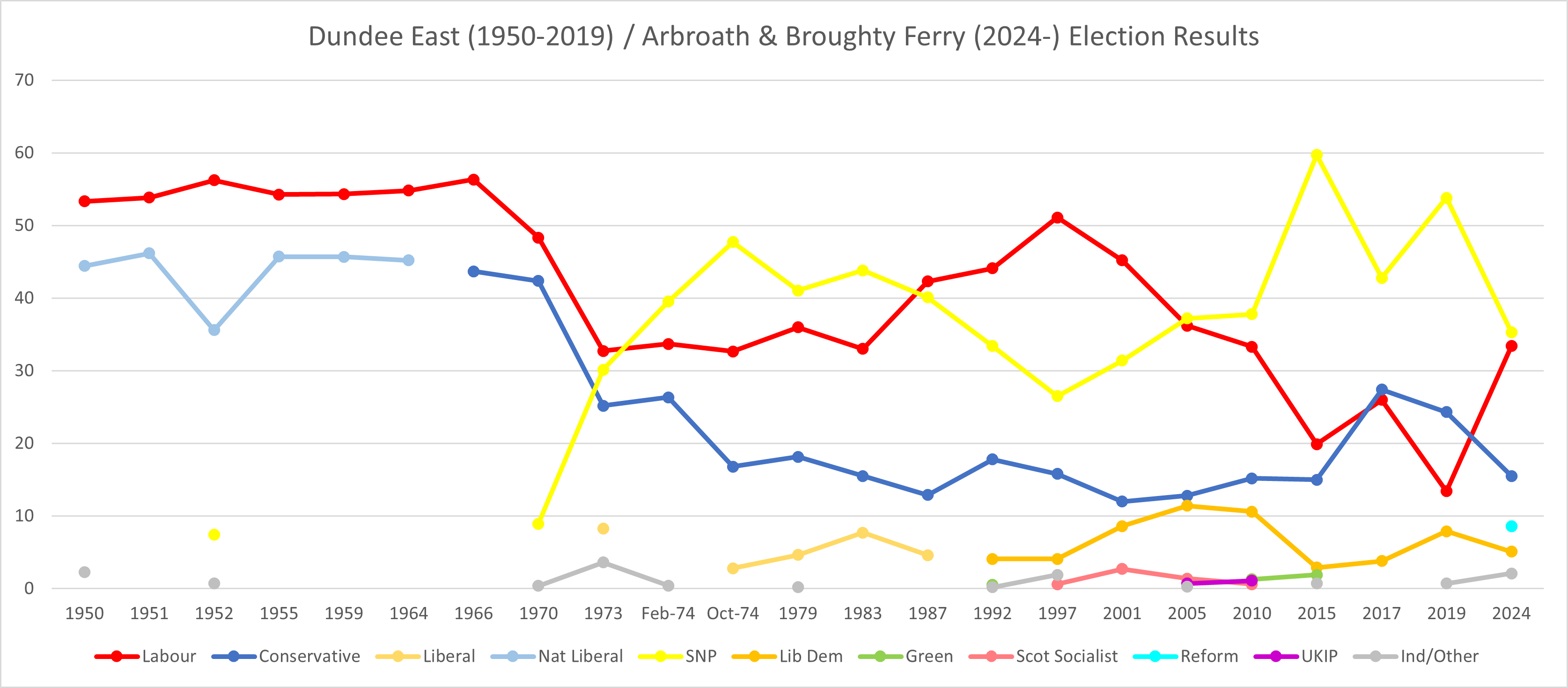
Dundee East (1950-2019) / Arbroath & Broughty Ferry (2024-) Election Results

=== Elections in the 2020s ===
2026 Arbroath and Broughty Ferry by-election
Party	Candidate	Votes	%	±%
SNP	Lara Bird	9,802	41.2	+5.9
Conservative	Jack Cruickshanks	4,524	19.0	+3.5
Reform	Bill Reid	4,341	18.3	+9.7
Labour	Heather Doran	3,651	15.4	−18.0
Liberal Democrats	Tanvir Ahmad	1,452	6.1	+1.0
Majority		5,278	21.8	+19.9
Turnout		23,770	31.3	−26.6
Rejected ballots		57	0.2	
Registered electors		75,985		
SNP hold		Swing	+1.2	

General election 2024: Arbroath and Broughty Ferry
Party	Candidate	Votes	%	±%
SNP	Stephen Gethins	15,581	35.3	▼15.6
Labour	Cheryl-Ann Cruickshank	14,722	33.4	▲23.2
Conservative	Richard Brooks	6,841	15.5	▼14.8
Reform	Gwen Wood	3,800	8.6	new
Liberal Democrats	David Evans	2,249	5.1	▼2.9
Alba	Ghazi Khan	693	1.6	new
Sovereignty	Moira Brown	231	0.5	new
Majority		859	1.9	▼
Turnout		44,117	57.9	–10.0
SNP hold		Swing	▼19.4	

=== Elections in the 2010s ===
2019 notional result (Note: Estimate of the 2019 general election result as if the revised boundaries recommended under the 2023 boundary review were in place)
Party	Vote	%
SNP	26,550	50.9
Conservative	15,773	30.3
Labour	5,321	10.2
Liberal Democrats	4,168	8.0
Independent	312	0.6
Majority	10,777	20.7
Turnout	52,124	67.9
Electorate	76,810	
