= Angus North and Mearns (Scottish Parliament constituency) =

Constituency of the Scottish Parliament

- County constituency for the Scottish Parliament
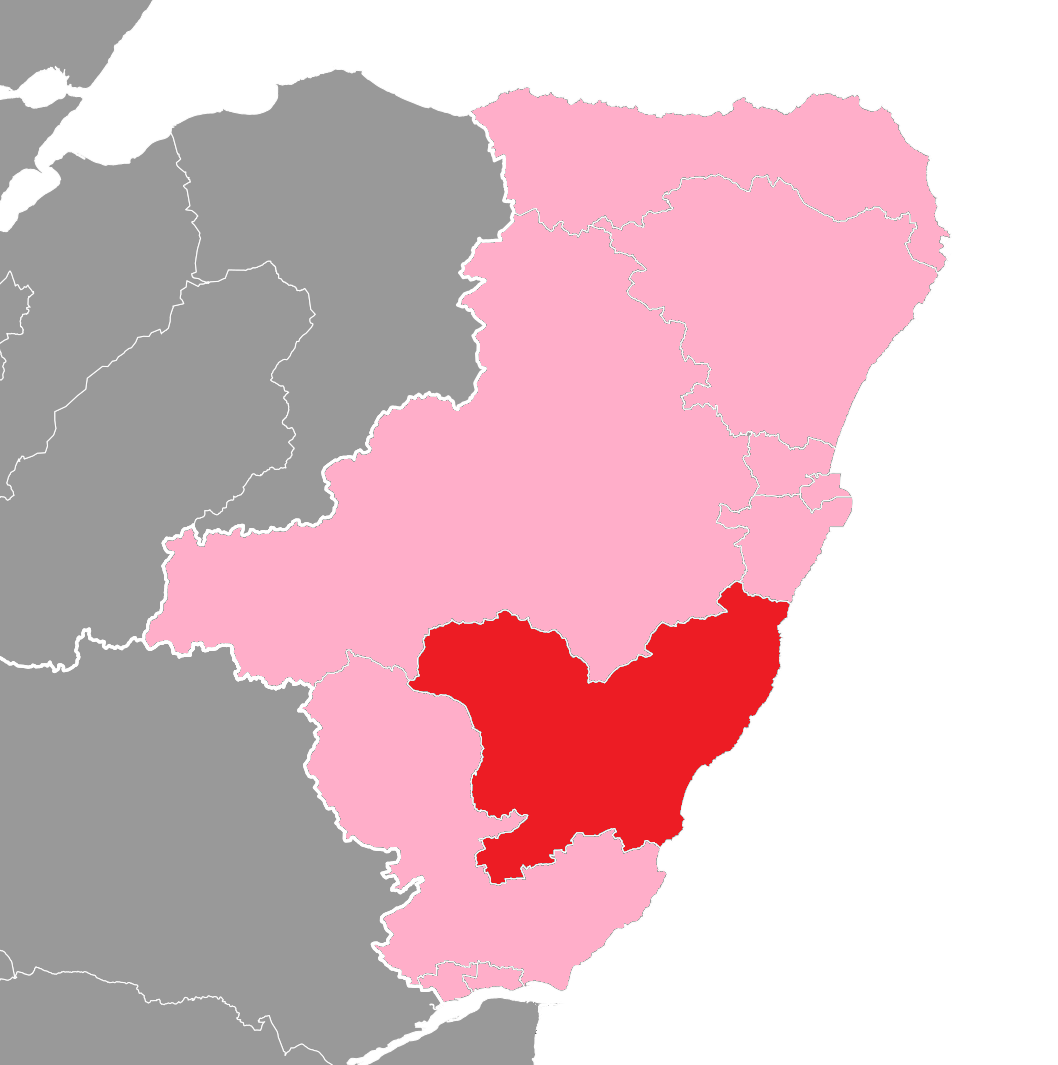

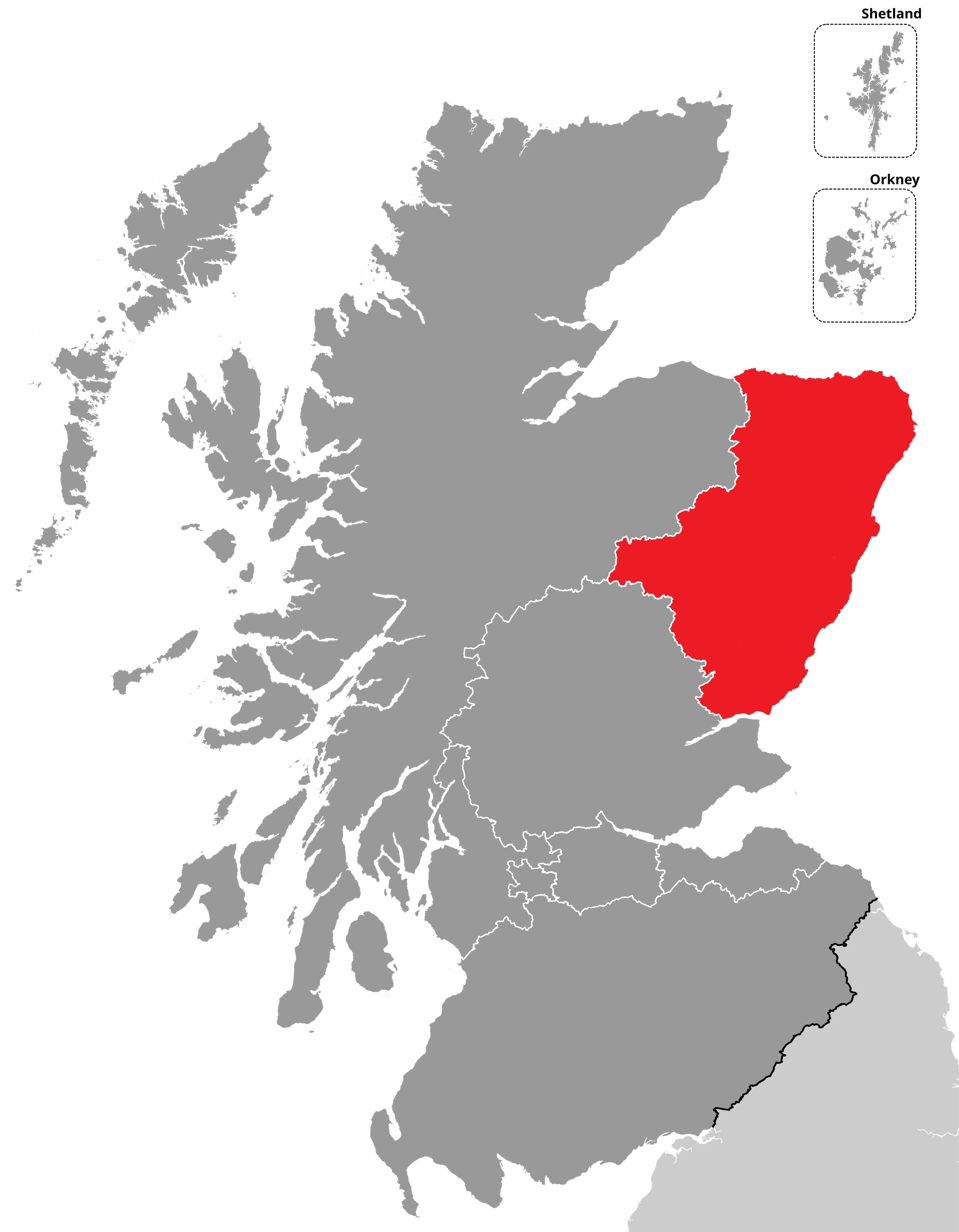
- Angus North and Mearns shown within the North East Scotland electoral region and the region shown within Scotland
- Electoral region: North East Scotland
- Electorate: 55,067 (2026)

Current constituency
- Created: 2011
- Party: Scottish National Party
- MSP: Dawn Black
- Council area: Angus; Aberdeenshire
- Created from: Angus, North Tayside, West Aberdeenshire and Kincardine

Angus North and Mearns (Gaelic: Aonghas a Tuath agus a' Mhaoirne) is a county constituency of the Scottish Parliament covering parts of the council areas of Angus and Aberdeenshire. Under the additional-member electoral system used for elections to the Scottish Parliament, it elects one Member of the Scottish Parliament (MSP) by the first past the post method of election. It is also one of ten constituencies in the North East Scotland electoral region, which elects seven additional members in addition to the ten constituency MSPs, producing a form of proportional representation for the region as a whole.

The seat was created for the 2011 Scottish Parliament election, and was held by Mairi Gougeon of the Scottish National Party from the 2016 Scottish Parliament election until 2026.

== Electoral region ==
The other nine constituencies of the North East Scotland region are: Aberdeen Central, Aberdeen Donside, Aberdeen Deeside and North Kincardine, Aberdeenshire East, Aberdeenshire West, Angus South, Banffshire and Buchan Coast, Dundee City East and Dundee City West. The region covers all of the Aberdeen City council area, the Aberdeenshire council area, the Angus council area, the Dundee City council area and part of the Moray council area.

== Constituency boundaries and council area ==
Map of boundaries from 2011

Angus North and Mearns covers parts of the council areas of Aberdeenshire and Angus. Angus is represented by two constituencies in the Scottish Parliament, the other constituency being Angus South. Aberdeenshire is represented by four other constituencies in the Scottish Parliament: Aberdeenshire East, and Aberdeenshire West are both entirely within Aberdeenshire; Aberdeen South and North Kincardine also includes a portion of the Aberdeen City council area; Banffshire and Buchan Coast also includes a portion of Moray.

Angus North and Mearns was created ahead of the 2011 Scottish Parliament election and covers areas that were in the seats of Angus, Tayside North and West Aberdeenshire and Kincardine by the first periodic review of Scottish Parliament boundaries. It remained unchanged following the second periodic review of Scottish Parliament boundaries. The constituency comprises the following wards of Aberdeenshire Council and Angus Council:

- Aberdeenshire:
  - Mearns (entire ward)
  - Stonehaven and Lower Deeside (shared with Aberdeenshire West)
- Angus
  - Brechin and Edzell (entire ward)
  - Forfar and District ((entire ward)
  - Montrose and District (entire ward)

== Member of the Scottish Parliament ==
Election	Member	Party
2011	Nigel Don	SNP
2016	Mairi Gougeon (née Evans)	SNP
2026	Dawn Black	SNP

== Election results ==
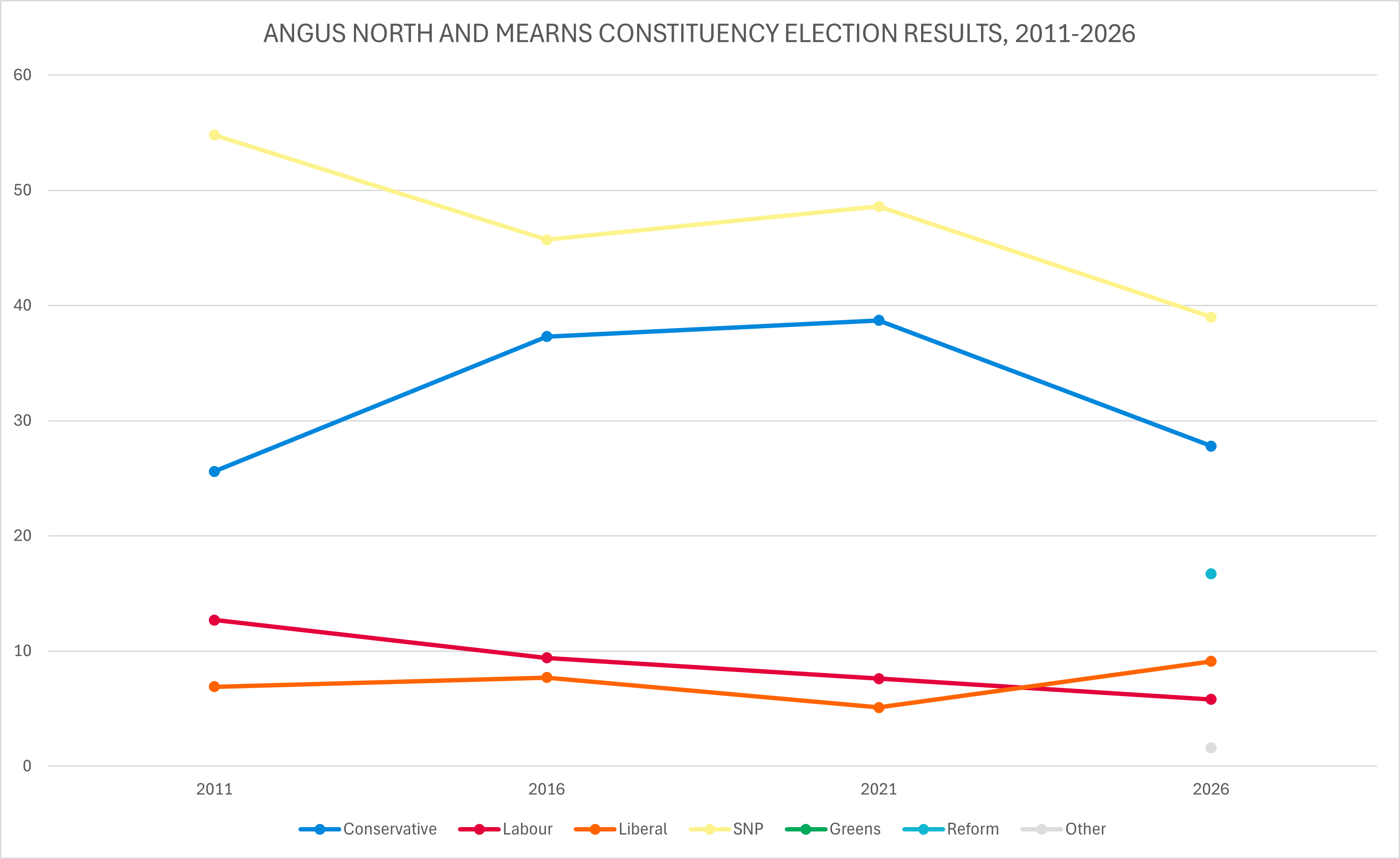
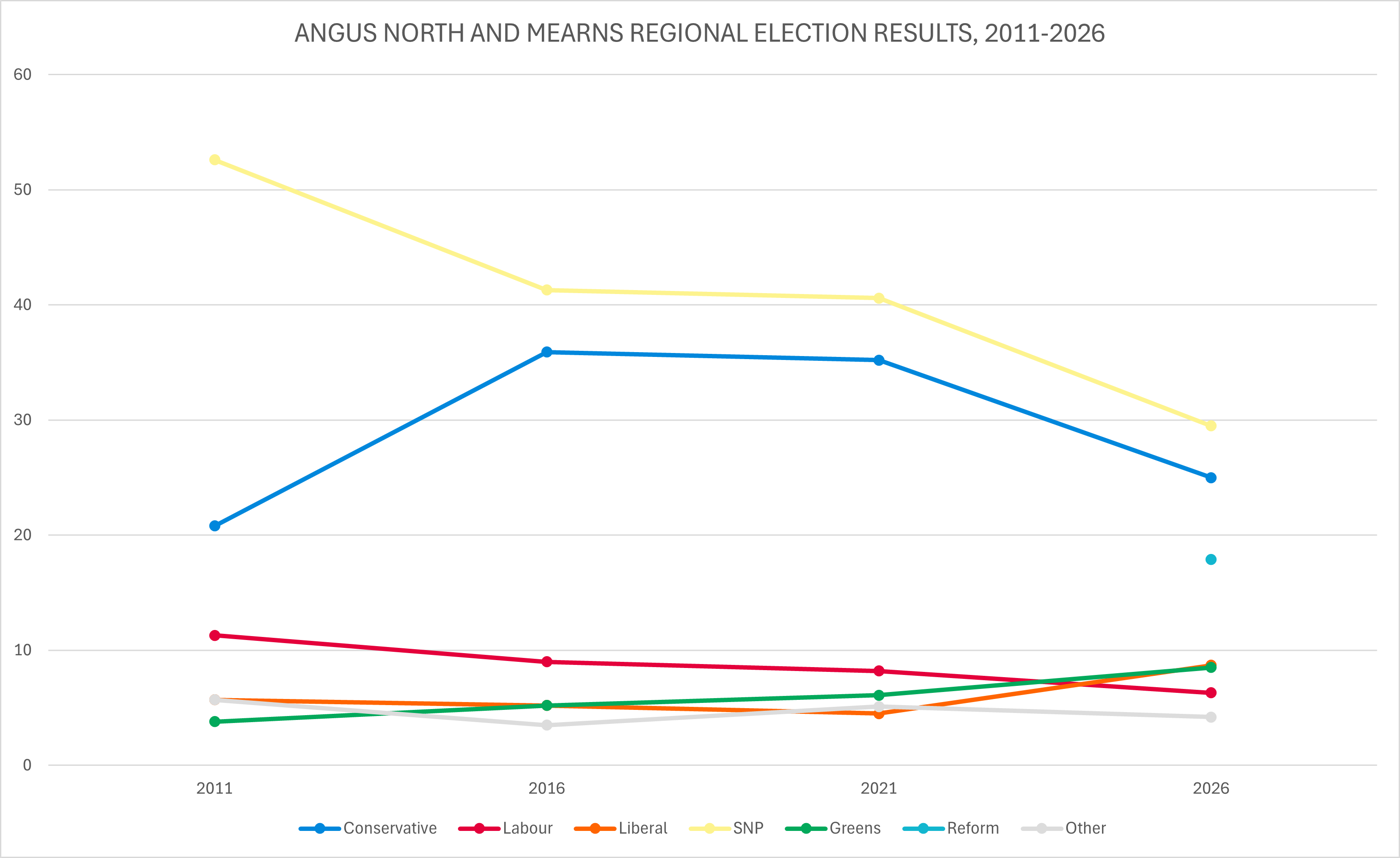

=== 2020s ===
2026 Scottish Parliament election: Angus North and Mearns
Party	Candidate	Constituency			Regional		
Party	Candidate	Votes	%	±%	Votes	%	±%
SNP	Dawn Black	11,308	39.0	▼9.6	8,590	29.5	▼11.1
Conservative	Tracey Smith	8,058	27.8	▼10.9	7,284	25.0	▼10.2
Reform	Laurie Carnie	4,844	16.7	New	5,205	17.9	▲17.7
Liberal Democrats	Martyn Knights	2,647	9.1	▲4.0	2,538	8.7	▲4.5
Green					2,482	8.5	▲2.4
Labour	Simon Watson	1,676	5.8	▼1.8	1,851	6.3	▼1.9
Independent	David Neill	468	1.6	New			
AtLS					233	0.8	N/A
Scottish Family					209	0.7	▲0.2
ISP					199	0.7	▲0.2
Independent Green Voice					193	0.7	▲0.2
Independent	Marie Boulton				150	0.5	New
Scottish Socialist					76	0.3	New
Workers Party					67	0.2	New
Independent	Iris Leask				44	0.2	New
Advance UK					35	0.1	New
Majority		3,250	11.2	▲1.3			
Valid votes		29,001			29,156		
Invalid votes		93			51		
Turnout		29,094	52.84	▼11.36	29,207	53.04	▼11.16
SNP hold		Swing					
Notes

Candidate or Party did not contest previous election

2021 Scottish Parliament election: Angus North and Mearns
Party	Candidate	Constituency			Regional		
Party	Candidate	Votes	%	±%	Votes	%	±%
SNP	Mairi Gougeon (Note: Incumbent member for this constituency)	17,144	48.6	▲2.9	14,360	40.6	▼0.7
Conservative	Braden Davy	13,635	38.7	▲1.4	12,451	35.2	▼0.7
Labour	Cindy Douglas	2,686	7.6	▼1.8	2,912	8.2	▼0.8
Green					2,151	6.1	▲0.9
Liberal Democrats	Michael Turvey	1,804	5.1	▼2.6	1,603	4.5	▼0.7
Alba					724	2.0	New
All for Unity					251	0.7	New
Scottish Family					191	0.5	New
Independent Green Voice					188	0.5	New
Abolish the Scottish Parliament					151	0.4	New
Reform					80	0.2	New
Freedom Alliance (UK)					77	0.2	New
Restore Scotland					63	0.2	New
Scottish Libertarian					56	0.2	0.0
UKIP					52	0.1	▼2.0
Independent	Laura Marshall				35	0.1	New
Independent	Geoffrey Farquharson				29	0.0	New
Renew					5	0.0	New
Majority		3,509	9.9	▲1.5			
Valid votes		35,269			35,379		
Invalid votes		114			41		
Turnout		35,383	64.2	▲10.1	35,420	64.2	▲9.9
SNP hold		Swing		▲0.8			

=== 2010s ===
2016 Scottish Parliament election: Angus North and Mearns
Party	Candidate	Constituency			Regional		
Party	Candidate	Votes	%	±%	Votes	%	±%
SNP	Mairi Evans	13,417	45.7	▼9.1	12,170	41.3	▼11.3
Conservative	Alex Johnstone (Note: Elected on the party list)	10,945	37.3	▲11.7	10,575	35.9	▲15.1
Labour	John Ruddy	2,752	9.4	▼3.3	2,663	9.0	▼2.3
Green					1,532	5.2	▲1.4
Liberal Democrats	Euan Davidson	2,265	7.7	▲0.8	1,522	5.2	▼0.5
UKIP					626	2.1	▲1.2
Scottish Christian					110	0.4	▼0.2
Solidarity					80	0.3	▲0.2
National Front					69	0.2	0.0
Scottish Libertarian					56	0.2	New
Communist					47	0.2	New
RISE					44	0.1	New
Majority		2,472	8.4	▼20.8			
Valid votes		29,379			29,494		
Invalid votes		117			40		
Turnout		29,496	54.1	▲5.2	29,534	54.3	▲5.3
SNP hold		Swing		▼10.4			
Notes

2011 Scottish Parliament election: Angus North and Mearns
Party	Candidate	Constituency			Region		
Party	Candidate	Votes	%	±%	Votes	%	±%
SNP	Nigel Don (Note: Incumbent member on the party list, or for another constituency)	13,660	54.8	N/A	13,114	52.6	N/A
Conservative	Alex Johnstone	6,374	25.6	N/A	5,195	20.8	N/A
Labour	Kevin Hutchens	3,160	12.7	N/A	2,828	11.3	N/A
Liberal Democrats	Sanjay Samani	1,726	6.9	N/A	1,431	5.7	N/A
Green					948	3.8	N/A
All-Scotland Pensioners Party					474	1.9	N/A
Scottish Christian					145	0.6	N/A
UKIP					237	0.9	N/A
Socialist Labour					145	0.6	N/A
BNP					187	0.7	N/A
Scottish Socialist					75	0.3	N/A
National Front					54	0.2	N/A
Solidarity					15	0.1	N/A
Angus Independents					43	0.2	N/A
Others					59	0.2	N/A
Majority		7,286	29.2	N/A			
Valid votes		24,920			24,950		
Invalid votes		88			102		
Turnout		20,008	48.9	N/A	25,052	49.0	N/A
SNP win (new seat)							

== See also ==
- North Angus and Mearns (UK Parliament constituency)
