= Kirriemuir and Dean (ward) =

- Angus Council
- Boundary of Kirriemuir and Dean in Angus from 2017.
- Electorate: 8,907

Current ward
- Created: 2007
- Councillor: Julie Bell (SNP)
- Councillor: George Meechan (SNP)
- Councillor: Ronnie Proctor (Conservative)

Kirriemuir and Dean is one of the eight wards used to elect members of the Angus Council. It elects three Councillors.

== Councillors ==
Election	Councillors		
2007	Iain Gaul (SNP)	Alison Andrews (Liberal Democrats)	Ian Mackintosh (Conservative)
2012	Iain Gaul (SNP)	Jeanette Gaul (SNP)	Ronnie Proctor (Conservative)
2017	Julie Bell (SNP)	Angus Macmillan-Douglas (Conservative)	Ronnie Proctor (Conservative)
2022	Julie Bell (SNP)	George Meechan (SNP)	Ronnie Proctor (Conservative)

== Election results ==
=== 2022 election ===
Kirriemuir and Dean – 3 seats
Party	Candidate	FPv%	Count					
Party	Candidate	FPv%	1	2	3	4	5	6
SNP	Julie Bell (incumbent)	29.3	1,321					
Conservative	Ronnie Proctor (incumbent)	21.3	962	965	1,007	1,072	1,126	1,856
Conservative	Euan Walker-Monroe	17.1	772	774	801	833	864	
SNP	George Meechan	12.7	574	728	740	792	990	1,007
Green	Ian Whyte	7.8	353	369	417	523		
Labour	Rachel Grieve	6.7	303	310	384			
Liberal Democrats	Sandra O'Shea	5.1	230	233				
Electorate: 8,907 Valid: 4,515 Spoilt: 81 Quota: 1,129 Turnout: 51.6%

=== 2017 election ===
2017 Angus Council election

Kirriemuir and Dean - 3 seats
Party	Candidate	FPv%	Count	
Party	Candidate	FPv%	1	2
Conservative	Ronnie Proctor (incumbent)	30.52%	1,397	
SNP	Julie Bell	27.09%	1,240	
Conservative	Angus Macmillan-Douglas	24.43%	1,118	1,319
SNP	Jeanette Gaul (incumbent)	9.02%	413	421
Liberal Democrats	Liz Petrie	4.50%	206	219
Labour	Gordon Watson	4.44%	203	211
Electorate: TBC Valid: 4,577 Spoilt: 117 Quota: 1,145 Turnout: 52.9%

=== 2012 election ===
2012 Angus Council election

Kirriemuir and Dean - 3 seats
Party	Candidate	FPv%	Count			
Party	Candidate	FPv%	1	2	3	4
Conservative	Ronnie Proctor	39.99	1,375			
SNP	Iain Gaul (incumbent)	37.84	1,301			
Liberal Democrats	Alison Andrews (incumbent)	12.48	429	691.9	717.7	
SNP	Jeanette Gaul	9.69	333	389.9	783.5	1,034.9
Electorate: 8,264 Valid: 3,438 Spoilt: 78 Quota: 860 Turnout: 3,516 (41.6%)

=== 2007 election ===
2007 Angus Council election

2007 Council election: Kirriemuir and Dean
Party	Candidate	FPv%	%	Seat	Count
Conservative	Ian Mackintosh	2,343	47.1	1	1
SNP	Iain Gaul	1,223	24.6	2	2
SNP	Christine Urquhart	544	10.9		
Labour	Derek David Ramsay	462	9.3		
Liberal Democrats	Alison Andrews	398	8.0	3	5
