= Mairi Gougeon =

Scottish Rural Affairs, Land Reform & Islands Secretary

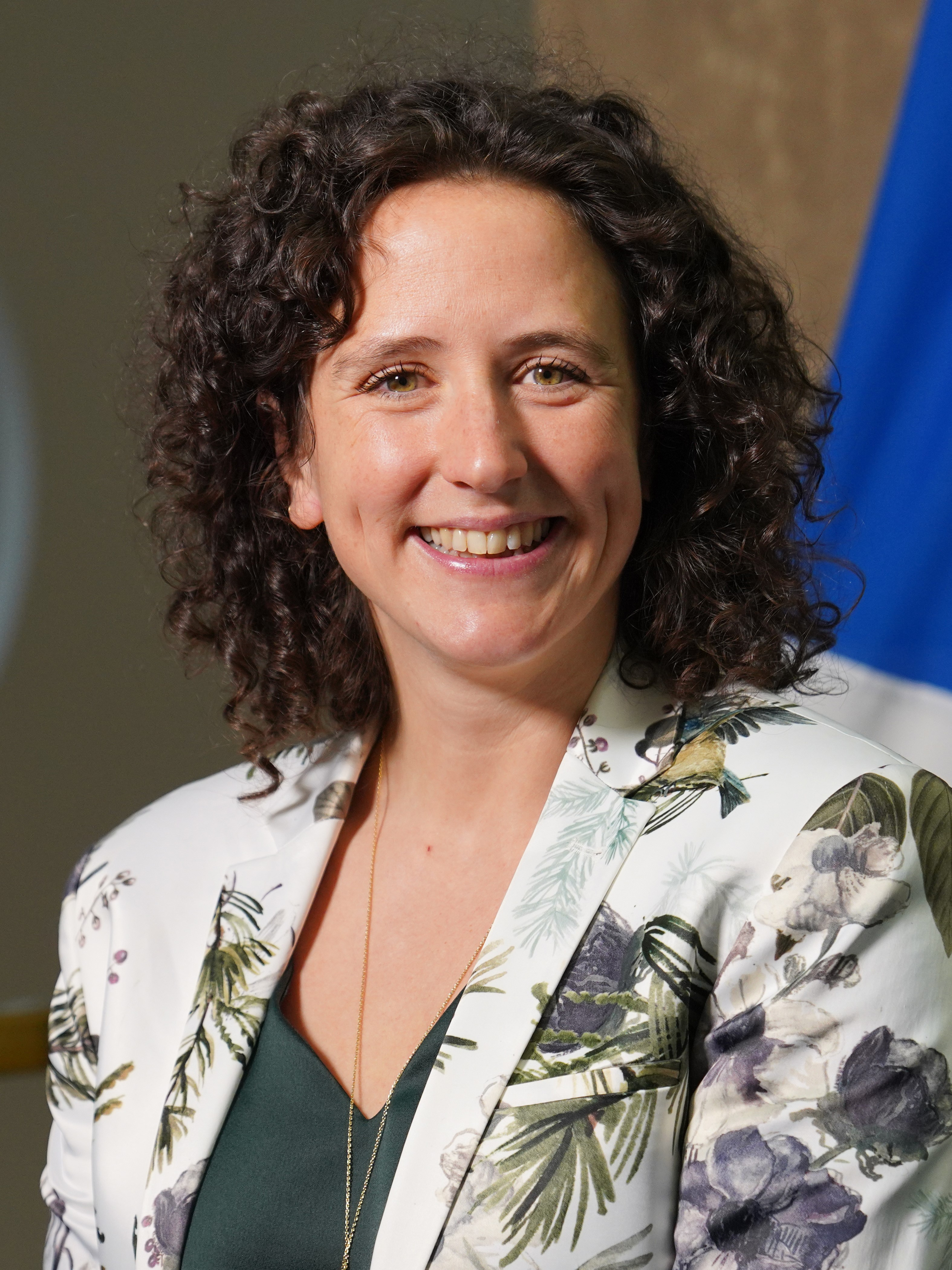
- Official portrait, 2023

Cabinet Secretary for Rural Affairs, Land Reform and Islands (Note: Cabinet Secretary for Rural Affairs and Islands from May 2021 until March 2023.)
- In office 19 May 2021 – 20 May 2026
- First Minister: Nicola Sturgeon; Humza Yousaf; John Swinney
- Preceded by: Fergus Ewing
- Succeeded by: Gillian Martin

Minister for Public Health and Sport
- In office 21 December 2020 – 19 May 2021
- First Minister: Nicola Sturgeon
- Preceded by: Joe FitzPatrick
- Succeeded by: Maree Todd

Minister for Rural Affairs and the Natural Environment
- In office 27 June 2018 – 21 December 2020
- First Minister: Nicola Sturgeon
- Preceded by: Office established
- Succeeded by: Ben Macpherson

Member of the Scottish Parliament for Angus North and Mearns
- In office 6 May 2016 – 9 April 2026
- Preceded by: Nigel Don
- Succeeded by: Dawn Black

Personal details
- Born: Mairi Evans; 23 April 1985 (age 41) Brechin, Angus, Scotland
- Party: Scottish National Party
- Education: University of Aberdeen

Mairi Angela Gougeon (née Evans; born 23 April 1985) is a Scottish politician who served as Cabinet Secretary for Rural Affairs, Land Reform and Islands from 2021 to 2026. A member of the Scottish National Party (SNP), she served as the Member of the Scottish Parliament (MSP) for Angus North and Mearns from 2016 to 2026.

A graduate of the University of Aberdeen, Gougeon was elected to the Angus Council in the 2007 Scottish local elections. She represented the Brechin and Edzell ward and was the council's spokesperson on economic development. She stood down in the 2017 election, following her election to the Scottish Parliament the previous year.

In 2018, she was appointed Minister for Rural Affairs and the Natural Environment, before being appointed Minister for Public Health and Sport in 2020. Gougeon was re-elected in 2021 and was promoted by First Minister Nicola Sturgeon to the Scottish Cabinet as Cabinet Secretary for Rural Affairs and Islands; she was re-appointed by new First Minister Humza Yousaf in 2023, while also gaining the land reform portfolio. She stood down as an MSP at the 2026 election.

== Early life ==
=== Education and early career ===
Mairi Angela Evans was born on 23 April 1985 in Brechin in Angus. She was educated at Kilgraston School where she had a scholarship. She attended the University of Aberdeen from 2003 to 2007, graduating with a Master of Arts in history. From 2002 to 2010, she worked as Senior Assistant in the National Trust for Scotland.

=== Early political years ===
After graduating from university, Gougeon was elected to Angus Council in the 2007 council election, representing the Brechin and Edzell ward. She became convener of infrastructure services, then later the development and enterprise convener.

Gougeon was re-elected in 2012 election. She was a member of Angus Council, which caused the eviction of 20 families from South Links Caravan Park, Montrose in 2015, following an inward investment decision in 2011, granting a third party an unsecured loan of £275,000.

Gougeon was chairwoman of the East of Scotland European Consortium. She did some political work in Brussels. She represented Convention of Scottish Local Authorities (COSLA) on the executive of the Council of European Municipalities and Regions (CEMR). She resigned as a councillor in 2017, following her election to the Scottish Parliament.

== Member of the Scottish Parliament ==
In August 2015, Gougeon was selected to be the SNP candidate for the Angus North and Mearns constituency at the 2016 Scottish Parliament election, replacing the incumbent MSP Nigel Don. On 6 May 2016, she was elected to the Scottish Parliament and was sworn in on 13 May.

=== Junior minister ===
She was appointed Minister for Rural Affairs and the Natural Environment in June 2018. In December 2020, she succeeded Joe FitzPatrick as Minister for Public Health and Sport after he had resigned due to an increase in drug deaths in Scotland.

=== Cabinet Secretary for Rural Affairs and Islands ===
At the May 2021 Scottish Parliament election, Gougeon was re-elected as the MSP for Angus North and Mearns. On 19 May 2021, she was promoted to the Scottish Cabinet, as Cabinet Secretary for Rural Affairs and Islands in Nicola Sturgeon's new government.

On 14 March 2025, she announced she would stand down at the 2026 Scottish Parliament election.

In September 2025, Gougeon wrote to the Convener of the Rural Affairs and Islands Committee committing the Scottish Government to introducing official guidance on the welfare of farmed fish under the Animal Health and Welfare (Scotland) Act 2006.

== Personal life ==
Gougeon married Paris-born Baptiste Gougeon in July 2017.

== Footnotes ==
Political offices
New office	Minister for Rural Affairs and the Natural Environment; 2018–2020	Succeeded by Ben Macpherson
Preceded by Joe FitzPatrick	Minister for Public Health and Sport; 2020–2021	Succeeded by Maree Todd
Preceded by Fergus Ewing as Cabinet Secretary for Rural Economy and Tourism	Cabinet Secretary for Rural Affairs and Islands; 2021–2026	Succeeded by Role abolished
Scottish Parliament
Preceded by Nigel Don	Member of the Scottish Parliament for Angus North and Mearns; 2016–2026	Succeeded by Dawn Black
