= Montrose and District (ward) =

Location of the ward

Montrose and District is one of the eight wards of Scotland used to elect members of the Angus Council. It elects four Councillors.

== Councillors ==
Election	Councillors			
2007	David May (Liberal Democrats)	Sandy West (SNP)	Paul Valentine (SNP)	Mark Salmond (Ind.)
2012	David May (Liberal Democrats)	Bill Duff (SNP)	Paul Valentine (SNP)	Mark Salmond (Ind.)
2017	Tommy Stewart (Ind.)	Bill Duff (SNP)	Ron Sturrock (Conservative)	Mark Salmond (Ind.)
2022	Tommy Stewart (Ind.)	Bill Duff (SNP)	Iain Gall (Conservative)	Kenny Braes (SNP)

== Election results ==
=== 2022 election ===
Montrose and District – 4 seats
Party	Candidate	FPv%	Count								
Party	Candidate	FPv%	1	2	3	4	5	6	7	8	9
Conservative	Iain Gall	22.3	1,124								
SNP	Kenny Braes (Note: Sitting councillor for Brechin and Edzell.)	21.6	1,090								
SNP	Bill Duff (incumbent)	17.7	894	896	966	972	976	1,059			
Independent	Tommy Stewart (incumbent)	14.5	732	749	750	763	784	808	815	903	1,377
Independent	Mark Salmond (incumbent)	9.9	499	532	534	554	587	612	620	729	
Labour	John Ruddy	6.5	330	341	342	344	392	426	433		
Green	Jamie Adams	3.6	180	183	185	192	209				
Liberal Democrats	Angela Noble	2.7	139	154	155	163					
Independent	James Boag	1.2	61	66	66						
Electorate: 12,016 Valid: 5,049 Spoilt: 84 Quota: 1,010 Turnout: 42.7%

=== 2017 election ===
2017 Angus Council election

Montrose and District - 4 seats
Party	Candidate	FPv%	Count					
Party	Candidate	FPv%	1	2	3	4	5	6
Conservative	Ron Sturrock	27.9%	1,375					
SNP	Bill Duff (incumbent)	23.2%	1,142					
Independent	Mark Salmond (incumbent)	13.9%	687	797	809	867	983	1,175
Independent	Tommy Stewart	13.2%	653	727	732	770	852	1,011
SNP	Gill Stranock	11.6%	570	574	692	715	768	
Labour	Pamela Ruddy	6.6%	323	358	365	428		
Liberal Democrats	Avril Simpson	1.7%	178	240	242			
Electorate: 12,058 Valid: 4,928 Spoilt: 88 Quota: 986 Turnout: 41.6%

=== 2012 election ===
2012 Angus Council election

Montrose and District - 4 seats
Party	Candidate	FPv%	Count					
Party	Candidate	FPv%	1	2	3	4	5	6
Independent	Mark Salmond (incumbent)	22.61%	891					
SNP	Bill Duff	20.69%	815					
SNP	Paul Michael Valentine (incumbent)	18.43%	726	743.1	764.1	821.1		
Liberal Democrats	David May (incumbent)	16.29%	642	678.2	680.9	757.7	765.1	1,119.2
Conservative	Andrew Boyd	14.37%	566	588.9	589.6	617	621.2	
Labour	Ina Paton	7.61%	300	308.4	309.1			
Electorate: 11,434 Valid: 3,940 Spoilt: 54 Quota: 789 Turnout: 3,994 (34.46%)

=== 2007 election ===
2007 Angus Council election

2007 Council election: Montrose and District
Party	Candidate	FPv%	%	Seat	Count
Independent	Mark Salmond	1,550	28.1	1	1
SNP	Sandy West	832	15.1	4	5
SNP	Paul Valentine	809	14.7	3	5
Liberal Democrats	David May	660	12.0	2	5
Conservative	Ingram Bruce	645	11.7		
Labour	James Sinclair	529	9.6		
Independent	Joe Wishart	490	8.9		
