= Arbroath East and Lunan (ward) =

Location of the ward

Arbroath East and Lunan is one of the eight wards used to elect members of the Angus Council. It elects three Councillors.

== Councillors ==
Election	Councillors			
2007	Jim Millar (Conservative)	Sheena Welsh (SNP)	Robert Ritchie Spink (Ind.)	Donald Morrison (SNP)
2012	Martyn Geddes (Conservative)	Sheena Welsh (SNP)	Robert Ritchie Spink (Ind.)	Donald Morrison (SNP)
2016 by	Martyn Geddes (Conservative)	Sheena Welsh (SNP)	Brendea Durno (SNP)	Donald Morrison (SNP)
2017	Derek Wann (Conservative)	Lois Speed (Ind.)	Brendea Durno (SNP)	3 seats
2022	Derek Wann (Conservative)	Lois Speed (Ind.)	Brendea Durno (SNP)	3 seats

== Election results ==
=== 2022 election ===
Arbroath East and Lunan – 3 seats
Party	Candidate	FPv%	Count					
Party	Candidate	FPv%	1	2	3	4	5	6
Independent	Lois Speed (incumbent)	31.0	1,177					
SNP	Brenda Durno (incumbent)	28.6	1,085					
Conservative	Derek Wann (incumbent)	17.7	671	717	718	744	844	1,054
SNP	Graham Smith	13.0	492	548	671	688	753	
Labour	Luke Andrew Stronach	7.0	265	303	306	371		
Liberal Democrats	Jane Atkins	2.8	108	139	142			
Electorate: 10,486 Valid: 3,798 Spoilt: 76 Quota: 950 Turnout: 36.9%

=== 2017 election ===
2017 Angus Council election

Arbroath East and Lunan - 3 seats
Party	Candidate	FPv%	Count						
Party	Candidate	FPv%	1	2	3	4	5	6	7
Conservative	Derek Wann	24.4%	852	860	866	901			
SNP	Brenda Durno (incumbent)	22.5%	786	791	793	822	823	841	879
Independent	Lois Speed	21.9%	763	773	798	858	865	1,071	
SNP	Sheena Welsh (incumbent)	12.8%	446	447	449	466	467	480	502
Labour	John Ruddy	7.4%	257	261	263				
Independent	Kevin Smith	7.3%	254	268	293	348	356		
Independent	Ian Watson	2.1%	72	74					
Liberal Democrats	Mark Smith	1.6%	56						
Electorate: 10,054 Valid: 3,486 Spoilt: 63 Quota: 872 Turnout: 35.3%

=== 2016 by-election ===
Arbroath East and Lunan By-election (28 November 2016)- 1 Seat
Party	Candidate	FPv%	Count					
Party	Candidate	FPv%	1	2	3	4	5	6
SNP	Brenda Durno	35.0	919	925	956	1,010	1,172	1,357
Conservative	Derek Wann	27.0	709	723	741	799	928	
Independent	Lois Speed	17.2	452	457	482	619		
Independent	Kevin Smith	11.8	309	315	352			
Labour	John Ruddy	6.7	177	191				
Liberal Democrats	Richard Moore	2.3	60					
Electorate: 12,409 Valid: 2,626 Spoilt: 42 Turnout: 21.5%

=== 2012 election ===
2012 Angus Council election

Arbroath East and Lunan - 4 seats
Party	Candidate	FPv%	Count					
Party	Candidate	FPv%	1	2	3	4	5	6
Independent	Bob Spink (incumbent)††	25.76%	955					
SNP	Sheena Welsh (incumbent)	23.15%	858					
SNP	Donald Morrison (incumbent)	20.66%	766					
Conservative	Martyn Geddes	14.76%	547	600.3	609.4	610.8	641.9	784.2
Labour	Alastair Stuart	12.73%	472	509	529.6	533.8	577.3	
Liberal Democrats	Ginny Graham	2.9%	109	142.8	153.7	155.4		
Electorate: 11,032 Valid: 3,707 Spoilt: 70 Quota: 742 Turnout: 3,777 (33.6%)

=== 2007 election ===
2007 Angus Council election

2007 Council election: Arbroath East and Lunan
Party	Candidate	FPv%	%	Seat	Count
SNP	Sheena Welsh	1,282	24.7	1	1
Independent	Robert Ritchie Spink	1,041	20.0	2	1
Conservative	Jim Millar	789	15.2	3	6
Labour	Alastair John Stuart	677	13.0		
SNP	Donald Morrison	620	11.9	4	6
Liberal Democrats	Ginny Graham	504	9.7		
Independent	Ian Watson	281	5.4		
