= Arbroath West, Letham and Friockheim (ward) =

Location of the ward

Arbroath West, Letham and Friockheim is one of the eight wards used to elect members of the Angus Council. It elects four Councillors.

== Councillors ==
Election	Councillors			
2007	David Lumgair (Conservative)	Alex King (SNP)	David Fairweather (Ind.)	Peter Nield (Liberal Democrats)
2012	David Lumgair (Conservative)	Alex King (SNP)	David Fairweather (Ind.)	Ewan Smith (SNP)
2017	David Lumgair (Conservative)	Alex King (SNP)	David Fairweather (Ind.)	Richard Moore (Liberal Democrats)
2022	Louise Nicol (Conservative)	Serena Cowdy (SNP)	David Fairweather (Ind.)	Martin Shephard (SNP)
2024	Louise Nicol (Conservative)	Serena Cowdy (SNP)	Jack Cruickshanks (Conservative)	Martin Shephard (SNP)

== Election results ==
=== 2024 by-election ===
Arbroath West, Letham and Friockheim by-election (25 April 2024) – 1 seat
Party	Candidate	FPv%	Count				
Party	Candidate	FPv%	1	2	3	4	5
Conservative	Jack Cruickshanks	41.9	1,682	1,691	1,759	1,997	2,450
SNP	Kathleen Wolf	29.3	1,175	1,237	1,279	1,467	
Labour	Mark Hilton	16.0	644	676	833		
Liberal Democrats	Sandra O'Shea	8.3	333	375			
Green	Mark David Findlay	4.4	176				
Electorate: 13,810 Valid: 4,010 Spoilt: 45 Quota: 2,006 Turnout: 29.4%

=== 2022 election ===
Arbroath West, Letham and Friockheim – 4 seats
Party	Candidate	FPv%	Count									
Party	Candidate	FPv%	1	2	3	4	5	6	7	8	9	10
Conservative	Louise Nicol	25.6	1,663									
SNP	Serena Cowdy	22.1	1,440									
SNP	Martin Shephard	14.0	913	915	1,027	1,058	1,136	1,161	1,236	1,337		
Independent	Ian Wren	8.9	578	585	587	599	617	665	749			
Independent	David Fairweather (incumbent)	8.1	524	538	541	556	589	635	752	1,013	1,021	1,320
Labour	Pamela Ruddy	6.5	423	433	434	438	464	560				
Conservative	Juliet Vivers	5.8	376	671	671	674	683	729	807	895	896	
Liberal Democrats	Rod Falconer	4.4	286	297	299	302	338					
Green	Anne Campbell	3.3	214	216	227	241						
Alba	Lisa Keogh	1.3	86	86	89							
Electorate: 14,052 Valid: 6,503 Spoilt: 98 Quota: 1,301 Turnout: 47.0%

=== 2017 election ===
2017 Angus Council election

Arbroath West, Letham and Friockheim - 4 seats
Party	Candidate	FPv%	Count				
Party	Candidate	FPv%	1	2	3	4	5
Conservative	David Lumgair (incumbent)	42.32%	2,585				
Independent	David Fairweather (incumbent)	23.98%	1,465				
SNP	Alex King (incumbent)	19.75%	1,206	1,251			
SNP	Donald Morrison (incumbent)*	8.61%	526	545	589	614	
Liberal Democrats	Richard Moore	5.34%	326	979	1,076	1,077	1,323
Electorate: TBC Valid: 6,108 Spoilt: 105 Quota: 1,222 Turnout: 45.2%

=== 2012 election ===
2012 Angus Council election

Arbroath West and Letham - 4 seats
Party	Candidate	FPv%	Count						
Party	Candidate	FPv%	1	2	3	4	5	6	7
SNP	Alex King (incumbent)	23.57%	1,033						
Conservative	David Lumgair (incumbent)	21.91%	960						
Independent	David Fairweather (incumbent)	17.05%	747	751.8	768.2	829.5	883.8		
SNP	Ewan Smith †	14.90%	653	785.7	791.3	812.9	851.8	852.7	894.4
Labour	Alec Mollison	9.65%	423	426.8	431.1	446.5	487.1	487.9	537.4
Independent	Peter Nield (incumbent)	4.36%	191	194.2	201.4	238.6	268.9	271.9	
Liberal Democrats	Kevin Barthorpe	4.36%	191	193.7	205.7	223.5			
Independent	Ian Watson	4.2%	184	185.2	192.9				
Electorate: 11,230 Valid: 4,382 Spoilt: 59 Quota: 877 Turnout: 4,441 (39.02%)

=== 2007 election ===
2007 Angus Council election

2007 Council election: Arbroath West and Letham
Party	Candidate	FPv%	%	Seat	Count
Conservative	David Lumgair	1,322	21.4	1	1
SNP	Alex King	1,169	18.9	3	6
Independent	David Fairweather	1,117	18.1	2	4
Liberal Democrats	Peter Nield	857	13.9	4	8
Labour	Joan Warren	627	10.2		
SNP	Brian Milne	565	9.1		
Independent	Anne Marie Sim	485	7.9		
Independent	Rob Pearce	35	0.6		
