= Carnoustie and District (ward) =

Electoral ward in Angus, Scotland

Location of the ward

Carnoustie and District is one of the eight wards used to elect members of the Angus Council. It elects four Councillors.

== Councillors ==
Election	Councillors		
2007	Peter Murphy (Labour)	Helen Oswald (SNP)	Ralph Palmer (SNP)
2011 by-	Peter Murphy (Labour)	Helen Oswald (SNP)	Brian Boyd (Ind.)
2012	Bill Bowles (Ind.)	Helen Oswald (SNP)	Brian Boyd (Ind.)
2016 by-	Bill Bowles (Ind.)	David Cheape (Ind.)	Brian Boyd (Ind.)
2017	Mark McDonald (SNP)	David Cheape (Ind.)	Brian Boyd (Ind.)
2022	Mark McDonald (SNP)	David Cheape (Ind.)	Brian Boyd (Ind.)

== Election results ==
=== 2022 election ===
Carnoustie and District – 3 seats
Party	Candidate	FPv%	Count					
Party	Candidate	FPv%	1	2	3	4	5	6
SNP	Mark McDonald (incumbent)	35.9	1,939					
Independent	David Cheape (incumbent)	19.1	1,034	1,108	1,148	1,212	1,326	1,684
Independent	Brian Boyd (incumbent)	17.7	956	1,033	1,060	1,097	1,187	1,449
Conservative	Robert Galloway	17.3	933	944	949	997	1,028	
Liberal Democrats	Matthias Glenday	4.5	242	272	286			
Scottish Green	Robbie Kelly	3.2	174	359	429	504		
Alba	Laura Tierney	2.3	123	202				
Electorate: 11,206 Valid: 5,401 Spoilt: 70 Quota: 1,351 Turnout: 48.8%

=== 2017 election ===
2017 Angus Council election

Carnoustie and District - 3 seats
Party	Candidate	FPv%	Count						
Party	Candidate	FPv%	1	2	3	4	5	6	7
SNP	Mark McDonald	26.78%	1,359						
Independent	Brian Boyd (incumbent)	18.09%	918	930	948	1,000	1,271		
Independent	David Cheape (incumbent)	17.91%	909	924	937	1,014	1,224	1,226	1,643
Conservative	Terry O'Halloran	17.71%	899	901	919	978	1,038	1,038	
Independent	Bill Bowles (incumbent)	11.21%	569	581	587	647			
Labour	Joanne McFadden	6.92%	351	361	380				
Liberal Democrats	Beth Morrison	1.38%	70	77					
Electorate: TBC Valid: 5,075 Spoilt: 49 Quota: 1,269 Turnout: 47.6%

=== 2016 by-election ===
Carnoustie and District By-election (5 December 2016) - 1 Seat
Party	Candidate	FPv%	Count			
Party	Candidate	FPv%	1	2	3	4
Independent	David Cheape	43.5%	1,401	1,420	1,477	1,737
SNP	Mark McDonald	32.1%	1,033	1,043	1,078	1,117
Conservative	Derek Shaw	17.7%	568	586	606	
Labour	Ray Strachan	4.4%	141	151		
Liberal Democrats	Beth Morrison	2.3%	75			
Electorate: 10,752 Valid: 3,218 Spoilt: 28 Quota: 1,610 Turnout: 30.2%

=== 2012 election ===
2012 Angus Council election

Carnoustie and District - 3 seats
Party	Candidate	FPv%	Count					
Party	Candidate	FPv%	1	2	3	4	5	6
Independent	Brian Boyd (incumbent)	39.5%	1,750					
SNP	Helen Oswald (incumbent)†††	23.23%	1,029	1,135.4				
SNP	Fiona Gibb	13.14%	582	613.2	632.8	636.9	654.4	712.5
Independent	Bill Bowles	10.9%	483	841.4	844.7	856.2	970.4	1,084
Labour	Hamid Rasheed	6.19%	274	297.1	298.8	311.2	337.9	
Conservative	Adam Cormie	6.12%	271	299.5	299.7	306.2		
Liberal Democrats	Lorraine Barthorpe	1%	41.4	49.8	49.8			
Electorate: 9,955 Valid: 4,430 Spoilt: 54 Quota: 1,108 Turnout: 4,484 (44.5%)

=== 2007 election ===
2007 Angus Council election

2007 Council election: Carnoustie and District
Party	Candidate	FPv%	%	Seat	Count
SNP	Helen Oswald	1,837	34.6	1	1
Labour	Peter Murphy	1,160	21.8	2	4
Conservative	John Richard Hillman	863	16.3		
Liberal Democrats	Eddie Wilmott	748	14.1		
SNP	Ralph Palmer	639	12.0	3	6
Solidarity	Alan Manley	62	1.2		
