= 1984 Angus District Council election =

1984 Scottish local government election

The 1984 Angus District Council election took place on the 1 May 1984 to elect members of Angus District Council, as part of that year's Scottish local elections. They were fought on revised boundaries, with 21 seats down from 22.

== Election results ==
Angus District Election Result 1984
| Party | Seats | Gains | Losses | Net gain/loss | Seats % | Votes % | Votes | +/− |
|---|---|---|---|---|---|---|---|---|
| SNP | 11 | +6 | 0 | +6 | | 42.1 | 11,863 | +5.7 |
| Conservative | 8 | 1 | -4 | -3 | | 38.1 | 10,738 | -1.4 |
| Labour | 0 | 0 | -2 | -2 | 0.0 | 10.6 | 2,999 | -4.5 |
| Independent | 2 | 0 | -2 | -2 | | 7.1 | 2,009 | -1.1 |
| Alliance | 0 | 0 | 0 | 0 | 0.0 | 2.0 | 556 | New |

== Ward results ==
Harbour
| Party | Candidate | Votes | % | ±% |
|---|---|---|---|---|
| SNP | A. King | 599 | 58.4 | +17.1 |
| Conservative | E. H. Milne | 306 | 29.8 | −12.7 |
| Labour | T. G. Beattie | 121 | 11.8 | −4.0 |
| Majority | | 293 | 28.5 | |
| Turnout | | 1027 | 40.8 | −0.2 |
| SNP gain from Conservative | | Swing | | |

Abbey
| Party | Candidate | Votes | % | ±% |
|---|---|---|---|---|
| SNP | Andrew Welsh | 1,257 | 55.3 | +22.0 |
| Labour | J. M. Proctor | 620 | 27.3 | −25.7 |
| Conservative | Ms. M. Peacock | 339 | 14.9 | +1.2 |
| Alliance | Ms. M. McLenzie | 53 | 2.3 | +2.3 |
| Majority | | 637 | 28.4 | |
| Turnout | | 2237 | 52.3 | +3.0 |
| SNP gain from Labour | | Swing | | |

Timmergreens and Elms
| Party | Candidate | Votes | % | ±% |
|---|---|---|---|---|
| SNP | C. S. B. Meldrum | 618 | 38.2 | +14.5 |
| Labour | G. A. Whiteside | 452 | 27.9 | −16.2 |
| Conservative | R. Grieve | 392 | 24.2 | −7.9 |
| Alliance | J. R. Mckelvie | 157 | 9.7 | +9.7 |
| Majority | | 166 | 10.2 | |
| Turnout | | 1619 | 48.2 | −4.2 |
| SNP gain from Labour | | Swing | | |

Arbirlot/Hospitalfield
| Party | Candidate | Votes | % | ±% |
|---|---|---|---|---|
| Conservative | Helen Cargill | 708 | 58.6 | +2.6 |
| SNP | N. Thomson | 284 | 23.5 | −0.6 |
| Alliance | R. B. Spiers | 162 | 13.4 | +13.4 |
| Labour | W. J. Irving | 53 | 4.4 | −12.3 |
| Majority | | 505 | 35.0 | +3.1 |
| Turnout | | 1208 | 39.9 | |

Marywell/Cliffburn
| Party | Candidate | Votes | % | ±% |
|---|---|---|---|---|
| SNP | Ms S. M. Welsh | 882 | 60.1 | +23.2 |
| Conservative | Ms E. C. Hill | 324 | 22.1 | −10.7 |
| Labour | Ms. J. S. Fairweather | 262 | 17.8 | −12.4 |
| Majority | | 558 | | |
| Turnout | | 1468 | 42.0 | −3.7 |
| SNP hold | | Swing | | |

Colliston/Hayshead
| Party | Candidate | Votes | % | ±% |
|---|---|---|---|---|
| SNP | B. M. C. Milne | 734 | 49.0 | +1.1 |
| Labour | F. Donaldson | 422 | 28.2 | −8.2 |
| Conservative | A. M. R. Broadfoot | 340 | 22.7 | +8.0 |
| Majority | | 312 | | |
| Turnout | | 1497 | 44.3 | −1.5 |
| SNP hold | | Swing | | |

Carnoustie East
| Party | Candidate | Votes | % | ±% |
|---|---|---|---|---|
| Conservative | K. Hirstwood | 1,215 | 58.6 | −4.2 |
| SNP | T. J. Blackhall | 634 | 30.6 | −6.0 |
| Labour | F. G. Pearson | 222 | 10.7 | +10.7 |
| Majority | | 581 | 28.0 | +1.8 |
| Turnout | | 2072 | 45.6 | −5.1 |

Carnoustie West and Panmure
| Party | Candidate | Votes | % | ±% |
|---|---|---|---|---|
| Conservative | J. Gray | 829 | 49.3 | +3.4 |
| SNP | S. Ramsay | 586 | 34.8 | −9.9 |
| Labour | Ms. J. Kettles | 263 | 15.6 | +6.5 |
| Majority | | 243 | 14.4 | +13.2 |
| Turnout | | 1682 | 43.1 | −6.1 |

Forfar Central/Lemno
| Party | Candidate | Votes | % | ±% |
|---|---|---|---|---|
| Conservative | Ms. A. E. D. Thomson | 829 | 54.7 | |
| SNP | Ian Hudghton | 684 | 45.1 | |
| Majority | | | | |
| Turnout | | | | |
| Conservative hold | | Swing | | |

Dunnichen
| Party | Candidate | Votes | % | ±% |
|---|---|---|---|---|
| SNP | G. Suttie | 851 | 52.2 | |
| Conservative | M. H. Hill | 773 | 47.4 | |
| Majority | | 78 | | |
| Turnout | | 1630 | 42.1 | |
| SNP hold | | Swing | | |

Montrose North
| Party | Candidate | Votes | % | ±% |
|---|---|---|---|---|
| Independent | G. Norrie | 1,034 | 80.3 | +2.8 |
| SNP | D. A. MacAllan | 251 | 19.5 | +19.5 |
| Majority | | 783 | | |
| Turnout | | 1288 | 38.8 | |

Hillside
| Party | Candidate | Votes | % | ±% |
|---|---|---|---|---|
| SNP | Mike Weir | 620 | 47.8 | +47.8 |
| Conservative | W. J. Fraser | 438 | 33.8 | +33.8 |
| Labour | F. Wood | 234 | 18.1 | −21.5 |
| Majority | | 182 | | |
| Turnout | | 1296 | 36.0 | |
| SNP gain from Independent | | Swing | | |

Kirriemuir
| Party | Candidate | Votes | % | ±% |
|---|---|---|---|---|
| SNP | R. Wright | 1,021 | 52.0 | +10.9 |
| Conservative | F. Urquhart | 940 | 47.9 | −10.9 |
| Majority | | 81 | 4.1 | |
| Turnout | | 1964 | 47.5 | +1.8 |
| SNP gain from Conservative | | Swing | 10.9 | |

Western Glens
| Party | Candidate | Votes | % | ±% |
|---|---|---|---|---|
| Conservative | Ms. R. Dundas | | | |
| Majority | | | | |
| Turnout | | | | |

Eastern Glens
| Party | Candidate | Votes | % | ±% |
|---|---|---|---|---|
| Conservative | David Myles | 392 | 67.6 | +5.9 |
| SNP | H. T. Skinner | 102 | 17.6 | −20.6 |
| Alliance | A. E. Shearer | 83 | 14.3 | +14.3 |
| Majority | | 290 | | |
| Turnout | | 580 | 49.2 | |

Langlands
| Party | Candidate | Votes | % | ±% |
|---|---|---|---|---|
| SNP | W. R. Roberton | | | |
| Majority | | | | |
| Turnout | | | | |

Westfield Dean
| Party | Candidate | Votes | % | ±% |
|---|---|---|---|---|
| SNP | A. E. Thomson | 760 | 55.0 | +9.6 |
| Conservative | M. Struthers | 620 | 44.9 | −9.6 |
| Majority | | 140 | | |
| Turnout | | 1381 | 40.6 | |

Montrose South
| Party | Candidate | Votes | % | ±% |
|---|---|---|---|---|
| Independent | W. M. Philips | 496 | 40.7 | +40.7 |
| SNP | W. A. West | 334 | 27.4 | +27.4 |
| Conservative | R. O. Harris | 283 | 23.2 | +23.2 |
| Alliance | Ms. R. Stevens | 101 | 8.3 | +8.3 |
| Majority | | 162 | | |
| Turnout | | 1218 | 35.5 | |

Lunan
| Party | Candidate | Votes | % | ±% |
|---|---|---|---|---|
| Conservative | Ms. Isobel M. McLellan | 804 | 62.5 | |
| Independent | J. M. D. Smith | 479 | 37.2 | |
| Majority | | 325 | | |
| Turnout | | 1286 | 37.3 | |

Brechin North
| Party | Candidate | Votes | % | ±% |
|---|---|---|---|---|
| Conservative | A. Buchan | 923 | 53.9 | +53.9 |
| SNP | G. P. Allan | 611 | 35.7 | +35.7 |
| Labour | P. J. Thompson | 171 | 10.0 | +10.0 |
| Majority | | 312 | | |
| Turnout | | 1712 | 47.4 | |
| Conservative gain from Independent | | Swing | | |

Brechin South
| Party | Candidate | Votes | % | ±% |
|---|---|---|---|---|
| SNP | J. Thomson | 1,035 | 69.0 | +19.7 |
| Conservative | W. Forbes-Hamilton | 283 | 18.9 | |
| Labour | Ms. J. C. V. McFatridge | 179 | 11.9 | −13.9 |
| Majority | | 752 | | |
| Turnout | | 1501 | 47.1 | |
| SNP hold | | Swing | | |
