= Brechin and Edzell (ward) =

- Angus Council
- Boundary of Brechin and Edzell in Angus from 2017.
- Electorate: 8,877

Current ward
- Created: 2007
- Councillor: Chris Beattie (SNP)
- Councillor: Gavin Nicol (Conservative)
- Councillor: Jill Scott (Independent)

Brechin and Edzell is one of the eight wards used to elect members of the Angus Council. It elects three Councillors.

== Councillors ==
Election	Councillors		
2007	Mairi Evans (SNP)	Ruth Leslie Melville (Ind.)	Bob Myles (Ind.)
2012	Mairi Evans (SNP)	Jim Houston (SNP)	Bob Myles (Ind.)
2017	Kenny Braes (SNP)	Gavin Nicol (Conservative)	Bob Myles (Ind.)
2022	Chris Beattie (SNP)	Gavin Nicol (Conservative)	Jill Scott (Ind.)

== Election results ==
=== 2022 election ===
Brechin and Edzell – 3 seats
Party	Candidate	FPv%	Count		
Party	Candidate	FPv%	1	2	3
SNP	Chris Beattie	34.1	1,341		
Conservative	Gavin Nicol (incumbent)	32.3	1,271		
Independent	Jill Scott	20.4	804	914	1,020
Labour	Dawn Barrowman	7.2	283	356	390
Liberal Democrats	Alison Andrews	6.0	234	293	363
Electorate: 8,877 Valid: 3,933 Spoilt: 54 Quota: 984 Turnout: 44.9%

=== 2017 election ===
2017 Angus Council election

Brechin and Edzell - 3 seats
Party	Candidate	FPv%	Count						
Party	Candidate	FPv%	1	2	3	4	5	6	7
Conservative	Gavin Nicol	30.42%	1,281						
Independent	Bob Myles (incumbent)	18.81%	792	882	930	977	988	988	1,544
SNP	Kenny Braes	18.10%	762	765	776	794	1,055		
Independent	Jill Scott	17.48%	736	777	812	882	906	907	
Independent	Paul Wright*	7.31%	308	310	311	332			
Labour	Marjory Smith	4.82%	203	216	241				
Liberal Democrats	Alison Andrews	3.06%	129	153					
Electorate: TBC Valid: 4,211 Spoilt: 69 Quota: 1,053 Turnout: 47.4%

=== 2012 election ===
2012 Angus Council election

Brechin and Edzell - 3 seats
Party	Candidate	FPv%	Count				
Party	Candidate	FPv%	1	2	3	4	5
SNP	Mairi Evans (incumbent)	35.36	1,145				
Independent	Bob Myles (incumbent)	19.49	631	641.8	666.9	878.2	
Conservative	Jane Ferguson	15.01	486	495.7	533.4	617.7	645.6
SNP	Jim Houston	14.18	459	736.6	752.9	799.1	812.1
Independent	Douglas Murray	12.04	390	400.8	429.4		
Liberal Democrats	Janet Cowan	3.92	127	133.1			
Electorate: 8,386 Valid: 3,238 Spoilt: 62 Quota: 810 Turnout: 3,300 (38.61%)

=== 2007 election ===
2007 Angus Council election

2007 Council election: Brechin and Edzell
Party	Candidate	FPv%	%	Seat	Count
Independent	Ruth Leslie Melville	971	22.1	1	4
Independent	Bob Myles	798	18.1	2	6
SNP	Mairi Evans	765	17.4	3	8
SNP	Joy Mowatt	706	16.1		
Conservative	Elaine Milne	373	8.5		
Independent	David Adam	313	7.1		
Labour	Ron Thoms	286	6.5		
Liberal Democrats	Helen Fleming	185	4.2		
