= Dawn Black (Scottish politician) =

Scottish politician

Dawn Black MSP
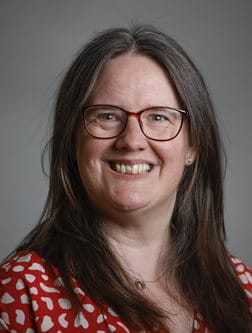
- Official portrait, 2026

Member of the Scottish Parliament for Angus North and Mearns
- Incumbent
- Assumed office 7 May 2026
- Preceded by: Mairi Gougeon
- Majority: 3,250 (11.2%)

Personal details
- Party: Scottish National Party

Dawn Black is a politician who has served as a Member of the Scottish Parliament for Angus North and Mearns since May 2026. She represents the Scottish National Party.

== Biography ==
Dawn was born in Wales and subsequently raised in Tunbridge Wells, England, before moving to North East Scotland during her teenage years.

In 2022, Dawn Black was elected to represent Stonehaven and Lower Deeside ward on Aberdeenshire Council. Black was the Scottish National Party candidate for the Angus North and Mearns constituency in the 2026 Scottish Parliament election, she was selected to succeed Mairi Gougeon. She was elected MSP.

Scottish Parliament
Preceded by Mairi Gougeon	Member of the Scottish Parliament for Angus North and Mearns; 2026–present	Incumbent
