= Monifieth and Sidlaw (ward) =

Location of the ward

Monifieth and Sidlaw is one of the eight wards used to elect members of the Angus Council. It elects four Councillors.

== Councillors ==
Election	Councillors			
2007	Margaret Thompson (Labour)	Frank Ellis (SNP)	Rob Murray (SNP)	John R Whyte (Conservative)
2009 by-	Margaret Thompson (Labour)	Jean Lee (SNP)	Rob Murray (SNP)	John R Whyte (Conservative)
2012	Margaret Thompson (Labour)	Sheila Hands (SNP)	Rob Murray (SNP)	Craig Fotheringham (Conservative)
2017	Ben Lawrie (Liberal Democrats)	Sheila Hands (SNP)	Beth Whiteside (SNP)	Craig Fotheringham (Conservative)
2022	Heather Doran (Labour)	Lloyd Melville (SNP)	Beth Whiteside (SNP)	Craig Fotheringham (Conservative)

== Election results ==
=== 2022 election ===
Monifieth and Sidlaw – 4 seats
Party	Candidate	FPv%	Count							
Party	Candidate	FPv%	1	2	3	4	5	6	7	8
Conservative	Craig Fotheringham (incumbent)	23.2	1,670							
SNP	Lloyd Melville	21.7	1,562							
SNP	Beth Whiteside (incumbent)	18.0	1,294	1,297	1,401	1,427	1,557			
Labour	Heather Doran	13.4	968	980	984	988	1,033	1,060	1,199	1,791
Liberal Democrats	Ben Lawrie (incumbent)	11.2	804	825	829	835	907	930	1,150	
Conservative	Calum Nicol	7.5	542	724	724	730	743	745		
Green	James Whitehead	4.0	287	288	292	300				
Alba	Blake Sharp	0.9	67	67	68					
Electorate: 14,214 Valid: 7,194 Spoilt: 132 Quota: 1,439 Turnout: 51.5%

=== 2017 election ===
2017 Angus Council election

Monifieth and Sidlaw - 4 seats
Party	Candidate	FPv%	Count				
Party	Candidate	FPv%	1	2	3	4	5
Conservative	Craig Fotheringham (incumbent)	43.40%	2,901				
SNP	Sheila Hands (incumbent)	25.83%	1,727				
Liberal Democrats	Ben Lawrie	11.88%	794	1,477			
Labour	Ray Strachan	9.62%	643	863	878	948	
SNP	Beth Whiteside	9.27%	620	660	1,005	1,021	1,254
Electorate: TBC Valid: 6,685 Spoilt: 111 Quota: 1,338 Turnout: 50.8%

=== 2012 Election ===
2012 Angus Council election

Monifieth and Sidlaw - 4 seats
Party	Candidate	FPv%	Count				
Party	Candidate	FPv%	1	2	3	4	5
Conservative	Craig Fotheringham	21.5%	1,170				
SNP	Sheila Hands	21.32%	1,160				
SNP	Rob Murray (incumbent)	20.69%	1,126				
Labour	Margaret Thomson (incumbent)	17.64%	960	970.4	973.7	975.6	1,098.1
SNP	Sandy Ritchie	14.5%	789	796.9	855.5	887.7	933.9
Liberal Democrats	Liz Petrie	4.32%	235	266.6	269.8	270.6	
Electorate: 12,692 Valid: 5,441 Spoilt: 40 Quota: 1,089 Turnout: 5,481 (42.87%)

=== 2007 Election ===
2007 Angus Council election

2007 Council election: Monifieth and Sidlaw
Party	Candidate	FPv%	%	Seat	Count
SNP	Frank Ellis	2,604	34.5	1	1
SNP	Rob Murray	1,496	19.8	2	2
Conservative	John R Whyte	1,396	18.5	3	3
Labour	Margaret Thomson	1,040	13.8	4	6
Liberal Democrats	Elizabeth Petrie	544	7.2		
Independent	Craig Fotheringham	473	6.3		
