= 1999 Angus Council election =

1999 Scottish local government election

Map showing results by ward.

Elections to Angus Council were held on 6 May 1999, the same day as the other Scottish local government elections.

== Election results ==
Angus local election result 1999
Party	Seats	Gains	Losses	Net gain/loss	Seats %	Votes %	Votes	+/−
SNP	21	1				46.53	22,742	▼5.6
Labour	1	1				18.28	8,934	▲3.2
Conservative	2		1	▼1		17.95	8,773	▼0.2
Liberal Democrats	2	1		▲1		8.89	4,346	▲1.7
Brechin Independent Group	2	2	0	▲2		5.01	2,451	▲5.0
Independent	1					3.23	1,577	▼4.5
Scottish Socialist	0				0.0	0.11	52	▲0.1

== Ward results ==
Kirriemuir West
Party	Candidate	Votes	%
Conservative	I. Mackintosh	973	47.6
SNP	K. A. Gowans	786	38.5
Labour	D. F. Begg	284	13.9
Majority		187	
Turnout		2043	64.5
Conservative hold			

Kirriemuir East
Party	Candidate	Votes	%
SNP	J. Henderson	834	47.1
Conservative	Ms. S. M. Bradford	681	38.5
Labour	Ms. C. B. Short	256	14.5
Majority		153	
Turnout		1762	56.4
SNP hold			

Brechin West
Party	Candidate	Votes	%
Brechin Independent Group	Ms. R. J. Leslie-Melville	1,023	52.2
SNP	G. P. Allan	672	34.3
Labour	Ms. C. McIlroy	263	13.4
Majority		351	
Turnout		1945	59.7
Independent gain from SNP			

Brechin North Esk
Party	Candidate	Votes	%
Brechin Independent Group	R. J. Myles	933	51.8
SNP	S. N. Mowatt	585	32.5
Labour	D. K. Todd	283	15.7
Majority		348	
Turnout		1782	56.4
Independent gain from SNP			

Westfield and Dean
Party	Candidate	Votes	%
SNP	F. E. Duncan	867	46.5
Conservative	A. J. Rymer	717	38.4
Labour	J. A. C. Caution	281	15.1
Majority		150	
Turnout		1851	59.1
SNP hold			

Forfar West
Party	Candidate	Votes	%
SNP	Ms. G. H. Middleton	995	61.8
Conservative	C. J. R. Dickens	616	38.2
Majority		379	
Turnout		1588	54.5
SNP hold			

Forfar Central
Party	Candidate	Votes	%
SNP	S. Leslie	757	46.7
Conservative	A. A. A. Cochrane-Dyet	544	33.6
Labour	Ms. R. H. Lowe	319	19.7
Majority		213	
Turnout			55.1
SNP hold			

Forfar East
Party	Candidate	Votes	%
SNP	W. Middleton	927	65.3
Liberal Democrats	Ms. H. C. Fleming	492	34.7
Majority		435	
Turnout		1397	49.8
SNP hold			

Brechin South Esk
Party	Candidate	Votes	%
SNP	Ms. J. M. Mowatt	535	41.4
Brechin Independent Group	R. J. G. Malcolm	495	38.3
Labour	R. K. Gittins	263	20.3
Majority		40	
Turnout		1282	47.9
SNP hold			

Montrose Ferryden
Party	Candidate	Votes	%
SNP	W. A. West	656	42.7
Conservative	M. S. Salmond	469	30.5
Labour	J. Sinclair	284	18.5
Liberal Democrats	Ms R. Stevens	129	8.4
Majority		187	
Turnout		1534	50.1
SNP hold			

Montrose Central
Party	Candidate	Votes	%
SNP	W. G. Crowe	499	33.1
Labour	R. Gilbert	367	24.3
Conservative	J. A. Sutcliffe	253	16.8
Independent	F. G. Stephen	226	15.0
Liberal Democrats	P. J. Stevens	163	10.8
Majority		132	
Turnout		1504	51.0
SNP hold			

Montrose West
Party	Candidate	Votes	%
Independent	G. Norrie	1,108	64.9
SNP	J. Dorward	433	25.4
Labour	M. D. Holehouse	167	9.8
Majority		675	
Turnout		1697	54.5
Independent hold			

Montrose Hillside
Party	Candidate	Votes	%
SNP	Ms. K. M. Ritchie	742	46.1
Labour	F. Wood	422	26.2
Conservative	P. Davies	305	18.9
Liberal Democrats	C. T. Ironside	141	8.8
Majority		320	
Turnout		1606	55.0
SNP hold			

Forfar South
Party	Candidate	Votes	%
SNP	W. R. Roberton	684	49.8
Conservative	Ms. N. J. Rymer	307	22.4
Labour	Ms. A. Dixon	262	19.1
Liberal Democrats	Ms. L. M. Casebow	120	8.7
Majority		377	
Turnout		1427	55.8
SNP hold			

Letham and Friockheim
Party	Candidate	Votes	%
Conservative	D. Lumgair	765	41.4
SNP	Ms. H. M. W. Angus	638	34.5
Liberal Democrats	Ms. A. M. A. Simpson	226	12.2
Labour	I. Davidson	219	11.9
Majority		127	
Turnout		1840	60.1
Conservative gain from SNP			

Sidlaw West
Party	Candidate	Votes	%
SNP	F. Ellis	1,018	51.0
Conservative	T. I. N. Young	641	32.1
Labour	R. S. Bannerman	337	16.9
Majority		377	
Turnout		1984	64.3
SNP gain from Conservative			

Sidlaw East & Ashludie
Party	Candidate	Votes	%
SNP	Ms. C. C. C. Ellis	1,102	58.4
Conservative	K. M. U. Nicoll	515	27.3
Labour	Ms. F. Madden	270	14.3
Majority		587	
Turnout		1880	59.5
SNP hold			

Monifieth West
Party	Candidate	Votes	%
SNP	H. S. McGlynn	1,529	78.6
Labour	P. Grimes	417	21.4
Majority		1112	
Turnout		1911	61.6

Monifieth Central
Party	Candidate	Votes	%
SNP	R. J. Murray	1,150	61.0
Conservative	S. D. Ramsay	473	25.1
Labour	P. E. Rae	263	13.9
Majority		677	
Turnout		1880	65.1
SNP hold			

Carnoustie West
Party	Candidate	Votes	%
SNP	J. C. Gibb	1,197	73.2
Labour	A. J. Stuart	438	26.8
Majority		759	
Turnout		1590	52.7
SNP hold			

Carnoustie Central
Party	Candidate	Votes	%
Labour	P. A. Murphy	893	50.7
SNP	Ms. H. Oswald	868	49.3
Majority		25	
Turnout		1703	58.6
Labour gain from SNP			

Carnoustie East
Party	Candidate	Votes	%
SNP	D. Selfridge	1,104	57.9
Conservative	A. J. Dobie	491	25.7
Labour	Ms. G. Pallis	313	16.4
Majority		613	
Turnout		1903	65.2
SNP hold			

Arbirlot & Hospitalfield
Party	Candidate	Votes	%
Liberal Democrats	P. Nield	625	36.7
SNP	A. W. Shand	453	26.6
Conservative	S. Tucker	378	22.2
Labour	Ms. J. Bruce	246	14.5
Majority		172	
Turnout		1701	58.4
Liberal Democrats gain from SNP			

Keptie
Party	Candidate	Votes	%
Liberal Democrats	R. B. Spiers	751	43.4
SNP	R. F. Swan	478	27.6
Labour	Ms. C. Savage	257	14.9
Independent	A. McKinnon	243	14.1
Majority		273	
Turnout		1718	58.3
Liberal Democrats hold			

Arbroath North
Party	Candidate	Votes	%
SNP	A. J. Gray	574	35.6
Liberal Democrats	Ms. M. M. McKelvie	411	25.5
Conservative	R. A. G. Stuart	316	19.6
Labour	E. Gerrard	311	19.3
Majority		163	
Turnout		1608	55.3
SNP hold			

Brothock
Party	Candidate	Votes	%
SNP	I. J. Angus	702	47.6
Labour	Ms. J. Warren	392	26.6
Liberal Democrats	J. G. Paterson	328	22.3
Scottish Socialist	Ms. M. M. Braid	52	3.5
Majority		310	
Turnout		1462	51.9
SNP hold			

Hayshead & Lunan
Party	Candidate	Votes	%
SNP	B. M. C. Milne	690	42.9
Liberal Democrats	Ms. J. E. Paterson	464	28.8
Labour	D. W. Savage	455	28.3
Majority		226	
Turnout		1594	54.3
SNP hold			

Harbour
Party	Candidate	Votes	%
SNP	A. King	528	37.2
Labour	R. G. Thoms	341	24.0
Conservative	N. P. Spiers	328	23.1
Liberal Democrats	H. O. Will	223	15.7
Majority		187	
Turnout		1413	47.0
SNP hold			

Cliffburn
Party	Candidate	Votes	%
SNP	Ms S. M. Welsh	739	55.0
Labour	Ms. D. Milne	331	24.6
Liberal Democrats	Ms. A. S. Vann	273	20.3
Majority		408	
Turnout		1329	48.0
SNP hold			
