= 1995 Angus Council election =

1995 Scottish local government election

Map showing results by ward.

Elections to Angus Council were held on 6 April 1995, the same day as the other Scottish local government elections.

== Election results ==
Angus local election result 1995
Party	Seats	Gains	Losses	Net gain/loss	Seats %	Votes %	Votes	+/−
SNP	21					53.4	19,870	
Conservative	2					18.6	6,925	
Liberal Democrats	2					6.9	2,573	
Independent	1					5.4	2,011	
Labour	0				0.0	15.5	5,779	
Other parties	0				0.0	0.1	50	
