= 2022 Angus Council election =

Angus Council election

- 5 May 2022

All 28 seats to Angus Council 15 seats needed for a majority
- Registered: 92,083
- Turnout: 46.1%

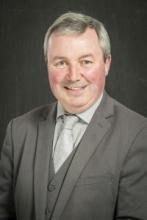
	First party	Second party
Leader	Beth Whiteside	Craig Fotheringham
Party	SNP	Conservative
Leader's seat	Monifieth and Sidlaw	Monifieth and Sidlaw
Last election	9 seats, 31.2%	8 seats, 33.9%
Seats before	9	8
Seats won	13	7
Seat change	▲4	▼1
Popular vote	16,025	11,142
Percentage	38.3%	26.6%
Swing	▲7.1%	▼7.3%
	Third party	Fourth party
Leader	David Fairweather	Heather Doran
Party	Independent	Labour
Leader's seat	Arbroath West, Letham and Friockheim	Monifieth and Sidlaw
Last election	9 seats, 25.0%	0 seats, 5.4%
Seats before	10	0
Seats won	7	1
Seat change	▼2	▲1
Popular vote	7,932	2,870
Percentage	19.0%	6.9%
Swing	▼6.0%	▲1.5%
- Results by ward
Leader before election
David Fairweather
(Independent)
No overall control
Leader after election
Beth Whiteside
(SNP)
No overall control

Elections to Angus Council took place on 5 May 2022, the same day as the 31 other Scottish local government elections. As with other Scottish council elections, it was held using single transferable vote (STV) – a form of proportional representation – in which multiple candidates are elected in each ward and voters rank candidates in order of preference.

For the 11th consecutive election, the Scottish National Party (SNP) were returned as the largest party with 13 seats – two shy of an overall majority. The Conservatives lost much of the ground they had made up in the previous election as their vote share fell by 7.3%, losing one seat to return seven councillors. The number of independents fell by two to seven, and the remaining seat was won by Labour. The Liberal Democrats lost both their seats.

The outgoing Conservative–Liberal Democrat–independent coalition was replaced by an SNP–independent administration with Cllr Beth Whiteside elected as council leader and Cllr Brian Boyd elected as Provost.

== Background ==
=== Previous election ===
At the previous election in 2017, the Scottish National Party (SNP) remained the largest party – tied with the number of independents – despite losing 40 per cent of their seats. As a result, they lost control of the council to a coalition of independents, Conservatives and Liberal Democrats. The Conservatives came third despite recording the largest share of first preference votes as they gained four seats to double their number of councillors. The Liberal Democrats also gained one seat to double their representation, while Labour – who received a larger vote share than the Liberal Democrats – lost their only seat.

2017 Angus Council election result
Party	Seats	Vote share
SNP	9	31.2%
Independent	9	25.0%
Conservatives	8	33.9%
Liberal Democrats	2	4.6%

=== Electoral system ===
The election used the eight wards created under the Local Governance (Scotland) Act 2004, with 28 councillors being elected. Each ward elected either 3 or 4 members, using the single transferable vote (STV) electoral system – a form of proportional representation – where candidates are ranked in order of preference.

=== Composition ===
No by-elections were held following the previous election in 2017. The only change in the political composition of the council came when Arbroath West, Letham and Friockheim councillor Richard Moore resigned from the Liberal Democrats and sat as an independent after he was found to have inappropriately touched several women.

Angus Council composition
Party	2017 result	Dissolution
SNP	9	9
Independent	9	10
Conservative	8	8
Liberal Democrats	2	1

=== Retiring councillors ===
Retiring councillors
Ward	Party	Retiring councillor
Kirriemuir and Dean	Conservative	Angus Macmillan-Douglas
Brechin and Edzell	Independent	Bob Myles
Forfar and District	Conservative	Braden Davy
Monifeith and Sidlaw	SNP	Shelia Harris
Arbroath West, Letham and Friockheim	SNP	Alex King
Arbroath West, Letham and Friockheim	Conservative	David Lumgair
Arbroath West, Letham and Friockheim	Independent	Richard Moore
Montrose and District	Conservative	Ron Sturrock

=== Candidates ===
The total number of candidates increased from 53 in 2017 to 56. As with the previous election, the SNP fielded the most candidates at 14 – one fewer than in 2017. After their success in the 2017 election, the Conservatives fielded a total of 11 candidates – two more than the previous election – while the number of independent candidates fell from 14 to 11. The Liberal Democrats maintained a total of eight candidates and Labour a total of seven as they both had in 2017. For the first time, the Alba Party (three) fielded candidates in Angus.

== Results ==
2022 Angus Council election result
Party	Seats	Gains	Losses	Net gain/loss	Seats %	Votes %	Votes	+/−
SNP	13	4	0	▲4	46.43	38.3	16,025	▲7.1
Conservative	7	0	1	▼1	25.00	26.6	11,142	▼7.3
Independent	7	0	2	▼2	25.00	19.0	7,932	▼6.0
Labour	1	1	0	▲1	3.57	6.9	2,870	▲1.5
Liberal Democrats	0	0	2	▼2	0.00	5.1	2,133	▲0.5
Green	0	0	0	Steady	0.00	3.4	1,436	New
Alba	0	0	0	Steady	0.00	0.7	276	New
Total	28						41,814	

Note: Votes are the sum of first preference votes across all council wards. The net gain/loss and percentage changes relate to the result of the previous Scottish local elections on 4 May 2017. This is because STV has an element of proportionality which is not present unless multiple seats are being elected. This may differ from other published sources showing gain/loss relative to seats held at the dissolution of Scotland's councils.

=== Ward summary ===
2022 Angus Council election by ward
Ward	%	Cllrs	%	Cllrs	%	Cllrs	%	Cllrs	%	Cllrs	Total Cllrs
Ward	SNP		Con		Ind		Lab		Others		Total Cllrs
Kirriemuir and Dean	42.0	2	38.4	1			6.7	0	12.9	0	3
Brechin and Edzell	34.1	1	32.3	1	20.4	1	7.2	0	5.9	0	3
Forfar and District	38.4	2	21.4	1	28.9	1	5.5	0	5.9	0	4
Monifieth and Sidlaw	39.7	2	30.7	1			13.5	1	16.1	0	4
Carnoustie and District	35.9	1	17.3	0	36.8	2			10.0	0	3
Arbroath West, Letham and Friockheim	36.2	2	31.4	1	17.0	1	6.5	0	9.0	0	4
Arbroath East and Lunan	41.5	1	17.7	1	31.0	1	7.0	0	2.8	0	3
Montrose and District	39.3	2	22.3	1	25.6	1	6.5	0	7.6	0	4
Total	38.3	13	26.6	7	19.0	7	6.9	1	9.2	0	28

=== Seats changing hands ===
Below is a list of seats which elected a different party or parties from 2017 in order to highlight the change in political composition of the council from the previous election. The list does not include defeated incumbents who resigned or defected from their party and subsequently failed re-election while the party held the seat.

Seats changing hands
Seat	2017		2022	
Seat	Party	Member	Party	Member
Kirriemuir and Dean	Conservative	Angus Macmillan-Douglas	SNP	George Meechan
Forfar and District	Independent	Colin Brown	SNP	Linda Clark
Monifieth and Sidlaw	Liberal Democrats	Ben Lawrie	Labour	Heather Doran
Arbroath West, Letham and Friockheim	Liberal Democrats	Richard Moore	SNP	Martin Shephard
Montrose and District	Independent	Mark Salmond	SNP	Kenny Braes

Notes

1. Note 1: Cllr Braes was councillor for Brechin and Edzell from 2017 to 2022.

== Ward results ==
=== Kirriemuir and Dean ===
The SNP retained the seat they had won at the previous election and gained one from the Conservatives while the Conservatives retained one of their two seats.

Kirriemuir and Dean – 3 seats
Party	Candidate	FPv%	Count					
Party	Candidate	FPv%	1	2	3	4	5	6
SNP	Julie Bell (incumbent)	29.3	1,321					
Conservative	Ronnie Proctor (incumbent)	21.3	962	965	1,007	1,072	1,126	1,856
Conservative	Euan Walker-Monroe	17.1	772	774	801	833	864	
SNP	George Meechan	12.7	574	728	740	792	990	1,007
Green	Ian Whyte	7.8	353	369	417	523		
Labour	Rachel Grieve	6.7	303	310	384			
Liberal Democrats	Sandra O'Shea	5.1	230	233				
Electorate: 8,907 Valid: 4,515 Spoilt: 81 Quota: 1,129 Turnout: 51.6%

=== Brechin and Edzell ===
The SNP and Conservatives retained the seats they had won at the previous election while independent candidate Jill Scott gained a seat from retiring independent councillor Bob Myles.

Brechin and Edzell – 3 seats
Party	Candidate	FPv%	Count		
Party	Candidate	FPv%	1	2	3
SNP	Chris Beattie	34.1	1,341		
Conservative	Gavin Nicol (incumbent)	32.3	1,271		
Independent	Jill Scott	20.4	804	914	1,020
Labour	Dawn Barrowman	7.2	283	356	390
Liberal Democrats	Alison Andrews	6.0	234	293	363
Electorate: 8,877 Valid: 3,933 Spoilt: 54 Quota: 984 Turnout: 44.9%

=== Forfar and District ===
The SNP and Conservatives retained the seats they had won at the previous election while the SNP gained one seat from independent candidate Colin Brown.

Forfar and District – 4 seats
Party	Candidate	FPv%	Count							
Party	Candidate	FPv%	1	2	3	4	5	6	7	8
SNP	Linda Clark	23.4	1,270							
Conservative	Ross Greig	21.4	1,158							
Independent	Ian McLaren (incumbent)	16.0	869	872	893	925	959	961	1,082	1,709
SNP	Lynne Devine (incumbent)	14.9	810	973	976	984	1,098			
Independent	Colin Brown (incumbent)	12.9	698	702	716	727	754	756	833	
Labour	Ed McAdam	5.5	298	300	309	334	366	368		
Green	Marley Hunter	4.2	228	235	237	249				
Liberal Democrats	Samuel Struth	1.7	90	91	99					
Electorate: 12,325 Valid: 5,421 Spoilt: 107 Quota: 1,085 Turnout: 44.9%

=== Monifieth and Sidlaw ===
The SNP (2) and the Conservatives (1) retained the seats they had won at the previous election while Labour gained a seat from the Liberal Democrats.

Monifieth and Sidlaw – 4 seats
Party	Candidate	FPv%	Count							
Party	Candidate	FPv%	1	2	3	4	5	6	7	8
Conservative	Craig Fotheringham (incumbent)	23.2	1,670							
SNP	Lloyd Melville	21.7	1,562							
SNP	Beth Whiteside (incumbent)	18.0	1,294	1,297	1,401	1,427	1,557			
Labour	Heather Doran	13.4	968	980	984	988	1,033	1,060	1,199	1,791
Liberal Democrats	Ben Lawrie (incumbent)	11.2	804	825	829	835	907	930	1,150	
Conservative	Calum Nicol	7.5	542	724	724	730	743	745		
Green	James Whitehead	4.0	287	288	292	300				
Alba	Blake Sharp	0.9	67	67	68					
Electorate: 14,214 Valid: 7,194 Spoilt: 132 Quota: 1,439 Turnout: 51.5%

=== Carnoustie and District ===
The SNP and independent candidates David Cheape and Brian Boyd retained the seats they had won at the previous election.

Carnoustie and District – 3 seats
Party	Candidate	FPv%	Count					
Party	Candidate	FPv%	1	2	3	4	5	6
SNP	Mark McDonald (incumbent)	35.9	1,939					
Independent	David Cheape (incumbent)	19.1	1,034	1,108	1,148	1,212	1,326	1,684
Independent	Brian Boyd (incumbent)	17.7	956	1,033	1,060	1,097	1,187	1,449
Conservative	Robert Galloway	17.3	933	944	949	997	1,028	
Liberal Democrats	Matthias Glenday	4.5	242	272	286			
Green	Robbie Kelly	3.2	174	359	429	504		
Alba	Laura Tierney	2.3	123	202				
Electorate: 11,206 Valid: 5,401 Spoilt: 70 Quota: 1,351 Turnout: 48.8%

=== Arbroath West, Letham and Friockheim ===
The SNP, Conservatives and independent candidate David Fairweather retained the seats they had won at the previous election while the SNP gained a seat from the Liberal Democrats.

Arbroath West, Letham and Friockheim – 4 seats
Party	Candidate	FPv%	Count									
Party	Candidate	FPv%	1	2	3	4	5	6	7	8	9	10
Conservative	Louise Nicol	25.6	1,663									
SNP	Serena Cowdy	22.1	1,440									
SNP	Martin Shephard	14.0	913	915	1,027	1,058	1,136	1,161	1,236	1,337		
Independent	Ian Wren	8.9	578	585	587	599	617	665	749			
Independent	David Fairweather (incumbent)	8.1	524	538	541	556	589	635	752	1,013	1,021	1,320
Labour	Pamela Ruddy	6.5	423	433	434	438	464	560				
Conservative	Juliet Vivers	5.8	376	671	671	674	683	729	807	895	896	
Liberal Democrats	Rod Falconer	4.4	286	297	299	302	338					
Green	Anne Campbell	3.3	214	216	227	241						
Alba	Lisa Keogh	1.3	86	86	89							
Electorate: 14,052 Valid: 6,503 Spoilt: 98 Quota: 1,301 Turnout: 47.0%

=== Arbroath East and Lunan ===
The SNP, Conservatives and independent candidate Lois Speed retained the seats they had won at the previous election.

Arbroath East and Lunan – 3 seats
Party	Candidate	FPv%	Count					
Party	Candidate	FPv%	1	2	3	4	5	6
Independent	Lois Speed (incumbent)	31.0	1,177					
SNP	Brenda Durno (incumbent)	28.6	1,085					
Conservative	Derek Wann (incumbent)	17.7	671	717	718	744	844	1,054
SNP	Graham Smith	13.0	492	548	671	688	753	
Labour	Luke Andrew Stronach	7.0	265	303	306	371		
Liberal Democrats	Jane Atkins	2.8	108	139	142			
Electorate: 10,486 Valid: 3,798 Spoilt: 76 Quota: 950 Turnout: 36.9%

=== Montrose and District ===
The SNP, Conservatives and independent candidate Tommy Stewart retained the seats they had won at the previous election while the SNP gained a seat from independent candidate Mark Salmond.

Montrose and District – 4 seats
Party	Candidate	FPv%	Count								
Party	Candidate	FPv%	1	2	3	4	5	6	7	8	9
Conservative	Iain Gall	22.3	1,124								
SNP	Kenny Braes (Note: Sitting councillor for Brechin and Edzell.)	21.6	1,090								
SNP	Bill Duff (incumbent)	17.7	894	896	966	972	976	1,059			
Independent	Tommy Stewart (incumbent)	14.5	732	749	750	763	784	808	815	903	1,377
Independent	Mark Salmond (incumbent)	9.9	499	532	534	554	587	612	620	729	
Labour	John Ruddy	6.5	330	341	342	344	392	426	433		
Green	Jamie Adams	3.6	180	183	185	192	209				
Liberal Democrats	Angela Noble	2.7	139	154	155	163					
Independent	James Boag	1.2	61	66	66						
Electorate: 12,016 Valid: 5,049 Spoilt: 84 Quota: 1,010 Turnout: 42.7%

== Aftermath ==
Following the election, the outgoing Conservative–Liberal Democrat–independent administration was replaced after the SNP group formed a coalition with independent councillors Brian Boyd and David Cheape. At the first meeting of the new council on 24 May 2022, SNP councillor Beth Whiteside was elected as leader of the council – the first woman to hold the role – replacing independent councillor David Fairweather. Cllr Boyd was elected as Provost – the first openly gay man to hold the role – and Cllr Linda Clark was elected deputy Provost. Provost Boyd said the new council should seek to end the "petty politics that have blighted Angus Council in its entirety".

In July 2024, Cllr Boyd resigned as Provost after behaviour which he described as falling "below personal standards". Cllr Boyd was called "an absolute disgrace" and "a bully" after interrupting Cllr Lois Speed and making her cry.

Cllr Whiteside stood down as council leader and as leader of the SNP group in August 2024 for personal reasons. Cllr George Meechan temporarily stood in as council leader before Cllr Bill Duff was elected as council leader the following month.

Cllr Serena Cowdy resigned from the SNP to sit as an independent in September 2024 citing concerns with the party's environmental policies.

In April 2025, Cllr Meechan – who had been elected as deputy leader of the council after the previous change in council leadership – quit the SNP before resigning as deputy leader of the council. The SNP-led administration eventually collapsed and was replaced by a Conservative–Labour–independent coalition. As a result, Cllr Meechan was installed as council leader.

=== Arbroath West, Letham and Friockheim by-election ===
In October 2023, former council leader and Arbroath West, Letham and Friockheim councillor David Fairweather announced his intention to retire from the council. He formally stood down in February 2024 and a by-election was held on 25 April 2024. The seat was won by the Conservative candidate, Jack Cruickshanks.

Arbroath West, Letham and Friockheim by-election (25 April 2024) – 1 seat
Party	Candidate	FPv%	Count				
Party	Candidate	FPv%	1	2	3	4	5
Conservative	Jack Cruickshanks	41.9	1,682	1,691	1,759	1,997	2,450
SNP	Kathleen Wolf	29.3	1,175	1,237	1,279	1,467	
Labour	Mark Hilton	16.0	644	676	833		
Liberal Democrats	Sandra O'Shea	8.3	333	375			
Green	Mark David Findlay	4.4	176				
Electorate: 13,810 Valid: 4,010 Spoilt: 45 Quota: 2,006 Turnout: 29.4%
