= Angus Council =

Governing council in Angus, Scotland, UK

Angus Council Comhairle Aonghais
- Coat of arms

- Council logo

Type
- Type: Unitary authority

Leadership
- Provost: Craig Fotheringham, Conservative since 8 May 2025
- Leader: George Meechan, Independent since 22 April 2025
- Chief Executive: Kathryn Lindsay since 1 January 2024

Structure
- Seats: 28 councillors
- Graph of the party split among 28 seats.
- Political groups: Administration (13) Conservative (8) Labour (1) Independent (4) Other parties (15) SNP (11) Independent (4)
- Length of term: Full council elected every 5 years

Elections
- Voting system: Single transferable vote
- Last election: 5 May 2022
- Next election: 6 May 2027

Meeting place
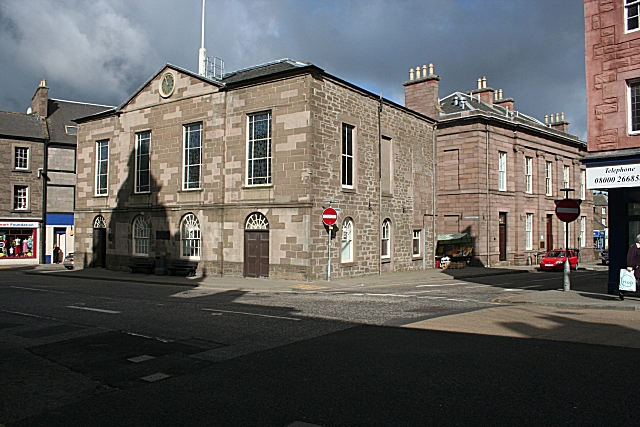
- Town and County Hall, 26 Castle Street, Forfar, DD8 1BA

Website
- www.angus.gov.uk

Angus Council (Scottish Gaelic: Comhairle Aonghais) is the local authority for Angus, one of the 32 council areas of Scotland. The council is based in Forfar. It has been under no overall control since 2017. A minority administration comprising the Conservatives, Labour and some of the independent councillors formed to run the council in April 2025.

== History ==
Angus was one of Scotland's historic counties and had a county council from 1890 until 1975. The county was called Forfarshire until 1928 when the name was changed to Angus, being the name of the ancient province which had covered the same area as the later county.

In 1975 Angus became a district within the Tayside region, with Angus District Council serving as a lower-tier authority subordinate to Tayside Regional Council. The regions and districts were abolished in 1996, when Angus became a council area, governed by Angus Council, which took on all the local government functions previously performed by the district and regional councils. There were some adjustments to the boundaries of Angus with the neighbouring city of Dundee as part of both the 1975 and 1996 reforms.

== Governance ==
=== Political control ===
The council has been under no overall control since 2017. Following both the 2017 and 2022 elections, the Scottish National Party formed minority administrations to run the council. In April 2025, the SNP administration lost a vote of no confidence and was replaced by a new minority administration comprising the Conservatives, Labour and four of the independent councillors, led by independent councillor George Meechan, who had been deputy leader of the council's SNP group until he left the party earlier in April 2025.

The first election to Angus District Council was held in 1974, initially operating as a shadow authority alongside the outgoing authorities until the new system came into force on 16 May 1975. A shadow authority was again elected in 1995 ahead of the reforms which came into force on 1 April 1996. Political control of the council since 1975 has been as follows:

Angus District Council
Party in control	Years
No overall control	1975–1977
Conservative	1977–1980
No overall control	1980–1984
SNP	1984–1996

Angus Council
Party in control	Years
SNP	1996–2007
No overall control	2007–2012
SNP	2012–2017
No overall control	2017–present

=== Leadership ===
The role of provost is largely ceremonial in Angus. They chair full council meetings and act as the council's civic figurehead. Political leadership is provided by the leader of the council. The leaders since 1996 have been:

Councillor	Party	From	To
Ian Hudghton	SNP	1 Apr 1996	1998
Rob Murray	SNP	1998	2007
Bob Myles	Independent	May 2007	2012
Iain Gaul	SNP	15 May 2012	May 2017
Bob Myles	Independent	16 May 2017	24 Apr 2018
David Fairweather	Independent	14 Jun 2018	May 2022
Beth Whiteside	SNP	26 May 2022	29 Jul 2024
Bill Duff	SNP	10 Sep 2024	22 Apr 2025
George Meechan	Independent	22 Apr 2025	

=== Composition ===
Following the 2022 election and subsequent by-elections and changes of allegiance up to October 2026, the composition of the council was:

Party	Seats
SNP	11
Conservative	8
Labour	1
Independent	8
Total	28

Four of the independent councillors form part of the council's administration with the Conservatives and Labour. The next election is due in 2027.

== Elections ==
Election results since 1995 have been as follows:

Year	Seats	SNP	Independent / Other	Conservative	Labour	Liberal Democrats	Notes
1995	26	21	1	2	0	2	
1999	29	21	3	2	1	2	
2003	29	17	6	2	1	3	
2007	29	13	6	5	2	3	
2012	29	15	8	4	1	1	
2017	28	9	9	8	0	2	
2022	28	13	7	7	1	0	

=== Wards ===
Map of the area's wards (2017 configuration)

Angus is divided into 8 wards:

Ward Number	Ward Name	Location	Seats
1	Kirriemuir and Dean		3
2	Brechin and Edzell		3
3	Forfar and District		4
4	Monifieth and Sidlaw		4
5	Carnoustie and District		3
6	Arbroath West, Letham and Friockheim		4
7	Arbroath East and Lunan		3
8	Montrose and District		4

== Premises ==
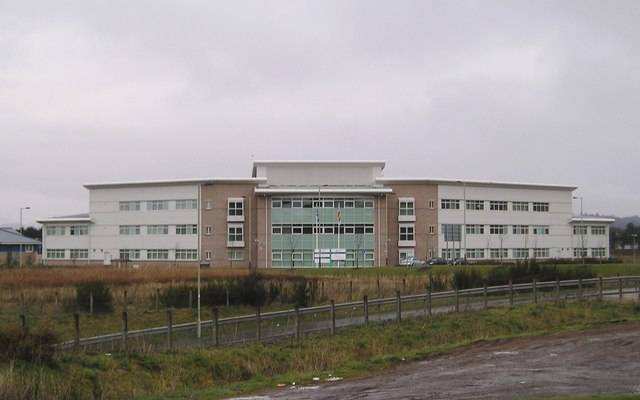
Angus House, Orchardbank, Forfar, DD8 1AN: Angus Council's main offices since 2007

Council meetings are generally held at Forfar Town and County Hall at The Cross in the centre of Forfar. In 2007 the council moved its main offices to a new building called Angus House on Silvie Way in the Orchardbank Business Park on the outskirts of Forfar. The council also has offices in Arbroath.

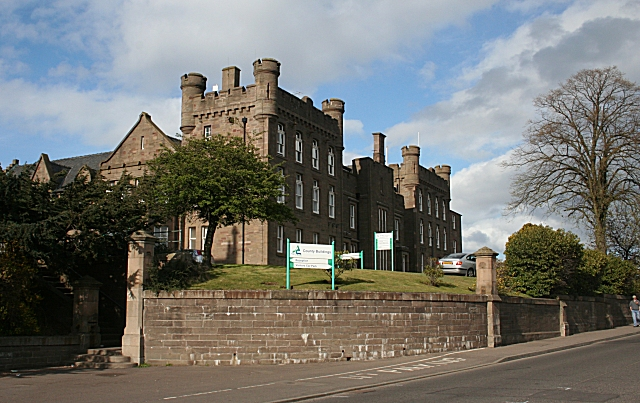
County Buildings: County Council's headquarters 1890–1975, then District Council's headquarters 1975–1996

Previously the council's main offices had been at County Buildings, on Market Street in Forfar. When the county council was established in 1890 the name County Buildings was used for the Forfar Sheriff Court, built 1871, which was the council's first meeting place. The council later moved its main offices into the adjoining converted former prison of 1843, which subsequently became known as County Buildings instead. County Buildings continued to serve as the headquarters of the county council until 1975 and the successor Angus District Council from 1975 to 1996. County Buildings continues to be used as secondary offices by the modern Angus Council.
