= 2017 Angus Council election =

2017 Scottish local government election

← 2012	4 May 2017	2022 →

All 28 seats to Angus Council 15 seats needed for a majority
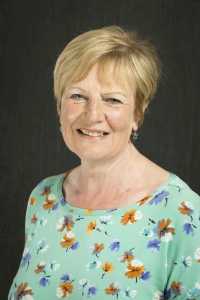

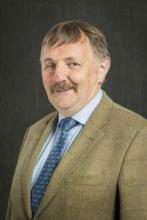

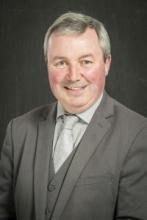

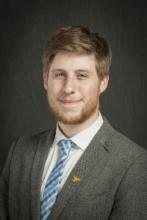

	First party	Second party	Third party
Leader	Lynne Devine	Bob Myles	Craig Fotheringham
Party	SNP	Independent	Conservative
Leader's seat	Forfar and District	Brechin and Edzell	Monifieth and Sidlaw
Last election	13 seats, 44.8%	6 seats, 20.7%	5 seats, 17.2%
Seats before	15	8	4
Seats won	9	9	8
Seat change	▼6	▲1	▲4
Popular vote	12,657	10,144	13,741
Percentage	31.2%	25.0%	33.9%
	Fourth party	Fifth party
Leader	Ben Lawrie	Margaret Thomson
Party	Liberal Democrats	Labour
Leader's seat	Monifieth and Sidlaw	Monifieth and Sidlaw (retired)
Last election	3 seat, 10.3%	2 seats, 6.9%
Seats before	1	1
Seats won	2	0
Seat change	▲1	▼1
Popular vote	1,873	2,178
Percentage	4.6%	5.4%
- The multi-member wards

Council Leader before election
Iain Gaul
SNP
Council Leader after election
Bob Myles
Independent

Elections to Angus Council were held on 4 May 2017, the same day as the other Scottish local government elections. The election used the eight wards, created under the Local Governance (Scotland) Act 2004, with each ward electing three or four councillors using the single transferable vote system, form of proportional representation. A total of 28 councillors were elected, one less than in 2012.

Following the 2012 election the Scottish National Party formed the administration on the Council. Cllr Ian Gaul (Kirriemuir and Dean) was appointed Leader of the Council at the subsequent statutory meeting; Cllr Paul Valentine (Montrose) became Depute Leader; and Cllr Helen Oswald (Carnoustie and District) was elected Provost.

== Election result ==
Angus local election result 2017
Party	Seats	Gains	Losses	Net gain/loss	Seats %	Votes %	Votes	+/−
SNP	9	0	6	-6	32.1	31.2	12,657	-13.2
Independent	9	1	0	+1	32.1	25.0	10,144	+0.2
Conservative	8	4	0	+4	28.6	33.9	13,741	+16.1
Liberal Democrats	2	2	1	+1	7.1	4.6	1,873	-1.2
Labour	0	0	1	-1	0	5.4	2,178	-2.0

Note: "Votes" are the first preference votes. The net gain/loss and percentage changes relate to the result of the previous Scottish local elections on 3 May 2012. This may differ from other published sources showing gain/loss relative to seats held at dissolution of Scotland's councils.

== Ward results ==
=== Kirriemuir and Dean ===
- 2012: 2 x SNP, 1 x Conservative
- 2017: 2 x Conservative, 1 x SNP
- 2012-2017 Change: 1 x Conservative gain from SNP

Kirriemuir and Dean - 3 seats
Party	Candidate	FPv%	Count	
Party	Candidate	FPv%	1	2
Conservative	Ronnie Proctor (incumbent)	30.52%	1,397	
SNP	Julie Bell	27.09%	1,240	
Conservative	Angus Macmillan-Douglas	24.43%	1,118	1,319
SNP	Jeanette Gaul (incumbent)	9.02%	413	421
Liberal Democrats	Liz Petrie	4.50%	206	219
Labour	Gordon Watson	4.44%	203	211
Electorate: TBC Valid: 4,577 Spoilt: 117 Quota: 1,145 Turnout: 52.9%

=== Brechin and Edzell ===
- 2012: 2 x SNP, 1 x Independent
- 2017: 1 x SNP, 1 x Independent, 1 x Conservative
- 2012-2017 Change: 1 x Conservative gain from SNP

Brechin and Edzell - 3 seats
Party	Candidate	FPv%	Count						
Party	Candidate	FPv%	1	2	3	4	5	6	7
Conservative	Gavin Nicol	30.42%	1,281						
Independent	Bob Myles (incumbent)	18.81%	792	882	930	977	988	988	1,544
SNP	Kenny Braes	18.10%	762	765	776	794	1,055		
Independent	Jill Scott	17.48%	736	777	812	882	906	907	
SNP	Paul Wright*	7.31%	308	310	311	332			
Labour	Marjory Smith	4.82%	203	216	241				
Liberal Democrats	Alison Andrews	3.06%	129	153					
Electorate: TBC Valid: 4,211 Spoilt: 69 Quota: 1,053 Turnout: 47.4%

*Disendorsed by the SNP prior to polling day, but appeared on ballot paper as SNP candidate.

=== Forfar and District ===
- 2012: 2 x SNP, 2 x Independent
- 2017: 2 x Independent, 1 x SNP, 1 x Conservative
- 2012-2017 Change: 1 x Conservative gain from SNP

Forfar and District - 4 seats
Party	Candidate	FPv%	Count						
Party	Candidate	FPv%	1	2	3	4	5	6	7
Conservative	Braden Davy	24.14%	1,333						
Independent	Colin Brown (incumbent)	19.66%	1,086	1,144					
SNP	Lynne Devine (incumbent)	17.64%	974	978	980	997	1,025	1,086	1,105
Independent	Ian McLaren (incumbent)	14.63%	808	861	883	920	990	1,253	
SNP	Glennis Middleton (incumbent)	10.47%	578	581	582	589	597	644	656
Independent	Ian Whyte	7.82%	432	452	459	476	516		
Labour	Ed McAdam	3.58%	198	213	214	250			
Liberal Democrats	Glen Barclay	2.06%	114	137	138				
Electorate: TBC Valid: 5,523 Spoilt: 97 Quota: 1,105 Turnout: 47.1%

=== Monifieth and Sidlaw ===
- 2012: 2 x SNP, 1 x Conservative, 1 x Labour
- 2017: 2 x SNP, 1 x Conservative 1 x Liberal Democrat
- 2012-2017 Change: 1 x Liberal Democrat gain from Labour

Monifieth and Sidlaw - 4 seats
Party	Candidate	FPv%	Count				
Party	Candidate	FPv%	1	2	3	4	5
Conservative	Craig Fotheringham (incumbent)	43.40%	2,901				
SNP	Sheila Hands (incumbent)	25.83%	1,727				
Liberal Democrats	Ben Lawrie	11.88%	794	1,477			
Labour	Ray Strachan	9.62%	643	863	878	948	
SNP	Beth Whiteside	9.27%	620	660	1,005	1,021	1,254
Electorate: TBC Valid: 6,685 Spoilt: 111 Quota: 1,338 Turnout: 50.8%

=== Carnoustie and District ===
- 2012: 2 x Independent, 1 x SNP
- 2017: 2 x Independent, 1 x SNP
- 2012-2017 Change: No Change

Carnoustie and District - 3 seats
Party	Candidate	FPv%	Count						
Party	Candidate	FPv%	1	2	3	4	5	6	7
SNP	Mark McDonald	26.78%	1,359						
Independent	Brian Boyd (incumbent)	18.09%	918	930	948	1,000	1,271		
Independent	David Cheape (incumbent)	17.91%	909	924	937	1,014	1,224	1,226	1,643
Conservative	Terry O'Halloran	17.71%	899	901	919	978	1,038	1,038	
Independent	Bill Bowles (incumbent)	11.21%	569	581	587	647			
Labour	Joanne McFadden	6.92%	351	361	380				
Liberal Democrats	Beth Morrison	1.38%	70	77					
Electorate: TBC Valid: 5,075 Spoilt: 49 Quota: 1,269 Turnout: 47.6%

=== Arbroath West, Letham and Friockheim ===
- 2012: 2 x SNP, 1 x Conservative, 1 x Independent
- 2017: 1 x SNP, 1 x Conservative, 1 x Independent, 1 x Liberal Democrat
- 2012-2017 Change: 1 X Liberal Democrat gain from SNP

Arbroath West, Letham and Friockheim - 4 seats
Party	Candidate	FPv%	Count				
Party	Candidate	FPv%	1	2	3	4	5
Conservative	David Lumgair (incumbent)	42.32%	2,585				
Independent	David Fairweather (incumbent)	23.98%	1,465				
SNP	Alex King (incumbent)	19.75%	1,206	1,251			
SNP	Donald Morrison (incumbent) *	8.61%	526	545	589	614	
Liberal Democrats	Richard Moore	5.34%	326	979	1,076	1,077	1,323
Electorate: TBC Valid: 6,108 Spoilt: 105 Quota: 1,222 Turnout: 45.2%

* Sitting Councillor for Arbroath East and Lunan Ward.

=== Arbroath East and Lunan ===
- 2012: 2 x SNP, 1 x Independent, 1 x Conservative
- 2017: 1 x Conservative, 1 x Independent, 1 x SNP
- 2012-2017 Change: 1 x SNP loss due to there being one less seat than 2012.

Arbroath East and Lunan - 3 seats
Party	Candidate	FPv%	Count						
Party	Candidate	FPv%	1	2	3	4	5	6	7
Conservative	Derek Wann	24.4%	852	860	866	901			
SNP	Brenda Durno (incumbent)	22.5%	786	791	793	822	823	841	879
Independent	Lois Speed	21.9%	763	773	798	858	865	1,071	
SNP	Sheena Welsh (incumbent)	12.8%	446	447	449	466	467	480	502
Labour	John Ruddy	7.4%	257	261	263				
Independent	Kevin Smith	7.3%	254	268	293	348	356		
Independent	Ian Watson	2.1%	72	74					
Liberal Democrats	Mark Smith	1.6%	56						
Electorate: 10,054 Valid: 3,486 Spoilt: 63 Quota: 872 Turnout: 35.3%

=== Montrose and District ===
- 2012: 2 x SNP, 1 x Independent, 1 x Liberal Democrat
- 2017: 1 x SNP, 1 x Conservative, 2 x Independent
- 2012-2017 Change:1 x Conservative gain from SNP, 1 x Independent gain from Liberal Democrats

Montrose and District - 4 seats
Party	Candidate	FPv%	Count					
Party	Candidate	FPv%	1	2	3	4	5	6
Conservative	Ron Sturrock	27.9%	1,375					
SNP	Bill Duff (incumbent)	23.2%	1,142					
Independent	Mark Salmond (incumbent)	13.9%	687	797	809	867	983	1,175
Independent	Tommy Stewart	13.2%	653	727	732	770	852	1,011
SNP	Gill Stranock	11.6%	570	574	692	715	768	
Labour	Pamela Ruddy	6.6%	323	358	365	428		
Liberal Democrats	Avril Simpson	3.6%	178	240	242			
Electorate: 12,058 Valid: 4,928 Spoilt: 88 Quota: 986 Turnout: 41.6%
