= 2007 Angus Council election =

2007 Scottish local government election

- 3 May 2007

All 29 seats to Angus Council 15 seats needed for a majority

Elections to Angus Council were held on 3 May 2007 the same day as the other Scottish local government elections and the Scottish Parliament general election. The election was the first one using 8 new wards created as a result of the Local Governance (Scotland) Act 2004, each ward will elect three or four councillors using the single transferable vote system form of proportional representation. The new wards replace 29 single-member wards which used the plurality (first past the post) system of election.

== Election result ==
Angus local election result 2007
Party	Seats	Gains	Losses	Net gain/loss	Seats %	Votes %	Votes	+/−
SNP	13	N/A	N/A	–4	44.8	38.3	17,255	
Conservative	5	N/A	N/A	+3	17.2	19.1	8,609	
Liberal Democrats	3	N/A	N/A	±0	10.3	9.7	4,391	
Labour	2	N/A	N/A	+1	6.9	11.8	5,307	
Solidarity	0	N/A	N/A	±0	0.0	0.1	62	
Independent	6	N/A	N/A	±0	20.7	20.9	9,412	

== Ward results ==
2007 Council election: Kirriemuir and Dean
Party	Candidate	FPv%	%	Seat	Count
Conservative	Ian Mackintosh	2,343	47.1	1	1
SNP	Iain Gaul	1,223	24.6	2	2
SNP	Christine Urquhart	544	10.9		
Labour	Derek David Ramsay	462	9.3		
Liberal Democrats	Alison Andrews	398	8.0	3	5

2007 Council election: Brechin and Edzell
Party	Candidate	FPv%	%	Seat	Count
Independent	Ruth Leslie Melville	971	22.1	1	4
Independent	Bob Myles	798	18.1	2	6
SNP	Mairi Evans	765	17.4	3	8
SNP	Joy Mowatt	706	16.1		
Conservative	Elaine Milne	373	8.5		
Independent	David Adam	313	7.1		
Labour	Ron Thoms	286	6.5		
Liberal Democrats	Helen Fleming	185	4.2		

2007 Council election: Forfar and District
Party	Candidate	FPv%	%	Seat	Count
Independent	Colin Brown	1,782	30.1	1	1
SNP	Glennis Middleton	1,111	18.8	2	3
SNP	William Middleton	1,053	17.8	3	5
Conservative	John Rymer	878	14.8	4	7
Labour	Mitch Cameron	526	8.9		
Liberal Democrats	Avril Simpson	495	8.4		
Independent	John Phillip	76	1.3		

2007 Council election: Monifieth and Sidlaw
Party	Candidate	FPv%	%	Seat	Count
SNP	Frank Ellis	2,604	34.5	1	1
SNP	Rob Murray	1,496	19.8	2	2
Conservative	John R Whyte	1,396	18.5	3	3
Labour	Margaret Thomson	1,040	13.8	4	6
Liberal Democrats	Elizabeth Petrie	544	7.2		
Independent	Craig Fotheringham	473	6.3		

2007 Council election: Carnoustie and District
Party	Candidate	FPv%	%	Seat	Count
SNP	Helen Oswald	1,837	34.6	1	1
Labour	Peter Murphy	1,160	21.8	2	4
Conservative	John Richard Hillman	863	16.3		
Liberal Democrats	Eddie Wilmott	748	14.1		
SNP	Ralph Palmer	639	12.0	3	6
Solidarity	Alan Manley	62	1.2		

2007 Council election: Arbroath West and Letham
Party	Candidate	FPv%	%	Seat	Count
Conservative	David Lumgair	1,322	21.4	1	1
SNP	Alex King	1,169	18.9	3	6
Independent	David Fairweather	1,117	18.1	2	4
Liberal Democrats	Peter Nield	857	13.9	4	8
Labour	Joan Warren	627	10.2		
SNP	Brian Milne	565	9.1		
Independent	Anne Marie Sim	485	7.9		
Independent	Rob Pearce	35	0.6		

2007 Council election: Arbroath East and Lunan
Party	Candidate	FPv%	%	Seat	Count
SNP	Sheena Welsh	1,282	24.7	1	1
Independent	Robert Ritchie Spink	1,041	20.0	2	1
Conservative	Jim Millar	789	15.2	3	6
Labour	Alastair John Stuart	677	13.0		
SNP	Donald Morrison	620	11.9	4	6
Liberal Democrats	Ginny Graham	504	9.7		
Independent	Ian Watson	281	5.4		

2007 Council election: Montrose and District
Party	Candidate	FPv%	%	Seat	Count
Independent	Mark Salmond	1,550	28.1	1	1
SNP	Sandy West	832	15.1	4	5
SNP	Paul Valentine	809	14.7	3	5
Liberal Democrats	David May	660	12.0	2	5
Conservative	Ingram Bruce	645	11.7		
Labour	James Sinclair	529	9.6		
Independent	Joe Wishart	490	8.9		

== By-Elections since 3 May 2007 ==
- A by-election was held in the Monifieth & Sidlaw Ward on 25 June 2009 following the death of the SNP's Frank Ellis. This was won by the SNP's Jean Lee

Monifieth & Sidlaw by-election 25 June 2009 - 1 Seat
Party	Candidate	FPv%	Count
Party	Candidate	FPv%	1
SNP	Jean Lee	68.62	2,486
Conservative	Craig Robert Fotheringham	19.27	698
Liberal Democrats	Charles William Donald Goodall	12.12	439
SNP hold		Swing	
Valid: 3,623 Spoilt: 34 Quota: 1,829 Turnout: 3,657

- A by-election was held in the Carnoustie & District Ward on 3 February 2011 following the resignation of the SNP's Ralph Palmer. This was won by the Independent Brian Boyd

Carnoustie & District by-election 3 February 2011 - 1 Seat
Party	Candidate	FPv%	Count				
Party	Candidate	FPv%	1	2	3	4	5
SNP	Ed Oswald	41.46	1,289	1,302	1,346	1,426	
Independent	Brian Boyd	40.27	1,252	1,290	1,370	1,454	2,113
Labour	Ron Thoms	8.3	258	266	287		
Conservative	Eddie Wilmott	7.0	217	234			
Liberal Democrats	Charles Goodall	2.9	93				
Independent gain from SNP		Swing					
Electorate: 10,090 Valid: 3,109 Spoilt: 19 Quota: 1,555 Turnout: 3,128
