= 2012 Angus Council election =

2012 Scottish local government election

- 3 May 2012

All 29 seats to Angus Council 15 seats needed for a majority
	First party	Second party	Third party
Leader	Iain Gaul	No appointed group leader
Party	SNP	Independent	Conservative
Leader's seat	Kirriemuir and Dean
Last election	13 seats, 44.8%	6 seats, 20.7%	5 seats, 17.2%
Seats before	13	6	5
Seats won	15	8	4
Seat change	▲2	▲2	▼1
	Fourth party	Fifth party
Leader	Margaret Thomson	David May
Party	Labour	Liberal Democrats
Leader's seat	Monifieth and Sidlaw	Montrose and District
Last election	2 seats, 6.9%	3 seat, 10.3%
Seats before	2	3
Seats won	1	1
Seat change	▼1	▼2
- The multi-member wards
Council Leader before election
Bob Myles
Independent
Council Leader after election
Iain Gaul
SNP

Elections to Angus Council were held on 3 May 2012 the same day as the other Scottish local government elections. The election used the eight wards, created as a result of the Local Governance (Scotland) Act 2004, with each ward electing three or four councillors using the single transferable vote system form of proportional representation, with 29 Councillors being elected.

The 2007 election saw the Scottish National Party lose majority control on the council. In their stead the Angus Alliance took over the leadership of the council made up of all parties and groupings opposed to the SNP. Two independent councillors (one elected in 2007, the other elected at a by-election in 2011) remained outside the Angus Alliance.

The 2012 election saw the SNP gain two additional seats and regain their overall majority on the council. Independents also increased their overall numbers and became the second largest grouping while all other parties; the Scottish Conservative and Unionist Party, Labour and the Scottish Liberal Democrats lost seats. The Conservative and Unionist Party are the second largest political party represented on the council.

Following the election the Scottish National Party formed the administration on the council. Cllr Ian Gaul (Kirriemuir and Dean) was appointed leader of the council at the subsequent statutory meeting, Cllr Paul Valentine (Montrose) Depute Leader. Cllr Helen Oswald (Carnoustie and District) was elected Provost.

== Election result ==
Angus local election result 2012
Party	Seats	Gains	Losses	Net gain/loss	Seats %	Votes %	Votes	+/−
SNP	15	3	1	▲2	51.72	44.38	14,689	▲6.08
Independent	8	3	1	▲2	27.59	24.24	8,023	▲3.34
Conservative	4	0	1	▼1	13.79	17.71	5,863	▼1.39
Labour	1	0	1	▼1	3.45	7.34	2,429	▼4.46
Liberal Democrats	1	0	2	▼2	3.45	5.77	1,911	▼3.93

Note: "Votes" are the first preference votes. The net gain/loss and percentage changes relate to the result of the previous Scottish local elections on 3 May 2007. This may differ from other published sources showing gain/loss relative to seats held at dissolution of Scotland's councils.

== Ward results ==
=== Kirriemuir and Dean ===
- 2007: 1xCon; 1xSNP; 1xLib Dem
- 2012: 2xSNP; 1xCon
- 2007-2012 Change: SNP gain one seat from Lib Dem

Kirriemuir and Dean – 3 seats
Party	Candidate	FPv%	Count			
Party	Candidate	FPv%	1	2	3	4
Conservative	Ronnie Proctor	39.99	1,375			
SNP	Iain Gaul (incumbent)	37.84	1,301			
Liberal Democrats	Alison Andrews (incumbent)	12.48	429	691.9	717.7	
SNP	Jeanette Gaul	9.69	333	389.9	783.5	1,034.9
Electorate: 8,264 Valid: 3,438 Spoilt: 78 Quota: 860 Turnout: 3,516 (41.6%)

=== Brechin and Edzell ===
- 2007: 2xIndependent; 1xSNP
- 2012: 2xSNP; 1xIndependent
- 2007-2012 Change: SNP gain one seat from Independent

Brechin and Edzell – 3 seats
Party	Candidate	FPv%	Count				
Party	Candidate	FPv%	1	2	3	4	5
SNP	Mairi Evans (incumbent)	35.36	1,145				
Independent	Bob Myles (incumbent)	19.49	631	641.8	666.9	878.2	
Conservative	Jane Ferguson	15.01	486	495.7	533.4	617.7	645.6
SNP	Jim Houston	14.18	459	736.6	752.9	799.1	812.1
Independent	Douglas Murray	12.04	390	400.8	429.4		
Liberal Democrats	Janet Cowan	3.92	127	133.1			
Electorate: 8,386 Valid: 3,238 Spoilt: 62 Quota: 810 Turnout: 3,300 (38.61%)

=== Forfar and District ===
- 2007: 2xSNP; 1xIndependent; 1xCon
- 2012: 2xSNP; 2xIndependent
- 2007-2012 Change: Independent gain one seat from Con

Forfar and District – 4 seats
Party	Candidate	FPv%	Count				
Party	Candidate	FPv%	1	2	3	4	5
SNP	Lynne Devine	21.8%	986				
SNP	Glennis Middleton (incumbent)	20.52%	928				
Independent	Ian McLaren	18.59%	841	855.5	859.5	890.2	972
Independent	Colin Brown (incumbent)	17.4%	787	798.3	802.4	820.9	1,050.4
Conservative	John Rymer (incumbent)	10.78%	487	490.2	491.1	526.6	546.1
Independent	Charlie Brown	7.89%	357	367	369.3	383.9	
Liberal Democrats	Avril Simpson	3.03%	137	141.4	142.6		
Electorate: 11,218 Valid: 4,523 Spoilt: 53 Quota: 905 Turnout: 4,578 (40.32%)

=== Monifieth and Sidlaw ===
- 2007: 2xSNP; 1xCon; 1xLab
- 2012: 2xSNP; 1xCon; 1xLab
- 2007-2012 Change: No change

Monifieth and Sidlaw – 4 seats
Party	Candidate	FPv%	Count				
Party	Candidate	FPv%	1	2	3	4	5
Conservative	Craig Fotheringham	21.5%	1,170				
SNP	Sheila Hands	21.32%	1,160				
SNP	Rob Murray (incumbent)	20.69%	1,126				
Labour	Margaret Thomson (incumbent)	17.64%	960	970.4	973.7	975.6	1,098.1
SNP	Sandy Ritchie	14.5%	789	796.9	855.5	887.7	933.9
Liberal Democrats	Liz Petrie	4.32%	235	266.6	269.8	270.6	
Electorate: 12,692 Valid: 5,441 Spoilt: 40 Quota: 1,089 Turnout: 5,481 (42.87%)

=== Carnoustie and District ===
- 2007: 2xSNP; 1xLab
- 2012: 2xIndependent; 1xSNP
- 2007-2012 Change: Independent gain two seats from SNP and Lab

Carnoustie and District – 3 seats
Party	Candidate	FPv%	Count					
Party	Candidate	FPv%	1	2	3	4	5	6
Independent	Brian Boyd (incumbent)	39.5%	1,750					
SNP	Helen Oswald (incumbent)†††	23.23%	1,029	1,135.4				
SNP	Fiona Gibb	13.14%	582	613.2	632.8	636.9	654.4	712.5
Independent	Bill Bowles	10.9%	483	841.4	844.7	856.2	970.4	1,084
Labour	Hamid Rasheed	6.19%	274	297.1	298.8	311.2	337.9	
Conservative	Adam Cormie	6.12%	271	299.5	299.7	306.2		
Liberal Democrats	Lorraine Barthorpe	1%	41.4	49.8	49.8			
Electorate: 9,955 Valid: 4,430 Spoilt: 54 Quota: 1,108 Turnout: 4,484 (44.5%)

=== Arbroath West and Letham ===
- 2007: 1xCon; 1xSNP; 1xIndependent; 1xLib Dem
- 2012: 2xSNP; 1xCon; 1xIndependent
- 2007-2012 Change: SNP gain one seat from Lib Dem

Arbroath West and Letham – 4 seats
Party	Candidate	FPv%	Count						
Party	Candidate	FPv%	1	2	3	4	5	6	7
SNP	Alex King (incumbent)	23.57%	1,033						
Conservative	David Lumgair (incumbent)	21.91%	960						
Independent	David Fairweather (incumbent)	17.05%	747	751.8	768.2	829.5	883.8		
SNP	Ewan Smith †	14.90%	653	785.7	791.3	812.9	851.8	852.7	894.4
Labour	Alec Mollison	9.65%	423	426.8	431.1	446.5	487.1	487.9	537.4
Independent	Peter Nield (incumbent)	4.36%	191	194.2	201.4	238.6	268.9	271.9	
Liberal Democrats	Kevin Barthorpe	4.36%	191	193.7	205.7	223.5			
Independent	Ian Watson	4.2%	184	185.2	192.9				
Electorate: 11,230 Valid: 4,382 Spoilt: 59 Quota: 877 Turnout: 4,441 (39.02%)

=== Arbroath East and Lunan ===
- 2007: 2xSNP; 1xIndependent; 1xCon
- 2012: 2xSNP; 1xIndependent; 1xCon
- 2007-2012 Change: No change

Arbroath East and Lunan – 4 seats
Party	Candidate	FPv%	Count					
Party	Candidate	FPv%	1	2	3	4	5	6
Independent	Bob Spink (incumbent)††	25.76%	955					
SNP	Sheena Welsh (incumbent)	23.15%	858					
SNP	Donald Morrison (incumbent)	20.66%	766					
Conservative	Martyn Geddes	14.76%	547	600.3	609.4	610.8	641.9	784.2
Labour	Alastair Stuart	12.73%	472	509	529.6	533.8	577.3	
Liberal Democrats	Ginny Graham	2.9%	109	142.8	153.7	155.4		
Electorate: 11,032 Valid: 3,707 Spoilt: 70 Quota: 742 Turnout: 3,777 (33.6%)

=== Montrose and District ===
- 2007: 2xSNP; 1xIndependent; 1xLib Dem
- 2012: 2xSNP; 1xIndependent; 1xLib Dem
- 2007-2012 Change: No change

Montrose and District – 4 seats
Party	Candidate	FPv%	Count					
Party	Candidate	FPv%	1	2	3	4	5	6
Independent	Mark Salmond (incumbent)	22.61%	891					
SNP	Bill Duff	20.69%	815					
SNP	Paul Michael Valentine (incumbent)	18.43%	726	743.1	764.1	821.1		
Liberal Democrats	David May (incumbent)	16.29%	642	678.2	680.9	757.7	765.1	1,119.2
Conservative	Andrew Boyd	14.37%	566	588.9	589.6	617	621.2	
Labour	Ina Paton	7.61%	300	308.4	309.1			
Electorate: 11,434 Valid: 3,940 Spoilt: 54 Quota: 789 Turnout: 3,994 (34.46%)

== Changes since 2012 election ==
- † On 26 February 2013, Ewan Smith, councillor for Arbroath West and Letham, resigned from the Scottish National Party to sit as an independent, following a dispute over schooling in Arbroath. Angus councillor Ewan Smith resigns from the SNP over schools His resignation caused the SNP to lose their majority on the council, however their administration continued.
- †† On 8 September 2016, Bob Spink resigned for health reasons.'Voice of reason' Bob Spink stands down from Angus Council Spink was an independent councillor for Arbroath East and Lunan. A by-election was held on 28 November 2016 and was won by Brenda Durno for the SNP. As a result, the SNP briefly regained their majority on the council, but it was lost after another by-election a week later.
- ††† On 13 October 2016, Helen Oswald died from cancer. Oswald was the Scottish National Party councillor for Carnoustie and District and the incumbent provost. A by-election was held on 5 December 2016 and was won by independent candidate David Cheape.

== By-elections Since 2012 ==
Arbroath East and Lunan By-election (28 November 2016) - 1 Seat
Party	Candidate	FPv%	Count					
Party	Candidate	FPv%	1	2	3	4	5	6
SNP	Brenda Durno	35.0	919	925	956	1,010	1,172	1,357
Conservative	Derek Wann	27.0	709	723	741	799	928	
Independent	Lois Speed	17.2	452	457	482	619		
Independent	Kevin Smith	11.8	309	315	352			
Labour	John Ruddy	6.7	177	191				
Liberal Democrats	Richard Moore	2.3	60					
Electorate: 12,409 Valid: 2,626 Spoilt: 42 Turnout: 21.5%

Carnoustie and District By-election (5 December 2016) - 1 Seat
Party	Candidate	FPv%	Count			
Party	Candidate	FPv%	1	2	3	4
Independent	David Cheape	43.5%	1,401	1,420	1,477	1,737
SNP	Mark McDonald	32.1%	1,033	1,043	1,078	1,117
Conservative	Derek Shaw	17.7%	568	586	606	
Labour	Ray Strachan	4.4%	141	151		
Liberal Democrats	Beth Morrison	2.3%	75			
Electorate: 10,752 Valid: 3,218 Spoilt: 28 Quota: 1,610 Turnout: 30.2%
