= List of listed buildings in Forfar, Angus =

This is a list of listed buildings in the parish of Forfar in Angus, Scotland.

== List ==
Name	Location	Date Listed	Grid Ref. (Note: Sometimes known as OSGB36, the grid reference (where provided) is based on the British national grid reference system used by the Ordnance Survey. • "Guide to National Grid". Ordnance Survey. • "Get-a-map". Ordnance Survey.)	Geo-coordinates	Notes	LB Number (Note: Historic Environment Scotland assign a unique alphanumeric identifier to each designated site in Scotland, for listed buildings this always begins with "LB", for example "LB12345".)	Image
29 West High Street				56°38′37″N 2°53′24″W	Category C(S)	31512	Upload Photo
35 West High Street				56°38′36″N 2°53′25″W	Category C(S)	31514	Upload Photo
Doig's Showroom Little Causeway				56°38′37″N 2°53′19″W	Category C(S)	31520	Upload another image
3 Little Causeway				56°38′37″N 2°53′21″W	Category B	31522	Upload Photo
5 Little Causeway				56°38′36″N 2°53′23″W	Category C(S)	31524	Upload Photo
23-33 Castle Street Royal Hotel				56°38′41″N 2°53′22″W	Category C(S)	31547	Upload Photo
10-14 Castle Street 'The Strangers' Inn'				56°38′41″N 2°53′17″W	Category C(S)	31552	Upload Photo
16-22 Castle Street				56°38′41″N 2°53′17″W	Category C(S)	31553	Upload Photo
Garden Walls, Annfield House, Off Manor Street				56°38′43″N 2°53′26″W	Category B	31559	Upload Photo
Chapel Park Primary School (Former Academy) Academy Street And High Street, Main Building				56°38′41″N 2°53′00″W	Category B	31562	Upload Photo
21, 23 Academy Street				56°38′37″N 2°53′03″W	Category C(S)	31565	Upload Photo
2 Sparrowcroft				56°38′36″N 2°53′13″W	Category C(S)	31572	Upload Photo
Ravenswood (Original House Only) New Road				56°38′31″N 2°53′23″W	Category C(S)	31579	Upload Photo
22-26 Dundee Loan				56°38′29″N 2°53′38″W	Category C(S)	31586	Upload Photo
2-10 Western Sunnyside				56°38′26″N 2°53′37″W	Category C(S)	31593	Upload Photo
Lowson Memorial Parish Church Jamieson Street				56°38′48″N 2°52′27″W	Category A	31604	Upload another image
Sheriff Court House, County Buildings, Market Street And Brechin Road				56°39′00″N 2°53′14″W	Category B	31609	Upload another image
2 East High Street				56°38′39″N 2°53′17″W	Category B	31484	Upload Photo
4-8 East High Street				56°38′39″N 2°53′16″W	Category C(S)	31485	Upload Photo
50 High Street 3, 5, 7, 9 Albion Place				56°38′39″N 2°53′10″W	Category C(S)	31491	Upload Photo
74-82 East High Street				56°38′40″N 2°53′06″W	Category B	31494	Upload Photo
Queen's Hotel 12, 14 Cross				56°38′38″N 2°53′19″W	Category C(S)	31500	Upload Photo
4-10 West High Street				56°38′39″N 2°53′23″W	Category C(S)	31501	Upload Photo
11, 13 West High Street And 27 Little Causeway				56°38′38″N 2°53′22″W	Category B	31508	Upload Photo
Lour - Steading And Stables				56°36′19″N 2°51′08″W	Category B	11371	Upload Photo
Inchgarth Farmhouse				56°38′48″N 2°54′48″W	Category B	11390	Upload Photo
37, 39 West High Street				56°38′36″N 2°53′26″W	Category C(S)	31515	Upload Photo
4 Little Causeway				56°38′37″N 2°53′22″W	Category B	31523	Upload Photo
19-21 Osnaburg Street				56°38′38″N 2°53′16″W	Category C(S)	31538	Upload Photo
23 Manor Street Manor Place, Including Fountain Garden Walls And Steps				56°38′43″N 2°53′30″W	Category B	31560	Upload Photo
Chapelpark Primary School (Former Academy) Academy Street, Western Block				56°38′39″N 2°53′04″W	Category B	31563	Upload another image
27-35 Dundee Loan				56°38′28″N 2°53′37″W	Category C(S)	31582	Upload Photo
18 Dundee Loan				56°38′29″N 2°53′38″W	Category C(S)	31585	Upload Photo
42-44 Dundee Loan				56°38′27″N 2°53′37″W	Category C(S)	31591	Upload Photo
11, 13 Eastern Sunnyside				56°38′26″N 2°53′32″W	Category C(S)	31601	Upload Photo
Lowson Memorial Parish Church Hall Jamieson Street				56°38′47″N 2°52′25″W	Category B	31605	Upload Photo
1-3 East High Street And 2 Castle Street				56°38′40″N 2°53′17″W	Category C(S)	31481	Upload Photo
St. John's Episcopal Church 71 East High Street				56°38′42″N 2°53′07″W	Category B	31483	Upload another image See more images
100, 102 East High Street				56°38′41″N 2°53′03″W	Category B	31495	Upload Photo
8-11 Cross				56°38′39″N 2°53′19″W	Category C(S)	31499	Upload Photo
12-16 West High Street				56°38′39″N 2°53′21″W	Category C(S)	31502	Upload Photo
Lour - Temple				56°36′17″N 2°51′41″W	Category B	13749	Upload Photo
Burnside Road Bridge Over Knowehead Burn				56°38′01″N 2°50′46″W	Category C(S)	11393	Upload Photo
Burnside Road Bridge Over Auchterforfar Burn				56°38′25″N 2°50′39″W	Category C(S)	11394	Upload Photo
South Street, Former Linen Works, Office Building With Italianate Tower				56°38′40″N 2°52′41″W	Category C(S)	51659	Upload Photo
23-27 West High Street				56°38′37″N 2°53′24″W	Category C(S)	31511	Upload Photo
7 (8) Little Causeway				56°38′36″N 2°53′23″W	Category B	31525	Upload Photo
11 Little Causeway				56°38′36″N 2°53′24″W	Category C(S)	31527	Upload Photo
2, 4 Osnaburg Street				56°38′39″N 2°53′17″W	Category C(S)	31540	Upload Photo
7, 9 Castle Street The County Hotel				56°38′40″N 2°53′21″W	Category B	31544	Upload Photo
13, 15 Castle Street				56°38′40″N 2°53′20″W	Category C(S)	31545	Upload Photo
3 Sparrowcroft				56°38′36″N 2°53′12″W	Category C(S)	31573	Upload Photo
4 Sparrowcroft				56°38′36″N 2°53′11″W	Category C(S)	31574	Upload Photo
14 Dundee Loan				56°38′29″N 2°53′38″W	Category C(S)	31584	Upload Photo
36 Dundee Loan				56°38′28″N 2°53′38″W	Category C(S)	31588	Upload Photo
58-62 Dundee Loan				56°38′26″N 2°53′37″W	Category C(S)	31592	Upload Photo
1 Eastern Sunnyside And 41 Dundee Loan				56°38′26″N 2°53′35″W	Category C(S)	31596	Upload Photo
9 Eastern Sunnyside				56°38′26″N 2°53′33″W	Category C(S)	31600	Upload Photo
15, 17 Eastern Sunnyside				56°38′26″N 2°53′32″W	Category C(S)	31602	Upload Photo
Monument To Sir Robert Peel, Newmont Hill				56°38′32″N 2°52′52″W	Category B	31607	Upload Photo
War Memorial, Balmashanner Hill				56°37′57″N 2°53′09″W	Category C(S)	31608	Upload another image See more images
50 High Street (County Assessor's)				56°38′40″N 2°53′10″W	Category B	31492	Upload Photo
British Linen Bank, Cross				56°38′39″N 2°53′17″W	Category B	31497	Upload Photo
Meffan Institute, 20 West High Street				56°38′39″N 2°53′22″W	Category C(S)	31503	Upload Photo
Lour - Sundial				56°36′17″N 2°51′07″W	Category B	11373	Upload Photo
Orchardbank House Including Boundary Walls And Pedestrian Gate				56°38′25″N 2°54′51″W	Category B	11391	Upload Photo
Craignathro Farm Cottages				56°37′30″N 2°52′50″W	Category C(S)	11395	Upload Photo
Reid Park Bar 39 West High Street And 19 Little Causeway				56°38′36″N 2°53′26″W	Category B	31516	Upload Photo
20 Little Causeway				56°38′36″N 2°53′25″W	Category C(S)	31530	Upload Photo
24 Little Causeway				56°38′37″N 2°53′24″W	Category C(S)	31534	Upload Photo
3-9 Osnaburg Street				56°38′39″N 2°53′17″W	Category C(S)	31535	Upload Photo
13-17 Osnaburg Street				56°38′38″N 2°53′16″W	Category C(S)	31537	Upload Photo
35-39 Castle Street				56°38′42″N 2°53′20″W	Category C(S)	31548	Upload Photo
Clydesdale Bank Buildings Castle Street				56°38′44″N 2°53′22″W	Category C(S)	31549	Upload Photo
75 Castle Street Eastern House Including Garden Walls				56°38′44″N 2°53′24″W	Category C(S)	31550	Upload Photo
28-36 Castle Street				56°38′42″N 2°53′18″W	Category B	31555	Upload Photo
10 Manor Street Old Parish Kirk Manse, Now Manor Guest House				56°38′45″N 2°53′24″W	Category C(S)	31558	Upload Photo
1 Sparrowcroft				56°38′36″N 2°53′13″W	Category C(S)	31571	Upload Photo
10 Dundee Loan				56°38′30″N 2°53′38″W	Category C(S)	31583	Upload Photo
38 Dundee Loan				56°38′27″N 2°53′38″W	Category C(S)	31589	Upload Photo
40 Dundee Loan				56°38′27″N 2°53′38″W	Category C(S)	31590	Upload Photo
5 Eastern Sunnyside				56°38′26″N 2°53′34″W	Category C(S)	31598	Upload Photo
Bankhead Farm And Cottage				56°39′02″N 2°53′43″W	Category B	31612	Upload Photo
Castle Street, 2 K6 Telephone Kiosks				56°38′41″N 2°53′19″W	Category B	31613	Upload Photo
Forfar Parish Churchyard East High Street				56°38′38″N 2°53′12″W	Category C(S)	31480	Upload Photo
16, 18 East High Street				56°38′39″N 2°53′15″W	Category C(S)	31488	Upload Photo
George Milne's 50 East High Street And 1 Albion Place				56°38′39″N 2°53′10″W	Category B	31490	Upload Photo
1-5 West High Street				56°38′38″N 2°53′21″W	Category C(S)	31506	Upload Photo
Balmashanner Farmhouse				56°37′44″N 2°52′47″W	Category B	13751	Upload Photo
Prior House				56°39′14″N 2°50′53″W	Category B	11387	Upload Photo
East Mains Farmhouse				56°36′23″N 2°49′28″W	Category C(S)	11396	Upload Photo
49, 51 West High Street				56°38′35″N 2°53′27″W	Category C(S)	31518	Upload Photo
53 West High Street				56°38′35″N 2°53′27″W	Category C(S)	31519	Upload Photo
9, 10 Little Causeway				56°38′36″N 2°53′23″W	Category C(S)	31526	Upload Photo
23 Little Causeway				56°38′37″N 2°53′24″W	Category C(S)	31533	Upload Photo
11 Osnaburg Street				56°38′39″N 2°53′16″W	Category C(S)	31536	Upload Photo
Municipal Buildings Castle Street				56°38′41″N 2°53′19″W	Category A	31542	Upload another image
1-5 Castle Street And 2 West High Street ('Pool's Corner')				56°38′39″N 2°53′20″W	Category B	31543	Upload Photo
17-21 Castle Street				56°38′40″N 2°53′20″W	Category C(S)	31546	Upload Photo
St. James's Road School (Old South School)				56°38′28″N 2°53′14″W	Category B	31567	Upload Photo
Farr Lodge, St. James's Road				56°38′35″N 2°53′11″W	Category C(S)	31570	Upload Photo
5 Sparrowcroft				56°38′36″N 2°53′11″W	Category C(S)	31575	Upload Photo
County Offices, Market Street (Original Section Only)				56°39′00″N 2°53′12″W	Category C(S)	31610	Upload another image
50 High Street, Southern Building On East Side Of Albion Place				56°38′40″N 2°53′10″W	Category B	31493	Upload Photo
7, 9 West High Street				56°38′38″N 2°53′21″W	Category C(S)	31507	Upload Photo
Auchterforfar Bridge Over Auchterforfar Burn				56°38′12″N 2°50′53″W	Category C(S)	11388	Upload Photo
45, 47 West High Street And Little Causeway				56°38′36″N 2°53′27″W	Category C(S)	31517	Upload Photo
14 (Formerly 17, 18) Little Causeway				56°38′36″N 2°53′25″W	Category C(S)	31528	Upload Photo
15 Little Causeway And 2 New Road				56°38′35″N 2°53′21″W	Category C(S)	31529	Upload Photo
23 Osnaburg Street, Osnaburg Bar With J.B. Dawes And Unionist Committee Rooms Building On Chapel Street				56°38′38″N 2°53′16″W	Category B	31539	Upload Photo
Congregational Chapel 6 Osnaburg Street				56°38′38″N 2°53′17″W	Category C(S)	31541	Upload another image
76 Castle Street Western House Including Garden Walls				56°38′44″N 2°53′25″W	Category B	31551	Upload Photo
24, 26 Castle Street				56°38′42″N 2°53′18″W	Category C(S)	31554	Upload Photo
Burgh Cross, Castlehill				56°38′40″N 2°53′18″W	Category B	31556	Upload Photo
13 Couttie's Wynd Including Garden Walls				56°38′39″N 2°53′06″W	Category B	31566	Upload Photo
St. James's Church Of Scotland. St. James's Road				56°38′37″N 2°53′05″W	Category B	31568	Upload another image
6 And Former 7 Sparrowcroft				56°38′36″N 2°53′10″W	Category C(S)	31576	Upload Photo
8 Sparrowcroft				56°38′36″N 2°53′09″W	Category C(S)	31577	Upload Photo
9 Sparrowcroft				56°38′36″N 2°53′08″W	Category C(S)	31578	Upload Photo
Wash House, Western Sunnyside				56°38′26″N 2°53′37″W	Category C(S)	31595	Upload Photo
Briar, Glamis Road				56°38′23″N 2°54′00″W	Category B	31603	Upload Photo
Forfar Parish Church East High Street				56°38′39″N 2°53′12″W	Category B	31479	Upload another image
10 East High Street With Close To 12				56°38′39″N 2°53′16″W	Category C(S)	31486	Upload Photo
20-26 East High Street				56°38′39″N 2°53′15″W	Category C(S)	31489	Upload Photo
Forfar Town and County Hall, Cross				56°38′40″N 2°53′19″W	Category B	31496	Upload another image
44-48 West High Street				56°38′38″N 2°53′25″W	Category C(S)	31505	Upload Photo
Restenneth Priory				56°39′12″N 2°50′46″W	Category A	11386	Upload Photo
"Boley Bridge" Over Greenmire Burn				56°36′27″N 2°48′57″W	Category B	11397	Upload Photo
95 Glamis Road, Langlands, Including Offices, Boundary Walls, Gatepiers And Gates				56°38′23″N 2°54′04″W	Category B	46515	Upload Photo
Ingleside (Old Secession Manse) East High Street				56°38′47″N 2°52′44″W	Category B	47326	Upload Photo
19-21 West High Street				56°38′37″N 2°53′24″W	Category C(S)	31510	Upload Photo
21 Little Causeway				56°38′37″N 2°53′25″W	Category C(S)	31531	Upload Photo
2, 4, 6 Manor Street				56°38′45″N 2°53′23″W	Category C(S)	31557	Upload Photo
7-11 Dundee Loan				56°38′29″N 2°53′37″W	Category C(S)	31580	Upload Photo
13-25 Dundee Loan				56°38′29″N 2°53′36″W	Category C(S)	31581	Upload Photo
7 Eastern Sunnyside				56°38′26″N 2°53′33″W	Category C(S)	31599	Upload Photo
17, 19 East High Street				56°38′40″N 2°53′15″W	Category B	31482	Upload Photo
Royal Bank Of Scotland, 6, 7 Cross				56°38′39″N 2°53′18″W	Category C(S)	31498	Upload Photo
15, 17 West High Street And 25, 26 Little Causeway				56°38′37″N 2°53′23″W	Category C(S)	31509	Upload Photo
Lour - Garden House				56°36′19″N 2°51′03″W	Category B	11372	Upload Photo
Railway Bridge Kas/200, By A926, At Turfbeg				56°39′13″N 2°54′29″W	Category B	45983	Upload Photo
3 New Road With Boundary Walls				56°38′35″N 2°53′24″W	Category C(S)	44181	Upload Photo
31, 33 West High Street				56°38′37″N 2°53′25″W	Category C(S)	31513	Upload Photo
1 Little Causeway				56°38′37″N 2°53′20″W	Category C(S)	31521	Upload Photo
22 Little Causeway				56°38′37″N 2°53′24″W	Category C(S)	31532	Upload Photo
Manor Street, Manor Works, East Block				56°38′41″N 2°53′34″W	Category B	31561	Upload Photo
19 Academy Street				56°38′38″N 2°53′03″W	Category C(S)	31564	Upload Photo
2, 4 St. James's Road				56°38′37″N 2°53′07″W	Category C(S)	31569	Upload Photo
28-34 Dundee Loan				56°38′28″N 2°53′38″W	Category C(S)	31587	Upload Photo
3 Eastern Sunnyside				56°38′26″N 2°53′35″W	Category C(S)	31597	Upload Photo
Lowson Memorial Parish Church, Manse, Jamieson Street And Lilybank Crescent				56°38′46″N 2°52′26″W	Category C(S)	31606	Upload Photo
Bankhead House				56°39′01″N 2°53′44″W	Category B	31611	Upload Photo
14 East High Street				56°38′39″N 2°53′16″W	Category C(S)	31487	Upload Photo
22-26 West High Street				56°38′38″N 2°53′23″W	Category C(S)	31504	Upload Photo
Lour - Doocot				56°36′18″N 2°51′16″W	Category B	11374	Upload Photo
Campbeltown Old Tollhouse				56°39′12″N 2°54′44″W	Category C(S)	11389	Upload Photo
Lour House Including Garden Walls				56°36′17″N 2°51′05″W	Category B	11398	Upload Photo
Wellbrae Primary School, Wellbraehead				56°38′49″N 2°53′04″W	Category C(S)	50236	Upload Photo

== Key ==
The scheme for classifying buildings in Scotland is:

- Category A: "buildings of national or international importance, either architectural or historic; or fine, little-altered examples of some particular period, style or building type."
- Category B: "buildings of regional or more than local importance; or major examples of some particular period, style or building type, which may have been altered."
- Category C: "buildings of local importance; lesser examples of any period, style, or building type, as originally constructed or moderately altered; and simple traditional buildings which group well with other listed buildings."

In March 2016 there were 47,288 listed buildings in Scotland. Of these, 8% were Category A, and 50% were Category B, with the remaining 42% being Category C.

== See also ==
- List of listed buildings in Angus
