= County Buildings, Forfar =

County building in Forfar, Scotland

County Buildings
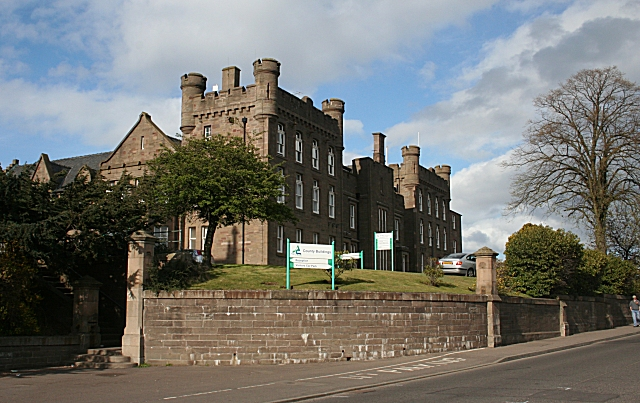
- County Buildings, Forfar

- Shown in Angus
- 56.6501°N 2.8864°W
- Location: Market Street, Forfar

History
- Built: 1843

Site notes
- Architect: David Smith
- Architectural style: Scottish baronial style

Listed Building – Category C(S)
- Official name: County Offices, Market Street (original section only)
- Designated: 15 January 1980
- Reference no.: LB31610

County Buildings is a municipal building in Market Street, Forfar, Scotland. The structure, which served as the headquarters of Angus County Council, is a Category C listed building.

== History ==
The original medieval prison facilities in the town were located in a tolbooth in The Cross. In 1788, the tolbooth was demolished and prisoners were transferred to cells behind the new Forfar Town and County Hall. After the prison inspectors criticised "the confined and bad state of Forfar Prison" in 1841, the prison commissioners decided to procure a new building on a site in Market Street in the north of the town.

The new prison building was designed by David Smith in the Scottish baronial style, built in ashlar stone and was completed in 1843. The design involved a symmetrical main frontage with thirteen bays facing onto Market Street; the end sections of four bays each, which slightly projected forward, were three storeys high and featured battlements at roof level and turrets at the corners. The central bay, which also slightly projected forward, was also three storeys high and featured a lancet window on the second floor and a twin-shaft chimney at roof level. The central bay was linked to the end sections by sections of just two storeys.

The sheriff court, which had been based in a building behind the town and county hall, moved to a new purpose built building to the west of the prison building in 1871. The prison building was converted into offices, to a design by John Carver, in 1883 and the gatehouse, which had formed part of the original construction, was demolished in 1884. Following the implementation of the Local Government (Scotland) Act 1889 which established a uniform system of county councils in Scotland, the new Forfarshire County Council established its headquarters in the former prison building which became known as County Buildings. It remained the headquarters of the county council after the authority was renamed Angus County Council in 1928.

The complex then became the headquarters for Angus District Council when it was created in May 1975 and, following the reorganisation under the Local Government etc. (Scotland) Act 1994, which saw the abolition of the district councils in the area, the building went on to become the offices of the new unitary authority, Angus Council, in 1996.

== See also ==
- List of listed buildings in Forfar, Angus
