= Loch Fithie =

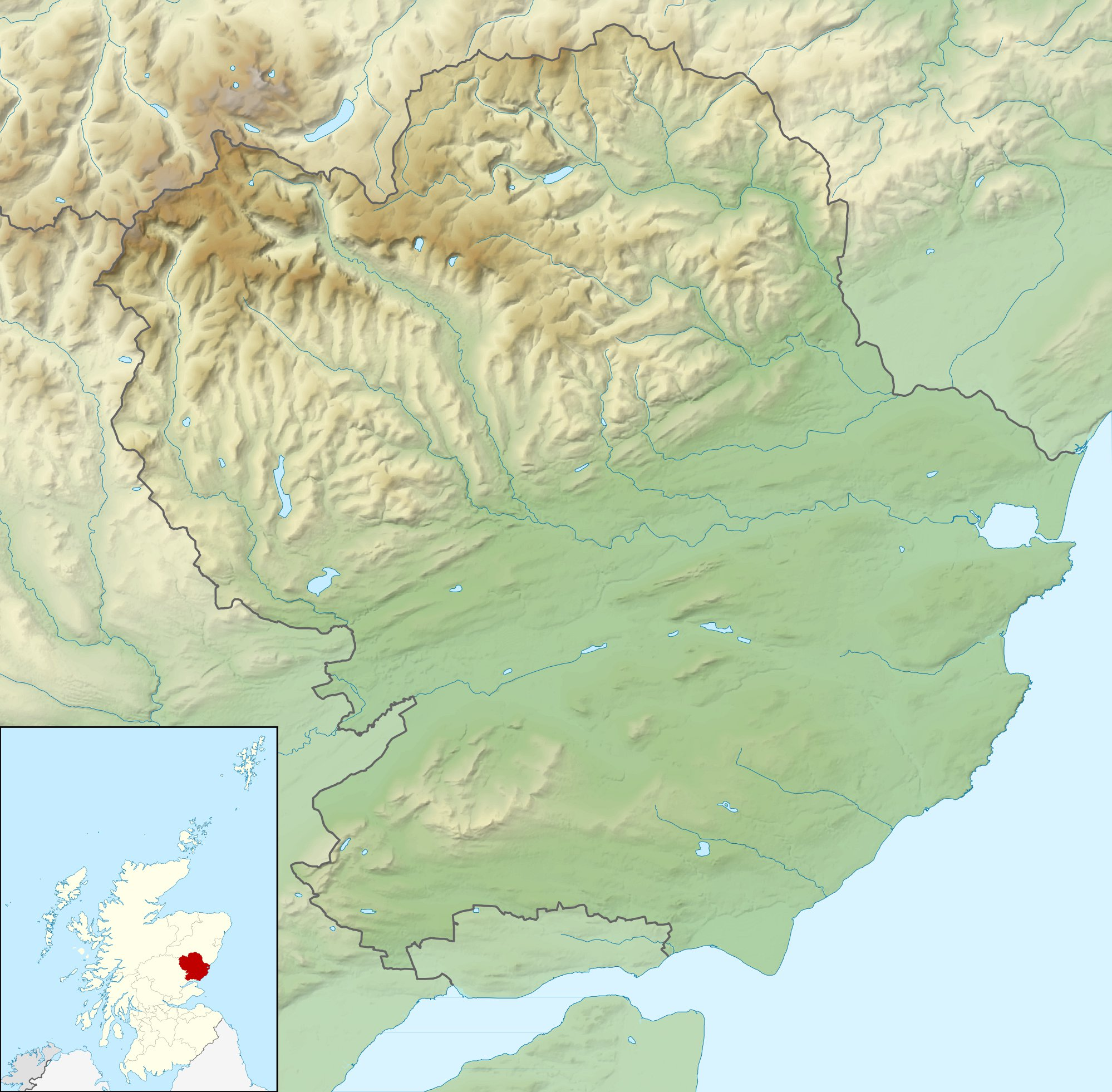
- Location within Angus
- Location: Angus, Scotland
- Coordinates: 56°39′4″N 2°50′1″W
- Type: freshwater loch
- Primary inflows: on the eastern shore
- Primary outflows: no outflow
- Basin countries: Scotland
- Max. length: 1.6 km (1 mi)
- Max. width: 140 m (150 yd)
- Surface area: 7.1 ha (18 acres)
- Average depth: 2.3 m (7.5 ft)
- Max. depth: 4.9 m (16 ft)
- Water volume: 200,000 m^{3} (7,000,000 ft^{3})
- Shore length^{1}: 1.4 km (0.87 mi)
- Surface elevation: 67 m (220 ft)
- Islands: 0
- ^{1} Shore length is not a well-defined measure.

Loch Fithie is a small, lowland freshwater loch lying approximately 2 miles (3.2 km) east of Forfar, Scotland. It is approximately 800 m (2,600 ft) in length.

== Survey ==
The loch was surveyed on 30 June 1903 by Sir John Murray and later charted as part of Murray's Bathymetrical Survey of Fresh-Water Lochs of Scotland 1897-1909.

== History ==
To the northwest of the loch are the remains of the Augustinian Restenneth Priory. In 1954, a stone axe head was found during excavations of a gravel ridge at the loch.
