= Isobell Shyrie =

Scottish woman executed for witchcraft c.1662

Isobell Shyrie (died c. 1662) was a woman accused during the Forfar witch trials of and executed for witchcraft in Forfar, Scotland.

== Biography ==
Shyrie was the first of 12 women arrested and imprisoned at the Forfar Tolboth following accusations of witchcraft in 1661. Shyrie's arrest followed an accusation that she had cursed an official, George Wood, which started the event now known as the 'Forfar Witch Trials'.

Judicial execution of Shyrie was carried out in December 1662, during the hysteria of the Great Scottish Witch Hunt of 1661–62. The Forfar witch trials ended with the execution of Helen Guthrie, who was the last woman to be executed for witchcraft in the town.

Helen Guthrie, in her confession, is said to have described an event on about 18 July 1661 when she, Shyrie, and Elspet Alexander travelled to Barry and, after drinking three pints of ale, went to the shore to meet the devil, who took the appearance of a great horse. The purpose of the meeting was to sink a ship which was off the coast. The women met the devil again later, and he kissed them all. The devil, at a later meeting, rode Shyrie like a horse and gave her the nickname "Horse": it was noted that her hands were sore the next morning after this episode. Agnes Spark, another suspect, also referred to Shyrie in her testimony, saying that Shyrie "did cairie hir away".

== Commemoration ==
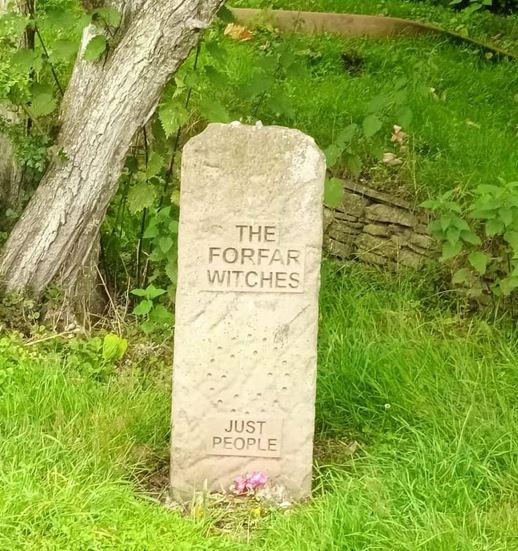
Forfar Witches Memorial

In 2010, a memorial was placed to commemorate 22 suspected witches who were executed in Forfar, including Shyrie. The memorial which is dedicated to 'Forfar Witches' contains 22 dots, each representing one of the woman who were executed.

A service was held in East and Old Church, Forfar, in 2022, to recognise the injustice done to supposed witches in the past, during which the names of the 22 Forfar people accused of witchcraft, including Shyrie, were read out.

== See also ==
- Witch trails in early modern Scotland
