= Forfar Golf Club =

Scottish golf club

Coordinates: 56.6449°N 2.8519°W

Club information
- Established: 1871
- Total holes: 18
- Website: forfargolfclub.com

Forfar Golf Club is a golf club located at Cunninghill, on the outskirts of Forfar, Angus, Scotland. Founded in 1871, it is recognised as the first golf club in the world to have opened with an 18-hole course from inception. The original layout was designed by four-time Open champion Old Tom Morris and subsequently revised in 1926 by five-time Open champion James Braid. The course plays to a par of 69 over 6,170 yards of heathland terrain.

== History ==
Forfar Golf Club was established in 1871 when James Brodie, a graduate of St Andrews University who had recently become rector of Forfar Academy, persuaded Colonel Dempster of Dunnichen to permit golf over fifty acres of ground at Cunninghill. Old Tom Morris of St Andrews was engaged to lay out the course. Brodie served as club secretary from 1871 until his death in 1899.

Early members used a room at Lochhead Farm as a clubhouse. In 1889, further land was acquired and a permanent clubhouse constructed. Ladies were admitted to the club in 1895, and in 1920 the membership purchased the course outright for £700.

In 1926, James Braid was engaged to revise the layout. His principal alteration was the elimination of holes that had previously crossed one another. The letter containing Braid's recommendations is preserved in the clubhouse. The course has remained substantially unchanged since.

In 2022, the club held delayed celebrations marking its 150th anniversary, which included a visit from the Earl of Forfar.

== Course ==
The course occupies an eighty-acre wooded estate and is classified as heathland. The fairways feature pronounced undulating ridges, attributed to the land's previous use for cultivating and drying flax in rows, a practice that created the characteristic rig and furrow pattern across the ground. The layout places a premium on accuracy rather than length, with ten of the thirteen par fours measuring under 400 yards. Each fairway runs in isolation through avenues of Scots pine.

The signature hole is the 15th, known as 'Braid's Best'. A par four of 412 yards, it features a rightward dogleg with a raised green protected by three bunkers and a steep slope to the left.

== Notable members ==
Sandy Saddler was club champion at Forfar seven times before representing Scotland 22 times and Great Britain 14 times in international competition between 1959 and 1967. He appeared in three Walker Cup matches and served as non-playing captain of the GB&I Walker Cup team in 1977.

Stuart Wilson began playing as a junior at Forfar and went on to win the 2004 Amateur Championship at St Andrews, defeating Francesco Molinari en route to the final. He subsequently won the Silver Medal as the leading amateur at the 2004 Open Championship at Royal Troon, having opened with a 68 to sit two shots off the lead. Wilson also competed in the 2005 Masters Tournament at Augusta National. He played on the winning GB&I team at the 2003 Walker Cup at Ganton, and captained GB&I at the 2021 Walker Cup and 2023 Walker Cup.

== Championship history ==
Forfar has hosted several national events:

Events hosted at Forfar Golf Club
Tournament	Year
Scottish PGA Championship	1932, 1966
Scottish Boys Championship	1976, 1980
Girls Home Internationals	1997
Scottish Boys Under-16s Championship	2011
