= Loch of Forfar =

Lake in Scotland

- Forfar loch
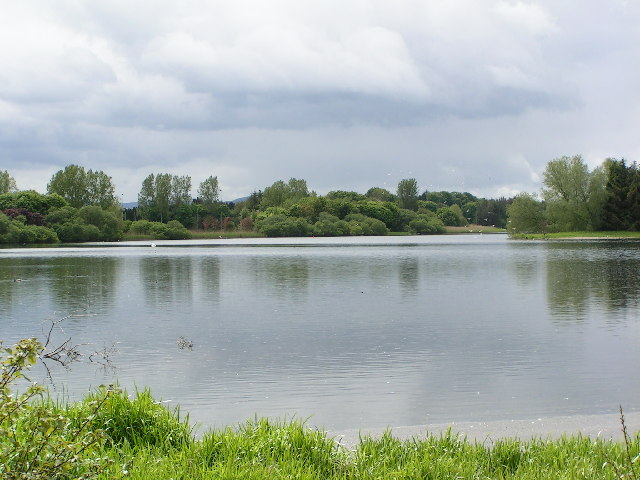
- Loch of Forfar

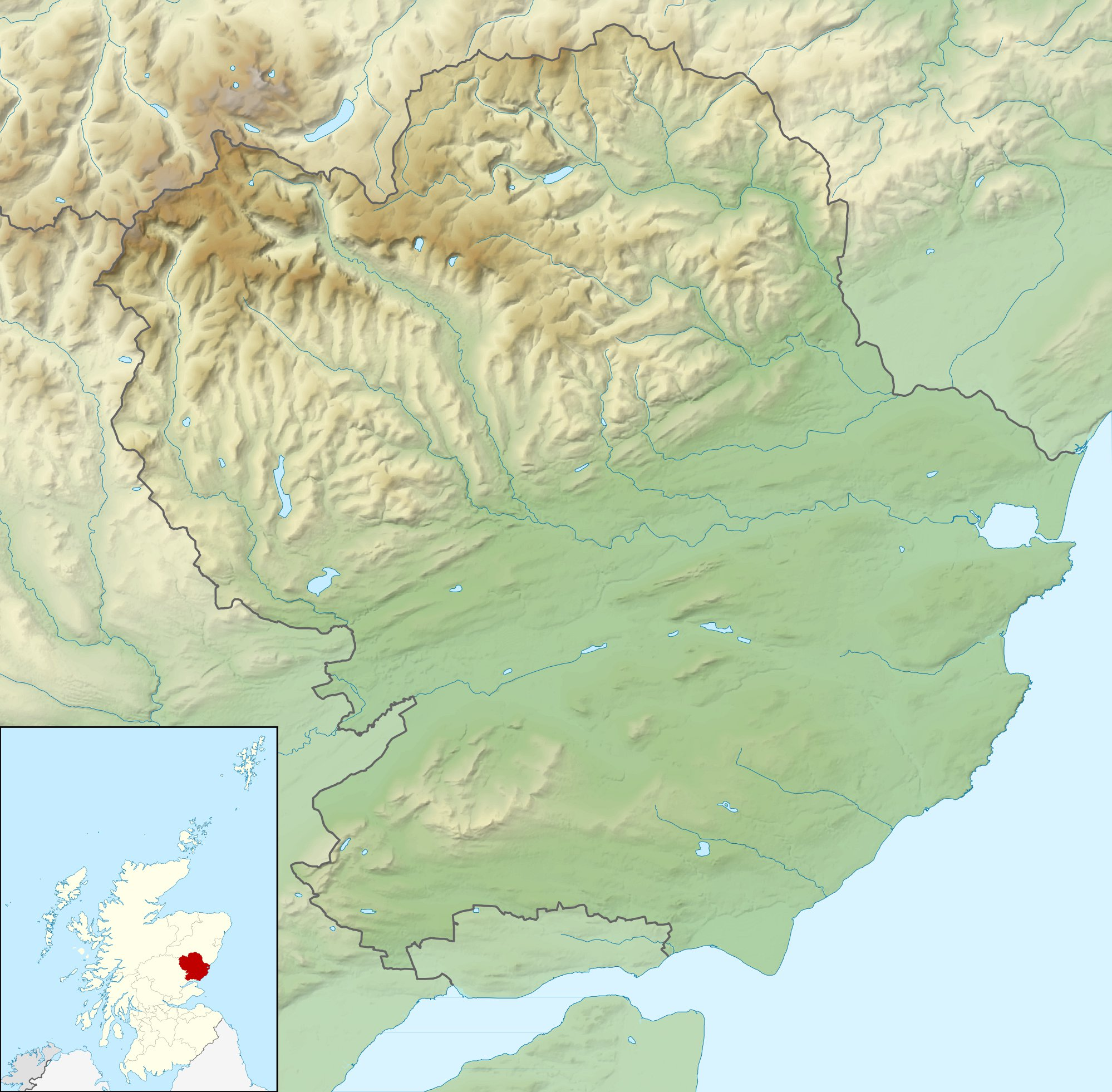
- Location within Angus
- Location: Forfar, Angus, Scotland
- Coordinates: 56°38′36″N 2°54′44″W
- Type: freshwater loch
- Primary outflows: Dean Water
- Basin countries: Scotland
- Max. length: 1 mi (1.6 km)
- Max. width: 0.14 mi (0.23 km)
- Surface area: 37.7 ha (93 acres)
- Average depth: 11.5 ft (3.5 m)
- Max. depth: 29 ft (8.8 m)
- Water volume: 51,232,000 ft^{3} (1,450,700 m^{3})
- Shore length^{1}: 4.3 km (2.7 mi)
- Surface elevation: 57 m (187 ft)
- Islands: 1
- ^{1} Shore length is not a well-defined measure.

Loch of Forfar is a freshwater loch lying on the western side of the town of Forfar, Scotland. The loch trends in an east to west direction and is approximately 1 mi (1.6 km) in length. The loch and area around it form Forfar Loch Country Park.

On the northern side of the loch there is a natural gravel projection which is named Queen Margaret's Inch or Saint Margaret's Inch. The projection was named after Queen Margaret, the 11th century Queen of Scots. Several historical structures have been located on the Inch including a crannog and a chapel.

== History ==
A crannog named Queen Margaret's Inch once stood on the loch. It was exposed when the loch was drained in 1781. Several items were then retrieved including silver earrings, bone chess pieces and bronze objects. It is thought that around 1243 a cell of monks from Coupar Angus Abbey inhabited the Inch and that The Chapel of the Holy Trinity and several houses were built.

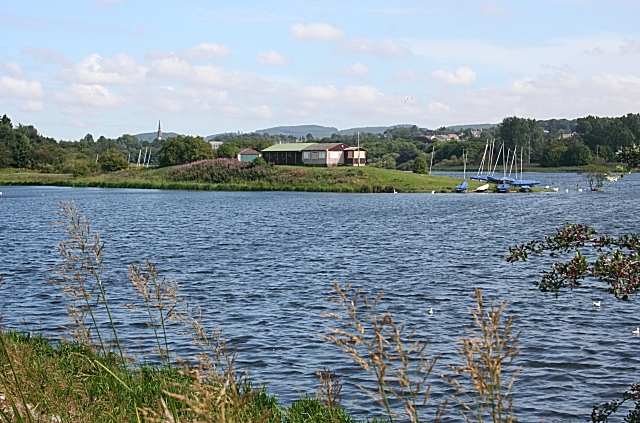
St Margaret's Inch at Loch of Forfar

== Recreation and leisure ==
The loch is a local centre for recreation and leisure activities including walking, sailing, canoeing, orienteering and fishing. The Forfar Loch Country Park Ranger Service provide a range of environmental activities and talks. The Forfar Sailing Club has its facilities on the Inch.

There are several paths and trails in and around the loch all of which are marked and fully wheelchair accessible.

== Survey ==
The loch was surveyed on 26 June 1903 by Sir John Murray and later charted as part of Murray's Bathymetrical Survey of Fresh-Water Lochs of Scotland 1897-1909.
