= Forfar Sheriff Court =

Judicial building in Forfar, Scotland

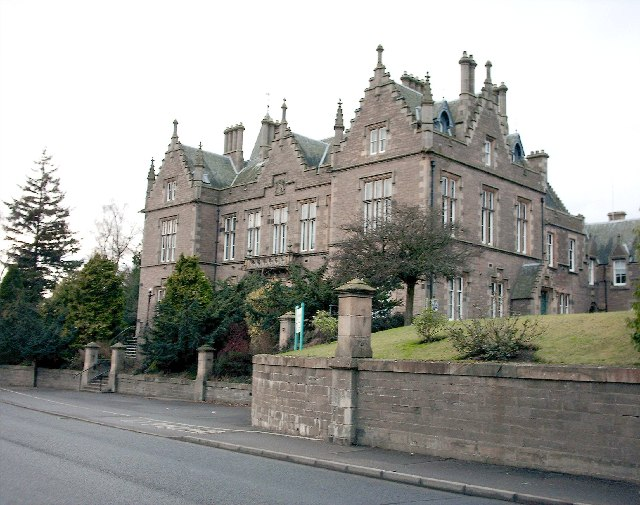
- Forfar Sheriff Court

- Shown in Angus
- 56.6499°N 2.8873°W
- Location: Market Street, Forfar

History
- Built: 1871

Site notes
- Architect: James Maitland Wardrop
- Architectural style: Scottish baronial style

Listed Building – Category B
- Official name: Forfar Sheriff Court House including steps, boundary walls and piers, Market Street and Brechin Road, Forfar
- Designated: 11 June 1971
- Reference no.: LB31609

Forfar Sheriff Court is a judicial building in Market Street, Forfar, Angus, Scotland. The building, which remains in use as a courthouse, is a Category B listed building.

== History ==
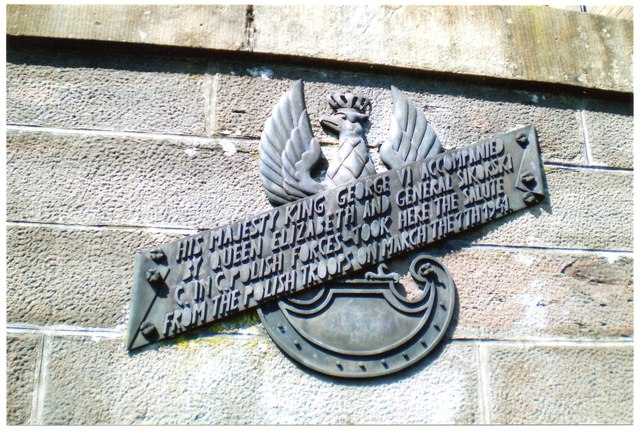
Plaque to commemorate the march past by Polish I Corps on 7 March 1941

The first judicial building in the town was a medieval tolbooth in The Cross which was primarily used to the detention of prisoners and which dated back at least to the 16th century. This was replaced by the Town and County Hall which was built on the same site in 1788, and was supplemented by a dedicated courthouse erected behind the Town and County Hall in 1824. However, by the mid-19th century the old courthouse was considered inadequate and, following the implementation of the Sheriff Court Houses (Scotland) Act 1860, which laid down minimum standards for courthouses, the Commissioners of Supply decided to commission a new courthouse on a site to the immediate west of Forfar Prison in Market Street.

The foundation stone for the new building was laid by Fox Maule-Ramsay, 11th Earl of Dalhousie on 5 August 1869. It was designed by James Maitland Wardrop of the firm of Brown & Wardrop in the Scottish baronial style, built in ashlar stone and was officially opened on by the Sheriff-Substitute, Andrew Robertson, on 2 February 1871.

The design involved a symmetrical main frontage of seven bays facing onto Market Street with the end bays projected forward; the central section of five bays featured a portico formed by an arched opening with an architrave flanked by pilasters supporting a balustraded parapet surmounted by finials. There were tri-partite windows on either side of the portico, five bi-partite windows on the first floor and a panel containing the Royal coat of arms just below the stepped gable above. The outer bays were fenestrated by tri-partite windows on the ground floor and the first floor and by bi-partite windows in the stepped gables above. Smaller panels above the ground floor windows recalled the towns over which the courthouse had jurisdiction viz. "A" for Arbroath, "D" for Dundee, "B" for Brechin and "M" for Montrose. The gables were augmented by gargoyles and pinnacles. A rectangular wing to accommodate the local police force was erected to the northeast of the main structure. Internally, the principal room was a large courtroom on the first floor of the main structure.

A plaque was placed on the front of the courthouse to commemorate the march past of elements of Polish I Corps, in front of King George VI, accompanied by Queen Elizabeth and General Władysław Sikorski, on 7 March 1941. The courthouse continued to serve a judicial function, being used for hearings of the sheriff's court and, on one day a month, for hearings of the justice of the peace court into the 21st century.

== See also ==
- List of listed buildings in Forfar, Angus
