= Forfar Witch Trials =

Witch Trials in Forfar, Angus, Scotland

The Forfar Witch Trials took place in Forfar in the 16th and 17th century during the Scottish Witch-Hunt, coming to an end in a final intense witch hunt in 1661/1662. The last person accused of witchcraft to be executed was Helen Guthrie, who died in December 1662.

== Early Witch Hunts ==
The first witch hunts in Forfar by the Scottish Witchcraft Act took place under regent Moray, in which thirty-eight people were accused judicially in Forfar in 1568. Between 1649 and 1650, there were 16 people suspected of witchcraft in the county of Forfar.

== Trials of 1661/1662 ==
The final witch hunt took place between 1661 and 1662, in which at least 53 people were accused of being witches. In the years prior, Scotland had suffered from failed crops, sickness, invasion by the troops of Cromwell, leading to unrest and an intensified religious atmosphere dominated by the Presbyterian Church of Scotland. At the time, Forfar was a town with a population of approximately 1000 people, with a surrounding additional population of probably up to 2000: the number of accused therefore constituted a significant percentage, above the national average. The majority of the accused were Catholic, women and living on the margins of society.

The town paid the infamous witch-pricker John Kincaid to come and interrogate the suspected witches. The first victim of the witch hunt was a young woman called Girzell Simpson, who was buried and not burned, as was standard practise for those considered guilty of witchcraft. Two sisters, Margaret and Elizabeth Guthrie, were freed by their brother James, a lawyer from Dundee, and sent home under house arrest.

The last person to be executed as with was Helen Guthrie, who may have implicated several other women in the confessions she gave. Among other things, Helen Guthrie said that she and her companions decided to sink a ship with the help of the devil. She further alleged that Elspet Bruice, Mary Rynd and several other witches had flown to the coronation of king Charles II on 23 April 1661. Helen Guthrie was then executed with at least five other women in Forfar’s Playfield, known today as Victoria Street. Her daughter Janet was held for another four years in the local tollbooth and released in January 1666.

The documents of the victims confessions obtained in the trials can be seen in the Angus Archives.

== Memorial ==
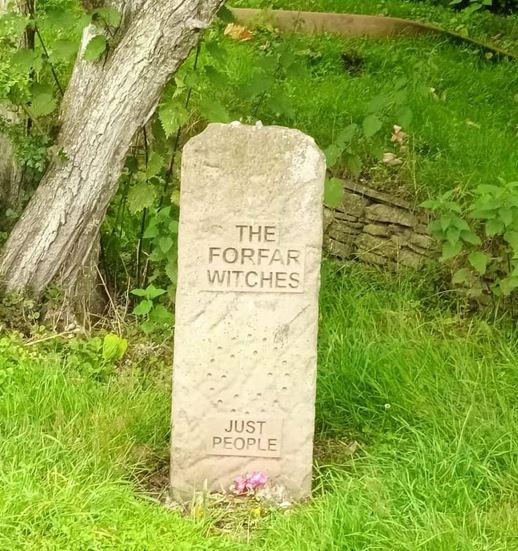
Forfar Witches Memorial, erected in 2022

In 2022, the advocacy campaign Witches of Scotland achieved that Nicola Sturgeon, then first minister of Scotland, issued a formal apology to the Scots that were persecuted under the Scottish Witchcraft Act. Additionally, some female ministers of the Church of Scotland also issued an apology. A memorial service took place in October 2022 at East and Old Parish Church, nearly 360 years after the last woman was executed in Forfar and a memorial stone was erected close to Forfar loch.

== Known Victims ==
- Girzell Simpson, executed in August 1661
- Helen Guthrie, executed in December 1662
- Isobell Shyrie, executed in December 1662

== Bibliography ==
=== Published primary sources ===
- Anderson, Joseph (1887–1888). "The Confessions of the Forfar Witches (1661), from the Original Documents in the Society's Library". Proceedings of the Society of Antiquaries of Scotland. 22: 241–262. doi:10.9750/PSAS.022.241.262.

=== Secondary sources ===
- Baker, Lindsay (16 May 2025). "'People are still haunted by what happened': How history's brutal witch trials still resonate now". www.bbc.com. BBC.
- Bletcher, Graeme (6 April 2013). "Mystery over Forfar witch trials still brewing". The Courier. DC Thomson Co Ltd.
- Goodare, J. (31 October 2013). Scottish Witches and Witch-Hunters. Springer. ISBN 978-1-137-35594-2.
- Larner, Christina (1981). Enemies of God: The Witch-hunt in Scotland. Baltimore, Maryland: The Johns Hopkins University Press. ISBN 0801826993.
- Mitchell, Claire; Venditozzi, Zoe (2025). How to Kill a Witch. Hatchett. ISBN 9781800961883.
- MacPherson, Hamish (16 July 2024). "The story of a Scottish town made infamous for its 'witch' trials". The National.
- Scharlau, Fiona C. (1995). The Story of the Forfar Witches. Angus District Council, Libraries and Museums Service. ISBN 978-1-873752-10-4.
- Strachan, Graeme (26 October 2022). "Forfar Witch Trials: Suffering of executed women to be recognised in 'historic' service". The Courier. DC Thomson Co Ltd.
