= Willie Brown (footballer, born 1928) =

Scottish footballer (1928–2017)

Personal information
- Full name: William Brown
- Date of birth: 17 September 1928
- Place of birth: Forfar, Scotland
- Date of death: January 2017 (aged 88)
- Place of death: Forfar, Scotland
- Position: Centre forward

Senior career*
| Years | Team | Apps | (Gls) |
| 1951–1953 | Forfar Athletic | 42 | (25) |
| 1953–1954 | Accrington Stanley | 6 | (2) |
- Nelson
| Total | | 48 | (27) |
- * Club domestic league appearances and goals

William Brown (17 September 1928 – January 2017) was a Scottish professional footballer who played as a centre forward in the Scottish League and in the English Football League. He was born and died in Forfar.

== Sources ==
- Hugman, Barry (2005). The PFA Premier and Football League Players' Records 1946-2005. Queen Anne Press.
