= Forfar Town and County Hall =

Municipal building in Forfar, Scotland

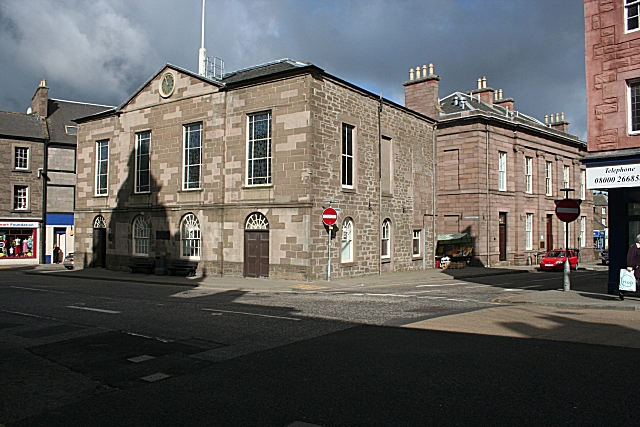
- Forfar Town and County Hall

- Shown in Angus
- 56.6444°N 2.8885°W
- Location: The Cross, Forfar

History
- Built: 1788

Site notes
- Architect: James Playfair
- Architectural style: Neoclassical style

Listed Building – Category B
- Official name: Forfar Town and County Hall, Cross
- Designated: 11 June 1971
- Reference no.: LB31496

Forfar Town and County Hall is a municipal building in The Cross, Forfar, Scotland. The structure, which serves as the meeting place of the Angus Council, is a Category B listed building.

== History ==
=== Early history ===
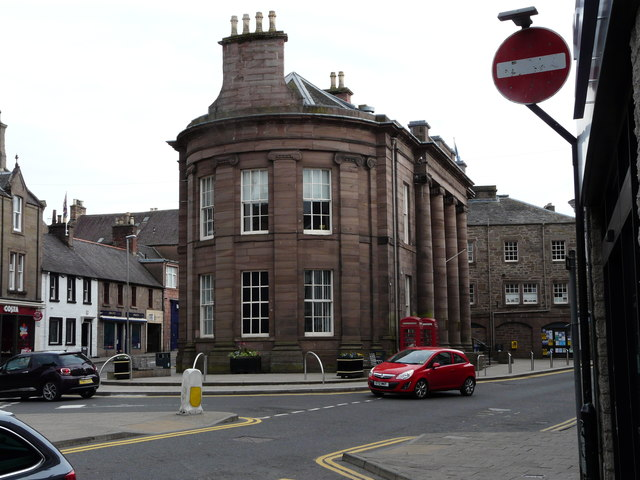
The municipal buildings, completed in 1824, behind the town and county hall

The first municipal building in the town was a medieval tolbooth which was primarily used for the detention of prisoners and which dated back at least to the 16th century. In the early 1660s, 42 women were tried for witchcraft at the tolbooth and, in some cases, found guilty and executed by strangulation. In the late 1770s the burgh officials decided to demolish the dilapidated tolbooth and to erect a new building in its place.

The new building was designed by James Playfair in the neoclassical style, built in ashlar stone at a cost of £1,100 and was completed in 1788. The design involved a symmetrical main frontage with four bays facing onto The Cross; the central section of two bays, which slightly projected forward, featured round-headed windows on the ground floor, square-headed windows on the first floor and a pediment above. The outer bays contained doorways on the ground floor and square-headed windows on the first floor.

At roof level, there was originally a bellcote. The building was originally intended to operate as a weigh house and butter market. Internally, the principal rooms, which were all accessed by passing through the left-hand doorway and then up a staircase, were at the front of the building: they were the council chamber on the left, the county hall in the centre and the sheriff's courtroom on the right. The county hall contained several crystal chandeliers which were presented by the future local member of parliament, David Scott.

In the late 18th century, criminals were held in cells behind the town and county hall; they were taken to the courtroom and, if they were found guilty and sentenced to be hanged, the sentence was carried out from the first-floor window on the east side of the building. The bellcote was removed and the pediment was enhanced by the installation of a clock in the tympanum in 1804. A dedicated sheriff's courthouse, designed by David Neave with a large tetrastyle portico, was erected to the immediate north of the town and county hall at a cost of £5,000 and was completed in 1824. Internal alterations to the town and county hall, to a design by William Scott, were completed in 1847: the changes involved the removal of the old council chamber and the old sheriff courtroom and the enlargement of the county hall.

The sheriff court moved to a new purpose-built building adjacent to the county prison in Market Street in the north of the town in 1871. Then, in 1883, the county prison in Market Street was converted into offices and, following the implementation of the Local Government (Scotland) Act 1889 which established a uniform system of county councils in Scotland, the new Forfarshire County Council established its headquarters in the Market Street building which later became known as the County Buildings.

=== 20th century and thereafter ===
In the 20th century, the town and county hall served as a venue for public events, particularly functions organised by the county council, while the former sheriff courthouse behind was re-designated the "municipal buildings": burgh council officers and their departments, including the town clerk's department, were accommodated within the latter building. A plaque to commemorate the residence of the 10th Polish Reconnaissance Group in the town from October 1940 to April 1942 was placed on the western elevation of the town and county hall on the unit's departure during the Second World War.

At a ceremony attended by the General Officer Commanding-in-Chief Scottish Command, Lieutenant-General Sir Colin Barber, in September 1952, a plaque was unveiled on the front of the town and county hall and four stained glass windows were unveiled inside the building to commemorate the lives of local service personnel who had died in the First and Second World Wars. Queen Elizabeth The Queen Mother visited the town and county hall to receive the freedom of the town in 1956.

The municipal buildings ceased to be the local seat of government when the enlarged Angus District Council established its offices at County Buildings in Market Street in 1975. However, the town and county hall continued to be used as a civic meeting place and continued in that role when the new unitary authority, Angus Council, was formed in 1996. It also continued to be used by the Lord Lieutenant of Angus for investitures. Queen Elizabeth II, accompanied by the Duke of Edinburgh, visited the town and county hall and had lunch with civic officials in July 2004.

Works of art in the town and county hall include a portrait by John Hoppner of Admiral Viscount Duncan who lived at Lundie, a portrait by George Romney of the politician, David Scott, and a portrait by Sir Henry Raeburn of Viscount Melville.

== See also ==
- List of listed buildings in Forfar, Angus
