= Helen Guthrie (accused witch) =

Last woman executed for witchcraft in Forfar, Scotland (d. 1662

- Died: c. December 1662; Forfar, Scotland
- Cause of death: Executed for witchcraft
- Known for: The last woman suspected of being a witch to be executed in Forfar

Helen Guthrie (died c. December 1662) was the last woman suspected of being a witch to be executed during the Forfar witch trials in Forfar, Scotland.

== Biography ==
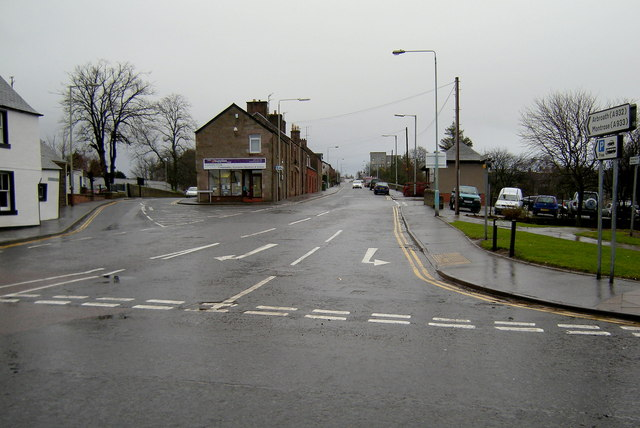
Victoria Street, Forfar. Former location of the Playfield where Guthrie was executed.

In December 1662, Guthrie, along with her thirteen year old daughter Janet and 11 other women Including Isobell Shyrie, were accused of witchcraft and held at the Forfar tolbooth. Guthrie was subsequently strangled and burned with tar before being sentenced and judicially executed at the Playfield Forfar (situated on the site of the present day Victoria Street). Janet was released from custody in 1666 after the hysteria of the Great Scottish Witch Hunt of 1661–62 subsided.

== Forfar Witches Memorial ==
In 2010, a memorial was placed to commemorate 22 suspected witches who were executed in Forfar, including Guthrie. The memorial which is dedicated to 'Forfar Witches' contains 22 dots, one for each of the women who were executed.

A further memorial to all 50 local witches so far identified, is placed in the Town Hall which is built on the site of the Tollbooth where the majority of the executions took place.

== Meffan Institute ==
The Meffan Institute museum in Forfar contains a walk through and exhibition of historic scenes from the town's history, including the execution of Guthrie.

== See also ==
- Witch trials in early modern Scotland
