= John Ker (moderator) =

Scottish minister

John Ker (c.1715–1781) was a Scottish minister who served as Moderator of the General Assembly of the Church of Scotland in 1776.

== Life ==
He was born in the manse in Roxburghshire around 1715. He studied divinity at the University of Edinburgh and was licensed by the Presbytery of Kelso in November 1739.

He was ordained as minister of Kettins in February 1744. In March 1745 he translated to Forfar Parish Church covering the parishes of Forfar and Restenneth. He was minister there for 36 years. In 1761 King's College, Aberdeen awarded him an honorary Doctor of Divinity. The University made him a Doctor of Medicine in the same year.

In 1776 he succeeded the David Shaw as Moderator of the General Assembly of the Church of Scotland the highest position in the Scottish Church. He was succeeded in turn by James Brown.

He died at Forfar manse on 15 December 1781.

== Family ==
In 1746 he married Agnes Burton.
