= Angus, Scotland =

Council area of Scotland

Angus Aonghas (Scottish Gaelic)
- Lieutenancy and council area
- Coat of arms

- Angus shown within Scotland
- Coordinates: 56°40′N 2°55′W
- Sovereign state: United Kingdom
- Country: Scotland
- Unitary authority: 1 April 1996
- Administrative HQ: Forfar Town and County Hall

Government
  - Type: Council
  - Body: Angus Council
  - Control: No overall control
  - MPs: 2 MPs: Dave Doogan (SNP); Lara Bird (SNP)
  - MSPs: 2 MSPs: Dawn Black (SNP); Lloyd Melville (SNP)

Area
  - Total: 842 sq mi (2,181 km^{2})
  - Rank: 10th

Population (2024)
  - Total: 114,810
  - Rank: 19th
  - Density: 140/sq mi (53/km^{2})
- Time zone: UTC+0 (GMT)
  - Summer (DST): UTC+1 (BST)
- ISO 3166 code: GB-ANS
- GSS code: S12000041
- Website: angus.gov.uk

Angus (Scots: Angus; Scottish Gaelic: Aonghas) is one of the 32 local government council areas of Scotland, and a lieutenancy area. The council area borders Aberdeenshire, Dundee City and Perth and Kinross. Main industries include agriculture and fishing. Global pharmaceuticals company GSK has a significant presence in Montrose in the east of the county.

Angus was historically a province, and later a sheriffdom and county (called Forfarshire or the County of Forfar until 1928), bordering Kincardineshire to the north-east, Aberdeenshire to the north and Perthshire to the west; southwards it faced Fife across the Firth of Tay. The county included Dundee until 1894, when it was made a county of a city. The pre-1894 boundaries of Angus continue to be used as a registration county. Between 1975 and 1996 Angus was a lower-tier district within the Tayside region. The district took on its modern form and powers in 1996, since when the local authority has been Angus Council.

== History ==
=== Etymology ===
The name "Angus" indicates the territory of the eighth-century Pictish king, Óengus I.

=== Prehistory ===
The area that now comprises Angus has been occupied since at least the Neolithic period. Material taken from postholes from an enclosure at Douglasmuir, near Friockheim, about 5 mi (8 km) north of Arbroath has been radiocarbon dated to around 3500 BC. The function of the enclosure is unknown, but may have been for agriculture or for ceremonial purposes.

Bronze Age archaeology is to be found in abundance in the area. Examples include the short-cist burials found near West Newbigging, about a mile to the North of the town. These burials included pottery urns, a pair of silver discs and a gold armlet. Iron Age archaeology is also well represented, for example in the souterrain nearby Warddykes cemetery and at West Grange of Conan, as well as the better-known examples at Carlungie and Ardestie.

=== Medieval and later history ===
The county is traditionally associated with the Pictish territory of Circin, which is thought to have encompassed Angus and the Mearns. Bordering it were the kingdoms of Cé (Mar and Buchan) to the North, Fotla (Atholl) to the West, and Fib (Fife) to the South. The most visible remnants of the Pictish age are the numerous sculptured stones that can be found throughout Angus. Of particular note are the collections found at Aberlemno, St Vigeans, Kirriemuir and Monifieth.

Angus is first recorded as one of the provinces of Scotland in 937, when Dubacan, the Mormaer of Angus, is recorded in the Chronicle of the Kings of Alba as having died at the Battle of Brunanburh.

The signing of the Declaration of Arbroath at Arbroath Abbey in 1320 marked Scotland's establishment as an independent nation. Partly on this basis, Angus is marketed as the birthplace of Scotland. It is an area of rich history from Pictish times onwards. Notable historic sites in addition to Arbroath Abbey include Glamis Castle, Arbroath Signal Tower museum and the Bell Rock Lighthouse, described as one of the Seven Wonders of the Industrial World.

During the 16th and 17th century, several witch trials took place in Forfar, the last of which took place in 1662 and in which 52 people were accused. At the time, Forfar was a town of around 1,000 inhabitants, with an additional 2,000 people residing in the county.

=== Administrative history ===
Angus was one of the ancient provinces of Scotland, under the authority of the Mormaer or Earl of Angus. From at least the thirteenth century the area formed the basis for a shire (the area administered by a sheriff) based in Forfar: the Sheriff of Forfar.

Over time, Scotland's shires became more significant than the old provinces, with more administrative functions being given to the sheriffs. The older territory called Angus was therefore gradually eclipsed in legal importance by the shire of Forfar (or Forfarshire) which covered the same area. In 1667 Commissioners of Supply were established for each shire, which would serve as the main administrative body for the area until the creation of county councils in 1890. Following the Acts of Union in 1707, the English term 'county' came to be used interchangeably with the older term 'shire'.

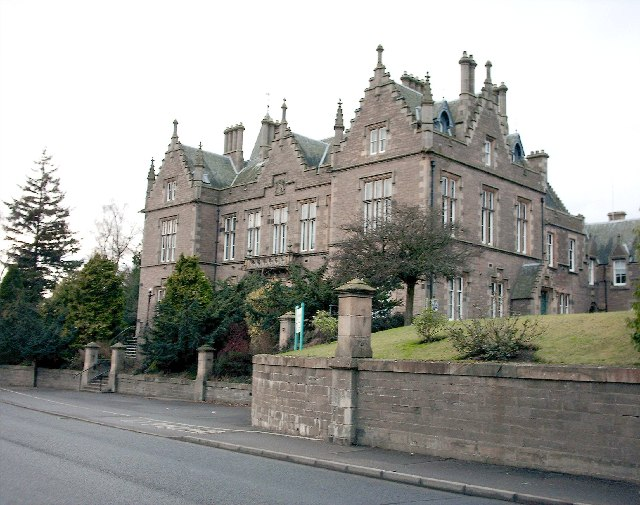
Forfar Sheriff Court, built 1871 as the county's main courthouse, also served as the first meeting place of the county council in 1890

Elected county councils were established in 1890 under the Local Government (Scotland) Act 1889, taking most of the functions of the commissioners (which were eventually abolished in 1930). The county's five largest burghs, being Arbroath, Brechin, Dundee, Forfar, and Montrose, were deemed capable of managing their own affairs and so were excluded from the administrative area of the county council. The county council held its first official meeting on 22 May 1890 at the County Buildings (now known as Forfar Sheriff Court), the county's main courthouse, which also served as the meeting place for the commissioners of supply. Robert Haldane-Duncan, 3rd Earl of Camperdown, a Liberal peer, was appointed the first chairman of the county council.

The 1889 Act also led to a review of boundaries, with exclaves being transferred to a county they actually bordered, and parishes which straddled more than one county being adjusted such that each parish was entirely in a single county. There were several such changes affecting the boundaries of Forfarshire.

Dundee was subsequently made a county of itself in 1894, also removing the city from Forfarshire for judicial and lieutenancy purposes. Arbroath, Brechin, Forfar and Montrose were brought within the administrative area of the county council in 1930, although Arbroath was classed as a large burgh, allowing its council to continue to deliver most local government functions itself.

In May 1928 the county council resolved to use the name 'Angus' for the area rather than the 'County of Forfar'. The council petitioned the government to officially change the name too. The government responded by directing all departments to use Angus, but noted that the legal name would remain Forfar until such time as it could be changed by statute. The statutory change of name from Forfar to Angus eventually took place in 1947 under the Local Government (Scotland) Act 1947.

Angus County Council was abolished in 1975 under the Local Government (Scotland) Act 1973, which replaced Scotland's counties, burghs and landward districts with a two-tier structure of upper-tier regions and lower-tier districts. A new Angus district was created covering most of the pre-1975 county, with the exceptions being that Monifieth and a number of villages immediately north of Dundee were transferred to an enlarged City of Dundee district, and Kettins was transferred to Perth and Kinross. Angus District Council was a lower-tier district level authority subordinate to the Tayside Regional Council. A lieutenancy area covering the same area as the new district was created at the same time.

Further local government reforms in 1996 under the Local Government etc. (Scotland) Act 1994 saw the regions and districts created in 1975 abolished and replaced with council areas providing all local government services. Angus district became one of the new council areas, taking on the functions of the abolished Tayside Regional Council. The council area regained Monifieth and the villages north of Dundee as part of the same reforms. The Angus lieutenancy area was adjusted to match the new council area in 1996. The Lord Lieutenant of Angus is appointed by the monarch. The boundaries of the historic county of Angus (as it was prior to the removal of Dundee in 1894) are still used for some limited official purposes connected with land registration, being a registration county.

== Geography ==
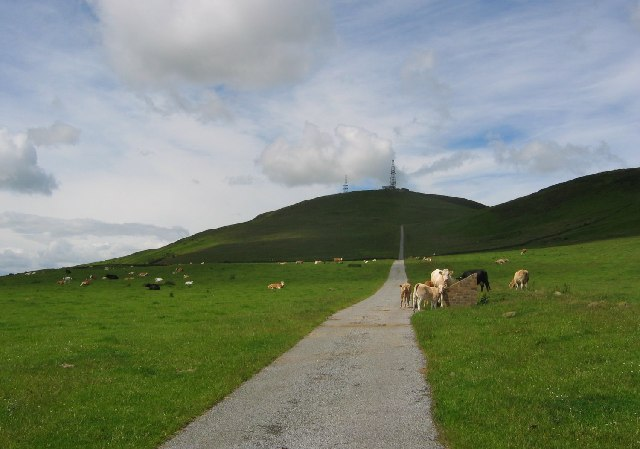
Craigowl Hill, highest of the Sidlaws, in southern Angus

Angus can be split into three geographic areas. To the north and west, the topography is mountainous. This is the area of the Grampian Mountains, Mounth hills and Five Glens of Angus, which is sparsely populated and where the main industry is hill farming. Glas Maol – the highest point in Angus at 1,068 metres (3,504 feet) – can be found here, on the tripoint boundary with Perthshire and Aberdeenshire. To the south and east the topography consists of rolling hills (such as the Sidlaws) bordering the sea; this area is well populated, with the larger towns. In between lies Strathmore (the Great Valley), which is a fertile agricultural area noted for the growing of potatoes, soft fruit and the raising of Aberdeen Angus cattle.

Montrose in the north east of the county is notable for its tidal basin and wildlife. Angus's coast is fairly regular, the most prominent features being the headlands of Scurdie Ness and Buddon Ness. The main bodies of water in the county are Loch Lee, Loch Brandy, Carlochy, Loch Wharral, Den of Ogil Reservoir, Loch of Forfar, Loch Fithie, Rescobie Loch, Balgavies Loch, Crombie Reservoir, Monikie Reservoirs, Long Loch, Lundie Loch, Loch of Kinnordy, Loch of Lintrathen, Backwater Reservoir, Auchintaple Loch, Loch Shandra.

== Demography ==
=== Population structure ===
Historical Angus population
Year	Pop.	±%
1801	65,068	—
1811	69,376	+6.6%
1821	74,436	+7.3%
1831	84,630	+13.7%
1841	106,890	+26.3%
1851	119,357	+11.7%
1911	118,748	−0.5%
1921	101,767	−14.3%
1931	93,803	−7.8%
1941	95,290	+1.6%
1951	96,777	+1.6%
1961	93,666	−3.2%
1971	90,554	−3.3%
1981	98,685	+9.0%
1991	107,866	+9.3%
2001	108,400	+0.5%
2011	116,000	+7.0%

In the 2001 census, the population of Angus was recorded as 108,400. 20.14% were under the age of 16, 63.15% were between 16 and 65 and 18.05% were aged 65 or above.

Of the 16 to 74 age group, 32.84% had no formal qualifications, 27.08% were educated to 'O' Grade/Standard Grade level, 14.38% to Higher level, 7.64% to HND or equivalent level and 18.06% to degree level.

=== Language in Angus ===
The most recent available census results (2001) show that Gaelic is spoken by 0.45% of the Angus population. This, similar to other lowland areas, is lower than the national average of 1.16%. These figures are self-reported and are not broken down into levels of fluency.

Category	Number	Percentage
All people	108,400	100
Understands spoken Gaelic but cannot speak, read or write it	351	0.32
Speaks reads and writes Gaelic	238	0.22
Speaks but neither reads nor writes Gaelic	188	0.17
Speaks and reads but cannot write Gaelic	59	0.05
Reads but neither speaks not writes Gaelic	61	0.06
Writes but neither speaks nor reads Gaelic	13	0.01
Reads and writes but does not speak Gaelic	22	0.02
Other combination of skills in Gaelic	7	0.01
No knowledge of Gaelic	107,461	99.13

Meanwhile, the 2011 census found that 38.4% of the population in Angus can speak Scots, above the Scottish average of 30.1%. This puts Angus as the council area with the sixth highest proficiency in Scots, behind only Shetland, Orkney, Moray, Aberdeenshire, and East Ayrshire.

The 2022 Scottish Census reported that out of 111,587 residents aged three and over, 43,917 (39.4%) considered themselves able to speak or read the Scots language. This puts Angus as the council area with the fifth highest proficiency in Scots, ahead of Orkney.

Historically, the dominant language in Angus was Pictish until the sixth to seventh centuries AD when the area became progressively gaelicised, with Pictish extinct by the mid-ninth century. Gaelic/Middle Irish began to retreat from lowland areas in the late-eleventh century and was absent from the Eastern lowlands by the fourteenth century. It was replaced there by Middle Scots, the contemporary local South Northern dialect of Modern Scots, while Gaelic persisted as a majority language in the Highlands and Hebrides until the 19th century.

Angus Council are planning to raise the status of Gaelic in the county by adopting a series of measures, including bilingual road signage, communications, vehicle livery and staffing.

The 2022 Scottish Census reported that out of 111,590 residents aged three and over, 933 (0.8%) considered themselves able to speak or read Gaelic, this represents an increase from the 588 (0.5%) from the 2011 census.

== Community council areas ==
As of 2018 Angus is divided into 25 community council areas and all apart from Friockheim district have an active council. The areas are: Aberlemno; Auchterhouse; Carnoustie; City of Brechin & District; Ferryden & Craig; Friockheim & District; Glamis; Hillside, Dun, & Logie Pert; Inverarity; Inveresk; Kirriemuir; Kirriemuir Landward East; Kirriemuir Landward West; Letham & District; Lunanhead & District; Monifieth; Monikie & Newbigging; Montrose; Muirhead, Birkhill and Liff; Murroes & Wellbank; Newtyle & Eassie; Royal Burgh of Arbroath; Royal Burgh of Forfar; Strathmartine; and Tealing.

== Parliamentary representation ==
=== UK Parliament ===
Angus is represented by two MPs for the UK Parliament.

- Angus and Perthshire Glens – covers the following wards: Kirriemuir and Dean, Brechin and Edzell, Forfar and District, and Montrose and District, and parts of Monifieth and Sidlaw; currently represented by Dave Doogan of the Scottish National Party, who was also the MP for the old Angus constituency.
- Arbroath and Broughty Ferry – cover parts of Monifieth and Sidlaw and Carnoustie and District from the old Dundee East constituency, and Arbroath East and Lunan, Arbroath West, Letham and Friockheim, and Monifieth and Sidlaw, and a part of Carnoustie and District from the now-abolished Angus constituency; currently represented by Lara Bird of the Scottish National Party.

=== Scottish Parliament ===
Angus is represented by two constituency MSPs for the Scottish Parliament.

- Angus North and Mearns – covers the north of Angus and a southern portion of Aberdeenshire, is represented by Dawn Black of the Scottish National Party.
- Angus South – covers the south of Angus, is represented by Lloyd Melville of the Scottish National Party.

In addition to the two constituency MSPs, Angus is also represented by seven MSPs for the North East Scotland electoral region.

== Transport ==
The Edinburgh-Aberdeen railway line runs along the coast, through Dundee and the towns of Monifieth, Carnoustie, Arbroath and Montrose.

There is a small airport at Dundee, which at present operates flights to London and Belfast.

== Settlements ==
The largest settlements in Angus

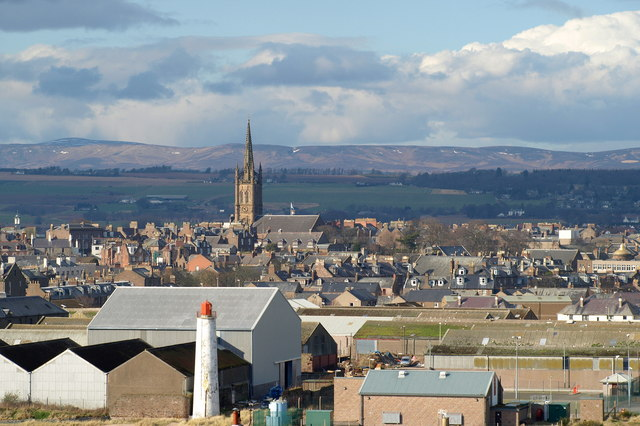
Montrose

Arbroath is the largest town in the modern county, followed by Forfar, the county town and administrative centre, and Montrose.

Largest settlements by population:

Settlement	Population (2020)
Arbroath	23,500
Forfar	14,120
Montrose	11,730
Carnoustie	11,310
Monifieth	8,860
Brechin	7,230
Kirriemuir	6,060
Birkhill	2,010
Letham	1,640
Ferryden	1,220

== Historic parishes ==
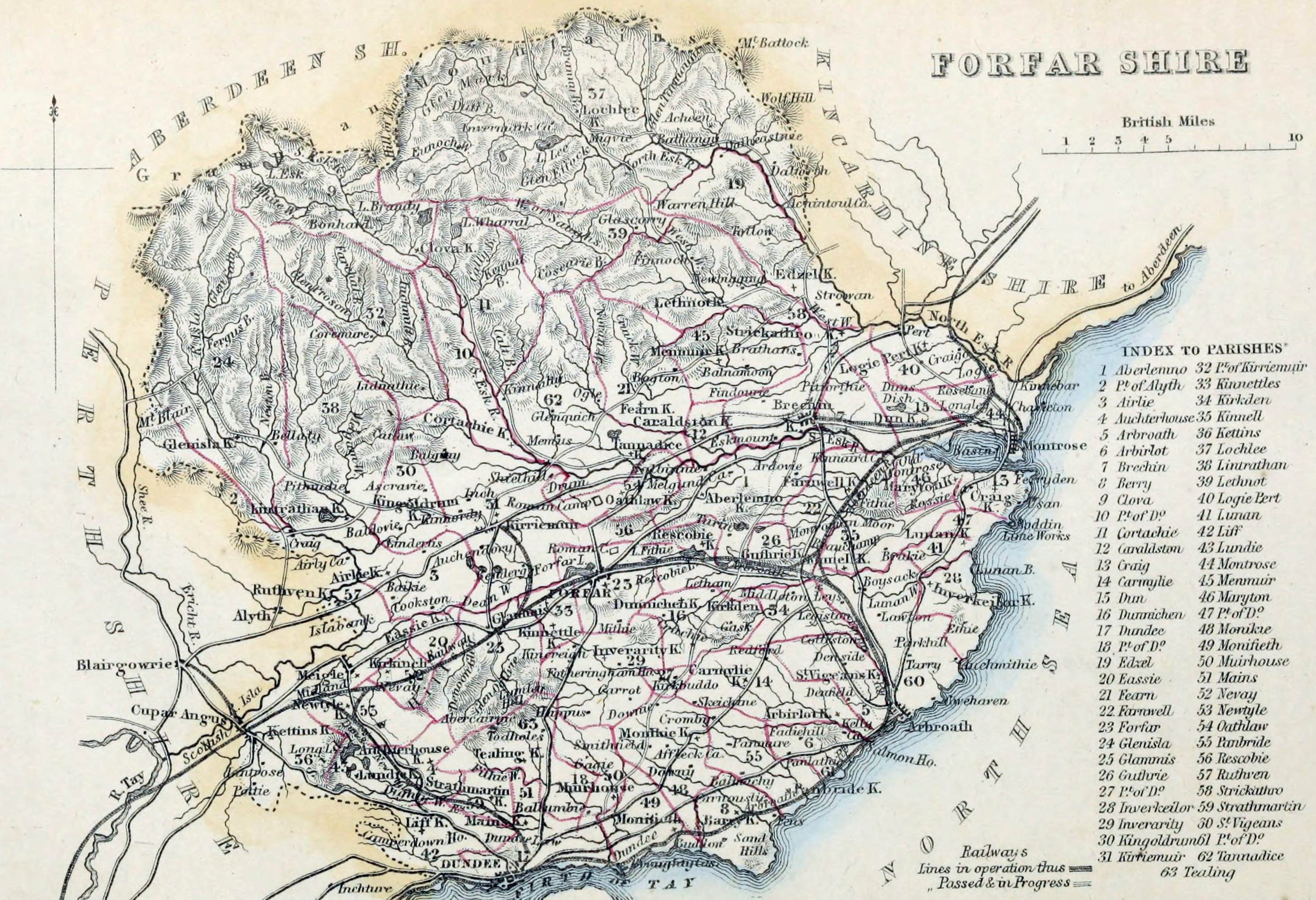
Angusshire (Forfarshire) Civil Parish map, c. 1854

Forfarshire was divided into parishes, some of which share the name with current settlements:

- Aberlemno
- Airlie
- Alyth (part of)
- Arbirlot
- Arbroath
- Auchterhouse
- Barry
- Brechin
- Careston
- Carmyllie
- Clova
- Cortachy
- Coupar
- Craig
- Dun
- Dundee
- Dunnichen
- Eassie
- Edzell
- Farnell
- Fern
- Forfar
- Fowlis Easter
- Glamis
- Glenisla
- Guthrie
- Inverarity
- Inverkeilor
- Kettins
- Kingoldrum
- Kinnell
- Kinnettles
- Kirkden/Friockheim
- Kirriemuir
- Lethnot
- Liff
- Lintrathen
- Lochlee
- Logie Pert
- Lunan
- Lundie
- Mains and Strathmartine
- Maryton
- Menmuir
- Monifieth
- Monikie
- Montrose
- Murroes/Muirhouse
- Nevay
- Newtyle
- Oathlaw
- Panbride
- Rescobie
- Ruthven
- St Vigeans
- Stracathro
- Tannadice
- Tealing

== Education ==
Secondary schools in Angus:

- Arbroath Academy
- Arbroath High School
- Brechin High School
- Carnoustie High School
- Forfar Academy
- Monifieth High School
- Montrose Academy
- Webster's High School

== Places of interest ==
- Aberlemno Sculptured Stones
- Arbroath Abbey
- Barry Mill
- Brechin Cathedral
- Brechin Castle
- Brechin Round Tower
- Caledonian Railway (Brechin)
- Cairngorms National Park
- Corrie Fee National Nature Reserve
- Eassie Stone
- Edzell Castle
- Glamis Castle
- Glenesk Folk Museum
- House of Dun
- Loch of Kinnordy Nature Reserve
- Meffan Institute
- Monboddo House
- Montrose Air Station Heritage Centre
- Montrose Basin Nature Reserve
- Montrose Museum

== Sister areas ==
- – Yantai, Shandong, China.

== Surnames ==
Most common surnames in Angus (Forfarshire) at the time of the 1881 United Kingdom census:

1. Smith
2. Robertson
3. Anderson
4. Stewart
5. Scott
6. Mitchell
7. Brown
8. Duncan
9. Milne
10. Thomson

== See also ==
- Earl of Angus
- List of places in Angus
- List of counties of Scotland 1890–1975
- Medieval Diocese of Angus
- Scheduled monuments in Angus
- List of Category A listed buildings in Angus
