= Kettins =

Coordinates: 56.536807°N 3.240619°W

- Location within Perth and Kinross
- OS grid reference: NO238390
- Council area: Perth and Kinross
- Lieutenancy area: Perth and Kinross
- Country: Scotland
- Sovereign state: United Kingdom
- Post town: BLAIRGOWRIE
- Postcode district: PH13
- Dialling code: 01828
- Police: Scotland
- Fire: Scottish
- Ambulance: Scottish
- UK Parliament: Angus and Perthshire Glens
- Scottish Parliament: Perth Mid Scotland and Fife

Kettins is a village in Perth and Kinross, Scotland about 14 miles (23 kilometres) northeast of Perth and 11 miles (18 kilometres) northwest of Dundee. It is 1 mile (1.5 kilometres) from Coupar Angus, north of the A923 road.

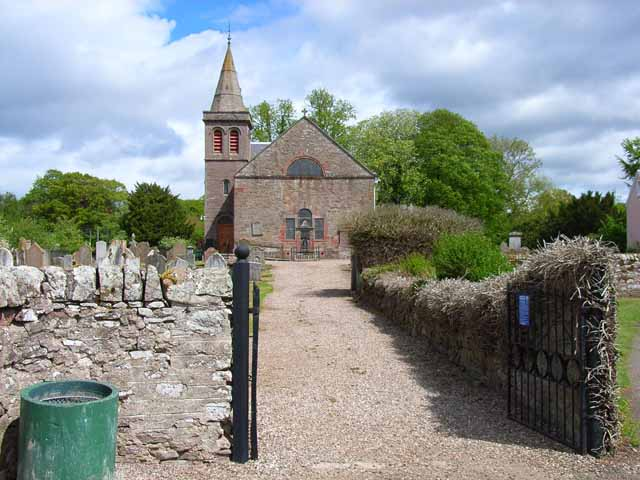
Kettins Church

== Notable people ==
- Robert Trail minister of the parish 1746 to 1753
- John Ker minister 1744/45

== See also ==
- Coupar Angus
