= Max Wall =

English actor and music hall artist (1908–1990)

- Wall as Professor Wallofski
- Born: Maxwell George Lorimer; 12 March 1908; Lambeth, London, England
- Died: 21 May 1990 (aged 82); Westminster, London, England
- Resting place: Highgate Cemetery, London, England
- Occupations: Actor, comedian
- Years active: 1934–1990
- Children: 5

Maxwell George Lorimer (12 March 1908 – 21 May 1990), known professionally as Max Wall, was an English actor and comedian whose performing career covered music hall, films, television and theatre.

== Early years ==
Wall was born Maxwell George Lorimer, son of the successful music hall entertainer Jack (Jock) Lorimer, a Scottish comedy actor from Forres, known for his songs and dancing, and his wife Stella (born Maud Clara Mitchison). He was born near the Oval, at 37 Glenshaw Mansions, Brixton Road, Lambeth, London SW9. In 1916, during a World War I air raid, Max and his elder brother Alex were saved from death by a cast-iron bed frame, but his younger brother Bunty and their Aunt Betty, who was looking after them, were killed by a bomb dropped from a German Zeppelin which also destroyed their house.

Max and Alex went to live with their father and his family, whilst their mother went to live with Harry Wallace, whom she had met on tour. When their father died of tuberculosis in 1920, aged 37, their mother married Harry Wallace, and they all moved to a pub in Essex.

== Career ==
=== Early career ===
Wall auditioned for a part with a touring theatre company, and made his stage début at the age of 14 as Jack in Mother Goose with a travelling pantomime company in Devon and Cornwall featuring George Lacey. In 1925 he was a speciality dancer in the London Revue at the Lyceum. He became determined not to rely on his father's name, so he abbreviated Maxwell to Max, and his stepfather's name Wallace, to Wall.

He is best remembered for his ludicrously attired and hilariously strutting Professor Wallofski. John Cleese has acknowledged Wall's influence on his own "Ministry of Silly Walks" sketch for Monty Python's Flying Circus. After appearing in many musicals and stage comedies in the 1930s, Wall's career went into decline, and he was reduced to working in obscure nightclubs. He then joined the Royal Air Force during World War II and served for three years until he was invalided out in 1943.

Wall married dancer Marion Pola, and the couple had five children. In an interview with the family in the mid-1950s, Tit-Bits magazine wrote

The kind of private jokes you find in all the nicest families flourish with the Walls. After Max and his wife, Marion, had their first son, Michael, it seemed kind of natural to make a corner in names beginning with 'M', and there are now Melvyn (aged nine), Martin (nearly five) and the four-month-old twins Meredith and Maxine. ... In the same way, because the Walls, like other couples married during the war, were eventually thrilled when they found a house with four walls of their own, they decided to call it just that, only Martin arrived and made it 'Five Walls'.

In a rare outing to the musical stage he played Hines in the original London production of The Pajama Game, which opened at the London Coliseum in October 1955 and ran for 588 performances. In that year he began an affair with Jennifer Chimes, the 1955 Miss Great Britain. He divorced his wife and married Chimes in 1956. The relationship attracted widespread press condemnation. In 1957 Wall experienced mental health issues that affected his work. Chimes and Wall divorced in 1962.

=== Re-emergence ===
In 1966, he appeared as Père Ubu in Alfred Jarry's Ubu Roi, and in 1972 he toured with Mott the Hoople on their "Rock n' Roll Circus Tour", gaining a new audience. Wall re-emerged during the 1970s when producers and directors rediscovered his comic talents, along with the expressive power of his tragic clown face and the distinctive sad falling cadences of his voice. He secured television appearances and, having attracted Samuel Beckett's attention, he won parts in Waiting for Godot in 1979 and Krapp's Last Tape in 1984. His straight acting gained him this review in 1974: "Max Wall makes Olivier look like an amateur in The Entertainer at Greenwich Theatre...".

He also appeared in Crossroads (as Walter Soper, 1982 to 1983), Coronation Street (as Harry Payne, 1978) and what was then Emmerdale Farm (as Arthur Braithwaite, 1978). He played ex-con Ernie Dodds in Minder in 1982, alongside George Cole.

=== Later work ===
Wall played one of the inventors in the 1968 film Chitty Chitty Bang Bang and in 1977 he was seen as King Bruno the Questionable in Terry Gilliam's film Jabberwocky. In the 1970s and 80s, Wall occasionally performed a one-man stage show, Aspects of Max Wall, in which he recaptured the humour of old-time music hall theatre.

On 1 April 1977, Wall's version of Ian Dury's song "England's Glory" (which featured in Dury's stage show Apples) was issued on Stiff Records (BUY 12), backed with "Dream Tobacco" and given away with the album Hits Greatest Stiffs. Wall also appeared onstage with Dury at the Hammersmith Odeon in 1978, but was poorly received, and said "They only want the walk".

In 1980 Wall appeared in Thames Television's twelve-part series Born and Bred as retired music hall legend Tommy Tonsley, trying with various degrees of success to keep his huge south London family in line. In 1981, he played "Ernie", a central character in the Minder TV series episode "The Birdman of Wormwood Scrubs".

Between 1982 and 1984 he appeared as Tombs in the BBC Two adaptation of Jane based on the Daily Mirror comic-strip character and filmed with similar "comic-strip frames". In the second series his place in the castlist was upgraded to second, after Glynis Barber.

In 1987 Wall appeared as Flintwinch in the two-part film adaptation of Dickens's Little Dorrit. His last film appearance was in 1989 in the 12-minute film A Fear of Silence, a dark tale of a man who drives a stranger to a confession of murder by answering only "yes" or "no" to his questions; those two words, repeated, were his only dialogue. The film won a gold award in the New York Film and TV Festival.

== Death ==
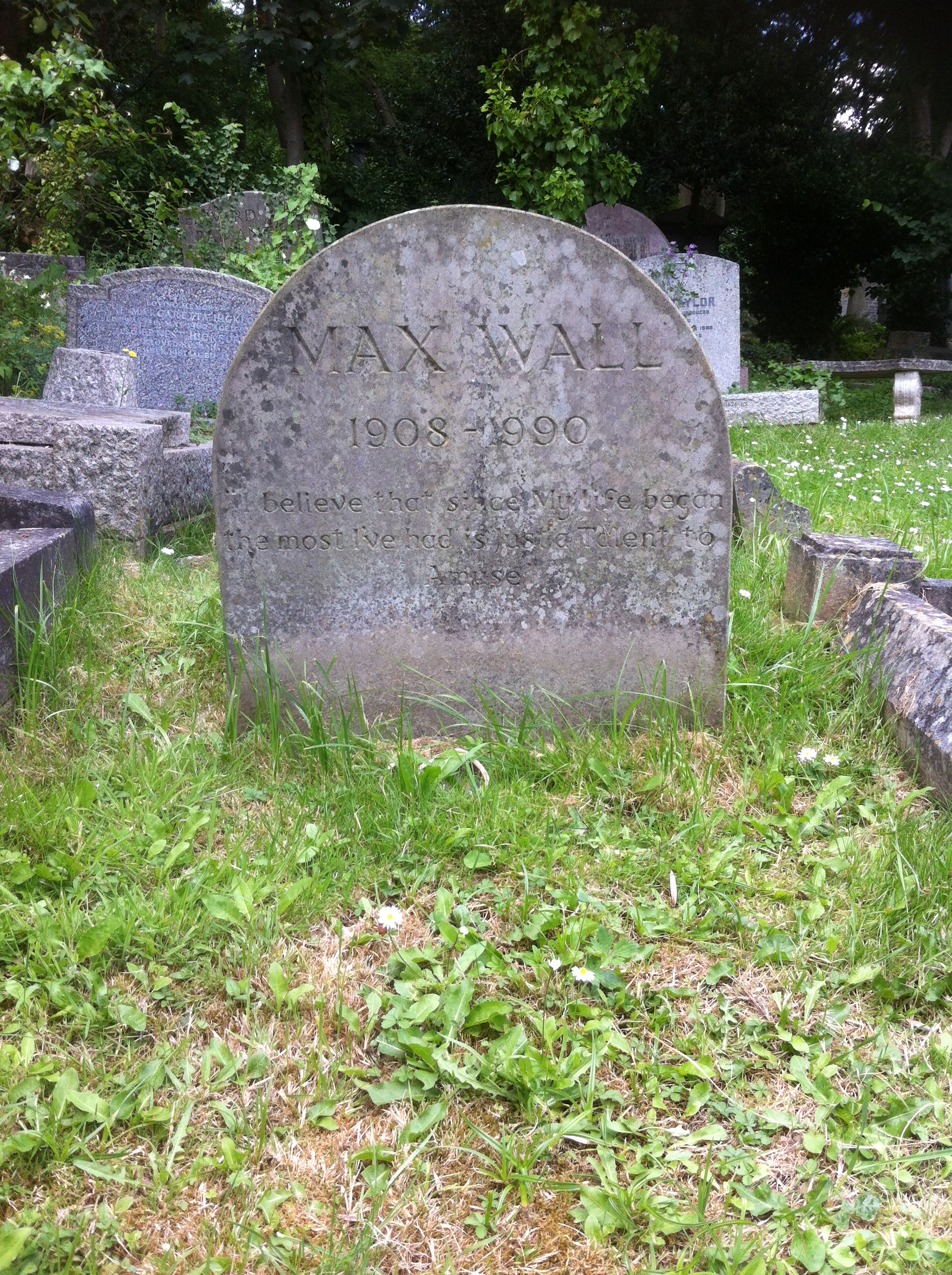
Wall's grave in Highgate Cemetery

On the afternoon of 20 May 1990 Wall fell at Simpson's-in-the-Strand in central London, fracturing his skull. He was conveyed by ambulance to Westminster Hospital in an unconscious state, but never regained consciousness, and died there early in the next morning, at the age of 82. Wall’s youngest son, Meredith (Merry), was at his bedside as he died. His body was buried at Highgate Cemetery.

In his later years, Wall lived in a rented room at 45, Southbrook Road, Lee Green, South East London.

Wall had four sons and a daughter.

== Legacy ==
There is a Max Wall Society, which aims to perpetuate his memory. In 2006 the Society placed an unofficial blue plaque on Wall's birthplace in South London.

== Filmography ==
Year	Title	Role	Notes
1934	On the Air	Boots	
1938	Save a Little Sunshine	Walter	
1950	Come Dance with Me	Manager	
1968	Chitty Chitty Bang Bang	Inventor	
1969	The Nine Ages of Nakedness	Roundhead Leader	Segment: The Cavaliers
1974	Thriller	Jorg Kesselheim/George Thibedon	Episode: A Killer in Every Coroner
1975	One of Our Dinosaurs Is Missing	Juggler	
1977	Jabberwocky	King Bruno the Questionable	
1978	The Hound of the Baskervilles	Arthur Barrymore	
1978-1980	Born and Bred	Tommy Tonsley	Thames Television; 10 episodes
1978-1979	Coronation Street	Harry Payne	6 episodes
1979	Emmerdale	Arthur Braithwaite	6 episodes
1979	Hanover Street	Harry Pike	
1982	Minder	Ernie Dodds	Episode: The Birdman of Wormwood Scrubs
1983	Max Wall – It's Got To Be Funny	Himself in documentary	
1987	Little Dorrit	Flintwinch	
1988	We Think the World of You	Tom	
1990	Strike It Rich	Bowels	
1990	Dark River	The Stranger	TV film

== See also ==
- Lorimer, a surname of Scottish origin
