= Jack Lorimer =

Scottish entertainer (1883–1920)

Jack "Jock" Lorimer (1883–1920) was a Scottish comedy actor and popular music hall entertainer. Originally from Forres in Scotland, he performed as "The Hielan' Laddie" with success in London and on tour in the United States.

His son was the famous comedian Max Wall.
