= Forfar =

Coordinates: 56.64423°N 2.88842°W

Forfar: Scottish Gaelic: Baile Fharfair; Scots: Farfar
- County town and administrative centre
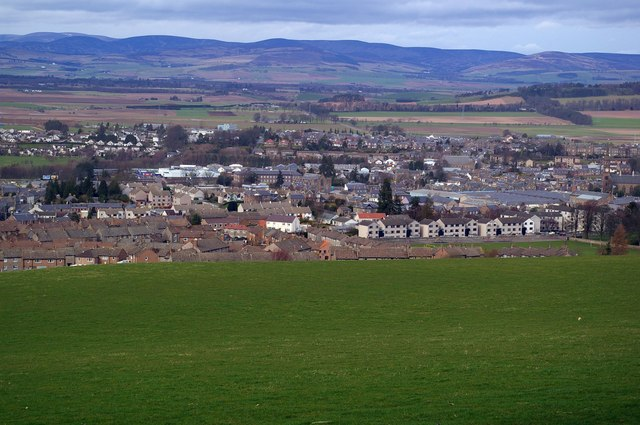
- View of Forfar and countryside north of Forfar

- Location within Angus
- Population: 16,240 (2022)
- Demonym: Forfarian
- OS grid reference: NO455505
  - Edinburgh: 49 mi (79 km)
  - London: 372 mi (599 km)
- Council area: Angus
- Lieutenancy area: Angus
- Country: Scotland
- Sovereign state: United Kingdom
- Post town: FORFAR
- Postcode district: DD8
- Dialling code: 01307
- Police: Scotland
- Fire: Scottish
- Ambulance: Scottish
- UK Parliament: Angus and Perthshire Glens
- Scottish Parliament: Angus North and Mearns

Forfar (/ˈfɔːrfər/; Scots: Farfar, Scottish Gaelic: Baile Fharfair) is a market town, historical royal burgh and the county town of Angus, Scotland, and the administrative centre for Angus Council, with a new multi-million-pound office complex located on the outskirts of the town. In 2022, Forfar had a population of 13,801.

The town lies in Strathmore and is situated just off the main A90 road between Perth and Aberdeen, with Dundee (the nearest city) being 13 miles (21 km) away. It is approximately 5 miles (8 km) from Glamis Castle, seat of the Bowes-Lyon family and ancestral home of Queen Elizabeth the Queen Mother, and where Princess Margaret, younger sister of Queen Elizabeth II, was born in 1930.

Forfar dates back to the temporary Roman occupation of the area, and was subsequently held by the Picts and the Kingdom of Scotland. During the Scottish Wars of Independence, Forfar was occupied by English forces before being recaptured by the Scots and presented to Robert the Bruce. Forfar has been a major manufacturing centre for linen and jute. Today the main activities are agriculture and tourism around scenic Strathmore. The local glens are visited by hill-walkers, and there are ski-slopes in the mountains. The town is home to a number of local sporting teams, including the League Two football club, Forfar Athletic.

The Forfar bridie, a Scottish meat pastry snack, is traditionally identified with the town.

== Etymology ==
The exact origin of the name Forfar is uncertain. One suggestion is that the name is Gaelic and means "a cold point", involving, fuar meaning "cold, chilly", and bhar meaning "a point".

== History ==
=== Early history ===
During one of the Roman invasions of modern-day Scotland, the Romans established a major camp at Battledykes, approximately 3 miles (5 km) north of Forfar; this camp was analysed to have held 50,000 to 60,000 men. From Battledykes northward the Romans established a succession of camps including Stracathro, Raedykes and Normandykes.

=== Middle Ages ===
During the Middle Ages, a "claimant" to the throne, the daughter of the leader of the Meic Uilleim, who were descendants of King Duncan II, had her brains dashed out on Forfar market cross in 1230 while still an infant.

During the First War of Scottish Independence, the castle of Forfar was held by the English. After Robert the Bruce's victory over the Earl of Buchan, Philip, the Forester of Platane, together with some of his friends, raised ladders against the wall and, climbing over, surprised the garrison and killed them. He then yielded the castle to Bruce, who rewarded him and gave instructions for its slighting.

=== Early modern history ===
During the 16th and 17th century, several witch trials took place in Forfar, the last of which took place in 1662 and in which 52 people were accused. At the time, Forfar was a town of around 1000 inhabitants, with an additional 2000 people residing in the county.

=== The accidental killing of the 6th Earl of Strathmore ===
After attending the funeral of a daughter of Patrick Carnegie of Lour on the 9th of May 1728, Forfar became the place of the accidental killing of Charles Lyon, 6th Earl of Strathmore and Kinghorne by James Carnegie of Finhaven. Lyon of Brigton who was of foul temper, bullied Carnegie throughout the day during and by 9pm a mortally drunk Carnegie was attack by Lyon of Brigton who threw him into a kennel, (sewer) on Castle Street. Carnegie humiliated drew his sword and stumbled towards the retreating Brigton. The Earl stepped in between them at the tragic moment and was run through by Carnegie. He died 49 hours later. The subsequent trial established the "not guilty" verdict in Scots Law.

== Industrial history ==
Like other parts of Angus, Forfar was home to a very successful textile industry during and after the Industrial Revolution. In the late 18th century the firm of William Don & Co. (later William and John Don & Co) was founded in the town. The firm originally bought and sold webs of linen which were woven in local cottages, although it also operated a small weaving shed. In 1865 the firm merged with A J Buist, a Dundee based firm, and began construction of St James Works in Forfar. The partnership also operated mills in Dundee and later built Station Works in Forfar, which contained some 300 looms. Workers' housing was built by the firm in Forfar. Don Brothers, Buist & Company Ltd, as the firm was known from 1904, built another works in Forfar, at Strang Street, in 1929. In 1960 it merged with another Dundee firm, Low Brothers & Co (Dundee) Ltd, eventually becoming Don & Low (Holdings) Ltd. By the 1980s the Don & Low group was the United Kingdom's biggest polypropylene textile extrusion and weaving unit. The firm retains premises in Forfar, mainly producing woven and non-woven polypropylene industrial textile products and plastic food packaging. In 1958 Don Brothers, Buist & Co Ltd acquired a controlling interest in another Forfar based-textile firm, Moffat & Son Ltd, who operated Haugh Works in South Street. Another important Forfar textile firm was J & A Craik & Company, Linen and Jute Manufacturers, which was based at the Manor Works. Craiks was started in 1863 when James Craik obtained land in Forfar to build the Manor Works and the company survived until 1981, the year in which it became part of the Low and Bonar group. Craiks owned Forfar Fabrics Ltd, incorporated in 1965, which amalgamated with Low & Bonar Textiles Limited in 1981. The jute manufacturers, John Lowson, Jnr & Co Ltd, also operated in Forfar, operating out of Victoria Works.

== Social history ==
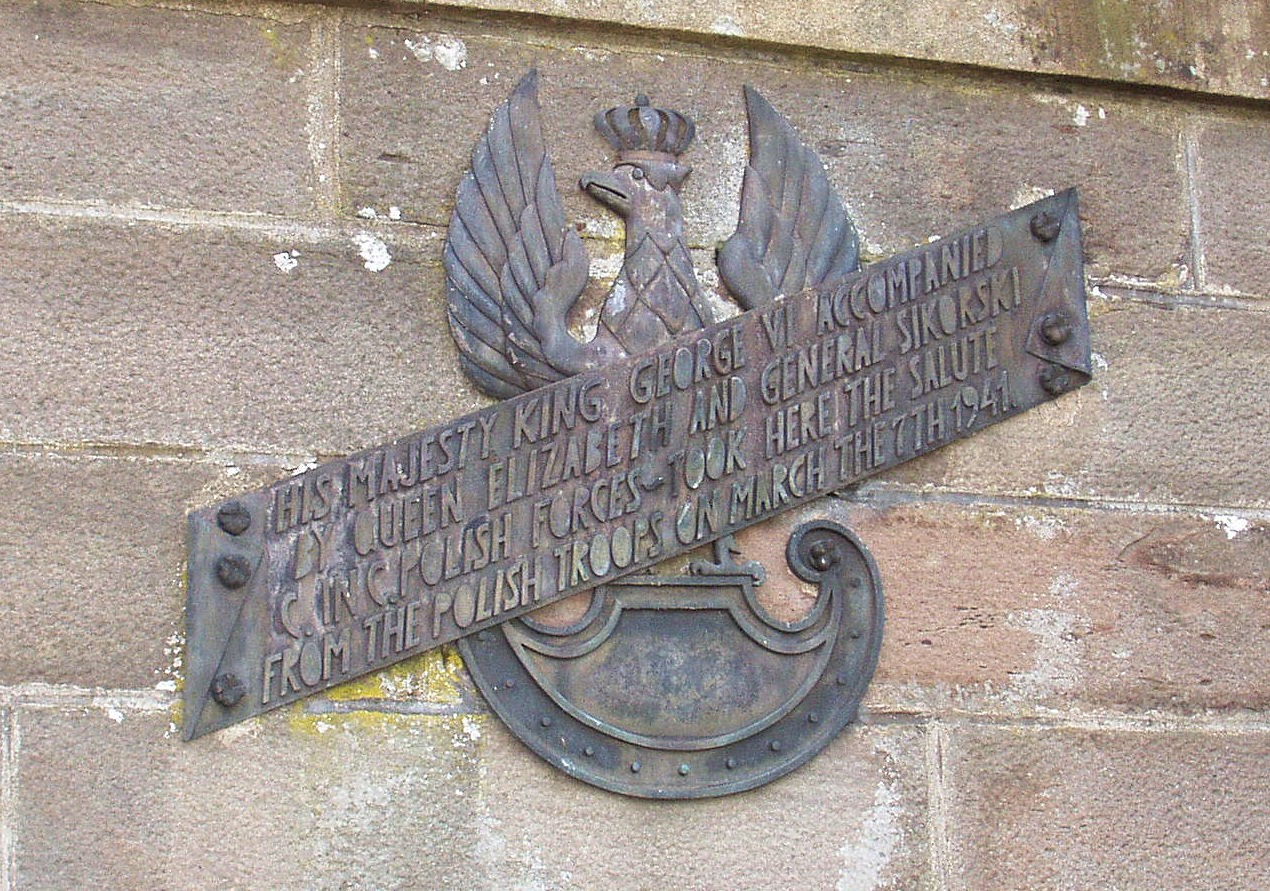
Memorial plaque to the Polish Army in Forfar

The Meffan Museum is in the heart of the town. It was built by a daughter of the Provost Meffan as a bequest in 1898. It is home of the Forfar story. It is also an art gallery and a meeting place for local speakers, summer clubs for children and groups. The story of Forfar takes visitors from the history of the little cobbler shops to the burning of the witch Helen Guthrie. There is also a good selection of Pictish stones found in and around Forfar and Kirriemuir. The Large Class I Pictish stone, with a rare carving of a flower, is called the Dunnichen Stone. It was found in the early 19th century when a farmer from the East Mains of Dunnichen was ploughing. It was initially displayed at a church in the vicinity, then at Dunnichen House. In 1966 it was relocated at St Vigeans and finally moved to Dundee museum in 1972. After the Meffan Institute had been renovated it was brought to Forfar on a long-term loan where it is displayed alongside the Kirriemuir Sculptured Stones. There is a canoe, excavated from Forfar Loch, that dates back to the 11th century (one of two that were found).

=== Modern history ===
In 1911 more than 20% of workers in Forfar were employed in the jute industry. Employment levels in this industry generally dramatically declined in other parts of Angus, including Dundee, during the next four decades. Notably in Dundee, the centre of the British jute industry, more than 40.4% of the working population had worked in the jute industry in 1911, but by 1951 this had fallen to just 18.5%. In Forfar, however this trend was not followed as percentage of the workforce employed in the jute industry had actually risen to 24.4% by 1951.

In the town there is a metal plaque to General Sikorski and the Polish troops commemorating the visit of King George VI and Queen Elizabeth to the town on 7 March 1941. The plaque is located on a wall on Market Street below Forfar Sheriff Court. It was here on 7 March 1941 that the royal couple, along with General Sikorski, took the salute in the march past of the Polish troops.

Queen Elizabeth II and the Duke of Edinburgh visited the town and surrounding area in 2004 (the first time in around 30 years) and again in 2011. HRH Prince Charles, the Duke of Rothesay, visited the town in April 2012 to take the salute of the Black Watch during the regiment's homecoming parade, marking its return from a six-month tour of duty in Afghanistan.

== Governance ==
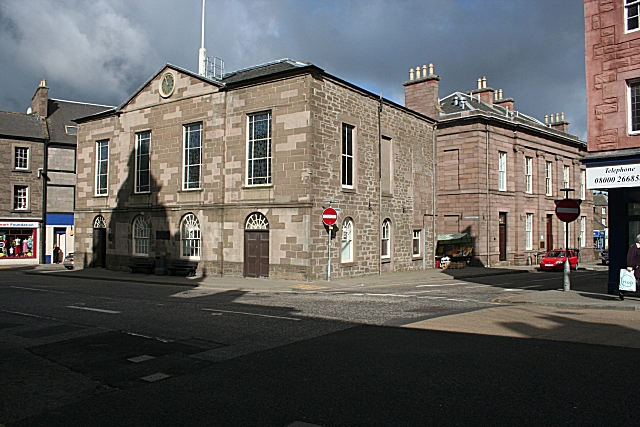
Forfar Town and County Hall

Forfar is a parish, town and former royal burgh. The meeting place of the burgh was the Forfar Town and County Hall. It is the county town of Angus, which was officially known as Forfarshire from the 18th century until 1928. The town is represented within Angus Council by the Forfar & District ward, from which four councillors are elected. The members elected from this ward are, as of 2021; Lynne Devine (Scottish National Party), Braden Davy (Scottish Conservative and Unionist), Colin Brown (Independent) and Ian McLaren (Independent).

== Demography ==
=== Population ===
At the 2022 Scottish census, Forfar had a population of 16,240, making it the second-largest settlement in Angus, after Arbroath.

== Transport ==
=== Road ===
The town is located just off the main A90 Dundee to Aberdeen road; having once passed through the town centre, the bypass was completed in 1987.

=== Railway ===
The nearest stations to Forfar are Dundee, Carnoustie and Arbroath, which are all around 14 miles (23 km) away. Connections to the rest of Scotland are available on the Edinburgh–Dundee line; the Glasgow–Dundee line, via Perth; and the Dundee to Aberdeen line.

The town was once served by Forfar railway station, which ran goods and passenger lines until 3 September 1967 when it closed for passenger transport as part of the Beeching cuts; a goods line from Perth continued until 1982. The station was located on the main line of the Caledonian Railway from Glasgow Buchanan Street to Aberdeen, which was the furthest north link in the chain of the West Coast Main Line from London Euston. Lines also went to Dundee, Arbroath, Brechin and Kirriemuir. The station has since been demolished and replaced by a small housing estate. However, a major locomotive shed remains and is in use for vehicle body manufacture. Some bridges and cuttings still survive but the site of the goods station, which was the town's original railway station before the one near the County Buildings was built, is now mainly residential properties.

=== Buses ===
Local bus services are operated predominantly by Stagecoach Strathtay, Moffat & Williamson and JP Coaches. Key routes connect the town with Dundee, Kirriemuir, Edzell and Arbroath.

Ember route E1 from Aberdeen to Edinburgh serves a prebooked stop here.

== Climate ==
As with most of the British Isles, Forfar has an oceanic climate (Köppen: Cfb). The nearest weather station to Forfar is located around 3 miles (5 km) north of Forfar, and is 91 m (299 ft) above sea level.

Climate data for Forfar (91 m asl, averages 1991–2020)
Month	Jan	Feb	Mar	Apr	May	Jun	Jul	Aug	Sep	Oct	Nov	Dec	Year
Record high °C (°F)	14.4 (57.9)	14.8 (58.6)	21.5 (70.7)	22.7 (72.9)	24.0 (75.2)	28.1 (82.6)	28.5 (83.3)	28.2 (82.8)	25.3 (77.5)	21.2 (70.2)	16.7 (62.1)	14.8 (58.6)	28.5 (83.3)
Mean daily maximum °C (°F)	5.8 (42.4)	6.6 (43.9)	8.7 (47.7)	11.2 (52.2)	14.3 (57.7)	17.0 (62.6)	18.8 (65.8)	18.6 (65.5)	16.1 (61.0)	12.3 (54.1)	8.5 (47.3)	5.9 (42.6)	12.0 (53.6)
Daily mean °C (°F)	2.8 (37.0)	3.5 (38.3)	5.0 (41.0)	7.2 (45.0)	10.0 (50.0)	12.6 (54.7)	14.4 (57.9)	14.2 (57.6)	12.0 (53.6)	8.8 (47.8)	5.3 (41.5)	2.8 (37.0)	8.2 (46.8)
Mean daily minimum °C (°F)	−0.2 (31.6)	0.3 (32.5)	1.8 (35.2)	3.2 (37.8)	5.6 (42.1)	8.3 (46.9)	9.9 (49.8)	9.7 (49.5)	7.9 (46.2)	5.2 (41.4)	2.0 (35.6)	−0.2 (31.6)	4.4 (39.9)
Record low °C (°F)	−18.9 (−2.0)	−18.4 (−1.1)	−14.1 (6.6)	−6.9 (19.6)	−3.7 (25.3)	−1.3 (29.7)	1.8 (35.2)	1.1 (34.0)	−2.2 (28.0)	−7.6 (18.3)	−13.8 (7.2)	−19.1 (−2.4)	−19.1 (−2.4)
Average precipitation mm (inches)	79.1 (3.11)	54.8 (2.16)	57.2 (2.25)	49.7 (1.96)	52.9 (2.08)	66.1 (2.60)	67.5 (2.66)	75.5 (2.97)	61.9 (2.44)	98.9 (3.89)	81.0 (3.19)	74.6 (2.94)	818.9 (32.24)
Average precipitation days (≥ 1.0 mm)	12.7	10.5	9.5	9.2	11.0	12.0	9.4	9.8	11.1	12.1	12.3	11.3	130.9
Mean monthly sunshine hours	51.1	77.5	113.5	161.1	195.7	159.0	166.7	156.2	122.5	98.0	63.3	46.5	1,411
Source 1: Met Office (precipitation days 1981–2010)
Source 2: Starlings Roost Weather

== Local sport ==
=== Football ===
The town is home to semi-professional football club Forfar Athletic, who are members of the Scottish Professional Football League and currently play in League Two and two SJFA clubs, Forfar West End, and Forfar United, who both currently play in the Midlands Football League. Forfar Athletic's ground, Station Park, plays host to matches featuring Dundee United Reserves.

Youth and women's football is available in the town, with Forfar Boys F.C (boys only), Lochside Boys F.C (boys only) and Forfar Farmington F.C. (boys, girls and women). All the clubs have SFA Quality Mark Award at some level.

=== Rugby league ===
Forfar has a National League rugby league team, the Strathmore Silverbacks, who share Inchmacoble Park as their home ground with the local rugby union team.

=== Rugby union ===
Rugby Union is represented in the town by Strathmore Rugby Football Club, who play their home games at Inchmacoble Park, beside Forfar Loch. The club has men's and ladies' teams.

=== Golf ===
The Forfar Golf Club, founded in 1871, has the fourth oldest 18 hole course in the world, and is the first club to have an 18-hole course from inception and inauguration. The course was designed by Old Tom Morris, and in 1926 alterations recommended by five time Open Championship winner James Braid were implemented. The letter with Braid's recommendations is on display in the clubhouse.

The Forfar Golf Club has hosted the Scottish PGA Championship twice, once in 1932 and again in 1966.

=== Cricket ===
Strathmore Cricket Club, founded in 1862, has played at Lochside Park since 1873.

=== Other sports and facilities ===
The town has a dedicated community campus.

There is a skatepark near the Forfar loch. Forfar has an ice rink which was built in the early 1990s and this is home to the local curling club.

There are three bowling clubs in Forfar: Forfar Bowling Club, Canmore Bowling Club and Forfar Indoor Bowling Club. Both Forfar Bowling Club and Canmore Bowling Club have outdoor bowling greens.

Forfar Loch is home to Forfar Sailing Club.

Angus Gliding Club operates at Roundyhill, between Glamis and Kirriemuir.

== Education ==
Forfar has three primary schools:

- Whitehills Primary School on Service Road contains a Gaelic Medium Unit where pupils are educated exclusively through the medium of Scottish Gaelic. The head teachers are Coureen Peters & Elaine Gallon (acting).
- Strathmore Primary School is on St James' Road. The head teacher is Jennifer Garnes.
- Langlands Primary School is on Glamis Road. The school reopened in May 2009 after the demolishing of the original buildings and an extensive period of rebuilding and landscaping. The head teacher is Jayne McLean.

There is one secondary school in the town:

- Forfar Academy on Kirriemuir road is one of the largest schools in Angus, with a roll of around 1,200 pupils.

In 2007, the Forfar-Carnoustie Schools Project made major changes to schools in Forfar, with closure of the following primary schools:

Chapelpark Primary School on Academy Street (the former Forfar Academy) opened in 1967 and was active for 40 years before closing in 2007. The pupils were re-located to Strathmore Primary and Whitehills Primary. The building continued in use as a school, initially by Whitehills Primary until their new school was completed in early 2008. It was then home to Langlands Primary, until the new school on that site was completed in May 2009. In 2016 it was decided that it would be turned into council flats, and work was completed in the summer of 2018. It won three awards, the Best Group Housing project award on November 15th, 2018, the SURF Housing award on December 6th, 2018, and the Angus Design Award for Best Restoration/Conversion in 2019. On the 1st of July, 2019, Prince Edward, Duke of Edinburgh visited the site as part of his first tour of Forfar after becoming the Earl of Forfar.

Kirkriggs Primary School in St. James' Road was closed in 2007. Pupils were re-located to Langlands until the new school on this site (Strathmore Primary) was completed in early 2008.

Wellbrae Primary School closed in 2007. Pupils were sent to Chapelpark Primary School and later to Whitehills Primary School. The play areas of Wellbrae were all concrete. On the 22nd of October 2016, it burned to the ground in an arson attack.

== Healthcare ==
The local community hospital, the Whitehills Health and Community Care Centre, was built on the site of the old Whitehills Hospital building (the former hospital for infectious diseases) and opened in Spring 2005. The new hospital replaced Forfar Infirmary, formerly the town's main hospital, as well as Whitehills Hospital. The Infirmary has since been completely demolished.

The Fyfe-Jamieson maternity hospital closed some time ago; it was across the road from the Forfar Academy, but the site has since been built over with houses.

== Places of worship ==
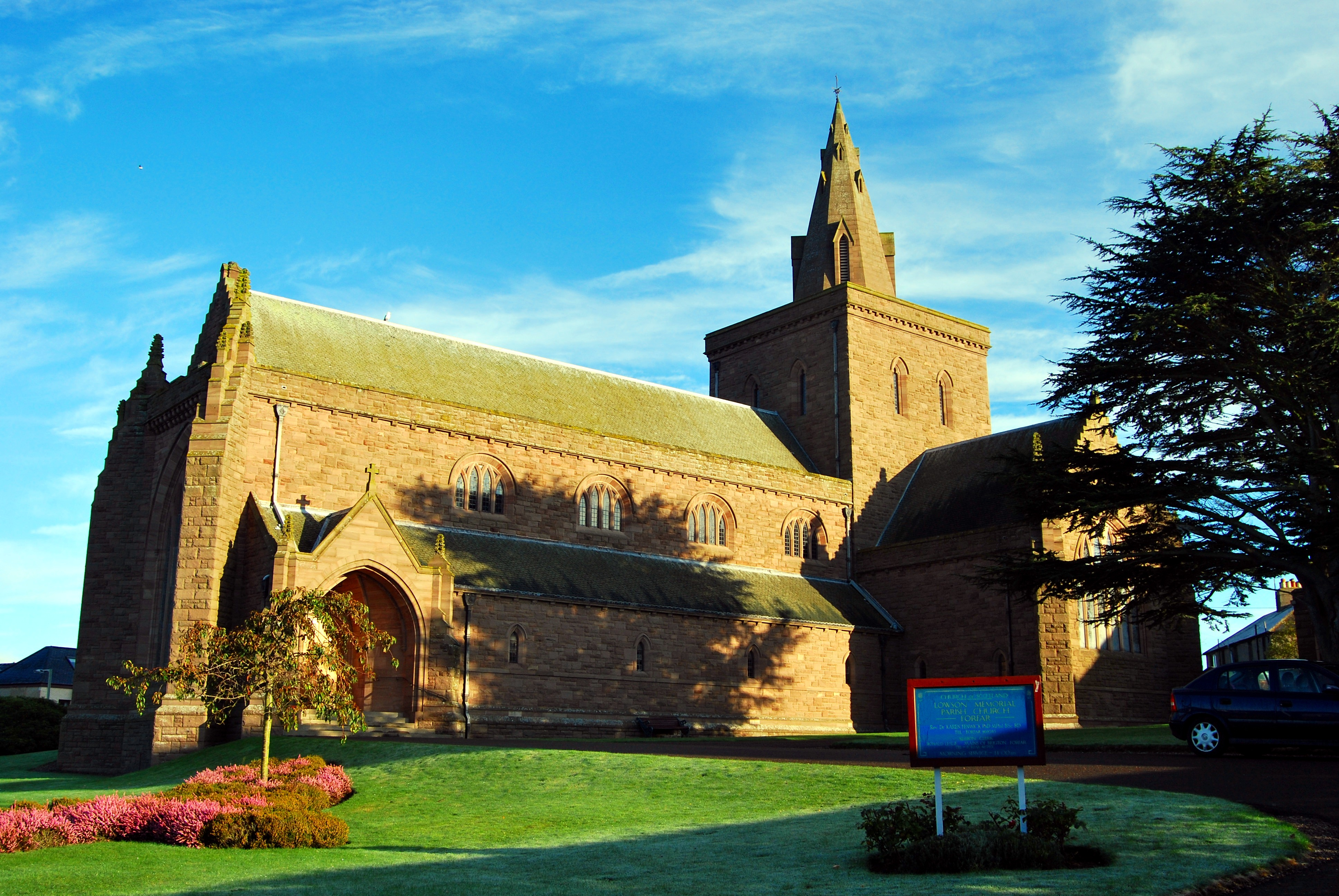
Lowson Memorial Church

Forfar has three Church of Scotland congregations:

- East and Old Church was originally the parish kirk, with a tall slender spire and steeple clock overlooking the town centre. It is a category B listed building and was refurbished in early 2017. The church is situated in the town centre and offers a mixture of traditional and contemporary worship.
- Lowson Memorial Church, off Montrose Road, is a category A listed church in late Scots Gothic style built in 1914 by A Marshall Mackenzie, who also designed Crathie Kirk. The church contains notable stained glass windows by Douglas Strachan. The church serves the east side of Forfar, and provides a mix of traditional and contemporary styles of worship.
- St Margaret's Church, in the West High Street, was originally a free kirk.

It had been decided (by a Church of Scotland arbiter) that the East and Old Parish Church would close, and the congregation would move to St. Margaret's Church. This was brought back for discussion at Angus Presbytery due to a large vote against this decision. Now the East and Old and St Margaret's are to remain individual churches as they have always have been.

The East & Old Church is built on the site of the original place of worship that some of the monks of Restenneth Priory built hundreds of years before the one today. The adjoining graveyard has famous 'residents' such as botanist George Don, quite a few scholars and a man who blamed the witches of Forfar for poisoning him after ill words were exchanged between them.

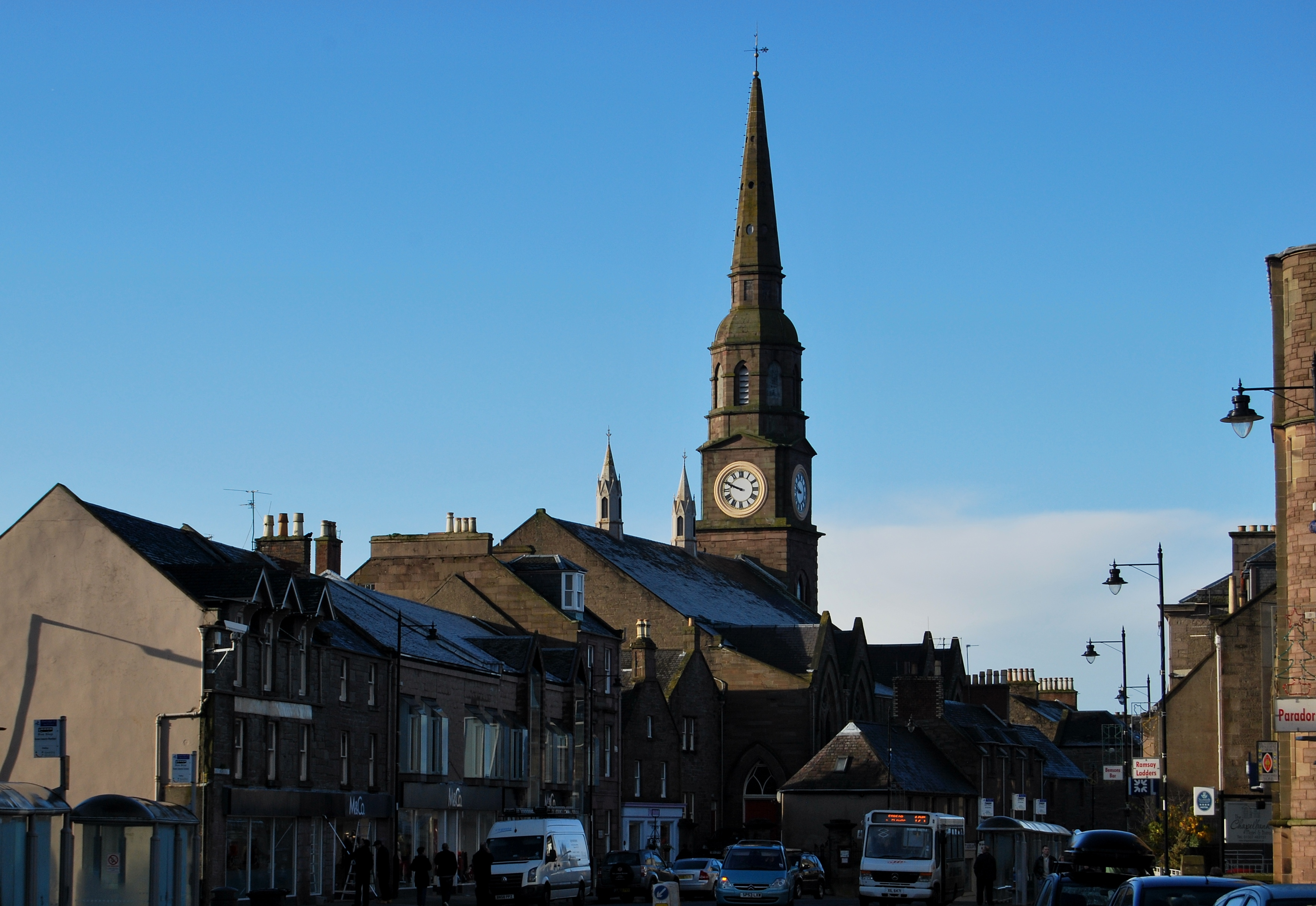
Forfar East and Old Parish Church

The steeple is a focal point of Forfar, visible when entering the town from any direction. Although abutting the East & Old building, it is owned by the 'Town' and is not formally part of the church property; it is all but certain to be retained following any disposal of the church building.

The town has churches of other denominations, including:

- St John the Evangelist Scottish Episcopal Church, East High Street, was designed by Sir R Rowand Anderson and consecrated in 1881. Elizabeth Bowes-Lyon, later to become Queen Elizabeth the Queen Mother, was confirmed in this church.
- St Fergus Roman Catholic Church
- Forfar Community Church at Wellbraehead on part of the old school site

There is a Kingdom Hall of Jehovah's witnesses.

== Other items of interest ==
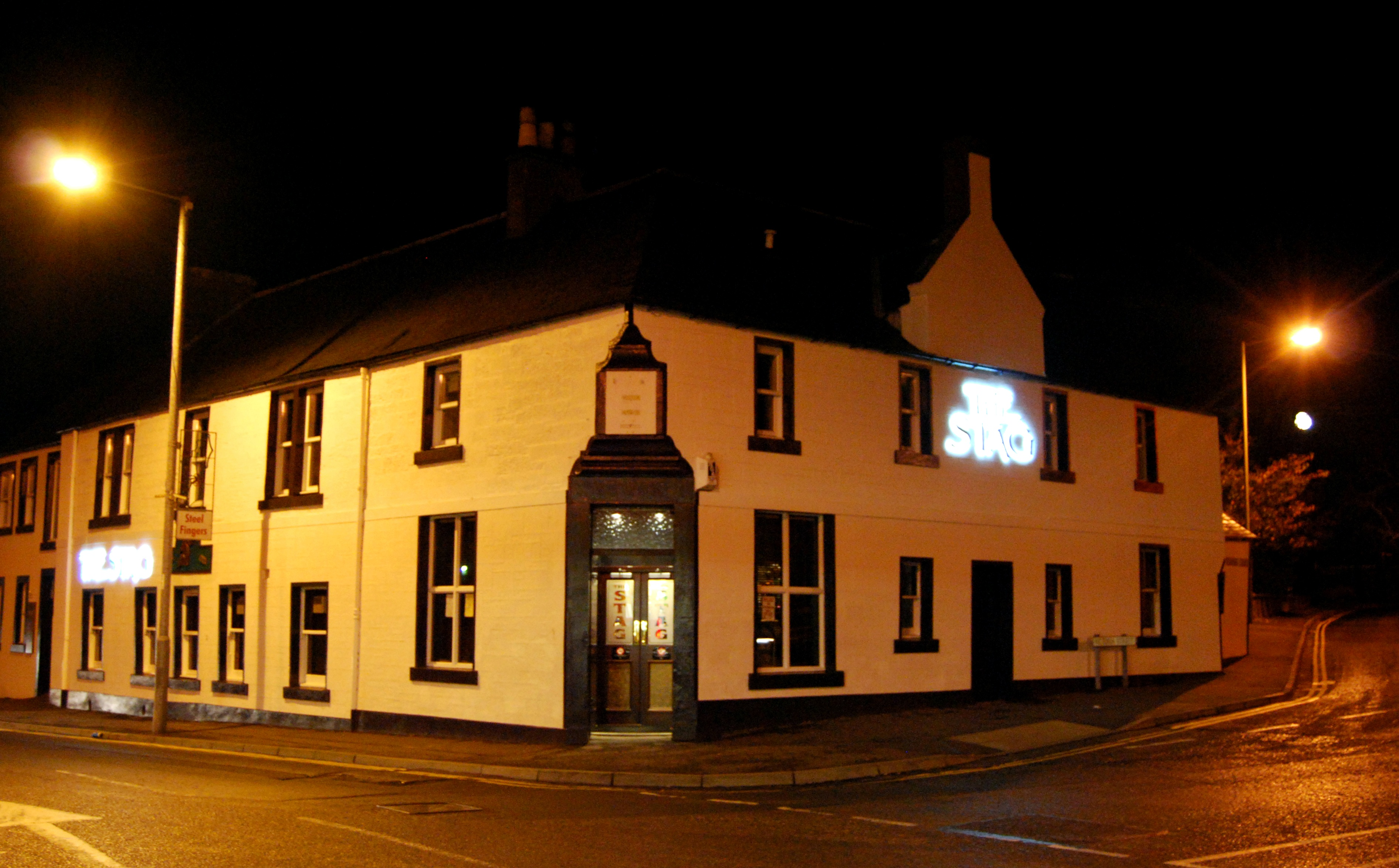
The Stag Forfar

The town is traditionally identified with the Forfar bridie, a meat pastry snack. A recipe for the Forfar bridie was featured in Maw Broon's Cookbook.

The Forfar Loch Country Park is visited by locals as a walking venue. It is said that the Forfar Loch extended over much more of Forfar in the 1800s, going as far up as Orchardbank and Wellbrae. A drainage project brought the water level down. In about the same time period the loch was used to dump raw sewage; this practice is no longer continued: it is now treated sewage.

The town holds many events throughout the year such as the bi-annual Forfar Mara-Fun, which raises money for charity, and the annual Forfar Food Festival, highlighting some of the local food. There is also a monthly farmers' market.

Forfar is home to the Strathmore Mineral Water Co., Ltd., a bottled mineral water producer now run by AG Barr. The company's products are shipped worldwide.

Forfar is known for the "coo o Forfar". A householder left a tub of beer in the doorway to cool, and a passing cow drank it. When the owner of the cow was charged for the beer, a baillie ruled that if the beer was drunk at the doorway it was "deoch an doras" or "stirrup cup", to charge for which would be an insult to Scots hospitality. This became a byword: "Be like the coo o Forfar, an tak a stannin drink".

== Public services ==
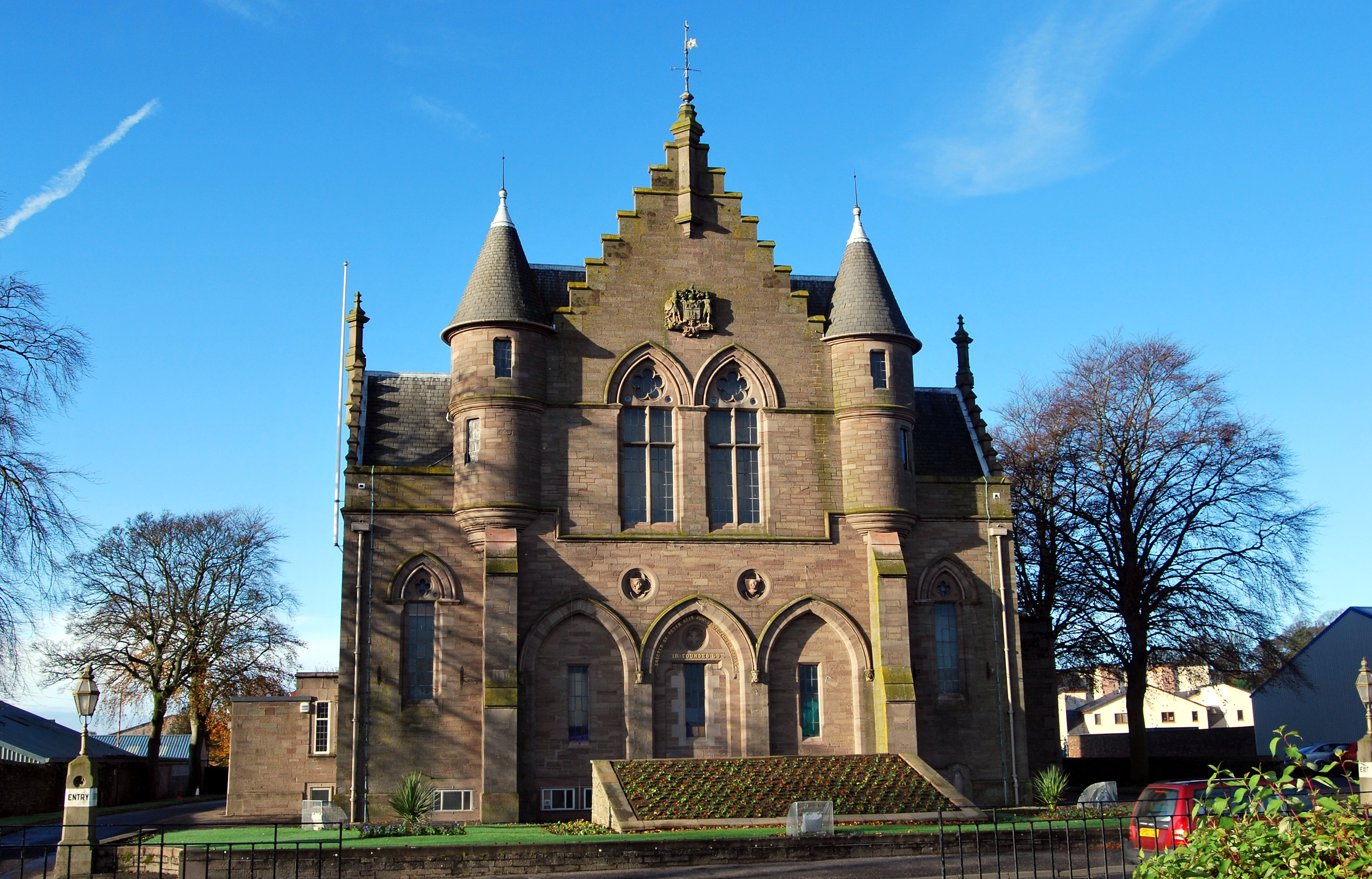
Forfar Reid Hall

Forfar and the surrounding area are supplied with water by Scottish Water from Lintrathen and Backwater reservoirs in Glen Isla. Electricity distribution is by Scottish Hydro Electric plc, part of the Scottish and Southern Energy group.

Waste management is handled by Angus Council. From June 2014, there has been a comprehensive recycling service in place, succeeding the more limited kerbside recycling scheme introduced in 2005. Recyclable waste (encompassing paper, card, cans, plastics and glass) is now collected fortnightly, on alternate weeks with non-recyclable waste, with households having separate bins for each purpose. Garden and food waste are also collected for separate processing. Roughly two-thirds of non-recyclable material is sent to landfill at Angus Council's site at Lochhead, Forfar, and the remainder sent for incineration (with energy recovery) outside the council area.

A recycling centre is located at Queenswell Road. Items accepted include, steel and aluminium cans, cardboard, paper, electrical equipment, engine oil, fridges and freezers, garden waste, gas bottles, glass, liquid food and drinks cartons, plastic bottles, plastic carrier bags, rubble, scrap metal, shoes and handbags, spectacles, textiles, tin foil, wood and yellow pages. Angus council publishes details of where and how each product is processed. There are also glass banks at the Abbeygate and Tesco car parks. The Angus Council area had a recycling rate of 34.7% in 2007/08.

Healthcare is supplied in the area by NHS Tayside. The nearest hospitals with accident and emergency departments are Arbroath Infirmary and Ninewells Hospital, Dundee. Primary Health Care in Forfar is supplied by several practices, based at Ravenswood Surgery on New Road, Academy Medical Centre in Academy Street and Lour Road Group Practice. Forfar, along with the rest of Scotland, is served by the Scottish Ambulance Service.

Since April 2013, law enforcement is provided by Police Scotland and Forfar is served by Scottish Fire and Rescue Service.

== Twin town ==
Forfar is twinned with:

- Chabanais, Charente, France.

== Notable people ==
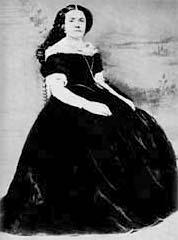
Eilley Bowers

- Patrick Abercromby (1656–1716), antiquarian and physician
- Eilley Bowers, in her time, one of the richest women in the United States, and owner of the Bowers Mansion, one of the then-largest houses in the western United States; a Scottish farmer's daughter who emigrated, after converting to the LDS Church as a teenager
- Willie Brown (1928–2017), footballer
- Peter Ritchie Calder (1906–1982), socialist writer, journalist, and academic
- James Cook, BBC journalist
- Caroline Doig (1938–2019), paediatric surgeon and the first woman elected to the council of the Royal College of Surgeons of Edinburgh
- David Don (1799–1841), botanist
- George Don (1798–1856), botanist
- George Duncan (1884–1965), Church of Scotland minister
- Prince Edward, Earl of Forfar. HRH visited the town in June 2019 after being granted the title in March of the same year. He was presented with an Earl of Forfar tartan
- Kathryn Findlay, architect
- James Simpson Fleming (1828–1899), banking lawyer
- David Ireland, colonel in the United States Army during American Civil War; commanded the 137th New York Infantry Regiment during crucial battles such as the Battle of Gettysburg; born in Forfar
- Reverend Dr John Ker, minister of Forfar 1745–1781, moderator in 1776
- George Langlands, footballer (primarily Dundee F.C.)
- Jack Lorimer, comedian and father of Max Wall
- David McLean (1890–1967), footballer, played for both Celtic and Rangers, ended his career at Forfar Athletic
- George McLean (1898–1970), footballer, younger brother of David, ended his career with Forfar Athletic
- A. S. Neill (1883–1973), educator
- David W. Potter, sports author
- Ian Read, CEO of Pfizer
- Enn Reitel, actor
- Bon Scott (1946-1980), rock n' roll singer from the band AC/DC
- David Taylor (1954–2014), former Joint General Secretary of UEFA and Chief Executive of the Scottish Football Association (SFA)
- Joseph Wedderburn (1882–1948), mathematician, modern algebra, born in Forfar

== Freedom of the Town ==
The following people and military units have received the Freedom of the Town of Forfar.

=== Individuals ===
- Queen Elizabeth the Queen Mother: 1956

=== Military units ===
- The Black Watch: 1956
