= Brechin High School =

Location
- Duke Street; Brechin, Angus, DD9 6LB; Scotland
- Coordinates: 56°44′13″N 2°40′16″W

Information
- Type: Comprehensive
- Motto: To Higher things
- Local authority: Angus Council
- Rector: Fiona Lawrence
- Age: 11 to 18
- Enrolment: ~600
- Houses: Dun, Farnell and Menmuir
- Colours: Scarlet, blue and gold
- Feeder schools: Andover, Edzell, Lethnot, Maisondieu, Stracathro and Tarfside
- Website: www.brechinhigh.angus.sch.uk

Brechin High School is a non-denominational secondary school located in Brechin, Angus, Scotland.

== Admissions ==
It has approximately 660 students. The school has a relationship with the town's cathedral stretching back to the early 15th century, with the formation of the choir school.

Feeder primary schools include two in Brechin: Andover and Maisondieu and four rural schools: Edzell, Lethnot, Stracathro (no.1), and Tarfside.

Historically, school pupils were split into four houses: Dalhousie, Maisondieu, Kinnaird and Trinity (named after local country estates) with siblings always being placed in the same house but this system was recently changed and pupils are now split between houses Dun, Farnell and Menmuir (named after local villages).

The school is in the north-west of Brechin, near the A90 bypass, and next to a disused railway line.

== People Educated at Brechin High School ==
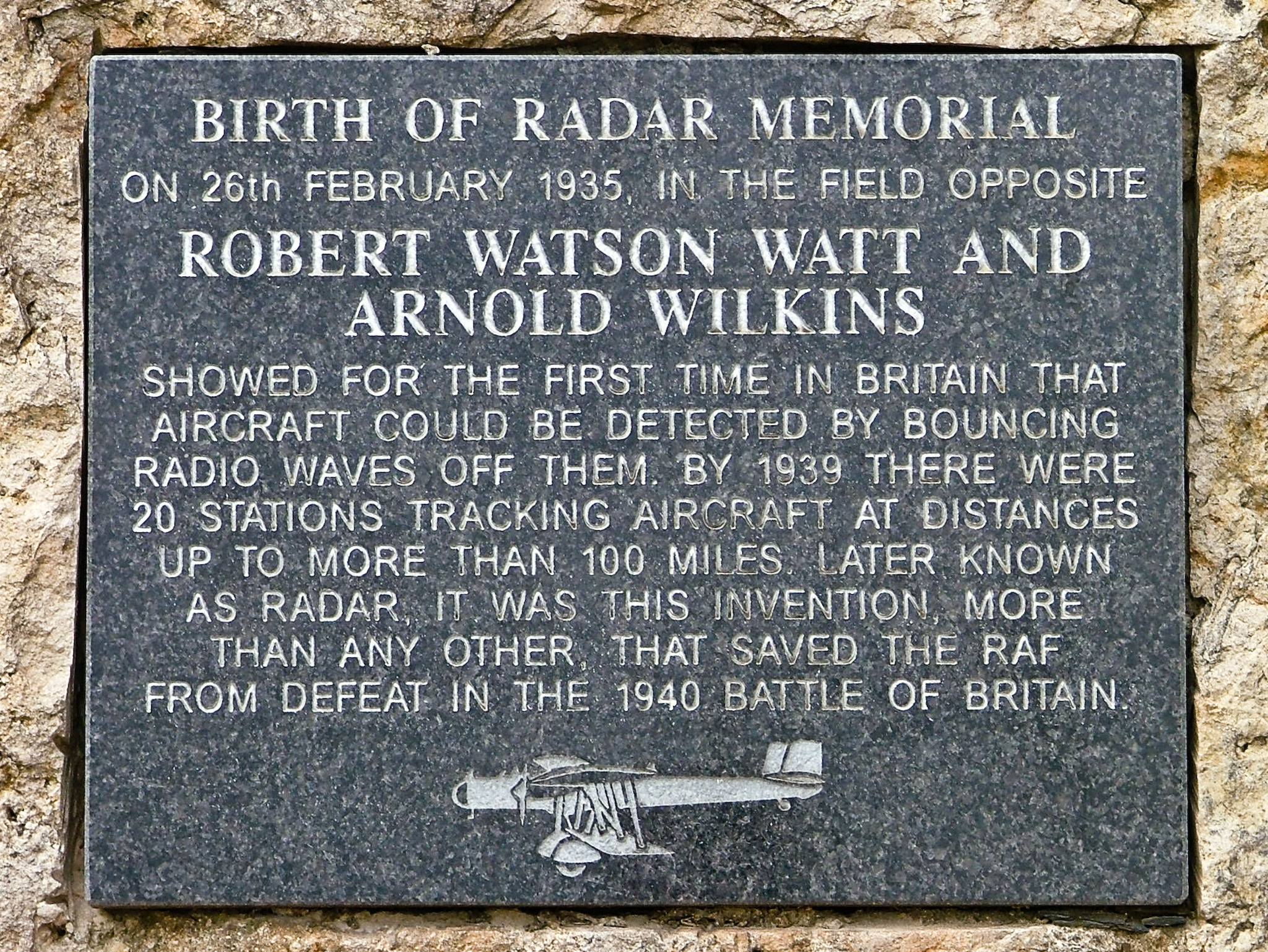
Watson-Watt memorial at Stowe Nine Churches in Northamptonshire for his Daventry Experiment in 1935 with Arnold Frederic Wilkins

- Dame Anne Begg MP, Labour Member of Parliament from 1997 to 2015 for Aberdeen South
- William Eddie, cricketer and Provost for the City and Royal Burgh of Brechin
- Christian Matlock, U.S. Bail Enforcement Agent 2000-2004 BBC Scotland The Scottish Bounty Hunter 2016
- John Gillies LLD FRS FRSE FSA, Historiographer Royal, 1793–1836
- Thomas Guthrie DD, founder of the Ragged Schools of Scotland and Moderator of the Free Church of Scotland, 1862
- William Guthrie, eighteenth-century historian and geographer
- Kirstene Hair, conservative member of Parliament from 2017 to 2019 for Angusf
- Joseph Fairweather Lamb FRSE, Chandos Professor of Physiology at the University of St Andrews
- David Low, Bishop of Ross and Argyll, 1819-1838 and Bishop of Moray, 1838–1850
- Alexander Ferrier Mitchell DD LLD, professor of ecclesiastical history at the University of St Andrews and Moderator of the Church of Scotland
- David Myles, Conservative member of Parliament from 1979 to 1983 for Banffshire
- Robin Orr CBE, composer, professor of music and founder chairman of Scottish Opera
- Sir Robert Watson-Watt KCB FRS FRAeS, inventor of radar
- David Will CBE, vice-president of FIFA, 1990–2007
- Stuart Wilson, cricketer

== See also ==
- List of the oldest schools in the United Kingdom
