= List of listed buildings in Brechin, Angus =

This is a list of listed buildings in the parish of Brechin in Angus, Scotland.

== List ==
Name	Location	Date Listed	Grid Ref. (Note: Sometimes known as OSGB36, the grid reference (where provided) is based on the British national grid reference system used by the Ordnance Survey. • "Guide to National Grid". Ordnance Survey. • "Get-a-map". Ordnance Survey.)	Geo-coordinates	Notes	LB Number (Note: Historic Environment Scotland assign a unique alphanumeric identifier to each designated site in Scotland, for listed buildings this always begins with "LB", for example "LB12345".)	Image
16, 18, 20 High Street				56°43′55″N 2°39′38″W	Category B	22492	Upload Photo
52, 54 High Street				56°43′51″N 2°39′34″W	Category B	22501	Upload Photo
68-74 High Street				56°43′51″N 2°39′33″W	Category A	22505	Upload Photo
13, 15 Panmure Street				56°43′59″N 2°39′29″W	Category C(S)	22519	Upload Photo
21, 23, 25 Panmure Street				56°44′00″N 2°39′27″W	Category C(S)	22521	Upload Photo
16 Panmure Street				56°43′58″N 2°39′28″W	Category C(S)	22526	Upload Photo
57-59 Park Road				56°43′58″N 2°38′56″W	Category C(S)	22534	Upload Photo
Park House 69-71 Park Road				56°43′58″N 2°38′47″W	Category C(S)	22535	Upload Photo
St Andrew's Episcopal Church Hall And Former Diocesan Library St Andrew Street				56°43′57″N 2°39′45″W	Category C(S)	22550	Upload Photo
1,3,5 St Mary Street				56°43′55″N 2°39′44″W	Category C(S)	22561	Upload Photo
6,7,8,9 St Ninian's Place				56°43′53″N 2°39′13″W	Category C(S)	22564	Upload Photo
Lyndhurst 1 St Ninian's Square				56°43′55″N 2°39′12″W	Category C(S)	22566	Upload Photo
3 (Roseneath) And 5 St Ninian's Square				56°43′56″N 2°39′12″W	Category C(S)	22567	Upload Photo
59 Southesk Street Kingdom Hall Of Jehovah's Witnesses				56°43′56″N 2°39′17″W	Category C(S)	22575	Upload Photo
1,3 Swan Street And 2,4 Market Street				56°43′57″N 2°39′36″W	Category B	22579	Upload Photo
14-20 Swan Street (Even Numbers)				56°43′56″N 2°39′34″W	Category C(S)	22585	Upload Photo
22,24,26,28 Swan Street				56°43′56″N 2°39′32″W	Category C(S)	22586	Upload Photo
Maisondieu Church, Witchden Road With Front Wall And Gatepiers				56°43′39″N 2°39′09″W	Category B	22588	Upload Photo
Manse Bishop's Close				56°43′52″N 2°39′36″W	Category B	22417	Upload Photo
21, 23 Castle Street				56°43′51″N 2°39′55″W	Category B	22426	Upload Photo
2 Castle Street				56°43′54″N 2°39′48″W	Category C(S)	22428	Upload Photo
4,6,8 Castle Street				56°43′54″N 2°39′48″W	Category B	22429	Upload Photo
Wall, Channonry Wynd				56°43′51″N 2°39′45″W	Category C(S)	22438	Upload Photo
Brechin Cathedral Graveyard Church Lane				56°43′51″N 2°39′42″W	Category B	22441	Upload Photo
11, 13, 15 Church Street				56°43′53″N 2°39′39″W	Category C(S)	22444	Upload Photo
29 Church Street				56°43′53″N 2°39′43″W	Category C(S)	22450	Upload Photo
35, 37 Church Street				56°43′53″N 2°39′44″W	Category C(S)	22451	Upload Photo
39 Church Street (The Rectory)				56°43′53″N 2°39′45″W	Category B	22452	Upload Photo
1B Clerk Street				56°43′58″N 2°39′33″W	Category C(S)	22461	Upload Photo
Auldbar Castle, Terracing And Gazebo On E. Side Of Den				56°42′40″N 2°41′46″W	Category B	5014	Upload Photo
Ardovie House, Old Farmhouse				56°41′50″N 2°40′00″W	Category C(S)	5019	Upload Photo
Arrat Mill Bothy				56°43′02″N 2°35′01″W	Category C(S)	5027	Upload Photo
Brechin Castle Detached Piers Of Forecourt				56°43′45″N 2°39′35″W	Category C(S)	5031	Upload Photo
Templewood House				56°45′22″N 2°38′19″W	Category B	5047	Upload Photo
Templewood Stables				56°45′23″N 2°38′16″W	Category B	5048	Upload Photo
Keithock, Main Gates				56°45′39″N 2°38′41″W	Category B	5052	Upload Photo
48, 50 High Street				56°43′52″N 2°39′35″W	Category C(S)	22500	Upload Photo
Maisondieu Lane House (Closed 1978) Adjoining Maisondieu Chapel On East				56°43′58″N 2°39′39″W	Category B	22509	Upload Photo
12, 14 Panmure Street				56°43′58″N 2°39′29″W	Category C(S)	22525	Upload Photo
30 Panmure Street				56°43′59″N 2°39′26″W	Category C(S)	22531	Upload Photo
4 Pearse Street				56°43′59″N 2°39′53″W	Category C(S)	22543	Upload Photo
18 Pearse Street				56°44′02″N 2°39′55″W	Category C(S)	22547	Upload Photo
12, 14 St David Street				56°43′56″N 2°39′39″W	Category C(S)	22555	Upload Photo
16, 18 St David Street				56°43′56″N 2°39′40″W	Category C(S)	22556	Upload Photo
1,2 St James Place				56°43′57″N 2°39′32″W	Category C(S)	22559	Upload Photo
3,4,5 St James Place				56°43′57″N 2°39′31″W	Category C(S)	22560	Upload Photo
Dalhousie Fountain St Ninian's Square				56°43′54″N 2°39′14″W	Category B	22569	Upload another image
57 Southesk Street				56°43′56″N 2°39′17″W	Category C(S)	22574	Upload Photo
19 Swan Street/1 Clerk Street Angus Steak House				56°43′57″N 2°39′34″W	Category C(S)	22582	Upload Photo
8-12 Swan Street (Even Numbers)				56°43′56″N 2°39′35″W	Category B	22584	Upload Photo
6 Airlie Street				56°43′58″N 2°39′53″W	Category B	22411	Upload Photo
Brechin Public Park Drinking Fountain				56°44′09″N 2°39′03″W	Category B	22420	Upload Photo
7 Castle Street				56°43′52″N 2°39′50″W	Category C(S)	22423	Upload Photo
13,15,17,19 Castle Street				56°43′51″N 2°39′54″W	Category C(S)	22425	Upload Photo
Garden House At Bearhill, 24 Castle Street				56°43′56″N 2°39′59″W	Category C(S)	22434	Upload Photo
Walls, Channonry Wynd				56°43′50″N 2°39′49″W	Category C(S)	22436	Upload Photo
Hall, Church Lane				56°43′52″N 2°39′40″W	Category C(S)	22442	Upload Photo
20, 22 Church Street				56°43′54″N 2°39′42″W	Category C(S)	22458	Upload Photo
East Mill, East Mill Road North Section Of Mill				56°43′31″N 2°38′34″W	Category B	22468	Upload Photo
39, 41 High Street				56°43′53″N 2°39′34″W	Category B	22479	Upload Photo
Kintrockat House				56°43′19″N 2°42′25″W	Category A	5011	Upload Photo
Ardovie House, Sundial				56°41′53″N 2°39′59″W	Category B	5017	Upload Photo
Arrat Mill, Old Cornmill				56°43′00″N 2°35′09″W	Category C(S)	5025	Upload Photo
Brechin Castle Icehouse (Now Blocked Up)				56°43′44″N 2°39′37″W	Category C(S)	5032	Upload Photo
Brechin Castle Fountain				56°43′37″N 2°40′01″W	Category C(S)	5037	Upload Photo
Little Keithock Dovecot				56°45′13″N 2°38′41″W	Category B	5054	Upload Photo
1 Channonry Wynd				56°43′51″N 2°39′45″W	Category C(S)	44202	Upload Photo
111, 113, 115 High Street				56°43′49″N 2°39′27″W	Category B	22489	Upload Photo
10, 12, 14 High Street				56°43′55″N 2°39′38″W	Category B	22491	Upload Photo
22, 24 High Street				56°43′54″N 2°39′37″W	Category B	22493	Upload Photo
26, 26A High Street				56°43′54″N 2°39′37″W	Category B	22494	Upload Photo
66 High Street				56°43′51″N 2°39′33″W	Category B	22504	Upload Photo
84 Market Street				56°44′04″N 2°39′38″W	Category C(S)	22512	Upload Photo
Den Burn Works Montrose Street And Southesk Street (Front Portions Only)				56°43′47″N 2°39′12″W	Category B	22513	Upload another image
Rosehill 15 North Latch Road				56°44′00″N 2°40′19″W	Category B	22514	Upload Photo
9, 11 Panmure Street				56°43′59″N 2°39′29″W	Category C(S)	22518	Upload Photo
19 Panmure Street				56°44′00″N 2°39′28″W	Category C(S)	22520	Upload Photo
Baptist Church (Formerly West And St Columba's Parish Church) And Halls, Panmure Street/Southesk Street				56°44′01″N 2°39′27″W	Category A	22522	Upload another image See more images
32, 34 Panmure Street				56°44′00″N 2°39′25″W	Category C(S)	22532	Upload Photo
Maisondieu Primary School St Andrew Street Original Part Only				56°44′00″N 2°39′43″W	Category C(S)	22552	Upload Photo
1,2,3,4,5 St Ninian's Place Southesk Street				56°43′53″N 2°39′14″W	Category C(S)	22563	Upload Photo
Gardner Memorial Church, St Ninian's Square And Damacre Road Including Church Halls And Vestries				56°43′54″N 2°39′16″W	Category A	22568	Upload another image
Bridge To Cemetery Off Southesk Street				56°44′02″N 2°39′23″W	Category B	22576	Upload Photo
Gateway To Cemetery Off Southesk Street				56°44′02″N 2°39′21″W	Category B	22577	Upload Photo
7,9,11,13 Swan Street City Hall Buildings				56°43′57″N 2°39′35″W	Category C(S)	22581	Upload Photo
A Christie's Premises (Former Drill Hall) Bank Street				56°43′57″N 2°39′23″W	Category C(S)	22414	Upload Photo
Brechin Public Park Bandstand				56°44′10″N 2°39′04″W	Category B	22419	Upload Photo
Lodge, Entrance Gateway And Flanking Walls To Brechin Castle 25 Castle Street At St Michael's Mount				56°43′50″N 2°40′00″W	Category B	22427	Upload Photo
5, 7, 9 Church Street				56°43′53″N 2°39′38″W	Category B	22443	Upload Photo
19, 21 Church Street And 1 Church Lane				56°43′53″N 2°39′40″W	Category B	22446	Upload another image
23 Church Street And Wall Church Lane				56°43′53″N 2°39′41″W	Category B	22447	Upload Photo
3 Clerk Street				56°43′59″N 2°39′34″W	Category C(S)	22462	Upload Photo
Jolly's Hotel 14 Clerk Street				56°44′00″N 2°39′33″W	Category C(S)	22464	Upload Photo
Gatepiers At Springfield Cookston Road				56°44′15″N 2°39′46″W	Category C(S)	22467	Upload Photo
7, 9 High Street				56°43′55″N 2°39′36″W	Category B	22472	Upload Photo
17, 19 High Street				56°43′54″N 2°39′36″W	Category B	22474	Upload Photo
43, 45 High Street				56°43′53″N 2°39′34″W	Category B	22480	Upload Photo
Auldbar School And Gates To Auldbar Castle				56°42′22″N 2°41′40″W	Category B	5015	Upload another image
Ardovie House				56°41′54″N 2°39′57″W	Category A	5016	Upload Photo
Arrat Mill House				56°43′00″N 2°35′02″W	Category C(S)	5026	Upload Photo
Railway Overbridge Near Windyedge Farm				56°43′24″N 2°36′16″W	Category C(S)	5028	Upload another image
Brechin Castle Old Lodge				56°43′48″N 2°40′07″W	Category B	5034	Upload another image
Brechin Castle Walled Garden				56°43′36″N 2°40′04″W	Category B	5036	Upload another image
Brechin Castle Old Sundial				56°43′36″N 2°40′04″W	Category B	5038	Upload Photo
Dalgety Farmhouse				56°43′22″N 2°38′20″W	Category B	5044	Upload Photo
Ornamental Bridge Over Keithock Burn, N. Of Packbridge				56°45′41″N 2°39′09″W	Category C(S)	5051	Upload Photo
Keithock House Stables, Farmhouse And Steading				56°45′42″N 2°39′07″W	Category B	5055	Upload Photo
109 High Street				56°43′49″N 2°39′27″W	Category C(S)	22488	Upload Photo
38, 40 High Street				56°43′53″N 2°39′36″W	Category B	22497	Upload Photo
46 High Street				56°43′52″N 2°39′35″W	Category B	22499	Upload Photo
62 High Street				56°43′51″N 2°39′33″W	Category C(S)	22503	Upload Photo
76, 78 High Street				56°43′50″N 2°39′32″W	Category C(S)	22506	Upload Photo
Glencairn Infirmary Street				56°43′58″N 2°39′11″W	Category C(S)	22507	Upload Photo
Maison Dieu Chapel Maisondieu Lane				56°43′59″N 2°39′39″W	Category A	22508	Upload another image See more images
Dalhousie Hotel 1, 3 Market Street And 2, 4, 6 St David Street				56°43′56″N 2°39′38″W	Category B	22510	Upload Photo
82 Market Street				56°44′02″N 2°39′38″W	Category B	22511	Upload Photo
Railway Station, Including Former Goods Depot, Park Road				56°43′54″N 2°39′10″W	Category B	22536	Upload another image
4 Park Road				56°43′56″N 2°39′05″W	Category C(S)	22537	Upload Photo
1 Pearse Street/8 Airlie Street				56°43′58″N 2°39′55″W	Category C(S)	22541	Upload Photo
6 Pearse Street				56°44′00″N 2°39′53″W	Category C(S)	22544	Upload Photo
Brechin Bridge Over River South Esk Off River Street				56°43′24″N 2°38′53″W	Category A	22549	Upload another image
7 St Mary Street				56°43′54″N 2°39′44″W	Category C(S)	22562	Upload Photo
Sundial St Ninian's Square				56°43′56″N 2°39′15″W	Category C(S)	22571	Upload Photo
Former Church Of St Ninian (Now Roman Catholic Church) Bank Street				56°43′56″N 2°39′21″W	Category B	22413	Upload Photo
Jehovah's Witnesses' Hall (Former East R C School) Bank Street				56°43′57″N 2°39′24″W	Category C(S)	22415	Upload Photo
32, 34 Bank Street Town Clerk's And Police Offices				56°43′59″N 2°39′24″W	Category B	22416	Upload Photo
1 Castle Street				56°43′53″N 2°39′47″W	Category C(S)	22421	Upload Photo
9 Castle Street (Including Garden Wall And Gateway)				56°43′52″N 2°39′52″W	Category C(S)	22424	Upload Photo
Bearhill Lodge 22 Castle Street				56°43′51″N 2°39′59″W	Category B	22432	Upload Photo
5 Channonry Wynd				56°43′50″N 2°39′47″W	Category C(S)	22435	Upload Photo
Round Tower At South West Angle Of Cathedral Church Lane				56°43′51″N 2°39′41″W	Category A	22440	Upload another image See more images
Brechin Mechanics' Institute, Church Street And St Mary Street				56°43′54″N 2°39′45″W	Category B	22459	Upload Photo
1, 3 High Street And 2, 4 Swan Street				56°43′56″N 2°39′37″W	Category B	22470	Upload Photo
11, 13 High Street				56°43′55″N 2°39′36″W	Category B	22473	Upload Photo
33, 35, 37 High Street				56°43′53″N 2°39′35″W	Category B	22478	Upload Photo
Wardend Of Keithock				56°46′02″N 2°38′41″W	Category B	5006	Upload Photo
Murlingden House West Gates And Lodge				56°45′07″N 2°40′16″W	Category C(S)	5010	Upload Photo
Ardovie House, Walled Garden				56°41′53″N 2°40′00″W	Category C(S)	5018	Upload Photo
Temple Near Bank Of South Esk, Kinnaird				56°42′54″N 2°37′06″W	Category B	5021	Upload Photo
Balbirnie Mills				56°43′00″N 2°36′10″W	Category B	5022	Upload another image
Arrat, Farmhouse				56°43′12″N 2°35′32″W	Category C(S)	5024	Upload Photo
Brechin Castle Detached Columns				56°43′44″N 2°39′37″W	Category C(S)	5040	Upload Photo
Stannochy Bridge				56°43′19″N 2°40′54″W	Category A	5042	Upload another image
East Tollhouse, Montrose Road, Brechin				56°43′39″N 2°38′21″W	Category C(S)	5045	Upload Photo
Leuchland Farmhouse				56°43′42″N 2°37′04″W	Category B	94	Upload Photo
91-93 High Street				56°43′50″N 2°39′29″W	Category C(S)	22486	Upload Photo
Andover (Originally Tenements) School, Nursery Lane				56°43′39″N 2°39′03″W	Category B	22517	Upload Photo
18, 20 Panmure Street				56°43′58″N 2°39′28″W	Category C(S)	22527	Upload Photo
28 Panmure Street				56°43′59″N 2°39′26″W	Category B	22530	Upload Photo
7, 9, 11, 13 Park Road				56°43′54″N 2°39′12″W	Category C(S)	22533	Upload Photo
Lodge At Viewbank Park Road				56°43′56″N 2°38′41″W	Category C(S)	22540	Upload Photo
Pearse Croft 8 Pearse Street				56°44′00″N 2°39′54″W	Category C(S)	22545	Upload Photo
St Andrew's Episcopal Church, Argyll Street And St Andrew Street				56°44′00″N 2°39′46″W	Category B	22551	Upload Photo
22 St David Street				56°43′56″N 2°39′40″W	Category C(S)	22557	Upload Photo
Lodge At Cemetery Off Southesk Street				56°44′02″N 2°39′21″W	Category C(S)	22578	Upload Photo
2 Airlie Street				56°43′56″N 2°39′45″W	Category C(S)	22409	Upload Photo
Balgownie 4 Airlie Street/1 Argyle Street				56°43′57″N 2°39′49″W	Category C(S)	22410	Upload Photo
The Mary Acre 11 Argyle Street				56°44′02″N 2°39′53″W	Category B	22412	Upload Photo
Offices At 18 Castle Street				56°43′53″N 2°39′54″W	Category C(S)	22431	Upload Photo
4 Church Street				56°43′54″N 2°39′38″W	Category C(S)	22455	Upload Photo
Exchange Bar 8 Church Street				56°43′54″N 2°39′38″W	Category C(S)	22456	Upload Photo
18 Church Street				56°43′54″N 2°39′41″W	Category C(S)	22457	Upload Photo
51, 53, 55 High Street				56°43′52″N 2°39′33″W	Category C(S)	22482	Upload Photo
57 High Street				56°43′52″N 2°39′33″W	Category C(S)	22483	Upload Photo
North Lodge, Kinnaird				56°43′04″N 2°37′42″W	Category B	5020	Upload Photo
Brechin Castle Image Bridge Over River South Esk				56°43′38″N 2°39′40″W	Category B	5035	Upload Photo
Brechin Castle New Sundial				56°43′36″N 2°40′08″W	Category C(S)	5039	Upload Photo
Brechin Castle Avenue Old Gate Piers				56°43′48″N 2°40′07″W	Category B	5041	Upload Photo
Keithock House, Laundry				56°45′40″N 2°39′04″W	Category C(S)	5056	Upload Photo
4, 6, 8 High Street				56°43′55″N 2°39′38″W	Category C(S)	22490	Upload Photo
Old Town Hall 28 High Street And 2 Church Street				56°43′54″N 2°39′37″W	Category B	22495	Upload another image
42, 44 High Street				56°43′52″N 2°39′35″W	Category B	22498	Upload Photo
Lodge At Rosehill 15 North Latch Road				56°44′01″N 2°40′20″W	Category C(S)	22515	Upload Photo
8, 10 Panmure Street And 2,4,6 Martin's Lane				56°43′58″N 2°39′30″W	Category C(S)	22524	Upload Photo
Viewbank, Park Road				56°43′55″N 2°38′37″W	Category B	22538	Upload Photo
Haybarn At Viewbank Park Road				56°43′57″N 2°38′38″W	Category C(S)	22539	Upload Photo
Grove House, 22 St Andrew Street				56°44′04″N 2°39′43″W	Category C(S)	22553	Upload Photo
24,26,28 St David Street				56°43′56″N 2°39′41″W	Category C(S)	22558	Upload Photo
10,11,12,13 St Ninian's Place				56°43′53″N 2°39′13″W	Category C(S)	22565	Upload Photo
Public Library St Ninian's Square				56°43′57″N 2°39′14″W	Category B	22570	Upload another image See more images
5 Swan Street				56°43′57″N 2°39′36″W	Category B	22580	Upload Photo
Vanes Park Airlie Street				56°43′59″N 2°40′07″W	Category C(S)	22408	Upload Photo
Brechin Cathedral Church Lane				56°43′51″N 2°39′41″W	Category A	22439	Upload another image
27 Church Street				56°43′53″N 2°39′42″W	Category C(S)	22449	Upload Photo
41 Church Street				56°43′53″N 2°39′46″W	Category B	22453	Upload Photo
Northern Hotel 2, 4 Clerk Street And 1, 3, 5, 7 Panmure Street				56°43′59″N 2°39′32″W	Category B	22463	Upload Photo
5 High Street				56°43′55″N 2°39′36″W	Category B	22471	Upload Photo
49 High Street, Former Co-Operative Building				56°43′52″N 2°39′34″W	Category C(S)	22481	Upload Photo
Balbirniemills House And Adjoining Cottage				56°43′01″N 2°36′13″W	Category C(S)	5023	Upload Photo
Brechin Castle				56°43′44″N 2°39′32″W	Category A	5030	Upload another image
Burghill, Farmhouse				56°43′16″N 2°39′40″W	Category B	5043	Upload Photo
Little Keithock Bridge Over Keithock Burn				56°45′12″N 2°38′41″W	Category C(S)	5049	Upload Photo
Old Pack Bridge Over Keithock Burn Between Little Keithock And Keithock House				56°45′28″N 2°39′03″W	Category B	5050	Upload Photo
97, 99 High Street				56°43′49″N 2°39′29″W	Category C(S)	22487	Upload Photo
30 High Street				56°43′53″N 2°39′37″W	Category C(S)	22496	Upload Photo
56, 58, 60 High Street				56°43′51″N 2°39′34″W	Category C(S)	22502	Upload Photo
4, 6 Panmure Street Clydesdale Bank				56°43′57″N 2°39′30″W	Category C(S)	22523	Upload Photo
22, 24 Panmure Street				56°43′59″N 2°39′28″W	Category C(S)	22528	Upload Photo
20 Pearse Street				56°44′03″N 2°39′55″W	Category C(S)	22548	Upload Photo
51 Southesk Street				56°43′55″N 2°39′17″W	Category C(S)	22572	Upload Photo
55 Southesk Street				56°43′56″N 2°39′17″W	Category C(S)	22573	Upload Photo
Glencadam House Off Trinity Road				56°44′17″N 2°39′10″W	Category B	22587	Upload Photo
City Royal Bar 26 City Road				56°43′50″N 2°39′24″W	Category C(S)	22460	Upload Photo
22, 24 Clerk Street Post Office				56°44′01″N 2°39′33″W	Category C(S)	22465	Upload Photo
East Mill, East Mill Road South Section Of Mill				56°43′31″N 2°38′34″W	Category C(S)	22469	Upload Photo
29, 31 High Street				56°43′54″N 2°39′35″W	Category B	22477	Upload Photo
Railway Under-Bridge Near Leuchland				56°43′36″N 2°37′31″W	Category C(S)	5046	Upload Photo
Gatepiers At Rosehill 15 North Latch Road				56°43′59″N 2°40′02″W	Category C(S)	22516	Upload Photo
26 Panmure Street				56°43′59″N 2°39′27″W	Category C(S)	22529	Upload Photo
Pearsemount, 3 Pearse Street				56°44′00″N 2°39′56″W	Category B	22542	Upload Photo
16 Pearce Street				56°44′01″N 2°39′54″W	Category C(S)	22546	Upload Photo
Townhead Primary School St Andrew Street				56°44′05″N 2°39′44″W	Category C(S)	22554	Upload Photo
6 Swan Street				56°43′56″N 2°39′36″W	Category C(S)	22583	Upload Photo
Manse Offices Bishop's Close				56°43′52″N 2°39′39″W	Category C(S)	22418	Upload Photo
5 Castle Street				56°43′52″N 2°39′50″W	Category C(S)	22422	Upload Photo
18 Castle Street				56°43′53″N 2°39′54″W	Category C(S)	22430	Upload Photo
Bearhill 24 Castle Street				56°43′54″N 2°39′57″W	Category B	22433	Upload Photo
Shed-Garage Channonry Wynd				56°43′50″N 2°39′49″W	Category C(S)	22437	Upload Photo
'Castle View' 17 Church Street				56°43′53″N 2°39′39″W	Category B	22445	Upload Photo
25 Church Street And Wall Church Lane				56°43′53″N 2°39′42″W	Category B	22448	Upload Photo
Springfield Cookston Road				56°44′14″N 2°39′50″W	Category B	22466	Upload Photo
21, 23 High Street				56°43′54″N 2°39′36″W	Category C(S)	22475	Upload Photo
25, 27 High Street				56°43′54″N 2°39′35″W	Category A	22476	Upload Photo
61, 61A High Street				56°43′52″N 2°39′32″W	Category B	22484	Upload Photo
85, 87 High Street				56°43′50″N 2°39′29″W	Category C(S)	22485	Upload Photo
Murlingden House				56°45′16″N 2°40′13″W	Category B	5007	Upload Photo
St. Ann's				56°43′42″N 2°42′29″W	Category B	5008	Upload Photo
Murlingden House Main Gates				56°45′06″N 2°40′16″W	Category C(S)	5009	Upload Photo
Kintrockat Lodge And Gates				56°43′39″N 2°42′14″W	Category C(S)	5012	Upload Photo
Auldbar Castle. Bridge At Junction Of East Lodge And School Drives				56°43′02″N 2°41′25″W	Category C(S)	5013	Upload Photo
Brechin Reservoir Commemorative Pedestal				56°44′52″N 2°38′55″W	Category B	5029	Upload Photo
Brechin Castle Stableblock				56°43′48″N 2°39′39″W	Category B	5033	Upload Photo
Keithock House				56°45′38″N 2°39′00″W	Category B	5053	Upload Photo
Keithock House, Bridge Over Keithock Burn				56°45′36″N 2°39′02″W	Category B	5005	Upload Photo
Mains Of Ardovie, Farmhouse				56°41′46″N 2°40′35″W	Category B	93	Upload Photo

== Key ==
The scheme for classifying buildings in Scotland is:

- Category A: "buildings of national or international importance, either architectural or historic; or fine, little-altered examples of some particular period, style or building type."
- Category B: "buildings of regional or more than local importance; or major examples of some particular period, style or building type, which may have been altered."
- Category C: "buildings of local importance; lesser examples of any period, style, or building type, as originally constructed or moderately altered; and simple traditional buildings which group well with other listed buildings."

In March 2016 there were 47,288 listed buildings in Scotland. Of these, 8% were Category A, and 50% were Category B, with the remaining 42% being Category C.

== See also ==
- List of listed buildings in Angus
