= John Reid (physiologist) =

Scottish physician and academic

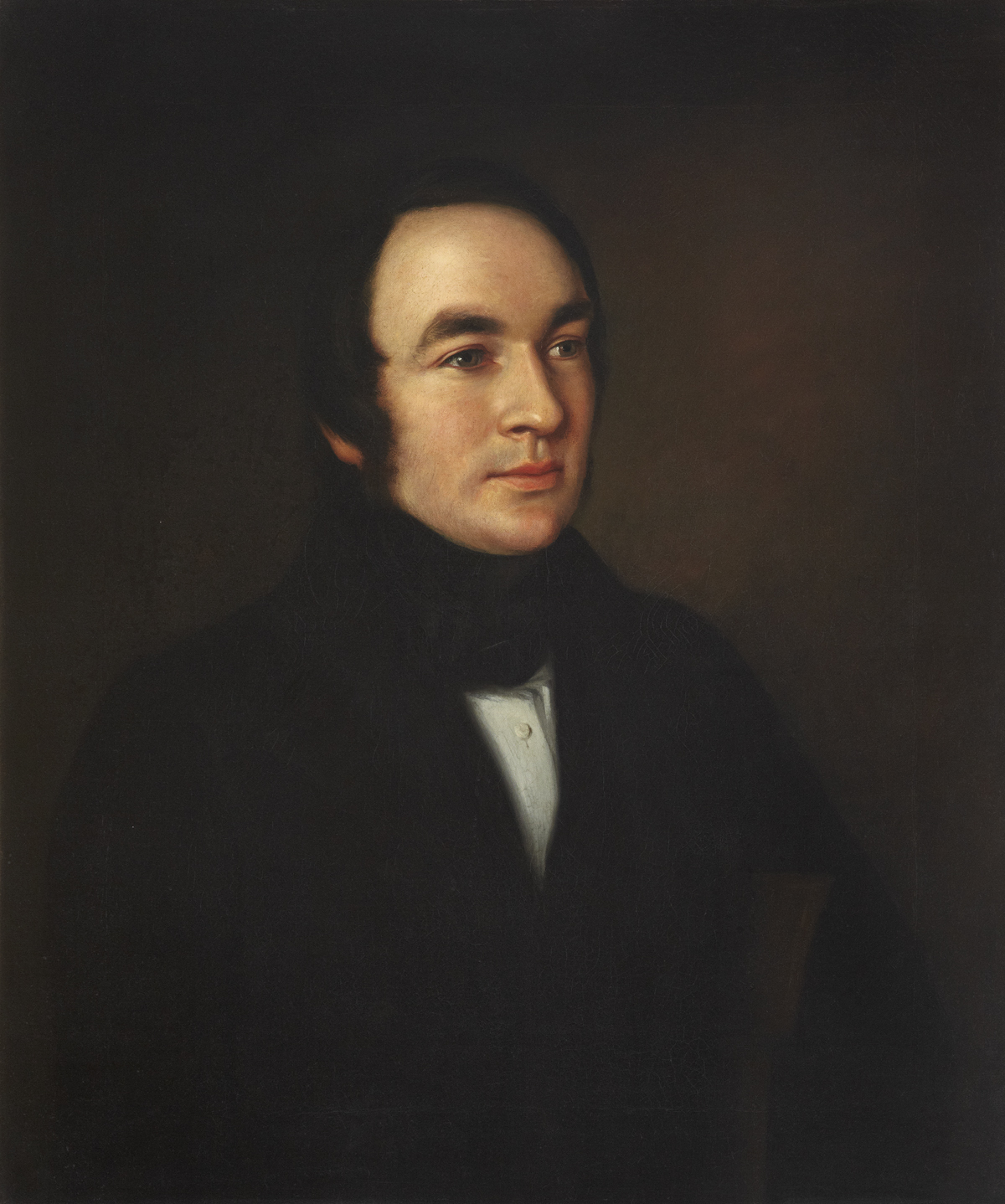
John Reid

John Reid (9 April 1809 – 30 July 1849) was a Scottish medical doctor and academic, known as an anatomist and physiologist.

== Life ==
The sixth child of Henry Reid, a farmer, he was born at Bathgate in West Lothian, on 9 April 1809. He studied medicine at the University of Edinburgh, taking his diploma on 12 July 1830, and being admitted a fellow of the Royal College of Physicians, Edinburgh, on 4 October 1836.

Reid was appointed assistant physician in the clinical wards of Edinburgh Infirmary in 1830, and in 1831 went to Paris to study. Returning in 1832, he was sent, with three other Edinburgh physicians, to Dumfries during the outbreak of cholera there, remaining for several months there.

He lived nearby at 8 Hill Place.

Reid described the function of the glossopharyngeal nerve and vagus nerve. He also proved the heart had a double innervation through the vagus and sympathetic nerves.

Reid subsequently became a demonstrator in the school of anatomy established at Old Surgeons' Hall, Edinburgh, and published medical essays. In 1836 he was appointed lecturer on physiology at the Edinburgh Extra-Academical Medical School, and in 1838 pathologist to the Royal Infirmary, Edinburgh. On the death of Dr. Robert Briggs in 1841, Reid was appointed to the Chandos chair of anatomy in the University of St Andrews. There he began a course of lectures on comparative anatomy and physiology, in addition to the regular work of the professorship. He also conducted research into marine fauna of the Fife coast, and in 1848 published a collection of papers on the subject, entitled Physiological, Anatomical, and Pathological Researches.

After a long illness, Reid died from cancer of the tongue in 1849.

== Notes ==
Attribution

This article incorporates text from a publication now in the public domain: Lee, Sidney, ed. (1896). "Reid, John (1809-1849)". Dictionary of National Biography. Vol. 47. London: Smith, Elder & Co.
