= Pyramids (Bathgate) =

Land sculpture in West Lothian, Scotland

Coordinates: 55°53′28″N 3°36′17″W

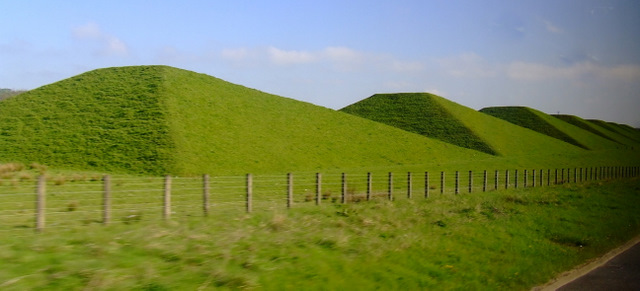
Pyramids land sculptures on the M8 at Bathgate

The Pyramids are a land sculpture alongside the M8 motorway at Bathgate.

Originally named the "Sawtooth Ramps", it was sponsored by Motorola and formed part of the M8 Art Project. The sculpture was created by artist Patricia Leighton in 1993. It is 1,000 feet (300 m) long and consists of seven 36-foot (11 m) high ramps made of earth and seeded with grass. The artist based the design on local geographic features (drumlins) and the shape of the surrounding bings. Sheep are grazed on the structure which keeps the grass short. The pyramidal shape of the sculpture gave rise to the name of the nearby Pyramids Business Park.

== Coloured sheep ==
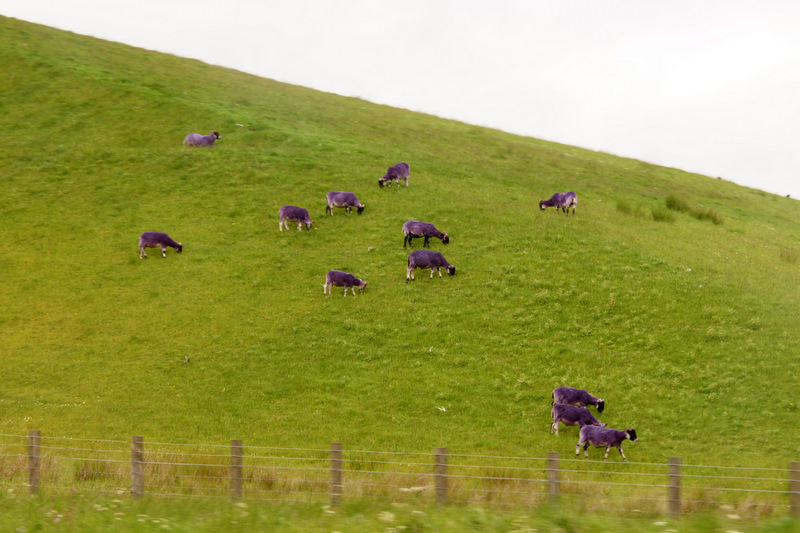
Purple sheep on the Pyramids at Bathgate

In April 2007, a local farmer painted the sheep which graze on the grass mounds bright red with a harmless sheep spray. Over the years the sheep have been painted different colours to raise awareness of charities: pink for Breast Cancer Research, and purple for World Autism Awareness Month by Scottish Autism in April 2015.

== Giant poppies ==
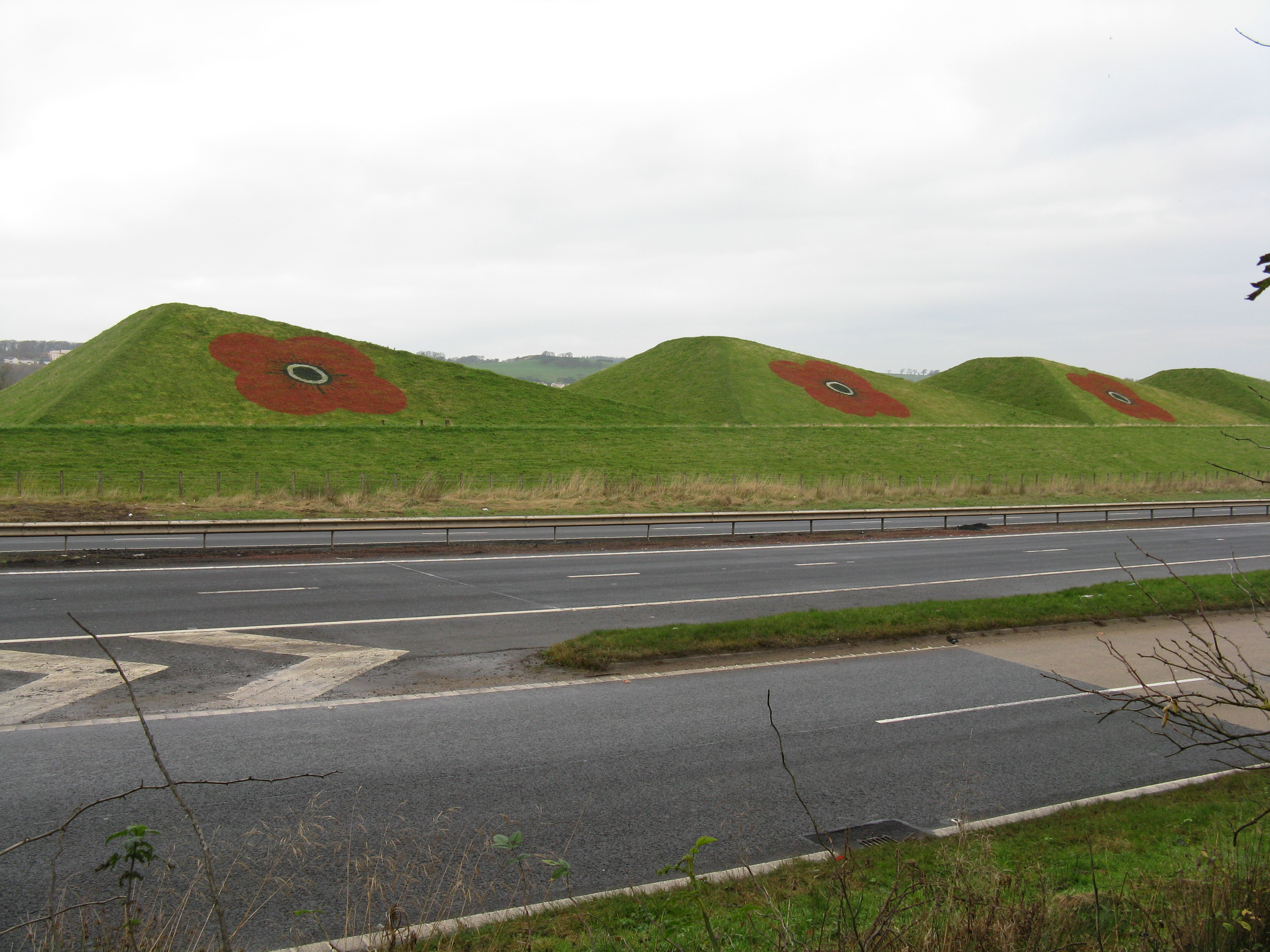
Red poppies on the Pyramids at Bathgate

Giant poppies have been painted on the grass ramps in November for a number of years. This is organised by Poppyscotland as part of the Remembrance Day commemorations and fund-raising.

In 2015, the nationalist political group Siol nan Gaidheal painted their white poppy logo on one of the ramps, which was condemned as vandalism and a political stunt by Angela Constance, a local MSP.
