= Joseph Fairweather Lamb =

Scottish physician

Joseph Fairweather Lamb FRSE (1928–2015) was a 20th-century Scottish physician, who was emeritus Professor of the Chandos Chair of Physiology at the University of St Andrews.

== Life ==
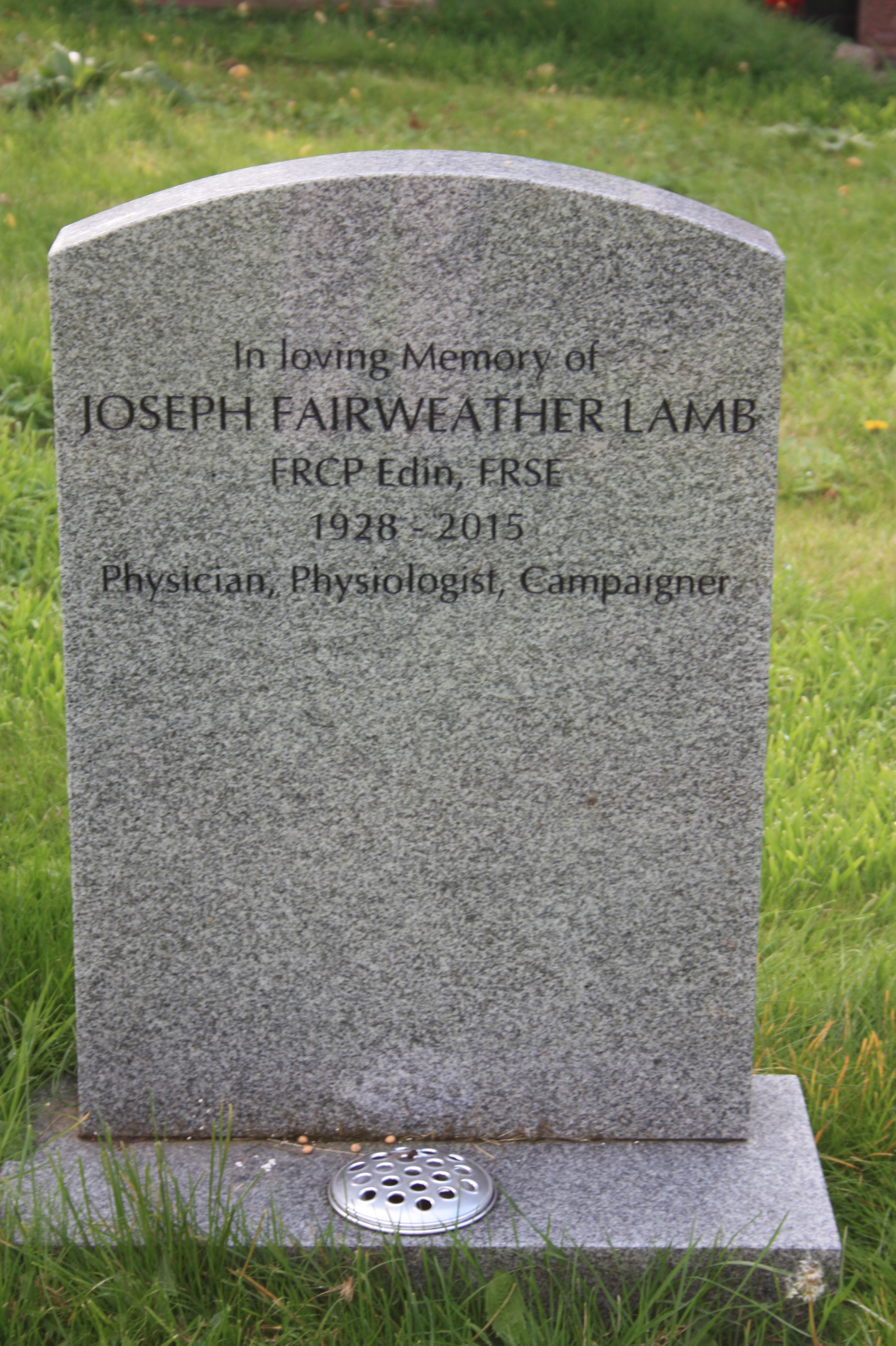
The grave of Joseph Fairweather Lamb, Dean Cemetery, Edinburgh

He was born at Balnacake Farm near Brechin on 18 July 1928 the son of Joseph Lamb, a tenant farmer, and his wife, Agnes Fairweather.

He was educated at Aldbar School then Brechin High School. He then studied medicine at University of Edinburgh, graduating MB ChB. After a spell as a physician he returned to university to obtain a PhD then took lectureships at the University of Edinburgh and the University of Glasgow.

In 1969 he was appointed to the Chandos Chair of Physiology at the University of St Andrews and held the post for 24 years until 1993. From 1998 until 2003 he led the Rowett Research Institute at the University of Aberdeen.

He was elected as a Fellow of the Royal Society of Edinburgh in 1986.

He died peacefully in Edinburgh's Western General Hospital on 18 September 2015. He is buried in the modern northern extension to Dean Cemetery in western Edinburgh. The grave lies to the north-west.

== Family ==
He was married twice: firstly to Olivia Horne and following divorce to Bridget Cook. He had three children by the first marriage and two by the second.

== Publications ==
- Essentials of Physiology (1991)
