= Brechin =

Town in Angus, Scotland

Coordinates: 56.72994°N 2.65533°W

Brechin: Scottish Gaelic: Breichinn; Scots: Brechin
- Market town and former Royal burgh
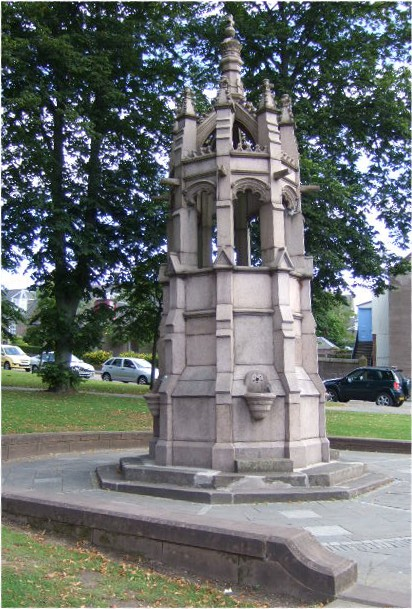
- Brechin Cathedral Town House Brechin Castle Memorial Fountain Rocks of Solitude

- Coat of Arms

- Location within Angus
- Population: 7,186 (2022)
- Demonym: Brechiner
- OS grid reference: NO600600
- Community council: City of Brechin and District
- Council area: Angus
- Lieutenancy area: Angus
- Country: Scotland
- Sovereign state: United Kingdom
- Post town: BRECHIN
- Postcode district: DD9
- Dialling code: 01356
- Police: Scotland
- Fire: Scottish
- Ambulance: Scottish
- UK Parliament: Angus and Perthshire Glens
- Scottish Parliament: Angus North and Mearns

Brechin (BREE-kin, /ˈbriːxɪn/; Scottish Gaelic: Breichinn) is a historic market town and former royal burgh in Angus, Scotland. Traditionally Brechin was described as a city because of its cathedral and its status as the seat of a pre-Reformation Roman Catholic diocese (which continues today as an episcopal seat of the Scottish Episcopal Church), but that status has not been officially recognised in the modern era.

Nevertheless, the designation is often used, with examples being the City of Brechin and District Community Council, City of Brechin and Area Partnership, City of Brechin Civic Trust and Brechin City Football Club. Kinnaird Castle is nearby. Brechin is located slightly closer to Dundee than Aberdeen on the A90 between the cities. It is the fourth largest settlement of Angus, with a population of 7,186 in 2022.

== History ==
In the centre of Brechin is a small museum in the Brechin Town House, and an award-winning tourist attraction, the Caledonian Railway. Along with the cathedral and round tower, part of the chapel of Brechin's Maison Dieu or hospital survives from the Middle Ages. The Maison Dieu was founded by William de Brechin before 1267, with an older source indicating a founding about 1256 since the charter was witnessed by Albin, who was Bishop of Brechin from 1247 to 1269. William de Brechin made a second grant of a "right of a road" in 1267. The Maison Dieu chapel is in the care of Historic Environment Scotland. The Bank Street drill hall was completed in 1879.

The Guildry Incorporation of Brechin was formed in 1629 by merchants and traders in the Burgh and in 1666 obtained recognition of its rights under Decree of the Convention of Burghs. The Guildry's historic purposes have been assumed by local government and its current functions are social and civic. On 19 October 2023, residents of the town were evacuated due to Storm Babet.

On 5 March 2025, the disused Maison Dieu church was damaged by a fire.

== Religion ==
=== Brechin Cathedral ===
The town is well known for its cathedral, with eleventh century round tower (Historic Environment Scotland), one of only two of these Irish-style monuments surviving in Scotland (the other is at Abernethy, Perthshire). The tower was originally free-standing, but is now incorporated in the framework of the cathedral.

The cathedral has been much altered, but still contains medieval work of the 13th and 14th centuries, notably a handsome western tower and processional door.

=== Scottish Episcopal Church ===
In 1695, following the Glorious Revolution, the town's Episcopalians were driven out of Brechin Cathedral which remained under the control of the Church of Scotland. A meeting house was set up in the High Street with a chapel being built in 1743. Following the Jacobite rising of 1745, the chapel's seats and books were destroyed by government forces and the chapel was taken over by a qualified congregation.

A new Episcopalian Church, St Andrews Church was built in 1809 and consecrated in June 1811. This was replaced by a new building in 1888. St Andrews Church is part of the Diocese of Brechin and its archives are held by the University of Dundee.

== Governance ==
Brechin is represented within Angus Council by three councillors who represent the Brechin & Edzell ward. In the Scottish Parliament, it is part of the Angus North and Mearns constituency and the North East Scotland electoral region. In the UK Parliament, it is part of the Angus and Perthshire Glens constituency.

== Education ==
Education in Brechin is managed by the Education Department of Angus Council. There is one secondary school in the area; Brechin High School and four feeder primary schools; Andover Primary school, Edzell Primary School, Maisondieu Primary School and Stracathro Primary School.

== Public services ==
Brechin Infirmary was designed by local architect William Fettis (or Fettes) and opened in 1869 by Fox Maule-Ramsay, 11th Earl of Dalhousie. On opening, the hospital had beds for up to 30 patients. Four new wards were added in a major extension built circa 1929 and further expansion took place in 1960 when new out-patients and physiotherapy departments were included within a separate new single-storey building. The infirmary closed in 2015 and looks set to be demolished. A parochial lodging house for paupers (a poor house) was opened in grounds next to the infirmary in 1880. It had accommodation for eighty persons in eleven wards. Renamed St Drostan's House, it was later used by Angus Council as a care home for the elderly.

== Sport ==
Brechin City F.C. contest in the Lowland Football League at its stadium Glebe Park. Glebe Park is the only senior football ground in Europe which has a hedge along one of its perimeters. Brechin is also home to the junior football club Brechin Victoria who play at Victoria Park.

Brechin Golf Club was formed in 1893, at Trinity Muir with a 9 hole course. Records show that by 1924 an agreement had been made to purchase Limefield Farm. In 1926, the famous James Braid was invited to play the course. Braid was so impressed he suggested suitable sites for sand bunkers in the Limefield section of the course. The course was expanded to the current layout to mark its centenary year in June 1993.

== Transport ==
The nearest National Rail station is at Montrose, which is a stop on the Dundee–Aberdeen line. The town was previously served by Brechin railway station, a terminus of several lines. It was closed to passengers in 1952, but has since reopened as part of the Caledonian Railway heritage line.

Local bus services are operated predominantly by Stagecoach South Scotland. Key routes connect the town with Arbroath, Dundee and Montrose.

Ember's E1 route from Aberdeen to Edinburgh serves Brechin as a prebooked stop.

The single-carriageway bypass of Brechin was dualled and reopened in March 1994, completing the upgrade of the newly numbered A90 between Perth and Aberdeen.

== Notable people ==
- Dame Anne Begg (born 1955), former Member of Parliament for Aberdeen South
- Sir David de Brechin (died 1320), Lord of Brechin
- William Eddie (1891–1979), Scottish first-class cricketer and Provost
- Douglas A. H. Graham (1893–1971), British Army officer
- Thomas Guthrie FRSE (1803–1873), Scottish divine and philanthropist
- Joseph Fairweather Lamb (1928–2015), academic and former Chandos Chair of Physiology at the University of St Andrews
- James McCosh (1811–1894), Church of Scotland and Free Church minister at Brechin. Later president of Princeton University
- David Myles (1925–2018), former MP for Banffshire and public servant
- Robin Orr (1909–2006), composer
- Robert Watson-Watt (1892–1973), radar pioneer, born in Brechin

== Gallery ==
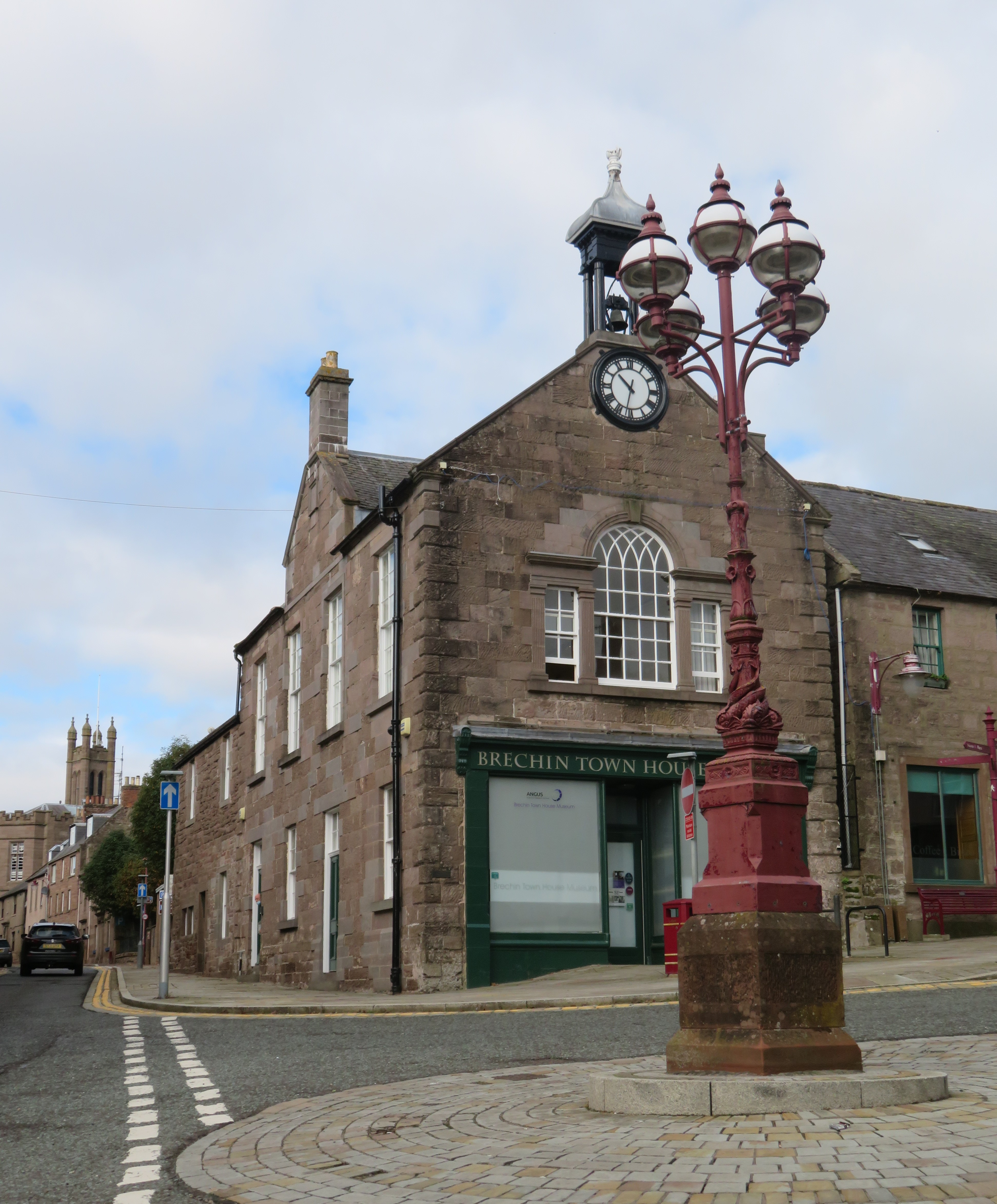
Brechin Town House

== See also ==
- Battle of Brechin
- List of places in Angus
- Brechin Castle, seat of the Earls of Dalhousie since the late 20th century
