= Stuart Wilson (cricketer) =

Scottish cricketer, cricket administrator, and educator

Personal information
- Full name: John Stuart Wilson
- Born: 22 January 1932; Middleton, Lancashire, England
- Died: 2 July 2012 (aged 80); Perth, Perthshire, Scotland
- Batting: Right-handed
- Bowling: Right-arm fast-medium

Domestic team information
- Years: Team
- 1957–1964: Scotland

Career statistics
Competition	First-class
Matches	16
Runs scored	66
Batting average	5.07
100s/50s	–/–
Top score	22
Balls bowled	2,623
Wickets	44
Bowling average	25.20
5 wickets in innings	1
10 wickets in match	–
Best bowling	5/51
Catches/stumpings	8/–
- Source: Cricinfo, 13 July 2022

John Stuart Wilson (22 January 1932 – 2 July 2012) was an English-born Scottish first-class cricketer.

Wilson was born in January 1932 at Middleton, Lancashire. He moved to Scotland as a child, where he was educated at Brechin High School. A club cricketer for both Brechin and Forfarshire Cricket Club's, he made his debut for Scotland in first-class cricket against Lancashire at Old Trafford during Scotland's 1957 tour of England. He was a regular member of the Scottish team in the late 1950s and early 1960s, making sixteen first-class appearances to 1964. Playing in the Scottish side as a right-arm fast-medium bowler, he took 44 wickets in his sixteen matches at an average of 25.20; he took one five wicket haul, with figures of 5 for 51 against the Marylebone Cricket Club in 1959. A further performance of note with the ball came in 1962 against Ireland, when his four wickets in each innings helped guide Scotland to a 5 wicket victory. As a tailend batsman, he scored 66 runs at a low batting average of 5.07. Outside of cricket, Wilson was by profession a plumber. He died at Perth in July 2012.
