= William Eddie =

Scottish cricketer and provost

Personal information
- Full name: William Eddie
- Born: 19 December 1891; Brechin, Angus, Scotland
- Died: 3 September 1979 (aged 87); Brechin, Angus, Scotland
- Batting: Right-handed
- Bowling: Right-arm medium

Domestic team information
- Years: Team
- 1913: Scotland

Career statistics
| Competition | First-class |
|---|---|
| Matches | 1 |
| Runs scored | 6 |
| Batting average | 6.00 |
| 100s/50s | –/– |
| Top score | 4 |
| Balls bowled | 156 |
| Wickets | 0 |
| Bowling average | – |
| 5 wickets in innings | – |
| 10 wickets in match | – |
| Best bowling | – |
| Catches/stumpings | 1/– |
- Source: Cricinfo, 5 November 2022

William Eddie (19 December 1891 – 3 September 1979) was a Scottish first-class cricketer and Provost.

Eddie was born at Brechin in December 1891, where he was educated at Brechin High School. A club cricketer for Brechin, Forfarshire, and Peebles County, he made a single appearance in first-class cricket for Scotland against Ireland at Edinburgh in 1913. Playing as a right-arm medium pace bowler in the Scottish team, he bowled a total of 26 wicketless overs across the match, for the cost of 90 runs. Batting twice in the match from the tail, he was dismissed for 4 runs in Scotland's first innings before being dismissed by Patrick Quinlan, while in their second innings he ended Scotland's innings of 228 for 8 not out on 2 runs, helping Scotland secure a draw. He later served as the Provost of the City and Royal Burgh of Brechin, having been Session Clerk at St Ninian's Church in Brechin from 1925 to 1950. Eddie died at Brechin in September 1979.
