= Thomas Simson =

Scottish medical academic

Thomas Simson (1696–1764) was a Scottish medical academic at the University of St Andrews.

== Life ==
He was born in 1696. He obtained the degree of MD from the University of Glasgow in 1720, and two years later, in 1722 was appointed as the first Chandos Professor of Medicine at St Salvator's College, University of St Andrews, the first specifically medical appointment at the university. He was notable for lecturing predominantly in English, rather than the Latin which was at that time the normal language within the university.

== Works ==
His publications included:

- Conick sections. Pitcarnii doctrina de circulatione sanguinii (1714)
- De Re Medica (1726)
- A System of the Womb (1729)
- An inquiry how far the vital and animal actions of the more perfect animals can be accounted for independent of the brain (1752)

== Family ==
He married Margaret Preston on 20 January 1724, who bore him four children: Preston Simson (1728–1815); Robert Simson (1731–1817); Agnes Simson (1733–1780); and James Simson (1740–1770).

He died in 1764, and who succeeded by his son James Simson as Chandos Professor at the university.
