= James Simson =

British medical academic

James Simson (1740–1770) was a medical academic and the second Chandos Professor of Medicine and Anatomy at the University of St Andrews, from (1764 to 1770). He was born on 21 March 1740, son of Thomas Simson and Margaret Simson. He was awarded the degree of MD. He succeeded his father as Chandos Professor in 1764, where he remained until his death on 30 August 1770. His library was bequeathed to the University of St Andrews Library in 1770, and the university library still owns the collection today, containing over 200 medical books.
