= Reconnect Regal Theatre =

Coordinates: 55.9022°N 3.6448°W

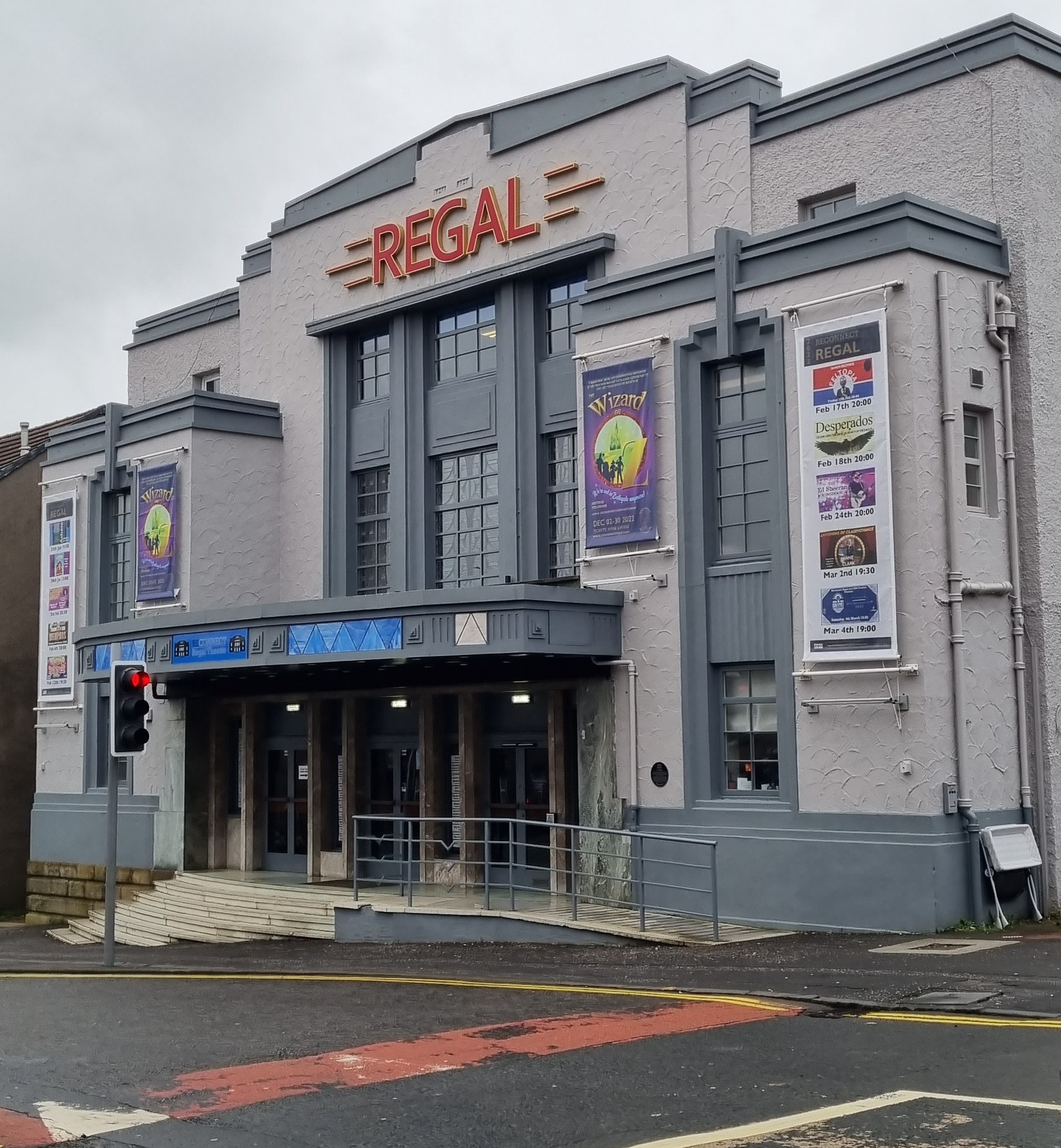
The Regal Theatre on North Bridge Street in Bathgate

Reconnect Regal Theatre is a performance art/movie theatre located in Bathgate, Scotland.

== Reconnect ==
The Reconnect Regal is the first project of the "Reconnect Charity" (Scio). The former cinema was built in 1938 and has an art-deco-style architecture. Reconnect took over the Regal in 2018 and has since grown its popularity by providing a blend of professional and community programming. The Regal requires modernization and restoration, and therefore, a comprehensive redevelopment plan is being formulated to ensure its stable future. The restoration project includes the reinstatement of the balcony, restoration of the auditorium, opening up of the bar space, and the addition of a fly tower to attract professional touring theatre to the venue. The revamped venue, which will have 500 seats, will serve both regional and local community needs.

== History ==
The Regal Community Theatre was a Scottish cinema and venue situated in Bathgate, West Lothian. The building became a listed building in 1999 and was upgraded to Category B in 2008, the decisive factor being the plasterwork by John Alexander. The Leven-based architect Andrew David Haxton designed the cinema in 1938. In 1995, the building was renovated; currently it serves as a venue for the community, offering a diverse programme of film, music, theatre, comedy, children's events and workshops. Until a change of management, it was also the home of Regal Radio (now based in another building), and it had its own animation company called Regal Animation (now closed).

The three-storey theatre is located on North Bridge Street in the centre of Bathgate. The Art Deco building is located on a flattened slope. The entrance front faces south and has five bays. It is decorated with plasterwork, colossal pilasters and stylized keystones. The outer, two-storey elements stand out in particular, with the colourful-lettered REGAL logo adorning the façade. The building has a flat-roof structure.

The floor of the foyer is decorated with terrazzo tiles, and the ceiling is decorated with plasterwork. The original stained-glass windows are partially preserved, the interior still showing the building's original purpose. The foyer is flanked by stairs that lead to the gallery and the upstairs bar. The lower parts of the walls are decorated with walnut veneer. Small exhibition rooms have been set up on both the ground floor and the second floor. The gallery on the second floor has been turned into an office.
