= Moonbeams =

Scottish charitable organisation

Moonbeams was a children's cancer charity based in Edinburgh, Scotland, which became the subject of a much-publicised local controversy in 2003. Following court action, it emerged that the charity had income of nearly £3 million over a period of four years, but had spent little over £70,000 on its charitable objectives. The Moonbeams collapse was one of a series of incidents which ultimately led to extensive reform of charity regulation in Scotland.

Although there were some irregularities in the charity's affairs, there is no suggestion of substantial fraud. The charity's income was simply consumed by expenses, with little remaining to fund its objectives. Local newspaper Scotland on Sunday quoted Jean McFadden, a charity law expert from Strathclyde University, saying: "It seemed to me that it simply grew too big for a small group of volunteers to handle and not get out of their depth".

== Foundation ==
The Moonbeams charity was founded in 1992 by former postal worker Willie Power, two years after the death from cancer of his 11-year-old daughter, Gayle. The charity was well-known locally for raising funds by selling sweets, and was dedicated to helping children with cancer and their families.

In 1998, Moonbeams set up a parallel trading company—a limited company under United Kingdom law - which was covenanted to donate its entire profit to the Moonbeams charity. This is a common and legitimate arrangement, which allows the charity effectively to trade commercially without breaking the rules associated with its charitable status.

By 1999, Moonbeams had given some 300 children holidays, days out, or a chance to meet a celebrity. In June 1999 it bought its first holiday home in York, England, with the aim of helping more children and their families to enjoy a short break away from home. By the time of Moonbeams' collapse it owned three holiday houses—two in the British Isles and one in Florida, USA.

== Suspension ==
On 14 October 2003, as a result of a complaint from a competing charity, the Court of Session in Edinburgh suspended the directors of the Moonbeams charity, appointing an accountant to run the charity's operations. The action was in response to a petition brought by the Scottish Charities Office (SCO), the precursor to the present Office of the Scottish Charity Regulator and at that time the regulator of charities in Scotland. It later emerged that the SCO had been investigating Moonbeams for around a year, based on concerns raised by their accounts.

In lodging the petition, the SCO made a number of allegations concerning the running of the Moonbeams charity and trading company. As the directors of the charity did not answer the petition by the court deadline, their responses to these allegations can be surmised only from a small number of interviews given to local media.

=== Expenditure of the trading company ===
The first complaint against Moonbeams concerned the performance of its trading company. Over four years of operation, the trading company had achieved a turnover of £2.94 million, and a net profit of £185,000. Although these figures might be reasonable for a normal commercial company, they were received with surprise by Moonbeams supporters, who had purchased the goods in the expectation that a far greater proportion of the selling price would reach the charity.

The reason for this was that the lawyers, Lindsays, recommended setting up the trading arm to absorb all the costs of the charity, including the salaries of all employees. This meant that 100% of any donations made to the charity would go to the charity and it could be advertised as such. The trading arm, Moonbeams UK, would pay all the bills.

The petition also revealed that Moonbeams' performance had deteriorated sharply as the trading company's operations expanded. Between July 1998 and March 1999 the company had a turnover of a little less than £100,000, and made a profit of around £40,000. But in the following year to March 2000, while turnover increased to over £550,000, the profit was less than £2,000; and in the year to March 2001 the profit was £2,250 on a turnover of nearly £1 million.

Attention naturally focussed on where the outstanding money had gone. Quoted in Scotland on Sunday, Bill Cleghorn, a forensic accountant appointed by the court, said: "There’s nothing we have come across yet that would indicate there’s anything criminal. We have high administration costs, a lot of travel costs and credit card costs." Moonbeams did indeed sign up for some bad deals but in the opinion of those who worked there, it was better getting more money and helping more families in need than not doing anything.

Reported in local newspaper the Edinburgh Evening News, Willie Power, the founder of Moonbeams, responded: "Obviously, a mistake has been made somewhere, but it has been an unintentional and honest mistake. We are a group of people whose lives have been touched by cancer and want to help in some way. We are not business professionals." Subsequently quoted in Scotland on Sunday, he said: "I truly believe we did our best. There were no flash cars. I think the offices are quite nice but it's not all leather seats, it wasn't 'expense no object'."

=== Failure to transfer funds from trading company to charity ===
Under a Deed of Covenant, Moonbeams' trading company was obliged to transfer almost all its profits to the Moonbeams charity, so that it could be spent on charitable objectives. But the SCO stated in their petition to court that, of the £185,461 net profit raised by the trading company over four years of operation, £101,006 had remained in the trading company's accounts. This is the origin of the often-quoted figure of around £70,000 which finally made its way to the charity.

=== Use of property in Florida ===
The SCO's petition also stated that, on a single occasion, Katherine Power - the daughter of the charity's founder - had been allowed to use the charity's house in Florida. The SCO argued that this was contrary to the objects of the charity, as it deprived a family of a child with cancer of the opportunity to use the house.

Responding to the allegation, Willie Power accepted that his daughter had used the house but argued that it would otherwise have been empty at the time. He also stated that travel costs had not been met by the charity.

=== Auditing ===
The SCO's petition further stated that one of Moonbeams' former directors, Gary Easton, had acted as auditor for the charity while also a director, in breach of professional rules. Easton was not, however, a director of either the charity or the trading company at the time of the petition.

The matter was subsequently referred to Easton's professional body, the Association of Certified Chartered Accountants.

=== Payments to directors ===
Although not referred to in the original petition, two queries concerning payments to directors arose after the court action.

Willie Power, the founder of Moonbeams, was criticized by local media for demanding £3,000 in salary to cover the period immediately prior to the charity's collapse. However, the court-appointed administrator pointed out that he was simply claiming the same rights as any employee. Power had earlier stated that his annual salary from the charity was just £25,000.

In November 2007, four years after the collapse of Moonbeams, Gary Easton made a voluntary agreement to repay an undisclosed portion of the £93,000 he had received from the charity in professional fees. The liquidators had argued that the original fees had been excessive.

== Liquidation ==
On 9 December 2003, the Court of Session made permanent the removal of the directors and trustees of Moonbeams. In April 2004, the court-appointed administrator began the process of liquidating the charity.

== Regulatory reform ==
The Moonbeams incident was one of a series affecting Scottish charities in and around 2003. Most notably, earlier in 2003, the directors and trustees of Breast Cancer Research (Scotland) had been similarly suspended by the Court of Session—again following the discovery that only a small fraction of its income had funded charitable objectives.

Much of the blame was laid on the weak Scottish regulatory framework, which was (and remains) entirely separate from the system overseen by the Charity Commission for England and Wales. At the time there was no requirement for charities to submit annual accounts, or even to register unless they wished to claim tax benefits. Shortly after the Moonbeams directors were suspended, Professor Gordon McVie, former chief executive of Cancer Research UK, described Scotland as a "soft touch" and said "the reputation that Scotland has got is that there isn't yet a charity commission functioning".

By the time of the incidents, the then Scottish Executive had already set up a commission to consider the law relating to Scottish charities. The commission's report recommended the establishment of a new regulator for charities in Scotland and the creation of a register of Scottish charities. Although this report was published in June 2001, it is widely thought that the events of 2003 prompted the Executive to act on it. Quoted in Scotland on Sunday, the chair of the commission, Jean McFadden, said: "Our report seemed to disappear into a great black hole and nothing much happened. ... I think it would still be lying there had it not been for the breast cancer scandal."

A bill to create the new regulator was placed before the Scottish Parliament in June 2004, and received broad cross-party support. It received Royal Assent on 14 July 2005. The Act co-opted the Office of the Scottish Charity Regulator (OSCR), which had been established in December 2003 as an executive agency, and placed it under the direct control of the Scottish Parliament. The OSCR took over key responsibilities from the Inland Revenue in April 2006.

== See also ==
- Breast Cancer Research (Scotland), another charity which collapsed in 2003
- The Office of the Scottish Charity Regulator
