= Brechin Town House =

Municipal building in Brechin, Scotland

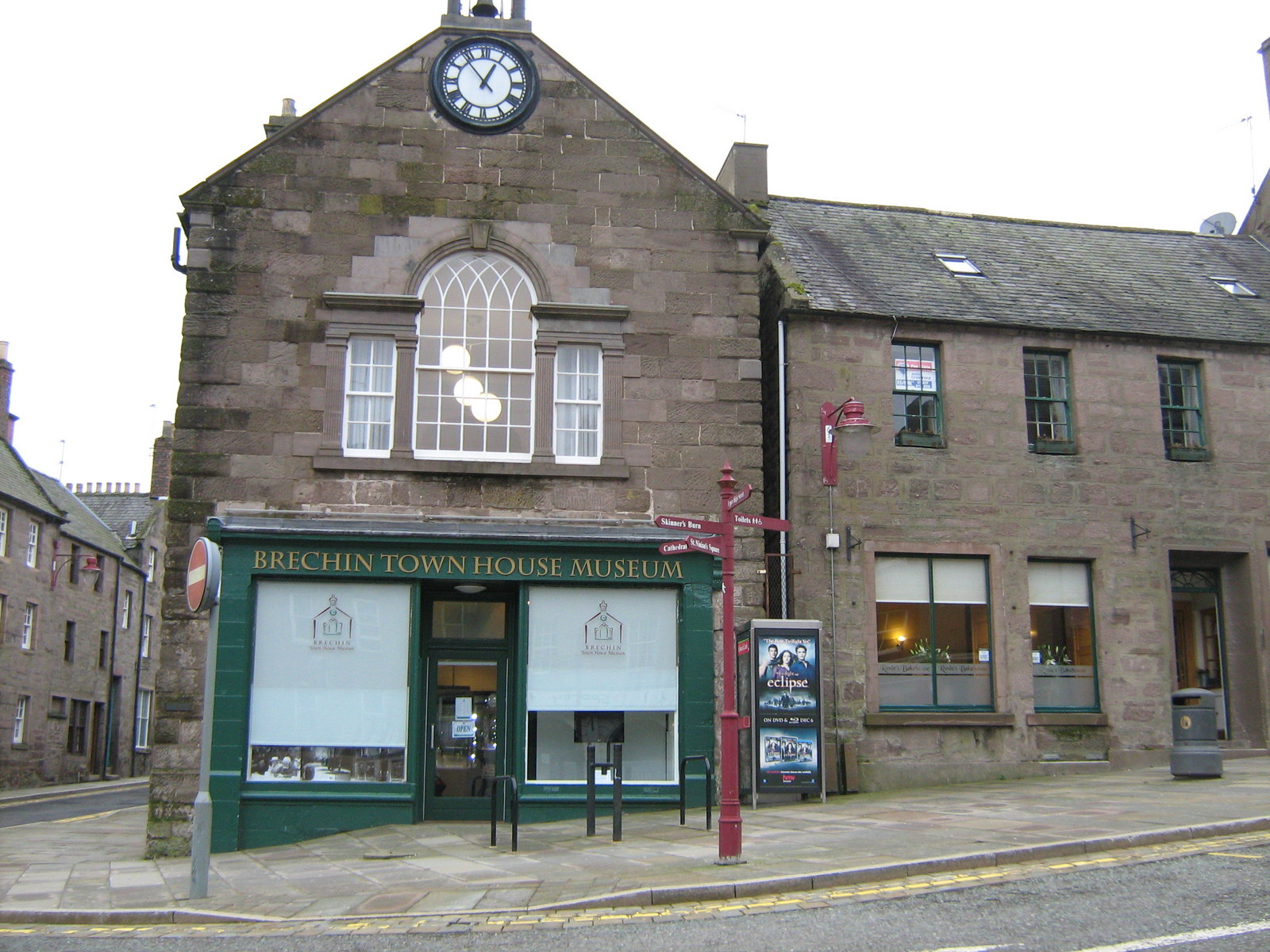
- Brechin Town House

- Shown in Angus
- 56.7316°N 2.6604°W
- Location: High Street, Brechin

History
- Built: 1790

Site notes
- Architectural style: Italianate style

Listed Building – Category B
- Official name: Old Town Hall, 28 High Street, and 2 Church Street
- Designated: 11 June 1971
- Reference no.: LB22495

Brechin Town House is a municipal structure in the High Street in Brechin, Angus, Scotland. The structure, which was used as a museum from 2003 to 2023, is a Category B listed building.

== History ==
The first municipal building in the town was a tolbooth which was erected on the current site and dated back at least to the first half of the 15th century. The ground floor was used as a prison and the first floor accommodated the burgh council chamber: it was replaced by a town house in the late 17th century. It was at the mercat cross in front of this building that James Maule, 4th Earl of Panmure proclaimed James Francis Edward Stuart, known as the "Old Pretender", as King James VIII during the Jacobite rising of 1715.

By the 1780s, the old town house had become dilapidated, and the burgh council decided to demolish it and build a new town house, financed by public subscription, on the same site: major contributors included the member of parliament, Sir David Carnegie, 4th Baronet. Construction works on the new building started in spring 1789. It was designed in the Italianate style, built by a local contractor, George Scott, in sandstone at a cost of £629 and was completed in 1790. The building cost more than was originally budgeted and the local guild was given naming rights over the building, which became known as the "Guildhall of Brechin", in return for paying for the extra cost. The design involved a symmetrical main frontage with a single large bay facing onto the High Street; it originally featured three square headed windows on the ground floor and a Venetian window on the first floor. The structure was surmounted by a pediment with a clock in the tympanum. At roof level there was a rectangular cupola with Doric order columns supporting an ogee-shaped roof. Internally, the principal room was the assembly hall which featured a coved ceiling and pilasters designed in the style of William Adam. There were prison cells on the ground floor but, after a more substantial prison was completed in Southesk Street in 1844, the cells were converted for use as offices for the local police force.

The building continued to serve as the headquarters of the borough council for the rest of the 19th century but ceased to be the local seat of government when the municipal offices were established in Bank Street in 1900. The building was subsequently converted for retail use with a modern shopfront being installed in the early 20th century: by the start of the First World War the building was operating as a bakery and confectionery shop. A small museum, which brought together local history artefacts previously held in the local mechanics' institute and in the local library, was established in the town house in 2003. Items on display included a model of the town in 1820 and dioramas depicting a priest in Brechin Cathedral and a petty criminal in one of the town house cells.

After the managers, Angus Alive, handed the museum back to the local council, the museum closed in October 2023.

== See also ==
- List of listed buildings in Brechin, Angus
