= Bathgate =

Town in West Lothian, Scotland

Coordinates: 55.902359°N 3.643097°W

Bathgate: Scottish Gaelic: Both Chèit; Scots: Bathket / Bathkit
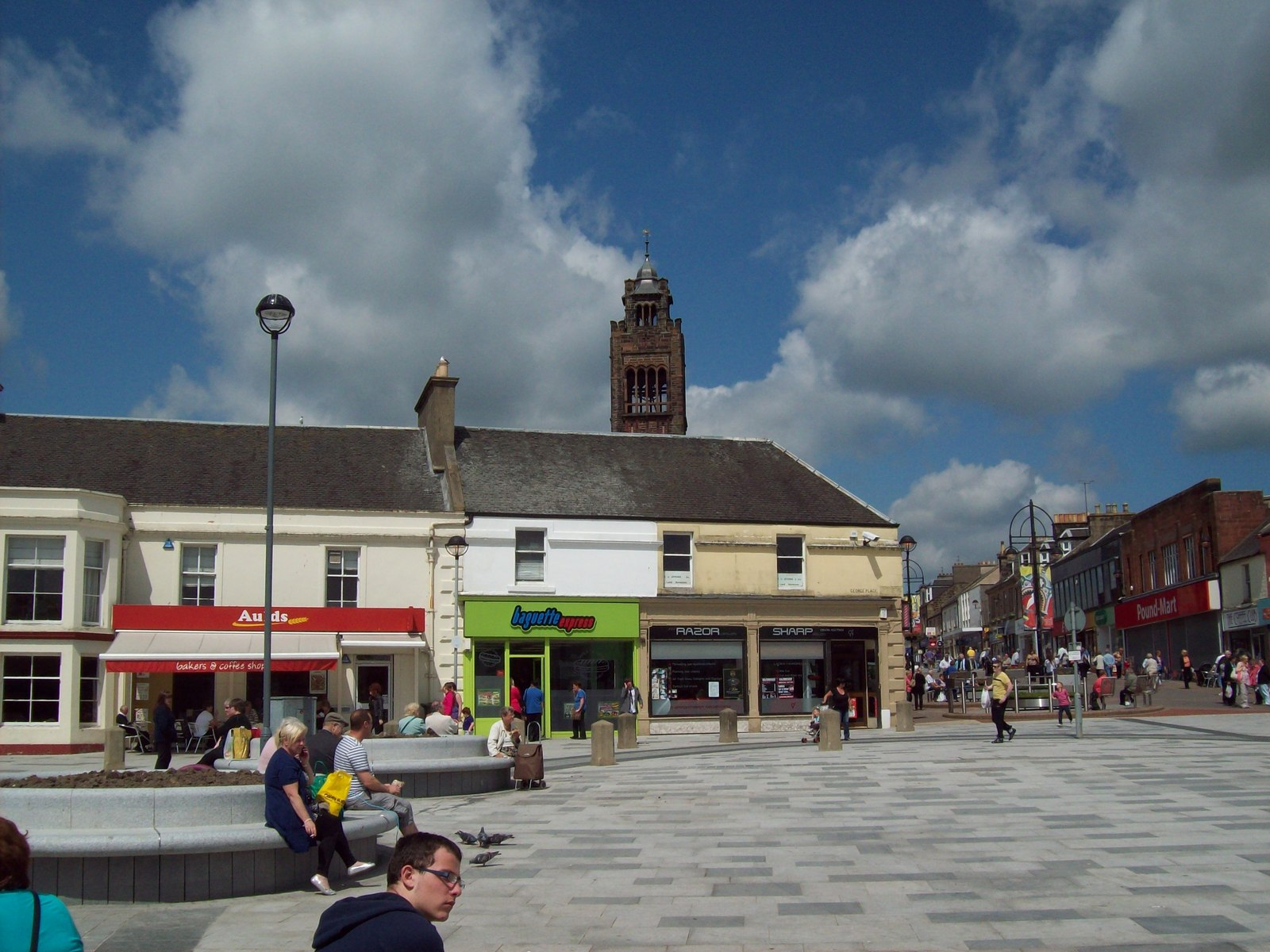
- "The Steelyard", Bathgate, July 2011

- Location within West Lothian
- Population: 23,600 (2020)
- OS grid reference: NS973689
  - Edinburgh: 18 mi (29 km)
  - London: 336 mi (541 km)
- Council area: West Lothian
- Lieutenancy area: West Lothian
- Country: Scotland
- Sovereign state: United Kingdom
- Post town: BATHGATE
- Postcode district: EH47, EH48
- Dialling code: 01506
- Police: Scotland
- Fire: Scottish
- Ambulance: Scottish
- UK Parliament: Bathgate and Linlithgow
- Scottish Parliament: Bathgate

Bathgate (Scots: Bathket or Bathkit, Scottish Gaelic: Both Chèit) is a town in West Lothian, Scotland, 5 miles (8 km) west of Livingston and adjacent to the M8 motorway. Nearby towns are Linlithgow, Livingston, and West Calder. A number of villages fall under the umbrella of Bathgate, including Blackburn, Whitburn, Stoneyburn, Armadale, Torphichen and Fauldhouse.

Situated 2 miles (3 km) south of the ancient Neolithic burial site at Cairnpapple Hill, Bathgate and the surrounding area show signs of habitation since about 3500 BC and the world's oldest known reptile fossil has been found in the town. By the 12th century, Bathgate was a small settlement, with a church at Kirkton and a castle north of the present day town centre. Local mines were established in the 17th century but the town remained small in size until the coming of the industrial revolution. By the Victorian era, Bathgate grew in prominence as an industrial and mining centre, principally associated with the coal and shale oil industries. By the early 20th century, much of the mining and heavy industry around the town had ceased and the town developed manufacturing industries, principally in vehicle production and later electronics before these factories closed in the late 20th century.

Today Bathgate is the second largest town in West Lothian, after Livingston and serves as a regional commuter town within the Scottish Central Belt.

== History ==
=== Medieval (circa 1100–1500) ===
Remains of Bathgate's former Parish Church south of Kirkton Park

Bathgate first enters the chronicles of history in a confirmation charter by King Malcolm IV of Scotland (1141 – 9 December 1165). In royal charters of the 12th, 13th and 14th centuries, the name of Bathgate has appeared as: Bathchet (1160), Bathket (1250) and Bathgetum (1316). Batket in the 14th century, and by the 15th appeared as both Bathgat and Bathcat, the latter an offshoot of Uchtred Dalrymple's feudal lineage, which ruled during ancient times. The name is a "manifest corruption" of an earlier Cumbric name meaning 'Boar Wood' (cf. Welsh baedd coed).

Early records of Bathgate are somewhat sketchy. It is recorded that, around 1160, Uchtred Dalrymple, Sheriff of Linlithgow, and Geoffrey de Melville came to Bathgate at the command of King Malcolm IV and measured out an area of land which was to form the basis of Bathgate Parish. The church and all its associate property were placed under the auspices of Holyrood Abbey at that time and paid a tenth of its income from the land to that institution.

In 1315, the daughter of King Robert I of Scotland (Robert The Bruce), Marjorie (alternatively spelt Margery) Bruce, married Walter Stewart (or Steward) (1293–1326), the 6th Lord High Steward of Scotland. The dowry to her husband included the lands and castle of Bathgate. Walter died at the castle on 9 April 1326. This marriage is still celebrated in an annual pageant forming part of the Bathgate Procession & John Newland Festival, colloquially known as the Bathgate Procession.

In the 1846 book A Topographical Dictionary of Scotland, Samuel Lewis writes:

Of this ancient castle, some slight traces of the foundations only are discernible, in a morass about a quarter of a mile [400 m] from the town, in which, though it has been drained and brought into cultivation, kitchen utensils of brass, and coffins rudely formed of flat stones, have been discovered by the plough.

Another antiquarian, W. Jardin, in the Statistical Account of Scotland Vol I (1793), and referring to Walter Stewart, states:

Some traces of his mansion may be seen in the middle of a bog or loch about 1/4 mile [400 m] from the town. Hewn stones have frequently been dug from the foundations, and some kitchen-utensils of copper or brass have been found.

Dating from around the same time the remains of Bathgate's former parish church still stand at Kirkton. The original 12th-century construction was absorbed by a later build in 1739 when a new church was erected on the same site. The walls of the church were consolidated in 1846. This simple whitewashed edifice served the community until its last service on 9 April 1882. King Malcolm IV makes reference to the original church in a charter, granting it to the monks of Holyrood Abbey. Records show that Holyrood Abbey gave the church to the abbot and monks of Newbattle Abbey in 1327.

=== 17th–18th centuries ===
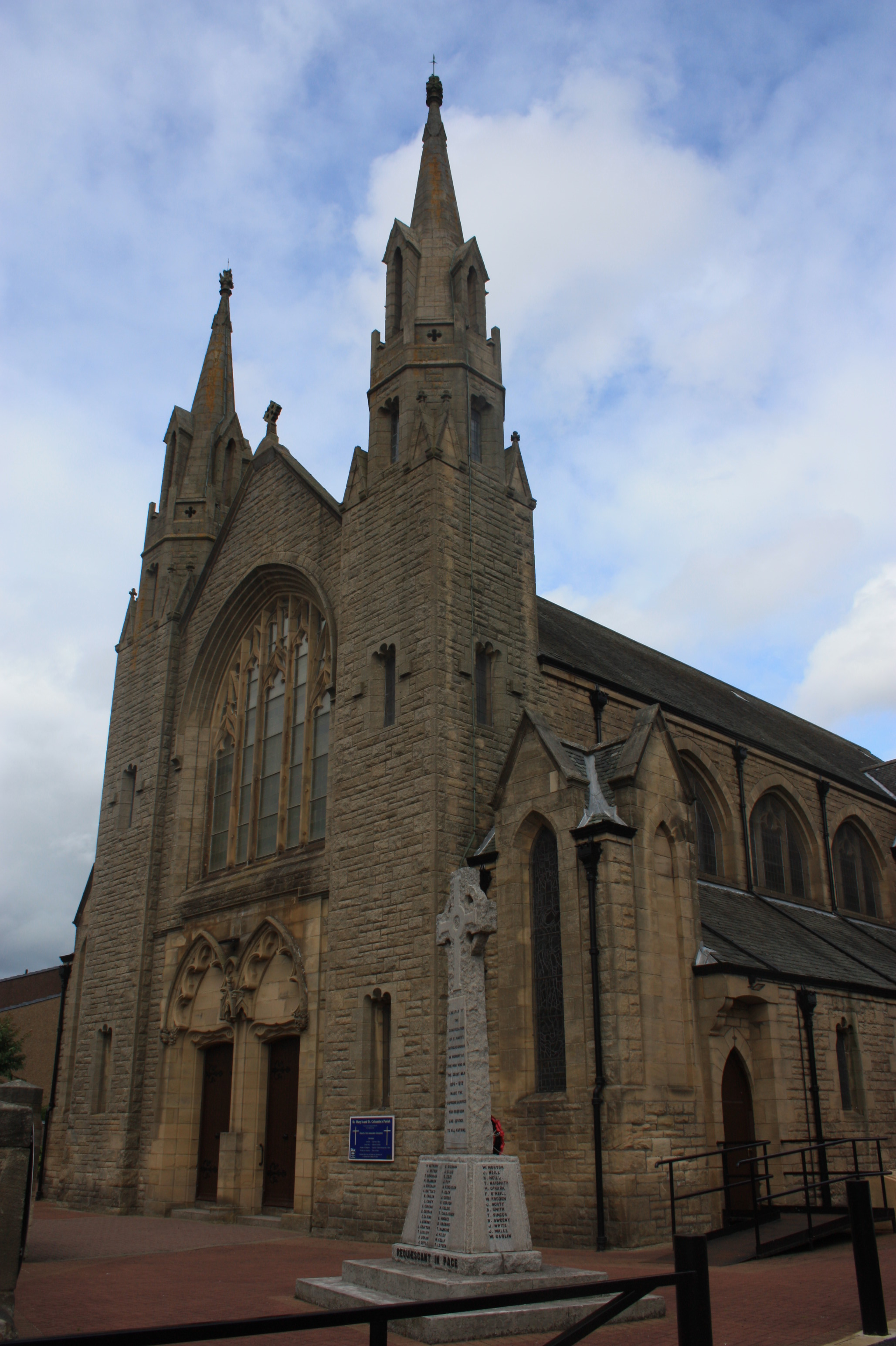
St Mary’s RC Church, Bathgate by Charles Menart

In 1606 silver ore was found at nearby Hilderston, in the shadow of Cairnpapple Hill, by a prospecting collier, Sandy Maund. This accidental discovery began a short-lived crown "project" in the area. Advisers to King James VI of Scotland became aware of the discovery, and in April 1608 repossessed the land for the crown. The prospector Bevis Bulmer and Thomas Foulis opened a mine called "God's Blessing". A sample of the ore was shipped to London, and assayed in the Tower of London by Andrew Palmer. By December 1608 it was clear that the ore in the mine was of varying quality and by March 1613 all efforts to extract silver from the area were abandoned.

Bathgate remained a very small rural community until the middle of the 19th century with only a foray by Covenanters in the 17th century to unrest the populace. Francis Groome, in the Ordnance Gazetteer of Scotland (1882–84) writes:

Some of the inhabitants suffered hardship and loss in the times of the persecution; and the insurgent army of the Covenanters, when on their march from the W to Rullion Green, spent a disastrous night at Bathgate.

Robert Louis Stevenson, in the book Lay Morals, Part 2: The Pentland Rising. A Page of History further elucidates upon this night in November 1666:

A report that Dalzell was approaching drove them from Lanark to Bathgate, where, on the evening of Monday the 26th, the wearied army stopped. But at twelve o’clock the cry, which served them for a trumpet, of 'Horse! horse!’ and 'Mount the prisoner!’ resounded through the night-shrouded town.

His depiction goes on to describe how the half the army perished in the freezing weather as they headed towards the Pentland Hills.

=== 19th century ===
Former Bathgate Academy in 2010

Established around 1800, the Glenmavis Distillery in Bathgate was purchased in 1831 by John McNab, who produced the eponymous MacNab's Celebrated Glenmavis Dew from the site until the distillery's closure in 1910. In 1885, the distillery was producing 80,000 gallons of single malt a year which was transported to Scotland, England and the colonies.

In 1831 Bathgate Academy was built. Designed by the Edinburgh architects R & R Dickson this is Bathgate's only large public building of historic merit. It was endowed by a Jamaican plantation owner John Newlands. The building later became part of Balbardie Primary School, and later still was changed into private housing.

By the opening of Edinburgh and Bathgate Railway in 1849, local mines and quarries were extracting coal, lime, and ironstone.

James Young's discovery of cannel coal in the Boghead area of Bathgate, and the subsequent opening of the Bathgate Chemical Works in 1852, the world's first commercial oil-works, manufacturing paraffin oil and paraffin wax, signalled an end to the rural community of previous centuries. When the cannel coal resources dwindled around 1866, Young started distilling paraffin from much more readily available shale. The landscape of the Lothians is still dotted with the orange spoil heaps (called bings) from this era. Collieries and quarries and the associated industries (brickworks, steelworks) were the main employers in Bathgate as the 19th century drew to a close.

Between 1882 and 1884, Bathgate High Parish Church was constructed on Jarvey St. Designed by Wardrop and Reid, the church was built of sandstone in Romanesque architectural style. It is Category B listed.

=== 20th century to present ===
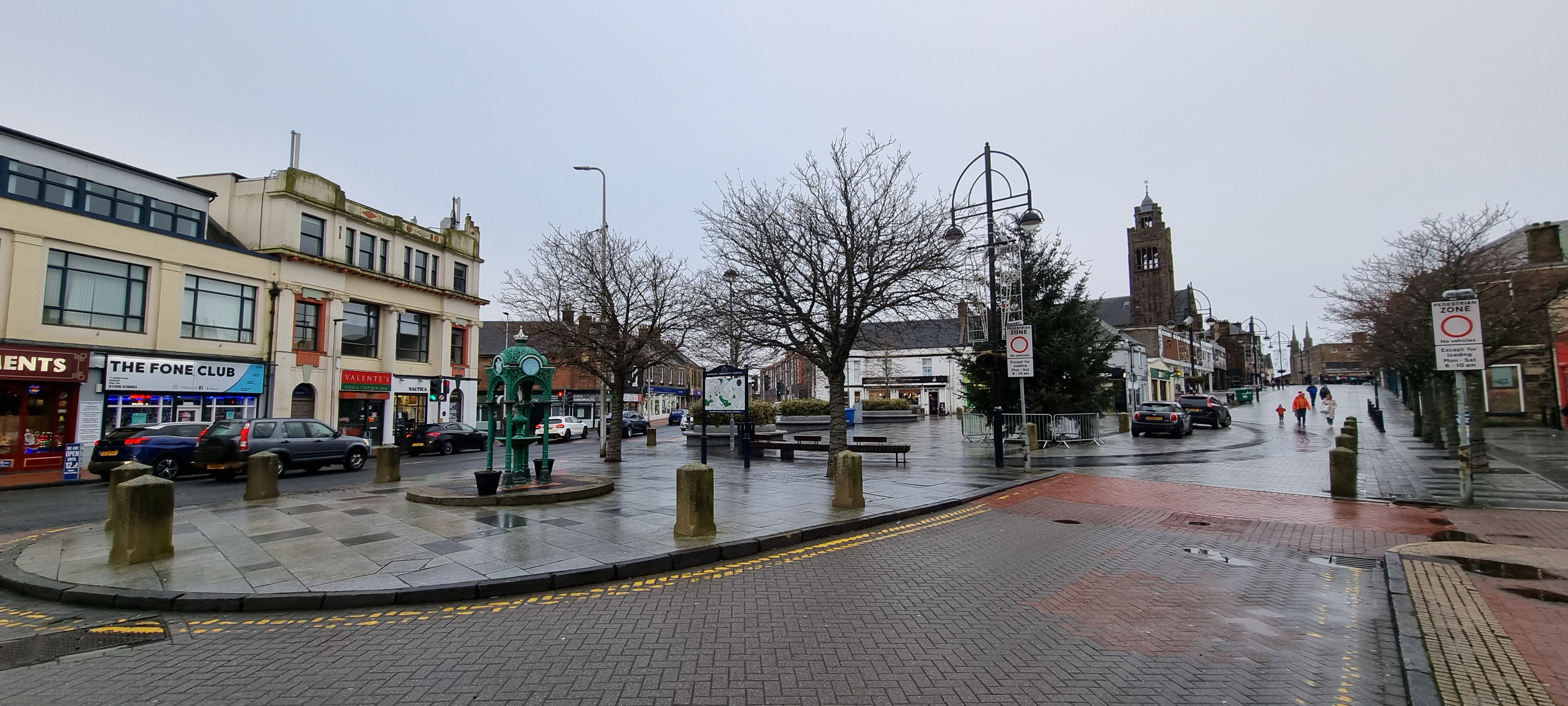
George Place and the Steelyard in central Bathgate, with the McLagan Fountain

In 1904, St David's Church was built in Bathgate on George Street. Designed by the Scottish architect James Graham Fairley, it is in Early English architectural style and the church is Category B listed. The church includes a belltower in north Italian campanile style. A few years later in 1908, St Mary's Roman Catholic Church was built to a design by Charles Ménart on Livery Street. St Mary's is in a Gothic architectural style and is Category C listed.

In the mid-20th century, many local industries in the town had closed and West Lothian was designated a Special Development Area. In such areas, extra financial inducements were offered by the British government to assist companies wishing to relocate. As a result, in 1961, the BMC—which consisted of the merged Austin Motor Company and Morris Motors—located a new truck and tractor plant in Bathgate rather than expanding their Longbridge plant as originally planned. The plant closed in 1986 under ownership of British Leyland. The area was later redeveloped as the Wester Inch Village, a housing estate in the early 21st century with more than 1,700 homes added.

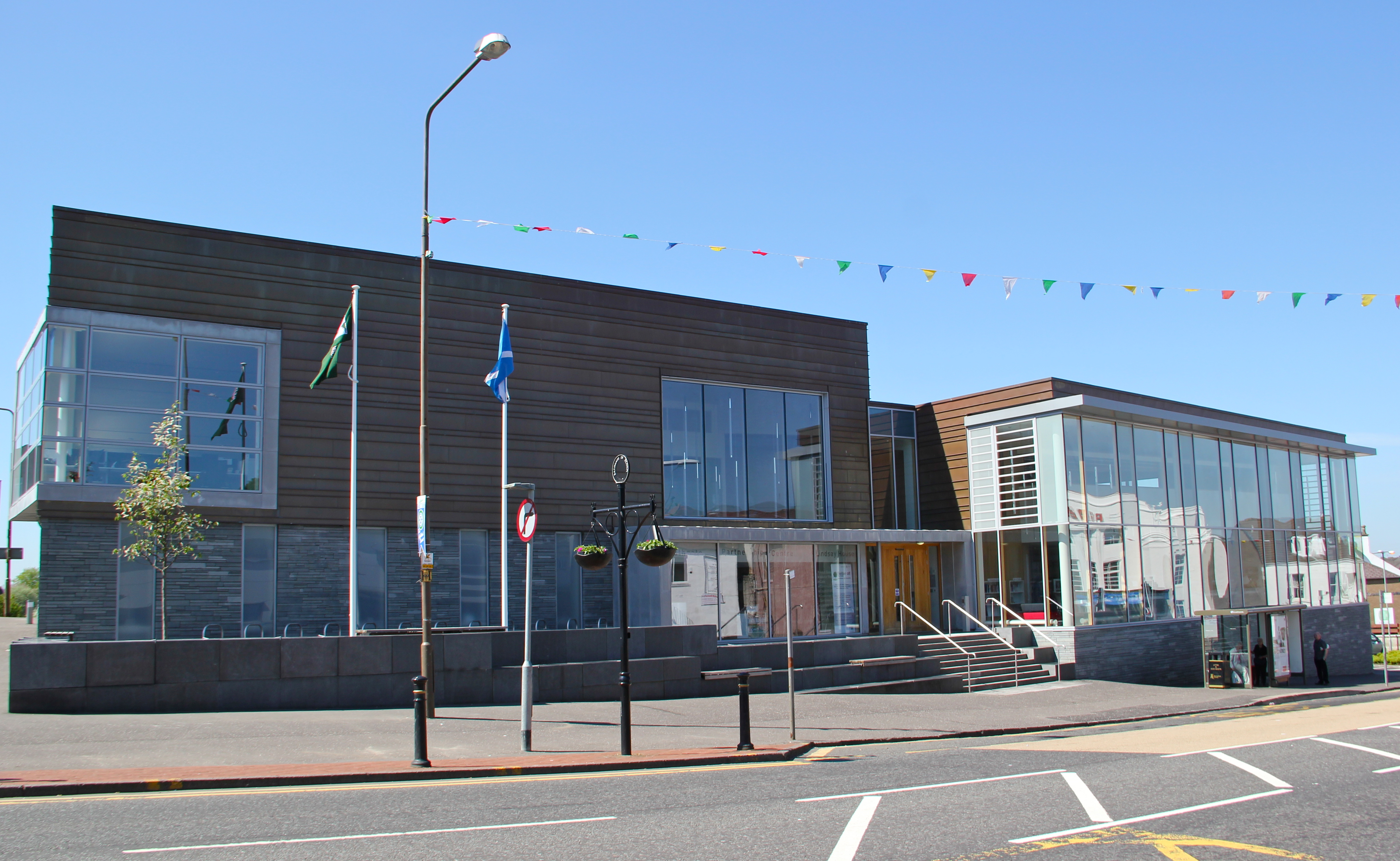
Bathgate Partnership Centre – Lindsay House, opened 28 October 2011

On 24 March 1986, the Bathgate-Edinburgh railway line was re-opened to passengers for the first time since the 1950s. This railway line was extended as the Airdrie-Bathgate Rail Link to Airdrie allowing train services to run between Glasgow Queen Street and Edinburgh Waverley via Bathgate on time and on budget in December 2010.

The world's oldest known reptile fossil, Westlothiana lizziae (affectionately referred to as Lizzie), was discovered in East Kirkton Quarry, Bathgate in 1987; it is now in the Museum of Scotland.

Early in 1992, the US company Motorola opened a mobile phone manufacturing (Personal Communications Sector or PCS) plant at Easter Inch in Bathgate (now the Pyramids Business Park). In 2001, the global market for mobile phones dropped sharply and as a consequence, despite pressure from the highest levels of UK government, on 24 April 2001 Motorola announced the closure of the plant and the loss of 3,106 jobs. The 93-acre (380,000 m^{2}) site was occupied by HMRC. In 2021 and early 2022, the Pyramids operated as the principal COVID-19 vaccine centre in West Lothian. In December 2021, it was announced that the Pyramids Business Park would become the site of a new large film and TV studio. Some previous productions at the site have included the film T2 Trainspotting and the TV show Good Omens, which stars local actor David Tennant.

== Demography ==
Year	1861	1871	1881	1891	1901	1911	1921	1941	1951	1961	1971	1981	1991	2001	2011
Population	4,827	4,991	6,425	5,786	7,549	8,226	8,504	10,127	11,291	not available	not available	not available	13,819	15,068	20,363
Sources:Online Historical Population Reports, A Vision Of Britain Through Time, General Register Office for Scotland and https://www.scotlandscensus.gov.uk/

== Economy ==
Bathgate was an industrial town in its time. It played host to the Menzies' Foundry (demolished due to the railway link construction) and British Leyland was sited in Bathgate. It had two train stations, Bathgate North and South. There was a link that ran from the site of the current station, along Menzies Road, at the rear of one side of Mill Road all the way to Easton Road where the station was. This was used for the coal-mining industries and the foundries.

Bathgate is home to a number of national and international retailers. In the late 19th century the co-operative halls were built and served the community until closure in the 1980s. It provided a bakery, butchery, funeral parlour, grocery store, clothing, furniture and a dance hall. Even after the closure the co-operative dance hall was used as the Room at the Top until it caught fire in 1997.

== Culture ==
=== Bathgate Procession and Community Festival ===
John Newland was one of the town's early major benefactors. Newland had emigrated to the West Indies and became a rich planter, using slaves to maintain and harvest his sugar-cane crop. His benefaction allowed the establishment of Bathgate Academy, which was founded in 1833. He was remembered by an annual pageant (known as the Procession or Newland's day), held on the first Saturday in June. In light of the 2020 Black Lives Matter protests a petition to change the processions name due to Newlands slave trade past, gained hundreds of signatories. In June 2020 the name was changed to the more suitable 'Bathgate Procession and Community Festival'.

=== Theatre and cinema ===
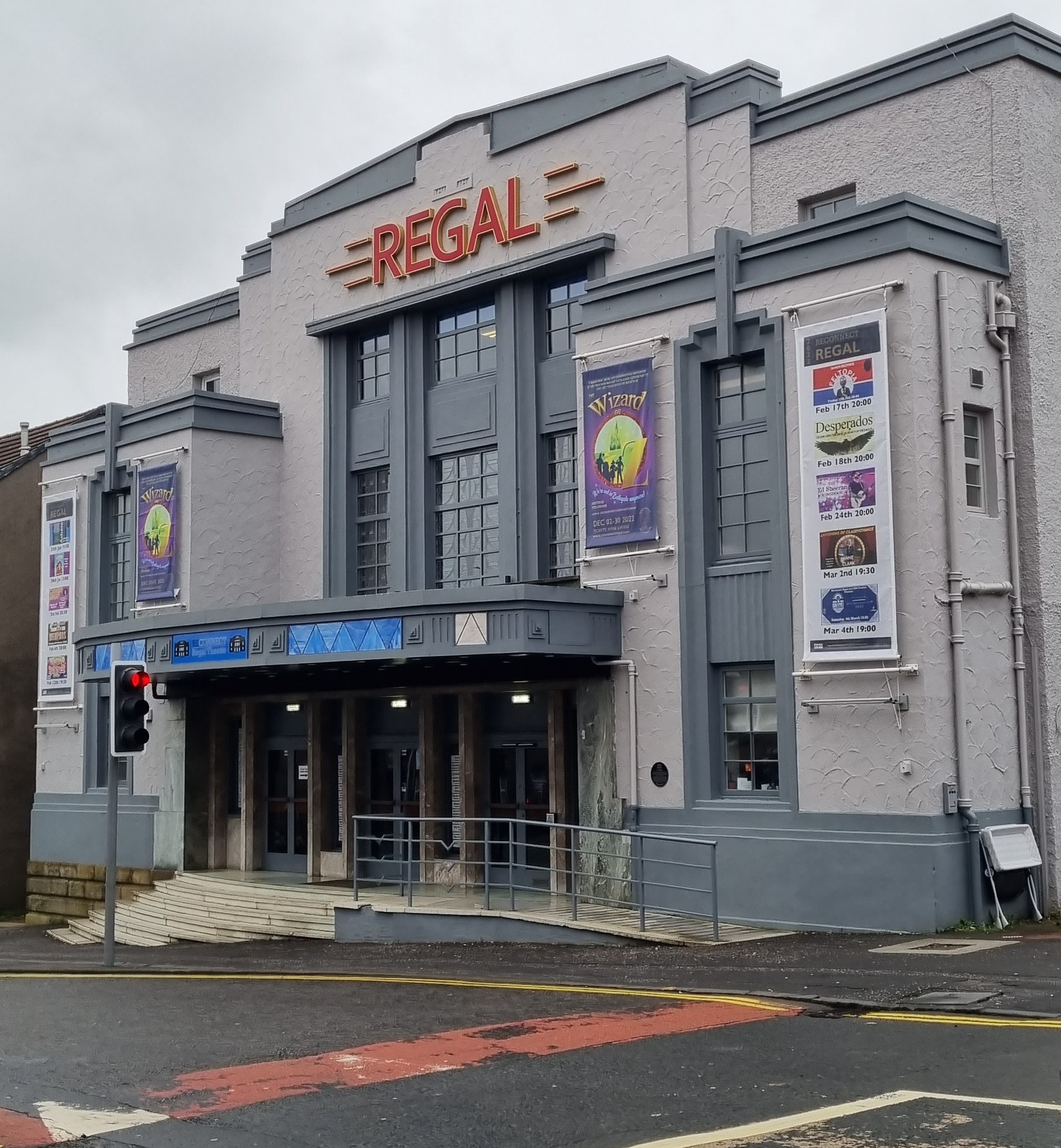
The Regal Theatre on North Bridge Street

The Regal is a community theatre in Bathgate on North Bridge Street. The theatre was originally a cinema, completed in 1938 and later renovated in 1995. It is in the Art Deco style.

The local cinema, Bathgate Cinema, located on the site of the old St Davids Church closed in April 2024.

=== George Place and the Steelyard ===
The central town square of Bathgate is known as the Steelyard which lies to the north of George Place. The Steelyard has a memorial fountain, the McLagan Fountain, provided with support from the wife of the 19th century MP Peter McLagan. It was produced by Walter MacFarlane & Co. and erected in 1878 at the crossroads with Hopetoun Street but later moved to its present position.

=== Bennie Museum ===
The Bennie Museum is a local community museum in the town. The museum opened in 1989 and is run by volunteers as a charitable trust. It contains items connected with the history of Bathgate and well as exhibits of childhood life. The museum is located at 9-11 Mansefield Street in a row of cottages that are Category C listed dating between the late 18th and mid 19th century in construction.

=== Parks ===
Parks in Bathgate include Kirkton Park (an historic town park), as well as the Balbardie Park of Peace. Wester Inch Ponds is a public park with numerous ponds that are used as the sustainable urban drainage system for the Wester Inch estate.

=== Land art ===
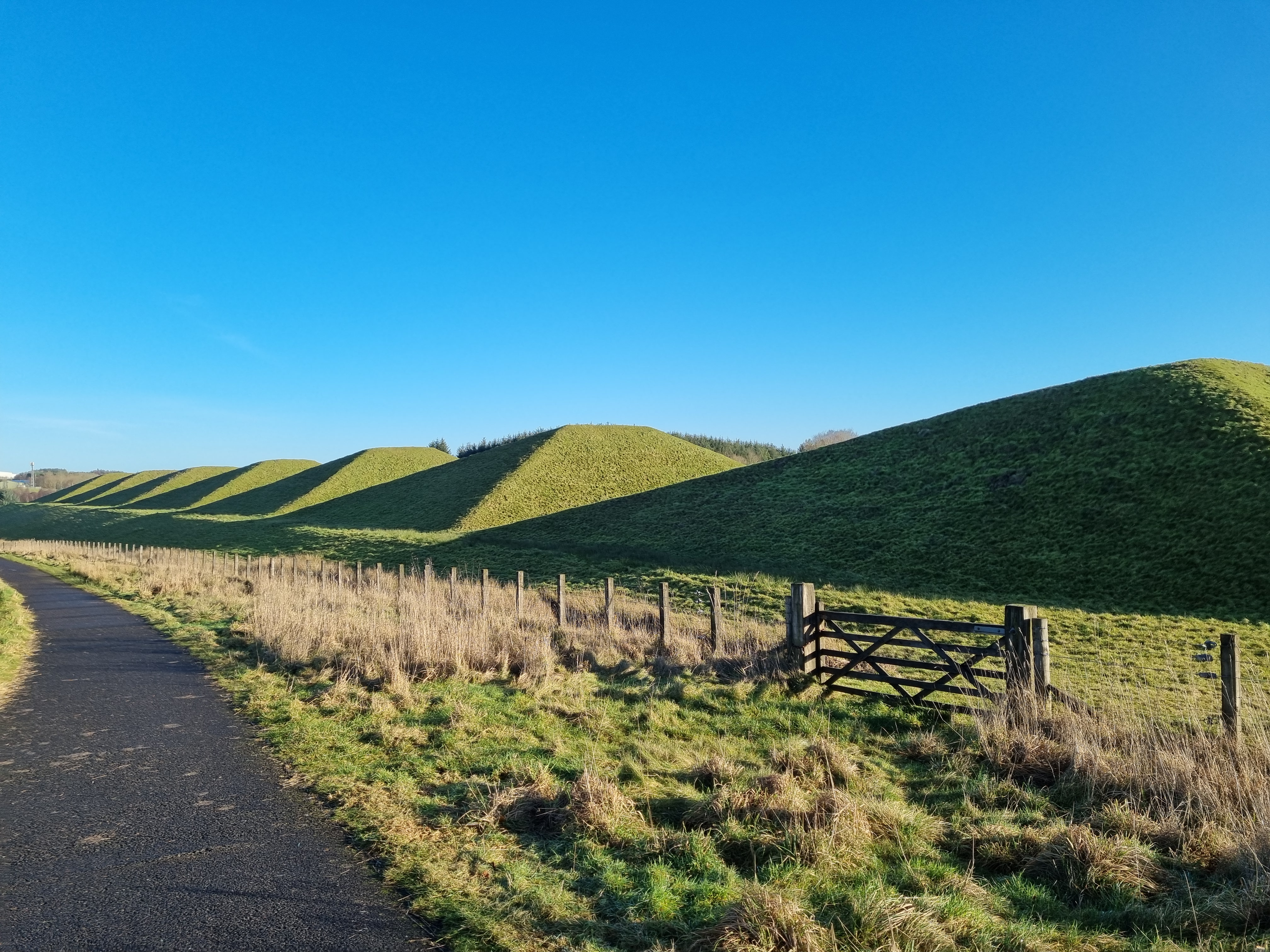
Bathgate Pyramids Business Park

Part of the M8 Art Project saw the artist Patricia Leighton's 'Sawtooth Ramps' project being built in 1993, now more commonly referred to as the Pyramids. The sculpture is 300-metre (980 ft) long and consists of seven 11-metre (36 ft) high ramps. The artist based the design on local geographic features (drumlins) and the shape of the surrounding bings. The pyramidal shape of the sculpture gave rise to the name of the nearby Pyramids Business park. In April 2007, a local farmer painted the sheep which graze on the pyramids bright red with a harmless sheep spray.

In 1998 the artist Lumir Soukup built the earth sculpture The Bathgate Face at Wester Inch. By taking facial measurements of more than 1200 Bathgate residents, the artist was able to create an 'average profile' which was the basis for the sculpture. Development in the area in 2004 threatened to demolish the sculpture but the artist managed to persuade developers to build around his work.

=== Music ===
Bathgate was home to rock band Goodbye Mr Mackenzie in the 1980s and 1990s, a success of the local college's Music Industry course.

== Transport ==
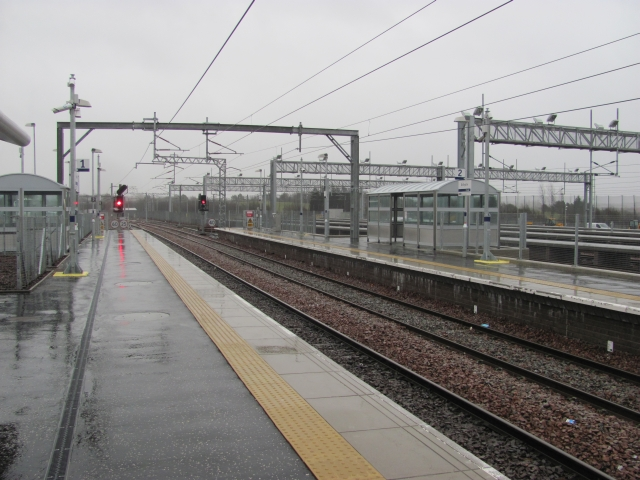
Bathgate Railway Station

Bathgate has easy access to the M8 motorway via Junctions 3A and 4, linking the town to Edinburgh, Inverclyde via Glasgow and towns in between. The A801 links Bathgate to the M9 via Polmont.

Bus Services in Bathgate are co-ordinated by West Lothian Council and are provided principally by Lothian Country Buses, SD Travel and E&M Horsburgh. Frequent and daily direct services exist to Falkirk, Westfield, Armadale, Blackridge, Whitburn, Fauldhouse, Torphichen, Linlithgow, Broxburn, Uphall, Newbridge, Deans, Livingston, East Calder and Edinburgh.

Lothian Country operates the main bus services through Bathgate as listed below:

- 73 - Livingston - St. John's Hospital - Boghall - Bathgate - Wester Inch - Blackburn
- X18 - Edinburgh - Corstorphine - Broxburn - Bathgate - Armadale - Whitburn
- X27 - Edinburgh - Sighthill - Calderwood - East Calder - Livingston - Bathgate
- X28 - Edinburgh - Sighthill - Kirknewton - East Calder - Livingston - Bathgate
- N18 - Edinburgh - Corstorphine - Broxburn - Bathgate (Weekend Night Service)
- N28 - Edinburgh - Kirknewton - Calderwood - East Calder - Livingston - Bathgate (Night Service)

Bathgate Railway Station is operated by Scotrail and is served by eastbound services to Edinburgh Waverley and westbound services to Helensburgh Central via Glasgow, and Milngavie via Glasgow. Edinburgh Airport is 13 miles (21 km) away.

== Education ==
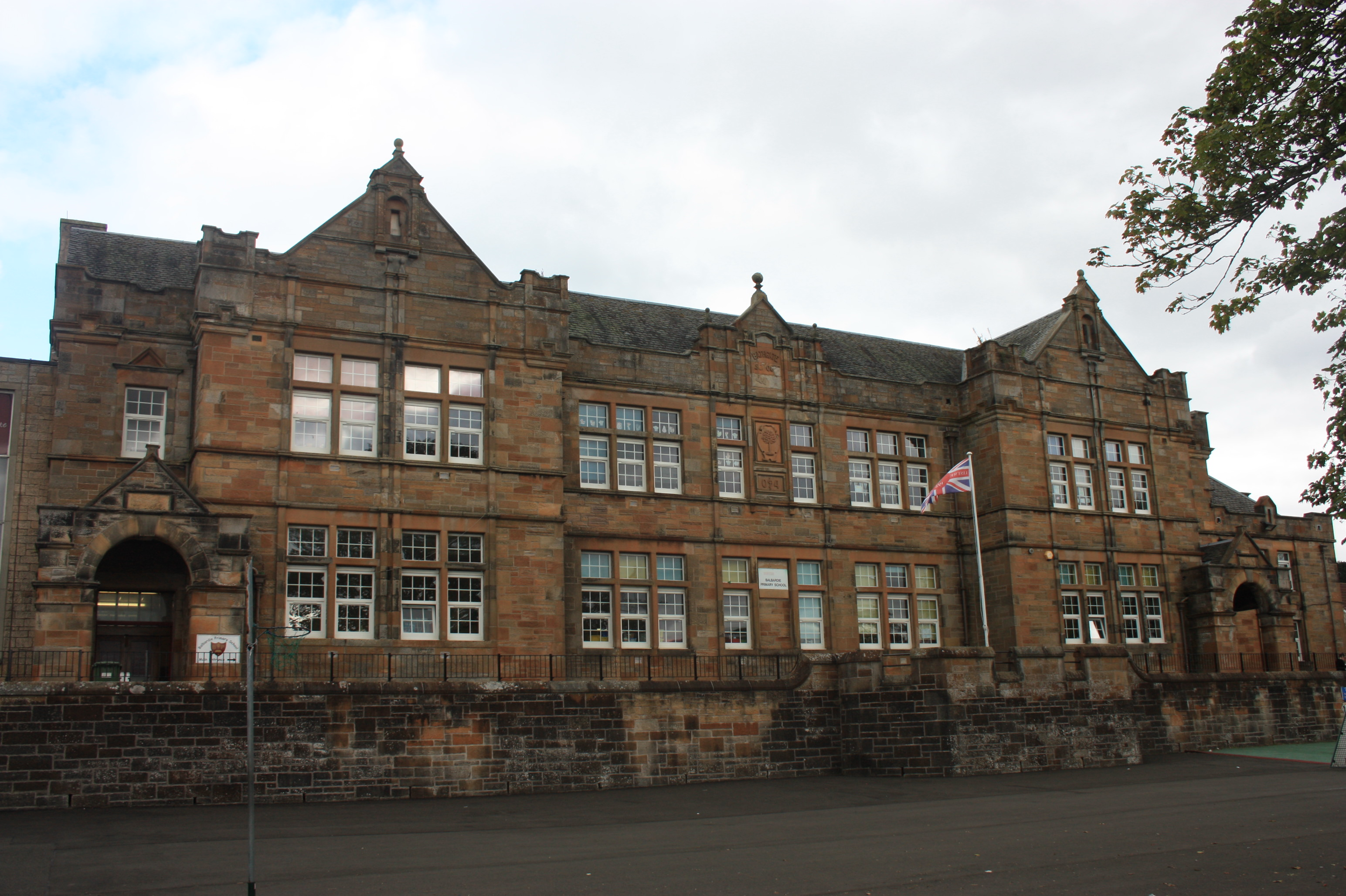
Balbardie Primary School, Bathgate

The local secondary schools are Bathgate Academy and St Kentigern's Academy. The Bathgate primary schools are Balbardie, St Mary's, Boghall, St Columba's, and Windyknowe and Simpson Primary, opened on the site of the British Leyland Factory in August 2007. It serves the area Wester Inch. The school is named after James Young Simpson.

== Sport ==
=== Football ===
Bathgate is home to the football club Bathgate Thistle, winners of the Scottish Junior Cup in 2008. They play at the Creamery Park and now compete in the East of Scotland Football League. Their stadium is also used for activities such as football roadshows.

Bathgate FC were active between 1893 and 1938 and played at Mill Park.

=== Motorsport ===
Paul di Resta, former Formula One driver with Sahara Force India and now driving for Mercedes in the DTM touring car series, grew up in the town of Bathgate. He won many admirers in his debut F1 season of 2010 and had been tipped to land a seat at a constructor challenging higher up the grid in the coming seasons, but ultimately returned to DTM in 2014 after failing to secure an F1 ride for that season. He is cousin to two other notable drivers who also hail from Bathgate—the now-retired multiple IndyCar champion Dario Franchitti and his younger brother Marino, currently racing sports cars in Europe and North America.

== Notable people ==
Notable Bathgate residents have included Sir James Young Simpson, an obstetrician and significant figure in the history of medicine. He was the first physician to demonstrate the anaesthetic properties of chloroform on humans. James Wardrop, King George IV's surgeon, was born in Bathgate and went on to coin the term keratitis and discover the childhood cancer retinoblastoma. Other political and religious figures include Richard Bladworth Angus, a Scottish-Canadian financier, banker, and philanthropist, as well as co-founder of the Canadian Pacific Railway, and the Very Revd Dr Alexander McDonald, former Moderator of the General Assembly of the Church of Scotland. Hugh Murnin MP was a Member of Parliament for Stirling and Falkirk 1922–1923, 1924–1931. William Wolfe, born in Bathgate was a former Leader of the Scottish National Party 1969-1979. In theology, James Morison was a Scottish cleric who became the founder of the Scottish Evangelical Union, also known as Morisonianism.

In the performing arts, notable persons include David Tennant (born in Bathgate but raised in Paisley), Lewis Capaldi (singer-songwriter), Isla Fisher (actress lived here from a young age until six years old in 1982), and Fern Brady (comedian and writer). The indie rock band Goodbye Mr Mackenzie was formed in Bathgate.

In sports, Bathgate professional golfers have included Eric Brown, Bernard Gallacher and Stephen Gallacher (nephew of Bernard). Other sportspersons include Richard Brittain (footballer), David Robertson (footballer), Elliot Bunney (international athlete), Dario Franchitti (IndyCar racing driver) and Marino Franchitti (sports car racing driver; younger brother of Dario).

== Partner towns ==
- Cran-Gevrier, France

and as part of West Lothian with:

- Hochsauerland, Germany

== Bibliography ==
- Price, Glanville, Languages in Britain and Ireland (p122), ISBN 978-0-631-21581-3
- Lewis, Samuel, A Topographical Dictionary of Scotland (1846), ISBN 978-0-8063-1255-2
- Groome, Francis Hindes, Ordnance Gazetteer of Scotland: A Survey of Scottish Topography, Statistical, Biographical and Historical, ISBN 978-1-85506-572-7
- Sinclair, Sir John, Statistical Account of Scotland, ISBN 978-0-7158-1001-9
- Stevenson, Robert Louis, Lay Morals, ISBN 978-1-4142-1587-7
- Hendrie, William Fyfe and Mackie, Allister, The Bathgate Book, ISBN 978-0-9541426-0-5
- Hendrie, William Fyfe, Bathgate, ISBN 978-0-7524-2125-4
- Hendrie, William Fyfe, Bathgate in Old Picture Postcards, ISBN 978-90-288-3167-4
