= Breast Cancer Research (Scotland) =

Defunct cancer charity based in Scotland

Breast Cancer Research is a defunct cancer charity that was based in Paisley and Glasgow, Scotland. It had its assets frozen in 2003 after a probe found that only £1.5m of the £13m it had raised was donated to charity. The group's fundraiser, Tony Freeman, of Glasgow, was paid about 60 per cent – some £8 million – of the charity's cash in commission. Several organizers as well as the fundraiser were barred from running charities in the UK. Solutions RMC was employed to fundraise for Breast Cancer Research charity and accused of taking too large a share of donations.

Its registered charity number was SC024834. As at 2008, the Office of the Scottish Charity Regulator record states that the charity's status is "Judicial factor appointed" and that the register "currently hold no contact details for this charity".

== See also ==
- Moonbeams, a cancer children's charity also hit by scandal
