= Chandos Chair of Medicine and Anatomy =

The Chandos Chair of Medicine and Anatomy is a Chair in Medicine and Anatomy of the University of St Andrews, Scotland. It was established in 1721, by a bequest of £1000 from James Brydges, 1st Duke of Chandos – then the Chancellor of the university. His original aim was to establish a Chair of Eloquence, although this was rejected by the university in favour of a chair in Medicine and Anatomy. Holders of the Chandos Chair are known as Chandos Professors. The Chandos Chair still exists today, although in 1875 it became a chair in physiology.

- Thomas Simson 1722–1764
- James Simson 1764–1770
- James Flint 1770–1811
- Robert Briggs 1811–1840
- John Reid 1841–1849
- George Edward Day 1849–1863
- James Bell Pettigrew 1875–1905
- Percy Theodore Herring 1908–1948 – first described Herring bodies
- Anthony Elliot Ritchie 1948–1969
- Joseph Fairweather Lamb 1969–1993
- Ian Johnston 1997–present

== Sources ==
- The Scottish Review. A. Gardner. 1895. pp. 61–.
