= Results breakdown of the 2019 United Kingdom general election =

2019 United Kingdom general election
- 12 December 2019
- All 650 seats in the House of Commons; 326 (Note: Given that Sinn Féin MPs do not take their seats and the Speaker and deputies do not vote, the number of MPs needed for a majority is, in practice, slightly lower. Sinn Féin won 7 seats, meaning a practical majority requires at least 320 MPs.) seats needed for a majority
- Turnout: 67.3% (▼1.6 pp)
Party	Leader	Vote %	Seats	+/–
Conservative	Boris Johnson	43.6	365	+48
Labour	Jeremy Corbyn	32.1	203	−59
Liberal Democrats	Jo Swinson	11.5	11	−1
SNP	Nicola Sturgeon	3.9	48	+13
Green	Jonathan Bartley; Siân Berry	2.7	1	0
DUP	Arlene Foster	0.8	8	−2
Sinn Féin	Mary Lou McDonald	0.6	7	0
Plaid Cymru	Adam Price	0.5	4	0
SDLP	Colum Eastwood	0.4	2	+2
Alliance	Naomi Long	0.4	1	+1
This lists parties that won seats. See the complete results below.
Prime Minister before	Appointed Prime Minister
Boris Johnson; Conservative	Boris Johnson; Conservative

This is the results breakdown of the 2019 United Kingdom general election.

== Vote shares ==
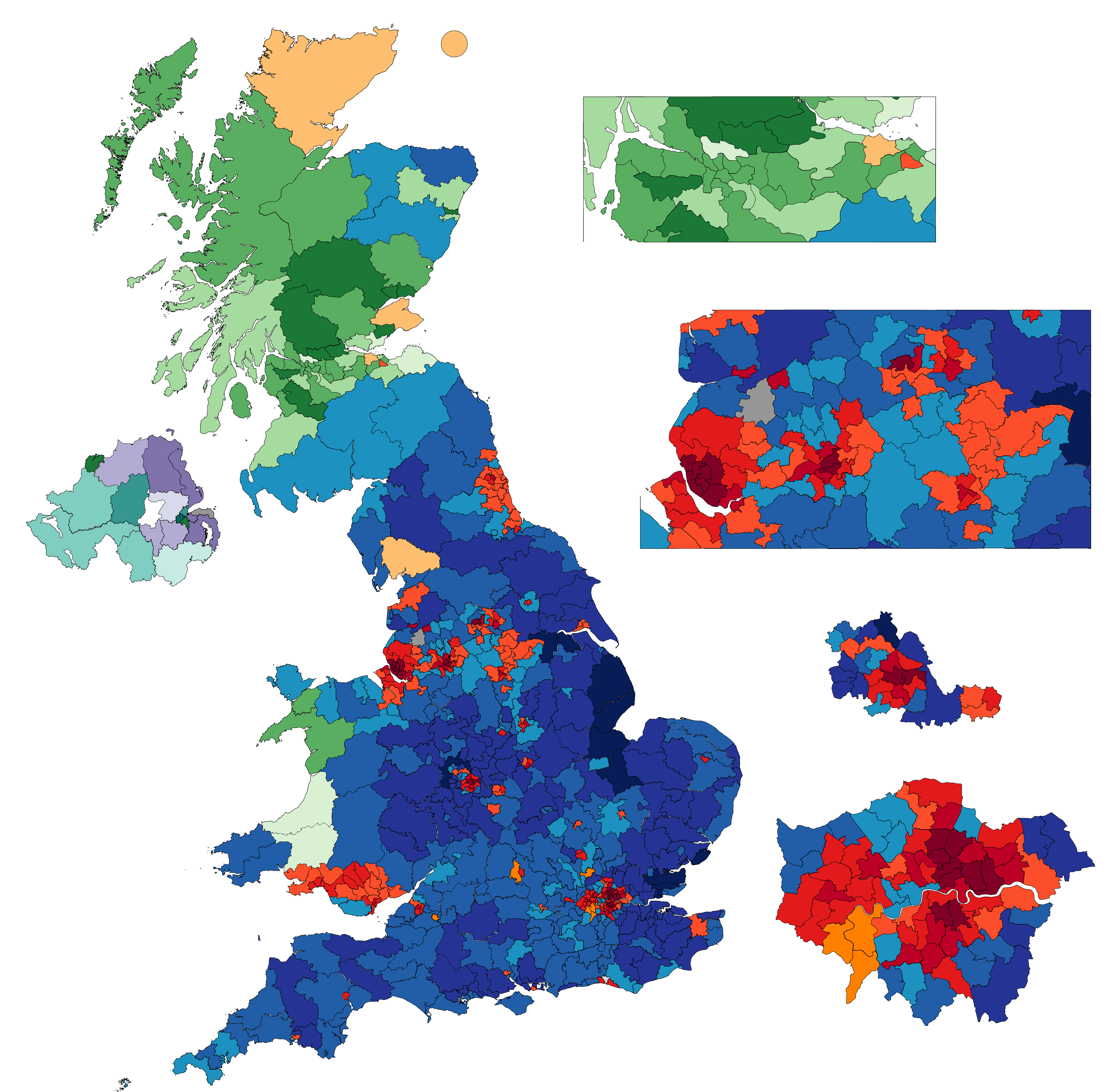
Results of the 2019 General Election by Party Vote Share Conservative >70% Conservative 60%–70% Conservative 50%–60% Conservative <50% Labour >70% Labour 60%–70% Labour 50%–60% Labour <50% Nationalist >50% Nationalist 45%–50% Nationalist 40%–45% Nationalist <40% Republican >50% Republican 45%–50% Republican 40%–45% Republican <40% Unionist 45%–50% Unionist 40%–45% Unionist <40% Liberal Democrats >50% Liberal Democrats <50% Others

Change in vote share
Party	2017	2019	Change
Conservative Party	42.4%	43.6%	+1.2
Labour Party	40.0%	32.1%	−7.8
Liberal Democrats	7.4%	11.5%	+4.2
Scottish National Party	3.0%	3.9%	+0.9
Green Party	1.6%	2.7%	+1.1
Brexit Party	N/A	2.0%	+2.0
Other(s)	5.6%	4.1%	−1.5
Total %	100.0	100.0	–

== Results by party ==
Results of the December 2019 general election to the House of Commons of the United Kingdom
Political party	Leader	Candidates	MPs					Votes		
Political party	Leader	Candidates	Total	Gained	Lost	Net	Of total (%)	Total	Of total (%)	Change (%)
Conservative	Boris Johnson	635	365	58	10	▲48	56.2	13,966,454	43.63	+1.2
Labour	Jeremy Corbyn	631 (Note: Includes 50 Co-operative Party candidates, as part of the Labour-Co-op alliance)	202 (Note: Includes 26 Co-operative Party MPs, as part of the Labour-Co-op alliance)	1	61 (Note: Includes 12 Co-operative Party MPs, as part of the Labour-Co-op alliance)	▼60 (Note: Includes -12 Co-operative Party MPs, as part of the Labour-Co-op alliance)	31.1 (Note: Includes 4.0% for the Co-operative Party, as part of the Labour-Co-op alliance)	10,269,051 (Note: Includes 1,025,882 for the Co-operative Party, as part of the Labour-Co-op alliance)	32.08 (Note: Includes 3.2% for the Co-operative Party, as part of the Labour-Co-op alliance)	−7.9 (Note: Includes -1.0% for the Co-operative Party, as part of the Labour-Co-op alliance)
Liberal Democrats	Jo Swinson	611	11	3	4	▼1	1.7	3,696,419	11.55	+4.2
Scottish National Party	Nicola Sturgeon	59	48	14	1	▲13	7.4	1,242,380	3.88	+0.8
Green Party of England and Wales	Siân Berry and Jonathan Bartley	472	1	0	0	0	0.2	835,597	2.61	+1.1
Brexit Party	Nigel Farage	275						644,257	2.01	
DUP	Arlene Foster	17	8	0	2	▼2	1.2	244,128	0.76	−0.1
Sinn Féin	Mary Lou McDonald	15	7	1	1	0	1.1	181,853	0.57	−0.2
Plaid Cymru	Adam Price	36	4	0	0	0	0.6	153,265	0.48	0.0
Alliance	Naomi Long	18	1	1	0	▲1	0.2	134,115	0.42	+0.2
SDLP	Colum Eastwood	15	2	2	0	▲2	0.3	118,737	0.37	+0.1
UUP	Steve Aiken	16						93,123	0.29	0.0
Yorkshire	Christopher Whitwood	28						29,201	0.09	0.0
Scottish Greens	Patrick Harvie & Lorna Slater	22						28,122	0.09	
Speaker	Lindsay Hoyle	1	1	1	1	0	0.2	26,831	0.08	0.0
UKIP	Patricia Mountain (interim)	44						22,817	0.07	−1.8
Ashfield Ind.	Jason Zadrozny	1						13,498	0.04	0.0
Liberal	Steve Radford	19						10,876	0.03	0.0
The Independent Group for Change	Anna Soubry	3						10,006	0.03	
Aontú	Peadar Tóibín	7						9,814	0.03	
Monster Raving Loony	Howling Laud Hope	24						9,739	0.03	0.0
People Before Profit	Collective	2						7,526	0.02	
Birkenhead Social Justice	Frank Field	1						7,285	0.02	
CPA	Sidney Cordle	29						6,486	0.02	0.0
Heavy Woollen Independents	Aleksandar Lukic	1						6,432	0.02	
SDP	William Clouston	20						3,295	0.01	0.0
Animal Welfare	Vanessa Hudson	6						3,086	0.01	0.0
North East	Mark Burdon	2						2,637	0.01	
Lincolnshire Independent	Marianne Overton	1						1,999	0.01	
Green Party Northern Ireland	Clare Bailey	3						1,996	0.01	
English Democrat	Robin Tilbrook	5						1,987	0.01	0.0
Libertarian	Adam Brown	6						1,780	0.01	0.0
Mebyon Kernow	Dick Cole	1						1,660	0.01	0.0
Proud of Oldham and Saddleworth	Paul Errock	2						1,606	0.01	
Independent Network	Ian Stephens	1						1,542	0.0	
Gwlad	Gwyn Wigley Evans	3						1,515	0.00	
Cynon Valley	Andrew Chainey	1						1,322	0.00	
VPP	Robin Horsfall	2						1,219	0.00	
Burnley and Padiham Party	Mark Payne	1						1,162	0.00	
Shropshire Party	Robert Jones	1						1,141	0.00	
Putting Cumbria First	Jonathan Davies	1						1,070	0.00	
Peace	John Morris	2						960	0.00	
Wycombe Independents	Matt Knight	1						926	0.00	
JAC	Donald Jerrard	3						728	0.00	
Christian	Jeff Green	2						705	0.00	0.0
Renew	Julie Girling	4						545	0.00	0.0
Workers Revolutionary	Joshua Ogunleye	5						524	0.00	0.0
BNP	Adam Walker	1						510	0.00	0.0
Parties with fewer than 500 votes each		40						5,697	0.02	
Independent (non-party) candidates		224			1	▼1		206,486	0.64	
Blank and invalid votes								117,919	—	—
Total		3320	650			0	100	32,014,110	100	0.0
Registered voters, and turnout								47,587,254	67.52	−1.3

== Seats which changed hands ==
- 79 seats changed hands, neglecting any intervening by-elections since the 2017 general election. These are listed at 2019 United Kingdom general election.
- The Conservatives gained 54 from Labour, 3 from the Lib Dems and 1 from Speaker. They lost 1 to Labour, 2 to the Lib Dems, and 7 to the SNP, giving them a net gain of 48 seats.
- Labour lost the 54 as said but gained one, Putney, in direct reply, and lost 6 to the SNP and lost 1 to Speaker, giving them a net loss of 60 seats.
- The SNP gained 7 from the Conservatives, 6 from Labour, and 1 from the Lib Dems, and lost 1 to the Lib Dems, making a SNP net gain of 13 seats.
- The Lib Dems gained 3 seats (2 Conservative and 1 SNP) and lost 4 (3 to Conservatives and 1 to SNP) leaving them 1 down.
- In Northern Ireland, the SDLP gained 2 seats (from Sinn Fein and DUP), Sinn Fein gained 1 (from DUP), and Alliance gained 1 (formerly independent Unionist).

== Defeated MPs ==
Party	Name	Constituency	Office held whilst in Parliament	Year elected	Defeated by	Party
Labour	Richard Burden	Birmingham Northfield	Shadow Minister for Roads & Road Safety (2013–2016)	1992	Gary Sambrook	Conservative
Labour	Helen Goodman	Bishop Auckland	Shadow Foreign Minister	2005	Dehenna Davison	Conservative
Labour	Gordon Marsden	Blackpool South	Shadow Minister for Higher Education, Further Education and Skills	1997	Scott Benton	Conservative
Labour	Dennis Skinner	Bolsover	Chairman of the National Executive Committee	1970	Mark Fletcher	Conservative
Labour	David Crausby	Bolton North East		1997	Mark Logan	Conservative
Labour	Madeleine Moon	Bridgend	President of the NATO Parliamentary Assembly (2018–2019)	2005	Jamie Wallis	Conservative
Labour	Julie Cooper	Burnley	Shadow Community Health Minister	2015	Antony Higginbotham	Conservative
Labour	James Frith	Bury North		2017	James Daly	Conservative
Labour	Susan Elan Jones	Clwyd South		2010	Simon Baynes	Conservative
Labour	Thelma Walker	Colne Valley		2017	Jason McCartney	Conservative
Labour	Laura Smith	Crewe and Nantwich	Shadow Minister of State for the Cabinet Office (2018)	2017	Kieran Mullan	Conservative
Labour	Hugh Gaffney	Coatbridge, Chryston and Bellshill		2017	Steven Bonnar	SNP
Labour	Jenny Chapman	Darlington	Shadow Brexit Minister	2010	Peter Gibson	Conservative
Labour	David Hanson	Delyn	Shadow Minister of State for Immigration (2011–2015)	1992	Rob Roberts	Conservative
Labour	Paula Sherriff	Dewsbury	Shadow Minister for Social Care and Mental Health	2015	Mark Eastwood	Conservative
Labour	Caroline Flint	Don Valley	Shadow Secretary of State for Energy and Climate Change (2011–2015)	1997	Nick Fletcher	Conservative
Labour	Martin Whitfield	East Lothian		2017	Kenny MacAskill	SNP
Labour	Vernon Coaker	Gedling	Shadow Secretary of State for Northern Ireland (2015–2016)	1997	Tom Randall	Conservative
Labour	Paul Sweeney	Glasgow North East	Shadow Minister for Scotland	2017	Anne McLaughlin	SNP
Labour	Melanie Onn	Great Grimsby	Shadow Minister for Housing (2017–2019)	2015	Lia Nici	Conservative
Labour	Liz McInnes	Heywood and Middleton	Shadow Foreign Office Minister	2014	Chris Clarkson	Conservative
Labour	Ruth George	High Peak		2017	Robert Largan	Conservative
Labour	Graham Jones	Hyndburn		2010	Sara Britcliffe	Conservative
Labour	Sandy Martin	Ipswich	Shadow Minister for Waste & Recycling	2017	Tom Hunt	Conservative
Labour	John Grogan	Keighley		2017	Robbie Moore	Conservative
Labour	Emma Dent Coad	Kensington		2017	Felicity Buchan	Conservative
Labour	Lesley Laird	Kirkcaldy and Cowdenbeath	Shadow Secretary of State for Scotland	2017	Neale Hanvey (Note: Suspended at time of election)	SNP
Labour	Joanne Platt	Leigh	Shadow Cabinet Office Minister	2017	James Grundy	Conservative
Labour	Karen Lee	Lincoln	Shadow Minister for Fire and Rescue Services	2017	Karl McCartney	Conservative
Labour	Danielle Rowley	Midlothian	Shadow Minister for Climate Justice and Green Jobs	2017	Owen Thompson	SNP
Labour	Laura Pidcock	North West Durham	Shadow Secretary of State for Employment Rights	2017	Richard Holden	Conservative
Labour	Lisa Forbes	Peterborough		2019	Paul Bristow	Conservative
Labour	Anna Turley	Redcar	Chair of the Co-operative Party	2015	Jacob Young	Conservative
Labour	Gerard Killen	Rutherglen and Hamilton West		2017	Margaret Ferrier	SNP
Labour	Nic Dakin	Scunthorpe	Shadow Minister for Schools (2015–2016)	2010	Holly Mumby-Croft	Conservative
Labour	Phil Wilson	Sedgefield		2007	Paul Howell	Conservative
Labour	Paul Williams	Stockton South		2017	Matt Vickers	Conservative
Labour	Gareth Snell	Stoke-on-Trent Central		2017	Jo Gideon	Conservative
Labour	Ruth Smeeth	Stoke-on-Trent North		2015	Jonathan Gullis	Conservative
Labour	David Drew	Stroud	Shadow Farming and Rural Communities Minister	2017	Siobhan Baillie	Conservative
Labour	Chris Ruane	Vale of Clwyd		2017	James Davies	Conservative
Labour	Mary Creagh	Wakefield	Chair of the Environmental Audit Select Committee	2005	Imran Ahmad Khan	Conservative
Labour	Faisal Rashid	Warrington South		2017	Andy Carter	Conservative
Labour	Emma Reynolds	Wolverhampton North East	Shadow Secretary of State for Communities and Local Government (2015)	2010	Jane Stevenson	Conservative
Labour	Eleanor Smith	Wolverhampton South West		2017	Stuart Anderson	Conservative
Labour	Sue Hayman	Workington	Shadow Secretary of State for Environment, Food and Rural Affairs (2017–2019)	2015	Mark Jenkinson	Conservative
Conservative	Kirstene Hair	Angus		2017	Dave Doogan	SNP
Conservative	Paul Masterton	East Renfrewshire		2017	Kirsten Oswald	SNP
Conservative	Colin Clark	Gordon	Parliamentary Under-Secretary of State for Scotland	2017	Richard Thomson	SNP
Conservative	Luke Graham	Ochil and South Perthshire		2017	John Nicolson	SNP
Conservative	Zac Goldsmith	Richmond Park	Minister of State for Environment and International Development	2017	Sarah Olney	Liberal Democrats
Conservative	Anne Main	St Albans		2005	Daisy Cooper	Liberal Democrats
Conservative	Stephen Kerr	Stirling		2017	Alyn Smith	SNP
Independent	Dominic Grieve	Beaconsfield	Chair of the Intelligence and Security Committee	1997	Joy Morrissey	Conservative
Independent	Roger Godsiff	Birmingham Hall Green		1992	Tahir Ali	Labour
Independent	Ivan Lewis	Bury South	Shadow Secretary of State for Northern Ireland (2013–2015)	1997	Christian Wakeford	Conservative
Independent	Chris Williamson	Derby North	Shadow Minister for Fire and Emergency Services (2017–2018)	2017	Amanda Solloway	Conservative
Independent	Anne Milton	Guildford	Minister of State for Skills and Apprenticeships (2017–2019)	2005	Angela Richardson	Conservative
Independent	Gavin Shuker	Luton South		2010	Rachel Hopkins	Labour
Independent	David Gauke	South West Hertfordshire	Secretary of State for Justice (2018–2019)	2005	Gagan Mohindra	Conservative
Liberal Democrats	Philip Lee	Bracknell, contesting Wokingham	Liberal Democrat Spokesperson for Justice	2010	John Redwood	Conservative hold
Liberal Democrats	Jane Dodds	Brecon and Radnorshire	Liberal Democrat Spokesperson for Food and Rural Affairs & Leader of the Welsh Liberal Democrats	2019	Fay Jones	Conservative
Liberal Democrats	Tom Brake	Carshalton and Wallington	Liberal Democrat Spokesman for the Duchy of Lancaster	1997	Elliot Colburn	Conservative
Liberal Democrats	Stephen Lloyd	Eastbourne	Liberal Democrat Spokesperson for Work and Pensions (2017–2018)	2017	Caroline Ansell	Conservative
Liberal Democrats	Jo Swinson	East Dunbartonshire	Leader of the Liberal Democrats	2017	Amy Callaghan	SNP
Liberal Democrats	Sam Gyimah	East Surrey, contesting Kensington	Liberal Democrat Spokesperson for Business, Energy and Industrial Strategy	2010	see Labour loss to Felicity Buchan above	
Liberal Democrats	Antoinette Sandbach	Eddisbury		2015	Edward Timpson	Conservative
Liberal Democrats	Luciana Berger	Liverpool Wavertree, contesting Finchley and Golders Green	Liberal Democrat Spokesperson for Health, Wellbeing and Social Care	2015	Mike Freer	Conservative hold
Liberal Democrats	Angela Smith	Penistone and Stocksbridge, contesting Altrincham and Sale West	Liberal Democrat Spokesperson for International Development (2019)	2005	Graham Brady	Conservative hold
Liberal Democrats	Chuka Umunna	Streatham, contesting Cities of London and Westminster	Liberal Democrat Spokesman for Foreign and Commonwealth Affairs	2010	Nickie Aiken	Conservative hold
Liberal Democrats	Sarah Wollaston	Totnes	Chair of the Liaison Committee and Heath Select Committee	2010	Anthony Mangnall	Conservative
The Independent Group	Anna Soubry	Broxtowe	Leader of the Independent Group for Change	2010	Darren Henry	Conservative
The Independent Group	Mike Gapes	Ilford South		1992	Sam Tarry	Labour
The Independent Group	Chris Leslie	Nottingham East	Shadow Chancellor of the Exchequer (2015)	2010	Nadia Whittome	Labour
DUP	Nigel Dodds	Belfast North	Leader of the Democratic Unionist Party in the House of Commons	2001	John Finucane	Sinn Féin
DUP	Emma Little-Pengelly	Belfast South		2017	Claire Hanna	SDLP
Birkenhead Social Justice	Frank Field	Birkenhead	Chair of the Work and Pensions Select Committee (2015–2019)	1979	Mick Whitley	Labour
Sinn Féin	Elisha McCallion	Foyle		2017	Colum Eastwood	SDLP
SNP	Stephen Gethins	North East Fife	SNP Westminster Spokesperson for International Affairs and Europe	2015	Wendy Chamberlain	Liberal Democrats

== Open seats changing hands ==
Party of incumbent	Candidate chosen by their party (of 2017)	Incumbent retiring from the House	Constituency	Defeated by	Party
Conservative	Douglas Lumsden	Ross Thomson	Aberdeen South	Stephen Flynn	SNP
Labour	Natalie Fleet	Gloria De Piero	Ashfield	Lee Anderson	Conservative
Conservative	Martin Dowey	Bill Grant	Ayr, Carrick and Cumnock	Allan Dorans	SNP
Independent	Chris Altree (Labour)	John Woodcock (Note: Elected as Labour)	Barrow and Furness	Simon Fell	Conservative
Labour	Keir Morrison	John Mann	Bassetlaw	Brendan Clarke-Smith	Conservative
Labour	Susan Dungworth	Ronnie Campbell	Blyth Valley	Ian Levy	Conservative
Independent	Melanie Dudley (Labour)	Ian Austin (Note: Elected as Labour)	Dudley North	Marco Longhi	Conservative
Independent	—N/a (Note: Hermon was an Ulster Unionist Party MP between 2001 and February 2010, and stood as an "independent unionist" candidate in the 2010, 2015, and 2017 elections. The UUP candidate was Alan Chambers, himself a former independent unionist)	Sylvia Hermon	North Down	Stephen Farry	Alliance
Labour	Carl Greatbatch	Paul Farrelly	Newcastle-under-Lyme	Aaron Bell	Conservative
Liberal Democrats	Karen Ward	Norman Lamb	North Norfolk	Duncan Baker	Conservative
Labour	Francyne Johnson	Angela Smith	Penistone and Stocksbridge	Miriam Cates	Conservative
Independent	Will Sweet (Conservative)	Justine Greening (Note: Elected as Conservative)	Putney	Fleur Anderson	Labour
Labour	Sophie Wilson	Kevin Barron	Rother Valley	Alexander Stafford	Conservative
Labour	Ibrahim Dogus	Tom Watson	West Bromwich East	Nicola Richards	Conservative
Labour	James Cunningham	Adrian Bailey	West Bromwich West	Shaun Bailey	Conservative
Labour	Mary Wimbury	Ian Lucas	Wrexham	Sarah Atherton	Conservative
Labour	Mary Roberts	Albert Owen	Ynys Môn	Virginia Crosbie	Conservative

Being 17 of the 79, this list is 21.5% of those which changed hands.

Footnotes
