= Results breakdown of the 2017 United Kingdom general election =

2017 United Kingdom general election
← 2015	8 June 2017	2019 →
- All 650 seats in the House of Commons of the United Kingdom; 326 seats needed for a majority
- Turnout: 68.7%
Party	Leader	Vote %	Seats	+/–
Conservative	Theresa May	42.4%	317	−13
Labour	Jeremy Corbyn	40.0%	262	+30
SNP	Nicola Sturgeon	3.0%	35	−21
Liberal Democrats	Tim Farron	7.4%	12	+4
DUP	Arlene Foster	0.9%	10	+2
Sinn Féin	Gerry Adams	0.8%	7	+3
Plaid Cymru	Leanne Wood	0.5%	4	+1
Green	Jonathan Bartley; Caroline Lucas	1.6%	1	0
This lists parties that won seats. See the complete results below.
Prime Minister before	Prime Minister after
Theresa May; Conservative	Theresa May; Conservative

This is the results breakdown of the 2017 general election.

== Vote shares ==
Change in vote share, by default order of total seats won in 2017
Party	% votes won in 2015	% votes won in 2017	∆% (i.e. change)
Conservative Party	36.8	42.4	+5.5
Labour Party	30.5	40.0	+9.6
Scottish National Party	4.7	3.0	−1.7
Liberal Democrats	7.9	7.4	−0.5
Green Party	3.8	1.6	−2.2
UKIP	12.7	1.8	−10.9
Other	3.6	3.8	+0.2
Total %	100.0	100.0	–

A post-election analysis of Lord Ashcroft of inter-party swing (between specific parties):

Poll: Expressed voting choice in 2017 of electors who say they voted in 2015
Party	New choice of party of sample-polled previous voters						
Party	Conservative	Labour	LD	SNP	UKIP	Green	Other
Conservative	82%	10%	5%	–	1%	1%	1%
Labour	9%	83%	5%	1%	1%	1%	–
Liberal Democrats	16%	30%	50%	1%	–	2%	1%
SNP	6%	12%	2%	80%	–	–	–
UKIP	57%	18%	3%	–	19%	2%	1%

== Seats which changed hands ==
=== Conservative to Labour ===
1. Battersea
2. Bedford
3. Brighton Kemptown
4. Bristol North West
5. Bury North
6. Canterbury
7. Cardiff North
8. Colne Valley
9. Crewe and Nantwich
10. Croydon Central
11. Derby North
12. Enfield Southgate
13. Gower
14. High Peak
15. Ipswich
16. Keighley
17. Kensington
18. Lincoln
19. Peterborough
20. Plymouth Sutton and Devonport
21. Portsmouth South
22. Reading East
23. Stockton South
24. Stroud
25. Vale of Clwyd
26. Warrington South
27. Warwick and Leamington
28. Weaver Vale

=== SNP to Conservative ===
1. Aberdeen South
2. Aberdeenshire West & Kincardine
3. Angus
4. Ayr, Carrick and Cumnock
5. Banff and Buchan
6. Berwickshire, Roxburgh and Selkirk
7. Dumfries and Galloway
8. Gordon
9. Moray
10. Ochil and South Perthshire
11. Renfrewshire East
12. Stirling

=== SNP to Labour ===
1. Coatbridge, Chryston and Bellshill
2. East Lothian
3. Glasgow North East
4. Kirkcaldy and Cowdenbeath
5. Midlothian
6. Rutherglen and Hamilton West

=== Labour to Conservative ===
1. Copeland (Note: The seat had already been gained at a by-election in February. Gains at a general election are normally contrasted to the previous general election, ignoring by-elections in between.)
2. Derbyshire North East
3. Mansfield
4. Middlesbrough South and Cleveland East
5. Stoke-on-Trent South
6. Walsall North

=== Conservative to Liberal Democrat ===
1. Bath
2. Eastbourne
3. Kingston and Surbiton
4. Oxford West and Abingdon
5. Twickenham

=== SNP to Liberal Democrat ===
1. Caithness, Sutherland and Easter Ross
2. Dunbartonshire East
3. Edinburgh West

=== Liberal Democrat to Labour ===
1. Leeds North West
2. Sheffield Hallam

=== SDLP to Sinn Féin ===
1. Foyle
2. South Down

=== Liberal Democrat to Conservative ===
1. Southport

=== UKIP to Conservative ===
1. Clacton

=== Ulster Unionist to Sinn Féin ===
1. Fermanagh and South Tyrone

=== SDLP to Democratic Unionist ===
1. Belfast South

=== Ulster Unionist to Democratic Unionist ===
1. South Antrim

=== Liberal Democrat to Plaid Cymru ===
1. Ceredigion

== England ==
Party	Seats				Votes		
Party	Total	Gained	Lost	Net	Total	%	Change (%)
Conservative (Note: Seat figure includes Speaker of the House of Commons John Bercow)	297	8	30	−22	12,376,530	45.6	+4.6
Labour	227	27	6	+21	11,386,624	41.9	+10.3
Liberal Democrats	8	5	3	+2	2,121,672	7.8	−0.4
Green	1	0	0	0	506,905	1.9	−2.3
UKIP	0	0	1	−1	557,174	2.1	−12.1
Others	0	0	0	0	210,321	0.8	+0.6
Total	533				27,159,226	Turnout	69.1%

== Northern Ireland ==
Party	Seats				Votes		
Party	Total	Gained	Lost	Net	Total	%	Change (%)
DUP	10	2	0	+2	292,316	36.0	+10.3
Sinn Féin	7	3	0	+3	238,915	29.4	+4.9
SDLP	0	0	3	−3	95,419	11.7	−2.2
UUP	0	0	2	−2	83,280	10.3	−5.8
Alliance	0	0	0	0	64,553	7.9	−0.6
Green (NI)	0	0	0	0	7,452	0.9	−0.0
TUV	0	0	0	0	3,282	0.4	−1.9
Others	1	0	0	0	26,966	3.3	−1.8
Total	18				812,183	Turnout	65.4%

== Scotland ==
Party	Seats				Votes		
Party	Total	Gained	Lost	Net	Total	%	Change (%)
SNP	35	0	21	−21	977,569	36.9	−13.1
Conservative	13	12	0	+12	757,949	28.6	+13.7
Labour	7	6	0	+6	717,007	27.1	+2.8
Liberal Democrats	4	3	0	+3	179,061	6.8	−0.8
Green	0	0	0	0	5,886	0.2	−1.1
UKIP	0	0	0	0	5,302	0.2	−1.4
Others	0	0	0	0	6,920	0.3	+0.2
Total	59				2,649,695	Turnout	66.4%

== Wales ==
Party	Seats				Votes		
Party	Total	Gained	Lost	Net	Total	%	Change (%)
Labour	28	3	0	+3	771,354	48.9	+12.1
Conservative	8	0	3	−3	528,839	33.6	+6.3
Plaid Cymru	4	1	0	+1	164,466	10.4	−1.7
Liberal Democrats	0	0	1	−1	71,039	4.5	−2.0
UKIP	0	0	0	0	31,376	2.0	−11.6
Green	0	0	0	0	5,128	0.3	−2.2
Others	0	0	0	0	3,612	0.2	−0.1
Total	40				1,575,814	Turnout	68.6%
