= Electoral history of Alex Salmond =

Elections featuring First Minister of Scotland

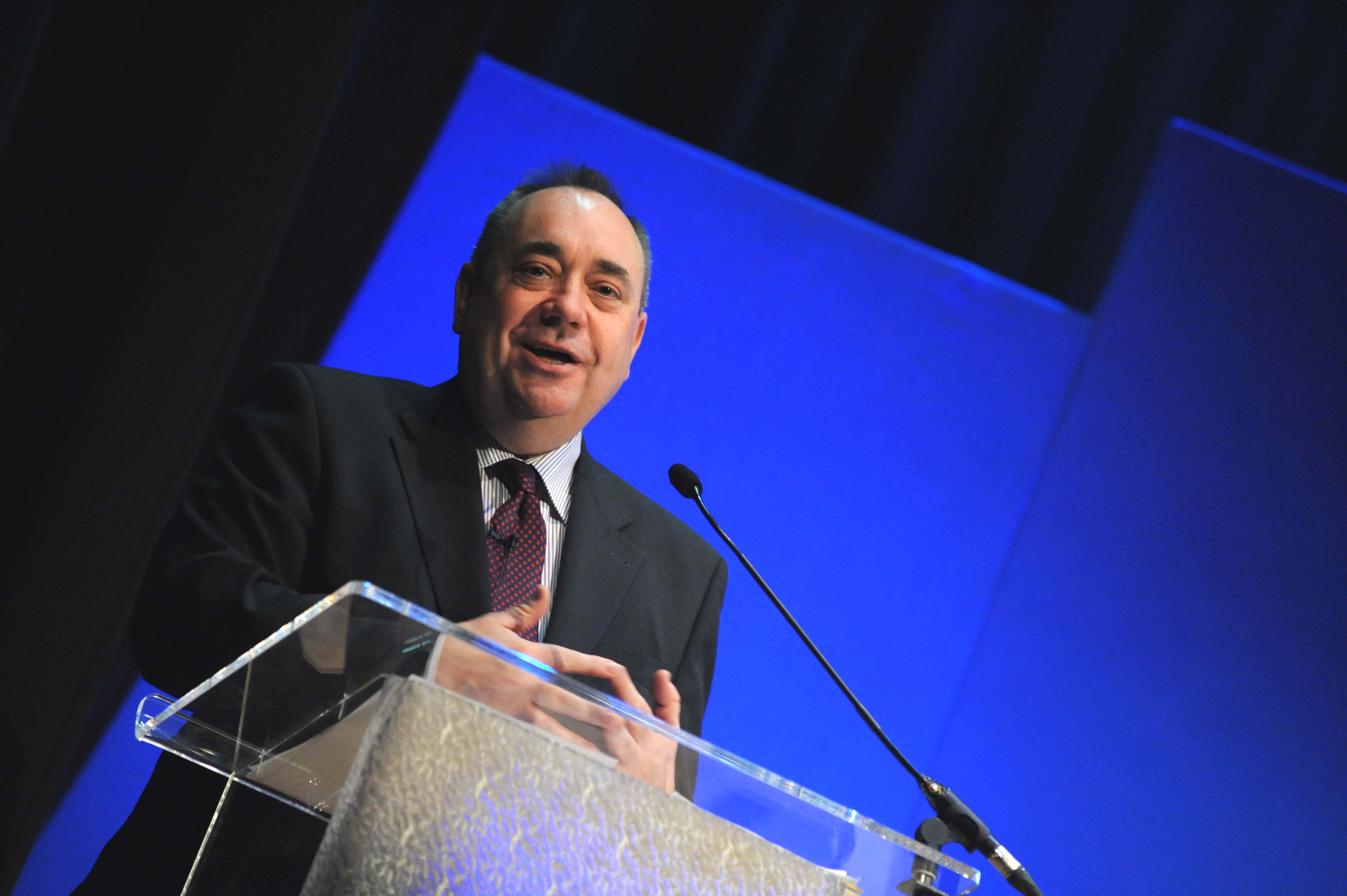
Alex Salmond speaking at Skye

This is a summary of the electoral history of Alex Salmond, the former First Minister of Scotland from 2007 to 2014 and Leader of the Scottish National Party from 2004 to 2014 and 1990 to 2001, and a Member of the Scottish Parliament and a Member of the UK Parliament for various constituencies since 1987.

== UK Parliamentary elections ==
=== 1987 UK Parliament election ===
General election 1987: Banff and Buchan
Party	Candidate	Votes	%	±%
SNP	Alex Salmond	19,462	44.3	+6.9
Conservative	Albert McQuarrie	17,021	38.7	−1.0
SDP	George Burness	4,211	9.6	−5.4
Labour	James Livie	3,281	7.5	−0.3
Majority		2,441	5.6	N/A
Turnout		43,975	70.8	+3.8
SNP gain from Conservative		Swing	+3.9	

=== 1992 UK Parliament election ===
General election 1992: Banff and Buchan
Party	Candidate	Votes	%	±%
SNP	Alex Salmond	21,954	47.5	+3.2
Conservative	Sandy Manson	17,846	38.6	−0.1
Labour	Brian Balcombe	3,803	8.2	+0.7
Liberal Democrats	Rhona Kemp	2,588	5.6	−4.0
Majority		4,108	8.9	+3.3
Turnout		46,191	71.2	+0.4
SNP hold		Swing	+1.7	

=== 1997 UK Parliament election ===
General election 1997: Banff and Buchan
Party	Candidate	Votes	%	±%
SNP	Alex Salmond	22,409	55.8	+4.9
Conservative	William Frain-Bell	9,564	23.8	−10.9
Labour	Megan Harris	4,747	11.8	+3.2
Liberal Democrats	Neil Fletcher	2,398	6.0	+0.1
Referendum	Alan Buchan	1,060	2.6	New
Majority		12,845	32.0	+23.1
Turnout		40,178	68.7	−2.5
SNP hold		Swing	+11.5	

=== 2001 UK Parliament election ===
General election 2001: Banff and Buchan
Party	Candidate	Votes	%	±%
SNP	Alex Salmond	16,710	54.2	−1.6
Conservative	Sandy Wallace	6,207	20.1	−3.7
Labour	Ted Harris	4,363	14.2	+2.4
Liberal Democrats	Douglas Herbison	2,769	9.0	+3.0
Scottish Socialist	Alice Rowan	447	1.5	New
UKIP	Eric Davidson	310	1.0	New
Majority		10,503	34.1	+2.1
Turnout		30,806	54.4	−14.3
SNP hold		Swing	+1.1	

=== 2005 UK Parliament election ===
General election 2005: Banff and Buchan
Party	Candidate	Votes	%	±%
SNP	Alex Salmond	19,044	51.2	+2.3
Conservative	Sandy Wallace	7,207	19.4	−2.1
Liberal Democrats	Eleanor Anderson	4,952	13.3	−0.6
Labour	Rami Okasha	4,476	12.0	−1.5
Christian Vote	Victor Ross	683	1.8	New
UKIP	Kathleen Kemp	442	1.2	+0.3
Scottish Socialist	Steve Will	412	1.1	−0.3
Majority		11,837	31.8	−2.3
Turnout		37,216	56.6	+2.2
SNP hold		Swing	−1.1	

=== 2015 UK Parliament election ===
General election 2015: Gordon
Party	Candidate	Votes	%	±%
SNP	Alex Salmond	27,717	47.7	+25.5
Liberal Democrats	Christine Jardine	19,030	32.7	−3.3
Conservative	Colin Clark	6,807	11.7	−7.0
Labour	Braden Davy	3,441	5.9	−14.2
UKIP	Emily Santos	1,166	2.0	New
Majority		8,687	15.0	N/A
Turnout		58,161	73.3	+6.9
SNP gain from Liberal Democrats		Swing	+14.4	

=== 2017 UK Parliament election ===
General election 2017: Gordon
Party	Candidate	Votes	%	±%
Conservative	Colin Clark	21,861	40.7	+29.0
SNP	Alex Salmond	19,254	35.9	−11.8
Labour	Kirsten Muat	6,340	11.8	+5.9
Liberal Democrats	David Evans	6,230	11.6	−21.1
Majority		2,607	4.8	N/A
Turnout		53,740	68.4	−4.9
Conservative gain from SNP		Swing	+20.4	

== Scottish Parliamentary elections ==
=== 1999 Scottish Parliament election ===
1999 Scottish Parliament election: Banff and Buchan
Party	Candidate	Votes	%	±%
SNP	Alex Salmond	16,695	52.6	N/A
Conservative	David Davidson	5,403	17.0	N/A
Liberal Democrats	Maitland Mackie	5,315	16.8	N/A
Labour	Megan Harris	4,321	13.6	N/A
Majority		11,292	35.6	N/A
Turnout		31,734		N/A
SNP win (new seat)				

=== 2007 Scottish Parliament election ===
2007 Scottish Parliament election: Gordon
Party	Candidate	Votes	%	±%
SNP	Alex Salmond	14,650	41.4	+18.8
Liberal Democrats	Nora Radcliffe	12,588	35.6	−2.5
Conservative	Nanette Milne	5,348	15.1	−8.8
Labour	Neil Cardwell	2,276	6.4	−3.9
Independent	Donald Marr	199	0.6	N/A
Independent	Dave Mathers	185	0.5	N/A
Scottish Enterprise	Bob Ingram	117	0.3	N/A
Majority		2,062	5.8	N/A
Turnout		35,363	54.1	+6.6
SNP gain from Liberal Democrats		Swing	+10.7	

=== 2011 Scottish Parliament election ===
2011 Scottish Parliament election: Aberdeenshire East
Party	Candidate	Votes	%	±%
SNP	Alex Salmond	19,533	64.5	+19.8
Liberal Democrats	Alison McInnes	4,238	14.0	−16.6
Conservative	Geordie Stuart	4,211	13.9	−1.9
Labour	Peter Smyth	2,304	7.6	−0.5
Majority		15,295	50.5	N/A
Turnout		30,286		N/A
SNP win (new seat)				
