= Forfar and District (ward) =

- Angus Council
- Boundary of Forfar and District in Angus from 2017.
- Electorate: 12,325

Current ward
- Created: 2007
- Councillor: Linda Clark (SNP)
- Councillor: Ross Greig (Conservative)
- Councillor: Lynne Devine (SNP)
- Councillor: Ian McLaren (Independent)

Forfar and District is one of the eight wards used to elect members of the Angus Council. It elects four Councillors.

== Councillors ==
Election	Councillors			
2007	Colin Brown (Ind.)	Glennis Middleton (SNP)	William Middleton (SNP)	John Rymer (Conservative)
2012	Colin Brown (Ind.)	Glennis Middleton (SNP)	Lynne Devine (SNP)	Ian McLaren (Ind.)
2017	Colin Brown (Ind.)	Braden Davy (Conservative)	Lynne Devine (SNP)	Ian McLaren (Ind.)
2022	Linda Clark (SNP)	Ross Greig (Conservative)	Lynne Devine (SNP)	Ian McLaren (Ind.)

== Election results ==
=== 2022 election ===
Forfar and District – 4 seats
Party	Candidate	FPv%	Count							
Party	Candidate	FPv%	1	2	3	4	5	6	7	8
SNP	Linda Clark	23.4	1,270							
Conservative	Ross Greig	21.4	1,158							
Independent	Ian McLaren (incumbent)	16.0	869	872	893	925	959	961	1,082	1,709
SNP	Lynne Devine (incumbent)	14.9	810	973	976	984	1,098			
Independent	Colin Brown (incumbent)	12.9	698	702	716	727	754	756	833	
Labour	Ed McAdam	5.5	298	300	309	334	366	368		
Green	Marley Hunter	4.2	228	235	237	249				
Liberal Democrats	Samuel Struth	1.7	90	91	99					
Electorate: 12,325 Valid: 5,421 Spoilt: 107 Quota: 1,085 Turnout: 44.9%

=== 2017 election ===
2017 Angus Council election

Forfar and District - 4 seats
Party	Candidate	FPv%	Count						
Party	Candidate	FPv%	1	2	3	4	5	6	7
Conservative	Braden Davy	24.14%	1,333						
Independent	Colin Brown (incumbent)	19.66%	1,086	1,144					
SNP	Lynne Devine (incumbent)	17.64%	974	978	980	997	1,025	1,086	1,105
Independent	Ian McLaren (incumbent)	14.63%	808	861	883	920	990	1,253	
SNP	Glennis Middleton (incumbent)	10.47%	578	581	582	589	597	644	656
Independent	Ian Whyte	7.82%	432	452	459	476	516		
Labour	Ed McAdam	3.58%	198	213	214	250			
Liberal Democrats	Glen Barclay	2.06%	114	137	138				
Electorate: TBC Valid: 5,523 Spoilt: 97 Quota: 1,105 Turnout: 47.1%

=== 2012 election ===
2012 Angus Council election

Forfar and District - 4 seats
Party	Candidate	FPv%	Count				
Party	Candidate	FPv%	1	2	3	4	5
SNP	Lynne Devine	21.8%	986				
SNP	Glennis Middleton (incumbent)	20.52%	928				
Independent	Ian McLaren	18.59%	841	855.5	859.5	890.2	972
Independent	Colin Brown (incumbent)	17.4%	787	798.3	802.4	820.9	1,050.4
Conservative	John Rymer (incumbent)	10.78%	487	490.2	491.1	526.6	546.1
Independent	Charlie Brown	7.89%	357	367	369.3	383.9	
Liberal Democrats	Avril Simpson	3.03%	137	141.4	142.6		
Electorate: 11,218 Valid: 4,523 Spoilt: 53 Quota: 905 Turnout: 4,578 (40.32%)

=== 2007 election ===
2007 Angus Council election

2007 Council election: Forfar and District
Party	Candidate	FPv%	%	Seat	Count
Independent	Colin Brown	1,782	30.1	1	1
SNP	Glennis Middleton	1,111	18.8	2	3
SNP	William Middleton	1,053	17.8	3	5
Conservative	John Rymer	878	14.8	4	7
Labour	Mitch Cameron	526	8.9		
Liberal Democrats	Avril Simpson	495	8.4		
Independent	John Phillip	76	1.3		
