= Phil Boswell =

Scottish politician (born 1963)

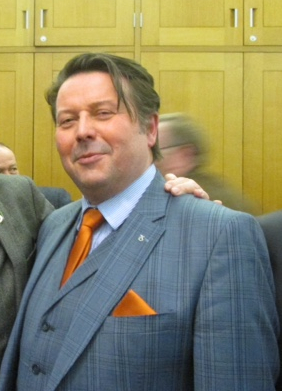
- Boswell in 2016

Member of Parliament for Coatbridge, Chryston and Bellshill
- In office 8 May 2015 – 9 June 2017
- Preceded by: Tom Clarke
- Succeeded by: Hugh Gaffney

Personal details
- Born: 23 July 1963 (age 63) Bellshill, Scotland
- Party: Scottish National Party
- Education: Glasgow Caledonian University; Reading University
- Website: Official website

Philip John Boswell (born 23 July 1963) is a Scottish National Party (SNP) politician who served as Member of Parliament (MP) for Coatbridge, Chryston and Bellshill from 2015 to 2017.

== Early life and career ==
Phil Boswell was born in Bellshill, raised in Coatbridge and worked there in the construction Industry and then for a brief time as a policeman in Kilmarnock. Boswell then found work internationally in the construction industry before transferring to the oil industry in Qatar, as a quantity surveyor and contracts engineer. He spent over 15 years in the oil and gas industry, with work taking him to Hong Kong, Malaysia, Egypt, USA, Qatar and the Falklands before returning to Scotland with BP in Aberdeen.

He now works in the Asia-Pacific region as specialist Oil & Gas and Construction Contracts Manager, QS and Disputes Resolution expert.

== Political career ==
Boswell was elected as MP for Coatbridge, Chryston and Bellshill at the 2015 United Kingdom general election.

He was appointed to the Public Accounts Committee where he served under the Chairmanship of Dame Meg Hillier until dissolution of Parliament in April 2017. Boswell served on all Energy Bill Committees whilst at Westminster and was Patron of Chris's House, the Suicide Charity based in Wishaw, North Lanarkshire.

Boswell's voting record at Westminster shows that he voted for; the removal of hereditary peers, proportional representation and for UK to remain within the EU. He never voted to reduce local Government funding and spoke extensively on Energy as well as being a co-author of the definitive paper on Carbon Capture and Storage in 2016, titled LOWEST COST DECARBONISATION FOR THE UK: THE CRITICAL ROLE OF CCS, researched, prepared and published for the parliamentary advisory group along with other industry experts such as Professor Stuart Haszledine and under the Chairmanship of Lord Oxburgh.

In May 2016 Boswell was part of the SNP delegation that visited NATO Headquarters in Brussels and SHAPE Headquarters in Mons all paid for by the donor US Mission to NATO.

In December 2015, though perfectly legal, Boswell was criticised for having previously received an £18,000 interest-free loan from US energy company Phillips 66 while working for them as a contracts manager. Earlier in 2015, Boswell had tabled a motion in the House of Commons, calling for Chancellor George Osborne to close the "Mayfair tax loophole" tax avoidance scheme. An SNP spokesperson stated that Boswell had always declared his interests, and was committed to ending tax avoidance schemes.

In January 2016 it was announced that Boswell would be investigated by the Parliamentary Commissioner for Standards over the claim that he did not properly record his directorship of a company (that had long since ceased trading) in the Commons Register of Members' Interests, thus breaching parliamentary procedure. He was registered with Companies House as the sole director of Boswell and Johnston Ltd. On 30 March 2016 it was reported that this complaint had been upheld, however the Standards Commissioner stated that Mr Boswell had made a "genuine mistake" and that she did not think this was done in an attempt to conceal his financial interests as zero funds were involved.

In May 2016 Boswell's application for a £555 claimed on parliamentary expenses against the costs of promotional videos was rejected, this followed the Independent Parliamentary Standards Association finding that they were not eligible because they did not relate to parliamentary activities.

The SNP and Boswell lost Coatbridge, Chryston and Bellshill to Labour candidate Hugh Gaffney at the 2017 United Kingdom general election by 1,586 votes.

Parliament of the United Kingdom
Preceded by Tom Clarke	Member of Parliament for Coatbridge, Chryston and Bellshill; 2015–2017	Succeeded by Hugh Gaffney
