= Frank McNally (politician) =

Scottish politician

Frank McNally MP
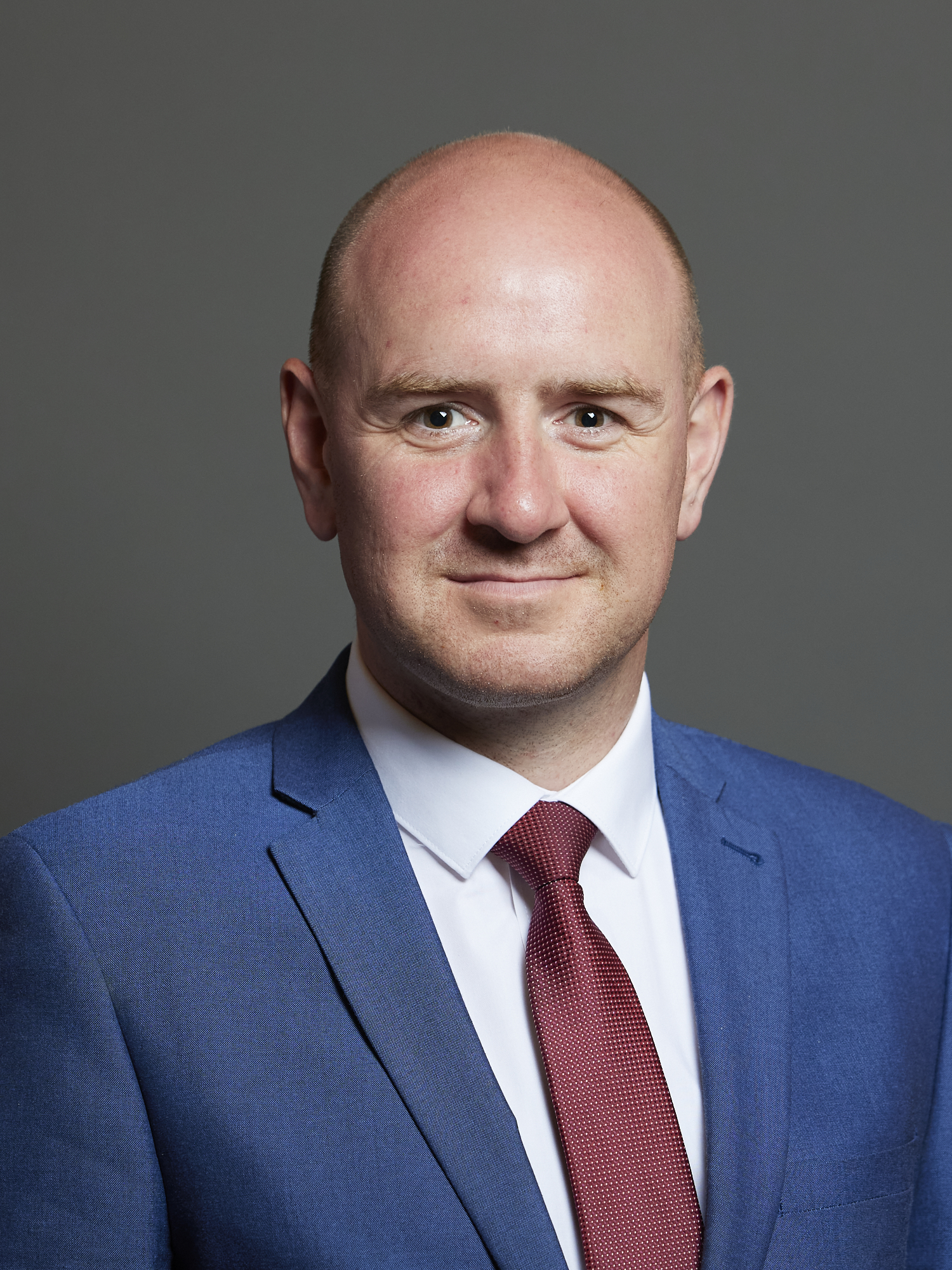
- Official portrait, 2024

Member of Parliament for Coatbridge and Bellshill
- Incumbent
- Assumed office 4 July 2024
- Preceded by: Steven Bonnar
- Majority: 6,344 (16.3%)

Personal details
- Born: Francis Joseph McNally
- Party: Labour

Francis Joseph McNally (born 24 January 1988) is a British Labour Party politician who has been the Member of Parliament for Coatbridge and Bellshill since 2024. He gained the seat from Steven Bonnar of the Scottish National Party.

== Early life and education ==
McNally is a lifelong resident of Bellshill. He attended St. Gerard’s Primary School and Cardinal Newman High School in the town. He studied at Strathclyde University in Glasgow, and graduated in 2009.

== Political career ==
He served as a Labour councillor for Mossend and Holytown ward on North Lanarkshire Council since May 2012. He was appointed the Education Convener in March 2016. He also was a Parliamentary Assistant to Mark Griffin.

McNally is named by Scottish voluntary sector magazine Third Force News as the founder of North Lanarkshire Council's school meals programme Club 365 "to support under-privileged children and families in the region."

He was re-elected in 2017 and 2022. At 28, he became the youngest chair of a major service in Scotland.

== Member of Parliament ==
McNally made his maiden speech on 24 July 2024, citing the history of mining and steel in his constituency and paying tribute to his predecessors. Having been appointed to the Procedure Committee within the early months of the Parliament, he was elected to the Work and Pensions Select Committee in December 2024, with responsibility for scrutinising the Department for Work and Pensions. He was appointed to the UK-EU Parliamentary Partnership Assembly in January 2025. Frank was appointed as Parliamentary Private Secretary to the Scotland Office and Secretary of State, Douglas Alexander, in the September 2025 UK Government reshuffle.
