= Steven Bonnar =

Scottish National Party politician

Steven Bonnar MSP
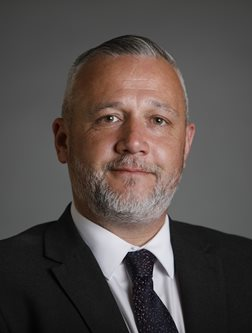
- Official portrait, 2026

SNP Spokesperson for Environment, Farming, Agriculture and Rural Affairs in the House of Commons
- In office 4 September 2023 – 5 July 2024
- Leader: Stephen Flynn
- Preceded by: Patricia Gibson
- Succeeded by: Position abolished

Member of Parliament for Coatbridge, Chryston and Bellshill
- In office 12 December 2019 – 30 May 2024
- Preceded by: Hugh Gaffney
- Succeeded by: Frank McNally (Coatbridge and Bellshill)

Member of the Scottish Parliament for Uddingston and Bellshill
- Incumbent
- Assumed office 7 May 2026
- Preceded by: Stephanie Callaghan
- Majority: 3,584 (12.4%)

Councillor for Thorniewood, North Lanarkshire
- In office 2015–2020

Personal details
- Born: 27 August 1981 (age 44)
- Party: Scottish National Party

Steven Bonnar (born 27 August 1981) is a Scottish National Party politician who has served as a Member of the Scottish Parliament for Uddingston and Bellshill since May 2026. He was previously a Member of Parliament (MP) for Coatbridge, Chryston and Bellshill from 2019 until the seat's abolition in 2024. He has been SNP Environment, Farming, Agriculture and Rural Affairs spokesperson since 2023.

Raised in North Lanarkshire, Bonnar served as an SNP councillor in the Thorniewood ward of North Lanarkshire from 2015 to 2020. He defeated the incumbent Labour MP Hugh Gaffney at the 2019 general election. He later resigned from his councillor role.

== Political career ==
Following the 2014 Scottish independence referendum, Bonnar decided to run to be a councillor in his local ward of Thorniewood. The previous SNP councillor, Duncan McShannon, had become ill and had to vacate the seat after several months of sickness. On 9 July 2015, Bonnar won the by-election and was duly elected to serve as councillor for Thorniewood ward for North Lanarkshire Council. On 4 May 2017, Bonnar was again elected. During his time as a councillor, Bonnar was a witness for former SNP councillor Julie McAnulty in a successful defamation case in 2018, after she had been falsely accused by a party activist of making racist comments in a car trip with Bonnar. McAnulty was awarded £40,000 in damages.

Bonnar stood for election for the Scottish National Party to become MP for Coatbridge, Chryston and Bellshill at the 2019 general election. He became the third different MP in just over four years to represent the constituency, taking the seat from incumbent Labour MP Hugh Gaffney. Bonnar received 22,680 votes, with a majority of 5,624 to Gaffney's 17,056 votes. The seat was one of six in Scotland gained from Labour by the SNP during the election. When swearing in to the House of Commons, he crossed his fingers to protest having to affirm allegiance to the monarchy. In February 2020, Bonnar made the decision to step down from his councillor role at North Lanarkshire council to allow a by-election to be called in Thorniewood in May 2020, However, due to the COVID-19 pandemic, it was delayed until March 2021, having originally being scheduled for November 2020 (also due to COVID-19).

In the 2024 United Kingdom general election, he was defeated by Labour candidate Frank McNally. In the 2026 Scottish Parliament election, he will be a candidate in Uddingston and Bellshill.

== Controversies ==
=== Altercation ===
In April 2020, a video emerged on a Facebook group of Bonnar arguing with one of his neighbours. Bonnar had hung a Celtic FC towel across one of his windows on the day that Celtic were declared Scottish Premiership winners during the COVID-19 pandemic, and was confronted by a neighbour. In the video, the two engage in a verbal dispute. Bonnar responds angrily, escalating the confrontation. Scotland was under lockdown due to the pandemic, with Bonnar stopping a few metres away from his neighbour, which seemed to stop any further conflict. Bonnar later argued he was decorating during the working week and the flag was to cover the window for a short period of time, claiming that he was "drawn into" the confrontation. The SNP offered an official apology on Bonnar's behalf:

I regret being drawn into a dispute with a neighbour and reacting hastily to comments made

In May 2020, Police Scotland made further inquiries into the incident between Bonnar and his neighbour. On 14 May, they were both charged in connection with a street disturbance. A statement from Police Scotland stated it would be submitted to the Procurator Fiscal.

=== Expenses ===
==== Highest expenses in 2021/22 ====
In October 2023, Bonnar faced criticism after it was revealed that the MP had the highest parliamentary expenses in 2021/22. Bonnar's expenses claims amounted to £72,510.15. Claims which faced particular scrutiny included Bonnar's numerous travel expenses and a £20 staff parking fee for Spa in the City – a central Glasgow spa and beauty salon. An SNP spokesperson later claimed that the parking fee was for staff members attending a CyberScotland Week security event in Glasgow.

==== Memorial wreath ====
In December 2023, Bonnar sparked controversy after charging the taxpayer £45 for a memorial wreath. The claim was reportedly made on 9 June 2023, and registered as an office cost for the purchase of equipment. An SNP spokesperson later said that the claim was made in error and that Bonnar would repay it 'at the earliest opportunity'.

=== COVID-19 lockdown breach ===
In January 2023, email communications leaked to the Sunday Mail showed that on 22 November 2020, Bonnar flew to Belfast, Northern Ireland, to attend a wedding reception. The journey contravened Scottish and Northern Irish restrictions, introduced in response to the COVID-19 pandemic, which banned non-essential travel. Bonnar had emailed SNP chief whip, Patrick Grady, writing: "Other than my office, my nearest and dearest and you in your role as chief whip, nobody else is aware of my trip." At the time, Scottish First Minister, Nicola Sturgeon, had said that there should be "no non-essential travel between Scotland and other parts of the UK, or Ireland." When faced with allegations of a lockdown breach, Bonnar defended his actions stating that "I think weddings were deemed 'essential travel'."

Parliament of the United Kingdom
Preceded by Hugh Gaffney	Member of Parliament for Coatbridge, Chryston and Bellshill; 2019–2024	Constituency abolished
