= Hugh Gaffney =

Scottish Labour politician (born 1963)

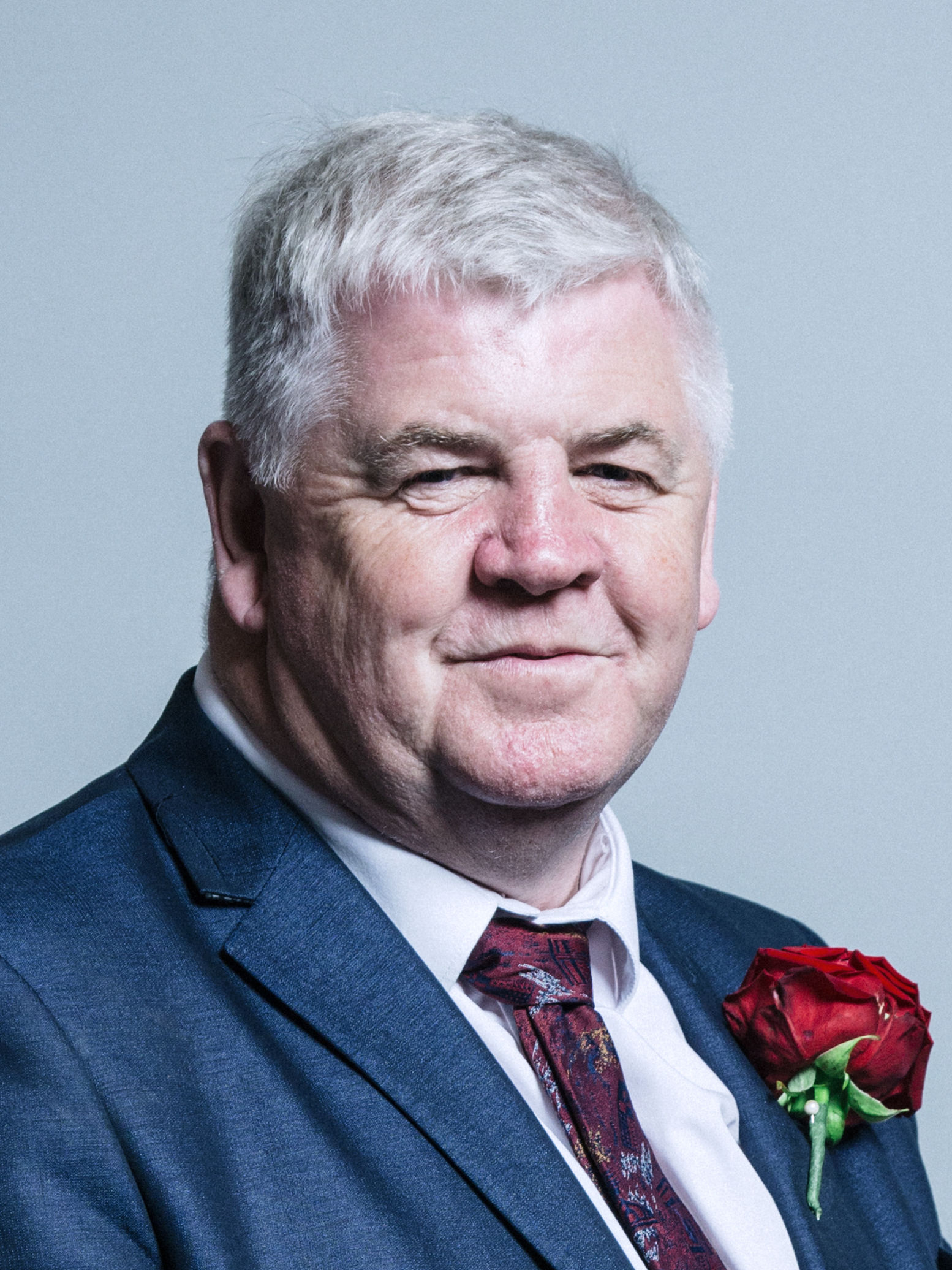
- Official portrait, 2017

Member of Parliament for Coatbridge, Chryston and Bellshill
- In office 8 June 2017 – 6 November 2019
- Preceded by: Phil Boswell
- Succeeded by: Steven Bonnar

Member of North Lanarkshire Council for Thorniewood
- In office 4 May 2017 – 1 July 2019
- Succeeded by: Norah Mooney

Personal details
- Born: Hugh Lawrence Gaffney; 10 August 1963 (age 62) Uddingston, South Lanarkshire, Scotland
- Party: Labour

Hugh Lawrence Gaffney (born 10 August 1963) is a Scottish Labour politician who served as the Member of Parliament (MP) for Coatbridge, Chryston and Bellshill from 2017 to 2019. He was a Member of North Lanarkshire Council from 2017 to 2019.

== Early life ==
Gaffney was raised in Uddingston, South Lanarkshire; he has three brothers and two sisters. He is married and has three sons. Since he was in his twenties, until being elected to Parliament, Gaffney worked for Royal Mail and Parcelforce, and attracted media attention when he wore his former postal work uniform to Westminster on his first day in the House of Commons. He also made historical reference to a speech made in 1894 by the founder of the Labour Party, Keir Hardie.

== Political career ==
Gaffney was elected to the North Lanarkshire Council in 2017, representing the Thorniewood ward. In the 2017 general election, he stood as the Labour candidate for Coatbridge, Chryston and Bellshill, defeating the incumbent Scottish National Party MP Phil Boswell.

In the 2017 Scottish Labour leadership election, Gaffney supported Richard Leonard to succeed Kezia Dugdale to be Scottish Labour leader over the alternative candidate Anas Sarwar; Gaffney's own Constituency Labour Party (CLP) took a firm stance on supporting Leonard's campaign.

In January 2018, Gaffney made jokes at a Labour Students Burns supper in which he used the phrases "bent" to describe gay people and "chinky" to describe Chinese food. He was not suspended from the Labour Party but instead given mandatory equality and diversity training. He later also apologised for the jokes.

Gaffney resigned as a councillor in North Lanarkshire Council in July 2019, triggering a council by-election. In his resignation letter to the council's chief executive, Gaffney said he had been privileged to serve the community into which he had been born and bred.

In the general election of December 2019, he was defeated by Steven Bonnar of the SNP.

== Personal life ==
In 2010 Gaffney was one of the founding members of the Keir Hardie Society, alongside Scottish author and longtime Labour member Bob Holman and former Scottish Labour leader Richard Leonard, with whom Gaffney has been friends since the 1990s. Gaffney supports Albion Rovers Football Club.

Parliament of the United Kingdom
Preceded by Phil Boswell	Member of Parliament for Coatbridge, Chryston and Bellshill; 2017–2019	Succeeded by Steven Bonnar
