= Braden Davy =

Scottish Conservative politician

- Davy in 2017

Member of the Angus Council for Forfar and District
- In office 4 May 2017 – 5 May 2022
- Preceded by: Glennis Middleton
- Succeeded by: Ross Greig

Personal details
- Born: Braden Davy; 1992 (age 33–34) Bishop Auckland, County Durham, UK
- Party: Scottish Conservatives (since 2016)
- Other political affiliations: Scottish Labour (until 2016)
- Education: University of Dundee

Braden Davy is a Scottish Conservative politician. He was elected to Angus Council in May 2017.

== Personal and work life ==
Davy was born in Bishop Auckland and was educated at Hirst High School, Ashington and Dundee University where he received a certificate in Economics. Davy became involved in youth politics whilst high at school. In 2011, Davy was part of a campaign encouraging residents of Northumbria to list their nationality as Northumbrian on their census returns.

Davy moved to Aberdeen in 2012, taking a management position with McDonald's before working as a Parliamentary Assistant to Dame Anne Begg, the Labour MP for Aberdeen South.

In 2015 Davy joined the Royal Naval Reserves and currently serves as a Sub-lieutenant, while studying for an M.Sc. in economics at the University of Edinburgh.

Davy was an assistant director of the Scottish Vote Leave campaign during the EU membership referendum.

In 2016 Davy quit Scottish Labour and joined the Scottish Conservatives citing Labour's "Patronising" attitude to Leave voters and "weak stance" on independence. Shortly after his defection from Labour, Davy started work as a Parliamentary Assistant to Ross Thomson, who at that time was an MSP for the North East Scotland Region, and went on to become his Office Manager. Later that year, Thomson was forced to repay an expenses claim for a hotel room which he and Davy had shared in Edinburgh.

He is a member of the Electoral Reform Society.

In 2021, Davy was embroiled in a controversy when a number of newspapers unmasked him as an online anti-SNP troll. He was accused of using anonymous accounts on Facebook to spread malicious content about political opponents. Davy was roundly criticised by anti-bullying campaigners and faced the prospect of a police probe into his conduct. He subsequently resigned from the ruling administration at Angus Council.

== Political career ==
Davy first stood as a Scottish Labour Party candidate in the 2012 Aberdeenshire Council election coming fourth in the First-preference votes in the Mid-Formartine ward. He stood again for Labour in the 2015 United Kingdom general election taking on Alex Salmond in the Gordon constituency, and again came fourth in the poll.

Standing as a Scottish Conservative candidate, Davy was elected to Angus Council in the 2017 Scottish local elections topping the First-preference votes in the Forfar & District ward.

Davy unsuccessful stood as the Scottish Conservative candidate for Angus North and Mearns in the 2021 Scottish Parliament election where he came second to the SNP.
