= Richard Thomson (politician) =

Scottish politician (born 1976)

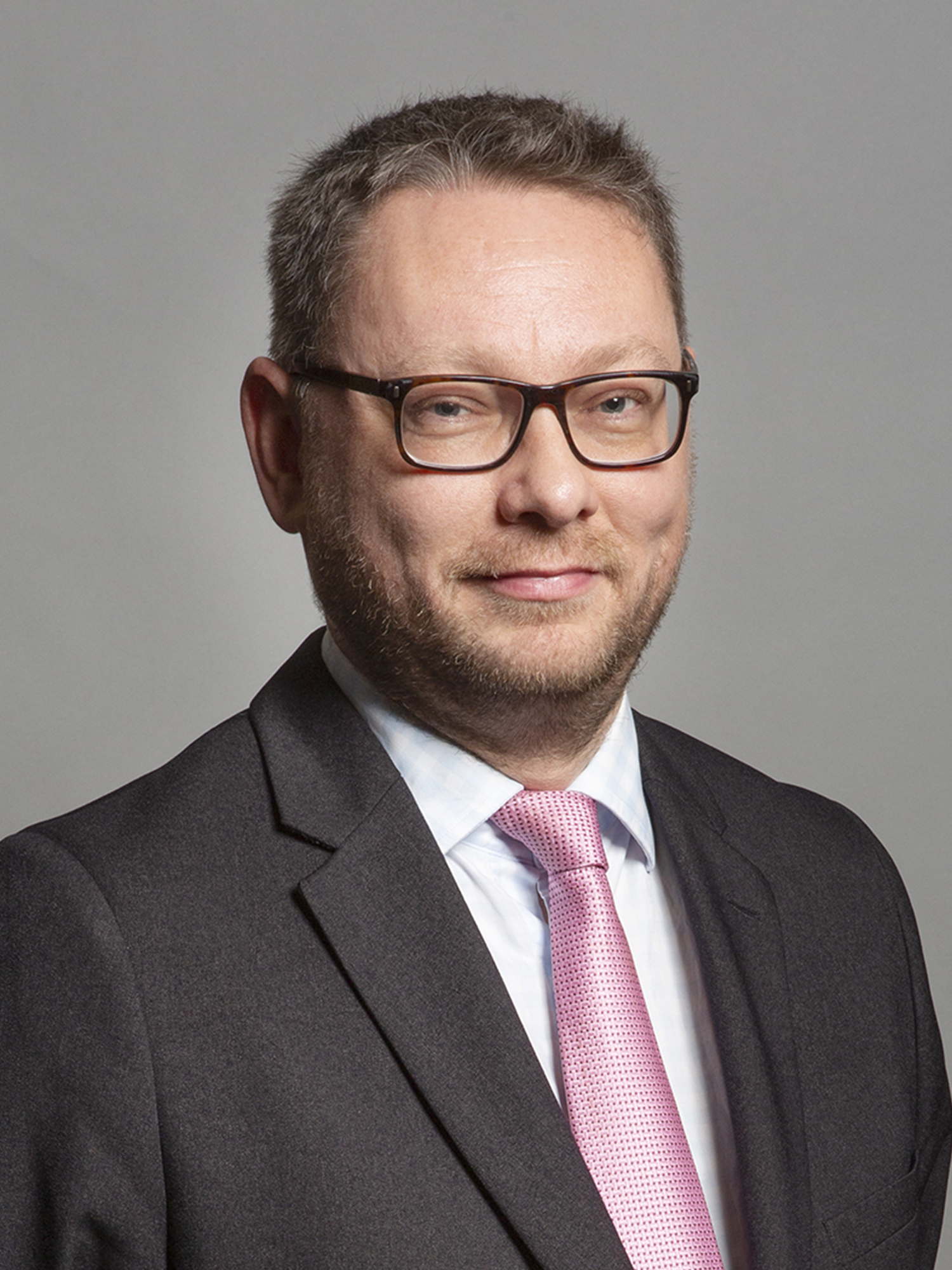
- Official portrait, 2019

SNP Spokesperson for Business and Trade in the House of Commons (Note: SNP Spokesperson for International Trade from 10 December 2022 to 4 September 2023)
- In office 10 December 2022 – 5 July 2024
- Leader: Stephen Flynn
- Preceded by: Drew Hendry
- Succeeded by: Role abolished

SNP Spokesperson for Northern Ireland and Wales in the House of Commons
- In office 1 February 2022 – 5 July 2024
- Leader: Ian Blackford; Stephen Flynn
- Preceded by: Kirsten Oswald
- Succeeded by: Role abolished

Member of Parliament for Gordon
- In office 12 December 2019 – 30 May 2024
- Preceded by: Colin Clark
- Succeeded by: Constituency abolished

Personal details
- Born: Richard Gordon Thomson; 16 June 1976 (age 50) Edinburgh, Scotland
- Party: Scottish National Party
- Education: University of Stirling; Edinburgh Business School

Richard Gordon Thomson (born 16 June 1976) is a Scottish politician. He is a member of the Scottish National Party (SNP) and was the Member of Parliament (MP) for Gordon from 2019 until the seat's abolition in 2024. He was also previously the leader of the SNP group on Aberdeenshire Council. He was the SNP Spokesperson for Business and Trade from 2022, and SNP Spokesperson for Wales and Northern Ireland until 2024.. He was the party's candidate in the 2026 Aberdeen South by-election but was defeated by the Conservatives' Douglas Lumsden.

== Early life and education ==
Thomson was born in Edinburgh in 1976, the son of Alexander and Ethel Thomson.

He was educated at Tynecastle High School, Edinburgh, before going to the University of Stirling to study History and Politics. He gained a BA (Hons) in 1998. He is presently studying part-time for an MBA from the Edinburgh Business School at Heriot-Watt University.

== Career ==
He worked for Scottish Widows in Edinburgh from 1999 to 2004, firstly as an Assistant Manager in their Customer Relations Department, and latterly as an Account Manager in Corporate Pensions.

He contributed a chapter exploring the 'social democratisation of the SNP' to a book on post-devolution politics called Breaking Up Britain – Four Nations After a Union, published in 2009 by Lawrence & Wishart.

Since 2017, he has been Deputy Editor of The Scots Independent newspaper.

== Political career ==
In 2001, he unsuccessfully contested the Tweeddale, Ettrick and Lauderdale constituency, a safe seat for the Liberal Democrats in which Thomson came fourth with 4,108 votes (12.4%). Thomson was former Head of Campaigns for the Scottish National Party from 2004 to 2005, and the party's Westminster Head of Research, before returning to Aberdeenshire in the summer of 2008 to work for First Minister Alex Salmond. Thomson was Parliamentary Assistant to Salmond from 2008 to 2011.

He worked as a senior researcher to MSP Shona Robison and MP Stewart Hosie from 2000 to 2007. In 2010, he stood in Gordon: the Liberal Democrat Malcolm Bruce retained his seat, but Thomson took the SNP into second place.

Thomson was on Aberdeenshire Council from 2012 to 2020. He was leader of Aberdeenshire Council from June 2015 until May 2017, and Opposition Leader from 2017 to 2020. He represented the council on the North Sea Commission, where he was vice-chair of the Marine Resources Group.

He was selected to contest the Gordon constituency for the second time at the 2019 general election. During the campaign he claimed, "A vote for me.. is not a vote for Scottish independence and I will never, ever, try and claim it as such." He narrowly won the seat from the Conservative incumbent Colin Clark, with a slim majority of 819 votes (1.4%).

In March 2020, Thomson resigned from Aberdeenshire Council to "concentrate 100% on being the MP for the Gordon Constituency".

In 2023, when questioned about Inverurie's largest medical practice not renewing its NHS contract due to recruitment issues, Thomson said he "would do everything" he could "to attract doctors to the constituency".

In the 2024 general election, he contested Gordon and Buchan but was defeated by the Conservative Harriet Cross.

== Post-parliamentary career ==
Following his defeat at the 2024 UK General Election, was appointed as an Associate Director at public affairs consultancy Invicta Public Affairs Ltd.

Thomson unsuccessfully attempted to stand as an SNP candidate in the 2026 Scottish Parliamentary elections, seeking the nomination for Angus North and Mearns. He was not selected, instead Dawn Black was nominated and she went on to win the constituency in the election.

In May 2026, he was selected as the SNP candidate in the 2026 Aberdeen South by-election, triggered by the resignation of Stephen Flynn upon his election to the Scottish Parliament. He lost the by-election to the Scottish Conservatives' Douglas Lumsden.

== Personal life ==
Thomson lives in Ellon, Aberdeenshire. His partner is Eilidh Mackechnie; the couple have two daughters.

== Notes ==
Parliament of the United Kingdom
Preceded by Colin Clark	Member of Parliament for Gordon; 2019–2024	Constituency abolished Equivalent seat Gordon and Buchan won by Harriet Cross
