= Colin Clark (politician) =

Scottish politician (born 1969)

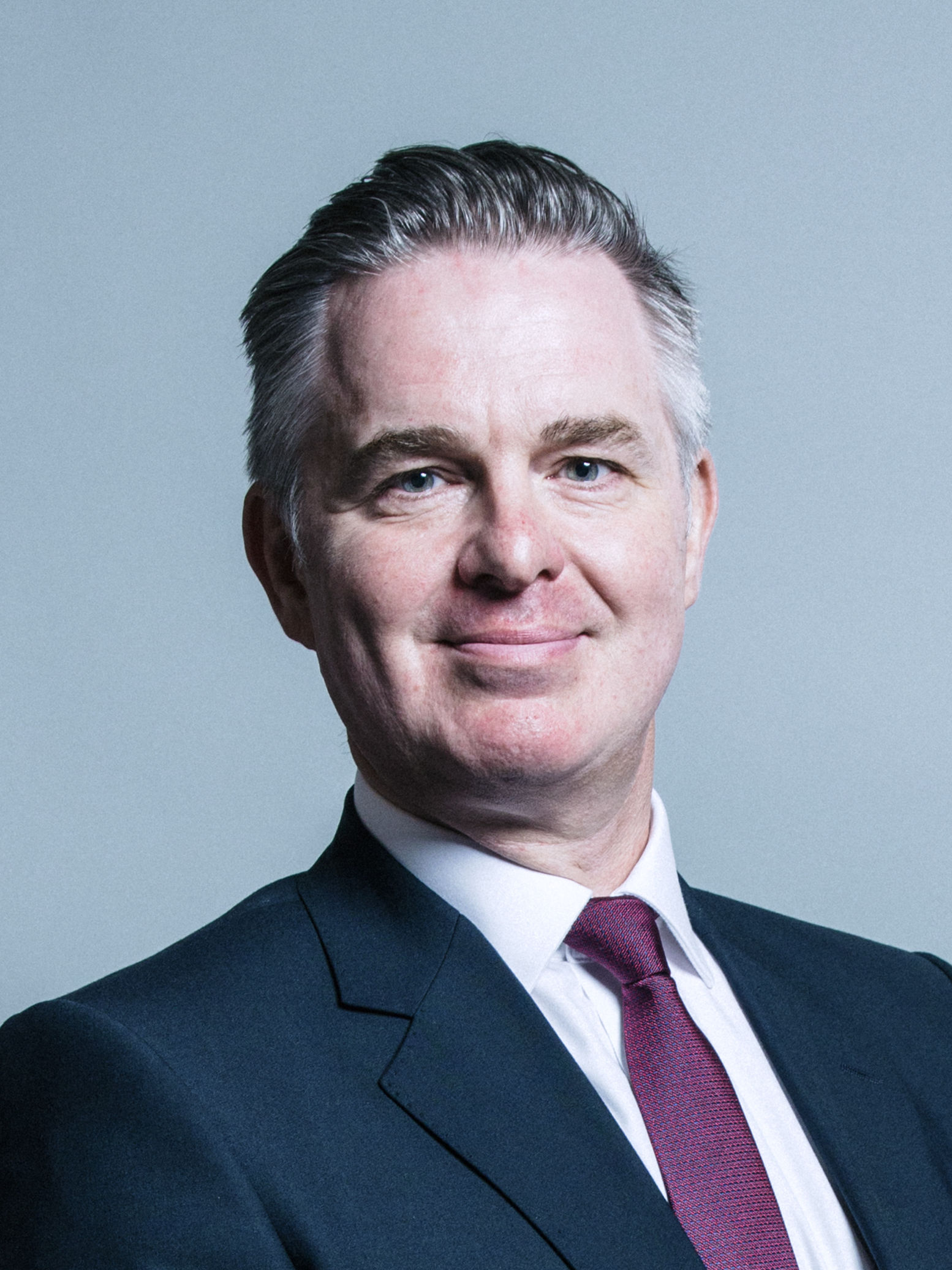
- Official portrait, 2017

Parliamentary Under-Secretary of State for Scotland
- In office 27 July 2019 – 16 December 2019
- Prime Minister: Boris Johnson
- Preceded by: Ian Duncan
- Succeeded by: Douglas Ross

Lord Commissioner of the Treasury
- In office 27 July 2019 – 16 December 2019
- Prime Minister: Boris Johnson
- Preceded by: George Hollingbery
- Succeeded by: Douglas Ross

Member of Parliament for Gordon
- In office 8 June 2017 – 6 November 2019
- Preceded by: Alex Salmond
- Succeeded by: Richard Thomson

Personal details
- Born: Colin James Clark; 20 May 1969 (age 57) Aberdeen, Scotland
- Party: Reform UK (2026–present) Conservative (until 2026)
- Spouse: Philippa Jones (m. 2005)
- Children: 2 - names: Joshua Ramsay Clark (2015), Theo Robert Clark (2012)
- Education: Heriot-Watt University

Colin James Clark (born 20 May 1969) is a Scottish politician who served as the Member of Parliament (MP) for Gordon from 2017 to 2019. Formerly a member of the Scottish Conservatives, Clark defected to Reform UK in April 2026.

== Early life ==
Clark was educated at Turriff Academy, a comprehensive school and Heriot-Watt University. He worked in business and agriculture until his election to the House of Commons.

== Political career ==
During the 2015 UK general election campaign, Clark's Scottish National Party opponent in Gordon, Alex Salmond, recorded in his diary: "The Tory candidate, Colin Clark, cuts an impressive figure but his politics are far too dry for this area. If the constituency were composed entirely of michty fairmers then he might be the ideal candidate. But it isn't and he is not."

Clark then contested the East Aberdeenshire constituency at the 2016 Holyrood elections, and finished second to Gillian Martin of the SNP with a 29% share of the vote. Clark was elected to Aberdeenshire Council at a 2016 by-election and re-elected in May 2017, shortly before the 2017 snap general election, at which he was elected as the MP for Gordon with a majority of 2,607 votes over former First Minister of Scotland, Alex Salmond.

In January 2019, Clark was appointed Parliamentary Private Secretary to the Department for Work and Pensions. He also sat on the Treasury Select Committee. On 27 July 2019, Clark was appointed Parliamentary Under-Secretary of State for Scotland and a Lord Commissioner of the Treasury in the first Johnson ministry.

Clark was unseated at the 2019 United Kingdom general election by the SNP candidate Richard Thomson, who won with a narrow majority of 819 votes.

== Later career ==
Clark was blocked by Ruth Davidson from standing at the 2021 Scottish Parliament election.

Parliament of the United Kingdom
| Preceded by Alex Salmond | Member of Parliament for Gordon; 2017–2019 | Succeeded by Richard Thomson |
