= Gordon (UK Parliament constituency) =

UK Parliament constituency (1983–2024)

Coordinates: 56.969°N 3.178°W

- Former county constituency for the House of Commons
- Boundary of Gordon in Scotland
- Subdivision: Aberdeenshire and Aberdeen City
- Major settlements: Dyce, Huntly, Ellon, Inverurie

1983–2024
- Created from: East Aberdeenshire and West Aberdeenshire
- Replaced by: Gordon and Buchan

Gordon was a county constituency of the House of Commons of the Parliament of the United Kingdom (Westminster), which elected one member of Parliament (MP) by the first past the post system of election. The constituency was first contested at the 1983 UK general election; and underwent boundary changes throughout its existence.

The constituency was represented by Colin Clark of the Scottish Conservatives, who gained the seat from former Scottish First Minister and former Scottish National Party leader Alex Salmond at the 2017 snap election- which overall saw the best Conservative Party result in Scotland for 34 years; with 13 MPs returned. The SNP regained the seat in the 2019 general election with Richard Thomson serving as MP.

As part of the 2023 Periodic Review of Westminster constituencies, the seat was subject to boundary changes, losing the parts in the Aberdeen City council area, partly offset by the addition of part of the abolished constituency of Banff and Buchan. As a consequence, it was renamed Gordon and Buchan, which was first contested at the 2024 general election.

== Boundaries ==
Map of boundaries 2005-2024

1983–1997: Gordon District, and the City of Aberdeen District electoral divisions of East Don and West Don.

1997–2005: The Gordon District electoral divisions of East Gordon, Formartine, Garioch, Inverurie, Kintore and Newmachar, and West Gordon, the Banff and Buchan District electoral division of Lower Deveron and Upper Ythan, and the Moray District electoral division of Keith-Strathisla.

2005–2024: The Aberdeenshire Council wards of Tarves, Ythan, Ellon Town, Logie Buchan, Meldrum, Udny-Slains, Belhelvie, Insch, Chapel and Gadie, Inverurie North, Inverurie Central, Inverurie South and Port Elphinstone, Kintore and Keithhall, Newmachar and Fintray, Huntly West, Huntly East, and Strathbogie, and the Aberdeen City Council wards of Pitmedden, Bankhead/Stoneywood, Danestone, Jesmond, Oldmachar, and Bridge of Don.

New boundaries were used for the 2005 general election. Prior to that election the constituency covered a central portion of the Aberdeenshire council area and a small eastern portion of the Moray council area. As a result of the 2005 boundary changes, in accordance with the Fifth Periodical Report of the Boundary Commission for Scotland, the Gordon constituency was one of five covering the Aberdeenshire council area and the Aberdeen City council area.

The Gordon constituency covered a central portion of the Aberdeenshire area and a northern portion of the Aberdeen City council area. Entirely within the Aberdeenshire council area, there is also Banff and Buchan, to the north of Gordon, and West Aberdeenshire and Kincardine, to the south. Entirely within the Aberdeen City council area, there is also Aberdeen North, to the south of Gordon, and Aberdeen South, further south.

The towns of Ellon, Huntly and Inverurie remain within the constituency.

Keith (within the Moray council area) was transferred to the Moray constituency, Turriff was transferred to the Banff and Buchan constituency, and Kemnay and Westhill were transferred to the West Aberdeenshire and Kincardine constituency.

The Bridge of Don and Dyce areas (within the Aberdeen City council area) were transferred to the Gordon constituency from the Aberdeen North constituency.

== Constituency profile and voting patterns ==
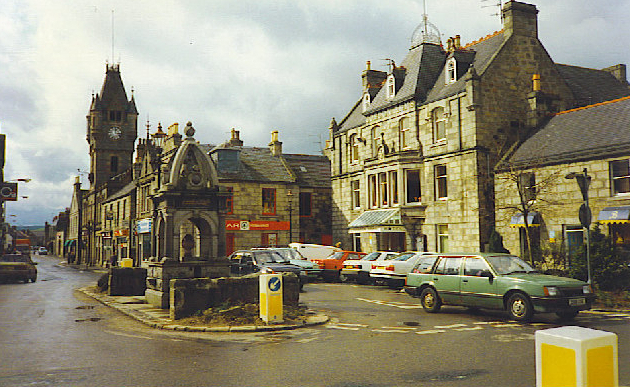
Gordon Square, Huntly.

=== Constituency profile ===
An affluent, semi-rural constituency spanning across central Aberdeenshire and northern Aberdeen, the Gordon constituency was among the least-deprived and highest-earning seats in Scotland, with a high proportion of skilled and professional workers.

The constituency covered the A90 and A96 corridors in Aberdeenshire north of Aberdeen, covering the towns of Huntly, Inverurie and Kintore situated along the Valleys of the River Don in the region of Garioch, and the towns of Ellon and Oldmeldrum in Formartine. The boundaries of the constituency stretched south into Aberdeen to the south-east, to cover the city's northern suburbs of Bankhead, Bridge of Don, Danestone and Dyce.

Oil, agriculture and tourism formed an important part of the local economy, with most of the constituency's settlements around Aberdeen serving as commuter territory for the city, including the towns of Inverurie and Kintore and the villages of Balmedie and Newmachar, where there is rapid population growth, with many areas seeing their population double within the last decade. Various energy companies have representations in Dyce and Bridge of Don, among which are EMS Oil and GE Oil and Gas. The constituency also covered Aberdeen International Airport in Dyce, Scotland's third-busiest airport by passenger numbers. Huntly, approximately 40 miles north-west of Aberdeen, is the historic home of the Gordon Highlanders regiment and is the site of Huntly Castle, the ancestral home of the chief of Clan Gordon. Huntly is also the headquarters of Dean's bakers, who produce shortbread. Ellon, approximately 16 miles north of Aberdeen, is a coastal resort sitting on the mouth of the River Ythan. On the outskirts of the town is a brewery owned by BrewDog.

=== Voting patterns ===
In the UK Parliament, Gordon was traditionally a Liberal-Conservative marginal. The constituency's predecessor seats of East Aberdeenshire and West Aberdeenshire were previously represented by the Conservatives. When Gordon was first formed in 1983, it was narrowly won by Malcolm Bruce of the Liberals, with a slender majority of 850 votes. Bruce subsequently increased his majority tenfold in 1987, before seeing it cut to just 274 in 1992, in new boundaries which benefited the Conservative Party. Since the Conservatives' landslide defeat in 1997, Gordon had returned Bruce of the Liberal Democrats with an increasing strong majority until Richard Thomson of the Scottish National Party cut his majority down by nearly 4,000 votes in 2010. In the nationwide SNP landslide victory in 2015, Salmond, former First Minister of Scotland and SNP Leader, gained the seat for the SNP with a majority of 8,687 votes ahead of the Liberal Democrats; with Bruce standing down. Salmond previously represented the coterminous Gordon constituency in the Scottish Parliament from 2007 until his retirement from the Scottish Parliament in 2016.

In the Scottish Parliament, Gordon was first represented by Nora Radcliffe of the Liberal Democrats in 1999. The constituency was a three-way marginal between the Conservatives, Liberal Democrats and SNP. Alex Salmond gained the constituency in 2007 with a 2,000 majority, increasing it to over 15,000 votes in 2011. More recently the Conservatives have made a strong comeback in Gordon, gaining the overlapping Aberdeenshire West constituency in 2016, and coming second behind the SNP in the overlapping constituencies of Aberdeen Donside and Aberdeenshire East.

At the 2016 European Union membership referendum, the Gordon constituency is estimated to have voted to Remain within the European Union on a margin of 55.5% Remain 44.5% Leave, an above-average Leave vote relative to the rest of Scotland.

The Scottish Conservatives took the most votes in the area at the 2017 local council elections, prompting party leader Ruth Davidson to say on a visit to Inverurie that "We won the local government election in Gordon this week, beating the SNP into second place. It means that in this seat, as in many others, it is a two-horse race between us and the [Scottish] Nationalists." In response to Davidson's comments, the SNP MP for Gordon at the time, Alex Salmond said: “It’s just arrogance, for Ruth Davidson to continue the line of ‘we’re going to take this seat, and we’re going to take that seat’. Once it doesn't happen, it's very bad news for Ruth Davidson's credibility.”

Salmond was later unseated by Conservative Colin Clark at the 2017 snap election on 8 June. The swing to the Conservatives was 20.4%, the party's largest swing in the whole of Britain. The defeat of Salmond was a bitter blow to SNP activists in the North East who characterised it to The Guardian as, “So disrespectful”, “How could local people do that to him?”

However, in the 2019 election, Richard Thomson narrowly regained the seat for the SNP with a majority of 819 (1.4%), meaning the seat remained an SNP-Conservative marginal.

== Members of Parliament ==
Election	Member	Party
1983	Sir Malcolm Bruce	Liberal
1988	Sir Malcolm Bruce	Liberal Democrat
2015	Alex Salmond	SNP
2017	Colin Clark	Conservative
2019	Richard Thomson	SNP

== Election results ==
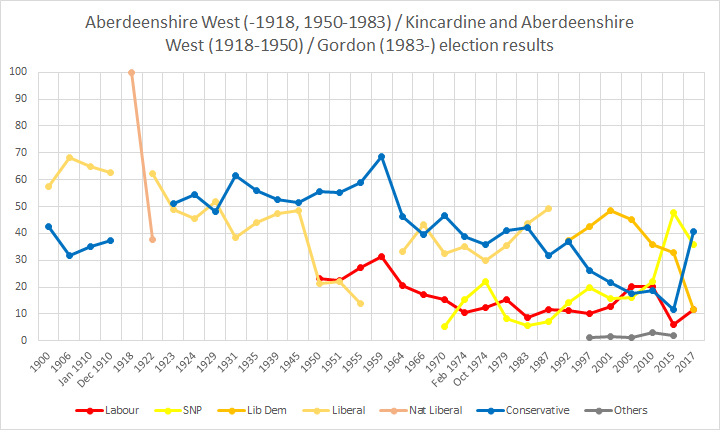
Gordon election results

=== Elections in the 2010s ===
General election 2019: Gordon
Party	Candidate	Votes	%	±%
SNP	Richard Thomson	23,885	42.7	+6.8
Conservative	Colin Clark	23,066	41.3	+0.6
Liberal Democrats	James Oates	5,913	10.6	−1.0
Labour	Heather Herbert	3,052	5.5	−6.3
Majority		819	1.4	N/A
Turnout		55,916	70.2	+1.8
SNP gain from Conservative		Swing	+3.2	

General election 2017: Gordon
Party	Candidate	Votes	%	±%
Conservative	Colin Clark	21,861	40.7	+29.0
SNP	Alex Salmond	19,254	35.9	−11.8
Labour	Kirsten Muat	6,340	11.8	+5.9
Liberal Democrats	David Evans	6,230	11.6	−21.1
Majority		2,607	4.8	N/A
Turnout		53,740	68.4	−4.9
Conservative gain from SNP		Swing	+20.4	

This was the largest swing towards the Conservatives within the United Kingdom at the 2017 general election.

General election 2015: Gordon
Party	Candidate	Votes	%	±%
SNP	Alex Salmond	27,717	47.7	+25.5
Liberal Democrats	Christine Jardine	19,030	32.7	−3.3
Conservative	Colin Clark	6,807	11.7	−7.0
Labour	Braden Davy	3,441	5.9	−14.2
UKIP	Emily Santos	1,166	2.0	New
Majority		8,687	15.0	N/A
Turnout		58,161	73.3	+6.9
SNP gain from Liberal Democrats		Swing	+14.4	

General election 2010: Gordon
Party	Candidate	Votes	%	±%
Liberal Democrats	Malcolm Bruce	17,575	36.0	−9.0
SNP	Richard Thomson	10,827	22.2	+6.2
Labour	Barney Crockett	9,811	20.1	−0.1
Conservative	Ross Thomson	9,111	18.7	+1.1
Green	Sue Edwards	752	1.5	New
BNP	Elise Jones	699	1.4	New
Majority		6,748	13.8	−9.0
Turnout		48,755	66.4	+4.6
Liberal Democrats hold		Swing	−7.6	

=== Elections of the 2000s ===
General election 2005: Gordon
Party	Candidate	Votes	%	±%
Liberal Democrats	Malcolm Bruce	20,008	45.0	+6.2
Labour	Iain Brotchie	8,982	20.2	−1.3
Conservative	Philip Atkinson	7,842	17.6	−1.4
SNP	Joanna Strathdee	7,098	16.0	−3.3
Scottish Socialist	Tommy Paterson	508	1.1	−0.4
Majority		11,026	24.8	+19.9
Turnout		44,438	61.8	+5.2
Liberal Democrats hold		Swing	+3.8	

Before the 2005 general election, Scotland went through major boundary changes.

General election 2001: Gordon
Party	Candidate	Votes	%	±%
Liberal Democrats	Malcolm Bruce	15,928	45.5	+2.9
Conservative	Nanette Milne	8,049	23.0	−3.0
SNP	Rhona Kemp	5,760	16.5	−3.5
Labour	Ellis Thorpe	4,730	13.5	+2.2
Scottish Socialist	John Sangster	534	1.5	New
Majority		7,879	22.5	+5.9
Turnout		35,001	58.3	−13.6
Liberal Democrats hold		Swing		

=== Elections of the 1990s ===
General election 1997: Gordon
Party	Candidate	Votes	%	±%
Liberal Democrats	Malcolm Bruce	17,999	42.6	+15.4
Conservative	John Porter	11,002	26.0	−22.0
SNP	Richard Lochhead	8,435	20.0	+1.4
Labour	Lindsey Kirkhill	4,350	10.3	+4.0
Referendum	Fred Pidcock	459	1.1	New
Majority		6,997	16.6	N/A
Turnout		42,245	71.9	−2.4
Liberal Democrats gain from Conservative		Swing		

Notional general election of 1992
Party	Candidate	Votes	%	±%
Conservative		19,596	48.0	
Liberal Democrats		11,110	27.2	
SNP		7,593	18.6	
Labour		2,561	6.3	
Majority		8,486	20.8	

General election 1992: Gordon
Party	Candidate	Votes	%	±%
Liberal Democrats	Malcolm Bruce	22,158	37.4	−12.0
Conservative	John Porter	21,884	37.0	+5.1
SNP	Brian Adam	8,445	14.3	+7.1
Labour	Peter Morrell	6,682	11.3	−0.2
Majority		274	0.4	−17.1
Turnout		59,169	74.3	+0.6
Liberal Democrats hold		Swing		

=== Elections of the 1980s ===
General election 1987: Gordon
Party	Candidate	Votes	%	±%
Liberal	Malcolm Bruce	26,770	49.4	+5.6
Conservative	Peter Leckie	17,251	31.9	−10.1
Labour	Morag Morrell	6,228	11.5	+3.0
SNP	George Wright	3,876	7.2	+1.5
Majority		9,519	17.5	+15.7
Turnout		54,125	73.7	+3.6
Liberal hold		Swing		

General election 1983: Gordon
Party	Candidate	Votes	%	±%
Liberal	Malcolm Bruce	20,134	43.8	+13.1
Conservative	James Cran	19,284	42.0	+0.2
Labour	George Grant	3,899	8.5	−5.7
SNP	Kenneth Guild	2,636	5.7	−7.6
Majority		850	1.8	N/A
Turnout		45,953	70.1	
Liberal win (new seat)				
